= 2023 Tour de Wallonie =

2023 UCI ProSeries
- Event poster with former winners

Race details
- Dates: 22–26 July 2023
- Stages: 5
- Distance: 803.8 km (499.5 mi)
- Winning time: 19h 08' 14"

Results
Jersey awarded to the overall winner	Winner	Filippo Ganna (ITA)	(INEOS Grenadiers)
	Second	Joshua Tarling (GBR)	(INEOS Grenadiers)
	Third	Brent Van Moer (BEL)	(Lotto–Dstny)
Jersey awarded to the points classification winner	Points	Timo Kielich (BEL)	(Alpecin–Deceuninck)
Jersey awarded to the mountains classification winner	Mountains	Johan Meens (BEL)	(Bingoal WB)
Jersey awarded to the young rider classification winner	Young rider	Joshua Tarling (GBR)	(INEOS Grenadiers)
Jersey awarded to the sprints classification winner	Sprints	Brent Van Moer (BEL)	(Lotto–Dstny)
	Team	(United Kingdom) INEOS Grenadiers	

The 2023 Tour de Wallonie (known as the Ethias–Tour de Wallonie for sponsorship reasons) was a five-stage men's professional road cycling race mainly held in the Belgian region of Wallonia. It was a 2.Pro race as part of the 2023 UCI ProSeries calendar. It was the 50th edition of the Tour de Wallonie.

== Teams ==
Nine UCI WorldTeams, five UCI ProTeams, and three UCI Continental teams made up the seventeen teams that participated in the race.

UCI WorldTeams

- AG2R Citroën Team
- Alpecin–Deceuninck
- Arkéa–Samsic
- Cofidis
- Groupama–FDJ
- INEOS Grenadiers
- Intermarché–Circus–Wanty
- Lidl–Trek
- Soudal–Quick-Step

UCI ProTeams

- Bingoal WB
- Israel–Premier Tech
- Lotto–Dstny
- Team Flanders–Baloise
- Uno-X Pro Cycling Team

UCI Continental Teams

- Baloise–Trek Lions
- Matériel-vélo.com
- Nice Métropole Côte d'Azur

== Route ==
Stage characteristics and winners
Stage	Date	Route	Distance	Type	Winner
1	22 July	Huy to Hamoir	189.6 km (117.8 mi)	Hilly stage	Filippo Ganna (ITA)
2	23 July	Saint-Ghislain to Walcourt	179.7 km (111.7 mi)	Hilly stage	Arnaud De Lie (BEL)
3	24 July	Thuin to Mont-Saint-Guibert	186.8 km (116.1 mi)	Hilly stage	Timo Kielich (BEL)
4	25 July	Mons to Mons	32.7 km (20.3 mi)	Individual time trial	Filippo Ganna (ITA)
5	26 July	Banneux to Aubel	215 km (134 mi)	Hilly stage	Andrea Bagioli (ITA)
Total			803.8 km (499.5 mi)		

== Stages ==
=== Stage 1 ===
22 July 2023 — Huy to Hamoir, 189.6 km (117.8 mi)

Stage 1 Result
Rank	Rider	Team	Time
1	Filippo Ganna (ITA)	INEOS Grenadiers	4h 39' 47"
2	Davide Ballerini (ITA)	Soudal–Quick-Step	+ 0"
3	Arne Marit (BEL)	Intermarché–Circus–Wanty	+ 0"
4	Elia Viviani (ITA)	INEOS Grenadiers	+ 0"
5	Robert Stannard (AUS)	Alpecin–Deceuninck	+ 0"
6	Edward Theuns (BEL)	Lidl–Trek	+ 0"
7	Timo Kielich (BEL)	Alpecin–Deceuninck	+ 0"
8	Tom Van Asbroeck (BEL)	Israel–Premier Tech	+ 0"
9	Clément Venturini (FRA)	AG2R Citroën Team	+ 0"
10	Giacomo Nizzolo (ITA)	Israel–Premier Tech	+ 0"

General classification after Stage 1
Rank	Rider	Team	Time
1	Filippo Ganna (ITA)	INEOS Grenadiers	4h 39' 37"
2	Davide Ballerini (ITA)	Soudal–Quick-Step	+ 4"
3	Arne Marit (BEL)	Intermarché–Circus–Wanty	+ 6"
4	Loïc Vliegen (BEL)	Intermarché–Circus–Wanty	+ 7"
5	Mathias Vacek (CZE)	Lidl–Trek	+ 8"
6	Ewen Costiou (FRA)	Arkéa–Samsic	+ 9"
7	Elia Viviani (ITA)	INEOS Grenadiers	+ 10"
8	Robert Stannard (AUS)	Alpecin–Deceuninck	+ 10"
9	Edward Theuns (BEL)	Lidl–Trek	+ 10"
10	Timo Kielich (BEL)	Alpecin–Deceuninck	+ 10"

=== Stage 2 ===
23 July 2023 — Saint-Ghislain to Walcourt, 179.7 km (111.7 mi)

Stage 2 Result
Rank	Rider	Team	Time
1	Arnaud De Lie (BEL)	Lotto–Dstny	4h 15' 29"
2	Thibau Nys (BEL)	Lidl–Trek	+ 0"
3	Timo Kielich (BEL)	Alpecin–Deceuninck	+ 0"
4	Elia Viviani (ITA)	INEOS Grenadiers	+ 0"
5	Davide Ballerini (ITA)	Soudal–Quick-Step	+ 0"
6	Stefano Oldani (ITA)	Alpecin–Deceuninck	+ 0"
7	Robert Stannard (AUS)	Alpecin–Deceuninck	+ 0"
8	Edward Theuns (BEL)	Lidl–Trek	+ 0"
9	Kenneth Van Rooy (BEL)	Bingoal WB	+ 0"
10	Marco Tizza (ITA)	Bingoal WB	+ 0"

General classification after Stage 2
Rank	Rider	Team	Time
1	Arnaud De Lie (BEL)	Lotto–Dstny	8h 55' 06"
2	Filippo Ganna (ITA)	INEOS Grenadiers	+ 0"
3	Davide Ballerini (ITA)	Soudal–Quick-Step	+ 4"
4	Thibau Nys (BEL)	Lidl–Trek	+ 4"
5	Sander De Pestel (BEL)	Team Flanders–Baloise	+ 4"
6	Mathias Vacek (CZE)	Lidl–Trek	+ 5"
7	Timo Kielich (BEL)	Alpecin–Deceuninck	+ 6"
8	Arne Marit (BEL)	Intermarché–Circus–Wanty	+ 6"
9	Loïc Vliegen (BEL)	Intermarché–Circus–Wanty	+ 7"
10	Laurenz Rex (BEL)	Intermarché–Circus–Wanty	+ 7"

=== Stage 3 ===
24 July 2023 — Thuin to Mont-Saint-Guibert, 186.8 km (116.1 mi)

Stage 3 Result
Rank	Rider	Team	Time
1	Timo Kielich (BEL)	Alpecin–Deceuninck	4h 28' 57"
2	Florian Sénéchal (FRA)	Soudal–Quick-Step	+ 0"
3	Simone Consonni (ITA)	Cofidis	+ 0"
4	Arnaud De Lie (BEL)	Lotto–Dstny	+ 0"
5	Jake Stewart (GBR)	Groupama–FDJ	+ 0"
6	Paul Lapeira (FRA)	AG2R Citroën Team	+ 0"
7	Marco Tizza (ITA)	Bingoal WB	+ 0"
8	Stan Van Tricht (BEL)	Soudal–Quick-Step	+ 0"
9	Lorenzo Rota (ITA)	Intermarché–Circus–Wanty	+ 0"
10	Filippo Baroncini (ITA)	Lidl–Trek	+ 0"

General classification after Stage 3
Rank	Rider	Team	Time
1	Timo Kielich (BEL)	Alpecin–Deceuninck	13h 23' 59"
2	Arnaud De Lie (BEL)	Lotto–Dstny	+ 4"
3	Filippo Ganna (ITA)	INEOS Grenadiers	+ 4"
4	Davide Ballerini (ITA)	Soudal–Quick-Step	+ 8"
5	Thibau Nys (BEL)	Lidl–Trek	+ 8"
6	Florian Sénéchal (FRA)	Soudal–Quick-Step	+ 8"
7	Sander De Pestel (BEL)	Team Flanders–Baloise	+ 8"
8	Simone Consonni (ITA)	Cofidis	+ 10"
9	Arne Marit (BEL)	Intermarché–Circus–Wanty	+ 10"
10	Brent Van Moer (BEL)	Lotto–Dstny	+ 11"

=== Stage 4 ===
25 July 2023 — Mons to Mons, 32.7 km (20.3 mi), (ITT)

Stage 4 Result
Rank	Rider	Team	Time
1	Filippo Ganna (ITA)	INEOS Grenadiers	38' 01"
2	Joshua Tarling (GBR)	INEOS Grenadiers	+ 8"
3	Connor Swift (GBR)	INEOS Grenadiers	+ 30"
4	Brent Van Moer (BEL)	Lotto–Dstny	+ 36"
5	Daan Hoole (NED)	Lidl–Trek	+ 50"
6	Bruno Armirail (FRA)	Groupama–FDJ	+ 1' 00"
7	Xandro Meurisse (BEL)	Alpecin–Deceuninck	+ 1' 24"
8	Jannik Steimle (GER)	Soudal–Quick-Step	+ 1' 29"
9	Thibault Guernalec (FRA)	Arkéa–Samsic	+ 1' 34"
10	Pierre-Luc Périchon (FRA)	Cofidis	+ 1' 36"

General classification after Stage 4
Rank	Rider	Team	Time
1	Filippo Ganna (ITA)	INEOS Grenadiers	14h 02' 04"
2	Joshua Tarling (GBR)	INEOS Grenadiers	+ 18"
3	Connor Swift (GBR)	INEOS Grenadiers	+ 40"
4	Brent Van Moer (BEL)	Lotto–Dstny	+ 43"
5	Xandro Meurisse (BEL)	Alpecin–Deceuninck	+ 1' 34"
6	Thibault Guernalec (FRA)	Arkéa–Samsic	+ 1' 44"
7	Pierre-Luc Périchon (FRA)	Cofidis	+ 1' 46"
8	Bauke Mollema (NED)	Lidl–Trek	+ 2' 01"
9	Filippo Baroncini (ITA)	Lidl–Trek	+ 2' 02"
10	Niklas Larsen (DEN)	Uno-X Pro Cycling Team	+ 2' 10"

=== Stage 5 ===
26 July 2023 — Banneux to Aubel, 215 km (134 mi)

Stage 5 Result
Rank	Rider	Team	Time
1	Andrea Bagioli (ITA)	Soudal–Quick-Step	5h 06' 11"
2	Stephen Williams (GBR)	Israel–Premier Tech	+ 0"
3	Arnaud De Lie (BEL)	Lotto–Dstny	+ 0"
4	Timo Kielich (BEL)	Alpecin–Deceuninck	+ 0"
5	Jake Stewart (GBR)	Groupama–FDJ	+ 0"
6	Mathis Le Berre (FRA)	Arkéa–Samsic	+ 0"
7	Thibau Nys (BEL)	Lidl–Trek	+ 0"
8	Clément Venturini (FRA)	AG2R Citroën Team	+ 0"
9	Kenneth Van Rooy (BEL)	Bingoal WB	+ 0"
10	Stefano Oldani (ITA)	Alpecin–Deceuninck	+ 0"

General classification after Stage 5
Rank	Rider	Team	Time
1	Filippo Ganna (ITA)	INEOS Grenadiers	19h 08' 14"
2	Joshua Tarling (GBR)	INEOS Grenadiers	+ 18"
3	Brent Van Moer (BEL)	Lotto–Dstny	+ 40"
4	Connor Swift (GBR)	INEOS Grenadiers	+ 40"
5	Xandro Meurisse (BEL)	Alpecin–Deceuninck	+ 1' 34"
6	Thibault Guernalec (FRA)	Arkéa–Samsic	+ 1' 44"
7	Pierre-Luc Périchon (FRA)	Cofidis	+ 1' 46"
8	Bauke Mollema (NED)	Lidl–Trek	+ 2' 01"
9	Filippo Baroncini (ITA)	Lidl–Trek	+ 2' 02"
10	Mauro Schmid (SUI)	Soudal–Quick-Step	+ 2' 08"

== Classification leadership table ==
Classification leadership by stage
Stage	Winner	General classification	Points classification	Mountains classification	Sprints classification	Young rider classification	Team classification	Combativity award
1	Filippo Ganna	Filippo Ganna	Filippo Ganna	Johan Meens	Alex Colman	Mathias Vacek	Alpecin–Deceuninck	Jonathan Couanon
2	Arnaud De Lie	Arnaud De Lie	Davide Ballerini	Johan Meens	Sander De Pestel	Arnaud De Lie	Alpecin–Deceuninck	Laurenz Rex
3	Timo Kielich	Timo Kielich	Timo Kielich	Johan Meens	Alex Colman	Timo Kielich	Alpecin–Deceuninck	Tord Gudmestad
4	Filippo Ganna	Filippo Ganna	Filippo Ganna	Johan Meens	Alex Colman	Joshua Tarling	INEOS Grenadiers	not awarded
5	Andrea Bagioli	Filippo Ganna	Timo Kielich	Johan Meens	Brent Van Moer	Joshua Tarling	INEOS Grenadiers	Mauro Schmid
Final		Filippo Ganna	Timo Kielich	Johan Meens	Brent Van Moer	Joshua Tarling	Ineos Grenadiers	not awarded

== Classification standings ==
Legend
Denotes the winner of the general classification	Denotes the winner of the sprints classification
Denotes the winner of the points classification	Denotes the winner of the young rider classification
Denotes the winner of the mountains classification	

=== General classification ===
Final general classification (1–10)
Rank	Rider	Team	Time
1	Filippo Ganna (ITA)	INEOS Grenadiers	19h 08' 14"
2	Joshua Tarling (GBR)	INEOS Grenadiers	+ 18"
3	Brent Van Moer (BEL)	Lotto–Dstny	+ 40"
4	Connor Swift (GBR)	INEOS Grenadiers	+ 40"
5	Xandro Meurisse (BEL)	Alpecin–Deceuninck	+ 1' 34"
6	Thibault Guernalec (FRA)	Arkéa–Samsic	+ 1' 44"
7	Pierre-Luc Périchon (FRA)	Cofidis	+ 1' 46"
8	Bauke Mollema (NED)	Lidl–Trek	+ 2' 01"
9	Filippo Baroncini (ITA)	Lidl–Trek	+ 2' 02"
10	Mauro Schmid (SUI)	Soudal–Quick-Step	+ 2' 08"

=== Points classification ===
Final points classification (1–10)
Rank	Rider	Team	Points
1	Timo Kielich (BEL)	Alpecin–Deceuninck	54
2	Filippo Ganna (ITA)	INEOS Grenadiers	50
3	Arnaud De Lie (BEL)	Lotto–Dstny	50
4	Andrea Bagioli (ITA)	Soudal–Quick-Step	25
5	Thibau Nys (BEL)	Lidl–Trek	24
6	Joshua Tarling (GBR)	INEOS Grenadiers	20
7	Florian Sénéchal (FRA)	Soudal–Quick-Step	20
8	Stephen Williams (GBR)	Israel–Premier Tech	20
9	Jake Stewart (GBR)	Groupama–FDJ	16
10	Connor Swift (GBR)	INEOS Grenadiers	15

=== Mountains classification ===
Final mountains classification (1–10)
Rank	Rider	Team	Points
1	Johan Meens (BEL)	Bingoal WB	64
2	Cériel Desal (BEL)	Bingoal WB	46
3	Mauro Schmid (SUI)	Soudal–Quick-Step	38
4	Mauri Vansevenant (BEL)	Soudal–Quick-Step	28
5	Dries De Bondt (BEL)	Alpecin–Deceuninck	28
6	Bruno Armirail (FRA)	Groupama–FDJ	16
7	Sander De Pestel (BEL)	Team Flanders–Baloise	10
8	Amanuel Ghebreigzabhier (ERI)	Lidl–Trek	6
9	Joris Nieuwenhuis (NED)	Baloise–Trek Lions	4
10	Pim Ronhaar (NED)	Baloise–Trek Lions	2

=== Sprints classification ===
Final sprints classification (1–10)
Rank	Rider	Team	Points
1	Brent Van Moer (BEL)	Lotto–Dstny	10
2	Mauro Schmid (SUI)	Soudal–Quick-Step	10
3	Sander De Pestel (BEL)	Team Flanders–Baloise	10
4	Dries De Bondt (BEL)	Alpecin–Deceuninck	6
5	Loïc Vliegen (BEL)	Intermarché–Circus–Wanty	5
6	Johan Meens (BEL)	Bingoal WB	4
7	Lorenzo Rota (ITA)	Intermarché–Circus–Wanty	3
8	Paul Lapeira (FRA)	AG2R Citroën Team	3
9	Robert Stannard (AUS)	Alpecin–Deceuninck	3
10	Kenneth Van Rooy (BEL)	Bingoal WB	3

=== Young rider classification ===
Final young rider classification (1–10)
Rank	Rider	Team	Time
1	Joshua Tarling (GBR)	INEOS Grenadiers	19h 08' 32"
2	Filippo Baroncini (ITA)	Lidl–Trek	+ 1' 44"
3	Mauro Schmid (SUI)	Soudal–Quick-Step	+ 1' 50"
4	Paul Lapeira (FRA)	AG2R Citroën Team	+ 2' 12"
5	Jenno Berckmoes (BEL)	Team Flanders–Baloise	+ 2' 38"
6	Timo Kielich (BEL)	Alpecin–Deceuninck	+ 2' 57"
7	Enzo Paleni (FRA)	Groupama–FDJ	+ 2' 57"
8	Arnaud De Lie (BEL)	Lotto–Dstny	+ 3' 02"
9	Jake Stewart (GBR)	Groupama–FDJ	+ 3' 26"
10	Mathis Le Berre (FRA)	Arkéa–Samsic	+ 3' 59"

=== Team classification ===
Final team classification (1–10)
Rank	Team	Time
1	(United Kingdom) INEOS Grenadiers	57h 25' 50"
2	(United States) Lidl–Trek	+ 3' 55"
3	(Belgium) Soudal–Quick-Step	+ 4' 44"
4	(Belgium) Alpecin–Deceuninck	+ 5' 59"
5	(Belgium) Lotto–Dstny	+ 6' 30"
6	(Belgium) Intermarché–Circus–Wanty	+ 6' 45"
7	(France) Groupama–FDJ	+ 7' 09"
8	(France) AG2R Citroën Team	+ 7' 32"
9	(France) Cofidis	+ 8' 16"
10	Israel–Premier Tech	+ 8' 41"
