= 2015 Giro =

2015 Giro can refer to:

- 2015 Giro d'Italia
- 2015 Giro d'Italia Femminile
- 2015 Giro del Trentino
- 2015 Il Lombardia
- 2015 Gran Piemonte
