= 2022 Tour of Oman =

Omani cycling race

2022 UCI ProSeries

Race details
- Dates: 10–15 February 2022
- Stages: 6
- Distance: 888 km (552 mi)
- Winning time: 22h 35' 43"

Results
| Jersey awarded to the overall winner | Winner | Jan Hirt (CZE) | (Intermarché–Wanty–Gobert Matériaux) |
| | Second | Fausto Masnada (ITA) | (Quick-Step Alpha Vinyl Team) |
| | Third | Rui Costa (POR) | (UAE Team Emirates) |
| Jersey awarded to the points classification winner | Points | Fernando Gaviria (COL) | (UAE Team Emirates) |
| Jersey awarded to the young rider classification winner | Young rider | Anthon Charmig (DEN) | (Uno-X Pro Cycling Team) |
| Jersey awarded to the sprints classification winner | Sprints | Peio Goikoetxea (ESP) | (Euskaltel–Euskadi) |
| | Team | Arkéa–Samsic | |

The 2022 Tour of Oman was a road cycling stage race that took place between 10 and 15 February 2022 in Oman. The race was rated as a category 2.Pro event on the 2022 UCI ProSeries calendar and was the 11th edition of the Tour of Oman.

The race returned after a two-year hiatus and made its inaugural appearance in the UCI ProSeries. The 2020 edition was cancelled due to a national mourning period following the death of Sultan Qaboos bin Said, while the 2021 edition was cancelled due to the COVID-19 pandemic.

== Teams ==
Seven of the 18 UCI WorldTeams, eight UCI ProTeams, one UCI Continental team, and the Omani national team made up the 18 teams that participated in the race. Only six teams entered a full squad of seven riders each; five teams entered six riders each, while the remaining six teams entered five riders each. With one non-starter each, Bingoal Pauwels Sauces WB was reduced to six riders, while Uno-X Pro Cycling Team was reduced to four. In total, 100 riders started the race, of which 86 finished.

UCI WorldTeams

- Cofidis
- Groupama–FDJ
- Intermarché–Wanty–Gobert Matériaux
- Quick-Step Alpha Vinyl Team
- Team BikeExchange–Jayco
- Team DSM
- UAE Team Emirates

UCI ProTeams

- Arkéa–Samsic
- Bardiani–CSF–Faizanè
- Bingoal Pauwels Sauces WB
- Burgos BH
- Euskaltel–Euskadi
- Gazprom–RusVelo
- Team Novo Nordisk
- Uno-X Pro Cycling Team

UCI Continental Teams

- Astana Qazaqstan Development Team

National Teams

- Oman

== Route ==
Stage characteristics and winners
| Stage | Date | Course | Distance | Type | Stage winner |
|---|---|---|---|---|---|
| 1 | 10 February | Al Rustaq Fort to Oman Convention and Exhibition Centre | 138 km (86 mi) | Flat stage | Fernando Gaviria (COL) |
| 2 | 11 February | Naseem Park to Suhar Corniche | 167.5 km (104.1 mi) | Flat stage | Mark Cavendish (GBR) |
| 3 | 12 February | Sultan Qaboos University to Qurayyat | 180 km (110 mi) | Hilly stage | Anthon Charmig (DEN) |
| 4 | 13 February | Al Sifah to Muscat Royal Opera | 119.5 km (74.3 mi) | Hilly stage | Fausto Masnada (ITA) |
| 5 | 14 February | Samail (Al Feyhaa Resthouse) to Jabal al Akhdhar (Green Mountain) | 150.5 km (93.5 mi) | Mountain stage | Jan Hirt (CZE) |
| 6 | 15 February | Al Mouj Muscat to Matrah Corniche | 132.5 km (82.3 mi) | Flat stage | Fernando Gaviria (COL) |
| Total | | | 888 km (552 mi) | | |

== Stages ==
=== Stage 1 ===
10 February 2022 — Al Rustaq Fort to Oman Convention and Exhibition Centre, 138 km (86 mi)

Stage 1 Result (1–10)
| Rank | Rider | Team | Time |
|---|---|---|---|
| 1 | Fernando Gaviria (COL) | UAE Team Emirates | 3h 17' 04" |
| 2 | Mark Cavendish (GBR) | Quick-Step Alpha Vinyl Team | + 0" |
| 3 | Kaden Groves (AUS) | Team BikeExchange–Jayco | + 0" |
| 4 | Amaury Capiot (BEL) | Arkéa–Samsic | + 0" |
| 5 | Paul Penhoët (FRA) | Groupama–FDJ | + 0" |
| 6 | Maximiliano Richeze (ARG) | UAE Team Emirates | + 0" |
| 7 | Max Walscheid (GER) | Cofidis | + 0" |
| 8 | Hugo Page (FRA) | Intermarché–Wanty–Gobert Matériaux | + 0" |
| 9 | Andrea Peron (ITA) | Team Novo Nordisk | + 0" |
| 10 | Mihkel Räim (EST) | Burgos BH | + 0" |

General classification after Stage 1 (1–10)
| Rank | Rider | Team | Time |
|---|---|---|---|
| 1 | Fernando Gaviria (COL) | UAE Team Emirates | 3h 16' 54" |
| 2 | Mark Cavendish (GBR) | Quick-Step Alpha Vinyl Team | + 2" |
| 3 | Peio Goikoetxea (ESP) | Euskaltel–Euskadi | + 4" |
| 4 | Kaden Groves (AUS) | Team BikeExchange–Jayco | + 6" |
| 5 | Rui Costa (POR) | UAE Team Emirates | + 9" |
| 6 | Jan Dunnewind (NED) | Team Novo Nordisk | + 9" |
| 7 | Amaury Capiot (BEL) | Arkéa–Samsic | + 10" |
| 8 | Paul Penhoët (FRA) | Groupama–FDJ | + 10" |
| 9 | Maximiliano Richeze (ARG) | UAE Team Emirates | + 10" |
| 10 | Max Walscheid (GER) | Cofidis | + 10" |

=== Stage 2 ===
11 February 2022 — Naseem Park to Suhar Corniche, 167.5 km (104.1 mi)

Stage 2 Result (1–10)
| Rank | Rider | Team | Time |
|---|---|---|---|
| 1 | Mark Cavendish (GBR) | Quick-Step Alpha Vinyl Team | 4h 10' 31" |
| 2 | Kaden Groves (AUS) | Team BikeExchange–Jayco | + 0" |
| 3 | Amaury Capiot (BEL) | Arkéa–Samsic | + 0" |
| 4 | Fernando Gaviria (COL) | UAE Team Emirates | + 0" |
| 5 | Tom Devriendt (BEL) | Intermarché–Wanty–Gobert Matériaux | + 0" |
| 6 | Mihkel Räim (EST) | Burgos BH | + 0" |
| 7 | Campbell Stewart (NZL) | Team BikeExchange–Jayco | + 0" |
| 8 | Paul Penhoët (FRA) | Groupama–FDJ | + 0" |
| 9 | Milan Menten (BEL) | Bingoal Pauwels Sauces WB | + 0" |
| 10 | Carlos Canal (ESP) | Euskaltel–Euskadi | + 0" |

General classification after Stage 2 (1–10)
| Rank | Rider | Team | Time |
|---|---|---|---|
| 1 | Mark Cavendish (GBR) | Quick-Step Alpha Vinyl Team | 7h 27' 16" |
| 2 | Kaden Groves (AUS) | Team BikeExchange–Jayco | + 9" |
| 3 | Fernando Gaviria (COL) | UAE Team Emirates | + 9" |
| 4 | Antonio Angulo (ESP) | Euskaltel–Euskadi | + 13" |
| 5 | Peio Goikoetxea (ESP) | Euskaltel–Euskadi | + 13" |
| 6 | Amaury Capiot (BEL) | Arkéa–Samsic | + 15" |
| 7 | Rui Costa (POR) | UAE Team Emirates | + 17" |
| 8 | Paul Penhoët (FRA) | Groupama–FDJ | + 19" |
| 9 | Mihkel Räim (EST) | Burgos BH | + 19" |
| 10 | Milan Menten (BEL) | Bingoal Pauwels Sauces WB | + 19" |

=== Stage 3 ===
12 February 2022 — Sultan Qaboos University to Qurayyat, 180 km (110 mi)

Stage 3 Result (1–10)
| Rank | Rider | Team | Time |
|---|---|---|---|
| 1 | Anthon Charmig (DEN) | Uno-X Pro Cycling Team | 4h 19' 30" |
| 2 | Jan Hirt (CZE) | Intermarché–Wanty–Gobert Matériaux | + 0" |
| 3 | Élie Gesbert (FRA) | Arkéa–Samsic | + 2" |
| 4 | Fausto Masnada (ITA) | Quick-Step Alpha Vinyl Team | + 4" |
| 5 | Rui Costa (POR) | UAE Team Emirates | + 4" |
| 6 | Rein Taaramäe (EST) | Intermarché–Wanty–Gobert Matériaux | + 4" |
| 7 | Henri Vandenabeele (BEL) | Team DSM | + 4" |
| 8 | Harold López (ECU) | Astana Qazaqstan Development Team | + 7" |
| 9 | Denis Nekrasov (RUS) | Gazprom–RusVelo | + 7" |
| 10 | Mauro Schmid (SUI) | Quick-Step Alpha Vinyl Team | + 7" |

General classification after Stage 3 (1–10)
| Rank | Rider | Team | Time |
|---|---|---|---|
| 1 | Anthon Charmig (DEN) | Uno-X Pro Cycling Team | 11h 46' 55" |
| 2 | Jan Hirt (CZE) | Intermarché–Wanty–Gobert Matériaux | + 4" |
| 3 | Élie Gesbert (FRA) | Arkéa–Samsic | + 8" |
| 4 | Rui Costa (POR) | UAE Team Emirates | + 12" |
| 5 | Rein Taaramäe (EST) | Intermarché–Wanty–Gobert Matériaux | + 14" |
| 6 | Denis Nekrasov (RUS) | Gazprom–RusVelo | + 17" |
| 7 | Harold López (ECU) | Astana Qazaqstan Development Team | + 17" |
| 8 | Hugo Page (FRA) | Intermarché–Wanty–Gobert Matériaux | + 17" |
| 9 | Ryan Gibbons (RSA) | UAE Team Emirates | + 17" |
| 10 | Filippo Zana (ITA) | Bardiani–CSF–Faizanè | + 17" |

=== Stage 4 ===
13 February 2022 — Al Sifah to Muscat Royal Opera, 119.5 km (74.3 mi)

Stage 4 Result (1–10)
| Rank | Rider | Team | Time |
|---|---|---|---|
| 1 | Fausto Masnada (ITA) | Quick-Step Alpha Vinyl Team | 3h 01' 53" |
| 2 | Mauro Schmid (SUI) | Quick-Step Alpha Vinyl Team | + 1' 07" |
| 3 | Kévin Vauquelin (FRA) | Arkéa–Samsic | + 1' 07" |
| 4 | Rui Costa (POR) | UAE Team Emirates | + 1' 07" |
| 5 | Kevin Vermaerke (USA) | Team DSM | + 1' 07" |
| 6 | Anthon Charmig (DEN) | Uno-X Pro Cycling Team | + 1' 07" |
| 7 | Jan Hirt (CZE) | Intermarché–Wanty–Gobert Matériaux | + 1' 07" |
| 8 | Henri Vandenabeele (BEL) | Team DSM | + 1' 07" |
| 9 | Sander Armée (BEL) | Cofidis | + 1' 18" |
| 10 | Jonas Iversby Hvideberg (NOR) | Team DSM | + 1' 23" |

General classification after Stage 4 (1–10)
| Rank | Rider | Team | Time |
|---|---|---|---|
| 1 | Fausto Masnada (ITA) | Quick-Step Alpha Vinyl Team | 14h 49' 00" |
| 2 | Anthon Charmig (DEN) | Uno-X Pro Cycling Team | + 55" |
| 3 | Jan Hirt (CZE) | Intermarché–Wanty–Gobert Matériaux | + 58" |
| 4 | Mauro Schmid (SUI) | Quick-Step Alpha Vinyl Team | + 1' 06" |
| 5 | Rui Costa (POR) | UAE Team Emirates | + 1' 07" |
| 6 | Élie Gesbert (FRA) | Arkéa–Samsic | + 1' 22" |
| 7 | Kevin Vermaerke (USA) | Team DSM | + 1' 22" |
| 8 | Henri Vandenabeele (BEL) | Team DSM | + 1' 23" |
| 9 | Rein Taaramäe (EST) | Intermarché–Wanty–Gobert Matériaux | + 1' 28" |
| 10 | Denis Nekrasov (RUS) | Gazprom–RusVelo | + 1' 31" |

=== Stage 5 ===
14 February 2022 — Samail (Al Feyhaa Resthouse) to Jabal al Akhdhar (Green Mountain), 150.5 km (93.5 mi)

Stage 5 Result (1–10)
| Rank | Rider | Team | Time |
|---|---|---|---|
| 1 | Jan Hirt (CZE) | Intermarché–Wanty–Gobert Matériaux | 3h 35' 39" |
| 2 | Kévin Vauquelin (FRA) | Arkéa–Samsic | + 39" |
| 3 | Élie Gesbert (FRA) | Arkéa–Samsic | + 48" |
| 4 | Kevin Colleoni (ITA) | Team BikeExchange–Jayco | + 57" |
| 5 | Rui Costa (POR) | UAE Team Emirates | + 57" |
| 6 | Rein Taaramäe (EST) | Intermarché–Wanty–Gobert Matériaux | + 1' 11" |
| 7 | Anthon Charmig (DEN) | Uno-X Pro Cycling Team | + 1' 11" |
| 8 | Henri Vandenabeele (BEL) | Team DSM | + 1' 19" |
| 9 | Kevin Vermaerke (USA) | Team DSM | + 1' 43" |
| 10 | Mauro Schmid (SUI) | Quick-Step Alpha Vinyl Team | + 1' 43" |

General classification after Stage 5 (1–10)
| Rank | Rider | Team | Time |
|---|---|---|---|
| 1 | Jan Hirt (CZE) | Intermarché–Wanty–Gobert Matériaux | 18h 25' 27" |
| 2 | Fausto Masnada (ITA) | Quick-Step Alpha Vinyl Team | + 1' 00" |
| 3 | Rui Costa (POR) | UAE Team Emirates | + 1' 16" |
| 4 | Élie Gesbert (FRA) | Arkéa–Samsic | + 1' 18" |
| 5 | Anthon Charmig (DEN) | Uno-X Pro Cycling Team | + 1' 18" |
| 6 | Kévin Vauquelin (FRA) | Arkéa–Samsic | + 1' 38" |
| 7 | Kevin Colleoni (ITA) | Team BikeExchange–Jayco | + 1' 50" |
| 8 | Rein Taaramäe (EST) | Intermarché–Wanty–Gobert Matériaux | + 1' 51" |
| 9 | Henri Vandenabeele (BEL) | Team DSM | + 1' 54" |
| 10 | Mauro Schmid (SUI) | Quick-Step Alpha Vinyl Team | + 2' 01" |

=== Stage 6 ===
15 February 2022 — Al Mouj Muscat to Matrah Corniche, 132.5 km (82.3 mi)

Stage 6 Result (1–10)
| Rank | Rider | Team | Time |
|---|---|---|---|
| 1 | Fernando Gaviria (COL) | UAE Team Emirates | 3h 17' 04" |
| 2 | Kaden Groves (AUS) | Team BikeExchange–Jayco | + 0" |
| 3 | Amaury Capiot (BEL) | Arkéa–Samsic | + 0" |
| 4 | Paul Penhoët (FRA) | Groupama–FDJ | + 0" |
| 5 | Hugo Page (FRA) | Intermarché–Wanty–Gobert Matériaux | + 0" |
| 6 | Mark Cavendish (GBR) | Quick-Step Alpha Vinyl Team | + 0" |
| 7 | Felix Groß (GER) | UAE Team Emirates | + 0" |
| 8 | Laurenz Rex (BEL) | Bingoal Pauwels Sauces WB | + 0" |
| 9 | Szymon Sajnok (POL) | Cofidis | + 0" |
| 10 | Kévin Vauquelin (FRA) | Arkéa–Samsic | + 0" |

General classification after Stage 6 (1–10)
| Rank | Rider | Team | Time |
|---|---|---|---|
| 1 | Jan Hirt (CZE) | Intermarché–Wanty–Gobert Matériaux | 22h 35' 43" |
| 2 | Fausto Masnada (ITA) | Quick-Step Alpha Vinyl Team | + 1' 00" |
| 3 | Rui Costa (POR) | UAE Team Emirates | + 1' 16" |
| 4 | Élie Gesbert (FRA) | Arkéa–Samsic | + 1' 18" |
| 5 | Anthon Charmig (DEN) | Uno-X Pro Cycling Team | + 1' 18" |
| 6 | Kévin Vauquelin (FRA) | Arkéa–Samsic | + 1' 38" |
| 7 | Kevin Colleoni (ITA) | Team BikeExchange–Jayco | + 1' 50" |
| 8 | Rein Taaramäe (EST) | Intermarché–Wanty–Gobert Matériaux | + 1' 51" |
| 9 | Henri Vandenabeele (BEL) | Team DSM | + 1' 54" |
| 10 | Mauro Schmid (SUI) | Quick-Step Alpha Vinyl Team | + 2' 01" |

== Classification leadership table ==
Classification leadership by stage
| Stage | Winner | General classification | Points classification | Aggressive rider classification | Young rider classification | Team classification |
|---|---|---|---|---|---|---|
| 1 | Fernando Gaviria | Fernando Gaviria | Fernando Gaviria | Peio Goikoetxea | Kaden Groves | UAE Team Emirates |
| 2 | Mark Cavendish | Mark Cavendish | Mark Cavendish | Peio Goikoetxea | Kaden Groves | UAE Team Emirates |
| 3 | Anthon Charmig | Anthon Charmig | Mark Cavendish | Peio Goikoetxea | Anthon Charmig | Intermarché–Wanty–Gobert Matériaux |
| 4 | Fausto Masnada | Fausto Masnada | Mark Cavendish | Peio Goikoetxea | Anthon Charmig | Intermarché–Wanty–Gobert Matériaux |
| 5 | Jan Hirt | Jan Hirt | Jan Hirt | Peio Goikoetxea | Anthon Charmig | Arkéa–Samsic |
| 6 | Fernando Gaviria | Jan Hirt | Fernando Gaviria | Peio Goikoetxea | Anthon Charmig | Arkéa–Samsic |
| Final | | Jan Hirt | Fernando Gaviria | Peio Goikoetxea | Anthon Charmig | Arkéa–Samsic |

- On stage 2, Mark Cavendish, who was second in the points classification, wore the green jersey, because first-placed Fernando Gaviria wore the red jersey as the leader of the general classification. On stage 3, Gaviria wore the green jersey in place of Cavendish, who took over the lead in both classifications.
- On stage 4, Denis Nekrasov, who was second in the young rider classification, wore the white jersey, because first-placed Anthon Charmig wore the red jersey as the leader of the general classification.
- On stage 6, Fausto Masnada, who was second in the points classification, wore the green jersey, because first-placed Jan Hirt wore the red jersey as the leader of the general classification.

== Final classification standings ==
Legend
| Denotes the winner of the general classification | Denotes the winner of the aggressive rider classification |
| Denotes the winner of the points classification | Denotes the winner of the young rider classification |

=== General classification ===
Final general classification (1–10)
| Rank | Rider | Team | Time |
|---|---|---|---|
| 1 | Jan Hirt (CZE) | Intermarché–Wanty–Gobert Matériaux | 22h 35' 43" |
| 2 | Fausto Masnada (ITA) | Quick-Step Alpha Vinyl Team | + 1' 00" |
| 3 | Rui Costa (POR) | UAE Team Emirates | + 1' 16" |
| 4 | Élie Gesbert (FRA) | Arkéa–Samsic | + 1' 18" |
| 5 | Anthon Charmig (DEN) | Uno-X Pro Cycling Team | + 1' 18" |
| 6 | Kévin Vauquelin (FRA) | Arkéa–Samsic | + 1' 38" |
| 7 | Kevin Colleoni (ITA) | Team BikeExchange–Jayco | + 1' 50" |
| 8 | Rein Taaramäe (EST) | Intermarché–Wanty–Gobert Matériaux | + 1' 51" |
| 9 | Henri Vandenabeele (BEL) | Team DSM | + 1' 54" |
| 10 | Mauro Schmid (SUI) | Quick-Step Alpha Vinyl Team | + 2' 01" |

=== Points classification ===
Final points classification (1–10)
| Rank | Rider | Team | Points |
|---|---|---|---|
| 1 | Fernando Gaviria (COL) | UAE Team Emirates | 37 |
| 2 | Kaden Groves (AUS) | Team BikeExchange–Jayco | 33 |
| 3 | Jan Hirt (CZE) | Intermarché–Wanty–Gobert Matériaux | 32 |
| 4 | Mark Cavendish (GBR) | Quick-Step Alpha Vinyl Team | 28 |
| 5 | Amaury Capiot (BEL) | Arkéa–Samsic | 28 |
| 6 | Kévin Vauquelin (FRA) | Arkéa–Samsic | 25 |
| 7 | Fausto Masnada (ITA) | Quick-Step Alpha Vinyl Team | 24 |
| 8 | Anthon Charmig (DEN) | Uno-X Pro Cycling Team | 24 |
| 9 | Rui Costa (POR) | UAE Team Emirates | 21 |
| 10 | Élie Gesbert (FRA) | Arkéa–Samsic | 18 |

=== Aggressive rider classification ===
Final aggressive rider classification (1–10)
| Rank | Rider | Team | Points |
|---|---|---|---|
| 1 | Peio Goikoetxea (ESP) | Euskaltel–Euskadi | 18 |
| 2 | Antonio Angulo (ESP) | Euskaltel–Euskadi | 17 |
| 3 | Samuele Zoccarato (ITA) | Bardiani–CSF–Faizanè | 14 |
| 4 | Victor Langellotti (MON) | Burgos BH | 8 |
| 5 | Jan Hirt (CZE) | Intermarché–Wanty–Gobert Matériaux | 6 |
| 6 | Mauro Schmid (SUI) | Quick-Step Alpha Vinyl Team | 6 |
| 7 | Kévin Vauquelin (FRA) | Arkéa–Samsic | 5 |
| 8 | Mark Cavendish (GBR) | Quick-Step Alpha Vinyl Team | 5 |
| 9 | Jonas Iversby Hvideberg (NOR) | Team DSM | 4 |
| 10 | Anthon Charmig (DEN) | Uno-X Pro Cycling Team | 3 |

=== Young rider classification ===
Final young rider classification (1–10)
| Rank | Rider | Team | Time |
|---|---|---|---|
| 1 | Anthon Charmig (DEN) | Uno-X Pro Cycling Team | 22h 37' 01" |
| 2 | Kévin Vauquelin (FRA) | Arkéa–Samsic | + 20" |
| 3 | Kevin Colleoni (ITA) | Team BikeExchange–Jayco | + 32" |
| 4 | Henri Vandenabeele (BEL) | Team DSM | + 36" |
| 5 | Mauro Schmid (SUI) | Quick-Step Alpha Vinyl Team | + 43" |
| 6 | Kevin Vermaerke (USA) | Team DSM | + 59" |
| 7 | Filippo Zana (ITA) | Bardiani–CSF–Faizanè | + 1' 56" |
| 8 | Denis Nekrasov (RUS) | Gazprom–RusVelo | + 2' 16" |
| 9 | Luca Covili (ITA) | Bardiani–CSF–Faizanè | + 2' 23" |
| 10 | Hugo Toumire (FRA) | Cofidis | + 3' 14" |

=== Team classification ===
Final team classification (1–10)
| Rank | Team | Time |
|---|---|---|
| 1 | Arkéa–Samsic | 67h 53' 48" |
| 2 | Intermarché–Wanty–Gobert Matériaux | + 7" |
| 3 | Team DSM | + 2' 01" |
| 4 | Bardiani–CSF–Faizanè | + 9' 31" |
| 5 | Quick-Step Alpha Vinyl Team | + 10' 05" |
| 6 | Gazprom–RusVelo | + 10' 44" |
| 7 | Cofidis | + 11' 05" |
| 8 | UAE Team Emirates | + 11' 35" |
| 9 | Team BikeExchange–Jayco | + 13' 58" |
| 10 | Groupama–FDJ | + 20' 33" |
