= Vandenabeele =

Vandenabeele is a surname. Notable people with the surname include:

- Éric Vandenabeele (born 1991), French footballer
- Henri Vandenabeele (born 2000), Belgian cyclist
