= 2022 Czech Cycling Tour =

Czech cycling race

2022 Sazka Tour
2022 UCI Europe Tour
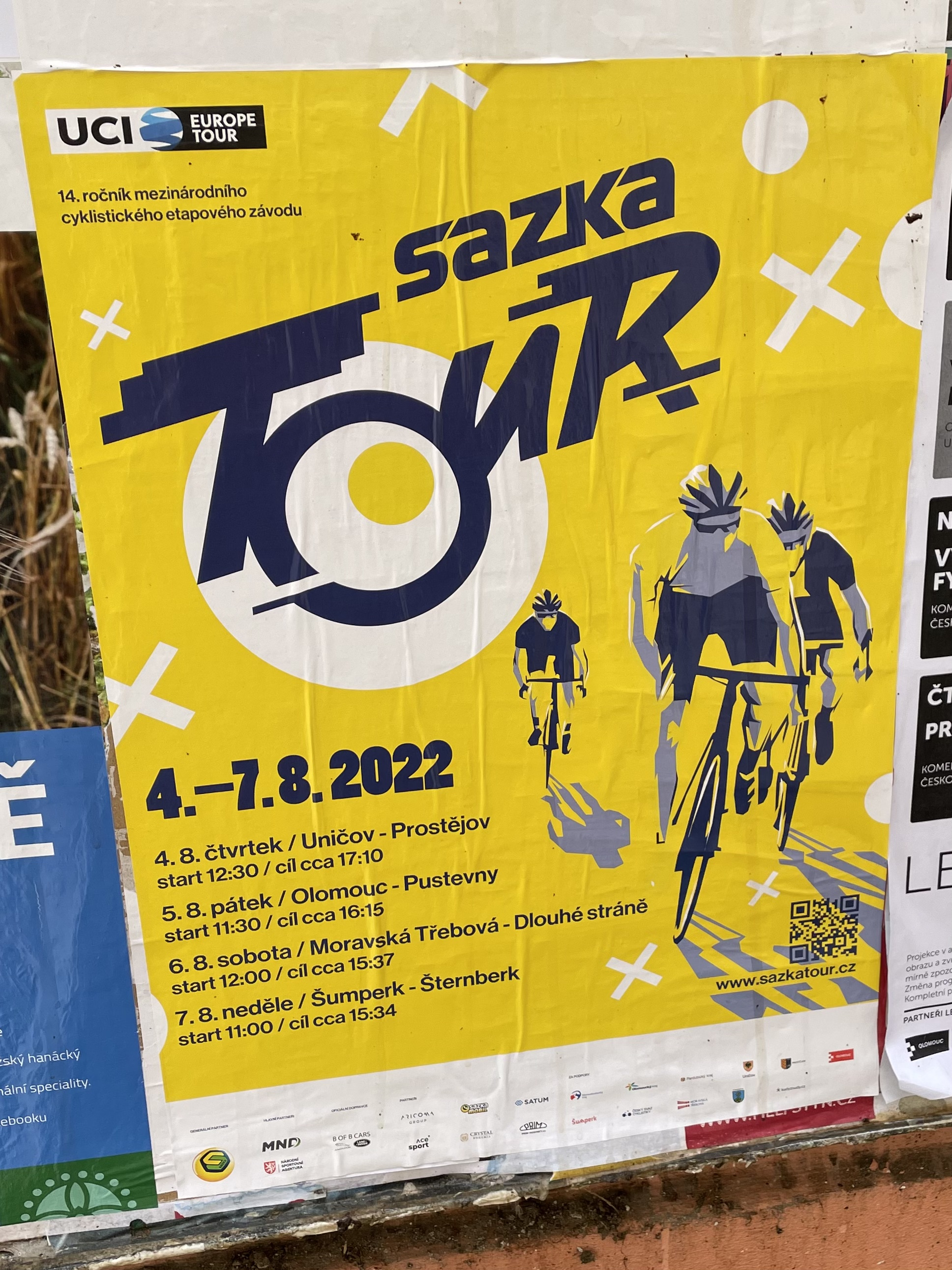
- Poster for 2022 Czech Cycling Tour in Olomouc

Race details
- Dates: 4–7 August 2022
- Stages: 4
- Distance: 700.1 km (435.0 mi)
- Winning time: 17h 34' 43"

Results
Jersey awarded to the overall winner	Winner	Lorenzo Rota (ITA)	(Intermarché–Wanty–Gobert Matériaux)
	Second	Anthon Charmig (DEN)	(Uno-X Pro Cycling Team)
	Third	Kevin Colleoni (ITA)	(Team BikeExchange–Jayco)
Jersey awarded to the points classification winner	Points	Lorenzo Rota (ITA)	(Intermarché–Wanty–Gobert Matériaux)
Jersey awarded to the mountains classification winner	Mountains	Tim van Dijke (NED)	(Team Jumbo–Visma)
Jersey awarded to the young rider classification winner	Young rider	Johannes Staune-Mittet (NOR)	(Team Jumbo–Visma)
	Team	Intermarché–Wanty–Gobert Matériaux	

The 2022 Sazka Tour was a road cycling stage race that took place between 4 and 7 August 2022 in Czech Republic. The race was rated as a category 2.1 event on the 2022 UCI Europe Tour calendar, and was the 13th edition of the Sazka Tour.

== Teams ==
Three of the 18 UCI WorldTeams, six UCI ProTeams, and thirteen UCI Continental teams made up the 22 teams that participated in the race.

UCI WorldTeams

- Bora–Hansgrohe
- Intermarché–Wanty–Gobert Matériaux
- Team BikeExchange–Jayco

UCI ProTeams

- Bardiani–CSF–Faizanè
- Bingoal Pauwels Sauces WB
- Drone Hopper–Androni Giocattoli
- Human Powered Health
- Sport Vlaanderen–Baloise
- Uno-X Pro Cycling Team

UCI Continental Teams

- Abloc CT
- Adria Mobil
- ATT Investments
- Development Team DSM
- Dukla Banská Bystrica
- Elkov–Kasper
- Jumbo–Visma Development Team
- Maloja Pushbikers
- Santic–Wibatech
- Team Felbermayr–Simplon Wels
- Team Lotto–Kern Haus
- Team Vorarlberg
- Voster ATS Team

== Route ==
Stage characteristics and winners
Stage	Date	Course	Distance	Type	Stage winner
1	4 August	Uničov to Prostějov	181.5 km (112.8 mi)	Hilly stage	Rune Herregodts (BEL)
2	5 August	Olomouc to Pustevny	189.3 km (117.6 mi)	Mountain stage	Lorenzo Rota (ITA)
3	6 August	Moravská Třebová to Dlouhé stráně	149.4 km (92.8 mi)	Mountain stage	Kamiel Bonneu (BEL)
4	7 August	Šumperk to Šternberk	179.9 km (111.8 mi)	Hilly stage	Alexis Guérin (FRA)
Total			700.1 km (435.0 mi)		

== Stages ==
=== Stage 1 ===
4 August 2022 – Uničov to Prostějov, 181.5 km (112.8 mi)

Stage 1 Result (1–10)
Rank	Rider	Team	Time
1	Rune Herregodts (BEL)	Sport Vlaanderen–Baloise	4h 24' 00"
2	Johan Meens (BEL)	Bingoal Pauwels Sauces WB	+ 0"
3	Michael Kukrle (CZE)	Elkov–Kasper	+ 0"
4	Jan Kašpar (CZE)	ATT Investments	+ 0"
5	Alexander Tarlton (GER)	Team Lotto–Kern Haus	+ 3"
6	Filippo Fortin (ITA)	Maloja Pushbikers	+ 22"
7	Tim van Dijke (NED)	Jumbo–Visma Development Team	+ 22"
8	Pavel Bittner (CZE)	Development Team DSM	+ 23"
9	Arvid de Kleijn (NED)	Human Powered Health	+ 23"
10	Jonas Koch (GER)	Bora–Hansgrohe	+ 23"

General classification after Stage 1 (1–10)
Rank	Rider	Team	Time
1	Rune Herregodts (BEL)	Sport Vlaanderen–Baloise	4h 23' 48"
2	Johan Meens (BEL)	Bingoal Pauwels Sauces WB	+ 5"
3	Michael Kukrle (CZE)	Elkov–Kasper	+ 8"
4	Jan Kašpar (CZE)	ATT Investments	+ 9"
5	Alexander Tarlton (GER)	Team Lotto–Kern Haus	+ 15"
6	Tomáš Bárta (CZE)	ATT Investments	+ 32"
7	Ruben Apers (BEL)	Sport Vlaanderen–Baloise	+ 33"
8	Filippo Fortin (ITA)	Maloja Pushbikers	+ 34"
9	Tim van Dijke (NED)	Jumbo–Visma Development Team	+ 34"
10	Jonas Koch (GER)	Bora–Hansgrohe	+ 34"

=== Stage 2 ===
5 August 2022 – Olomouc to Pustevny, 189.3 km (117.6 mi)

Stage 2 Result (1–10)
Rank	Rider	Team	Time
1	Lorenzo Rota (ITA)	Intermarché–Wanty–Gobert Matériaux	4h 51' 46"
2	Oscar Onley (GBR)	Team DSM	+ 0"
3	Domenico Pozzovivo (ITA)	Intermarché–Wanty–Gobert Matériaux	+ 0"
4	Anthon Charmig (DEN)	Uno-X Pro Cycling Team	+ 3"
5	Kevin Colleoni (ITA)	Team BikeExchange–Jayco	+ 3"
6	Filippo Zana (ITA)	Bardiani–CSF–Faizanè	+ 3"
7	Archie Ryan (IRL)	Jumbo–Visma Development Team	+ 3"
8	Riccardo Zoidl (AUT)	Team Vorarlberg	+ 9"
9	Johannes Staune-Mittet (NOR)	Jumbo–Visma Development Team	+ 11"
10	Luca Covili (ITA)	Bardiani–CSF–Faizanè	+ 12"

General classification after Stage 2 (1–10)
Rank	Rider	Team	Time
1	Lorenzo Rota (ITA)	Intermarché–Wanty–Gobert Matériaux	9h 16' 09"
2	Domenico Pozzovivo (ITA)	Intermarché–Wanty–Gobert Matériaux	+ 0"
3	Oscar Onley (GBR)	Team DSM	+ 0"
4	Kevin Colleoni (ITA)	Team BikeExchange–Jayco	+ 3"
5	Archie Ryan (IRL)	Jumbo–Visma Development Team	+ 3"
6	Anthon Charmig (DEN)	Uno-X Pro Cycling Team	+ 3"
7	Filippo Zana (ITA)	Bardiani–CSF–Faizanè	+ 3"
8	Riccardo Zoidl (AUT)	Team Vorarlberg	+ 9"
9	Johannes Staune-Mittet (NOR)	Jumbo–Visma Development Team	+ 11"
10	Luca Covili (ITA)	Bardiani–CSF–Faizanè	+ 12"

=== Stage 3 ===
6 August 2022 – Moravská Třebová to Dlouhé stráně, 149.4 km (92.8 mi)

Stage 3 Result (1–10)
Rank	Rider	Team	Time
1	Kamiel Bonneu (BEL)	Sport Vlaanderen–Baloise	3h 49' 24"
2	Anthon Charmig (DEN)	Uno-X Pro Cycling Team	+ 0"
3	Johannes Staune-Mittet (NOR)	Jumbo–Visma Development Team	+ 0"
4	Kevin Colleoni (ITA)	Team BikeExchange–Jayco	+ 2"
5	Filippo Zana (ITA)	Bardiani–CSF–Faizanè	+ 2"
6	Lorenzo Rota (ITA)	Intermarché–Wanty–Gobert Matériaux	+ 2"
7	Oscar Onley (GBR)	Team DSM	+ 6"
8	Eduardo Sepúlveda (ARG)	Drone Hopper–Androni Giocattoli	+ 9"
9	Luca Covili (ITA)	Bardiani–CSF–Faizanè	+ 9"
10	Riccardo Zoidl (AUT)	Team Vorarlberg	+ 9"

General classification after Stage 3 (1–10)
Rank	Rider	Team	Time
1	Lorenzo Rota (ITA)	Intermarché–Wanty–Gobert Matériaux	13h 05' 35"
2	Anthon Charmig (DEN)	Uno-X Pro Cycling Team	+ 1"
3	Kevin Colleoni (ITA)	Team BikeExchange–Jayco	+ 3"
4	Filippo Zana (ITA)	Bardiani–CSF–Faizanè	+ 3"
5	Oscar Onley (GBR)	Team DSM	+ 4"
6	Johannes Staune-Mittet (NOR)	Jumbo–Visma Development Team	+ 9"
7	Archie Ryan (IRL)	Jumbo–Visma Development Team	+ 15"
8	Riccardo Zoidl (AUT)	Team Vorarlberg	+ 16"
9	Luca Covili (ITA)	Bardiani–CSF–Faizanè	+ 19"
10	Rein Taaramäe (EST)	Intermarché–Wanty–Gobert Matériaux	+ 28"

=== Stage 4 ===
7 August 2022 – Šumperk to Šternberk, 179.9 km (111.8 mi)

Stage 4 Result (1–10)
Rank	Rider	Team	Time
1	Alexis Guérin (FRA)	Team Vorarlberg	4h 28' 45"
2	Michael Kukrle (CZE)	Elkov–Kasper	+ 4"
3	Lorenzo Rota (ITA)	Intermarché–Wanty–Gobert Matériaux	+ 28"
4	Anthon Charmig (DEN)	Uno-X Pro Cycling Team	+ 28"
5	Max Poole (GBR)	Team DSM	+ 28"
6	Filippo Zana (ITA)	Bardiani–CSF–Faizanè	+ 28"
7	Kevin Colleoni (ITA)	Team BikeExchange–Jayco	+ 28"
8	Frederik Wandahl (DEN)	Bora–Hansgrohe	+ 28"
9	Mathijs Paasschens (NED)	Bingoal Pauwels Sauces WB	+ 28"
10	Johannes Staune-Mittet (NOR)	Jumbo–Visma Development Team	+ 28"

Final general classification (1–10)
Rank	Rider	Team	Time
1	Lorenzo Rota (ITA)	Intermarché–Wanty–Gobert Matériaux	17h 34' 43"
2	Anthon Charmig (DEN)	Uno-X Pro Cycling Team	+ 6"
3	Kevin Colleoni (ITA)	Team BikeExchange–Jayco	+ 8"
4	Filippo Zana (ITA)	Bardiani–CSF–Faizanè	+ 8"
5	Johannes Staune-Mittet (NOR)	Jumbo–Visma Development Team	+ 14"
6	Archie Ryan (IRL)	Jumbo–Visma Development Team	+ 20"
7	Oscar Onley (GBR)	Team DSM	+ 27"
8	Riccardo Zoidl (AUT)	Team Vorarlberg	+ 39"
9	Luca Covili (ITA)	Bardiani–CSF–Faizanè	+ 42"
10	Max Poole (GBR)	Team DSM	+ 48"

== Classification leadership table ==
Classification leadership by stage
Stage	Winner	General classification	Points classification	Mountains classification	Young rider classification	Team classification
1	Rune Herregodts	Rune Herregodts	Rune Herregodts	Johan Meens	Jan Kašpar	Sport Vlaanderen–Baloise
2	Lorenzo Rota	Lorenzo Rota	Rune Herregodts	Paul Double	Oscar Onley	Intermarché–Wanty–Gobert Matériaux
3	Kamiel Bonneu	Lorenzo Rota	Lorenzo Rota	Jan Kašpar	Oscar Onley	Intermarché–Wanty–Gobert Matériaux
4	Alexis Guérin	Lorenzo Rota	Lorenzo Rota	Tim van Dijke	Johannes Staune-Mittet	Intermarché–Wanty–Gobert Matériaux
Final		Lorenzo Rota	Lorenzo Rota	Tim van Dijke	Johannes Staune-Mittet	Intermarché–Wanty–Gobert Matériaux

== Final classification standings ==
Legend
Denotes the winner of the general classification	Denotes the winner of the mountains classification
Denotes the winner of the points classification	Denotes the winner of the young rider classification

=== General classification ===
Final general classification (1–10)
Rank	Rider	Team	Time
1	Lorenzo Rota (ITA)	Intermarché–Wanty–Gobert Matériaux	17h 34' 43"
2	Anthon Charmig (DEN)	Uno-X Pro Cycling Team	+ 6"
3	Kevin Colleoni (ITA)	Team BikeExchange–Jayco	+ 8"
4	Filippo Zana (ITA)	Bardiani–CSF–Faizanè	+ 8"
5	Johannes Staune-Mittet (NOR)	Jumbo–Visma Development Team	+ 14"
6	Archie Ryan (IRL)	Jumbo–Visma Development Team	+ 20"
7	Oscar Onley (GBR)	Team DSM	+ 27"
8	Riccardo Zoidl (AUT)	Team Vorarlberg	+ 39"
9	Luca Covili (ITA)	Bardiani–CSF–Faizanè	+ 42"
10	Max Poole (GBR)	Team DSM	+ 48"

=== Points classification ===
Final points classification (1–10)
Rank	Rider	Team	Points
1	Lorenzo Rota (ITA)	Intermarché–Wanty–Gobert Matériaux	52
2	Anthon Charmig (DEN)	Uno-X Pro Cycling Team	48
3	Michael Kukrle (CZE)	Elkov–Kasper	46
4	Kevin Colleoni (ITA)	Team BikeExchange–Jayco	35
5	Filippo Zana (ITA)	Bardiani–CSF–Faizanè	32
6	Alexis Guérin (FRA)	Team Vorarlberg	31
7	Rune Herregodts (BEL)	Sport Vlaanderen–Baloise	31
8	Kamiel Bonneu (BEL)	Sport Vlaanderen–Baloise	32
9	Johannes Staune-Mittet (NOR)	Jumbo–Visma Development Team	29
10	Oscar Onley (GBR)	Team DSM	29

=== Mountains classification ===
Final mountains classification (1–10)
Rank	Rider	Team	Points
1	Tim van Dijke (NED)	Team Jumbo–Visma	39
2	Jan Kašpar (CZE)	ATT Investments	23
3	Paul Double (GBR)	Human Powered Health	23
4	Jack Burke (CAN)	Team Felbermayr–Simplon Wels	19
5	Alexis Guérin (FRA)	Team Vorarlberg	18
6	Michael Kukrle (CZE)	Elkov–Kasper	16
7	Mathijs Paasschens (NED)	Bingoal Pauwels Sauces WB	10
8	Lorenzo Milesi (ITA)	Team DSM	10
9	Daniel Turek (CZE)	Team Felbermayr–Simplon Wels	9
10	Karel Camrda (CZE)	ATT Investments	8

=== Young rider classification ===
Final young rider classification (1–10)
Rank	Rider	Team	Time
1	Johannes Staune-Mittet (NOR)	Jumbo–Visma Development Team	17h 34' 57"
2	Archie Ryan (IRL)	Team Jumbo–Visma	+ 6"
3	Oscar Onley (GBR)	Team DSM	+ 13"
4	Max Poole (GBR)	Team DSM	+ 34"
5	Andrii Ponomar (UKR)	Drone Hopper–Androni Giocattoli	+ 3' 36"
6	Lars Boven (NED)	Team Jumbo–Visma	+ 5' 41"
7	Santiago Umba (COL)	Drone Hopper–Androni Giocattoli	+ 7' 13"
8	Callum Macleod (GBR)	Abloc CT	+ 8' 19"
9	Alexander Tarlton (GER)	Team Lotto–Kern Haus	+ 9' 51"
10	Lorenzo Milesi (ITA)	Team DSM	+ 9' 51"

=== Teams classification ===
Final teams classification (1–10)
Rank	Team	Time
1	Intermarché–Wanty–Gobert Matériaux	52h 45' 52"
2	Team Jumbo–Visma	+ 57"
3	Team Vorarlberg	+ 2' 51"
4	Bardiani–CSF–Faizanè	+ 4' 14"
5	Drone Hopper–Androni Giocattoli	+ 8' 24"
6	Bora–Hansgrohe	+ 9' 08"
7	Team BikeExchange–Jayco	+ 9' 37"
8	Team DSM	+ 9' 39"
9	Uno-X Pro Cycling Team	+ 21' 05"
10	Bingoal Pauwels Sauces WB	+ 21' 37"
