= Oier Lazkano =

Spanish cyclist (born 1999)

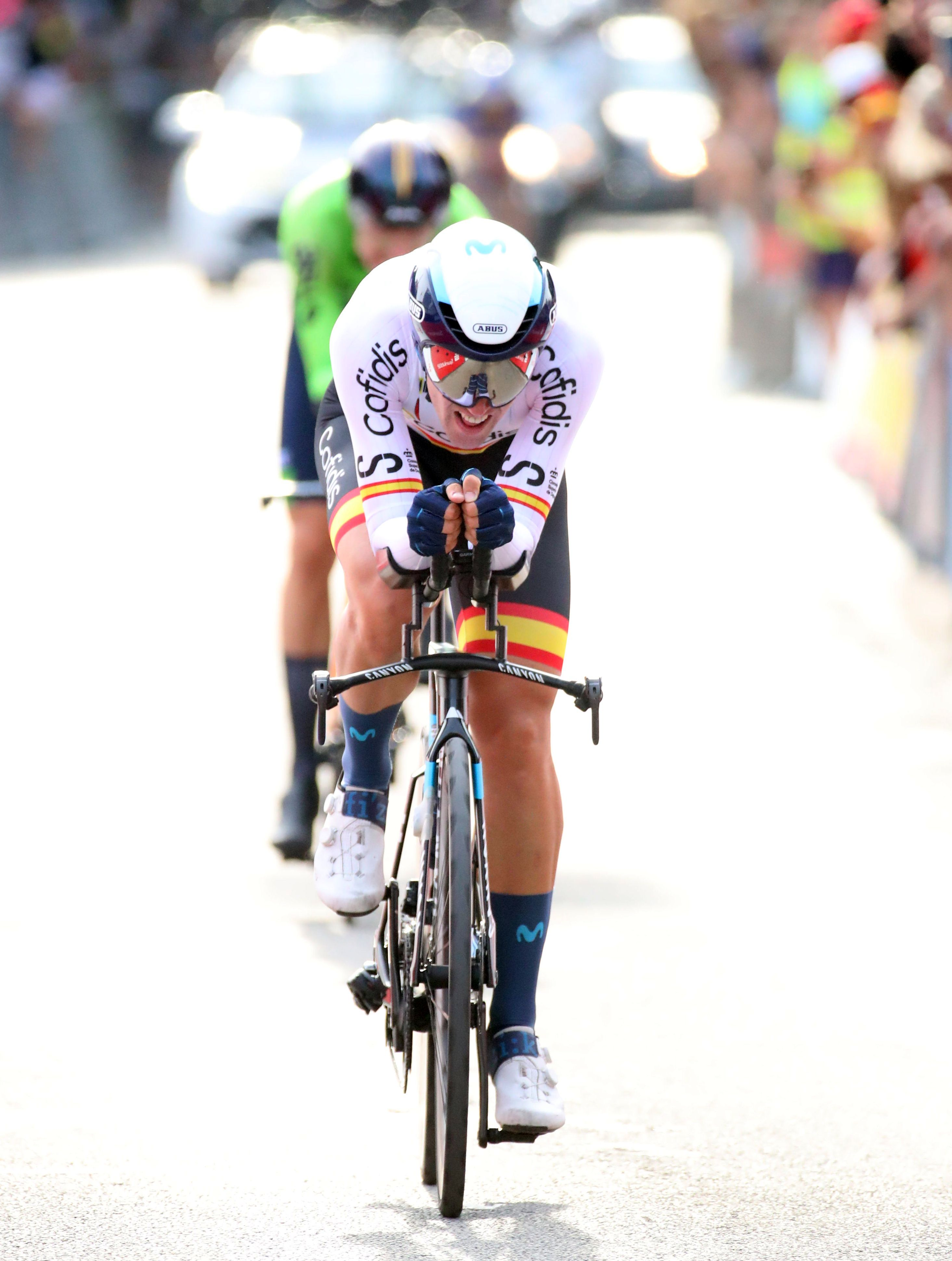
- Lazkano at the 2022 European Road Championships

Personal information
- Full name: Oier Lazkano López
- Born: 7 November 1999 (age 26) Vitoria-Gasteiz, Spain
- Height: 1.89 m (6 ft 2 in)
- Weight: 74 kg (163 lb)

Cycling career
- Sport: Cycling
- Discipline: Road
- Role: Rider
- Rider type: Rouleur

Amateur teams
- 2016–2017: Elproex Iturribero
- 2018–2019: Caja Rural–Seguros RGA Amateur
- 2019: Caja Rural–Seguros RGA (stagiaire)

Professional teams
- 2020–2021: Caja Rural–Seguros RGA
- 2022–2024: Movistar Team
- 2025: Red Bull–Bora–Hansgrohe

Major wins
- Stage races Boucles de la Mayenne (2023) One-day races and Classics National Road Race Championships (2023)

Oier Lazkano López (born 7 November 1999, in Vitoria-Gasteiz) is a Spanish cyclist, who as of 2025 rides for UCI WorldTeam Red Bull–Bora–Hansgrohe.

Lazkano was provisionally suspended by the UCI on 30 October 2025, due to "unexplained abnormalities" in his biological passport, a record of an athlete's biomarkers over time. Lazkano issued a statement that he "never used doping substances or prohibited methods" and will contest the suspension.

== Career ==
Lazkano turned professional in 2020 with Caja Rural–Seguros RGA, after riding with the team as a stagiaire the year prior. In September, he took his first pro win on stage three of the Volta a Portugal. He entered his first Grand Tour the following year, Vuelta a España, where he was given the combativity award on stage five after spending most of the day in the breakaway.

In 2022, Lazkano joined Movistar Team on a three year contract, and won a stage of the Tour de Wallonie. In June 2023, he became the Spanish road race champion, after a successful spring season, winning the Boucles de la Mayenne and finishing second at the Dwars door Vlaanderen. In August, he won a stage of the Vuelta a Burgos.

In February 2024, he soloed to a win at the Clásica Jaén Paraíso Interior one-day race, followed by placing third in Kuurne–Brussels–Kuurne two weeks later.

== Major results ==
2017
4th Time trial, National Junior Road Championships
2020 (1 pro win)
1st Stage 3 Volta a Portugal
10th Overall Belgrade–Banja Luka
2021
Combativity award Stage 5 Vuelta a España
2022 (1)
1st Stage 2 Tour de Wallonie
2nd Time trial, National Road Championships
2023 (4)
National Road Championships

1st Road race
2nd Time trial

1st Overall Boucles de la Mayenne

1st Young rider classification
1st Stage 1

1st Stage 4 Vuelta a Burgos
2nd Dwars door Vlaanderen
4th Prueba Villafranca de Ordizia
Combativity award Stage 8 Vuelta a España
2024 (1)
1st Clásica Jaén Paraíso Interior
National Road Championships

2nd Road race
4th Time trial

3rd Kuurne–Brussels–Kuurne
9th Overall Critérium du Dauphiné
Combativity award Stage 4 Tour de France
Combativity award Stage 8 Vuelta a España

=== Grand Tour general classification results timeline ===
Grand Tour	2021	2022	2023	2024
Giro d'Italia	—	98	—	—
Tour de France	—	—	—	79
Vuelta a España	DNF	—	83	92

=== Classics results timeline ===
Monument	2022	2023	2024
Milan–San Remo	—	134	—
Tour of Flanders	—	DNF	73
Paris–Roubaix	55	102	DNF
Liège–Bastogne–Liège	DNF	—	64
Giro di Lombardia	—	—	—
Classic	2022	2023	2024
Omloop Het Nieuwsblad	63	—	121
Kuurne–Brussels–Kuurne	DNF	—	3
E3 Saxo Bank Classic	—	—	14
Gent–Wevelgem	—	—	—
Dwars door Vlaanderen	—	2	47

Legend
—	Did not compete
DNF	Did not finish
