= Timo Kielich =

Belgian cyclist

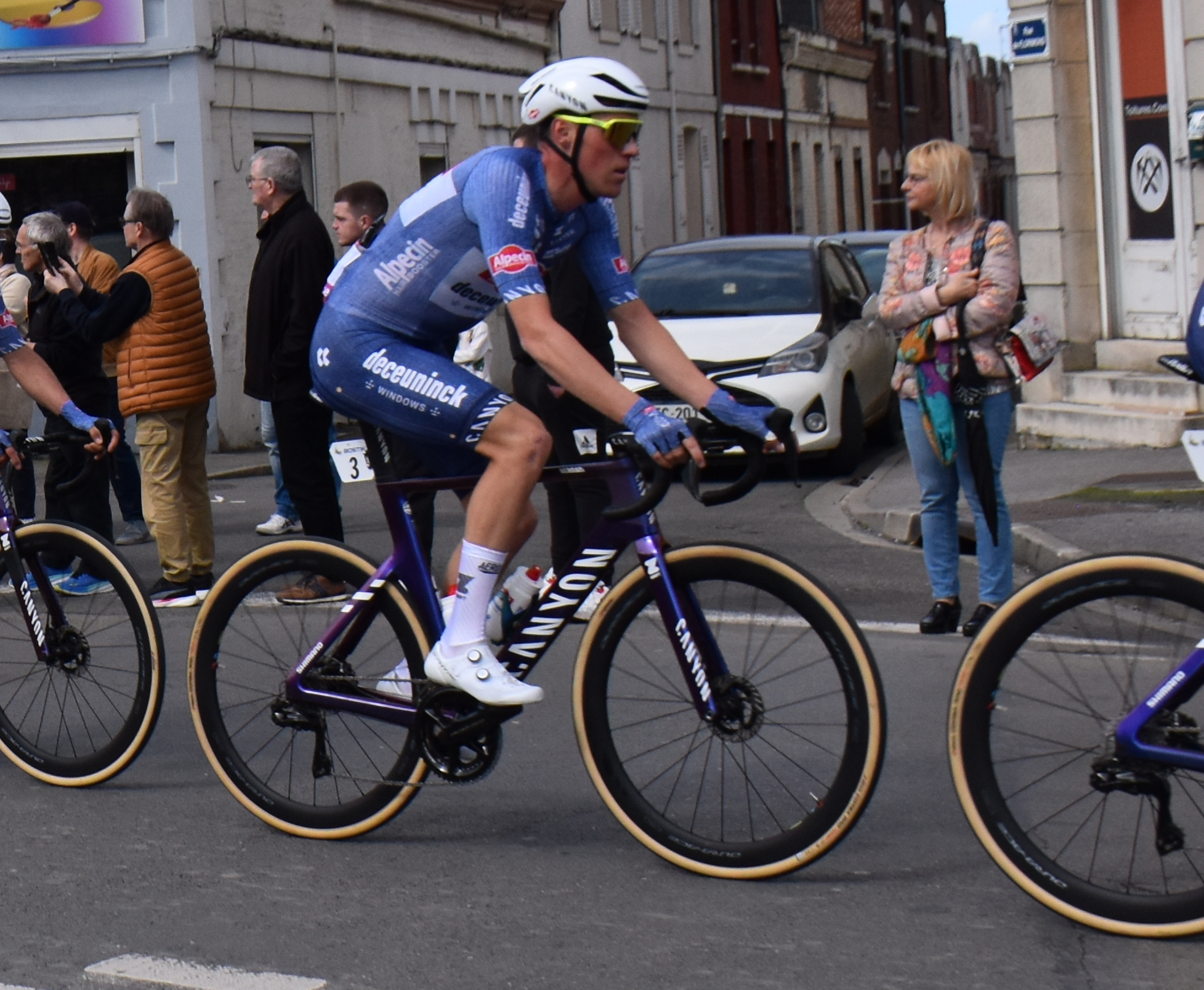
- Kielich at the 2024 Paris–Roubaix

Personal information
- Born: 5 August 1999 (age 27) Sint-Truiden, Belgium
- Height: 1.85 m (6 ft 1 in)
- Weight: 73 kg (161 lb)

Cycling career
- Sport: Cycling
- Current team: Visma–Lease a Bike
- Disciplines: Cyclo-cross; Road; Mountain biking; Gravel
- Role: Rider

Professional teams
- 2018: ERA
- 2018: Corendon–Circus
- 2019–2020: Iko–Beobank (cyclo-cross)
- 2020: Alpecin–Fenix (stagiaire)
- 2020–2021: Credishop–Fristads (cyclo-cross)
- 2021–2023: Alpecin–Fenix Development Team (road)
- 2021–2023: IKO–Crelan (cyclo-cross)
- 2024–2025: Alpecin–Deceuninck
- 2026–: Visma–Lease a Bike
Medal record
Men's cyclo-cross
Representing Belgium
World Championships
Bronze medal – third place	2021 Ostend	Under-23 race

Timo Kielich (born 5 August 1999) is a Belgian cyclist, who currently rides for UCI WorldTeam Visma–Lease a Bike. He won the bronze medal at the 2021 UCI Cyclo-cross Under-23 World Championships.

== Major results ==
=== Cyclo-cross ===
2015–2016
Junior Soudal Classics

2nd Hasselt

2016–2017
Junior DVV Trophy

2nd Koppenberg
3rd Loenhout

UCI Junior World Cup

3rd Hoogerheide

3rd UEC European Junior Championships
3rd National Junior Championships
3rd Junior Overijse
2018–2019
1st National Under-23 Championships
1st Under-23 Overijse
Under-23 DVV Trophy

1st Hamme
2nd Antwerpen
2nd Loenhout
2nd Niel

2nd Under-23 Geraardsbergen
UCI Under-23 World Cup

3rd Heusden-Zolder

2019–2020
2nd UEC European Under-23 Championships
Under-23 DVV Trophy

2nd Baal
2nd Loenhout
3rd Hamme
3rd Kortrijk
3rd Brussels

2020–2021
3rd UCI World Under-23 Championships

=== Gravel ===
2023
UCI World Series

1st Limburg

=== Mountain bike ===
2016
1st Cross-country, National Junior Championships
2018
1st Cross-country, National Under-23 Championships
2019
1st Cross-country, National Under-23 Championships
2020
1st Marathon, National Championships

=== Road ===
2020
9th Grand Prix d'Isbergues
2021
3rd Overall Tour of Bulgaria

1st Stage 5

4th Overall Tour d'Eure-et-Loir
2022
1st Overall Course de Solidarność et des Champions Olympiques

1st Stage 2

4th Grote Prijs Rik Van Looy
6th Antwerp Port Epic
10th Heistse Pijl
2023 (1 pro win)
Tour de Wallonie

1st Points classification
1st Stage 3

2nd Antwerp Port Epic
3rd Grand Prix de Denain
3rd Circuit de Wallonie
3rd GP Vermarc
4th Nokere Koerse
6th Overall Oberösterreich Rundfahrt

1st Points classification
1st Stage 1 & 2

8th Flèche Ardennaise
9th Druivenkoers Overijse
2024 (1)
1st Volta NXT Classic
5th Le Samyn
2025 (1)
1st Antwerp Port Epic
1st Mountains classification, Tour de Pologne
6th Grand Prix de Wallonie
8th Grand Prix de Fourmies

==== Grand Tour general classification results timeline ====
Grand Tour	2024	2025
Giro d'Italia	111	86
Tour de France	—	
Vuelta a España	—	

Legend
—	Did not compete
DNF	Did not finish
