= Kevin Colleoni =

Italian cyclist (born 1999)

Personal information
- Born: 11 November 1999 (age 26) Ponte San Pietro, Italy
- Height: 1.8 m (5 ft 11 in)
- Weight: 66 kg (146 lb)

Cycling career
- Sport: Cycling
- Discipline: Road
- Role: Rider

Professional teams
- 2018–2020: Biesse–Carrera Gavardo
- 2021–2023: Team BikeExchange
- 2024–2025: Intermarché–Wanty

Kevin Colleoni (born 11 November 1999 in Ponte San Pietro) is an Italian former professional road cyclist, who last rode for UCI WorldTeam Intermarché–Wanty.

He is in a relationship with fellow pro cyclist Eleonora Gasparrini. He announced his retirement in February 2026.

== Major results ==
2017
5th Trofeo Emilio Paganessi
2019
2nd GP Capodarco
4th Overall Giro della Friuli Venezia Giulia

1st Young rider classification

4th G.P. Palio del Recioto
5th Trofeo Città di San Vendemiano
8th Il Piccolo Lombardia
2020
2nd Trofeo Città di San Vendemiano
3rd Overall Giro Ciclistico d'Italia
9th Il Piccolo Lombardia
2021
9th Overall Tour de Hongrie
2022
3rd Overall Czech Cycling Tour
7th Overall Tour of Oman
10th Per sempre Alfredo

=== Grand Tour general classification results timeline ===
Grand Tour	2024	2025
Giro d'Italia	98	108
Tour de France		
Vuelta a España		

Legend
—	Did not compete
DNF	Did not finish
