= Peio Goikoetxea =

Spanish road bicycle racer

Personal information
- Full name: Peio Goikoetxea Goiogana
- Born: 14 February 1992 (age 34) Ermua, Spain

Cycling career
- Sport: Cycling
- Current team: Retired
- Discipline: Road
- Role: Rider

Amateur teams
- 2012: Debabarrena
- 2013–2014: Café Baqué–Conservas Campos
- 2015: Ampo–Goierriko TB
- 2016–2017: Ampo–Goierriko TB

Professional teams
- 2016: Team Manzana Postobón
- 2018–2023: Fundación Euskadi

Peio Goikoetxea Goiogana (born 14 February 1992) is a Spanish former cyclist, who competed as a professional in 2016 and again from 2018 to 2023. He won stage 4 of the Volta a Portugal do Futuro in 2014.

== Major results ==
2014
1st Stage 4 Volta a Portugal do Futuro
2022
1st Aggressive rider classification, Tour of Oman
