= 2022 Tour de Wallonie =

2022 UCI ProSeries
- Event poster with previous winner Quinn Simmons

Race details
- Dates: 23–27 July 2022
- Stages: 5
- Distance: 962.4 km (598.0 mi)
- Winning time: 22h 49' 54"

Results
Jersey awarded to the overall winner	Winner	Robert Stannard (AUS)	(Alpecin–Deceuninck)
	Second	Loïc Vliegen (BEL)	(Intermarché–Wanty–Gobert Matériaux)
	Third	Mattias Skjelmose (DEN)	(Trek–Segafredo)
Jersey awarded to the points classification winner	Points	Robert Stannard (AUS)	(Alpecin–Deceuninck)
Jersey awarded to the mountains classification winner	Mountains	Victor Campenaerts (BEL)	(Lotto–Soudal)
Jersey awarded to the youth classification winner	Youth	Robert Stannard (AUS)	(Alpecin–Deceuninck)
Jersey awarded to the sprints classification winner	Sprints	Dries Van Gestel (BEL)	(Team TotalEnergies)
	Team	Lotto–Soudal	

The 2022 Tour de Wallonie (known as the Ethias–Tour de Wallonie for sponsorship reasons) was a five-stage men's professional road cycling race mainly held in the Belgian region of Wallonia. It was a 2.Pro race as part of the 2022 UCI ProSeries calendar. It was the 49th edition of the Tour de Wallonie, which started on 23 July and finished on 27 July.

== Teams ==
Fourteen of the eighteen UCI WorldTeams, six UCI ProTeams, and two UCI Continental teams made up the twenty-two teams that participated in the race.

UCI WorldTeams

- AG2R Citroën Team
- Bora–Hansgrohe
- Cofidis
- EF Education–EasyPost
- Groupama–FDJ
- Ineos Grenadiers
- Intermarché–Wanty–Gobert Matériaux
- Israel–Premier Tech
- Lotto–Soudal
- Movistar Team
- Quick-Step Alpha Vinyl Team
- Team DSM
- Trek–Segafredo
- UAE Team Emirates

UCI ProTeams

- Alpecin–Deceuninck
- Arkéa–Samsic
- Bingoal Pauwels Sauces WB
- B&B Hotels–KTM
- Sport Vlaanderen–Baloise
- Team TotalEnergies

UCI Continental Teams

- Baloise–Trek Lions
- Tarteletto–Isorex

== Route ==
Stage characteristics and winners
Stage	Date	Route	Distance	Type	Winner
1	23 July	Temploux to Huy	174.4 km (108.4 mi)	Hilly stage	Julian Alaphilippe (FRA)
2	24 July	Verviers to Herve	176.8 km (109.9 mi)	Hilly stage	Oier Lazkano (ESP)
3	25 July	Visé to Rochefort	195.6 km (121.5 mi)	Hilly stage	Arnaud De Lie (BEL)
4	26 July	Durbuy to Couvin	200.8 km (124.8 mi)	Hilly stage	Davide Ballerini (ITA)
5	27 July	Le Roeulx to Chapelle-lez-Herlaimont	214.8 km (133.5 mi)	Hilly stage	Jan Bakelants (BEL)
Total			938.7 km (583.3 mi)		

== Stages ==
=== Stage 1 ===
23 July 2022 — Temploux to Huy, 174.4 km (108.4 mi)

Stage 1 Result
Rank	Rider	Team	Time
1	Julian Alaphilippe (FRA)	Quick-Step Alpha Vinyl Team	4h 06' 11"
2	Alex Aranburu (ESP)	Movistar Team	+ 1"
3	Robert Stannard (AUS)	Alpecin–Deceuninck	+ 1"
4	Mattias Skjelmose Jensen (DEN)	Trek–Segafredo	+ 5"
5	Odd Christian Eiking (NOR)	EF Education–EasyPost	+ 5"
6	Lorenzo Rota (ITA)	Intermarché–Wanty–Gobert Matériaux	+ 5"
7	Guillaume Martin (FRA)	Cofidis	+ 9"
8	Greg Van Avermaet (BEL)	AG2R Citroën Team	+ 15"
9	Clément Champoussin (FRA)	AG2R Citroën Team	+ 15"
10	Cian Uijtdebroeks (BEL)	Cofidis	+ 17"

General classification after Stage 1
Rank	Rider	Team	Time
1	Julian Alaphilippe (FRA)	Quick-Step Alpha Vinyl Team	4h 06' 01"
2	Alex Aranburu (ESP)	Movistar Team	+ 5"
3	Robert Stannard (AUS)	Alpecin–Deceuninck	+ 7"
4	Mattias Skjelmose Jensen (DEN)	Trek–Segafredo	+ 15"
5	Odd Christian Eiking (NOR)	EF Education–EasyPost	+ 15"
6	Lorenzo Rota (ITA)	Intermarché–Wanty–Gobert Matériaux	+ 15"
7	Guillaume Martin (FRA)	Cofidis	+ 19"
8	Greg Van Avermaet (BEL)	AG2R Citroën Team	+ 25"
9	Clément Champoussin (FRA)	AG2R Citroën Team	+ 25"
10	Cian Uijtdebroeks (BEL)	Cofidis	+ 27"

=== Stage 2 ===
24 July 2022 — Verviers to Herve, 176.8 km (109.9 mi)

Stage 2 Result
Rank	Rider	Team	Time
1	Oier Lazkano (ESP)	Movistar Team	4h 12' 40"
2	Loïc Vliegen (BEL)	Intermarché–Wanty–Gobert Matériaux	+ 2"
3	Jesús Herrada (ESP)	Cofidis	+ 7"
4	Robert Stannard (AUS)	Alpecin–Deceuninck	+ 11"
5	Mattias Skjelmose Jensen (DEN)	Trek–Segafredo	+ 11"
6	Lorenzo Rota (ITA)	Intermarché–Wanty–Gobert Matériaux	+ 11"
7	Greg Van Avermaet (BEL)	AG2R Citroën Team	+ 11"
8	James Shaw (GBR)	EF Education–EasyPost	+ 11"
9	Maxim Van Gils (BEL)	Lotto–Soudal	+ 11"
10	Frederik Wandahl (DEN)	Bora–Hansgrohe	+ 11"

General classification after Stage 2
Rank	Rider	Team	Time
1	Robert Stannard (AUS)	Alpecin–Deceuninck	8h 18' 57"
2	Mattias Skjelmose Jensen (DEN)	Trek–Segafredo	+ 7"
3	Lorenzo Rota (ITA)	Intermarché–Wanty–Gobert Matériaux	+ 10"
4	Loïc Vliegen (BEL)	Intermarché–Wanty–Gobert Matériaux	+ 11"
5	Guillaume Martin (FRA)	Cofidis	+ 11"
6	Greg Van Avermaet (BEL)	AG2R Citroën Team	+ 20"
7	Cian Uijtdebroeks (BEL)	Cofidis	+ 22"
8	James Shaw (GBR)	EF Education–EasyPost	+ 28"
9	Jesús Herrada (ESP)	Cofidis	+ 29"
10	Maxim Van Gils (BEL)	Lotto–Soudal	+ 32"

=== Stage 3 ===
25 July 2022 — Visé to Rochefort, 195.6 km (121.5 mi)

Stage 3 Result
Rank	Rider	Team	Time
1	Arnaud De Lie (BEL)	Lotto–Soudal	4h 39' 22"
2	Biniam Girmay (ERI)	Intermarché–Wanty–Gobert Matériaux	+ 0"
3	Axel Laurance (FRA)	B&B Hotels–KTM	+ 0"
4	Tom Van Asbroeck (BEL)	Israel–Premier Tech	+ 0"
5	Matteo Moschetti (ITA)	Trek–Segafredo	+ 0"
6	Alex Aranburu (ESP)	Movistar Team	+ 0"
7	Milan Menten (BEL)	Bingoal Pauwels Sauces WB	+ 0"
8	Oliviero Troia (ITA)	UAE Team Emirates	+ 0"
9	Ben Turner (GBR)	Ineos Grenadiers	+ 0"
10	Kim Heiduk (GER)	Ineos Grenadiers	+ 0"

General classification after Stage 3
Rank	Rider	Team	Time
1	Robert Stannard (AUS)	Alpecin–Deceuninck	12h 58' 23"
2	Loïc Vliegen (BEL)	Intermarché–Wanty–Gobert Matériaux	+ 4"
3	Mattias Skjelmose Jensen (DEN)	Trek–Segafredo	+ 6"
4	Lorenzo Rota (ITA)	Intermarché–Wanty–Gobert Matériaux	+ 8"
5	Guillaume Martin (FRA)	Cofidis	+ 11"
6	Greg Van Avermaet (BEL)	AG2R Citroën Team	+ 20"
7	Cian Uijtdebroeks (BEL)	Cofidis	+ 22"
8	James Shaw (GBR)	EF Education–EasyPost	+ 28"
9	Jesús Herrada (ESP)	Cofidis	+ 29"
10	Maxim Van Gils (BEL)	Lotto–Soudal	+ 32"

=== Stage 4 ===
26 July 2022 — Durbuy to Couvin, 200.8 km (124.8 mi)

Stage 4 Result
Rank	Rider	Team	Time
1	Davide Ballerini (ITA)	Quick-Step Alpha Vinyl Team	5h 10' 12"
2	José Joaquín Rojas (ESP)	Movistar Team	+ 0"
3	Rui Oliveira (POR)	UAE Team Emirates	+ 0"
4	Mattias Skjelmose Jensen (DEN)	Trek–Segafredo	+ 0"
5	Biniam Girmay (ERI)	Intermarché–Wanty–Gobert Matériaux	+ 0"
6	Matteo Trentin (ITA)	UAE Team Emirates	+ 0"
7	Jake Stewart (GBR)	Groupama–FDJ	+ 0"
8	Milan Menten (BEL)	Bingoal Pauwels Sauces WB	+ 0"
9	Axel Laurance (FRA)	B&B Hotels–KTM	+ 0"
10	Sep Vanmarcke (BEL)	Israel–Premier Tech	+ 0"

General classification after Stage 4
Rank	Rider	Team	Time
1	Robert Stannard (AUS)	Alpecin–Deceuninck	18h 08' 35"
2	Loïc Vliegen (BEL)	Intermarché–Wanty–Gobert Matériaux	+ 4"
3	Mattias Skjelmose Jensen (DEN)	Trek–Segafredo	+ 6"
4	Lorenzo Rota (ITA)	Intermarché–Wanty–Gobert Matériaux	+ 8"
5	Guillaume Martin (FRA)	Cofidis	+ 11"
6	Greg Van Avermaet (BEL)	AG2R Citroën Team	+ 20"
7	Cian Uijtdebroeks (BEL)	Cofidis	+ 22"
8	James Shaw (GBR)	EF Education–EasyPost	+ 28"
9	Jesús Herrada (ESP)	Cofidis	+ 29"
10	Maxim Van Gils (BEL)	Lotto–Soudal	+ 32"

=== Stage 5 ===
27 July 2022 — Le Roeulx to Chapelle-lez-Herlaimont, 214.8 km (133.5 mi)

Stage 5 Result
Rank	Rider	Team	Time
1	Jan Bakelants (BEL)	Intermarché–Wanty–Gobert Matériaux	4h 41' 25"
2	Robert Stannard (AUS)	Alpecin–Deceuninck	+ 0"
3	Axel Laurance (FRA)	B&B Hotels–KTM	+ 0"
4	Thibau Nys (BEL)	Baloise–Trek Lions	+ 0"
5	Matteo Trentin (ITA)	UAE Team Emirates	+ 0"
6	Dimitri Peyskens (BEL)	Bingoal Pauwels Sauces WB	+ 0"
7	Loïc Vliegen (BEL)	Intermarché–Wanty–Gobert Matériaux	+ 0"
8	Mattias Skjelmose Jensen (DEN)	Trek–Segafredo	+ 0"
9	Marijn van den Berg (NED)	EF Education–EasyPost	+ 0"
10	Filippo Baroncini (ITA)	Trek–Segafredo	+ 0"

General classification after Stage 5
Rank	Rider	Team	Time
1	Robert Stannard (AUS)	Alpecin–Deceuninck	22h 49' 54"
2	Loïc Vliegen (BEL)	Intermarché–Wanty–Gobert Matériaux	+ 10"
3	Mattias Skjelmose Jensen (DEN)	Trek–Segafredo	+ 12"
4	Lorenzo Rota (ITA)	Intermarché–Wanty–Gobert Matériaux	+ 14"
5	Greg Van Avermaet (BEL)	AG2R Citroën Team	+ 26"
6	Maxim Van Gils (BEL)	Lotto–Soudal	+ 38"
7	Frederik Wandahl (DEN)	Bora–Hansgrohe	+ 43"
8	Omer Goldstein (ISR)	Israel–Premier Tech	+ 46"
9	Guillaume Martin (FRA)	Cofidis	+ 51"
10	Oier Lazkano (ESP)	Movistar Team	+ 55"

== Classification leadership table ==
Classification leadership by stage
Stage	Winner	General classification	Points classification	Mountains classification	Sprints classification	Young rider classification	Team classification	Combativity award
1	Julian Alaphilippe	Julian Alaphilippe	Julian Alaphilippe	Lennert Teugels	Fabien Lienhard	Robert Stannard	Intermarché–Wanty–Gobert Matériaux	
2	Oier Lazkano	Robert Stannard	Oier Lazkano	Gianni Vermeersch	Fabien Lienhard	Robert Stannard	Lotto–Soudal	
3	Arnaud De Lie	Robert Stannard	Alex Aranburu	Victor Campenaerts	Casper Pedersen	Robert Stannard	Lotto–Soudal	
4	Davide Ballerini	Robert Stannard	Mattias Skjelmose Jensen	Victor Campenaerts	Casper Pedersen	Robert Stannard	Lotto–Soudal	
5	Jan Bakelants	Robert Stannard	Robert Stannard	Victor Campenaerts	Dries van Gestel	Robert Stannard	Lotto–Soudal	
Final		Robert Stannard	Robert Stannard	Victor Campenaerts	Dries van Gestel	Robert Stannard	Lotto–Soudal	

== Classification standings ==
Legend
Denotes the winner of the general classification	Denotes the winner of the sprints classification
Denotes the winner of the points classification	Denotes the winner of the young rider classification
Denotes the winner of the mountains classification	

=== General classification ===
Final general classification (1–10)
Rank	Rider	Team	Time
1	Robert Stannard (AUS)	Alpecin–Deceuninck	22h 49' 54"
2	Loïc Vliegen (BEL)	Intermarché–Wanty–Gobert Matériaux	+ 10"
3	Mattias Skjelmose Jensen (DEN)	Trek–Segafredo	+ 12"
4	Lorenzo Rota (ITA)	Intermarché–Wanty–Gobert Matériaux	+ 14"
5	Greg Van Avermaet (BEL)	AG2R Citroën Team	+ 26"
6	Maxim Van Gils (BEL)	Lotto–Soudal	+ 38"
7	Frederik Wandahl (DEN)	Bora–Hansgrohe	+ 43"
8	Omer Goldstein (ISR)	Israel–Premier Tech	+ 46"
9	Guillaume Martin (FRA)	Cofidis	+ 51"
10	Oier Lazkano (ESP)	Movistar Team	+ 55"

=== Points classification ===
Final points classification (1–10)
Rank	Rider	Team	Points
1	Robert Stannard (AUS)	Alpecin–Deceuninck	45
2	Axel Laurance (FRA)	B&B Hotels–KTM	32
3	Mattias Skjelmose Jensen (DEN)	Trek–Segafredo	31
4	Alex Aranburu (ESP)	Movistar Team	26
5	Oier Lazkano (ESP)	Movistar Team	25
6	Davide Ballerini (ITA)	Quick-Step Alpha Vinyl Team	25
7	Loïc Vliegen (BEL)	Intermarché–Wanty–Gobert Matériaux	24
8	Jan Bakelants (BEL)	Intermarché–Wanty–Gobert Matériaux	20
9	José Joaquín Rojas (ESP)	Movistar Team	20
10	Jesús Herrada (ESP)	Cofidis	15

=== Mountains classification ===
Final mountains classification (1–10)
Rank	Rider	Team	Points
1	Victor Campenaerts (BEL)	Lotto–Soudal	50
2	Oier Lazkano (ESP)	Movistar Team	30
3	Lennert Teugels (BEL)	Tarteletto–Isorex	28
4	Rui Oliveira (POR)	UAE Team Emirates	28
5	Ivo Oliveira (POR)	UAE Team Emirates	26
6	José Joaquín Rojas (ESP)	Movistar Team	22
7	Thijs Aerts (BEL)	Baloise–Trek Lions	20
8	Davide Ballerini (ITA)	Quick-Step Alpha Vinyl Team	20
9	Edward Theuns (BEL)	Trek–Segafredo	14
10	Maxime Chevalier (FRA)	B&B Hotels–KTM	14

=== Sprints classification ===
Final sprints classification (1–10)
Rank	Rider	Team	Points
1	Dries van Gestel (BEL)	Team TotalEnergies	15
2	Kenneth Vanbilsen (BEL)	Cofidis	11
3	Fabian Lienhard (SUI)	Groupama–FDJ	10
4	Davide Ballerini (ITA)	Quick-Step Alpha Vinyl Team	9
5	Thijs Aerts (BEL)	Baloise–Trek Lions	7
6	Loïc Vliegen (BEL)	Intermarché–Wanty–Gobert Matériaux	5
7	Guillaume Martin (FRA)	Cofidis	5
8	Victor Campenaerts (BEL)	Lotto–Soudal	5
9	Rui Oliveira (POR)	UAE Team Emirates	5
10	Mattias Skjelmose Jensen (DEN)	Trek–Segafredo	5

=== Young rider classification ===
Final young rider classification (1–10)
Rank	Rider	Team	Points
1	Robert Stannard (AUS)	Alpecin–Deceuninck	22h 49' 54"
2	Mattias Skjelmose Jensen (DEN)	Trek–Segafredo	+ 12"
3	Maxim Van Gils (BEL)	Lotto–Soudal	+ 38"
4	Frederik Wandahl (DEN)	Bora–Hansgrohe	+ 43"
5	Oier Lazkano (ESP)	Movistar Team	+ 55"
6	Filippo Baroncini (ITA)	Trek–Segafredo	+ 1' 41"
7	Ben Healy (IRL)	EF Education–EasyPost	+ 3' 03"
8	Pim Ronhaar (NED)	Baloise–Trek Lions	+ 10' 40"
9	Kévin Vauquelin (FRA)	Arkéa–Samsic	+ 11' 42"
10	Ben Turner (GBR)	Ineos Grenadiers	+ 12' 11"

=== Team classification ===
Final team classification (1–10)
Rank	Team	Time
1	Lotto–Soudal	68h 34' 36"
2	Intermarché–Wanty–Gobert Matériaux	+ 4' 28"
3	Bora–Hansgrohe	+ 6' 30"
4	EF Education–EasyPost	+ 7' 15"
5	Trek–Segafredo	+ 7' 58"
6	Cofidis	+ 9' 10"
7	Israel–Premier Tech	+ 10' 22"
8	AG2R Citroën Team	+ 14' 17"
9	Movistar Team	+ 15' 18"
10	Alpecin–Deceuninck	+ 23' 54"
