= 2023 Boucles de la Mayenne =

French cycling race

2023 UCI ProSeries

Race details
- Dates: 25–28 May 2023
- Stages: 3 + Prologue
- Distance: 537.6 km (334.0 mi)

Results
Jersey awarded to the overall winner	Winner	Oier Lazkano (ESP)	(Movistar Team)
	Second	Arnaud Démare (FRA)	(Groupama–FDJ)
	Third	Axel Zingle (FRA)	(Cofidis)
Jersey awarded to the points classification winner	Points	Arnaud Démare (FRA)	(Groupama–FDJ)
Jersey awarded to the mountains classification winner	Mountains	Jacob Hindsgaul Madsen (DEN)	(Uno-X Pro Cycling Team)
Jersey awarded to the youth classification winner	Youth	Oier Lazkano (ESP)	(Movistar Team)
	Team	(Spain) Movistar Team	

The 2023 Boucles de la Mayenne (transl. Loops of the Mayenne) was a road cycling stage race that took place between 25 and 28 May 2023 in the Mayenne department in northwestern France. The race was rated as a category 2.Pro event on the 2023 UCI ProSeries calendar, and was the 48th edition of the Boucles de la Mayenne.

== Teams ==
6 of the 18 UCI WorldTeams, eleven UCI ProTeams and four UCI Continental teams made up the 21 teams that participated in the race.

UCI WorldTeams

- AG2R Citroën Team
- Arkéa–Samsic
- Cofidis
- Groupama–FDJ
- Movistar Team
- UAE Team Emirates

UCI ProTeams

- Bingoal WB
- Burgos BH
- Caja Rural–Seguros RGA
- Equipo Kern Pharma
- Human Powered Health
- Lotto–Dstny
- Q36.5 Pro Cycling Team
- Team Flanders–Baloise
- Team TotalEnergies
- Tudor Pro Cycling Team
- Uno-X Pro Cycling Team

UCI Continental Teams

- CIC U Nantes Atlantique
- Nice Métropole Côte d'Azur
- St. Michel–Mavic–Auber93
- Van Rysel–Roubaix–Lille Métropole

== Route ==
Stage characteristics and winners
Stage	Date	Course	Distance	Type	Stage winner
P	25 May	Laval (Espace Mayenne)	4.1 km (2.5 mi)	Individual time trial	Ivo Oliveira (POR)
1	26 May	Saint-Mars-sur-Colmont to Lassay-les-Châteaux	185.2 km (115.1 mi)	Hilly stage	Oier Lazkano (ESP)
2	27 May	Saint-Berthevin to Meslay-du-Maine	181.3 km (112.7 mi)	Flat stage	Arnaud Démare (FRA)
3	28 May	Montsûrs to Laval	167 km (104 mi)	Hilly stage	Arvid de Kleijn (NED)
Total			537.6 km (334.0 mi)		

== Stages ==
=== Prologue ===
25 May 2023 – Laval (Espace Mayenne), 4.1 km (2.5 mi)

Prologue Result
Rank	Rider	Team	Time
1	Ivo Oliveira (POR)	UAE Team Emirates	5' 17"
2	Axel Zingle (FRA)	Cofidis	+ 2"
3	Benoît Cosnefroy (FRA)	AG2R Citroën Team	+ 3"
4	Mathias Norsgaard (DEN)	Movistar Team	+ 4"
5	Maikel Zijlaard (NED)	Tudor Pro Cycling Team	+ 6"
6	Arnaud Démare (FRA)	Groupama–FDJ	+ 6"
7	Lorenzo Germani (ITA)	Groupama–FDJ	+ 6"
8	Tom Bohli (SUI)	Tudor Pro Cycling Team	+ 7"
9	Ewen Costiou (FRA)	Arkéa–Samsic	+ 7"
10	Dries Van Gestel (BEL)	Team TotalEnergies	+ 7"

General classification after Prologue
Rank	Rider	Team	Time
1	Ivo Oliveira (POR)	UAE Team Emirates	5' 17"
2	Axel Zingle (FRA)	Cofidis	+ 2"
3	Benoît Cosnefroy (FRA)	AG2R Citroën Team	+ 3"
4	Mathias Norsgaard (DEN)	Movistar Team	+ 4"
5	Maikel Zijlaard (NED)	Tudor Pro Cycling Team	+ 6"
6	Arnaud Démare (FRA)	Groupama–FDJ	+ 6"
7	Lorenzo Germani (ITA)	Groupama–FDJ	+ 6"
8	Tom Bohli (SUI)	Tudor Pro Cycling Team	+ 7"
9	Ewen Costiou (FRA)	Arkéa–Samsic	+ 7"
10	Dries Van Gestel (BEL)	Team TotalEnergies	+ 7"

=== Stage 1 ===
26 May 2023 – Saint-Mars-sur-Colmont to Lassay-les-Châteaux, 185.2 km (115.1 mi)

Stage 1 Result
Rank	Rider	Team	Time
1	Oier Lazkano (ESP)	Movistar Team	4h 29' 07"
2	Célestin Guillon (FRA)	Van Rysel–Roubaix–Lille Métropole	+ 31"
3	Jacob Hindsgaul Madsen (DEN)	Uno-X Pro Cycling Team	+ 32"
4	Arnaud Démare (FRA)	Groupama–FDJ	+ 41"
5	Sandy Dujardin (FRA)	Team TotalEnergies	+ 41"
6	Axel Zingle (FRA)	Cofidis	+ 41"
7	Milan Menten (BEL)	Lotto–Dstny	+ 41"
8	Clément Venturini (FRA)	AG2R Citroën Team	+ 41"
9	Jon Barrenetxea (ESP)	Caja Rural–Seguros RGA	+ 41"
10	Manuel Peñalver (ESP)	Burgos BH	+ 41"

General classification after Stage 1
Rank	Rider	Team	Time
1	Oier Lazkano (ESP)	Movistar Team	4h 34' 23"
2	Ivo Oliveira (POR)	UAE Team Emirates	+ 42"
3	Jacob Hindsgaul Madsen (DEN)	Uno-X Pro Cycling Team	+ 44"
4	Axel Zingle (FRA)	Cofidis	+ 44"
5	Benoît Cosnefroy (FRA)	AG2R Citroën Team	+ 44"
6	Mathias Norsgaard (DEN)	Movistar Team	+ 46"
7	Célestin Guillon (FRA)	Van Rysel–Roubaix–Lille Métropole	+ 48"
8	Arnaud Démare (FRA)	Groupama–FDJ	+ 48"
9	Ewen Costiou (FRA)	Arkéa–Samsic	+ 49"
10	Dries Van Gestel (BEL)	Team TotalEnergies	+ 49"

=== Stage 2 ===
27 May 2023 – Saint-Berthevin to Meslay-du-Maine, 181.3 km (112.7 mi)

Stage 2 Result
Rank	Rider	Team	Time
1	Arnaud Démare (FRA)	Groupama–FDJ	4h 05' 42"
2	Milan Menten (BEL)	Lotto–Dstny	+ 0"
3	Arvid de Kleijn (NED)	Tudor Pro Cycling Team	+ 0"
4	Tord Gudmestad (NOR)	Uno-X Pro Cycling Team	+ 0"
5	Matteo Malucelli (ITA)	Bingoal WB	+ 0"
6	Jason Tesson (FRA)	Team TotalEnergies	+ 0"
7	Axel Zingle (FRA)	Cofidis	+ 0"
8	Dries Van Gestel (BEL)	Team TotalEnergies	+ 0"
9	Manuel Peñalver (ESP)	Burgos BH	+ 0"
10	Clément Venturini (FRA)	AG2R Citroën Team	+ 0"

General classification after Stage 2
Rank	Rider	Team	Time
1	Oier Lazkano (ESP)	Movistar Team	8h 40' 05"
2	Arnaud Démare (FRA)	Groupama–FDJ	+ 38"
3	Ivo Oliveira (POR)	UAE Team Emirates	+ 40"
4	Axel Zingle (FRA)	Cofidis	+ 41"
5	Milan Menten (BEL)	Lotto–Dstny	+ 43"
6	Jacob Hindsgaul Madsen (DEN)	Uno-X Pro Cycling Team	+ 43"
7	Sandy Dujardin (FRA)	Team TotalEnergies	+ 45"
8	Benoît Cosnefroy (FRA)	AG2R Citroën Team	+ 45"
9	Mathias Norsgaard (DEN)	Movistar Team	+ 46"
10	Célestin Guillon (FRA)	Van Rysel–Roubaix–Lille Métropole	+ 48"

=== Stage 3 ===
28 May 2023 – Montsûrs to Laval, 167 km (104 mi)

Stage 3 Result
Rank	Rider	Team	Time
1	Arvid de Kleijn (NED)	Tudor Pro Cycling Team	3h 55' 22"
2	Arnaud Démare (FRA)	Groupama–FDJ	+ 0"
3	Axel Zingle (FRA)	Cofidis	+ 0"
4	Stian Fredheim (NOR)	Uno-X Pro Cycling Team	+ 0"
5	Milan Menten (BEL)	Lotto–Dstny	+ 0"
6	Gonzalo Serrano (ESP)	Movistar Team	+ 0"
7	Nicolò Parisini (ITA)	Q36.5 Pro Cycling Team	+ 0"
8	Manuel Peñalver (ESP)	Burgos BH	+ 0"
9	Pierre Gautherat (FRA)	AG2R Citroën Team	+ 0"
10	Matteo Malucelli (ITA)	Bingoal WB	+ 0"

General classification after Stage 3
Rank	Rider	Team	Time
1	Oier Lazkano (ESP)	Movistar Team	12h 35' 30"
2	Arnaud Démare (FRA)	Groupama–FDJ	+ 29"
3	Axel Zingle (FRA)	Cofidis	+ 33"
4	Ivo Oliveira (POR)	UAE Team Emirates	+ 38"
5	Milan Menten (BEL)	Lotto–Dstny	+ 40"
6	Jacob Hindsgaul Madsen (DEN)	Uno-X Pro Cycling Team	+ 43"
7	Sandy Dujardin (FRA)	Team TotalEnergies	+ 45"
8	Benoît Cosnefroy (FRA)	AG2R Citroën Team	+ 45"
9	Mathias Norsgaard (DEN)	Movistar Team	+ 46"
10	Clément Venturini (FRA)	AG2R Citroën Team	+ 47"

== Classification leadership table ==
Classification leadership by stage
Stage	Winner	General classification	Points classification	Mountains classification	Young rider classification	Team classification
P	Ivo Oliveira	Ivo Oliveira	Ivo Oliveira	not awarded	Maikel Zijlaard	AG2R Citroën Team
1	Oier Lazkano	Oier Lazkano	Oier Lazkano	Jacob Hindsgaul Madsen	Oier Lazkano	Movistar Team
2	Arnaud Démare	Oier Lazkano	Arnaud Démare	Jacob Hindsgaul Madsen	Oier Lazkano	Movistar Team
3	Arvid de Kleijn	Oier Lazkano	Arnaud Démare	Jacob Hindsgaul Madsen	Oier Lazkano	Movistar Team
Final		Oier Lazkano	Arnaud Démare	Jacob Hindsgaul Madsen	Oier Lazkano	Movistar Team

== Classification standings ==
Legend
Denotes the winner of the general classification	Denotes the winner of the mountains classification
Denotes the winner of the points classification	Denotes the winner of the young rider classification

Final general classification (1–10)
Rank	Rider	Team	Time
1	Oier Lazkano (ESP)	Movistar Team	12h 35' 30"
2	Arnaud Démare (FRA)	Groupama–FDJ	+ 29"
3	Axel Zingle (FRA)	Cofidis	+ 33"
4	Ivo Oliveira (POR)	UAE Team Emirates	+ 38"
5	Milan Menten (BEL)	Lotto–Dstny	+ 40"
6	Jacob Hindsgaul Madsen (DEN)	Uno-X Pro Cycling Team	+ 43"
7	Sandy Dujardin (FRA)	Team TotalEnergies	+ 45"
8	Benoît Cosnefroy (FRA)	AG2R Citroën Team	+ 45"
9	Mathias Norsgaard (DEN)	Movistar Team	+ 46"
10	Clément Venturini (FRA)	AG2R Citroën Team	+ 47"

=== Points classification ===
Final points classification (1–10)
Rank	Rider	Team	Points
1	Arnaud Démare (FRA)	Groupama–FDJ	69
2	Axel Zingle (FRA)	Cofidis	62
3	Milan Menten (BEL)	Lotto–Dstny	48
4	Arvid de Kleijn (NED)	Tudor Pro Cycling Team	41
5	Oier Lazkano (ESP)	Movistar Team	37
6	Ivo Oliveira (POR)	UAE Team Emirates	29
7	Jacob Hindsgaul Madsen (DEN)	Uno-X Pro Cycling Team	28
8	Sandy Dujardin (FRA)	Team TotalEnergies	27
9	Célestin Guillon (FRA)	Van Rysel–Roubaix–Lille Métropole	24
10	Manuel Peñalver (ESP)	Burgos BH	21

=== Mountains classification ===
Final mountains classification (1–10)
Rank	Rider	Team	Points
1	Jacob Hindsgaul Madsen (DEN)	Uno-X Pro Cycling Team	45
2	Marco Tizza (ITA)	Bingoal WB	26
4	Célestin Guillon (FRA)	Van Rysel–Roubaix–Lille Métropole	15
5	Maximilien Juillard (FRA)	Van Rysel–Roubaix–Lille Métropole	9
6	Maël Guégan (FRA)	CIC U Nantes Atlantique	9
7	Oier Lazkano (ESP)	Movistar Team	8
8	Jon Barrenetxea (ESP)	Caja Rural–Seguros RGA	8
9	Ewen Costiou (FRA)	Arkéa–Samsic	6
10	Samuel Leroux (FRA)	Van Rysel–Roubaix–Lille Métropole	6

=== Young rider classification ===
Final young rider classification (1–10)
Rank	Rider	Team	Time
1	Oier Lazkano (ESP)	Movistar Team	12h 35' 30"
2	Jacob Hindsgaul Madsen (DEN)	Uno-X Pro Cycling Team	+ 43"
3	Ewen Costiou (FRA)	Arkéa–Samsic	+ 49"
4	Jon Barrenetxea (ESP)	Caja Rural–Seguros RGA	+ 49"
5	Nicolò Parisini (ITA)	Q36.5 Pro Cycling Team	+ 50"
6	Aaron Van Der Beken (BEL)	Bingoal WB	+ 56"
7	Laurence Pithie (NZL)	Groupama–FDJ	+ 56"
8	Thomas Gachignard (FRA)	St. Michel–Mavic–Auber93	+ 58"
9	Vinicius Rangel (BRA)	Movistar Team	+ 59"
10	Danny van der Tuuk (NED)	Equipo Kern Pharma	+ 1' 00"

=== Team classification ===
Final team classification (1–10)
Rank	Team	Time
1	(Spain) Movistar Team	37h 48' 26"
2	(France) Groupama–FDJ	+ 32"
3	(France) Team TotalEnergies	+ 34"
4	(France) Arkéa–Samsic	+ 39"
5	(France) Van Rysel–Roubaix–Lille Métropole	+ 43"
6	(Norway) Uno-X Pro Cycling Team	+ 45"
7	(Switzerland) Q36.5 Pro Cycling Team	+ 56"
8	(Belgium) Bingoal WB	+ 1' 01"
9	(Spain) Burgos BH	+ 1' 02"
10	(Spain) Equipo Kern Pharma	+ 1' 03"
