= Jan Bakelants =

Belgian racing cyclist

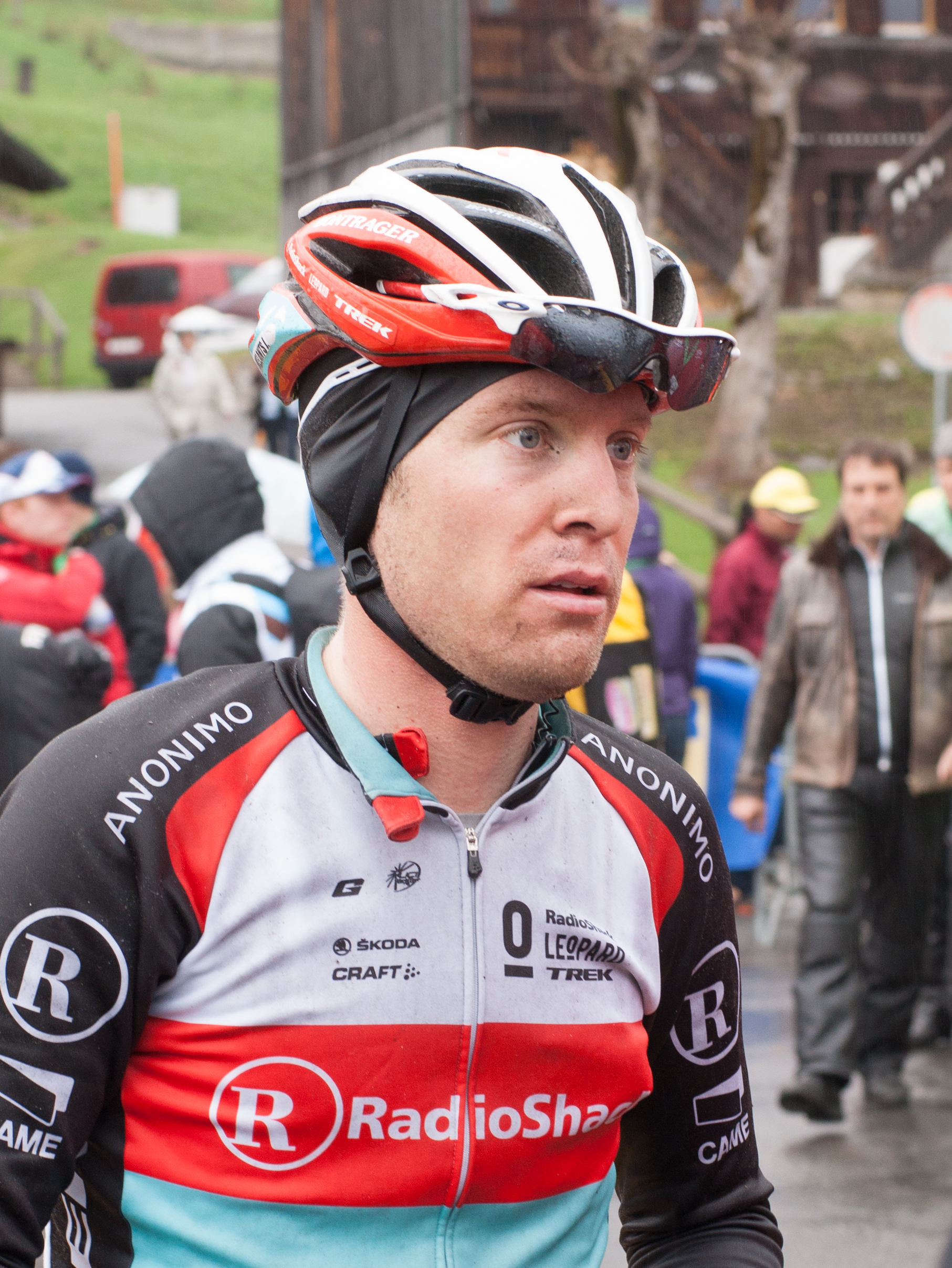
- Bakelants at the 2013 Tour de Romandie

Personal information
- Full name: Jan Bakelants
- Nickname: Baki
- Born: 14 February 1986 (age 40) Oudenaarde, Flanders, Belgium
- Height: 1.77 m (5 ft 10 in)
- Weight: 67 kg (148 lb; 10.6 st)

Cycling career
- Sport: Cycling
- Current team: Retired
- Discipline: Road
- Role: Rider
- Rider type: Puncheur

Amateur teams
- 2006–2008: Beveren 2000
- 2008: Topsport Vlaanderen (stagiaire)

Professional teams
- 2009: Topsport Vlaanderen–Mercator
- 2010–2011: Omega Pharma–Lotto
- 2012–2013: RadioShack–Nissan
- 2014: Omega Pharma–Quick-Step
- 2015–2018: AG2R La Mondiale
- 2019: Team Sunweb
- 2020–2022: Circus–Wanty Gobert

Major wins
- Grand Tours Tour de France 1 individual stage (2013) One-day races and Classics Gran Piemonte (2015) Giro dell'Emilia (2015)

Jan Bakelants (born 14 February 1986) is a Belgian former professional road racing cyclist, who competed as a professional from 2009 to 2022.

== Career ==
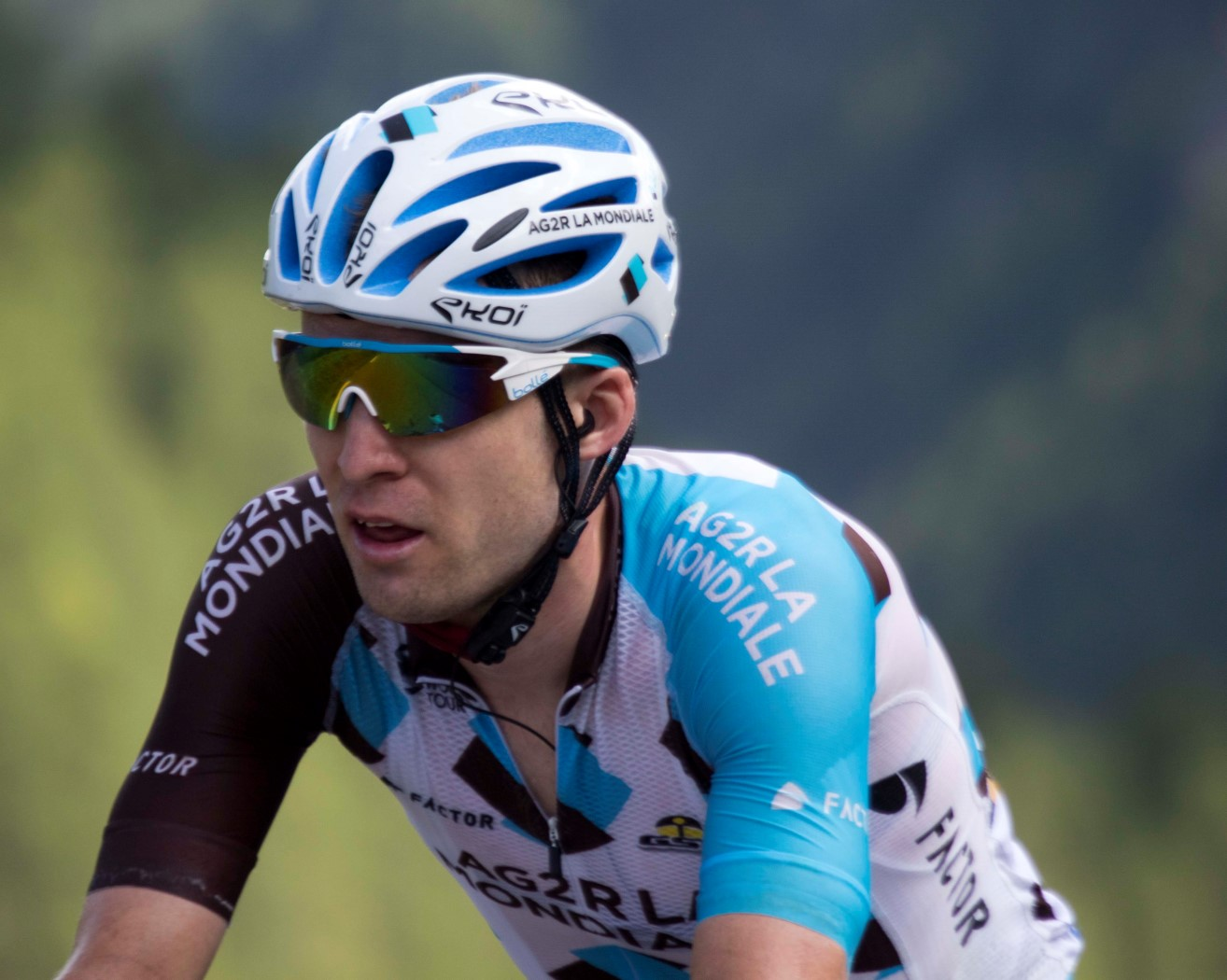
Bakelants at the 2017 Tour de France

His major wins include the 2008 Tour de l'Avenir and stage 2 of the 2013 Tour de France, claiming the yellow jersey after winning the stage by only a second of an advantage on the peloton after a late attack. He also rode the 2010 Giro d'Italia, in which he finished 36th.

Bakelants left RadioShack–Leopard at the end of the 2013 season, and joined Omega Pharma–Quick-Step for the 2014 season. In August 2014, it was announced that he would be leaving Omega Pharma–Quick-Step after one year and joining AG2R La Mondiale on an initial two-year deal.

Ahead of the 2017 Tour de France Bakelants faced criticism for remarks he made that were deemed sexist. In an interview with Het Laatste Nieuws he was asked if it was difficult to go without sex for three weeks during a grand tour. He jokingly answered that there were podium girls after all and he would make sure to pack condoms. This prompted Tour director Christian Prudhomme to demand a public apology, which Bakelants delivered on social media.

Bakelants was severely injured in a crash at the 2017 Giro di Lombardia when he crashed into a ravine on a fast descent, fracturing seven ribs and the first and third vertebrae. He did not lose consciousness and was transferred to the hospital in Como. The crash left Bakelants 1 centimetre (0.39 inches) shorter. After his crash, Bakelants spoke out about safety standards in cycling. He hoped to return to racing in March 2018, and did so at the Classic Loire Atlantique in France.

After one year with Team Sunweb in 2019 he spent the last three years of his professional career with Intermarché–Wanty–Gobert Matériaux, where he also won his last professional race with stage 5 of the 2022 Tour de Wallonie. Bakelants announced his retirement on 24 December 2022 after a non-amicable split from his last team. He felt the way he was treated by management, especially Aike Visbeek, didn't reflect the work he put in to help the team establish themselves on the World Tour.

Bakelants is married to Daphne Hofmans and they have two daughters and two sons.

== Major results ==
2006
10th Liège–Bastogne–Liège Espoirs
2007
3rd Paris–Tours Espoirs
2008
1st Overall Tour de l'Avenir

1st Stage 6

1st Overall Circuit des Ardennes
1st Overall Tour de Liège
1st Liège–Bastogne–Liège Espoirs
1st Flèche Ardennaise
2nd Overall Le Triptyque des Monts et Châteaux
2nd Grand Prix de Waregem
3rd Road race, National Under-23 Road Championships
4th Overall Tour des Pyrénées
4th Circuit de Wallonie
8th Overall Circuit Franco-Belge
9th Overall Giro delle Regioni
2009
2nd GP Triberg-Schwarzwald
5th De Vlaamse Pijl
7th Le Samyn
9th Overall Eneco Tour
10th Overall Tour of Belgium
10th Overall Ster Elektrotoer
2010
6th Overall Tour de Wallonie
7th Trofeo Inca
10th Clásica de Almería
2012
4th Road race, National Road Championships
5th Grand Prix de Wallonie
6th Overall Tour Down Under
6th Overall Circuit de la Sarthe
10th Overall Eneco Tour
2013
1st Grand Prix de Wallonie
Tour de France

1st Stage 2
Held after Stages 2 & 3

2nd Amstel Curaçao Race
National Road Championships

3rd Road race
4th Time trial

3rd Overall Tour de Luxembourg
4th Overall Eneco Tour
4th Grand Prix of Aargau Canton
7th Overall Tour of Beijing
10th Grand Prix Cycliste de Montréal
2014
1st Stage 6 Critérium du Dauphiné
3rd Grand Prix de Wallonie
7th La Drôme Classic
2015
1st Giro dell'Emilia
1st Gran Piemonte
2nd Grand Prix de Wallonie
4th Grand Prix Cycliste de Montréal
6th Overall Critérium International
7th Overall Circuit de la Sarthe
7th Coppa Sabatini
2016
2nd La Drôme Classic
3rd Overall La Méditerranéenne

1st Points classification
1st Stage 4

5th Giro dell'Emilia
6th Coppa Sabatini
8th Overall Tour La Provence
9th Classic Sud-Ardèche
2017
3rd La Drôme Classic
4th Grand Prix Cycliste de Montréal
5th Grand Prix de Wallonie
2018
6th Grand Prix Pino Cerami
2019
5th Overall ZLM Tour
2020
4th Road race, National Road Championships
6th Overall Tour de Luxembourg
9th Trofeo Matteotti
2022
1st Stage 5 Tour de Wallonie

=== Grand Tour results timeline ===
Grand Tour general classification results timeline
Grand Tour	2010	2011	2012	2013	2014	2015	2016	2017	2018	2019	2020	2021
Giro d'Italia	36	22	34	—	—	—	—	—	—	43	—	—
Tour de France	—	—	—	18	24	20	50	22	—	—	—	48
Vuelta a España	18	31	22	—	—	—	17	—	—	—	—	—
