= 2015 Gran Piemonte =

2015 UCI Europe Tour
- Altitude profile of the 2015 Gran Piemonte

Race details
- Dates: October 2
- Stages: 1
- Distance: 185 km (115.0 mi)

Results
	Winner	Jan Bakelants (BEL)	(AG2R La Mondiale)
	Second	Matteo Trentin (ITA)	(Etixx–Quick-Step)
	Third	Sonny Colbrelli (ITA)	(Bardiani–CSF)

The 2015 Gran Piemonte was the 99th edition of the Gran Piemonte (known as Giro del Piemonte until 2009) one-day cycling race. The race returned in 2015 after three years, because the 2013 and 2014 editions were not raced due to economical and organizational problems. It was held on 2 October, one day after the Milano–Torino and two days before Il Lombardia (the last "monument classic" of the season), as part of the Trittico di Autunno. It covered a distance of 185 kilometres (115 mi), starting in San Francesco al Campo and ending in Cirié. Riders with the characteristics of sprinter or puncheur were the favourites for the victory. The race was won by Jan Bakelants (AG2R La Mondiale), who attacked in the final 7 kilometres (4.3 mi) and held off the bunch to take a solo victory. Matteo Trentin (Etixx–Quick-Step) won the bunch sprint for second place ahead of Sonny Colbrelli (Bardiani–CSF).

== Teams ==
A total of 20 teams took part in the race, 12 World Tour teams and 8 Professional Continental teams.

UCI WorldTeams

- AG2R La Mondiale
- Astana
- Cannondale–Garmin
- Etixx–Quick-Step
- IAM Cycling
- Team Katusha
- Lampre–Merida
- LottoNL–Jumbo
- Movistar Team
- Team Sky
- Tinkoff–Saxo
- Trek Factory Racing

UCI Professional Continental teams

- Bardiani–CSF
- Bora–Argon 18
- Colombia
- MTN–Qhubeka
- Nippo–Vini Fantini
- Team Novo Nordisk
- Southeast Pro Cycling
- Androni Giocattoli–Sidermec

== Result ==
Result
Rank	Rider	Team	Time
1	Jan Bakelants (BEL)	AG2R La Mondiale	4hr 17' 53"
2	Matteo Trentin (ITA)	Etixx–Quick-Step	+ 4"
3	Sonny Colbrelli (ITA)	Bardiani–CSF	+ 4"
4	Eduard-Michael Grosu (ROM)	Nippo–Vini Fantini	+ 4"
5	José Joaquín Rojas (ESP)	Movistar Team	+ 4"
6	Sacha Modolo (ITA)	Lampre–Merida	+ 4"
7	Daniele Bennati (ITA)	Tinkoff–Saxo	+ 4"
8	Kristian Sbaragli (ITA)	MTN–Qhubeka	+ 4"
9	Andrea Fedi (ITA)	Southeast Pro Cycling	+ 4"
10	Alberto Bettiol (ITA)	Cannondale–Garmin	+ 4"
Source: ProCyclingStats
