= Lorenzo Rota =

Italian cyclist

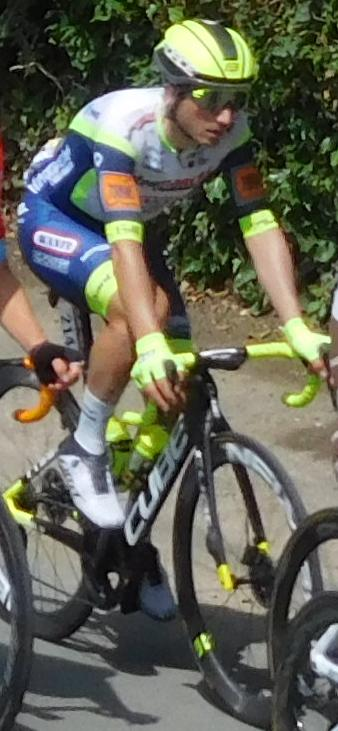
- Rota at the 2021 Tour de France

Personal information
- Born: 23 May 1995 (age 31) Bergamo, Italy
- Height: 1.72 m (5 ft 8 in)
- Weight: 63 kg (139 lb)

Cycling career
- Sport: Cycling
- Current team: Lotto–Intermarché
- Discipline: Road
- Role: Rider

Amateur teams
- 2009–2011: U.S. Paladina
- 2012–2013: Team Aurea

Professional teams
- 2014–2015: MG Kvis–Trevigiani
- 2016–2019: Bardiani–CSF
- 2020: Vini Zabù–KTM
- 2021–2025: Intermarché–Wanty–Gobert Matériaux
- 2026–: Lotto–Intermarché

Lorenzo Rota (born 23 May 1995) is an Italian racing cyclist, who rides for UCI WorldTeam Lotto–Intermarché.

== Career ==
He rode at the 2014 UCI Road World Championships, and was named in the start list for the 2017 Giro d'Italia.

In August 2020, it was announced that Rota would be joining the Intermarché–Wanty–Gobert Matériaux team on an initial one-year contract for the 2021 season. In his first season at World Tour level, Rota took seven top-ten finishes in one-day races, with a best finish of fourth place at the Clásica de San Sebastián and the Giro della Toscana. In October 2021, it was announced that Rota had extended his contract with the team for a further two years.

== Major results ==
2013
5th Road race, UCI Junior Road World Championships
2015
2nd Trofeo Alcide Degasperi
3rd Trofeo Internazionale Bastianelli
3rd Gran Premio di Poggiana
6th Gran Premio Industrie del Marmo
7th Overall Okolo Slovenska
8th GP Laguna
9th Coppa dei Laghi-Trofeo Almar
2017
5th Overall Tour du Limousin
2019
4th Coppa Agostoni
8th Overall Istrian Spring Trophy
10th Overall Tour of Slovenia
2020
5th Trofeo Laigueglia
6th Ardèche Classic
2021
4th Clásica de San Sebastián
4th Giro della Toscana
5th Coppa Sabatini
7th Tre Valli Varesine
7th Coppa Ugo Agostoni
7th Veneto Classic
10th Trofeo Laigueglia
2022 (2 pro wins)
1st Overall Sazka Tour

1st Points classification
1st Stage 2

2nd Road race, National Road Championships
2nd Giro della Toscana
2nd Polynormande
4th Overall Tour of Belgium
4th Overall Tour de Wallonie
4th Trofeo Laigueglia
4th Grand Prix of Aargau Canton
5th Overall Tour du Limousin
10th Clásica de San Sebastián
Combativity award Stage 12 Giro d'Italia
2023
2nd Road race, National Road Championships
3rd Trofeo Matteotti
4th Trofeo Laigueglia
5th Eschborn–Frankfurt
6th Circuit Franco-Belge
7th Ardèche Classic
7th Clásica Jaén Paraíso Interior
8th Overall Vuelta a Andalucía
8th Japan Cup
2024
2nd Road race, National Road Championships
7th Ardèche Classic
7th Giro del Veneto
8th Famenne Ardenne Classic
10th Trofeo Laigueglia
2025
10th Figueira Champions Classic
2026
8th Trofeo Serra Tramuntana

=== Grand Tour general classification results timeline ===
Grand Tour	2017	2018	2019	2020	2021	2022	2023	2024	2025	2026
Giro d'Italia	151	—	85	93	—	32	46	—	—	68
Tour de France	—	—	—	—	63	—	—	—	—	—
Vuelta a España	—	—	—	—	—	—	—	DNF	—	—

Legend
—	Did not compete
DNF	Did not finish
IP	In progress
