= Johan Meens =

Belgian cyclist

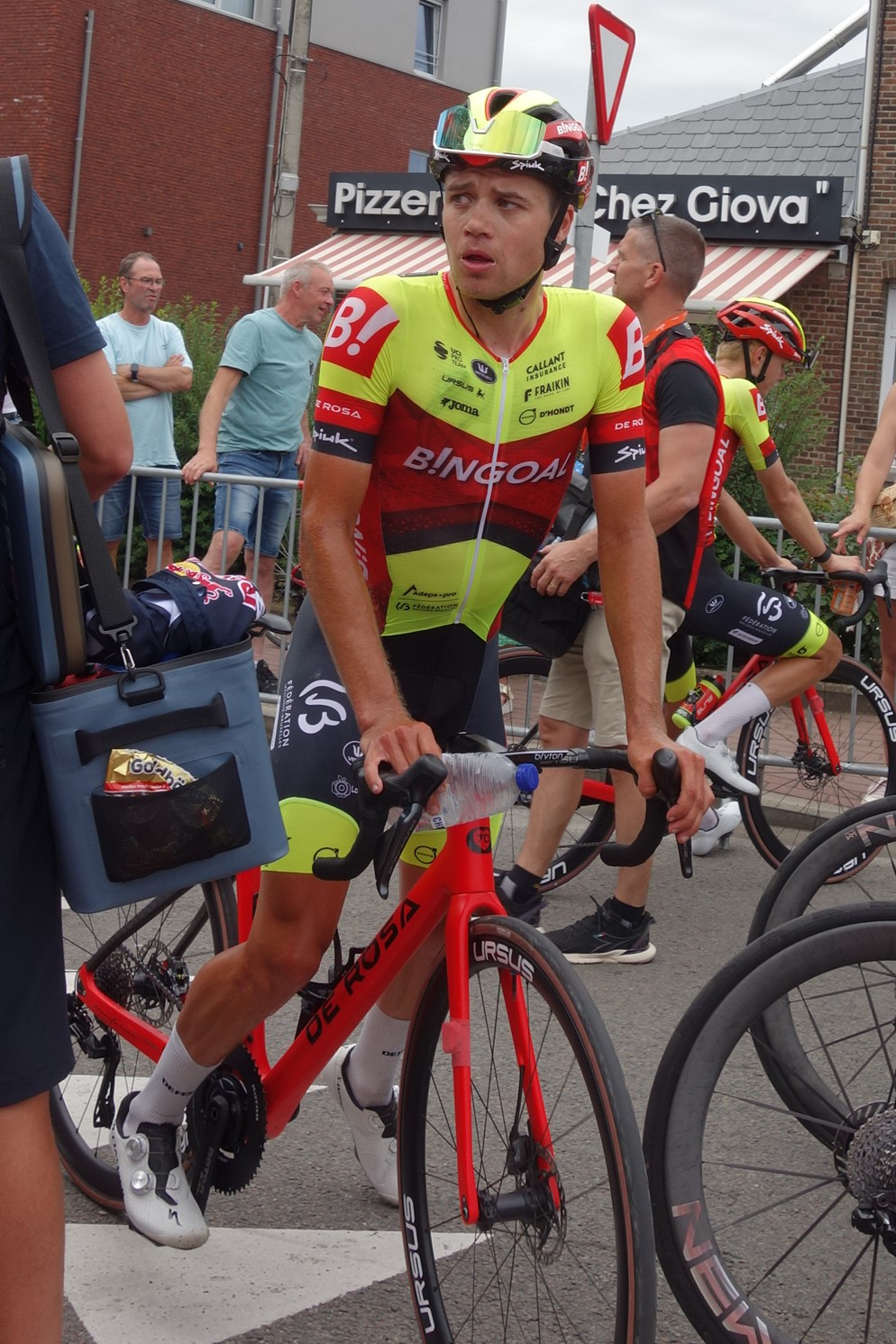
- Johan Meens in 2024

Personal information
- Born: 7 July 1999 (age 27) Hombourg, Belgium

Cycling career
- Sport: Cycling
- Current team: Wagner Bazin WB
- Discipline: Road
- Role: Rider

Amateur team
- 2018–2020: Pesant Club Liégeois

Professional teams
- 2021: Bingoal WB Development Team
- 2022–: Bingoal Pauwels Sauces WB

Johan Meens (born 7 July 1999) is a Belgian cyclist, who currently rides for UCI ProTeam Wagner Bazin WB.

== Major results ==
2023
1st Mountains classification, Tour de Wallonie
9th Overall Région Pays de la Loire Tour
2024
5th Volta NXT Classic
2025
10th Boucles de l'Aulne
