= Henri Vandenabeele =

Belgian cyclist

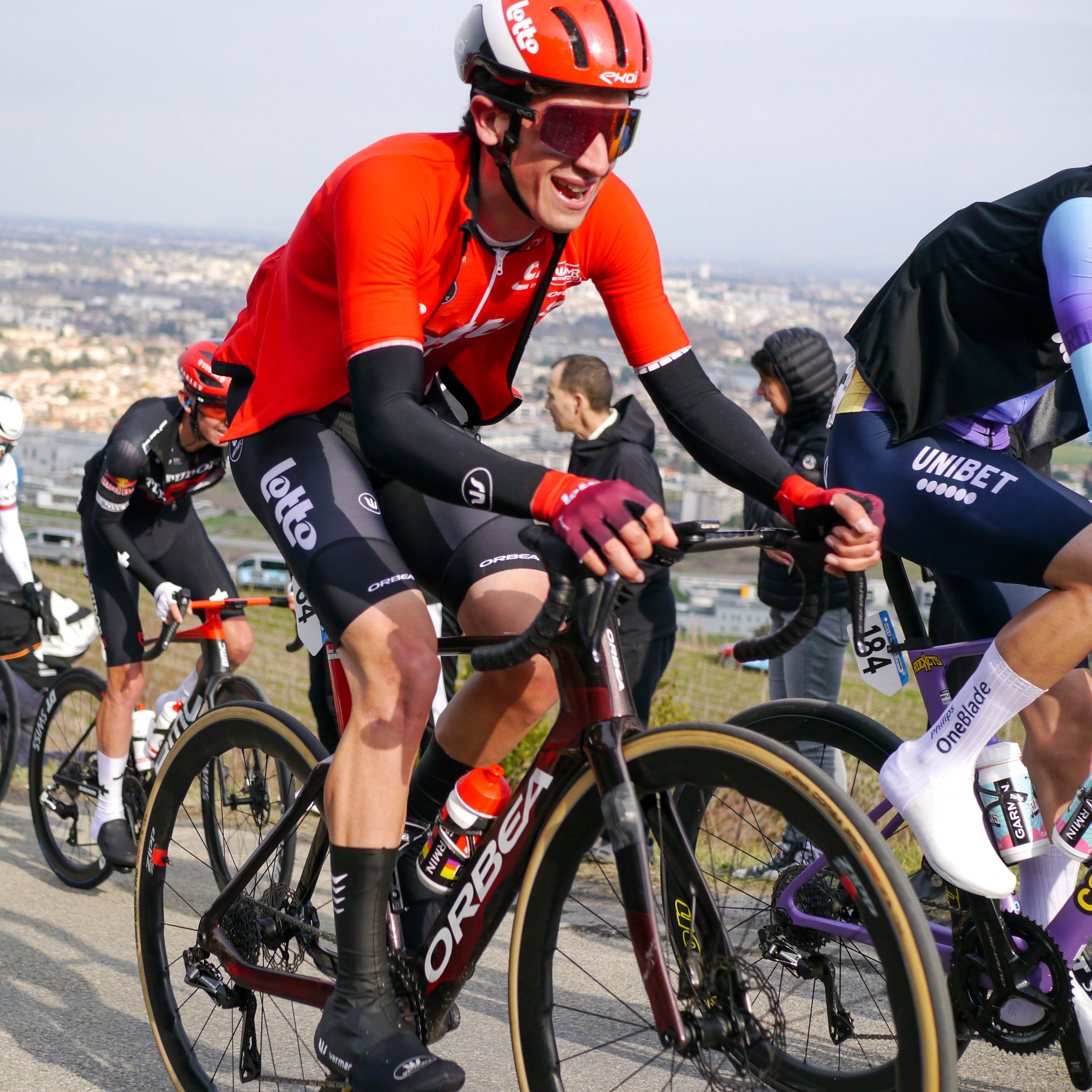
- Henri Vandenabeele at the summit of the Val d'Enfer

Personal information
- Born: 15 April 2000 (age 26) Deinze, Belgium
- Height: 1.81 m (5 ft 11 in)

Cycling career
- Sport: Cycling
- Current team: Team Flanders–Baloise
- Discipline: Road
- Role: Rider
- Rider type: Climber

Amateur teams
- 2017: Tieltse Rennersclub
- 2018: Crabbé Toitures–CC Chevigny Junior
- 2019–2020: Lotto–Soudal U23

Professional teams
- 2021: Development Team DSM
- 2022–2023: Team DSM
- 2024–2025: Lotto–Dstny
- 2026–: Team Flanders–Baloise

Henri Vandenabeele (born 15 April 2000) is a Belgian cyclist, who currently rides for UCI ProTeam Team Flanders–Baloise.

== Major results ==
2017
8th La Philippe Gilbert juniors
2018
2nd Overall Ain Bugey Valromey Tour
7th Bernaudeau Junior
9th La Route des Géants
2020
2nd Overall Ronde de l'Isard

1st Mountains classification
1st Points classification
1st Stage 2a

2nd Overall Giro Ciclistico d'Italia
10th Overall Giro della Friuli Venezia Giulia

1st Young rider classification

10th Il Piccolo Lombardia
2021
3rd Overall Giro Ciclistico d'Italia
2022
9th Overall Tour of Oman
10th Overall Tour of Turkey
2025
9th Trofeo Serra Tramuntana
2026
10th Overall Tour de Wallonie

=== Grand Tour general classification results timeline ===
Grand Tour	2022
Giro d'Italia	—
Tour de France	—
Vuelta a España	DNF

Legend
—	Did not compete
DNF	Did not finish
