= Robert Stannard (cyclist) =

Australian cyclist

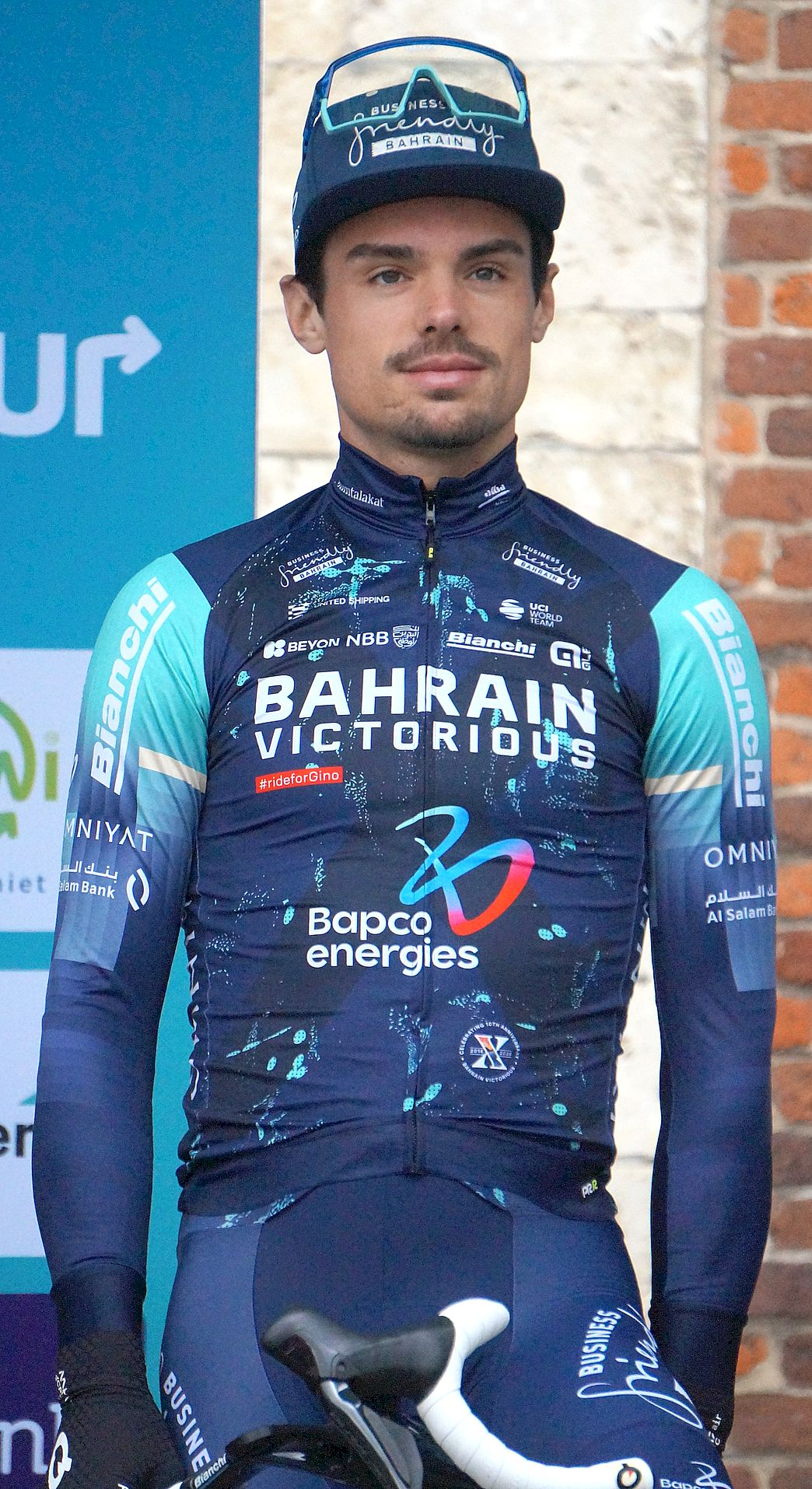
- Stannard in 2026

Personal information
- Born: 16 September 1998 (age 28) Sydney, Australia
- Height: 1.79 m (5 ft 10 in)
- Weight: 74 kg (163 lb)

Cycling career
- Sport: Cycling
- Current team: Team Bahrain Victorious
- Discipline: Road
- Role: Rider

Professional teams
- 2017–2018: Mitchelton Scott
- 2018–2021: Mitchelton–Scott
- 2022–2023: Alpecin–Fenix
- 2024–: Team Bahrain Victorious

Major wins
- Stage races Tour de Wallonie (2022)

Robert Stannard (born 16 September 1998) is an Australian cyclist, who rides for UCI WorldTeam Team Bahrain Victorious.

He was provisionally suspended by the UCI on 2 August 2023 for the "use of prohibited Methods and/or prohibited substances".

== Personal life ==
Stannard was born in Sydney but moved to New Zealand when he was four. He attended Palmerston North Boys' High School.

== Career ==
Although Stannard was born in Australia he first competed under the New Zealand flag until 2017 when he switched to an Australian license. He rode the Junior road race at the 2016 UCI Road World Championships where he placed 45.

His first race as an Australian was the Australian Under-23 National Time Trial Championships where he finished third.

Originally due to join the team in 2019, Stannard joined Mitchelton–Scott in October 2018 after his second season with Mitchelton–BikeExchange, and recorded a top-ten finish at the Japan Cup. In October 2020, he was named in the startlist for the 2020 Vuelta a España.

His first professional victory came in 2022 at the Tour de Wallonie where he won the overall, points and youth classifications.

== Suspension ==
On 3 August 2023 Stannard was provisionally suspended for a potential doping offense from 2018. He was due to race the road race at the 2023 UCI Road World Championships but could not compete due to his suspension.

== Major results ==
2015
Oceania Junior Road Championships

2nd Road race
3rd Time trial

New Zealand National Junior Road Championships

2nd Road race
3rd Time trial

2016
1st Stage 7 Tour of the Great South Coast
Oceania Junior Road Championships

2nd Road race
3rd Time trial

2nd Overall National Capital Tour
2017
1st Gravel and Tar Classic
1st Stage 3 Rhône-Alpes Isère Tour
2nd Time trial, Australian National Under-23 Road Championships
2nd Overall Toscana-Terra di Ciclismo

1st Stage 1 (TTT)

6th Overall Paris–Arras Tour
Oceania Under-23 Road Championships

7th Road race
7th Time trial

8th Overall Giro Ciclistico d'Italia
2018
1st Gran Premio di Poggiana
1st Giro del Belvedere
2nd Trofeo PIVA
3rd Overall Giro Ciclistico d'Italia

1st Stage 9b (ITT)

3rd Overall New Zealand Cycle Classic

1st Young rider classification

3rd Ronde van Vlaanderen Beloften
4th Flèche Ardennaise
4th Trofeo Città di San Vendemiano
9th Gravel and Tar
9th Overall Tour de Bretagne

1st Stage 7

=== Grand Tour general classification results timeline ===
Grand Tour	2020	2021	2022
Giro d'Italia	—	—	—
Tour de France	—	—	—
Vuelta a España	—	—	81

Legend
—	Did not compete
DNF	Did not finish
