= Denis Nekrasov (cyclist) =

Russian cyclist

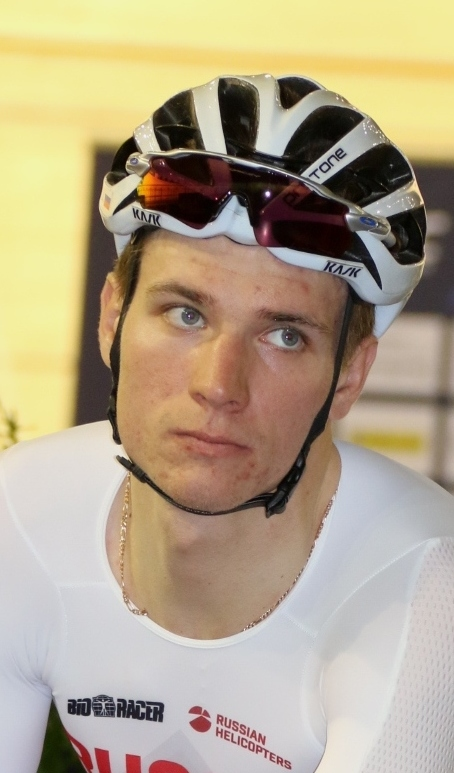
- Nekrasov in 2017

Personal information
- Full name: Denis Nekrasov
- Born: 19 February 1997 (age 29) Verkhnyaya Pyshma, Russia

Cycling career
- Sport: Cycling
- Disciplines: Track; Road
- Role: Rider

Amateur teams
- 2017–2018: Marathon–Tula
- 2018: Gazprom–RusVelo (stagiaire)
- 2022: Sverdlovsk Region

Professional team
- 2019–2022: Gazprom–RusVelo

Denis Nekrasov (Russian: Денис Некрасов; born 19 February 1997) is a Russian cyclist, who last rode for Russian amateur team Sverdlovsk Region.

== Major results ==
2015
3rd Scratch, UCI World Junior Track Championships
3rd Points race, UEC European Junior Track Championships
2017
1st Madison, National Track Championships (with Maksim Piskunov)
2018
8th Overall Tour of Cartier
2021
7th Classic Grand Besançon Doubs
