= 2023 in sports (C–J) =

This page describes and summarizes the year 2023 in world sporting events for sports starting with the letters "C" through "J".

== Canadian football ==
=== Canadian Football League ===
- May 2: 2023 CFL draft and 2023 CFL global draft
- June 8 – October 28: 2023 CFL season
- November 19: 110th Grey Cup in (Ontario) Hamilton
  - (Quebec) Montreal Alouettes defeat the (Manitoba) Winnipeg Blue Bombers, 28–24.

=== U Sports ===
- August 26 – November 18: 2023 U Sports football season
- November 25: 58th Vanier Cup in (Ontario) Kingston
  - (Quebec) Montreal Carabins defeat the (British Columbia) UBC Thunderbirds, 16–9.

== Canoeing ==
=== Canoe slalom ===
World & Continental Championships

- January 28–30: 2023 Oceania Canoe Slalom Championships in (New Zealand) Auckland
- April 28–30: 2023 Pan American Canoe Slalom Championships in (Brazil) Três Coroas
- May 18–21: 2023 Asian Junior & U23 Canoe Slalom Championships in (Thailand) Pattaya
- August 15–20: 2023 World Junior and U23 Canoe Slalom Championships in (Poland) Kraków
- September 19–24: 2023 ICF Canoe Slalom World Championships in (United Kingdom) London
- October 27–29: 2023 Asian Canoe Slalom Championships in (Japan) Tokyo
- TBA: 2023 African Canoe Slalom Championships in Morocco (location TBA)

Canoe Slalom World Cup

- June 2–4: CSWC #1 in (Germany) Augsburg
- June 9–11: CSWC #2 in (Czech Republic) Prague
- June 16–18: CSWC #3 in (Slovenia) Ljubljana
- September 1–3: CSWC #4 in (Spain) La Seu d'Urgell
- October 5–8 CSWC #5 (final) in (France) Vaires-sur-Marne

=== Canoe sprint ===
World & Continental Championships

- July 6–9: 2023 World Junior and U23 Canoe Sprint Championships in (Italy) Auronzo di Cadore
- July 27–30: 2023 European Junior and U23 Canoe Sprint Championships in (Portugal) Montemor-o-Velho
- August 23–27: 2023 ICF Canoe Sprint World Championships in (Germany) Duisburg

Canoe Sprint World Cup

- May 11–14: Canoe Sprint WC #1 in (Hungary) Szeged
- May 26–28: Canoe Sprint WC #2 in (Poland) Poznań
- August 30 – September 1: Canoe Sprint WC #3 (final) in (France) Paris

== Cheerleading ==
- TBD:2023 The Cheerleading Worlds

== Cricket ==
=== 2023 Tri Series ===
- January 19 – February 2: 2022–23 South Africa women's Tri-Nation Series in South Africa
  - (gold) : South Africa, (silver) : India, (bronze) : West Indies
- February 14–21: 2023 Nepal Tri-Nation Series in Nepal
- February 27 – March 6: 2023 United Arab Emirates Tri-Nation Series in United Arab Emirates
- March 9–16: 2023 Nepal Tri-Nation Series in Nepal

=== The Ashes ===
- June 16 – July 31: 2023 Ashes series
  - The five-match series was drawn 2–2, therefore Australia retained The Ashes.

=== Asia Cup ===
- September 1: 2023 Asia Cup in Pakistan

India defeated Sri Lanka

=== World Championships and World Cups ===
- January 14–29: 2023 ICC Under-19 Women's T20 World Cup in South Africa
  - In the final, India def. England, 69/3 (14 overs)–68 (17.1 overs). India won by 7 wickets.
- February 10–26: 2023 ICC Women's T20 World Cup in South Africa
  - In the final, Australia def. South Africa, 156/6 (20 overs)–137/6 (20 overs). Australia won by 19 runs.
- October 5 – November 19: 2023 Cricket World Cup in India
  - In the final, Australia def. India, 241/4 (43 overs)-240 (50 overs). Australia won by 6 wickets.
- 2021–23 ICC World Test Championship Final

== Cycling – BMX ==
=== 2023 UCI BMX Freestyle World Cup ===
- February 15 – 18: World Cup #1 in (Saudi Arabia) Diriyah
  - Winners: (Australia) Logan Martin (m) / (United States) Hannah Roberts (f)

== Cycling – Cross ==
- February 3 – 5: 2023 UCI Cyclo-cross World Championships in (Netherlands) Hoogerheide
  - Elite winners: (Netherlands) Mathieu van der Poel (m) / (Netherlands) Fem van Empel (f)
  - U23 winners: (Belgium) Thibau Nys (m) / (Netherlands) Shirin van Anrooij (f)
  - Juniors winners: (France) Léo Bisiaux (m) / (Canada) Isabella Holmgren (f)

=== 2022–23 UCI Cyclo-cross World Cup ===
- October 9, 2022: UCI Cyclo-cross World Cup #1 in (United States) Waterloo
  - Winners: (Belgium) Eli Iserbyt (m) / (Netherlands) Fem van Empel (f)
- October 16, 2022: UCI Cyclo-cross World Cup #2 in (United States) Fayetteville
  - Winners: (Belgium) Eli Iserbyt (m) / (Netherlands) Fem van Empel (f)
- October 23, 2022: UCI Cyclo-cross World Cup #3 in (Czech Republic) Tábor
  - Winners: (Belgium) Eli Iserbyt (m) / (Netherlands) Fem van Empel (f)
  - U23 winner: (Belgium) Thibau Nys
  - Juniors winners: (France) Léo Bisiaux (m) / (Netherlands) Lauren Molengraaf
- October 30, 2022: UCI Cyclo-cross World Cup #4 in (Belgium) Maasmechelen
  - Winners: (Belgium) Laurens Sweeck (m) / (Netherlands) Fem van Empel (f)
  - U23 winner: (Belgium) Thibau Nys
  - Juniors winners: (Netherlands) Guus van den Einden (m) / (Netherlands) Lauren Molengraaf
- November 13, 2022: UCI Cyclo-cross World Cup #5 in (Netherlands) Hilvarenbeek
  - Winners: (Belgium) Laurens Sweeck (m) / (Netherlands) Shirin van Anrooij (f)
- November 20, 2022: UCI Cyclo-cross World Cup #6 in (Belgium) Overijse
  - Winners: (Belgium) Michael Vanthourenhout (m) / (Netherlands) Puck Pieterse (f)
- November 27, 2022: UCI Cyclo-cross World Cup #7 in (Netherlands) Hulst
  - Winners: (Netherlands) Mathieu van der Poel (m) / (Netherlands) Puck Pieterse (f)
- December 4, 2022: UCI Cyclo-cross World Cup #8 in (Belgium) Antwerp
  - Winners: (Netherlands) Mathieu van der Poel (m) / (Netherlands) Fem van Empel (f)
- December 11, 2022: UCI Cyclo-cross World Cup #9 in (Republic of Ireland) Dublin
  - Winners: (Belgium) Wout van Aert (m) / (Netherlands) Fem van Empel (f)
- December 17, 2022: UCI Cyclo-cross World Cup #10 in (Italy) Val di Sole
  - Winners: (Belgium) Michael Vanthourenhout (m) / (Netherlands) Puck Pieterse (f)
- December 26, 2022: UCI Cyclo-cross World Cup #11 in (Belgium) Gavere
  - Winners: (Netherlands) Mathieu van der Poel (m) / (Netherlands) Shirin van Anrooij (f)
- January 8: UCI Cyclo-cross World Cup #12 in (Belgium) Zonhoven
  - Winners: (Belgium) Wout van Aert (m) / (Netherlands) Shirin van Anrooij (f)
  - U23 winner: (Belgium) Thibau Nys
  - Juniors winners: (France) Léo Bisiaux (m) / (Netherlands) Lauren Molengraaf (f)
- January 22: UCI Cyclo-cross World Cup #13 in (Spain) Benidorm
  - Winners: (Netherlands) Mathieu van der Poel (m) / (Netherlands) Fem van Empel (f)
  - U23 winner: (Belgium) Thibau Nys
  - Juniors winners: (Belgium) Yordi Corsus (m) / (Netherlands) Lauren Molengraaf (f)
- January 29: UCI Cyclo-cross World Cup #14 in (France) Besançon (final)
  - Winners: / (Netherlands) Puck Pieterse (f)
  - U23 winner: (Netherlands) Tibor del Grosso
  - Juniors winners: (Belgium) Seppe van den Boer (m) / (Canada) Ava Holmgren (f)
- Overall winners: (Belgium) Laurens Sweeck (m) / (Netherlands) Fem van Empel (f)

== Cycling – Gran Fondo ==
=== 2022–2023 UCI Gran Fondo World Series ===
- September 11, 2022: Amy's Great Ocean Road Gran Fondo in Australia
  - Winners: (Australia) Tynan Shannon (m) / (Australia) Jennifer Pettenon (f)
- October 1 & 2, 2022: Tre Valli Varesine Gran Fondo in Italy
  - Winners: (Liechtenstein) Michele Paonne (m) / (Czech Republic) Monika Veitová (f)
- October 14–16, 2022: Tour de Bintan in Indonesia
  - Winners: (Canada) Mathieu Bédard (m) / (Singapore) Ava Woo (f)
- November 17–20, 2022: GranFondo Antalya in Turkey
  - Winners: (Turkey) Emir Demir (m) / (Turkey) Meltem Kılıç (f)
- February 2–4: UCI Granfondo Jordan Dead Sea in Jordan
  - Winners: Sergey Trubetskoy (m) / (United States) Meredith Byrne (f)

== Cycling – Road ==
- February 8–13: 2023 CAC African Continental Road Championships in (Ghana) Accra
  - Elite RR winners: (Eritrea) Henok Mulubrhan (m) / (Nigeria) Ese Lovina Ukpeseraye (f)
  - Elite ITT winners: (Uganda) Charles Kagimu (m) / (Mauritius) Aurelie Halbwachs (f)
  - U23 RR winners: (Rwanda) Renus Byiza Uhiriwe (m) / (Rwanda) Diane Ingabire (f)
  - U23 ITT winners: (Ethiopia) Kiya Rogora (m) / (Algeria) Nesrine Houili (f)
  - Juniors RR winners: (Algeria) Riad Bakhti (m) / (Algeria) Malak Mechab (f)
  - Juniors ITT winners: (Algeria) Djaoued Nhari (m) / (Algeria) Siham Bousba (f)
  - Elite TTT winners: Algeria (Hamza Amari, Hamza Mansouri, Nassim Saidi, Azzedine Lagab) (m) / Mauritius (Raphaëlle Lamusse, Kimberley Le Court, Lucie de Marigny-Lagesse, Aurelie Halbwachs) (f)
  - Juniors TTT winners: Algeria (Riad Bakhti, Nasrallah Essemiani, Bachir Chennafi, Djaoued Chams Eddine Nhari) (m) / Algeria (Mechab Malik, Soulef Silmi, Siham Bousba, Hosna Bellile) (f)
  - Mixed TT winners: Mauritius (Aurelie Halbwachs, Raphaëlle Lamusse, Kimberley Le Court, Alexandre Mayer, Gregory Mayer, Christopher Lagane)
- June 7–13: 2023 Asian Road Cycling Championships in (Thailand) Rayong
  - Elite RR winners: (Kazakhstan) Gleb Brussenskiy (m) / (Vietnam) Nguyễn Thị Thật (f)
  - Elite ITT winners: (Kazakhstan) Yevgeniy Fedorov (m) / (Uzbekistan) Olga Zabelinskaya (f)
  - U23 RR winners: (Kazakhstan) Ruslan Aliyev (m)
  - U23 ITT winners: (Kazakhstan) Andrey Remkhe (m) / (Uzbekistan) Yanina Kuskova (f)
  - Juniors RR winners: (Thailand) Tinnapat Muangdet (m) / (Vietnam) Thach Thi Ngoc Thao (f)
  - Juniors ITT winners: (Kazakhstan) Mikhail Podluzhnyy (m) / (Vietnam) Nguyen Thi Be Hong (f)
  - Elite Mixed TTT winners: Kazakhstan (Yevgeniy Fedorov, Dmitriy Gruzdev, Igor Chzhan, Makhabbat Umutzhanova, Rinata Sultanova, Marina Kuzmina)
  - Juniors Mixed TTT winners: Kazakhstan (Batyrkhan Alik, Mansur Beisembay, Mikhail Podluzhnyy, Viktoriya Marchuk, Yekaterina Udovykina, Yevgeniya Zaam)
- August 5–13: 2023 UCI Road World Championships in Scotland
  - Elite RR winners: (Netherlands) Mathieu van der Poel (m) / (Belgium) Lotte Kopecky (f)
  - Elite ITT winners: (Belgium) Remco Evenepoel (m) / (United States) Chloé Dygert (f)
  - U23 RR winners: (France) Axel Laurance (m) / (Hungary) Blanka Vas (f)
  - U23 ITT winners: (Italy) Lorenzo Milesi (m) / (Germany) Antonia Niedermaier (f)
  - Juniors RR winners: (Denmark) Albert Philipsen (m) / (France) Julie Bego (f)
  - Juniors ITT winners: (Australia) Oscar Chamberlain (m) / (Australia) Felicity Wilson-Haffenden (f)
  - Elite Mixed TTT winners: Switzerland (Stefan Bissegger, Stefan Küng, Mauro Schmid, Elise Chabbey, Nicole Koller, Marlen Reusser)

=== 2023 UCI World Tour ===
- January 17–22: 2023 Tour Down Under in Australia
  - Winner: (Australia) Jay Vine (UAE Team Emirates)
- January 29: 2023 Cadel Evans Great Ocean Road Race in Australia
  - Winner: (Germany) Marius Mayrhofer (Team DSM)
- February 20–26: 2023 UAE Tour in United Arab Emirates
  - Winner: (Belgium) Remco Evenepoel (Soudal–Quick-Step)
- February 25: 2023 Omloop Het Nieuwsblad in Belgium
  - Winner: (Netherlands) Dylan van Baarle (Team Jumbo–Visma)
- March 4: 2023 Strade Bianche in Italy
  - Winner: (United Kingdom) Tom Pidcock (INEOS Grenadiers)
- March 5–12: 2023 Paris–Nice in France
  - Winner: (Slovenia) Tadej Pogačar (UAE Team Emirates)
- March 6–12: 2023 Tirreno–Adriatico in Italy
  - Winner: (Slovenia) Primož Roglič (Team Jumbo–Visma)
- March 18: 2023 Milan–San Remo in Italy
  - Winner: (Netherlands) Mathieu van der Poel (Alpecin–Deceuninck)
- March 20–26: 2023 Volta a Catalunya in Spain
  - Winner: (Slovenia) Primož Roglič (Team Jumbo–Visma)
- March 22: 2023 Classic Brugge–De Panne in Belgium
  - Winner: (Belgium) Jasper Philipsen (Alpecin–Deceuninck)
- March 24: 2023 E3 Saxo Classic in Belgium
  - Winner: (Belgium) Wout van Aert (Team Jumbo–Visma)
- March 26: 2023 Gent–Wevelgem in Belgium
  - Winner: (France) Christophe Laporte (Team Jumbo–Visma)
- March 29: 2023 Dwars door Vlaanderen in Belgium
  - Winner: (France) Christophe Laporte (Team Jumbo–Visma)
- April 2: 2023 Tour of Flanders in Belgium
  - Winner: (Slovenia) Tadej Pogačar (UAE Team Emirates)
- April 3–8: 2023 Tour of the Basque Country in Spain
  - Winner: (Denmark) Jonas Vingegaard (Team Jumbo–Visma)
- April 9: 2023 Paris–Roubaix in France
  - Winner: (Netherlands) Mathieu van der Poel (Alpecin–Deceuninck)
- April 16: 2023 Amstel Gold Race in the Netherlands
  - Winner: (Slovenia) Tadej Pogačar (UAE Team Emirates)
- April 19: 2023 La Flèche Wallonne in Belgium
  - Winner: (Slovenia) Tadej Pogačar (UAE Team Emirates)
- April 23: 2023 Liège–Bastogne–Liège in Belgium
  - Winner: (Belgium) Remco Evenepoel (Soudal–Quick-Step)
- April 25–30: 2023 Tour de Romandie in Switzerland
  - Winner: (United Kingdom) Adam Yates (UAE Team Emirates)
- May 6–28: 2023 Giro d'Italia in Italy
  - Winner: (Slovenia) Primož Roglič (Team Jumbo–Visma)
- June 4–11: 2023 Critérium du Dauphiné in France
  - Winner: (Denmark) Jonas Vingegaard (Team Jumbo–Visma)
- June 11–18: 2023 Tour de Suisse in Switzerland
  - Winner: (Denmark) Mattias Skjelmose (Trek–Segafredo)
- July 1–23: 2023 Tour de France in France
  - Winner: (Denmark) Jonas Vingegaard (Team Jumbo–Visma)
- July 29: 2023 Clásica de San Sebastián in Spain
  - Winner: (Belgium) Remco Evenepoel (Soudal–Quick-Step)
- July 29 – August 4: 2023 Tour de Pologne in Poland
  - Winner: (Slovenia) Matej Mohorič (Team Bahrain Victorious)
- August 20: 2023 Hamburg Cyclassics in Germany
  - Winner: (Denmark) Mads Pedersen (Lidl–Trek)
- August 23–27: 2023 Renewi Tour in Belgium and the Netherlands
  - Winner: (Belgium) Tim Wellens (UAE Team Emirates)
- August 26 – September 17: 2023 Vuelta a España in Spain
  - Winner: (United States) Sepp Kuss (Team Jumbo–Visma)
- September 3: 2023 Bretagne Classic Ouest-France in France
  - Winner: (France) Valentin Madouas (Groupama–FDJ)
- September 8: 2023 Grand Prix Cycliste de Québec in Canada
  - Winner: (Belgium) Arnaud De Lie (Lotto–Dstny)
- September 10: 2023 Grand Prix Cycliste de Montréal in Canada
  - Winner: (United Kingdom) Adam Yates (UAE Team Emirates)
- October 7: 2023 Il Lombardia in Italy
  - Winner: (Slovenia) Tadej Pogačar (UAE Team Emirates)
- October 12–17: 2023 Tour of Guangxi in China
  - Winner: (Netherlands) Milan Vader (Team Jumbo–Visma)

=== 2023 UCI ProSeries ===
- January 22–29: 2023 Vuelta a San Juan in Argentina
  - Winner: (Colombia) Miguel Ángel López (Team Medellín–EPM)
- February 1 – 5: 2023 Volta a la Comunitat Valenciana in Spain
  - Winner: (Portugal) Rui Costa (Intermarché–Circus–Wanty)
- February 11–15: 2023 Tour of Oman in Oman
  - Winner: (United States) Matteo Jorgenson (Movistar Team)
- February 12: 2023 Clásica de Almería in Spain
  - Winner: (Italy) Matteo Moschetti (Q36.5 Pro Cycling Team)
- February 15–19: 2023 Volta ao Algarve in Portugal
  - Winner: (Colombia) Daniel Martínez (INEOS Grenadiers)
- February 15–19: 2023 Vuelta a Andalucía in Spain
  - Winner: (Slovenia) Tadej Pogačar (UAE Team Emirates)
- February 25: 2023 Faun-Ardèche Classic in France
  - Winner: (France) Julian Alaphilippe (Soudal–Quick-Step)
- February 26: 2023 Kuurne–Brussels–Kuurne in Belgium
  - Winner: (Belgium) Tiesj Benoot (Team Jumbo–Visma)
- February 26: 2023 Faun Drôme Classic in France
  - Winner: (France) Anthony Perez (Cofidis)
- March 1: 2023 Trofeo Laigueglia in Italy
  - Winner: (France) Nans Peters (AG2R Citroën Team)
- March 15: 2023 Milano–Torino in Italy
  - Winner: (Netherlands) Arvid de Kleijn (Tudor Pro Cycling Team)
- March 15: 2023 Nokere Koerse in Belgium
  - Winner: (Belgium) Tim Merlier (Soudal–Quick-Step)
- March 16: 2023 Grand Prix de Denain in France
  - Winner: (Colombia) Juan Sebastián Molano (UAE Team Emirates)
- March 17: 2023 Bredene Koksijde Classic in Belgium
  - Winner: (Belgium) Gerben Thijssen (Intermarché–Circus–Wanty)
- March 26: 2023 GP Industria & Artigianato di Larciano in Italy
  - Winner: (Republic of Ireland) Ben Healy (EF Education–EasyPost)
- April 1: 2023 GP Miguel Induráin in Spain
  - Winner: (Spain) Ion Izagirre (Cofidis)
- April 5: 2023 Scheldeprijs in Belgium
  - Winner: (Belgium) Jasper Philipsen (Alpecin–Deceuninck)
- April 12: 2023 Brabantse Pijl in Belgium
  - Winner: (France) Dorian Godon (AG2R Citroën Team)
- April 17–21: 2023 Tour of the Alps in Italy
  - Winner: (United Kingdom) Tao Geoghegan Hart (INEOS Grenadiers)
- May 6: 2023 Grand Prix du Morbihan in France
  - Winner: (Belgium) Arnaud De Lie (Lotto–Dstny)
- May 7: 2023 Tro-Bro Léon in France
  - Winner: (Italy) Giacomo Nizzolo (Israel–Premier Tech)
- May 10–14: 2023 Tour de Hongrie in Hungary
  - Winner: (Switzerland) Marc Hirschi (UAE Team Emirates)
- May 16–21: 2023 Four Days of Dunkirk in France
  - Winner: (France) Romain Grégoire (Groupama–FDJ)
- May 25–28: 2023 Boucles de la Mayenne in France
  - Winner: (Spain) Oier Lazkano (Movistar Team)
- May 26–29: 2023 Tour of Norway in Norway
  - Winner: (United Kingdom) Ben Tulett (INEOS Grenadiers)
- June 4: 2023 Brussels Cycling Classic in Belgium
  - Winner: (France) Arnaud Démare (Groupama–FDJ)
- June 7–11: 2023 ZLM Tour in the Netherlands
  - Winner: (Netherlands) Olav Kooij (Team Jumbo–Visma)
- June 10: 2023 Dwars door het Hageland in Belgium
  - Winner: (Norway) Rasmus Tiller (Uno-X Pro Cycling Team)
- June 13: 2023 Mont Ventoux Dénivelé Challenge in France
  - Winner: (France) Lenny Martinez (Groupama–FDJ)
- June 14–18: 2023 Tour of Belgium in Belgium
  - Winner: (Netherlands) Mathieu van der Poel (Alpecin–Deceuninck)
- June 14–18: 2023 Tour of Slovenia in Slovenia
  - Winner: (Italy) Filippo Zana (Team Jayco–AlUla)
- July 9–16: 2023 Tour of Qinghai Lake in China
  - Winner: (Eritrea) Henok Mulubrhan (Green Project–Bardiani–CSF–Faizanè)
- July 22–26: 2023 Tour de Wallonie in Belgium
  - Winner: (Italy) Filippo Ganna (INEOS Grenadiers)
- August 15–19: 2023 Danmark Rundt in Denmark
  - Winner: (Denmark) Mads Pedersen (Lidl–Trek)
- August 15–19: 2023 Vuelta a Burgos in Spain
  - Winner: (Slovenia) Primož Roglič (Team Jumbo–Visma)
- August 17–20: 2023 Arctic Race of Norway in Norway
  - Winner: (United Kingdom) Stephen Williams (Israel–Premier Tech)
- August 23–27: 2023 Deutschland Tour in Germany
  - Winner: (Belgium) Ilan Van Wilder (Soudal–Quick-Step)
- September 3: 2023 Maryland Cycling Classic in the United States
  - Winner: (Denmark) Mattias Skjelmose (Trek–Segafredo)
- September 3–10: 2023 Tour of Britain in Great Britain
  - Winner: (Belgium) Wout van Aert (Team Jumbo–Visma)
- September 10: 2023 Grand Prix de Fourmies in France
  - Winner: (Belgium) Tim Merlier (Soudal–Quick-Step)
- September 13: 2023 Grand Prix de Wallonie in Belgium
  - Winner: (Spain) Gonzalo Serrano (Movistar Team)
- September 14: 2023 Coppa Sabatini in Italy
  - Winner: (Switzerland) Marc Hirschi (UAE Team Emirates)
- September 14–17: 2023 Tour of Taihu Lake in China
  - Winner: (New Zealand) George Jackson (Bolton Equities Black Spoke)
- September 16: 2023 Super 8 Classic in Belgium
  - Winner: (Netherlands) Mathieu van der Poel (Alpecin–Deceuninck)
- September 20–24: 2023 Tour de Luxembourg in Luxembourg
  - Winner: (Switzerland) Marc Hirschi (UAE Team Emirates)
- September 23–30: 2023 Tour de Langkawi in Malaysia
  - Winner: (United Kingdom) Simon Carr (EF Education–EasyPost)
- September 28: 2023 Circuit Franco–Belge in Belgium
  - Winner: (Belgium) Arnaud De Lie (Lotto–Dstny)
- September 30: 2023 Giro dell'Emilia in Italy
  - Winner: (Slovenia) Primož Roglič (Team Jumbo–Visma)
- October 2: 2023 Coppa Bernocchi in Italy
  - Winner: (Belgium) Wout van Aert (Team Jumbo–Visma)
- October 3: 2023 Münsterland Giro in Germany
  - Winner: (Norway) Per Strand Hagenes (Team Jumbo–Visma)
- October 3: 2023 Tre Valli Varesine in Italy
  - Winner: (Belgium) Ilan Van Wilder (Soudal–Quick-Step)
- October 5: 2023 Gran Piemonte in Italy
  - Winner: (Italy) Andrea Bagioli (Soudal–Quick-Step)
- October 5–9: 2023 Tour of Hainan in China
  - Winner: (Spain) Óscar Sevilla (Team Medellín–EPM)
- October 8: 2023 Paris–Tours in France
  - Winner: (United States) Riley Sheehan (Israel–Premier Tech)
- October 11: 2023 Giro del Veneto in Italy
  - Winner: (France) Dorian Godon (AG2R Citroën Team)
- October 15: 2023 Japan Cup in Japan
  - Winner: (Portugal) Rui Costa (Intermarché–Circus–Wanty)
- October 15: 2023 Veneto Classic in Italy
  - Winner: (Italy) Davide Formolo (UAE Team Emirates)

=== 2023 UCI Women's World Tour ===
- January 15–17: 2023 Women's Tour Down Under in Australia
  - Winner: (Australia) Grace Brown (FDJ–Suez)
- January 28: 2023 Cadel Evans Great Ocean Road Race in Australia
  - Winner: (Netherlands) Loes Adegeest (Arkéa–Samsic)
- February 9–12: 2023 UAE Tour in United Arab Emirates
  - Winner: (Italy) Elisa Longo Borghini (Trek–Segafredo)
- February 25: 2023 Omloop Het Nieuwsblad in Belgium
  - Winner: (Belgium) Lotte Kopecky (SD Worx)
- March 4: 2023 Strade Bianche Donne in Italy
  - Winner: (Netherlands) Demi Vollering (SD Worx)
- March 11: 2023 Ronde van Drenthe in Netherlands
  - Winner: (Netherlands) Lorena Wiebes (SD Worx)
- March 19: 2023 Trofeo Alfredo Binda-Comune di Cittiglio in Italy
  - Winner: (Netherlands) Shirin van Anrooij (Trek–Segafredo)
- March 23: 2023 Classic Brugge–De Panne Women in Belgium
  - Winner: (United Kingdom) Pfeiffer Georgi (Team DSM)
- March 26: 2023 Gent–Wevelgem (women's race) in Belgium
  - Winner: (Switzerland) Marlen Reusser (SD Worx)
- April 2: 2023 Tour of Flanders for Women in Belgium
  - Winner: (Belgium) Lotte Kopecky (SD Worx)
- April 8: 2023 Paris–Roubaix Femmes in France
  - Winner: (Canada) Alison Jackson (EF Education–Tibco–SVB)
- April 16: 2023 Amstel Gold Race in Netherlands
  - Winner: (Netherlands) Demi Vollering (SD Worx)
- April 19: 2023 La Flèche Wallonne Féminine in Belgium
  - Winner: (Netherlands) Demi Vollering (SD Worx)
- April 23: 2023 Liège–Bastogne–Liège Femmes in Belgium
  - Winner: (Netherlands) Demi Vollering (SD Worx)
- May 1–7: 2023 La Vuelta Femenina in Spain
  - Winner: (Netherlands) Annemiek van Vleuten (Movistar Team)
- May 12–14: 2023 Itzulia Women in Spain
  - Winner: (Switzerland) Marlen Reusser (SD Worx)
- May 18–21: 2023 Vuelta a Burgos Feminas in Spain
  - Winner: (Netherlands) Demi Vollering (SD Worx)
- May 26–28: 2023 RideLondon Classique in Great Britain
  - Winner: (Netherlands) Charlotte Kool (Team DSM)
- June 17–20: 2023 Tour de Suisse Women in Switzerland
  - Winner: (Switzerland) Marlen Reusser (SD Worx)
- June 30 – July 9: 2023 Giro Donne in Italy
  - Winner: (Netherlands) Annemiek van Vleuten (Movistar Team)
- July 23–30: 2023 Tour de France Femmes in France
  - Winner: (Netherlands) Demi Vollering (SD Worx)

=== 2023 UCI Women's ProSeries ===
- February 15–19: 2023 Setmana Valenciana-Volta Comunitat Valenciana Fémines in Spain
  - Winner: (Belgium) Justine Ghekiere (AG Insurance–Soudal–Quick-Step)
- March 15: 2023 Nokere Koerse in Belgium
  - Winner: (Belgium) Lotte Kopecky (SD Worx)
- March 29: 2023 Dwars door Vlaanderen for Women in Belgium
  - Winner: (Netherlands) Demi Vollering (SD Worx)
- April 12: 2023 Brabantse Pijl in Belgium
  - Winner: (Italy) Silvia Persico (UAE Team ADQ)
- April 29–30: 2023 Festival Elsy Jacobs in Luxembourg
  - Winner: (New Zealand) Ally Wollaston (AG Insurance–Soudal–Quick-Step)
- May 10: 2023 Clasica Femenina Navarra in Spain
  - Winner: (Netherlands) Riejanne Markus (Team Jumbo–Visma)
- May 23–28: 2023 Thüringen Ladies Tour in Germany
  - Winner: (Belgium) Lotte Kopecky (SD Worx)

== Cycling – Track ==
- February 8 – 12: 2023 UEC European Track Championships in (Switzerland) Grenchen
  - (gold) : Germany, (silver) : United Kingdom, (bronze) : Netherlands
- March 5–9: 2023 African Track Cycling Championships in (Egypt) Cairo
- March 24–28: 2023 Oceania Track Championships in (Australia) Brisbane
- June 14–19: 2023 Asian Track Cycling Championships in Nilai
  - (gold) : Japan, (silver) : China, (bronze) : Malaysia

=== 2023 UCI Track Cycling Nations Cup ===
- February 23 – 26: TNC #1 in (Indonesia) Jakarta
- March 14–17: TNC #2 in (Egypt) Cairo
- April 20–23: TNC #3 in (Canada) Milton

== Darts ==
=== Professional Darts Corporation ===
- December 15, 2022 – January 3: 2023 PDC World Darts Championship in (England) London
  - (England) Michael Smith defeated (Netherlands) Michael van Gerwen, 7–4.
- January 27–29: 2023 Masters in (England) Milton Keynes
  - (England) Chris Dobey defeated (England) Rob Cross, 11–7.
- February 2 – May 25: 2023 Premier League Darts
- March 3–5: 2023 UK Open in (England) Minehead
  - (England) Andrew Gilding defeated (Netherlands) Michael van Gerwen, 11–10.
- June 15–17: 2023 PDC World Cup of Darts in (Germany) Frankfurt
- July 15–23: 2023 World Matchplay in (England) Blackpool
- October 2–8: 2023 World Grand Prix in (England) Leicester
- October 26–29: 2023 European Championship in (Germany) Dortmund
- November 11–19: 2023 Grand Slam of Darts in (England) Wolverhampton
- November 24–26: 2023 Players Championship Finals in (England) Minehead

==== World Series of Darts ====
- January 12–13: 2023 Bahrain Darts Masters in Sakhir
  - (England) Michael Smith defeated (Wales) Gerwyn Price, 8–6.
- January 20–21: 2023 Nordic Darts Masters in (Denmark) Copenhagen
  - (Scotland) Peter Wright defeated (Wales) Gerwyn Price, 11–5.
- June 2–3: 2023 US Darts Masters in (United States) New York City
  - (Netherlands) Michael van Gerwen defeated (Canada) Jeff Smith, 8–0.
- August 4–5: 2023 New Zealand Darts Masters in Hamilton
  - (England) Rob Cross defeated (England) Nathan Aspinall, 8–7.
- August 11–12: 2023 New South Wales Darts Masters in (Australia) Wollongong
  - (England) Rob Cross defeated (Australia) Damon Heta, 8–1.
- September 15–16: 2023 World Series of Darts Finals in (Netherlands) Amsterdam
  - (Netherlands) Michael van Gerwen defeated (England) Nathan Aspinall, 11–4.

=== World Darts Federation ===
- December 2–10: 2022 WDF World Darts Championship in (England) Frimley Green

== Dance sport ==
=== Dance sport World & Continental Championships ===
- January 14: WDSF European Championship (Senior IV Standard) in (Spain) Cartagena
  - (gold) : (Italy) Roberto Furlan & Daniela Sattin, (silver) : (Austria) Michael Pauser & Claudia Molecz, (bronze) : (France) Olivier Gastaldi & Muriel Haegel Gastaldi

=== 2023 World Open ===
- January 28: World Open #1 in (Germany) Pforzheim
  - Winners: (France) Charles-Guillaume Schmitt & Elena Salikhova
- February 11 & 12: World Open #2 in (Belgium) Antwerp

=== 2023 BfG World Series ===
- February 24 & 25: BfG World Series #1 in (Japan) Kitakyushu

== Fencing ==
=== Fencing World & Continental Championships ===
- February 18–20: 2023 African Junior Fencing Championships in (Ghana) Accra
- February 25–28: 2023 European Cadets and Juniors Fencing Championships in (Estonia) Tallinn
- February 28 – March 6: 2023 Pan American Cadets and Juniors Fencing Championships in (Colombia) Bogotá
- March 5–8: 2023 Asian Cadets and Juniors Fencing Championships in (Uzbekistan) Tashkent
- April 1–9: 2023 World Cadets and Juniors Fencing Championships in (Bulgaria) Plovdiv
  - (gold) : United States, (silver) : Hungary, (bronze) : Egypt
- June 17–22: 2023 Asian Fencing Championships in Wuxi
  - (gold) : Japan, (silver) : South Korea, (bronze) : China
- July 22–30: 2023 World Fencing Championships in Milan
  - (gold) : Italy, (silver) : Hungary, (bronze) : Japan
- June 19–23: 2023 African Fencing Championships in Cairo
  - (gold) : Egypt, (silver) : Algeria, (bronze) : Kenya
- TBA: 2023 European Fencing Championships
- TBA: 2023 Pan American Fencing Championships

Fencing World Cup & Grand Prix – Senior Épée

Men

- November 11–13, 2022: Men's SE #1 in (Switzerland) Bern
  - Individual winner: (Hungary) Tibor Andrasfi
  - Team winners: France (Alexandre Bardenet, Yannick Borel, Romain Cannone, & Alex Fava)
- December 9–11, 2022: Men's SE #2 in (Canada) Vancouver
  - Individual winner: (Hungary) Gergely Siklósi
  - Team winners: France (Paul Allegre, Kendrick Jean Joseph, Nelson Lopez Pourtier, & Arthur Philippe)
- January 28 & 29: Men's Grand Prix #1 in (Qatar) Doha
  - Individual winner: (Hungary) Gergely Siklósi
- February 23–25: Men's SE #3 in (Germany) Heidenheim
  - Individual winner: (Japan) Koki Kano
  - Team winners: France (Alexandre Bardenet, Romain Cannone, Clement Dorigo, & Alex Fava)
- March 10–12: Men's Grand Prix #2 in (Hungary) Budapest
  - Individual winner: (Italy) Gabriele Cimini
- March 24–26: Men's SE #4 in (Argentina) Buenos Aires
  - Individual winner: (France) Alexandre Bardenet
  - Team winners: Hungary (Tibor Andrásfi, Máté Tamás Koch, David Nagy, & Gergely Siklósi)
- May 5–7: Men's Grand Prix #3 in (Colombia) Cali
  - Individual winner: (Czech Republic) Jiří Beran
- May 19–21: Men's SE #5 (final) in (Turkey) Istanbul
  - Individual winner: (France) Alexandre Bardenet
  - Team winners: Kazakhstan (Elmir Alimzhanov, Ruslan Kurbanov, Yerlik Sertay, Vadim Sharlaimov)

Women

- November 11–13, 2022: Women's SE #1 in (Estonia) Tallinn
  - Individual winner: (Italy) Alberta Santuccio
  - Team winners: Italy (Rossella Fiamingo, Federica Isola, Roberta Marzani, & Giulia Rizzi)
- December 8–11, 2022: Women's SE #2 in (Canada) Vancouver
  - Individual winner: (Italy) Giulia Rizzi
  - Team winners: France (Marie-Florence Candassamy, Joséphine Jacques-André-Coquin, Alexandra Louis Marie, & Auriane Mallo)
- January 27–29: Women's Grand Prix #1 in (Qatar) Doha
  - Individual winner: (Brazil) Nathalie Moellhausen
- February 10–12: Women's SE #3 in (Spain) Barcelona
  - Individual winner: (Brazil) Nathalie Moellhausen
  - Team winners: South Korea (Kang Young-mi, Lee Hye-in, Song Se-ra, & Yu Dan-woo)
- March 10–12: Women's Grand Prix #2 in (Hungary) Budapest
  - Individual winner: (Poland) Renata Knapik-Miazga
- March 24–26: Women's SE #4 in (China) Nanjing
  - Individual winner: (Hungary) Anna Kun
  - Team winners: France (Marie-Florence Candassamy, Alexandra Louis Marie, Auriane Mallo, & Coraline Vitalis)
- May 5–7: Women's Grand Prix #3 in (Colombia) Cali
  - Individual winner: (Hong Kong) Vivian Kong
- May 19–21: Women's SE #5 (final) in (United Arab Emirates) Fujairah
  - Individual winner: (South Korea) Song Se-ra
  - Team winners: France (Marie-Florence Candassamy, Alexandra Louis Marie, Auriane Mallo, & Coraline Vitalis)

Fencing World Cup – Junior Épée

Men

- November 5 & 6, 2022: Men's JE #1 in (Costa Rica) San José
  - Individual winner: (United States Virgin Islands) Kruz Schembri
  - Team winners: South Korea (BAE Jun-ho, KIM Hyun-bin, KIM Dong-hyeok, & LEE Ji-seong)
- November 19 & 20, 2022: Men's JE #2 in (Latvia) Riga
  - Individual winner: (Italy) Simone Mencarelli
  - Team winners: United States (Gabriel Feinberg, Henry Lawson, Skyler Liverant, & Thomas Whelan)
- December 3 & 4, 2022: Men's JE #3 in (Uzbekistan) Tashkent
  - Individual winner: (Kazakhstan) Bogdan Lukin
  - Team winners: Egypt (Mohamed Elsayed, Mahmoud Elsayed, Mohamed Gaber, & Mohamed Yasseen)
- December 17 & 18, 2022: Men's JE #4 in (Greece) Heraklion
  - Individual winner: (Italy) Marco Paganelli
  - Team winners: Italy (Fabrizio Cuomo, Nicolo' del Contrasto, Matteo Galassi, & Simone Mencarelli)
- January 6 & 7: Men's JE #5 in (Italy) Udine
  - Individual winner: (Egypt) Mohamed Elsayed
  - Team winners: Egypt (Mahmoud Elsayed, Mohamed Elsayed, Youssef Shamel, & Mohamed Yasseen)
- January 21 & 22: Men's JE #6 in (Bahrain) Manama
  - Individual winner: (Egypt) Mohamed Elsayed
  - Team winners: Egypt (Mohamed El-Sayed, Mahmoud El-Sayed, Mohamed Gaber, & Mohamed Yasseen)
- February 4 & 5: Men's JE #7 in (Switzerland) Basel
- February 18 & 19: Men's JE #8 (final) in (Serbia) Belgrade

Women

- November 4–6, 2022: Women's JE #1 in (Costa Rica) San José
  - Individual winner: (Ukraine) Yeva Mazur
  - Team winners: Uzbekistan (Shakhzoda Egamberdieva, Dilnaz Murzataeva, Sevara Rakhimova, & Biybimaryam Saparova)
- November 19 & 20, 2022: Women's JE #2 in Tashkent
  - Individual winner: (Uzbekistan) Sevara Rakhimova
  - Team winners: Uzbekistan (Shakhzoda Egamberdieva, Dilnaz Murzataeva, Sevara Rakhimova, & Biybimaryam Saparova)
- December 3 & 4, 2022: Women's JE #3 in (Germany) Laupheim
  - Individual winner: (United States) Hadley Husisian
  - Team winners: Italy (Gaia Caforio, Carola Maccagno, Lucrezia Paulis, & Vittoria Siletti)
- December 17 & 18, 2022: Women's JE #4 in (Spain) Burgos
  - Individual winner: (United States) Michaela Joyce
  - Team winners: France (Anaelle Doquet, Oceane Francillonne, Garance Palpacuer, & Elena Seille)
- January 7 & 8: Women's JE #5 in (Italy) Udine
  - Individual winner: (Israel) Alexandra Kravets
  - Team winners: Poland (Cecylia Cieslik, Alicja Klasik, Gloria Klughardt, & Kinga Zgryzniak)
- January 21 & 22: Women's JE #6 in Ma'alot-Tarshiha
  - Individual winner: (United States) Isabella Chin
  - Team winners: Israel (Adele Bogdanov, Nicole Feygin, Alexandra Kravets, & Sophia Vainberg)
- February 4 & 5: Women's JE #7 in (Turkey) Istanbul
- February 18 & 19: Women's JE #8 (final) in (France) Beauvais

Fencing World Cup & Grand Prix – Senior Foil

Men

- November 11–13, 2022: Men's SF #1 in (Germany) Bonn
  - Individual winner: (Japan) Kyosuke Matsuyama
  - Team winners: United States (Chase Emmer, Nick Itkin, Alexander Massialas, & Gerek Meinhardt)
- December 9–11, 2022: Men's SF #2 in (Japan) Tokyo
  - Individual winner: (Italy) Tommaso Marini
  - Team winners: United States (Miles Chamley-Watson, Nick Itkin, Alexander Massialas, & Gerek Meinhardt)
- January 12–14: Men's SF #3 in (France) Paris
  - Individual winner: (United States) Alexander Massialas
  - Team winners: Italy (Guillaume Bianchi, Alessio Foconi, Daniele Garozzo, & Tommaso Marini)
- February 10–12: Men's Grand Prix #1 in (Italy) Turin
  - Individual winner: (United States) Gerek Meinhardt
- February 23–26: Men's SF #4 in (Egypt) Cairo
  - Individual winner: (United States) Alexander Massialas
  - Team winners: Japan (Kazuki Iimura, Kyosuke Matsuyama, Takahiro Shikine, & Kenta Suzumura)
- March 17–19: Men's Grand Prix #2 in (South Korea) Busan
  - Individual winner: (Italy) Alessio Foconi
- May 5–7: Men's SF #5 in (Mexico) Acapulco
  - Individual winner: (Egypt) Mohamed Hamza
  - Team winners: United States (Miles Chamley-Watson, Nick Itkin, Alexander Massialas, & Gerek Meinhardt)
- May 19–21: Men's Grand Prix #3 (final) in (China) Shanghai
  - Individual winner: (United States) Alexander Massialas

Women

- December 9–11, 2022: Women's SF #1 in (Serbia) Belgrade
  - Individual winner: (Italy) Alice Volpi
  - Team winners: Italy (Erica Cipressa, Martina Favaretto, Francesca Palumbo, & Alice Volpi)
- January 12–14: Women's SF #2 in (France) Paris
  - Individual winner: (Italy) Alice Volpi
  - Team winners: Italy (Erica Cipressa, Martina Favaretto, Francesca Palumbo, & Alice Volpi)
- February 10–12: Women's Grand Prix #1 in (Italy) Turin
  - Individual winner: (France) Ysaora Thibus
- February 23–26: Women's SF #3 in (Egypt) Cairo
  - Individual winner: (Italy) Martina Favaretto
  - Team winners: Italy (Erica Cipressa, Martina Favaretto, Francesca Palumbo, & Alice Volpi)
- March 17–19: Women's Grand Prix #2 in (South Korea) Busan
  - Individual winner: (United States) Lee Kiefer
- April 21–23: Women's SF #4 in (Poland) Poznań
- May 5–7: Women's SF #5 in (Germany) Tauberbischofsheim
- May 19–21: Women's Grand Prix #3 (final) in (China) Shanghai
  - Individual winner: (Germany) Anne Sauer

Fencing World Cup – Junior Foil

Men

- November 4 & 5, 2022: Men's JF #1 in (United Kingdom) London
  - Individual winner: (United States) Chase Emmer
  - Team winners: Japan (Ryosuke Fukuda, Shoren Hayashi, Kazuki Iimura, & Yuki Kikumoto)
- November 18–20, 2022: Men's JF #2 in (Peru) Lima
  - Individual winner: (United States) Ethan Um
  - Team winners: United States (Sanjay Kasi, William Kelly, Samarth Kumbla, & Enoch Xiao)
- December 3 & 4, 2022: Men's JF #3 in (Poland) Leszno
  - Individual winner: (France) Anas Anane
  - Team winners: France (Wael Abdeljalil, Anas Anane, Eliot Chagnon, & Adrien Spichiger)
- December 16–18, 2022: Men's JF #4 in (Thailand) Bangkok
  - Individual winner: (France) Anas Anane
  - Team winners: United States (William Kelly, Samarth Kumbla, Richard Li, & Luao Yang)
- January 7 & 8: Men's JF #5 in Udine
  - Individual winner: (Italy) Giuseppe Franzoni
  - Team winners: Italy (Raian Adoul, Damiano di Veroli, Giuseppe Franzoni, & Mattia Raimondi)
- January 21 & 22: Men's JF #6 in (France) Aix-en-Provence
  - Individual winner: (France) Wael Abdeljalil
  - Team winners: United States (Chase Emmer, William Kelly, Samarth Kumbla, & Brandon Li)
- February 4 & 5: Men's JF #7 in (Brazil) São Paulo
- February 18 & 19: Men's JF #8 (final) in (Spain) Sabadell

Women

- November 4 & 5, 2022: Women's JF #1 in (United Kingdom) London
  - Individual winner: (Italy) Giulia Amore
  - Team winners: United States (Arianna Cao, Rachael Kim, Chin-Yi Kong, & Zander Rhodes)
- November 19 & 20, 2022: Women's JF #2 in (Peru) Lima
  - Individual winner: (United Kingdom) Carolina Stutchbury
  - Team winners: Hungary (Luca Kalocsai, Réka Kovács, Gréta Marosi, & Eszter Wolf)
- December 3 & 4, 2022: Women's JF #3 in (Uzbekistan) Tashkent
  - Individual winner: (Turkey) Almıla Birçe Durukan
  - Team winners: Romania (Andreea Dinca, Teodora Şofran, Maria Teodorescu, & Karina Vasile)
- December 16–18, 2022: Women's JF #4 in (Thailand) Bangkok
  - Individual winner: (Hong Kong) Daphne Nok-Sze Chan
  - Team winners: United States (Arianna Cao, Emily Jing, Rachael Kim, & Sophia Shen)
- January 6 & 7: Women's JF #5 in Udine
  - Individual winner: (Italy) Aurora Grandis
  - Team winners: Italy (Giulia Amore, Matilde Calvanese, Carlotta Ferrari, & Aurora Grandis)
- January 21 & 22: Women's JF #6 in (Croatia) Zagreb
  - Individual winner: (Italy) Carlotta Ferrari
  - Team winners: United States (Arianna Cao, Zander Rhodes, Lauren Scruggs, & Sophia Shen)
- February 4 & 5: Women's JF #7 in (Germany) Jena
- February 18 & 19: Women's JF #8 (final) in (Austria) Mödling

Fencing World Cup & Grand Prix – Senior Sabre

Men

- November 10–13, 2022: Men's SS #1 in (Algeria) Algiers
  - Individual winner: (Georgia (country)) Sandro Bazadze
  - Team winners: South Korea (Gu Bon-gil, Kim Jung-hwan, Kim Jun-ho, & Oh Sang-uk)
- December 8–10, 2022: Men's Grand Prix #1 in (France) Orléans
  - Individual winner: (Hungary) Áron Szilágyi
- January 13–15: Men's Grand Prix #2 in (Tunisia) Tunis
  - Individual winner: (Georgia (country)) Sandro Bazadze
- February 10–12: Men's SS #2 in (Poland) Warsaw
- March 2–4: Men's SS #3 in (Italy) Padua
  - Individual winner: (Italy) Michele Gallo
  - Team winners: Hungary (Tamás Decsi, Csanád Gémesi, András Szatmári, & Áron Szilágyi)
- March 24–26: Men's SS #4 in (Hungary) Budapest
  - Individual winner: (Hungary) Áron Szilágyi
  - Team winners: South Korea (Gu Bon-gil, Kim Jun-ho, Kim Jung-hwan, & Oh Sang-uk)
- April 27–29: Men's Grand Prix #3 in (South Korea) Seoul
  - Individual winner: (South Korea) Oh Sang-uk
- May 12–14: Men's SS #5 (final) in (Spain) Madrid
  - Individual winner: (Georgia (country)) Sandro Bazadze
  - Team winners: Hungary (Tamás Decsi, Csanád Gémesi, András Szatmári, & Áron Szilágyi)

Women

- November 10–13, 2022: Women's SS #1 in (Algeria) Algiers
  - Individual winner: (Spain) Lucía Martín-Portugués
  - Team winners: France (Manon Apithy-Brunet, Sara Balzer, Anne Poupinet, & Caroline Queroli)
- December 9 & 10, 2022: Women's Grand Prix #1 in (France) Orléans
  - Individual winner: (Italy) Martina Criscio
- January 14 & 15: Women's Grand Prix #2 in (Tunisia) Tunis
  - Individual winner: (Greece) Despina Georgiadou
- February 10–12: Women's SS #2 in (Uzbekistan) Tashkent
  - Individual winner: (Greece) Despina Georgiadou
- March 3–5: Women's SS #3 in (Greece) Athens
  - Individual winner: (Hungary) Sugár Katinka Battai
  - Team winners: France (Manon Apithy-Brunet, Sara Balzer, Caroline Queroli, & Margaux Rifkiss)
- March 17–19: Women's SS #4 in (Belgium) Sint-Niklaas
  - Individual winner: (France) Sara Balzer
  - Team winners: South Korea (Choi Se-bin, Jeon Eun-hye, Lee Han-ah, & Yun So-yeon)
- April 27–29: Women's Grand Prix #3 in (South Korea) Seoul
  - Individual winner: (Greece) Theodóra Gkountoúra
- May 12–14: Women's SS #5 (final) in (Georgia (country)) Batumi
  - Individual winner: (France) Sara Balzer
  - Team winners: Ukraine (Yuliya Bakastova, Olha Kharlan, Alina Komashchuk & Olena Kravatska)

Fencing World Cup – Junior Sabre

Men

- November 5 & 6, 2022: Men's JS #1 in (Iran) Tehran
  - Individual winner: (South Korea) KIM Jun-hyeong
  - Team winners: South Korea (KIM Jun-hyeong, KIM Ga-kyeong, KIM Min-jun, & NA Min-uk)
- November 19 & 20, 2022: Men's JS #2 in (Tunisia) Hammamet
  - Individual winner: (Spain) Santiago Madrigal
  - Team winners: Egypt (Ahmed Hesham, Eyad Marouf, Adham Moataz, & Zeyad Nofal)
- December 3 & 4, 2022: Men's JS #3 in (Poland) Sosnowiec
  - Individual winner: (Bulgaria) Todor Stoychev
  - Team winners: Italy (Edoardo Cantini, Marco Mastrullo, Emanuele Nardella, & Leonardo Tocci)
- December 17 & 18, 2022: Men's JS #4 in (Germany) Dormagen
  - Individual winner: (United States) Colin Heathcock
  - Team winners: Japan (Tomoaki Chano, Yuto Hirata, Reo Hiwatashi, & Hayato Tsubo)
- January 7 & 8: Men's JS #5 in (Hungary) Budapest
  - Individual winner: (France) Remi Garrigue
  - Team winners: Italy (Edoardo Cantini, Marco Mastrullo, Emanuele Nardella, & Leonardo Tocci)
- January 21 & 22: Men's JS #6 in (Peru) Lima
  - Individual winner: (Uzbekistan) Musa Aymuratov
  - Team winners: Uzbekistan (Islambek Abdazov, Musa Aymuratov, Azizbek Dauletnazarov, & Zuhriddin Kodirov)
- February 3–5: Men's JS #7 in (Bulgaria) Plovdiv
- February 18 & 19: Men's JS #8 (final) in (France) Dourdan

Women

- November 5 & 6, 2022: Women's JS #1 in (Kazakhstan) Almaty
  - Individual winner: (South Korea) KIM Na-ae
  - Team winners: Turkey (Begüm Alkaya, Damla Demirkol, Nisanur Erbil, & Nil Gungor)
- November 19 & 20, 2022: Women's JS #2 in Tashkent
  - Individual winner: (Turkey) Nisanur Erbil
  - Team winners: Uzbekistan (Luisa Fernanda Herrera Lara, Nargiza Jaksybaeva, Gulistan Perdibaeva, & Samira Shokirova)
- December 2–4, 2022: Women's JS #3 in (Poland) Sosnowiec
  - Individual winner: (Italy) Carlotta Fusetti
  - Team winners: France (Cyrielle Girardin, Mathilde Mouroux, Toscane Tori, & Lola Tranquille)
- December 17 & 18, 2022: Women's JS #4 in (Germany) Dormagen
  - Individual winner: (United States) Magda Skarbonkiewicz
  - Team winners: United States (Tatiana Nazlymov, Kaitlyn Pak, Magda Skarbonkiewicz, & Siobhan Sullivan)
- January 7 & 8: Women's JS #5 in Budapest
  - Individual winner: (Italy) Carlotta Fusetti
  - Team winners: Hungary (Kíra Keszei, Zsanett Kovács, Viktória Zoe Pápai, & Anna Spiesz)
- January 21 & 22: Women's JS #6 in (Spain) Segovia
  - Individual winner: (Italy) Carlotta Fusetti
  - Team winners: Turkey (Begüm Alkaya, Damla Demirkol, Nisanur Erbil, & Nil Gungor)
- February 3–5: Women's JS #7 in (Bulgaria) Plovdiv
- February 18 & 19: Women's JS #8 (final) in (Georgia (country)) Batumi

== Field hockey ==
=== Hockey World Cup ===
- January 13–29: 2023 Men's FIH Hockey World Cup in (India) Bhubaneswar–Rourkela
  - (gold) Germany; (silver) Belgium; (bronze) Netherlands
- February 4–10: 2023 Men's FIH Indoor Hockey World Cup in (South Africa) Pretoria
- February 4–10: 2023 Women's FIH Indoor Hockey World Cup in (South Africa) Pretoria

=== European Hockey Federation ===
- August 18–27: 2023 Men's EuroHockey Championship in (Germany) Mönchengladbach
- August 18–27: 2023 Women's EuroHockey Championship in (Germany) Mönchengladbach

=== Indoor hockey ===
- January 13–15: 2023 Women's Indoor EuroHockey U21 Championships in (Switzerland) Lucerne
  - (gold) Austria; (silver) The Czech Republic; (bronze) Turkey
- January 19–22: 2023 Men's Indoor EuroHockey U21 Championships in (Czech Republic) Nymburk
  - (gold) Austria; (silver) Switzerland; (bronze) Poland

Clubs competitions

- September 29, 2022 – April 10: 2022–23 Men's Euro Hockey League and 2023 Women's Euro Hockey League (final8 in (Netherlands) Amstelveen)
- February 10 – 12: 2023 EuroHockey Indoor Club Challenge I in (Portugal) Lousada
- February 17 – 19: 2023 Men's EuroHockey Indoor Club Cup in (Turkey) Alanya
- February 17 – 19: 2023 EuroHockey Indoor Club Trophy in (Germany) Mannheim
- February 17 – 19: 2023 EuroHockey Indoor Women's Club Trophy in (France) Cambrai
- February 17 – 19: 2023 EuroHockey Club Indoor Women's Challenge I in (Poland) Skierniewice
- February 24 – 26: 2023 Women's EuroHockey Indoor Club Cup in (Turkey) Alanya

== Fistball ==
=== International Fistball Association (IFA) ===
- July 22–29: 2023 Fistball World Championships in (Germany) Mannheim

=== European Fistball Association (EFA) ===
- January 7 & 8: EFA 2023 Fistball U19 European Championship in Denmark
  - Men's: (gold) Germany; (silver) Austria; (bronze) Switzerland
  - Women's: (gold) Germany; (silver) Austria; (bronze) Switzerland
- January 21 & 22: EFA 2023 Fistball Men's Champions Cup Indoor in (Switzerland) Oberentfelden
  - Winners: (Germany) TSV Pfungstadt, 2nd place: (Germany) TSV Hagen 1860, 3rd place: (Switzerland) STV Oberentfelden
- January 21 & 22: EFA 2023 Fistball Women's Champions Cup Indoor in (Austria) Nußbach
  - Winners: (Germany) TSV Dennach, 2nd place: (Switzerland) SVD Diepoldsau-Schmitter, 3rd place: (Germany) TV Jahn Schneverdingen
- July 8 & 9: EFA 2023 Fistball U18 European Championship in Switzerland

== Floorball ==
- January 7–8: Champions Cup
  - Men's champion: (Sweden) IBF Falun
  - Women's champion: (Sweden) Team Thorengruppen
- April 26 – 30: 2023 Men's U-19 World Floorball Championships in (Denmark) Frederikshavn
  - Champion: Sweden
- December 2–10: 2023 Women's World Floorball Championships in Singapore City
  - Champion: Sweden

== Freestyle football ==
=== World Championships ===
- November 25: 2023 World Freestyle Football Championship in (Kenya) Nairobi
  - Winners: (Norway) Erlend Fagerli (m) / (Poland) Agnieszka Mnich (w)
- December 7: 2023 Red Bull Street Style Championship in (Belgium) Brussels
  - Winners: (Australia) Jay Hennicke (m) / (Italy) Anastasia Bagaglini (w)

== Futsal ==
=== UEFA ===
- March 17–19: UEFA Women's Futsal Euro 2023 Finals in (Hungary) Debrecen
- May 5–7: 2022–23 UEFA Futsal Champions League Finals in (Spain) Palma de Mallorca
- September 3–10: 2023 UEFA Under-19 Futsal Championship in (Croatia) Poreč

=== CONMEBOL ===
- June 17–25: 2023 South American U-17 Futsal Championship in (Paraguay) Asunción
- TBA: 2023 Copa América de Futsal (location TBA)
- TBA: 2023 Copa Libertadores de Futsal (location TBA)

=== AFC ===
- TBA: 2023 AFC U-20 Futsal Asian Cup (location TBA)
- TBA: 2023 AFC Futsal Club Championship
- TBA: 2023 AFC Futsal Asian Cup (location IRAN)

=== OFC ===
- October 1–7: 2023 OFC Futsal Cup in New Zealand

== Golf ==
=== Men's major golf championships ===
- April 6–9: 2023 Masters Tournament at Augusta National Golf Club in Augusta, Georgia
  - Winner: (Spain) Jon Rahm
- May 18–21: 2023 PGA Championship at Oak Hill Country Club in Rochester, New York
  - Winner: (United States) Brooks Koepka
- June 15–18: 2023 U.S. Open at Los Angeles Country Club in Los Angeles, California
  - Winner: (United States) Wyndham Clark
- July 20–23: 2023 Open Championship at Royal Liverpool Golf Club in Metropolitan Borough of Wirral, England
  - Winner: (United States) Brian Harman

=== Women's major golf championships (LPGA Tour) ===
- April 20–23: 2023 Chevron Championship at The Club at Carlton Woods in The Woodlands, Texas
  - Winner: (United States) Lilia Vu
- June 22–25: 2023 Women's PGA Championship at Baltusrol Golf Club in Springfield, New Jersey
  - Winner: (China) Yin Ruoning
- July 6–9: 2023 U.S. Women's Open at Pebble Beach Golf Links in Pebble Beach, California
  - Winner: (United States) Allisen Corpuz
- July 27–30: 2023 Evian Championship at Evian Resort Golf Club in Évian-les-Bains, France
  - Winner: (France) Céline Boutier
- August 10–13: 2023 Women's British Open at Walton Heath Golf Club in Surrey, England
  - Winner: (United States) Lilia Vu

=== Senior major golf championships (PGA Tour Champions) ===
- May 11–14: The Tradition at Greystone Golf & Country Club in Birmingham, Alabama
  - Winner: (United States) Steve Stricker
- May 25–28: Senior PGA Championship at Fields Ranch East in Frisco, Texas
  - Winner: (United States) Steve Stricker
- June 28 – July 2: U.S. Senior Open at SentryWorld Stevens Point, Wisconsin
  - Winner: (Germany) Bernhard Langer
- July 13–16: Senior Players Championship at Firestone Country Club in Akron, Ohio
  - Winner: (United States) Steve Stricker
- July 27–30: 2023 Senior Open Championship at Royal Porthcawl Golf Club in Porthcawl, Wales
  - Winner: (Germany) Alex Čejka

== Gymnastics ==
=== Gymnastics World Championships ===
- March 29 – April 2: 2023 Junior World Artistic Gymnastics Championships in (Turkey) Antalya
- August 23–27: 2023 Rhythmic Gymnastics World Championships in (Spain) Valencia
- September 30 – October 8: 2023 Artistic Gymnastics World Championships in (Belgium) Antwerp
- November 9–12: 2023 Trampoline Gymnastics World Championships in (United Kingdom) Birmingham

=== 2023 FIG Artistic Gymnastics World Cup series ===
- February 23–26: AG World Cup #1 in (Germany) Cottbus
- March 1–4: AG World Cup #2 in (Qatar) Doha
- March 9–12: AG World Cup #3 in (Azerbaijan) Baku
- March 15–18: AG World Cup #4 (final) in (Egypt) Cairo

=== 2023 FIG Artistic Gymnastics World Challenge Cup series ===
- May 25–28: AGWCC #1 in (Bulgaria) Varna
- June 1–4: AGWCC #2 in (Israel) Tel Aviv
- June 8–11: AGWCC #3 in (Croatia) Osijek
- September 1–3: AGWCC #4 in (Turkey) Mersin
- September 8–10: AGWCC #5 in (Hungary) Szombathely
- September 16 & 17: AGWCC #6 (final) in (France) Paris

=== 2023 FIG Rhythmic Gymnastics World Cup series ===
- March 17–19: RG World Cup #1 in (Greece) Athens
- March 24–26: RG World Cup #2 in (Italy) Pesaro
- March 31 – April 2: RG World Cup #3 in (Bulgaria) Sofia
- April 14–16: RG World Cup #4 in (Uzbekistan) Tashkent
- April 21–23: RG World Cup #5 (final) in (Azerbaijan) Baku

=== 2023 FIG Rhythmic Gymnastics World Challenge Cup series ===
- May 5–7: RGWCC #1 in (Portugal) Portimão
- August 11–13: RGWCC #2 (final) in (Romania) Cluj-Napoca

=== Trampoline, Tumbling, & DMT World Cup ===
- February 18 & 19: TT World Cup #1 in (Azerbaijan) Baku
- July 1 & 2: TT World Cup #2 in (Portugal) Santarém
- July 7 & 8: TT World Cup #3 in (Portugal) Coimbra
- October 7 & 8: TT World Cup #4 (final) in (Bulgaria) Varna

== Handball ==
=== IHF Championships ===
- 11–29 January: 2023 World Men's Handball Championship in Poland and Sweden
- 30 November – 17 December: 2023 World Women's Handball Championship in Denmark, Norway and Sweden

=== EHF ===
Club competitions

== Horse racing ==
=== United States ===
- May 6: Kentucky Derby at Churchill Downs
- May 20: Preakness Stakes at (Maryland) Pimlico
- June 10: Belmont Stakes at (New York (state)) Belmont Park
- November 3–4: Breeders Cup at (California) Santa Anita Park

== Judo ==
=== World & Other championships ===
- May 7–14: 2023 World Judo Championships in (Qatar) Doha
- August 4–6: 2023 Judo World Masters in (Hungary) Budapest
- August 23–27: 2023 World Judo Cadets Championships in (Croatia) Zagreb
- August 29 & 30: 2024 Summer Olympics Test Event in (France) Paris
- October 4–8: 2023 World Judo Juniors Championships in (Portugal) Coimbra

=== Continental championships ===
- July 1: 2023 European Mixed Team Judo Championships in (Poland) Kraków
- September 8 & 9: 2023 African Judo Championships in Morocco (location TBA)
- September 15–17: 2023 Pan American-Oceania Judo Championships in (Canada) Calgary
- November 3–5: 2023 European Judo Championships in (France) Montpellier

=== Judo Grand Slam ===
- February 4 & 5: JGS #1 in (France) Paris
- February 17–19: JGS #2 in (Israel) Tel Aviv
- March 3–5: JGS #3 in (Uzbekistan) Tashkent
- March 24–26: JGS #4 in (Georgia (country)) Tbilisi
- March 31 – April 2: JGS #5 in (Turkey) Antalya
- June 23–25: JGS #6 in (Mongolia) Ulaanbaatar
- September 22–24: JGS #7 in (Azerbaijan) Baku
- October 20–22: JGS #8 in (United Arab Emirates) Abu Dhabi
- December 2 & 3: JGS #9 (final) in (Japan) Tokyo

=== Judo Grand Prix ===
- January 27–29: JGP #1 in (Portugal) Almada
- August 18–20: JGP #2 (final) in (Croatia) Zagreb

== See also ==
- 2023 in sports
  - 2023 in sports (A)
  - 2023 in sports (B)
  - 2023 in sports (K–S)
  - 2023 in sports (T–Z)
