= Tom Van Asbroeck =

Belgian road cyclist (born 1990)

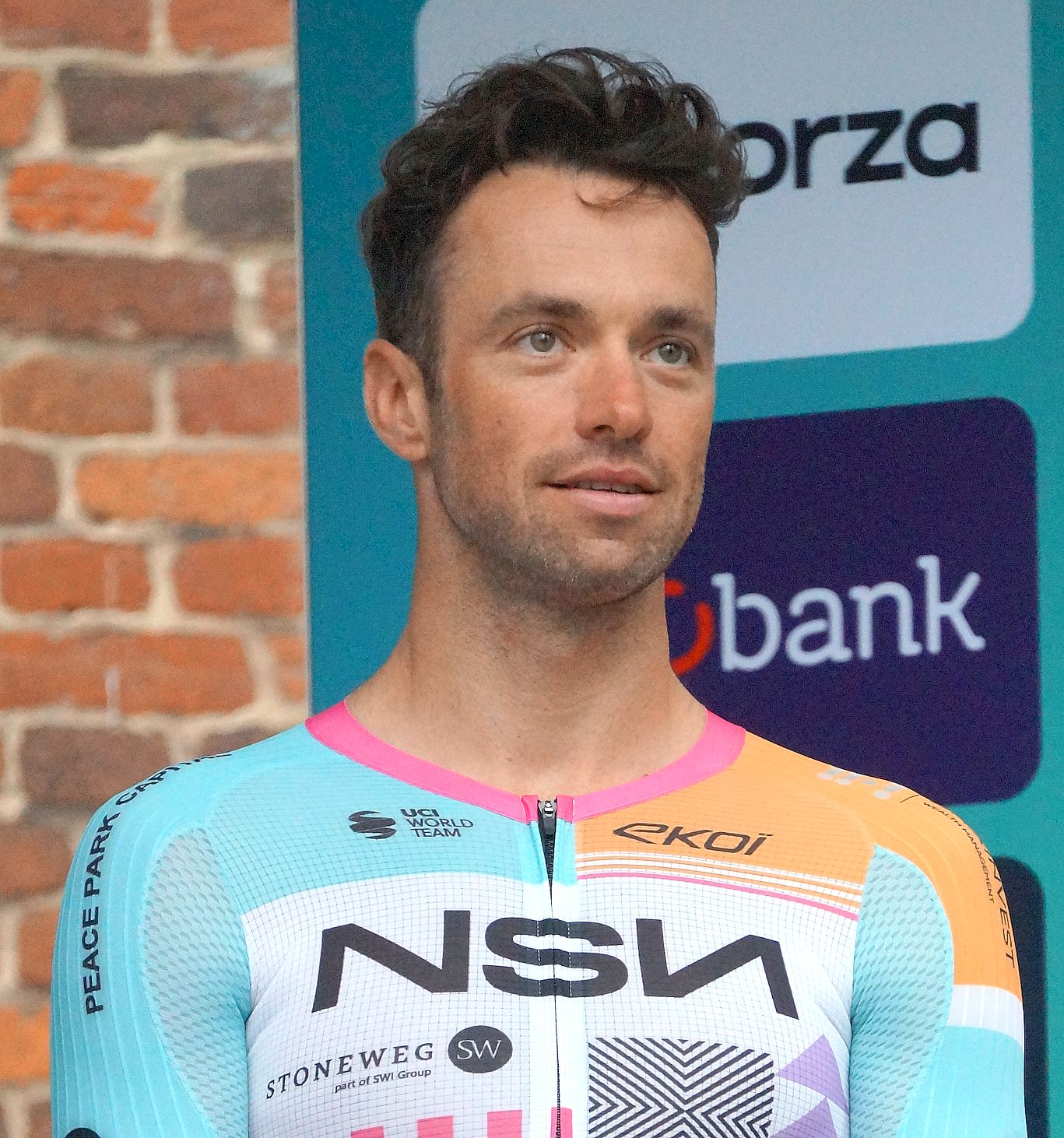
- Van Asbroeck in 2026

Personal information
- Full name: Tom Van Asbroeck
- Born: April 19, 1990 (age 36) Aalst, Flanders, Belgium
- Height: 1.82 m (6 ft 0 in)
- Weight: 69 kg (152 lb)

Cycling career
- Sport: Cycling
- Current team: NSN Cycling Team
- Discipline: Road
- Role: Rider

Professional teams
- 2012–2014: Topsport Vlaanderen–Mercator
- 2015–2016: LottoNL–Jumbo
- 2017–2018: Cannondale–Drapac
- 2019–: Israel Cycling Academy

Major wins
- Other UCI Europe Tour (2014)
Medal record
Representing Belgium
Men's road bicycle racing
World Championships
Bronze medal – third place	2012 Valkenburg	Under-23 road race

Tom Van Asbroeck (born 19 April 1990) is a Belgian cyclist, who currently rides for UCI ProTeam NSN Cycling Team. He was previously a member of the Topsport Vlaanderen–Baloise team, between 2012 and 2014. He was named in the start list for the 2015 Vuelta a España. In May 2018, he was named in the startlist for the Giro d'Italia. In August 2020, he was named in the startlist for the 2020 Tour de France.

== Major results ==
2011
1st Omloop Het Nieuwsblad U23
3rd Grand Prix de Waregem
3rd Gilbert Memorial Letêcheur Rochefort
10th Omloop van het Waasland
2012
1st Beverbeek Classic
1st Grote Prijs Stad Geel
3rd Road race, UCI Road World Under-23 Championships
7th Ronde van Drenthe
9th Classic Loire Atlantique
9th Internationale Wielertrofee Jong Maar Moedig
10th Dwars door Drenthe
2013
1st Grote Prijs Jean-Pierre Monseré
4th Châteauroux Classic
6th Overall Arctic Race of Norway
8th Druivenkoers Overijse
9th Overall Tour des Fjords
9th Halle–Ingooigem
2014 (2 pro wins)
1st Cholet-Pays de Loire
1st Grote Prijs Beeckman-De Caluwé
1st Mountains classification, Vuelta a Andalucía
2nd Nokere Koerse
2nd Grand Prix de la Somme
2nd Grand Prix de Fourmies
2nd Grote Prijs Jef Scherens
2nd Gooikse Pijl
2nd Nationale Sluitingsprijs
3rd Druivenkoers Overijse
3rd Münsterland Giro
4th Overall Tour de Wallonie

1st Stage 4

4th Grand Prix Pino Cerami
4th Arnhem–Veenendaal Classic
4th Grand Prix d'Isbergues
6th Overall Boucles de la Mayenne

1st Points classification

6th Gent–Wevelgem
7th Dwars door Vlaanderen
7th Omloop van het Houtland
9th Grand Prix de Denain
10th Kampioenschap van Vlaanderen
2015
2nd Nationale Sluitingsprijs
3rd Binche–Chimay–Binche
4th Kuurne–Brussels–Kuurne
4th Halle–Ingooigem
6th Omloop van het Houtland
2016 (1)
Tour du Poitou Charentes

1st Points classification
1st Stage 2

1st Mountains classification, Arctic Race of Norway
4th Grand Prix Impanis-Van Petegem
5th Grote Prijs Jean-Pierre Monseré
2018
1st Grote Prijs Beeckman-De Caluwé
2019 (1)
1st Binche–Chimay–Binche
2nd Paris–Bourges
3rd Grand Prix La Marseillaise
3rd Druivenkoers Overijse
3rd Omloop Mandel-Leie-Schelde
4th Tour de l'Eurométropole
5th Overall Four Days of Dunkirk
7th Ronde van Limburg
8th Grote Prijs Jef Scherens
2020
7th Trofeo Campos, Porreres, Felanitx, Ses Salines
2021
4th Bredene Koksijde Classic
5th Nokere Koerse
5th Grand Prix de Denain
7th Gooikse Pijl
8th Paris–Roubaix
8th Grand Prix de Wallonie
2022
10th Gooikse Pijl
2023
6th Famenne Ardenne Classic
7th Paris–Tours
7th Trofeo Palma
8th Brussels Cycling Classic
8th Gooikse Pijl
9th Dwars door het Hageland
2024 (1)
1st Stage 4 Tour de la Provence
2nd Classic Loire Atlantique
3rd Cholet-Pays de la Loire
4th Tour of Leuven
6th Nokere Koerse
8th Paris–Tours
10th Tro-Bro Léon
10th Münsterland Giro
10th Grand Prix d'Isbergues
2025
7th Grand Prix Criquielion
2026
5th Gooikse Pijl

=== Grand Tour general classification results timeline ===
Grand Tour	2015	2016	2017	2018	2019	2020
Giro d'Italia	—	—	—	133	—	—
Tour de France	—	—	—	—	—	98
Vuelta a España	110	—	133	87	—	—

Legend
—	Did not compete
DNF	Did not finish
