= 2023 UCI ProSeries =

International road cycling contest

- Fourth edition of the UCI ProSeries

Details
- Dates: 22 January – 15 October
- Location: Asia, Europe, United States, Argentina
- Races: 57

The 2023 UCI ProSeries was the fourth season of the UCI ProSeries, the second tier road cycling tour, below the UCI World Tour, but above the various regional UCI Continental Circuits.

The calendar consisted of 57 events, of which 33 were one-day races (1.Pro), and 24 were stage races (2.Pro). There were 49 events in Europe, six in Asia, one in the United States, and one in Argentina.

== Events ==
Races in the 2023 UCI ProSeries
Race	Date	Winner	Team	Ref.
(Argentina) Vuelta a San Juan	22–29 January	Miguel Ángel López (COL)	Team Medellín–EPM	
(Spain) Volta a la Comunitat Valenciana	1–5 February	Rui Costa (POR)	Intermarché–Circus–Wanty	
Tour of Oman	11–15 February	Matteo Jorgenson (USA)	Movistar Team	
(Spain) Clásica de Almería	12 February	Matteo Moschetti (ITA)	Q36.5 Pro Cycling Team	
(Portugal) Volta ao Algarve	15–19 February	Daniel Martínez (COL)	Ineos Grenadiers	
(Spain) Vuelta a Andalucía	15–19 February	Tadej Pogačar (SLO)	UAE Team Emirates	
(France) Faun-Ardèche Classic	25 February	Julian Alaphilippe (FRA)	Soudal–Quick-Step	
(France) Faun Drôme Classic	26 February	Anthony Perez (FRA)	Cofidis	
(Belgium) Kuurne–Brussels–Kuurne	26 February	Tiesj Benoot (BEL)	Team Jumbo–Visma	
(Italy) Trofeo Laigueglia	1 March	Nans Peters (FRA)	AG2R Citroën Team	
(Italy) Milano–Torino	15 March	Arvid de Kleijn (NED)	Tudor Pro Cycling Team	
(Belgium) Nokere Koerse	15 March	Tim Merlier (BEL)	Soudal–Quick-Step	
(France) GP de Denain	16 March	Juan Sebastián Molano (COL)	UAE Team Emirates	
(Belgium) Bredene Koksijde Classic	17 March	Gerben Thijssen (BEL)	Intermarché–Circus–Wanty	
(Italy) GP Industria & Artigianato	26 March	Ben Healy (IRL)	EF Education–EasyPost	
(Spain) GP Miguel Induráin	1 April	Ion Izagirre (ESP)	Cofidis	
(Belgium) Scheldeprijs	5 April	Jasper Philipsen (BEL)	Alpecin–Deceuninck	
(Belgium) Brabantse Pijl	12 April	Dorian Godon (FRA)	AG2R Citroën Team	
(Italy) Tour of the Alps	17–21 April	Tao Geoghegan Hart (GBR)	Ineos Grenadiers	
(France) GP du Morbihan	6 May	Arnaud De Lie (BEL)	Lotto–Dstny	
(France) Tro-Bro Léon	7 May	Giacomo Nizzolo (ITA)	Israel–Premier Tech	
(Hungary) Tour de Hongrie	10–14 May	Marc Hirschi (SUI)	UAE Team Emirates	
(France) Four Days of Dunkirk	16–21 May	Romain Grégoire (FRA)	Groupama–FDJ	
(France) Boucles de la Mayenne	25–28 May	Oier Lazkano (ESP)	Movistar Team	
Tour of Norway	26–29 May	Ben Tulett (GBR)	Ineos Grenadiers	
(Belgium) Brussels Cycling Classic	4 June	Arnaud Démare (FRA)	Groupama–FDJ	
(Netherlands) ZLM Tour	7–11 June	Olav Kooij (NED)	Team Jumbo–Visma	
(Belgium) Dwars door het Hageland	10 June	Rasmus Tiller (NOR)	Uno-X Pro Cycling Team	
(France) Mont Ventoux Dénivelé Challenge	13 June	Lenny Martinez (FRA)	Groupama–FDJ	
Tour of Belgium	14–18 June	Mathieu van der Poel (NED)	Alpecin–Deceuninck	
Tour of Slovenia	14–18 June	Filippo Zana (ITA)	Team Jayco–AlUla	
(China) Tour of Qinghai Lake	9–16 July	Henok Mulubrhan (ERI)	Green Project–Bardiani–CSF–Faizanè	
(Belgium) Tour de Wallonie	22–26 July	Filippo Ganna (ITA)	Ineos Grenadiers	
(Spain) Vuelta a Burgos	15–19 August	Primož Roglič (SLO)	Team Jumbo–Visma	
(Denmark) Danmark Rundt	15–19 August	Mads Pedersen (DEN)	Lidl–Trek	
Arctic Race of Norway	17–20 August	Stephen Williams (GBR)	Israel–Premier Tech	
(Germany) Deutschland Tour	23–27 August	Ilan Van Wilder (BEL)	Soudal–Quick-Step	
(United States) Maryland Cycling Classic	3 September	Mattias Skjelmose (DEN)	Lidl–Trek	
(United Kingdom) Tour of Britain	3–10 September	Wout van Aert (BEL)	Team Jumbo–Visma	
(France) GP de Fourmies	10 September	Tim Merlier (BEL)	Soudal–Quick-Step	
(Belgium) GP de Wallonie	13 September	Gonzalo Serrano (ESP)	Movistar Team	
(Italy) Coppa Sabatini	14 September	Marc Hirschi (SUI)	UAE Team Emirates	
(China) Tour of Taihu Lake	14–17 September	George Jackson (NZL)	Bolton Equities Black Spoke	
(Belgium) Super 8 Classic	16 September	Mathieu van der Poel (NED)	Alpecin–Deceuninck	
Tour de Luxembourg	20–24 September	Marc Hirschi (SUI)	UAE Team Emirates	
(Malaysia) Tour de Langkawi	23–30 September	Simon Carr (GBR)	EF Education–EasyPost	
(Belgium) Circuit Franco–Belge	28 September	Arnaud De Lie (BEL)	Lotto–Dstny	
(Italy) Giro dell'Emilia	30 September	Primož Roglič (SLO)	Team Jumbo–Visma	
(Italy) Coppa Bernocchi	2 October	Wout van Aert (BEL)	Team Jumbo–Visma	
(Italy) Tre Valli Varesine	3 October	Ilan Van Wilder (BEL)	Soudal–Quick-Step	
(Germany) Münsterland Giro	3 October	Per Strand Hagenes (NOR)	Team Jumbo–Visma	
(Italy) Gran Piemonte	5 October	Andrea Bagioli (ITA)	Soudal–Quick-Step	
(China) Tour of Hainan	5–9 October	Óscar Sevilla (ESP)	Team Medellín–EPM	
(France) Paris–Tours	8 October	Riley Sheehan (USA)	Israel–Premier Tech	
(Italy) Giro del Veneto	11 October	Dorian Godon (FRA)	AG2R Citroën Team	
Japan Cup	15 October	Rui Costa (POR)	Intermarché–Circus–Wanty	
(Italy) Veneto Classic	15 October	Davide Formolo (ITA)	UAE Team Emirates	
