= Alex Aranburu =

Spanish cyclist (born 1995)

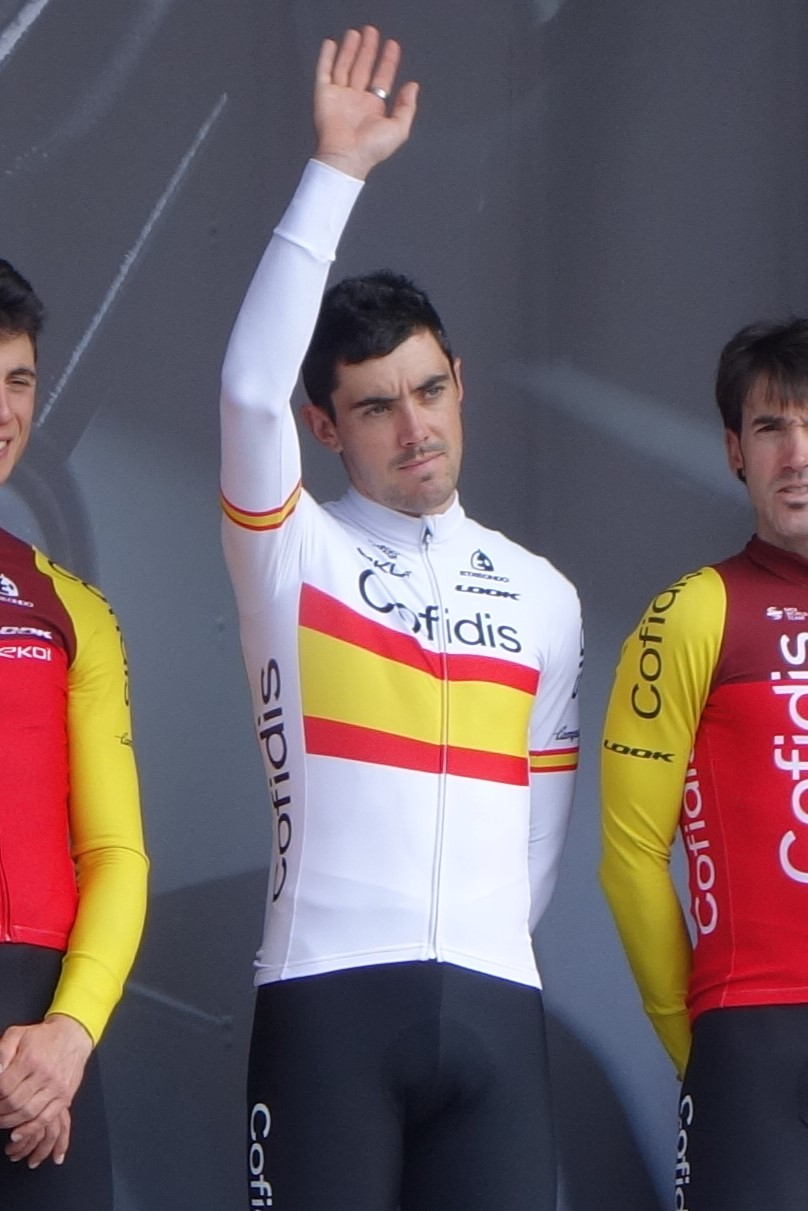
- Aranburu in 2025

Personal information
- Full name: Alexander Aranburu Deba
- Born: 19 September 1995 (age 31) Ezkio-Itsaso, Spain
- Height: 1.78 m (5 ft 10 in)
- Weight: 63 kg (139 lb)

Cycling career
- Sport: Cycling
- Current team: Cofidis
- Discipline: Road
- Role: Rider
- Rider type: Puncheur

Amateur teams
- 2014: Ampo–Goierriko TB
- 2015: Café Baqué–Conservas Campos
- 2015: Murias Taldea (stagiaire)

Professional teams
- 2016: Euskadi Basque Country–Murias
- 2017–2019: Caja Rural–Seguros RGA
- 2020–2021: Astana
- 2022–2024: Movistar Team
- 2025–: Cofidis

Major wins
- One-day races and Classics National Road Race Championships (2024) Bretagne Classic (2026)

Alexander Aranburu Deba (born 19 September 1995 in Ezkio-Itsaso) is a Spanish cyclist, who currently rides for UCI WorldTeam Cofidis. He has completed the Vuelta a España three times in his career, and has twice completed the Tour de France.

== Major results ==
2016
8th Circuito de Getxo
2017
7th Overall Tour du Gévaudan Languedoc-Roussillon
9th Trofeo Pollenca–Port de Andratx
2018 (1 pro win)
1st Circuito de Getxo
5th Overall Tour of Norway
10th Overall Vuelta a Castilla y León
Combativity award Stage 7 Vuelta a España
2019 (2)
Vuelta a Burgos

1st Points classification
1st Stage 4

2nd Circuito de Getxo
4th Overall Vuelta a la Comunidad de Madrid

1st Stage 2

Combativity award Stage 11 Vuelta a España
2020
2nd Gran Trittico Lombardo
6th Gran Piemonte
7th Milan–San Remo
2021 (1)
1st Stage 2 Tour of the Basque Country
3rd Road race, National Road Championships
3rd Memorial Marco Pantani
6th Omloop Het Nieuwsblad
7th Milan–San Remo
2022 (2)
1st Overall Tour du Limousin

1st Stage 2

3rd Road race, National Road Championships
3rd Overall Boucles de la Mayenne
6th Circuito de Getxo
6th Giro della Toscana
2023
3rd Road race, National Road Championships
3rd Grand Prix Cycliste de Montréal
3rd Gran Piemonte
4th Grand Prix Cycliste de Québec
5th Overall Deutschland Tour
6th GP Miguel Induráin
7th Clásica de San Sebastián
9th Overall Volta a la Comunitat Valenciana
2024 (2)
1st Road race, National Road Championships
1st Points classification, Tour of the Basque Country
2nd Eschborn–Frankfurt
2nd Grand Prix de Wallonie
3rd Overall Tour of Belgium

1st Stage 4

3rd Gran Piemonte
3rd Gran Premio Castellón
4th Trofeo Calvià
4th Coppa Agostoni
2025 (1)
3rd Circuito de Getxo
4th Brabantse Pijl
5th GP Miguel Induráin
7th Overall Tour of the Basque Country

1st Stage 3

8th Grand Prix Cycliste de Montréal
8th Trofeo Calvià
8th Tour du Finistère
9th Grand Prix de Wallonie
2026 (3)
1st Bretagne Classic
1st Stage 4 Tour of the Basque Country
2nd Overall Tour du Limousin
2nd Figueira Champions Classic
3rd Overall Tour of Belgium

1st Stage 3

3rd Circuito de Getxo
3rd Polynormande
4th GP Miguel Induráin
5th Coppa Sabatini
6th Overall Vuelta a Andalucía

1st Points classification

8th La Drôme Classic

=== Grand Tour general classification results timeline ===
Grand Tour	2018	2019	2020	2021	2022	2023	2024	2025	2026
Giro d'Italia	—	—	—	—	—	—	—	—	—
Tour de France	—	—	—	74	—	52	71	81	85
Vuelta a España	108	94	75	DNF	—	—	—	—	—

=== Classics results timeline ===
Monument	2018	2019	2020	2021	2022	2023	2024	2025	2026
Milan–San Remo	—	—	7	7	13	26	—	15	12
Tour of Flanders	—	—	—	—	20	—	—	—	—
Paris–Roubaix	—	—	NH	—	—	—	—	—	—
Liège–Bastogne–Liège	—	—	—	21	—	71	—	15	—
Giro di Lombardia	—	—	81	—	—	—	—	55	—
Classic	2018	2019	2020	2021	2022	2023	2024	2025	2026
Omloop Het Nieuwsblad	—	—	DNF	6	13	—	—	—	—
Strade Bianche	—	—	—	22	—	16	—	75	—
E3 Saxo Bank Classic	—	—	NH	—	30	—	—	—	—
Brabantse Pijl	—	—	—	—	—	—	—	4	—
Amstel Gold Race	—	—	NH	11	19	31	113	DNF	16
La Flèche Wallonne	—	—	—	13	—	13	DNF	46	14
Eschborn–Frankfurt	—	—	—	NH	—	—	2	18	—
Clásica de San Sebastián	22	39	NH	—	DNF	7	54	23	58
Bretagne Classic	—	—	44	—	12	16	29	25	1
Grand Prix Cycliste de Québec	—	—	Not held		55	4	37	24	
Grand Prix Cycliste de Montréal	—	—	Not held		22	3	15	8	
Gran Piemonte	—	—	6	14	—	3	3	19	

Legend
—	Did not compete
DNF	Did not finish
