= 2023 La Drôme Classic =

2023 UCI ProSeries

Race details
- Dates: 26 February 2023
- Stages: 1
- Distance: 191.5 km (119.0 mi)
- Winning time: 4h 57' 26"

Results
	Winner	Anthony Perez (FRA)	(Cofidis)
	Second	Rui Costa (POR)	(Intermarché–Circus–Wanty)
	Third	Andrea Bagioli (ITA)	(Soudal–Quick-Step)

The 2023 La Drôme Classic, officially the Faun Drôme Classic due to sponsorships, was the tenth edition of the Drôme Classic cycle race. It was held on 26 February 2022 as a category 1.Pro race on the 2023 UCI ProSeries. The race started and finished in Étoile-sur-Rhône and featured several climbs throughout. It formed a pair of races on the same weekend with the 2023 Faun-Ardèche Classic, held on the previous day.

== Teams ==
Thirteen of the eighteen UCI WorldTeams, six UCI ProTeams, and two UCI Continental teams made up the twenty-one teams that participated in the race, with a total of 147 riders, of which 72 finished the race.

UCI WorldTeams

- AG2R Citroën Team
- Arkéa–Samsic
- Astana Qazaqstan Team
- Bora–Hansgrohe
- Cofidis
- EF Education–EasyPost
- Groupama–FDJ
- Intermarché–Circus–Wanty
- Soudal–Quick-Step
- Team DSM
- Team Jayco–AlUla
- Trek–Segafredo
- UAE Team Emirates

UCI ProTeams

- Bingoal WB
- Israel–Premier Tech
- Lotto–Dstny
- Team TotalEnergies
- Tudor Pro Cycling Team
- Uno-X Pro Cycling Team

UCI Continental Teams

- CIC U Nantes Atlantique
- St. Michel–Mavic–Auber93

== Result ==
Result
Rank	Rider	Team	Time
1	Anthony Perez (FRA)	Cofidis	4h 57' 26"
2	Rui Costa (POR)	Intermarché–Circus–Wanty	+ 1' 11"
3	Andrea Bagioli (ITA)	Soudal–Quick-Step	+ 1' 11"
4	David Gaudu (FRA)	Groupama–FDJ	+ 1' 13"
5	Quinn Simmons (USA)	Trek–Segafredo	+ 1' 13"
6	Mattias Skjelmose Jensen (DEN)	Trek–Segafredo	+ 1' 34"
7	Georg Zimmermann (GER)	Intermarché–Circus–Wanty	+ 1' 38"
8	Simon Clarke (AUS)	Israel–Premier Tech	+ 1' 41"
9	Corbin Strong (NZL)	Israel–Premier Tech	+ 1' 43"
10	Dorian Godon (FRA)	AG2R Citroën Team	+ 1' 48"
