= 2025 Grand Prix de Wallonie =

2025 UCI ProSeries
- Event poster with previous winners Roger Adrià and Karlijn Swinkels

Race details
- Dates: 17 September 2025
- Stages: 1
- Distance: 187.1 km (116.3 mi)
- Winning time: 4h 30' 15"

Results
	Winner	Arnaud De Lie (BEL)	(Lotto)
	Second	Emilien Jeannière (FRA)	(Team TotalEnergies)
	Third	Biniam Girmay (ERI)	(Intermarché–Wanty)

The 2025 Grand Prix de Wallonie was the 65th edition of the Grand Prix de Wallonie road cycling one day race, which was held on 17 September 2025 as part of the 2025 UCI ProSeries calendar.

== Teams ==
Eleven UCI WorldTeams, eight UCI ProTeams, and three UCI Continental teams made up the twenty-two teams that participated in the race.

UCI WorldTeams

- Alpecin–Deceuninck
- Arkéa–B&B Hotels
- Cofidis
- Decathlon–AG2R La Mondiale
- Ineos Grenadiers
- Intermarché–Wanty
- Movistar Team
- Red Bull–Bora–Hansgrohe
- Team Bahrain Victorious
- UAE Team Emirates XRG
- XDS Astana Team

UCI ProTeams

- Israel–Premier Tech
- Lotto
- Team Flanders–Baloise
- Team Polti VisitMalta
- Team TotalEnergies
- Tudor Pro Cycling Team
- Uno-X Mobility
- Wagner Bazin WB

UCI Continental Teams

- BEAT Cycling Club
- Tarteletto–Isorex
- Van Rysel–Roubaix

== Result ==
Result
Rank	Rider	Team	Time
1	Arnaud De Lie (BEL)	Lotto	4h 30' 15"
2	Emilien Jeannière (FRA)	Team TotalEnergies	+ 0"
3	Biniam Girmay (ERI)	Intermarché–Wanty	+ 0"
4	Roger Adrià (ESP)	Red Bull–Bora–Hansgrohe	+ 0"
5	Matteo Trentin (ITA)	Tudor Pro Cycling Team	+ 0"
6	Timo Kielich (BEL)	Alpecin–Deceuninck	+ 0"
7	Yevgeniy Fedorov (KAZ)	XDS Astana Team	+ 0"
8	Natnael Tesfatsion (ERI)	Movistar Team	+ 0"
9	Alex Aranburu (ESP)	Cofidis	+ 0"
10	Paul Lapeira (FRA)	Decathlon–AG2R La Mondiale	+ 0"
