= 2024 Tro-Bro Léon =

2024 UCI ProSeries

Race details
- Dates: 5 May 2024
- Stages: 1
- Distance: 203.6 km (126.5 mi)
- Winning time: 4h 55' 23"

Results
	Winner	Arnaud De Lie (BEL)	(Lotto–Dstny)
	Second	Clément Venturini (FRA)	(Arkéa–B&B Hotels)
	Third	Pierre Gautherat (FRA)	(Decathlon–AG2R La Mondiale)

The 2024 Tro-Bro Léon was the 40th edition of Tro-Bro Léon, a one-day road cycling race in and around Lannilis, in the northwestern French region of Brittany, that took place on 5 May 2024.

== Teams ==
Six of the eighteen UCI WorldTeams, ten UCI ProTeams, and four UCI Continental teams made up the 20 teams that participated in the race.

UCI WorldTeams

- Arkéa–B&B Hotels
- Cofidis
- Decathlon–AG2R La Mondiale
- Groupama–FDJ
- Intermarché–Wanty
- Team dsm–firmenich PostNL

UCI ProTeams

- Bingoal WB
- Burgos BH
- Caja Rural–Seguros RGA
- Equipo Kern Pharma
- Euskaltel–Euskadi
- Israel–Premier Tech
- Lotto–Dstny
- Q36.5 Pro Cycling Team
- Team TotalEnergies
- Uno-X Mobility

UCI Continental Teams

- CIC U Nantes Atlantique
- Nice Métropole Côte d'Azur
- St. Michel–Mavic–Auber93
- Van Rysel–Roubaix

== Result ==
Result
Rank	Rider	Team	Time
1	Arnaud De Lie (BEL)	Lotto–Dstny	4h 55' 23"
2	Clément Venturini (FRA)	Arkéa–B&B Hotels	+ 0"
3	Pierre Gautherat (FRA)	Decathlon–AG2R La Mondiale	+ 0"
4	Riley Sheehan (USA)	Israel–Premier Tech	+ 0"
5	Jonas Abrahamsen (NOR)	Uno-X Mobility	+ 0"
6	Morné Van Niekerk (RSA)	St. Michel–Mavic–Auber93	+ 0"
7	Luca Mozzato (ITA)	Arkéa–B&B Hotels	+ 0"
8	Thomas Gachignard (FRA)	Team TotalEnergies	+ 0"
9	Markus Hoelgaard (NOR)	Uno-X Mobility	+ 8"
10	Tom Van Asbroeck (BEL)	Israel–Premier Tech	+ 49"
