= 2025 Super 8 Classic =

2025 UCI ProSeries
- Event poster with previous winner Filippo Baroncini

Race details
- Dates: 20 September 2024
- Stages: 1
- Distance: 200.7 km (124.7 mi)
- Winning time: 4h 14' 17"

Results
	Winner	Arnaud De Lie (BEL)	(Lotto)
	Second	Matthew Brennan (GBR)	(Visma–Lease a Bike)
	Third	Jordi Meeus (BEL)	(Red Bull–Bora–Hansgrohe)

The 2025 Super 8 Classic (also known as the Grand Prix Impanis-Van Petegem) was the 27th edition of the Super 8 Classic road cycling one day race, which was held on 20 September 2024 as part of the 2025 UCI ProSeries calendar. The race was won by Arnaud De Lie of Lotto–Intermarché in a reduced bunch sprint.

== Teams ==
Sixteen UCI WorldTeams, seven UCI ProTeams and two UCI Continental teams made up the twenty-five teams that participated in the race.

UCI WorldTeams

- Alpecin–Deceuninck
- Arkéa–B&B Hotels
- Cofidis
- Groupama–FDJ
- INEOS Grenadiers
- Intermarché–Wanty
- Lidl–Trek
- Movistar Team
- Red Bull–Bora–Hansgrohe
- Soudal–Quick-Step
- Team Bahrain Victorious
- Team Picnic–PostNL
- Team Jayco–AlUla
- UAE Team Emirates XRG
- Visma–Lease a Bike
- XDS Astana Team

UCI ProTeams

- Israel–Premier Tech
- Lotto
- Team Flanders–Baloise
- Team TotalEnergies
- Tudor Pro Cycling Team
- Uno-X Mobility
- Wagner Bazin WB

UCI Continental Teams

- Pauwels Sauzen–Cibel Clementines
- Tarteletto–Isorex

== Results ==
Result
Rank	Rider	Team	Time
1	Arnaud De Lie (BEL)	Lotto	4h 14' 17"
2	Matthew Brennan (GBR)	Visma–Lease a Bike	+ 0"
3	Jordi Meeus (BEL)	Red Bull–Bora–Hansgrohe	+ 0"
4	Ben Swift (GBR)	INEOS Grenadiers	+ 0"
5	Mike Teunissen (NED)	XDS Astana Team	+ 0"
6	Matteo Trentin (ITA)	Tudor Pro Cycling Team	+ 0"
7	Quinten Hermans (BEL)	Alpecin–Deceuninck	+ 0"
8	Vlad Van Mechelen (BEL)	Team Bahrain Victorious	+ 0"
9	Alexandre Delettre (FRA)	Team TotalEnergies	+ 0"
10	Riley Sheehan (USA)	Israel–Premier Tech	+ 0"
