= 2023 Brussels Cycling Classic =

2023 UCI ProSeries
- Event poster with previous winner Taco van der Hoorn

Race details
- Dates: 4 June 2023
- Stages: 1
- Distance: 207.1 km (128.7 mi)
- Winning time: 4h 41' 51"

Results
	Winner	Arnaud Démare (FRA)	(Groupama–FDJ)
	Second	Tobias Lund Andresen (DEN)	(Team DSM)
	Third	Jordi Meeus (BEL)	(Bora–Hansgrohe)

The 2023 Brussels Cycling Classic was the 103rd edition of the Brussels Cycling Classic road cycling one day race. It was held on 4 June 2023 as part of the 2023 UCI ProSeries calendar.

== Teams ==
Ten UCI WorldTeams and ten UCI ProTeams made up the twenty teams that participated in the race.

UCI WorldTeams

- AG2R Citroën Team
- Alpecin–Deceuninck
- Arkéa–Samsic
- Bora–Hansgrohe
- Cofidis
- Groupama–FDJ
- Intermarché–Circus–Wanty
- Soudal–Quick-Step
- Team DSM
- Team Jayco–AlUla

UCI ProTeams

- Bingoal WB
- Bolton Equities Black Spoke
- Human Powered Health
- Israel–Premier Tech
- Lotto–Dstny
- Q36.5 Pro Cycling Team
- Team Corratec–Selle Italia
- Team Flanders–Baloise
- Team TotalEnergies
- Uno-X Pro Cycling Team

== Result ==
Result
Rank	Rider	Team	Time
1	Arnaud Démare (FRA)	Groupama–FDJ	4h 41' 51"
2	Tobias Lund Andresen (DEN)	Team DSM	+ 0"
3	Jordi Meeus (BEL)	Bora–Hansgrohe	+ 0"
4	Biniam Girmay (ERI)	Intermarché–Circus–Wanty	+ 0"
5	Dries Van Gestel (BEL)	Team TotalEnergies	+ 0"
6	Clément Venturini (FRA)	AG2R Citroën Team	+ 0"
7	Matis Louvel (FRA)	Arkéa–Samsic	+ 0"
8	Tom Van Asbroeck (BEL)	Israel–Premier Tech	+ 0"
9	Cédric Beullens (BEL)	Lotto–Dstny	+ 0"
10	Derek Gee (CAN)	Israel–Premier Tech	+ 0"
