= 2023 Circuit Franco-Belge =

2023 Circuit Franco–Belge
2023 UCI ProSeries
- Event poster

Race details
- Dates: 28 September 2023
- Stages: 1
- Distance: 190.6 km (118.4 mi)
- Winning time: 4h 27' 52"

Results
	Winner	Arnaud De Lie (BEL)	(Lotto–Dstny)
	Second	Rasmus Tiller (NOR)	(Uno-X Pro Cycling Team)
	Third	Corbin Strong (NZL)	(Israel–Premier Tech)

The 2023 Circuit Franco-Belge was the 82nd edition of the Eurométropole Tour and the seventh edition since it became a one day race. It was held on 28 September 2023 as part of the 2023 UCI ProSeries calendar.

== Teams ==
Seven UCI WorldTeams, nine UCI ProTeams, and four UCI Continental teams made up the 20 teams that participated in the race.

UCI WorldTeams

- Alpecin–Deceuninck
- AG2R Citroën Team
- Arkéa–Samsic
- Cofidis
- Intermarché–Circus–Wanty
- Lidl–Trek
- Soudal–Quick-Step

UCI ProTeams

- Bingoal WB
- Bolton Equities Black Spoke
- Human Powered Health
- Israel–Premier Tech
- Lotto–Dstny
- Q36.5 Pro Cycling Team
- Team Flanders–Baloise
- Team TotalEnergies
- Uno-X Pro Cycling Team

UCI Continental Teams

- ABLOC CT
- Matériel-vélo.com
- Van Rysel–Roubaix–Lille Métropole
- VolkerWessels Cycling Team

== Result ==
Result
Rank	Rider	Team	Time
1	Arnaud De Lie (BEL)	Lotto–Dstny	4h 27' 52"
2	Rasmus Tiller (NOR)	Uno-X Pro Cycling Team	+ 0"
3	Corbin Strong (NZL)	Israel–Premier Tech	+ 0"
4	Tobias Halland Johannessen (NOR)	Uno-X Pro Cycling Team	+ 2"
5	Florian Sénéchal (FRA)	Soudal–Quick-Step	+ 2"
6	Lorenzo Rota (ITA)	Intermarché–Circus–Wanty	+ 6"
7	Georg Zimmermann (GER)	Intermarché–Circus–Wanty	+ 6"
8	Yves Lampaert (BEL)	Soudal–Quick-Step	+ 8"
9	Toms Skujiņš (LAT)	Lidl–Trek	+ 9"
10	Anthony Turgis (FRA)	Team TotalEnergies	+ 13"
