= 2023 Tro-Bro Léon =

2023 UCI ProSeries

Race details
- Dates: 7 May 2023
- Stages: 1
- Distance: 204.1 km (126.8 mi)
- Winning time: 4h 50' 52"

Results
	Winner	Giacomo Nizzolo (ITA)	(Israel–Premier Tech)
	Second	Arnaud De Lie (BEL)	(Lotto–Dstny)
	Third	Nils Eekhoff (NED)	(Team DSM)

The 2023 Tro-Bro Léon was the 39th edition of Tro-Bro Léon, a one-day road cycling race in and around Lannilis, in the northwestern French region of Brittany, that took place on 7 May 2023.

== Teams ==
Six of the eighteen UCI WorldTeams, thirteen UCI ProTeams, and three UCI Continental teams made up the 22 teams that participated in the race.

UCI WorldTeams

- AG2R Citroën Team
- Arkéa–Samsic
- Cofidis
- Groupama–FDJ
- Intermarché–Circus–Wanty
- Team DSM

UCI ProTeams

- Bingoal WB
- Bolton Equities Black Spoke
- Burgos BH
- Caja Rural–Seguros RGA
- Equipo Kern Pharma
- Euskaltel–Euskadi
- Human Powered Health
- Israel–Premier Tech
- Lotto–Dstny
- Q36.5 Pro Cycling Team
- Team Flanders–Baloise
- Team TotalEnergies
- Uno-X Pro Cycling Team

UCI Continental Teams

- CIC U Nantes Atlantique
- Nice Métropole Côte d'Azur
- St. Michel–Mavic–Auber93

== Result ==
Result
Rank	Rider	Team	Time
1	Giacomo Nizzolo (ITA)	Israel–Premier Tech	4h 50' 52"
2	Arnaud De Lie (BEL)	Lotto–Dstny	+ 0"
3	Nils Eekhoff (NED)	Team DSM	+ 0"
4	Eddy Finé (FRA)	Cofidis	+ 0"
5	Rasmus Tiller (NOR)	Uno-X Pro Cycling Team	+ 0"
6	Clément Venturini (FRA)	AG2R Citroën Team	+ 0"
7	Laurent Pichon (FRA)	Arkéa–Samsic	+ 0"
8	Florian Vermeersch (BEL)	Lotto–Dstny	+ 5"
9	Thomas Gachignard (FRA)	St. Michel–Mavic–Auber93	+ 5"
10	Samuel Watson (GBR)	Groupama–FDJ	+ 5"
