= 2023 Grand Prix du Morbihan =

2023 UCI ProSeries

Race details
- Dates: 6 May 2023
- Stages: 1
- Distance: 188.6 km (117.2 mi)
- Winning time: 4h 21' 59"

Results
	Winner	Arnaud De Lie (BEL)	(Lotto–Dstny)
	Second	Romain Grégoire (FRA)	(Groupama–FDJ)
	Third	Rasmus Tiller (NOR)	(Uno-X Pro Cycling Team)

The 2023 Grand Prix du Morbihan was the 46th edition of the Grand Prix du Morbihan, a one-day road cycling race held on 6 May 2023, starting from Josselin and ending in Plumelec, in the Brittany region of northwestern France.

== Teams ==
Six of the eighteen UCI WorldTeams, eleven UCI ProTeams, and three UCI Continental teams made up the 20 teams that participated in the race.

UCI WorldTeams

- AG2R Citroën Team
- Arkéa–Samsic
- Cofidis
- Groupama–FDJ
- Intermarché–Circus–Wanty
- Team DSM

UCI ProTeams

- Bingoal WB
- Bolton Equities Black Spoke
- Burgos BH
- Caja Rural–Seguros RGA
- Equipo Kern Pharma
- Euskaltel–Euskadi
- Lotto–Dstny
- Q36.5 Pro Cycling Team
- Team Flanders–Baloise
- Team TotalEnergies
- Uno-X Pro Cycling Team

UCI Continental Teams

- CIC U Nantes Atlantique
- Nice Métropole Côte d'Azur
- St. Michel–Mavic–Auber93

== Result ==
Result
Rank	Rider	Team	Time
1	Arnaud De Lie (BEL)	Lotto–Dstny	4h 21' 59"
2	Romain Grégoire (FRA)	Groupama–FDJ	+ 0"
3	Rasmus Tiller (NOR)	Uno-X Pro Cycling Team	+ 0"
4	Orluis Aular (VEN)	Caja Rural–Seguros RGA	+ 0"
5	Clément Venturini (FRA)	AG2R Citroën Team	+ 0"
6	Mathieu Burgaudeau (FRA)	Team TotalEnergies	+ 0"
7	Alessandro Fedeli (ITA)	Q36.5 Pro Cycling Team	+ 0"
8	Eddy Finé (FRA)	Cofidis	+ 0"
9	Axel Zingle (FRA)	Cofidis	+ 0"
10	Romain Cardis (FRA)	St. Michel–Mavic–Auber93	+ 0"
