= Grand Prix Impanis-Van Petegem =

Belgian one-day road cycling race

GP Impanis-Van Petegem

Race details
- Date: Late September
- Region: Flemish Brabant, Belgium
- Local name: Grote Prijs Impanis-Van Petegem (in Dutch)
- Discipline: Road
- Competition: UCI Europe Tour; UCI ProSeries
- Type: Single-day
- Web site: impanis-vanpetegem.be

History
- First edition: 1982
- Editions: 28 (as of 2026)
- First winner: Willem Peeters (BEL)
- Most wins: Wiebren Veenstra (NED) (2)
- Most recent: Henrik Pedersen (DEN)

The GP Impanis-Van Petegem (currently known as the Flandrien 0.0 Classic, and formerly Super 8 Classic) is a single-day road bicycle race held annually since 1982 in the region of Flemish Brabant, Belgium. The race was originally organized as a tribute to Raymond Impanis in and around Kampenhout and known as the GP Impanis. Between 1995 and 2004, the race was no longer organized, only to be reinstated in 2005 as a race only for juniors (under 21). In 2011, the race was again organised for professional cyclists and upgraded to a 1.2 event on the UCI Europe Tour. It was also renamed to GP Impanis-Van Petegem in honor of Peter Van Petegem. Since then, the race has started near Brakel, the birthplace of Van Petegem, and has finished close to Kampenhout, namely in Haacht. The race became a 1.1 event in 2012 and was upgraded to 1.HC in 2015.

In 2020, the race was upgraded to 1.Pro and added to the inaugural UCI ProSeries; however, the cancellation of the 2020 edition meant that the race made its UCI ProSeries debut in 2021.

== Winners ==
Year	Country	Rider	Team
1982	Belgium	Willem Peeters	
1983	Belgium	Ludo Peeters	
1984	Netherlands	Ad Wijnands	
1985	Netherlands	Jelle Nijdam	
1986	Australia	Allan Peiper	
1987	Belgium	Paul Haghedooren	
1988	Australia	Stephen Hodge	
1989	Belgium	Eric Vanderaerden	
1990	Netherlands	Wiebren Veenstra	
1991	Netherlands	Wiebren Veenstra	
1992	Netherlands	Louis de Koning	
1993	Australia	Phil Anderson	
1994	Belgium	Carlo Bomans	
1995– 2010	No race		
2011	Belgium	Sander Cordeel	Colba-Mercury
2012	Germany	André Greipel	Lotto–Belisol
2013	Belgium	Sep Vanmarcke	Belkin Pro Cycling
2014	Belgium	Greg Van Avermaet	BMC Racing Team
2015	Belgium	Sean De Bie	Lotto–Soudal
2016	Colombia	Fernando Gaviria	Etixx–Quick-Step
2017	Italy	Matteo Trentin	Quick-Step Floors
2018	Netherlands	Taco van der Hoorn	Roompot–Nederlandse Loterij
2019	Belgium	Edward Theuns	Trek–Segafredo
2020	No race due to the COVID-19 pandemic		
2021	France	Florian Sénéchal	Deceuninck–Quick-Step
2022	Belgium	Jordi Meeus	Bora–Hansgrohe
2023	Netherlands	Mathieu van der Poel	Alpecin–Deceuninck
2024	Italy	Filippo Baroncini	UAE Team Emirates
2025	Belgium	Arnaud De Lie	Lotto
2026	Denmark	Henrik Pedersen	Uno-X Mobility

=== Wins per country ===
Wins	Country
12	Belgium
7	Netherlands
3	Australia
2	Italy
1	Colombia; Denmark; France; Germany
