= 2023 Dwars door het Hageland =

Cycling race

2023 UCI ProSeries
- Event poster with previous winners Ilaria Sanguineti and Oscar Riesebeek

Race details
- Dates: 10 June 2023
- Stages: 1
- Distance: 177 km (110.0 mi)
- Winning time: 4h 09' 02"

Results
	Winner	Rasmus Tiller (NOR)	(Uno-X Pro Cycling Team)
	Second	Stan Van Tricht (BEL)	(Soudal–Quick-Step)
	Third	Florian Vermeersch (BEL)	(Lotto–Dstny)

The 2023 Dwars door het Hageland was the 18th edition of the Dwars door het Hageland road cycling one-day race, which was held on 10 June 2023 in the Belgian province of Flemish Brabant. It was a 1.Pro event on the 2023 UCI ProSeries calendar. Only 28 of the 103 riders finished the race.

== Teams ==
Five of the eighteen UCI WorldTeams, six UCI ProTeams and four UCI Continental teams made up the fifteen teams that participated in the race. All teams fielded seven riders with the exception of Alpecin–Deceuninck and Cofidis who only sent six.

UCI WorldTeams

- Alpecin–Deceuninck
- Arkéa–Samsic
- Cofidis
- Intermarché–Circus–Wanty
- Soudal–Quick-Step

UCI ProTeams

- Bolton Equities Black Spoke
- Israel–Premier Tech
- Lotto–Dstny
- Sport Vlaanderen–Baloise
- Team Novo Nordisk
- Uno-X Pro Cycling Team

UCI Continental Teams

- ABLOC CT
- Baloise–Trek Lions
- Tarteletto–Isorex
- VolkerWessels Cycling Team

== Result ==
Result
Rank	Rider	Team	Time
1	Rasmus Tiller (NOR)	Uno-X Pro Cycling Team	4h 09' 502"
2	Stan Van Tricht (BEL)	Soudal–Quick-Step	+ 0"
3	Florian Vermeersch (BEL)	Lotto–Dstny	+ 0"
4	Yves Lampaert (BEL)	Soudal–Quick-Step	+ 10"
5	Simon Clarke (AUS)	Israel–Premier Tech	+ 10"
6	Loïc Vliegen (BEL)	Intermarché–Circus–Wanty	+ 19"
7	Søren Wærenskjold (NOR)	Uno-X Pro Cycling Team	+ 26"
8	Jenthe Biermans (BEL)	Arkéa–Samsic	+ 28"
9	Tom Van Asbroeck (BEL)	Israel–Premier Tech	+ 28"
10	Matyáš Kopecký (CZE)	Team Novo Nordisk	+ 28"
