= Riley Sheehan =

American cyclist

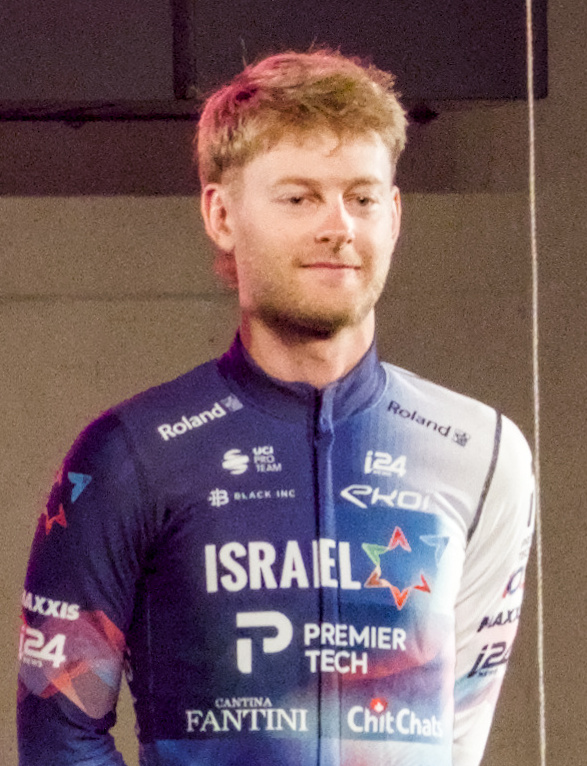
- Sheehan in 2023

Personal information
- Born: June 16, 2000 (age 26) Boulder, Colorado, United States
- Height: 1.82 m (6 ft 0 in)
- Weight: 67 kg (148 lb)

Cycling career
- Sport: Cycling
- Current team: NSN Cycling Team
- Discipline: Road
- Role: Rider
- Rider type: Classics specialist

Amateur teams
- 2020–2021: Sojasun Espoir–ACNC
- 2022: Project Echelon Racing

Professional teams
- 2019: Aevolo
- 2021: Rally Cycling (stagiaire)
- 2022: Premier Tech U-23 Cycling Project
- 2023: Denver Disruptors
- 2023: Israel–Premier Tech (stagiaire)
- 2024–: Israel–Premier Tech

Major wins
- One-day races and Classics Paris–Tours (2023)

Riley Sheehan (born June 16, 2000) is an American racing cyclist, who currently rides for UCI ProTeam NSN Cycling Team. In 2023, Sheehan became the first American cyclist to win the classic Paris–Tours. In November 2023, it was announced he signed a three-year contract with Israel–Premier Tech starting in 2024.

== Major results ==
2017
1st Overall Tour de l'Abitibi

1st Young rider classification

3rd Time trial, National Junior Road Championships
2018
1st Time trial, National Junior Road Championships
1st Overall Tour de l'Abitibi

1st Stage 4

2019
8th Chrono Kristin Armstrong
2023 (1 pro win)
1st Overall Joe Martin Stage Race

1st Mountains classification
1st Points classification
1st Stages 2 & 4

1st Paris–Tours
4th Overall Redlands Bicycle Classic
4th Overall Tucson Bicycle Classic

1st Young rider classification

6th Japan Cup
9th Maryland Cycling Classic
2024
3rd Eschborn–Frankfurt
4th Tro-Bro Léon
4th Famenne Ardenne Classic
2025
3rd Overall Deutschland Tour
4th Overall Arctic Race of Norway
6th Japan Cup
10th Super 8 Classic
2026 (2)
1st Circuit de Wallonie
1st Stage 1 Czech Tour
2nd Overall Tour de Wallonie

1st Sprints classification

4th Philadelphia Cycling Classic
9th Overall Volta a la Comunitat Valenciana
