= 2025 Bretagne Classic Ouest-France =

One-day cycling race in France

2025 Bretagne Classic CIC
2025 UCI World Tour, race 32 of 36

Race details
- Dates: 31 August 2025
- Stages: 1
- Distance: 262 km (162.8 mi)
- Winning time: 6h 21' 23"

Results
	Winner	Arnaud De Lie (BEL)	(Lotto)
	Second	Emilien Jeannière (FRA)	(Team TotalEnergies)
	Third	Olav Kooij (NED)	(Visma–Lease a Bike)

The 2025 Bretagne Classic CIC was a road cycling one-day race that took place on 31 August in the region of Brittany in northwestern France. It was the 89th edition of the Bretagne Classic and the 32nd event of the 2025 UCI World Tour.

== Teams ==
All eighteen UCI WorldTeams and seven UCI ProTeams made up the twenty-five teams that participated in the race.

UCI WorldTeams

- Alpecin–Deceuninck
- Arkéa–B&B Hotels
- Cofidis
- Decathlon–AG2R La Mondiale
- EF Education–EasyPost
- Groupama–FDJ
- Ineos Grenadiers
- Intermarché–Wanty
- Lidl–Trek
- Movistar Team
- Red Bull–Bora–Hansgrohe
- Soudal–Quick-Step
- Team Bahrain Victorious
- Team Picnic–PostNL
- Team Jayco–AlUla
- UAE Team Emirates XRG
- Visma–Lease a Bike
- XDS Astana Team

UCI ProTeams

- Euskaltel–Euskadi
- Israel–Premier Tech
- Lotto
- Team TotalEnergies
- Tudor Pro Cycling Team
- Uno-X Mobility
- VF Group–Bardiani–CSF–Faizanè

== Result ==
Result
Rank	Rider	Team	Time
1	Arnaud De Lie (BEL)	Lotto	6h 21' 23"
2	Emilien Jeannière (FRA)	Team TotalEnergies	+ 0"
3	Olav Kooij (NED)	Visma–Lease a Bike	+ 0"
4	Paul Magnier (FRA)	Soudal–Quick-Step	+ 0"
5	Biniam Girmay (ERI)	Intermarché–Wanty	+ 0"
6	Rick Pluimers (NED)	Tudor Pro Cycling Team	+ 0"
7	Dorian Godon (FRA)	Decathlon–AG2R La Mondiale	+ 0"
8	Michael Matthews (AUS)	Team Jayco–AlUla	+ 0"
9	Tobias Lund Andresen (DEN)	Team Picnic–PostNL	+ 0"
10	Jasper Stuyven (BEL)	Lidl–Trek	+ 0"
