= Arnaud De Lie =

Belgian cyclist

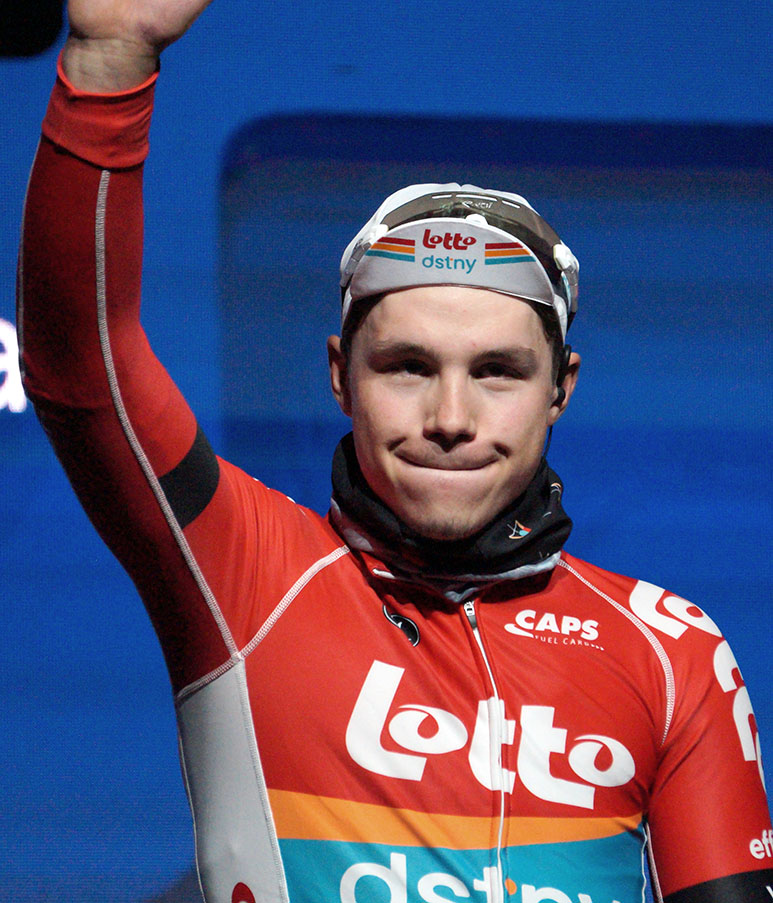
- De Lie in 2023

Personal information
- Nicknames: Le Taureau de Lescheret (The Bull from Lescheret)
- Born: 16 March 2002 (age 24) Libramont-Chevigny, Belgium
- Height: 1.82 m (6 ft 0 in)
- Weight: 77 kg (170 lb)

Cycling career
- Sport: Cycling
- Current team: Lotto–Intermarché
- Discipline: Road
- Role: Rider
- Rider type: Sprinter; Classics specialist

Amateur team
- 2021: Lotto–Soudal U23

Professional team
- 2022–: Lotto–Soudal

Major wins
- Stage races Renewi Tour (2025) Danmark Rundt (2024) One-day races and Classics National Road Race Championships (2024) Bretagne Classic (2025) GP de Québec (2023) Circuit Franco-Belge (2023) GP de Wallonie (2025) Super 8 Classic (2025) GP du Morbihan (2023) Tro-Bro Léon (2024)
Medal record
Road cycling
Representing Belgium
European Road Championships
Bronze medal – third place	2020 Plouay	Junior road race

Arnaud De Lie (born 16 March 2002) is a Belgian professional cyclist, who currently rides for UCI WorldTeam Lotto–Intermarché. He was promoted from the Lotto–Soudal U23 team at the end of the 2021 season.

== Career ==
De Lie opened his first professional season in 2022 with the Vuelta a Mallorca races. He finished 71st and 117th in the first two races and won the fourth race Trofeo Playa de Palma in a bunch sprint against Juan Sebastián Molano, his first professional victory.

After his win in Mallorca, he won eight more races in the season, finishing in 13th position in the end of year rankings as the best rider for Lotto–Soudal. He scored many points in the battle to avoid relegation but his team was relegated to the second division.

In 2023, De Lie again started the season in Spain, winning his season opener: the Clàssica Comunitat Valenciana 1969. He then competed at the Étoile de Bessèges, winning two stages, followed by winning the sprtint for second place at the Omloop Het Nieuwsblad in late February. In early May, he took his first UCI ProSeries win at the Grand Prix du Morbihan, before having to abandon the Four Days of Dunkirk on 16 May after falling heavily during the sprint of the first stage in Abbeville. He was found to have suffered a pneumothorax, fractures of the left clavicle, a rib and the upper part of the sternum. He returned to competition on 25 June in the Belgian National Road Race Championships, and returned to winning form a month later, taking stage two of the Tour de Wallonie. He won two more races in August: La Polynormande on the 13th and the Grote Prijs Jef Scherens two days later. On September 8, he took his biggest win yet, as well as his first at the UCI WorldTour level, outsprinting Corbin Strong and Michael Matthews at the Grand Prix Cycliste de Québec.

On September 28, he won the Circuit Franco-Belge on an uphill finish on the Mont-de-l'Enclus ahead of Rasmus Tiller. Three days later, he won the Famenne Ardenne Classic in his native province of Luxembourg. A few dozen meters before the finish, he broke the cleat of his right pedal but managed, by pedaling with one foot, to still hold off the chasers behind him and take the win. In total, Die Lie won 10 races in 2023.

In February 2024, De Lie sustained some injuries in a crash at Le Samyn. However, after recovering from this, he continued to see a lack of results, and after a blood test, was diagnosed with having Lyme disease. After receiving treatment with antibiotics, he took his first win of the season in late April, defending his title at the Famenne Ardenne Classic. A week later, he won the Tro-Bro Léon in an eight-man sprint.

== Major results ==
2019
1st Road race, National Junior Road Championships
1st Vlaams-Brabantse Pijl
5th Trofeo Comune di Vertova
7th Paris–Roubaix Juniors
7th La Route des Géants
8th E3 BinckBank Classic Junioren
2020
1st Overall La Philippe Gilbert Juniors

1st Mountains classification
1st Stage 1

3rd Road race, UEC European Junior Road Championships
7th Kuurne–Brussels–Kuurne Juniors
2021
1st Overall Okolo Jižních Čech

1st Points classification
1st Young rider classification
1st Stage 2

1st Omloop Het Nieuwsblad Beloften
Tour Alsace

1st Points classification
1st Stages 2 & 5

1st Stage 2 Circuit des Ardennes International
9th Paris–Tours Espoirs
2022 (9 pro wins)
1st Trofeo Playa de Palma
1st Grote Prijs Jean-Pierre Monseré
1st Volta Limburg Classic
1st Grote Prijs Marcel Kint
1st Heistse Pijl
1st Ronde van Limburg
1st Schaal Sels
1st Egmont Cycling Race
1st Stage 3 Tour de Wallonie
2nd Omloop van het Houtland
3rd Nokere Koerse
3rd Veenendaal–Veenendaal Classic
4th Bretagne Classic
4th Tro-Bro Léon
5th Paris–Chauny
6th Dwars door het Hageland
6th Circuit Franco-Belge
6th Polynormande
6th Gooikse Pijl
7th Eschborn–Frankfurt
8th Classic Brugge–De Panne
8th Paris–Bourges
9th Bredene Koksijde Classic
10th Le Samyn
2023 (10)
1st Grand Prix Cycliste de Québec
1st Circuit Franco-Belge
1st Grand Prix du Morbihan
1st Clàssica Comunitat Valenciana 1969
1st Famenne Ardenne Classic
1st Polynormande
1st Tour of Leuven
1st Stage 2 Tour de Wallonie
Renewi Tour

1st Points classification
1st Young rider classification

2nd Omloop Het Nieuwsblad
2nd Clásica de Almería
2nd Tro-Bro Léon
2nd Paris–Bourges
4th Road race, UEC European Road Championships
6th Dwars door Vlaanderen
6th Binche–Chimay–Binche
7th Overall Étoile de Bessèges

1st Points classification
1st Stages 1 & 3

7th Hamburg Cyclassics
7th Kuurne–Brussels–Kuurne
7th Brabantse Pijl
2024 (7)
1st Road race, National Road Championships
1st Overall Danmark Rundt

1st Young rider classification

1st Tro-Bro Léon
1st Circuit de Wallonie
1st Famenne Ardenne Classic
1st Binche–Chimay–Binche
1st Stage 5 Renewi Tour
3rd Grand Prix du Morbihan
3rd Ronde van Limburg
4th Bretagne Classic
4th Clásica de Almería
4th Grand Prix de Denain
4th Antwerp Port Epic
6th Bredene Koksijde Classic
7th Paris–Tours
10th Omloop Het Nieuwsblad
2025 (7)
1st Overall Renewi Tour

1st Stage 5

1st Bretagne Classic
1st Grand Prix de Wallonie
1st Super 8 Classic
1st Paris–Chauny
1st Stage 3 Étoile de Bessèges
2nd Hamburg Cyclassics
2nd Münsterland Giro
4th Clásica de Almería
8th Grand Prix Cycliste de Québec
9th Grand Prix de Denain
2026 (2)
1st Famenne Ardenne Classic
3rd Overall Tour de Wallonie

1st Stage 4

4th Gent–Wevelgem
6th Clásica de Almería
10th Hamburg Cyclassics

=== Grand Tour general classification results timeline ===
Grand Tour	2022	2023	2024	2025	2026
Giro d'Italia	—	—	—	—	DNF
Tour de France	—	—	119	142	
Vuelta a España	—	—	—	—	

=== Classics results timeline ===
Monument	2022	2023	2024	2025	2026
Milan–San Remo	—	95	—	—	—
Tour of Flanders	—	—	—	—	—
Paris–Roubaix	—	50	—	—	DNF
Liège–Bastogne–Liège	—	—	—	—	—
Giro di Lombardia	—	—	—	—	—
Classic	2022	2023	2024	2025	2026
Omloop Het Nieuwsblad	—	2	10	86	62
Kuurne–Brussels–Kuurne	92	7	—	—	DNF
Classic Brugge–De Panne	8	—	—	126	—
Gent–Wevelgem	48	42	90	DNF	4
Dwars door Vlaanderen	DNF	6	—	—	DNF
Scheldeprijs	14	—	—	—	—
Brabantse Pijl	—	7	—	—	—
Eschborn–Frankfurt	7	11	—	—	—
Hamburg Cyclassics	—	7	21	2	10
Bretagne Classic	4	55	4	1	
Grand Prix Cycliste de Québec	—	1	13	8	
Grand Prix Cycliste de Montréal	—	34	DNF	29	
Paris–Tours	DNF	DNF	7	111	

=== Major championships timeline ===
Event		2022	2023	2024	2025
World Championships	Road race	—	—	—	—
European Championships	Road race	—	4	—	—
National Championships	Road race	6	57	1	75

Legend
—	Did not compete
DNF	Did not finish
IP	In progress
