= 2023 Gran Piemonte =

2023 UCI ProSeries

Race details
- Dates: 5 October 2023
- Stages: 1
- Distance: 152 km (94.45 mi)
- Winning time: 3h 20' 25"

Results
	Winner	Andrea Bagioli (ITA)	(Soudal–Quick-Step)
	Second	Marc Hirschi (SUI)	(UAE Team Emirates)
	Third	Alex Aranburu (ESP)	(Movistar Team)

The 2023 Gran Piemonte was the 107th edition of the Gran Piemonte (known as Giro del Piemonte until 2009) single-day cycling race. It was held on 5 October 2023, over a distance of 152 km, starting in Borgofranco d'Ivrea and ending in Favria.

The race was won by Andrea Bagioli of Soudal–Quick-Step.

== Teams ==
Fifteen UCI WorldTeams and seven UCI ProTeams made up the 22 teams that participated in the race.

UCI WorldTeams

- Alpecin–Deceuninck
- Astana Qazaqstan Team
- Bora–Hansgrohe
- Cofidis
- EF Education–EasyPost
- Ineos Grenadiers
- Intermarché–Circus–Wanty
- Lidl–Trek
- Movistar Team
- Soudal–Quick-Step
- Team Bahrain Victorious
- Team dsm–firmenich
- Team Jayco–AlUla
- Team Jumbo–Visma
- UAE Team Emirates

UCI ProTeams

- Eolo–Kometa
- Green Project–Bardiani–CSF–Faizanè
- Israel–Premier Tech
- Lotto–Dstny
- Q36.5 Pro Cycling Team
- Team Corratec–Selle Italia
- Tudor Pro Cycling Team

== Results ==
Result
Rank	Rider	Team	Time
1	Andrea Bagioli (ITA)	Soudal–Quick-Step	3h 20' 25"
2	Marc Hirschi (SUI)	UAE Team Emirates	+ 0"
3	Alex Aranburu (ESP)	Movistar Team	+ 0"
4	Filippo Ganna (ITA)	Ineos Grenadiers	+ 11"
5	Rui Costa (POR)	Intermarché–Circus–Wanty	+ 11"
6	Georg Zimmermann (GER)	Intermarché–Circus–Wanty	+ 11"
7	Martin Marcellusi (ITA)	Green Project–Bardiani–CSF–Faizanè	+ 16"
8	Harold Tejada (COL)	Astana Qazaqstan Team	+ 16"
9	Antonio Tiberi (ITA)	Team Bahrain Victorious	+ 16"
10	Nick Schultz (AUS)	Israel–Premier Tech	+ 16"
