= 2023 GP Miguel Induráin =

2023 UCI ProSeries

Race details
- Dates: 1 April 2023
- Stages: 1
- Distance: 203.2 km (126.3 mi)
- Winning time: 5h 09' 05"

Results
	Winner	Ion Izagirre (ESP)	(Cofidis)
	Second	Sergio Higuita (COL)	(Bora–Hansgrohe)
	Third	Mattias Skjelmose Jensen (DEN)	(Trek–Segafredo)

The 2023 GP Miguel Induráin was the 69th edition of the GP Miguel Induráin road cycling one day race, which was held on 1 April 2023, starting and finishing in Estella.

== Teams ==
Ten of the eighteen UCI WorldTeams, ten UCI ProTeams, and one UCI Continental team made up the twenty-one teams that participated in the race. Of these teams, 15 entered a full squad of seven riders, while AG2R Citroën Team, Cofidis, Lotto–Dstny, Team Jayco–AlUla, Team Novo Nordisk, Trek–Segafredo entered six riders.

UCI WorldTeams

- AG2R Citroën Team
- Arkéa–Samsic
- Astana Qazaqstan Team
- Bora–Hansgrohe
- Cofidis
- EF Education–EasyPost
- Movistar Team
- Team Jayco–AlUla
- Trek–Segafredo
- UAE Team Emirates

UCI ProTeams

- Burgos BH
- Caja Rural–Seguros RGA
- Eolo–Kometa
- Equipo Kern Pharma
- Euskaltel–Euskadi
- Human Powered Health
- Israel–Premier Tech
- Lotto–Dstny
- Team Novo Nordisk
- Team TotalEnergies

UCI Continental Teams

- Electro Hiper Europa

== Result ==
Result
Rank	Rider	Team	Time
1	Ion Izagirre (ESP)	Cofidis	5h 09' 05"
2	Sergio Higuita (COL)	Bora–Hansgrohe	+ 2"
3	Mattias Skjelmose Jensen (DEN)	Trek–Segafredo	+ 13"
4	Andreas Kron (DEN)	Lotto–Dstny	+ 20"
5	Roger Adrià (ESP)	Equipo Kern Pharma	+ 20"
6	Alex Aranburu (ESP)	Movistar Team	+ 23"
7	Corbin Strong (NZL)	Israel–Premier Tech	+ 25"
8	Élie Gesbert (FRA)	Arkéa–Samsic	+ 25"
9	Felix Gall (AUT)	AG2R Citroën Team	+ 32"
10	Christian Scaroni (ITA)	Astana Qazaqstan Team	+ 32"
