= 2023 Grand Prix de Denain =

French cycling race

2023 UCI ProSeries

Race details
- Dates: 16 March 2022
- Stages: 1
- Distance: 192.7 km (119.7 mi)
- Winning time: 4h 37' 54"

Results
	Winner	Juan Sebastian Molano (COL)	(UAE Team Emirates)
	Second	Tim van Dijke (NED)	(Team Jumbo–Visma)
	Third	Timo Kielich (BEL)	(Alpecin–Deceuninck)

The 2023 Grand Prix de Denain – Porte du Hainaut was the 64th edition of the Grand Prix de Denain one-day road cycling race. It was held on 16 March 2023 as a category 1.Pro race on the 2023 UCI ProSeries calendar.

== Teams ==
Nine of the 18 UCI WorldTeams, seven UCI ProTeams, and three UCI Continental teams made up the 19 teams that participated in the race. Two teams did not enter a full squad of seven riders; Team TotalEnergies entered six riders, while Trek–Segafredo entered five riders. In total, 129 riders started the race, of which 87 finished.

UCI WorldTeams

- AG2R Citroën Team
- Alpecin–Deceuninck
- Arkéa–Samsic
- Cofidis
- Groupama–FDJ
- Intermarché–Circus–Wanty
- Team Jumbo–Visma
- Trek–Segafredo
- UAE Team Emirates

UCI ProTeams

- Bingoal WB
- Human Powered Health
- Lotto–Dstny
- Q36.5 Pro Cycling Team
- Team Corratec
- Team Flanders–Baloise
- Team TotalEnergies

UCI Continental Teams

- Go Sport–Roubaix–Lille Métropole
- St. Michel–Mavic–Auber93
- CIC U Nantes Atlantique

== Result ==
Result (1–10)
Rank	Rider	Team	Time
1	Juan Sebastian Molano (COL)	UAE Team Emirates	4h 37' 54"
2	Tim van Dijke (NED)	Team Jumbo–Visma	+ 0"
3	Timo Kielich (BEL)	Alpecin–Deceuninck	+ 0"
4	Edvald Boasson Hagen (NOR)	Team TotalEnergies	+ 0"
5	Mikkel Bjerg (DEN)	UAE Team Emirates	+ 5"
6	Sam Watson (GBR)	Groupama–FDJ	+ 9"
7	Milan Menten (BEL)	Lotto–Dstny	+ 12"
8	Taco van der Hoorn (NED)	Intermarché–Circus–Wanty	+ 14"
9	Thomas Gachignard (FRA)	St. Michel–Mavic–Auber93	+ 17"
10	Paul Lapeira (FRA)	AG2R Citroën Team	+ 17"
