= 2023 Grand Prix Cycliste de Québec =

One-day cycling race in Canada

2023 UCI World Tour, race 32 of 35

Race details
- Dates: 8 September 2023
- Stages: 1
- Distance: 201.6 km (125.3 mi)
- Winning time: 4h 47' 36"

Results
	Winner	Arnaud De Lie (BEL)	(Lotto–Dstny)
	Second	Corbin Strong (NZL)	(Israel–Premier Tech)
	Third	Michael Matthews (AUS)	(Team Jayco–AlUla)

The 2023 Grand Prix Cycliste de Québec was a road cycling one-day race that took place on 8 September 2023 in Quebec City, Canada. It was the 12th edition of the Grand Prix Cycliste de Québec and the 32nd event of the 2023 UCI World Tour. The race was won by Arnaud De Lie in a bunch sprint.

== Teams ==
All eighteen UCI WorldTeams, four UCI ProTeams, and the Canadian national team made up the twenty-three teams that participated in the race.

UCI WorldTeams

- AG2R Citroën Team
- Alpecin–Deceuninck
- Arkéa–Samsic
- Astana Qazaqstan Team
- Bora–Hansgrohe
- Cofidis
- EF Education–EasyPost
- Groupama–FDJ
- Ineos Grenadiers
- Intermarché–Circus–Wanty
- Lidl–Trek
- Movistar Team
- Soudal–Quick-Step
- Team Bahrain Victorious
- Team dsm–firmenich
- Team Jayco–AlUla
- Team Jumbo–Visma
- UAE Team Emirates

UCI ProTeams

- Israel–Premier Tech
- Lotto–Dstny
- Team Novo Nordisk
- Tudor Pro Cycling Team

National Teams

- Canada

== Result ==
Result
Rank	Rider	Team	Time
1	Arnaud De Lie (BEL)	Lotto–Dstny	4h 47' 36"
2	Corbin Strong (NZL)	Israel–Premier Tech	+ 0"
3	Michael Matthews (AUS)	Team Jayco–AlUla	+ 0"
4	Alex Aranburu (ESP)	Movistar Team	+ 0"
5	Matej Mohorič (SLO)	Team Bahrain Victorious	+ 0"
6	Christophe Laporte (FRA)	Team Jumbo–Visma	+ 0"
7	Alexander Kamp (DEN)	Tudor Pro Cycling Team	+ 0"
8	Marc Hirschi (SUI)	UAE Team Emirates	+ 0"
9	Julian Alaphilippe (FRA)	Soudal–Quick-Step	+ 0"
10	Mattias Skjelmose (DEN)	Lidl–Trek	+ 0"
