= 2023 Clásica de Almería =

2023 UCI ProSeries

Race details
- Dates: 12 February 2022
- Stages: 1
- Distance: 190.3 km (118.2 mi)
- Winning time: 4h 43' 16"

Results
	Winner	Matteo Moschetti (ITA)	(Q36.5 Pro Cycling Team)
	Second	Arnaud De Lie (BEL)	(Lotto–Dstny)
	Third	Jordi Meeus (BEL)	(Bora–Hansgrohe)

The 2023 Clásica de Almería was the 38th edition of the Clásica de Almería one-day road cycling race. It was held on 12 February 2023 as a category 1. Pro race on the 2023 UCI ProSeries.

== Teams ==
11 of the 18 UCI WorldTeams and 10 UCI ProTeams made up the 21 teams that participated in the race. All teams entered a full squad of seven riders each. In total, 145 riders started the race, of which 140 finished.

UCI WorldTeams

- Arkéa–Samsic
- Astana Qazaqstan Team
- Bora–Hansgrohe
- Cofidis
- Groupama–FDJ
- INEOS Grenadiers
- Intermarché–Circus–Wanty
- Lotto–Dstny
- Movistar Team
- UAE Team Emirates
- Uno-X Pro Cycling Team

UCI ProTeams

- Burgos BH
- Caja Rural–Seguros RGA
- Eolo–Kometa
- Equipo Kern Pharma
- Euskaltel–Euskadi
- Israel–Premier Tech
- Q36.5 Pro Cycling Team
- Team Flanders–Baloise
- Team TotalEnergies
- Tudor Pro Cycling Team

== Result ==
Result (1–10)
Rank	Rider	Team	Time
1	Matteo Moschetti (ITA)	Q36.5 Pro Cycling Team	4h 43' 16"
2	Arnaud De Lie (BEL)	Lotto–Dstny	+ 0"
3	Jordi Meeus (BEL)	Bora–Hansgrohe	+ 0"
4	Alexander Kristoff (NOR)	Uno-X Pro Cycling Team	+ 0"
5	Giacomo Nizzolo (ITA)	Israel–Premier Tech	+ 0"
6	Max Walscheid (GER)	Cofidis	+ 0"
7	Fernando Gaviria (COL)	Movistar Team	+ 0"
8	Jason Tesson (FRA)	Team TotalEnergies	+ 0"
9	Paul Penhoët (FRA)	Groupama–FDJ	+ 0"
10	Juan Sebastián Molano (COL)	UAE Team Emirates	+ 0"
