= 2023 Super 8 Classic =

2023 UCI ProSeries
- Event poster with previous winner Jordi Meeus

Race details
- Dates: 16 September 2023
- Stages: 1
- Distance: 203.6 km (126.5 mi)
- Winning time: 4h 39' 29"

Results
	Winner	Mathieu van der Poel (NLD)	(Alpecin–Deceuninck)
	Second	Anthony Turgis (FRA)	(Team TotalEnergies)
	Third	Florian Vermeersch (BEL)	(Lotto–Dstny)

The 2023 Super 8 Classic (also known as the Grand Prix Impanis-Van Petegem) was the 25th edition of the Super 8 Classic road cycling one day race, which was held on 16 September 2023 as part of the 2023 UCI ProSeries calendar.

== Teams ==
12 of the 18 UCI WorldTeams and seven UCI ProTeams made up the 19 teams that participated in the race.

UCI WorldTeams

- AG2R Citroën Team
- Alpecin–Deceuninck
- Arkéa–Samsic
- Cofidis
- Intermarché–Circus–Wanty
- Lidl–Trek
- Movistar Team
- Soudal–Quick-Step
- Team dsm–firmenich
- Team Jayco–AlUla
- Team Jumbo–Visma
- UAE Team Emirates

UCI ProTeams

- Bingoal WB
- Israel–Premier Tech
- Lotto–Dstny
- Team Flanders–Baloise
- Team TotalEnergies
- Tudor Pro Cycling Team
- Uno-X Pro Cycling Team

== Result ==
Result
Rank	Rider	Team	Time
1	Mathieu van der Poel (NED)	Alpecin–Deceuninck	4h 39' 29"
2	Anthony Turgis (FRA)	Team TotalEnergies	+ 0"
3	Florian Vermeersch (BEL)	Lotto–Dstny	+ 0"
4	Lars Boven (NED)	Team Jumbo–Visma	+ 0"
5	Jakob Fuglsang (DEN)	Israel–Premier Tech	+ 0"
6	Gianni Vermeersch (BEL)	Alpecin–Deceuninck	+ 7"
7	Alexander Kristoff (NOR)	Uno-X Pro Cycling Team	+ 15"
8	Luka Mezgec (SLO)	Team Jayco–AlUla	+ 15"
9	Florian Sénéchal (FRA)	Soudal–Quick-Step	+ 15"
10	Sandy Dujardin (FRA)	Team TotalEnergies	+ 15"
