= 2023 Ardèche Classic =

2023 Faun-Ardèche Classic
2023 UCI ProSeries

Race details
- Dates: 25 February 2023
- Stages: 1
- Distance: 168.5 km (104.7 mi)
- Winning time: 4h 22' 50"

Results
	Winner	Julian Alaphilippe (FRA)	(Soudal–Quick-Step)
	Second	David Gaudu (FRA)	(Groupama–FDJ)
	Third	Mattias Skjelmose Jensen (DEN)	(Trek–Segafredo)

The 2023 Faun-Ardèche Classic was the 23rd edition of the Classic Sud-Ardèche cycle race. It was held on 25 February 2023 as a category 1.Pro race on the UCI ProSeries. The race started and finished in Guilherand-Granges. The race was won by Julian Alaphilippe of Soudal–Quick-Step.

== Teams ==
Twenty-one teams of up to seven riders started the race: fourteen UCI WorldTeams, five UCI ProTeams, and two UCI Continental. 106 riders finished out of the 138 who entered the race.

UCI WorldTeams

- AG2R Citroën Team
- Arkéa–Samsic
- Astana Qazaqstan Team
- Bora–Hansgrohe
- Cofidis
- EF Education–EasyPost
- Groupama–FDJ
- Intermarché–Circus–Wanty
- Lotto–Dstny
- Soudal–Quick-Step
- Team DSM
- Team Jayco–AlUla
- Trek–Segafredo
- UAE Team Emirates

UCI ProTeams

- Bingoal WB
- Israel–Premier Tech
- Team TotalEnergies
- Tudor Pro Cycling Team
- Uno-X Pro Cycling Team

UCI Continental Teams

- St. Michel–Mavic–Auber93
- CIC U Nantes Atlantique

== Result ==
Result
Rank	Rider	Team	Time
1	Julian Alaphilippe (FRA)	Soudal–Quick-Step	4h 22' 50"
2	David Gaudu (FRA)	Groupama–FDJ	+ 0"
3	Mattias Skjelmose Jensen (DEN)	Trek–Segafredo	+ 31"
4	Victor Lafay (FRA)	Cofidis	+ 31"
5	Romain Grégoire (FRA)	Groupama–FDJ	+ 43"
6	Felix Gall (AUT)	AG2R Citroën Team	+ 43"
7	Lorenzo Rota (ITA)	Intermarché–Circus–Wanty	+ 43"
8	Guillaume Martin (FRA)	Cofidis	+ 51"
9	Rui Costa (POR)	Intermarché–Circus–Wanty	+ 54"
10	Pierre Latour (FRA)	Team TotalEnergies	+ 54"
