= 2023 Paris–Tours =

- 2023 UCI ProSeries

Race details
- Dates: 8 October 2023
- Stages: 1
- Distance: 213.9 km (132.9 mi)
- Winning time: 4h 39' 05"

Results
| | Winner | Riley Sheehan (USA) | (Israel–Premier Tech) |
| | Second | Lewis Askey (GBR) | (Groupama–FDJ) |
| | Third | Tobias Halland Johannessen (NOR) | (Uno-X Pro Cycling Team) |

The 2023 Paris–Tours was the 117th edition of the Paris–Tours road cycling classic. It was held on 8 October 2023 as part of the 2023 UCI ProSeries calendar.

== Teams ==
12 of the 18 UCI WorldTeams, seven UCI ProTeams, and four UCI Continental teams made up the 23 teams that participated in the race. Team Jumbo–Visma, UAE Team Emirates, Bora–Hansgrohe and Q36.5 Pro Cycling Team were the only teams to not enter a full squad of seven riders. Of the 157 riders who started the race, 141 finished.

UCI WorldTeams

- AG2R Citroën Team
- Alpecin–Deceuninck
- Arkéa–Samsic
- Bora–Hansgrohe
- Cofidis
- EF Education–EasyPost
- Groupama–FDJ
- Intermarché–Circus–Wanty
- Lidl–Trek
- Team dsm–firmenich
- Team Jumbo–Visma
- UAE Team Emirates

UCI ProTeams

- Bingoal WB
- Equipo Kern Pharma
- Israel–Premier Tech
- Lotto–Dstny
- Q36.5 Pro Cycling Team
- Team TotalEnergies
- Uno-X Pro Cycling Team

UCI Continental Teams

- CIC U Nantes Atlantique
- Nice Métropole Côte d'Azur
- St. Michel–Mavic–Auber93
- Van Rysel–Roubaix–Lille Métropole

== Result ==
Result
| Rank | Rider | Team | Time |
|---|---|---|---|
| 1 | Riley Sheehan (USA) | Israel–Premier Tech | 4h 39' 05" |
| 2 | Lewis Askey (GBR) | Groupama–FDJ | + 0" |
| 3 | Tobias Halland Johannessen (NOR) | Uno-X Pro Cycling Team | + 0" |
| 4 | Joris Delbove (FRA) | St. Michel–Mavic–Auber93 | + 0" |
| 5 | Olivier Le Gac (FRA) | Groupama–FDJ | + 7" |
| 6 | Christophe Laporte (FRA) | Team Jumbo–Visma | + 9" |
| 7 | Tom Van Asbroeck (BEL) | Israel–Premier Tech | + 9" |
| 8 | Arnaud Démare (FRA) | Arkéa–Samsic | + 9" |
| 9 | Edward Theuns (BEL) | Lidl–Trek | + 9" |
| 10 | Paul Penhoët (FRA) | Groupama–FDJ | + 9" |
