= Famenne Ardenne Classic =

One-day professional cycling race

Race details
- Date: October
- Region: Marche-en-Famenne, Belgium
- Discipline: Road
- Competition: UCI Europe Tour
- Type: One-day race
- Web site: famenneardenneclassic.be

History
- First edition: 2017
- Editions: 8 (as of 2026)
- First winner: Moreno Hofland (NED)
- Most wins: Arnaud De Lie (BEL) (3)
- Most recent: Arnaud De Lie (BEL)

The Famenne Ardenne Classic is a one-day professional cycling race held annually in Belgium since 2017. It is part of UCI Europe Tour in category 1.1. It starts and arrives in Marche-en-Famenne.

In the 2023 edition, Arnaud De Lie crossed the finish line first ahead of the oncoming peloton, pushing his bike forward on one leg. Just before that his clip pedal had broken.

== Winners ==
Year	Country	Rider	Team
2017	Netherlands	Moreno Hofland	Lotto–Soudal
2018	Canada	Guillaume Boivin	Israel Cycling Academy
2019	Belgium	Dimitri Claeys	Cofidis
2020-2021	No race due to COVID-19 pandemic		
2022	France	Axel Zingle	Cofidis
2023	Belgium	Arnaud De Lie	Lotto–Dstny
2024	Belgium	Arnaud De Lie	Lotto–Dstny
2025	Germany	Max Kanter	XDS Astana Team
2026	Belgium	Arnaud De Lie	Lotto–Intermarché
