= 2024 UAE Team Emirates season =

UAE Team Emirates
- 2024 season
- UCI code: UAD
- Status: UCI WorldTeam
- Manager: Mauro Gianetti (SWI)
- Main sponsor(s): Emirates; United Arab Emirates
- Based: United Arab Emirates
- Bicycles: Colnago
- Groupset: Shimano

Season victories
- One-day races: 18
- Stage race overall: 12
- Stage race stages: 45
- World Championships: 1
- National Championships: 6
- Most wins: (Slovenia) Tadej Pogačar (25)

The 2024 season for UAE Team Emirates is the 26th season in the team's existence and the 8th under the current name. The team has been a UCI WorldTeam since 2005, when the tier was first established.

== Team roster ==
As of 25 January 2024.

Rider	Date of birth
João Almeida (POR)	5 August 1998 (aged 25)
Igor Arrieta (ESP)	December 8, 2002 (age 23)
Juan Ayuso (ESP)	16 September 2002 (aged 21)
Filippo Baroncini (ITA)	26 August 2000 (aged 23)
Sjoerd Bax (NED)	6 January 1996 (aged 27)
Mikkel Bjerg (DEN)	3 November 1998 (aged 25)
Jan Christen (SUI)	26 June 2004 (aged 19)
Alessandro Covi (ITA)	28 September 1998 (aged 25)
Isaac del Toro (MEX)	27 November 2003 (aged 20)
Finn Fisher-Black (NZL)	21 December 2001 (aged 22)
Felix Großschartner (AUT)	23 December 1993 (aged 30)
Marc Hirschi (SUI)	24 August 1998 (aged 25)
Álvaro Hodeg (COL)	16 September 1996 (aged 27)
Vegard Stake Laengen (NOR)	7 February 1989 (aged 34)
Rafał Majka (POL)	12 September 1989 (aged 34)

Rider	Date of birth
Brandon McNulty (USA)	2 April 1998 (aged 25)
Juan Sebastián Molano (COL)	4 November 1994 (aged 29)
António Morgado (POR)	28 January 2004 (aged 19)
Domen Novak (SLO)	12 July 1995 (aged 28)
Ivo Oliveira (POR)	5 September 1996 (aged 27)
Rui Oliveira (POR)	5 September 1996 (aged 27)
Tadej Pogačar (SLO)	21 September 1998 (aged 25)
Nils Politt (GER)	6 March 1994 (aged 29)
Pavel Sivakov (FRA)	11 July 1997 (aged 26)
Marc Soler (ESP)	22 November 1993 (aged 30)
Diego Ulissi (ITA)	15 July 1989 (aged 34)
Jay Vine (AUS)	16 November 1995 (aged 28)
Michael Vink (NZL)	22 November 1991 (aged 32)
Tim Wellens (BEL)	10 May 1991 (aged 32)
Adam Yates (GBR)	7 August 1992 (aged 31)

== Season victories ==
Date	Race	Competition	Rider	Country	Location	Ref.
17 January	Tour Down Under, stage 2	UCI World Tour	Isaac del Toro (MEX)	Australia	Lobethal	
3 February	Volta a la Comunitat Valenciana, stage 4	UCI ProSeries	Brandon McNulty (USA)	Spain	La Vall d'Ebo	
4 February	Volta a la Comunitat Valenciana, overall	UCI ProSeries	Brandon McNulty (USA)	Spain		
9 February	Muscat Classic	UCI Asia Tour	Finn Fisher-Black (NZL)	Oman	Al-Bustan	
11 February	Tour of Oman, stage 2	UCI ProSeries	Finn Fisher-Black (NZL)	Oman	Qurayyat	
14 February	Tour of Oman, stage 5	UCI ProSeries	Adam Yates (GBR)	Oman	Jebel Akhdar	
14 February	Tour of Oman, overall	UCI ProSeries	Adam Yates (GBR)	Oman		
20 February	UAE Tour, stage 2 (ITT)	UCI World Tour	Brandon McNulty (USA)	United Arab Emirates	Al Hudayriyat Island	
24 February	Ardèche Classic	UCI ProSeries	Juan Ayuso (ESP)	France	Guilherand-Granges	
25 February	La Drôme Classic	UCI ProSeries	Marc Hirschi (SWI)	France	Étoile-sur-Rhône	
2 March	Strade Bianche	UCI World Tour	Tadej Pogačar (SLO)	Italy	Siena	
4 March	Tirreno–Adriatico, stage 1 (ITT)	UCI World Tour	Juan Ayuso (ESP)	Italy	Camaiore	
5 March	Paris–Nice, stage 3 (TTT)	UCI World Tour	(Note: The riders in the squad were João Almeida, Finn Fisher-Black, Felix Großschartner, Brandon McNulty, Nils Politt, Marc Soler and Jay Vine.)	France	Auxerre	
19 March	Volta a Catalunya, stage 2	UCI World Tour	Tadej Pogačar (SLO)	Spain	Vallter	
20 March	Coppi e Bartali, stage 2	UCI Europe Tour	Diego Ulissi (ITA)	Italy	Sogliano al Rubicone	
20 March	Volta a Catalunya, stage 3	UCI World Tour	Tadej Pogačar (SLO)	Spain	Port Ainé	
23 March	Volta a Catalunya, stage 6	UCI World Tour	Tadej Pogačar (SLO)	Spain	Queralt	
24 March	Volta a Catalunya, stage 7	UCI World Tour	Tadej Pogačar (SLO)	Spain	Barcelona	
24 March	Volta a Catalunya, overall	UCI World Tour	Tadej Pogačar (SLO)	Spain		
30 March	GP Miguel Induráin	UCI ProSeries	Brandon McNulty (USA)	Spain	Estella	
6 April	Tour of the Basque Country, overall	UCI World Tour	Juan Ayuso (ESP)	Spain		
10 April	Giro d'Abruzzo, stage 2	UCI Europe Tour	Jan Christen (SWI)	Italy	Magliano de' Marsi	
12 April	Giro d'Abruzzo, stage 4	UCI Europe Tour	Pavel Sivakov (FRA)	Italy	L'Aquila	
21 April	Giro della Romagna	UCI Europe Tour	António Morgado (POR)	Italy	Castrocaro Terme e Terra del Sole	
21 April	Liège–Bastogne–Liège	UCI World Tour	Tadej Pogačar (SLO)	Belgium	Liège	
26 April	Vuelta a Asturias, stage 1	UCI Europe Tour	Isaac del Toro (MEX)	Spain	Pola de Lena	
26 April	Tour de Romandie, stage 3 (ITT)	UCI World Tour	Brandon McNulty (USA)	Switzerland	Oron	
27 April	Vuelta a Asturias, stage 2	UCI Europe Tour	António Morgado (POR)	Spain	Ribadesella	
28 April	Vuelta a Asturias, stage 3	UCI Europe Tour	Finn Fisher-Black (NZL)	Spain	Oviedo	
28 April	Vuelta a Asturias, overall	UCI Europe Tour	Isaac del Toro (MEX)	Spain		
5 May	Giro d'Italia, stage 2	UCI World Tour	Tadej Pogačar (SLO)	Italy	Biella	
10 May	Giro d'Italia, stage 7 (ITT)	UCI World Tour	Tadej Pogačar (SLO)	Italy	Perugia	
11 May	Giro d'Italia, stage 8	UCI World Tour	Tadej Pogačar (SLO)	Italy	Prati di Tivo	
19 May	Giro d'Italia, stage 15	UCI World Tour	Tadej Pogačar (SLO)	Italy	Livigno	
21 May	Giro d'Italia, stage 16	UCI World Tour	Tadej Pogačar (SLO)	Italy	Santa Cristina Gherdëina	
25 May	Giro d'Italia, stage 20	UCI World Tour	Tadej Pogačar (SLO)	Italy	Bassano del Grappa	
26 May	Giro d'Italia, overall	UCI World Tour	Tadej Pogačar (SLO)	Italy		
13 June	Tour de Suisse, stage 5	UCI World Tour	Adam Yates (GBR)	Switzerland	Carì	
14 June	Tour de Suisse, stage 6	UCI World Tour	João Almeida (POR)	Switzerland	Blatten	
15 June	Tour de Suisse, stage 7	UCI World Tour	Adam Yates (GBR)	Switzerland	Villars-sur-Ollon	
16 June	Tour de Suisse, stage 8 (ITT)	UCI World Tour	João Almeida (POR)	Switzerland	Villars-sur-Ollon	
16 June	Tour de Suisse, overall	UCI World Tour	Adam Yates (GBR)	Switzerland		
4 July	Tour de France, stage 4	UCI World Tour	Tadej Pogačar (SLO)	France	Valloire	
5 July	Tour of Austria, stage 3	UCI Europe Tour	Diego Ulissi (ITA)	Austria	St. Johann Alpendorf	
7 July	Tour of Austria, overall	UCI Europe Tour	Diego Ulissi (ITA)	Austria		
13 July	Tour de France, stage 14	UCI World Tour	Tadej Pogačar (SLO)	France	Saint-Lary-Soulan (Pla d'Adet)	
14 July	Giro dell'Appennino	UCI Europe Tour	Jan Christen (SUI)	Italy	Genoa	
14 July	Tour de France, stage 15	UCI World Tour	Tadej Pogačar (SLO)	France	Plateau de Beille	
19 July	Tour de France, stage 19	UCI World Tour	Tadej Pogačar (SLO)	France	Isola 2000	
20 July	Tour de France, stage 20	UCI World Tour	Tadej Pogačar (SLO)	France	Col de la Couillole	
21 July	Tour de France, stage 21	UCI World Tour	Tadej Pogačar (SLO)	France	Nice	
21 July	Tour de France, overall	UCI World Tour	Tadej Pogačar (SLO)	France		
25 July	Prueba Villafranca de Ordizia	UCI Europe Tour	Jan Christen (SUI)	Spain	Ordizia	
26 July	Czech Tour, stage 2	UCI Europe Tour	Marc Hirschi (SUI)	Czech Republic	Pustevny	
28 July	Czech Tour, overall	UCI Europe Tour	Marc Hirschi (SUI)	Czech Republic		
8 August	Vuelta a Burgos, stage 4 (ITT)	UCI ProSeries	Jay Vine (AUS)	Spain	Pampliega	
10 August	Clásica de San Sebastián	UCI World Tour	Marc Hirschi (SUI)	Spain	San Sebastián	
13 August	Tour de Pologne, stage 2 (ITT)	UCI World Tour	Tim Wellens (BEL)	Poland	Karpacz	
17 August	Vuelta a España, stage 1 (ITT)	UCI World Tour	Brandon McNulty (USA)	Portugal	Oeiras	
25 August	Bretagne Classic Ouest-France	UCI World Tour	Marc Hirschi (SUI)	France	Plouay	
25 August	Vuelta a España, stage 9	UCI World Tour	Adam Yates (GBR)	Spain	Granada	
1 September	2024 Renewi Tour, overall	UCI World Tour	Tim Wellens (BEL)	Belgium		
3 September	Vuelta a España, stage 16	UCI World Tour	Marc Soler (ESP)	Spain	Lagos de Covadonga	
8 September	GP Industria & Artigianato di Larciano	UCI ProSeries	Marc Hirschi (SUI)	Italy	Larciano	
12 September	Coppa Sabatini	UCI ProSeries	Marc Hirschi (SUI)	Italy	Peccioli	
14 September	Memorial Marco Pantani	UCI Europe Tour	Marc Hirschi (SUI)	Italy	Cesenatico	
15 September	Grand Prix Cycliste de Montréal	UCI World Tour	Tadej Pogačar (SLO)	Canada	Montreal	
21 September	Tour de Luxembourg	UCI ProSeries	Juan Ayuso (SPA)	Luxembourg	Differdange	
21 September	Super 8 Classic	UCI ProSeries	Filippo Baroncini (ITA)	Belgium	Haacht	
2 October	CRO Race, stage 2	UCI Europe Tour	Juan Sebastián Molano (COL)	Croatia	Novalja	
3 October	CRO Race, stage 3	UCI Europe Tour	Brandon McNulty (USA)	Croatia	Opatija	
5 October	Giro dell'Emilia	UCI ProSeries	Tadej Pogačar (SLO)	Italy	San Luca	
3 October	CRO Race, overall	UCI Europe Tour	Brandon McNulty (USA)	Croatia		
6 October	Coppa Agostoni	UCI Europe Tour	Marc Hirschi (SUI)	Italy	Lissone	
12 October	Il Lombardia	UCI World Tour	Tadej Pogačar (SLO)	Italy	Como	

== National, Continental, and World Champions ==
Date	Discipline	Jersey	Rider	Country	Location	Ref.
15 May	United States National Time Trial Championships		Brandon McNulty (USA)	United States	Charleston	
20 June	Belgian National Time Trial Championships		Tim Wellens (BEL)	Belgium	Binche	
21 June	German National Time Trial Championships		Nils Politt (GER)	Germany	Bad Dürrheim	
21 June	Austrian National Time Trial Championships		Felix Großschartner (AUT)	Austria	Königswiesen	
21 June	Portuguese National Time Trial Championships		António Morgado (POR)	Portugal	Santa Maria da Feira	
23 June	Slovenian National Road Race Championships		Domen Novak (SLO)	Slovenia	Trebnje	
29 September	World Road Race Championships		Tadej Pogačar (SLO)	Switzerland	Zurich	
