= 2024 Lotto–Dstny season =

Lotto–Dstny
- 2024 season
- UCI code: LTS
- Status: UCI ProTeam
- Manager: Stéphane Heulot (FRA)
- Main sponsor(s): Lotto; Dstny
- Based: Belgium
- Bicycles: Orbea
- Groupset: Shimano

Season victories
- One-day races: 8
- Stage race overall: 1
- Stage race stages: 3
- National Championships: 1
- Most wins: (Belgium) Arnaud De Lie (Belgium) Lennert Van Eetvelt (Belgium) Maxim Van Gils (3 wins each)

The 2024 season for Lotto–Dstny is the 40th season in the team's existence and the second season under the current name and as a UCI ProTeam.

== Team roster ==
As of 15 January 2024.

| Rider | Date of birth |
|---|---|
| Johannes Adamietz (GER) | 24 May 1998 (aged 25) |
| Jenno Berckmoes (BEL) | 4 February 2001 (aged 22) |
| Cédric Beullens (BEL) | 27 January 1997 (aged 26) |
| Victor Campenaerts (BEL) | 28 October 1991 (aged 32) |
| Logan Currie (NZL) | 24 June 2001 (aged 22) |
| Jasper De Buyst (BEL) | 24 November 1993 (aged 30) |
| Thomas De Gendt (BEL) | 6 November 1986 (aged 37) |
| Arnaud De Lie (BEL) | 16 March 2002 (aged 21) |
| Jarrad Drizners (AUS) | 31 May 1999 (aged 24) |
| Pascal Eenkhoorn (NED) | 8 February 1997 (aged 26) |
| Jonas Gregaard (DEN) | 30 July 1996 (aged 27) |
| Sébastien Grignard (BEL) | 29 April 1999 (aged 24) |
| Jacopo Guarnieri (ITA) | 14 August 1987 (aged 36) |
| Andreas Kron (DEN) | 1 June 1998 (aged 25) |
| Arjen Livyns (BEL) | 1 September 1994 (aged 29) |

| Rider | Date of birth |
|---|---|
| Milan Menten (BEL) | 31 October 1996 (aged 27) |
| Sylvain Moniquet (BEL) | 14 January 1998 (aged 25) |
| Mathijs Paasschens (NED) | 18 March 1996 (aged 27) |
| Alec Segaert (BEL) | 16 January 2003 (aged 20) |
| Eduardo Sepúlveda (ARG) | 13 June 1991 (aged 32) |
| Liam Slock (BEL) | 18 September 2000 (aged 23) |
| Lionel Taminiaux (BEL) | 19 May 1996 (aged 27) |
| Jarne Van de Paar (BEL) | 23 October 2000 (aged 23) |
| Lennert Van Eetvelt (BEL) | 17 July 2001 (aged 22) |
| Maxim Van Gils (BEL) | 25 November 1999 (aged 24) |
| Brent Van Moer (BEL) | 12 January 1998 (aged 25) |
| Henri Vandenabeele (BEL) | 15 April 2000 (aged 23) |
| Harm Vanhoucke (BEL) | 17 June 1997 (aged 26) |
| Florian Vermeersch (BEL) | 12 April 1999 (aged 24) |

== Season victories ==
| Date | Race | Competition | Rider | Country | Location | Ref. |
|---|---|---|---|---|---|---|
| 26 January | Trofeo Serra de Tramuntana | UCI Europe Tour | Lennert Van Eetvelt (BEL) | Spain | Lluc | |
| 16 February | Vuelta a Andalucía, stage 3 (ITT) | UCI ProSeries | Maxim Van Gils (BEL) | Spain | Alcaudete | |
| 25 February | UAE Tour, stage 7 | UCI World Tour | Lennert Van Eetvelt (BEL) | United Arab Emirates | Jebel Hafeet | |
| 25 February | UAE Tour, overall | UCI World Tour | Lennert Van Eetvelt (BEL) | United Arab Emirates | | |
| 2 March | Grand Prix Criquielion | UCI Europe Tour | Alec Segaert (BEL) | Belgium | Lessines | |
| 3 March | Grote Prijs Jean-Pierre Monseré | UCI Europe Tour | Jarne Van de Paar (BEL) | Belgium | Roeselare | |
| 23 March | Settimana Internazionale di Coppi e Bartali, stage 5 | UCI Europe Tour | Jenno Berckmoes (BEL) | Italy | Forlì | |
| 28 April | Famenne Ardenne Classic | UCI Europe Tour | Arnaud De Lie (BEL) | Belgium | Marche-en-Famenne | |
| 1 May | Eschborn–Frankfurt | UCI World Tour | Maxim Van Gils (BEL) | Germany | Frankfurt | |
| 5 May | Tro-Bro Léon | UCI ProSeries | Arnaud De Lie (BEL) | France | Lannilis | |
| 9 May | Circuit de Wallonie | UCI Europe Tour | Arnaud De Lie (BEL) | Belgium | Marcinelle | |
| 7 June | Grand Prix of Aargau Canton | UCI Europe Tour | Maxim Van Gils (BEL) | Belgium | Leuggern | |

== National, Continental, and World Champions ==
| Date | Discipline | Jersey | Rider | Country | Location | Ref. |
|---|---|---|---|---|---|---|
| 8 February | New Zealand National Time Trial Championships | | Logan Currie (NZL) | New Zealand | Timaru | |
