= 2023 Tour de Luxembourg =

2023 UCI ProSeries

Race details
- Dates: 20–24 September 2023
- Stages: 5
- Distance: 709.8 km (441.0 mi)
- Winning time: 17h 15' 11"

Results
Jersey awarded to the overall winner	Winner	Marc Hirschi (SUI)	(UAE Team Emirates)
	Second	Brandon McNulty (USA)	(UAE Team Emirates)
	Third	Ben Healy (IRL)	(EF Education–EasyPost)
Jersey awarded to the points classification winner	Points	Søren Kragh Andersen (DEN)	(Alpecin–Deceuninck)
Jersey awarded to the mountains classification winner	Mountains	Mats Wenzel (LUX)	(Leopard TOGT Pro Cycling)
Jersey awarded to the youth classification winner	Youth	Marc Hirschi (SUI)	(UAE Team Emirates)
	Team	(United Arab Emirates) UAE Team Emirates	

The 2023 Tour de Luxembourg was the 83rd edition of the Tour de Luxembourg road cycling stage race. It started on 20 September and finished on 24 September, as part of the 2023 UCI ProSeries.

== Teams ==
Twelve UCI WorldTeams, six UCI ProTeams, and two UCI Continental team made up the twenty teams that participated in the race.

UCI WorldTeams

- AG2R Citroën Team
- Alpecin–Deceuninck
- Arkéa–Samsic
- Bora–Hansgrohe
- Cofidis
- EF Education–EasyPost
- Groupama–FDJ
- Lidl–Trek
- Movistar Team
- Soudal–Quick-Step
- Team Jumbo–Visma
- UAE Team Emirates

UCI ProTeams

- Bingoal WB
- Israel–Premier Tech
- Lotto–Dstny
- Team Flanders–Baloise
- Tudor Pro Cycling Team
- Uno-X Pro Cycling Team

UCI Continental Teams

- Global 6 Cycling
- Leopard TOGT Pro Cycling

== Route ==
Stage characteristics and winners
Stage	Date	Course	Distance	Type	Winner
1	20 September	Luxembourg - Abbaye De Neumünster to Luxembourg Kirchberg	156.4 km (97.2 mi)	Hilly stage	Corbin Strong (NZL)
2	21 September	Mondorf-les-Bains to Mamer	183.9 km (114.3 mi)	Flat stage	Jenthe Biermans (BEL)
3	22 September	Mertert to Vianden	168.4 km (104.6 mi)	Mountain stage	Ben Healy (IRL)
4	23 September	Pétange to Pétange	23.9 km (14.9 mi)	Individual time trial	Victor Campenaerts (BEL)
5	24 September	Mersch to Luxembourg Limpertsberg	177.2 km (110.1 mi)	Hilly stage	Tobias Halland Johannessen (NOR)
Total			709.8 km (441.0 mi)		

== Stages ==
=== Stage 1 ===
20 September 2023 — Luxembourg - Abbaye De Neumünster to Luxembourg Kirchberg, 156.4 km (97.2 mi)

Stage 1 Result
Rank	Rider	Team	Time
1	Corbin Strong (NZL)	Israel–Premier Tech	3h 51' 01"
2	Søren Kragh Andersen (DEN)	Alpecin–Deceuninck	+ 0"
3	Alex Aranburu (ESP)	Movistar Team	+ 0"
4	Diego Ulissi (ITA)	UAE Team Emirates	+ 0"
5	Tiesj Benoot (BEL)	Team Jumbo–Visma	+ 0"
6	Rick Pluimers (NED)	Tudor Pro Cycling Team	+ 0"
7	Giulio Ciccone (ITA)	Lidl–Trek	+ 0"
8	Alex Kirsch (LUX)	Lidl–Trek	+ 0"
9	Fausto Masnada (ITA)	Soudal–Quick-Step	+ 0"
10	Ilan Van Wilder (BEL)	Soudal–Quick-Step	+ 0"

General classification after Stage 1
Rank	Rider	Team	Time
1	Corbin Strong (NZL)	Israel–Premier Tech	3h 50' 51"
2	Søren Kragh Andersen (DEN)	Alpecin–Deceuninck	+ 4"
3	Alex Aranburu (ESP)	Movistar Team	+ 6"
4	Diego Ulissi (ITA)	UAE Team Emirates	+ 10"
5	Tiesj Benoot (BEL)	Team Jumbo–Visma	+ 10"
6	Rick Pluimers (NED)	Tudor Pro Cycling Team	+ 10"
7	Giulio Ciccone (ITA)	Lidl–Trek	+ 10"
8	Alex Kirsch (LUX)	Lidl–Trek	+ 10"
9	Fausto Masnada (ITA)	Soudal–Quick-Step	+ 10"
10	Ilan Van Wilder (BEL)	Soudal–Quick-Step	+ 10"

=== Stage 2 ===
21 September 2023 — Mondorf-les-Bains to Mamer, 183.9 km (114.3 mi)

Stage 2 Result
Rank	Rider	Team	Time
1	Jenthe Biermans (BEL)	Arkéa–Samsic	4h 31' 10"
2	Søren Kragh Andersen (DEN)	Alpecin–Deceuninck	+ 0"
3	Tim van Dijke (NED)	Team Jumbo–Visma	+ 0"
4	Jordi Meeus (BEL)	Bora–Hansgrohe	+ 0"
5	Andrea Bagioli (ITA)	Soudal–Quick-Step	+ 0"
6	Alex Kirsch (LUX)	Lidl–Trek	+ 0"
7	Alex Aranburu (ESP)	Movistar Team	+ 0"
8	Maxim Van Gils (BEL)	Lotto–Dstny	+ 0"
9	Franck Bonnamour (FRA)	AG2R Citroën Team	+ 0"
10	Rick Pluimers (NED)	Tudor Pro Cycling Team	+ 0"

General classification after Stage 2
Rank	Rider	Team	Time
1	Søren Kragh Andersen (DEN)	Alpecin–Deceuninck	8h 21' 59"
2	Corbin Strong (NZL)	Israel–Premier Tech	+ 2"
3	Alex Aranburu (ESP)	Movistar Team	+ 8"
4	Quinten Hermans (BEL)	Alpecin–Deceuninck	+ 9"
5	Alex Kirsch (LUX)	Lidl–Trek	+ 11"
6	Andrea Bagioli (ITA)	Soudal–Quick-Step	+ 12"
7	Rick Pluimers (NED)	Tudor Pro Cycling Team	+ 12"
8	Giulio Ciccone (ITA)	Lidl–Trek	+ 12"
9	Maxim Van Gils (BEL)	Lotto–Dstny	+ 12"
10	Ilan Van Wilder (BEL)	Soudal–Quick-Step	+ 12"

=== Stage 3 ===
22 September 2023 — Mertert to Vianden, 186.4 km (115.8 mi)

Stage 3 Result
Rank	Rider	Team	Time
1	Ben Healy (IRL)	EF Education–EasyPost	4h 16' 33"
2	Marc Hirschi (SUI)	UAE Team Emirates	+ 15"
3	Dylan Teuns (BEL)	Israel–Premier Tech	+ 18"
4	Maxim Van Gils (BEL)	Lotto–Dstny	+ 37"
5	Brandon McNulty (USA)	UAE Team Emirates	+ 37"
6	Archie Ryan (IRL)	Team Jumbo–Visma	+ 37"
7	Matteo Jorgenson (USA)	Movistar Team	+ 37"
8	Søren Kragh Andersen (DEN)	Alpecin–Deceuninck	+ 45"
9	Richard Carapaz (ECU)	EF Education–EasyPost	+ 45"
10	Tiesj Benoot (BEL)	Team Jumbo–Visma	+ 45"

General classification after Stage 3
Rank	Rider	Team	Time
1	Ben Healy (IRL)	EF Education–EasyPost	12h 38' 34"
2	Marc Hirschi (SUI)	UAE Team Emirates	+ 19"
3	Dylan Teuns (BEL)	Israel–Premier Tech	+ 24"
4	Søren Kragh Andersen (DEN)	Alpecin–Deceuninck	+ 43"
5	Maxim Van Gils (BEL)	Lotto–Dstny	+ 47"
6	Brandon McNulty (USA)	UAE Team Emirates	+ 47"
7	Matteo Jorgenson (USA)	Movistar Team	+ 47"
8	Ilan Van Wilder (BEL)	Soudal–Quick-Step	+ 55"
9	Richard Carapaz (ECU)	EF Education–EasyPost	+ 55"
10	Tiesj Benoot (BEL)	Team Jumbo–Visma	+ 55"

=== Stage 4 ===
23 September 2023 — Pétange to Pétange, 23.9 km (14.9 mi) (ITT)

Stage 4 Result
Rank	Rider	Team	Time
1	Victor Campenaerts (BEL)	Lotto–Dstny	28' 06"
2	Brandon McNulty (USA)	UAE Team Emirates	+ 1"
3	Diego Ulissi (ITA)	UAE Team Emirates	+ 20"
4	Felix Großschartner (AUT)	UAE Team Emirates	+ 22"
5	Ilan Van Wilder (BEL)	Soudal–Quick-Step	+ 24"
6	Koen Bouwman (NED)	Team Jumbo–Visma	+ 24"
7	Marc Hirschi (SUI)	UAE Team Emirates	+ 27"
8	Ben O'Connor (AUS)	AG2R Citroën Team	+ 27"
9	Alex Kirsch (LUX)	Lidl–Trek	+ 32"
10	Arthur Kluckers (LUX)	Tudor Pro Cycling Team	+ 41"

General classification after Stage 4
Rank	Rider	Team	Time
1	Marc Hirschi (SUI)	UAE Team Emirates	13h 07' 26"
2	Brandon McNulty (USA)	UAE Team Emirates	+ 2"
3	Ben Healy (IRL)	EF Education–EasyPost	+ 3"
4	Diego Ulissi (ITA)	UAE Team Emirates	+ 33"
5	Ilan Van Wilder (BEL)	Soudal–Quick-Step	+ 33"
6	Felix Großschartner (AUT)	UAE Team Emirates	+ 37"
7	Koen Bouwman (NED)	Team Jumbo–Visma	+ 39"
8	Ben O'Connor (AUS)	AG2R Citroën Team	+ 42"
9	Søren Kragh Andersen (DEN)	Alpecin–Deceuninck	+ 45"
10	Arthur Kluckers (LUX)	Tudor Pro Cycling Team	+ 56"

=== Stage 5 ===
24 September 2023 — Mersch to Luxembourg Limpertsberg, 177.2 km (110.1 mi)

Stage 5 Result
Rank	Rider	Team	Time
1	Tobias Halland Johannessen (NOR)	Uno-X Pro Cycling Team	4h 07' 25"
2	Alex Aranburu (ESP)	Movistar Team	+ 8"
3	Franck Bonnamour (FRA)	AG2R Citroën Team	+ 8"
4	Valentin Madouas (FRA)	Groupama–FDJ	+ 8"
5	Mauri Vansevenant (BEL)	Soudal–Quick-Step	+ 8"
6	Ewen Costiou (FRA)	Arkéa–Samsic	+ 8"
7	Natnael Tesfatsion (ERI)	Lidl–Trek	+ 8"
8	Sam Oomen (NED)	Team Jumbo–Visma	+ 8"
9	Luca Vergallito (ITA)	Alpecin–Deceuninck	+ 8"
10	Felix Gall (AUT)	AG2R Citroën Team	+ 8"

General classification after Stage 5
Rank	Rider	Team	Time
1	Marc Hirschi (SUI)	UAE Team Emirates	17h 15' 11"
2	Brandon McNulty (USA)	UAE Team Emirates	+ 3"
3	Ben Healy (IRL)	EF Education–EasyPost	+ 5"
4	Ilan Van Wilder (BEL)	Soudal–Quick-Step	+ 34"
5	Diego Ulissi (ITA)	UAE Team Emirates	+ 35"
6	Søren Kragh Andersen (DEN)	Alpecin–Deceuninck	+ 39"
7	Felix Großschartner (AUT)	UAE Team Emirates	+ 39"
8	Koen Bouwman (NED)	Team Jumbo–Visma	+ 41"
9	Ben O'Connor (AUS)	AG2R Citroën Team	+ 44"
10	Maxim Van Gils (BEL)	Lotto–Dstny	+ 57"

== Classification leadership table ==
Classification leadership by stage
Stage	Winner	General classification	Points classification	Mountains classification	Young rider classification	Team classification
1	Corbin Strong	Corbin Strong	Corbin Strong	Mats Wenzel	Corbin Strong	Soudal–Quick-Step
2	Jenthe Biermans	Søren Kragh Andersen	Søren Kragh Andersen	Mats Wenzel	Corbin Strong	Soudal–Quick-Step
3	Ben Healy	Ben Healy	Søren Kragh Andersen	Mats Wenzel	Ben Healy	UAE Team Emirates
4	Victor Campenaerts	Marc Hirschi	Søren Kragh Andersen	Mats Wenzel	Marc Hirschi	UAE Team Emirates
5	Tobias Halland Johannessen	Marc Hirschi	Søren Kragh Andersen	Mats Wenzel	Marc Hirschi	UAE Team Emirates
Final		Marc Hirschi	Søren Kragh Andersen	Mats Wenzel	Marc Hirschi	UAE Team Emirates

== Classification standings ==
Legend
Denotes the winner of the general classification	Denotes the winner of the mountains classification
Denotes the winner of the points classification	Denotes the winner of the young rider classification

=== General classification ===
Final general classification (1–10)
Rank	Rider	Team	Time
1	Marc Hirschi (SUI)	UAE Team Emirates	17h 15' 11"
2	Brandon McNulty (USA)	UAE Team Emirates	+ 3"
3	Ben Healy (IRL)	EF Education–EasyPost	+ 5"
4	Ilan Van Wilder (BEL)	Soudal–Quick-Step	+ 34"
5	Diego Ulissi (ITA)	UAE Team Emirates	+ 35"
6	Søren Kragh Andersen (DEN)	Alpecin–Deceuninck	+ 39"
7	Felix Großschartner (AUT)	UAE Team Emirates	+ 39"
8	Koen Bouwman (NED)	Team Jumbo–Visma	+ 41"
9	Ben O'Connor (AUS)	AG2R Citroën Team	+ 44"
10	Maxim Van Gils (BEL)	Lotto–Dstny	+ 57"

=== Points classification ===
Final points classification (1–10)
Rank	Rider	Team	Points
1	Søren Kragh Andersen (DEN)	Alpecin–Deceuninck	41
2	Alex Aranburu (ESP)	Movistar Team	34
3	Brandon McNulty (USA)	UAE Team Emirates	27
4	Marc Hirschi (SUI)	UAE Team Emirates	25
5	Diego Ulissi (ITA)	UAE Team Emirates	24
6	Ben Healy (IRL)	EF Education–EasyPost	20
7	Tobias Halland Johannessen (NOR)	Uno-X Pro Cycling Team	20
8	Victor Campenaerts (BEL)	Lotto–Dstny	20
9	Corbin Strong (NZL)	Israel–Premier Tech	20
10	Jenthe Biermans (BEL)	Arkéa–Samsic	20

=== Mountains classification ===
Final mountains classification (1–10)
Rank	Rider	Team	Points
1	Mats Wenzel (LUX)	Leopard TOGT Pro Cycling	26
2	Lennert Teugels (BEL)	Bingoal WB	22
3	Bastien Tronchon (FRA)	AG2R Citroën Team	12
4	Ben Healy (IRL)	EF Education–EasyPost	10
5	Luca Van Boven (BEL)	Bingoal WB	6
6	Vito Braet (BEL)	Team Flanders–Baloise	6
7	Alexis Guérin (FRA)	Bingoal WB	5
8	Krists Neilands (LAT)	Israel–Premier Tech	4
9	Oliver Knight (GBR)	Cofidis	4
10	Marco Haller (AUT)	Bora–Hansgrohe	4

=== Young rider classification ===
Final young rider classification (1–10)
Rank	Rider	Team	Time
1	Marc Hirschi (SUI)	UAE Team Emirates	17h 15' 11"
2	Brandon McNulty (USA)	UAE Team Emirates	+ 3"
3	Ben Healy (IRL)	EF Education–EasyPost	+ 5"
4	Ilan Van Wilder (BEL)	Soudal–Quick-Step	+ 34"
5	Maxim Van Gils (BEL)	Lotto–Dstny	+ 57"
6	Arthur Kluckers (LUX)	Tudor Pro Cycling Team	+ 58"
7	Matteo Jorgenson (USA)	Movistar Team	+ 1' 08"
8	Tobias Halland Johannessen (NOR)	Uno-X Pro Cycling Team	+ 1' 14"
9	Brent Van Moer (BEL)	Lotto–Dstny	+ 1' 20"
10	Ewen Costiou (FRA)	Arkéa–Samsic	+ 1' 28"

=== Team classification ===
Final team classification (1–10)
Rank	Team	Time
1	(United Arab Emirates) UAE Team Emirates	51h 46' 15"
2	(Belgium) Soudal–Quick-Step	+ 2' 46"
3	(Netherlands) Team Jumbo–Visma	+ 3' 08"
4	(France) AG2R Citroën Team	+ 3' 45"
5	Israel–Premier Tech	+ 4' 53"
6	(Spain) Movistar Team	+ 8' 43"
7	(Belgium) Lotto–Dstny	+ 10' 29"
8	(United States) Lidl–Trek	+ 12' 32"
9	(Belgium) Alpecin–Deceuninck	+ 13' 04"
10	(Norway) Uno-X Pro Cycling Team	+ 14' 31"
