= Archie Ryan =

Archie Ryan may refer to:

- Archie Ryan (cyclist) (born 2001), Irish professional racing cyclist
- Archie Ryan (Prison Break), or Lincoln Burrows, a fictional character in the TV series Prison Break
