= Francesco Busatto =

Italian cyclist

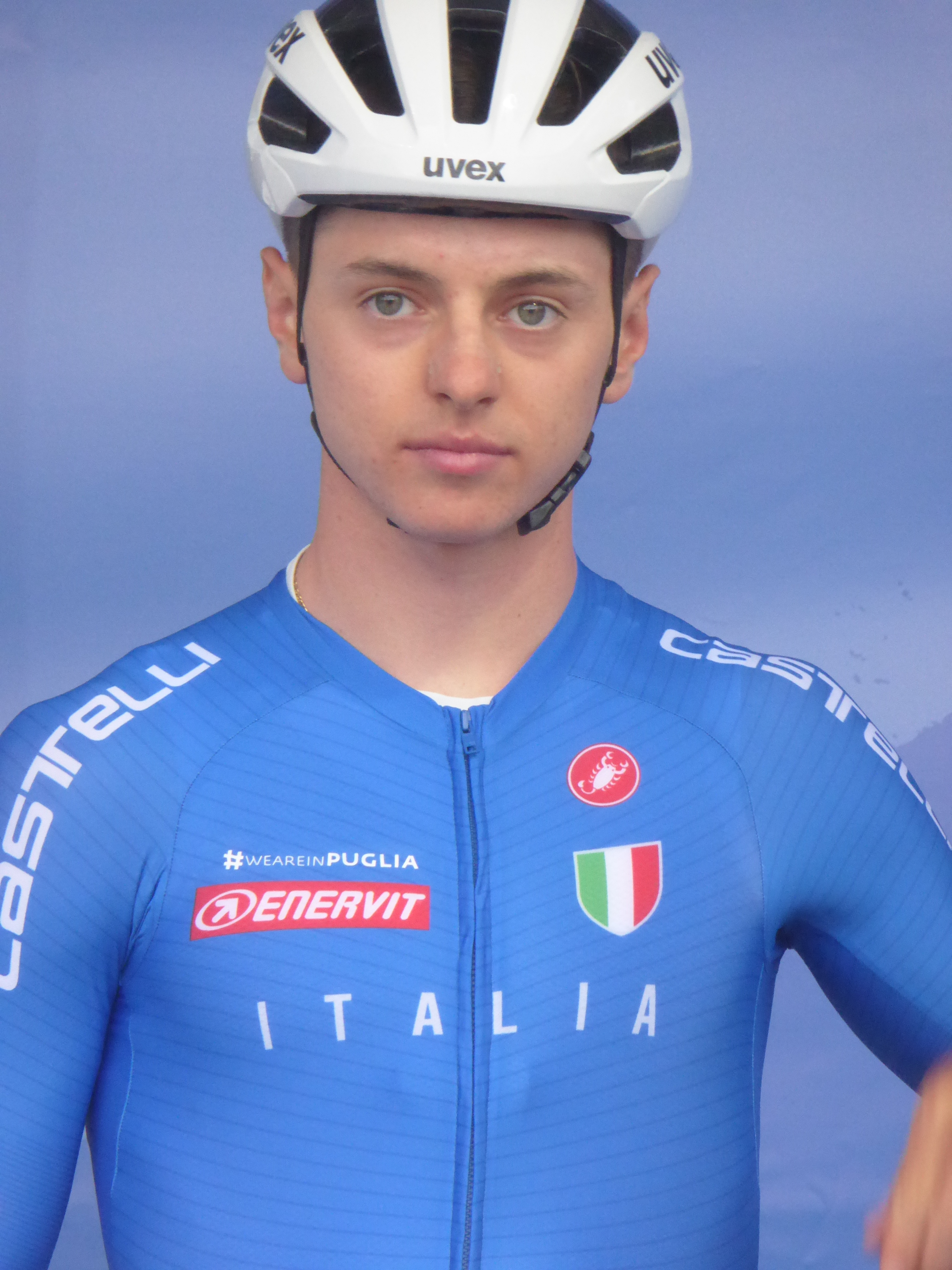
- Busatto in 2023

Personal information
- Born: 1 November 2002 (age 23) Bassano Del Grappa, Italy
- Height: 1.72 m (5 ft 8 in)
- Weight: 62 kg (137 lb)

Cycling career
- Sport: Cycling
- Current team: Alpecin–Premier Tech
- Discipline: Road
- Role: Rider

Amateur teams
- 2019: Breganze Wilier Team
- 2020: Guadense Rotogal
- 2021: UC Trevigiani–Campana Imballaggi

Professional teams
- 2022: General Store–Essegibi–Fratelli Curia
- 2023: Circus–ReUz–Technord
- 2024–2025: Intermarché–Wanty
- 2026–: Alpecin–Premier Tech

Francesco Busatto (born 1 November 2002) is an Italian professional road cyclist, who currently rides for UCI WorldTeam Alpecin–Premier Tech.

== Major results ==
2021
2nd Milano-Busseto
3rd Piccola Sanremo
2022
2nd Gran Premio Industrie del Marmo
4th Coppa della Pace
5th Il Piccolo Lombardia
6th Overall Giro della Friuli Venezia Giulia
7th Veneto Classic
2023
1st Liège–Bastogne–Liège Espoirs
1st Stage 3 Orlen Nations Grand Prix
2nd Flèche Ardennaise
2nd La Get Up Cup
4th Giro dell'Appennino
4th Muscat Classic
6th Overall Circuit des Ardennes
7th Road race, UEC European Under-23 Road Championships
2024
4th Volta NXT Classic
5th Muscat Classic
8th Gran Piemonte
8th Veneto Classic
9th Coppa Bernocchi
2025
10th Coppa Bernocchi
Giro d'Italia

Held after Stage 1

2026
9th Cadel Evans Great Ocean Road Race

=== Grand Tour general classification results timeline ===
Grand Tour	2025	2026
Giro d'Italia	99	81
Tour de France	—	
Vuelta a España	—	

Legend
—	Did not compete
DNF	Did not finish
IP	Race in Progress
