= 2020 Trofeo Laigueglia =

2020 UCI Europe Tour 2020 UCI ProSeries

Race details
- Dates: 16 February 2020
- Stages: 1
- Distance: 203.7 km (126.6 mi)
- Winning time: 5h 10' 27"

Results
	Winner	Giulio Ciccone (ITA)	(Italy)
	Second	Biniam Girmay (ERI)	(Nippo–Delko–One Provence)
	Third	Diego Rosa (ITA)	(Arkéa–Samsic)

The 2020 Trofeo Laigueglia was a one-day road cycling race that took place on 16 February 2020 in and around Laigueglia. It was the 57th edition of the Trofeo Laigueglia and was rated as a 1.Pro event as part of the 2020 UCI Europe Tour and the 2020 UCI ProSeries.

The race was won by Giulio Ciccone racing for the Italian national team.

== Teams ==
Nineteen teams were invited to the race. Along with an Italian national team, there was one UCI WorldTour team, seven UCI Professional Continental teams, and ten UCI Continental teams. Each team entered up to seven riders, with the exceptions of AG2R La Mondiale, Androni Giocattoli–Sidermec, Bardiani–CSF–Faizanè, and NTT Continental Cycling Team, which each entered six riders, and Amore & Vita–Prodir, which only entered five. Of the starting peloton of 127 riders, only 56 finished.

UCI WorldTeams

- AG2R La Mondiale

UCI Professional Continental Teams

- Androni Giocattoli–Sidermec
- Arkéa–Samsic
- Bardiani–CSF–Faizanè
- Gazprom–RusVelo
- Nippo–Delko–One Provence
- Riwal Readynez
- Vini Zabù–KTM

UCI Continental Teams

- Amore & Vita–Prodir
- D'Amico–UM Tools
- Beltrami TSA–Marchiol
- Biesse–Arvedi
- General Store–Essegibi–Fratelli Curia
- Giotti Victoria
- NTT Continental Cycling Team
- Efapel
- Team Colpack–Ballan
- Work Service–Dinatek–Vega

National Teams

- Italy

== Result ==
Result
Rank	Rider	Team	Time
1	Giulio Ciccone (ITA)	Italy	5h 10' 27"
2	Biniam Girmay (ERI)	Nippo–Delko–One Provence	+ 32"
3	Diego Rosa (ITA)	Arkéa–Samsic	+ 32"
4	Andrea Vendrame (ITA)	AG2R La Mondiale	+ 1' 17"
5	Lorenzo Rota (ITA)	Vini Zabù–KTM	+ 1' 17"
6	Evgeny Shalunov (RUS)	Gazprom–RusVelo	+ 1' 17"
7	Davide Gabburo (ITA)	Androni Giocattoli–Sidermec	+ 1' 21"
8	Marco Tizza (ITA)	Amore & Vita–Prodir	+ 1' 48"
9	Andreas Kron (DEN)	Riwal Readynez	+ 1' 55"
10	Filippo Conca (ITA)	Biesse–Arvedi	+ 1' 55"
