= 2023 Coppa Sabatini =

- 2023 UCI ProSeries

Race details
- Dates: 14 September 2023
- Stages: 1
- Distance: 198.9 km (123.6 mi)
- Winning time: 4h 47' 15"

Results
	Winner	Marc Hirschi (SUI)	(UAE Team Emirates)
	Second	Pavel Sivakov (FRA)	(Ineos Grenadiers)
	Third	Tadej Pogačar (SLO)	(UAE Team Emirates)

The 2023 Coppa Sabatini (also known as the Gran Premio città di Peccioli) was the 71st edition of the Coppa Sabatini road cycling one day race, which was held on 14 September 2023 as part of the 2023 UCI ProSeries calendar.

== Teams ==
Seven of the 18 UCI WorldTeams, six UCI ProTeams, and five UCI Continental teams made up the eighteen teams that participated in the race.

UCI WorldTeams

- Astana Qazaqstan Team
- Cofidis
- EF Education–EasyPost
- Ineos Grenadiers
- Intermarché–Circus–Wanty
- Team Jayco–AlUla
- UAE Team Emirates

UCI ProTeams

- Team Corratec–Selle Italia
- Eolo–Kometa
- Euskaltel–Euskadi
- Green Project–Bardiani–CSF–Faizanè
- Q36.5 Pro Cycling Team
- Team TotalEnergies

UCI Continental Teams

- Electro Hiper Europa
- GW Shimano–Sidermec
- MG.K vis Colors for Peace
- Team Technipes #inEmiliaRomagna
- Work Service–Vitalcare–Dynatek

== Result ==
Result
Rank	Rider	Team	Time
1	Marc Hirschi (SUI)	UAE Team Emirates	4h 47' 15"
2	Pavel Sivakov (FRA)	Ineos Grenadiers	+ 2"
3	Tadej Pogačar (SLO)	UAE Team Emirates	+ 18"
4	Guillaume Martin (FRA)	Cofidis	+ 18"
5	Alexey Lutsenko (KAZ)	Astana Qazaqstan Team	+ 18"
6	Walter Calzoni (ITA)	Q36.5 Pro Cycling Team	+ 2' 10"
7	Richard Carapaz (ECU)	EF Education–EasyPost	+ 2' 17"
8	Michael Valgren (DEN)	EF Education–EasyPost	+ 3' 54"
9	George Bennett (NZL)	UAE Team Emirates	+ 4' 45"
10	Mathieu Burgaudeau (FRA)	Team TotalEnergies	+ 6' 04"
