= Muur Classic Geraardsbergen =

Race details
- Date: August
- Region: Geraardsbergen, Belgium
- Discipline: Road
- Competition: UCI Europe Tour
- Type: One-day race
- Web site: www.muurclassic.be

History
- First edition: 2023
- Editions: 4 (as of 2026)
- First winner: Filippo Magli (ITA)
- Most wins: No repeat winners
- Most recent: Paul Magnier (FRA)

The Muur Classic Geraardsbergen is a one-day road cycling race held annually in Geraardsbergen, Belgium since 2023. It is rated as a 1.1 category event on the UCI Europe Tour, having upgraded from 1.2 status in 2024.

== Winners ==
| Year | Country | Rider | Team |
|---|---|---|---|
| 2023 | Italy | Filippo Magli | Green Project–Bardiani–CSF–Faizanè |
| 2024 | Belgium | Jenno Berckmoes | Lotto–Dstny |
| 2025 | Norway | Jonas Abrahamsen | Uno-X Mobility |
| 2026 | France | Paul Magnier | Soudal–Quick-Step |
