= Marc Hirschi =

Swiss cyclist (born 1998)

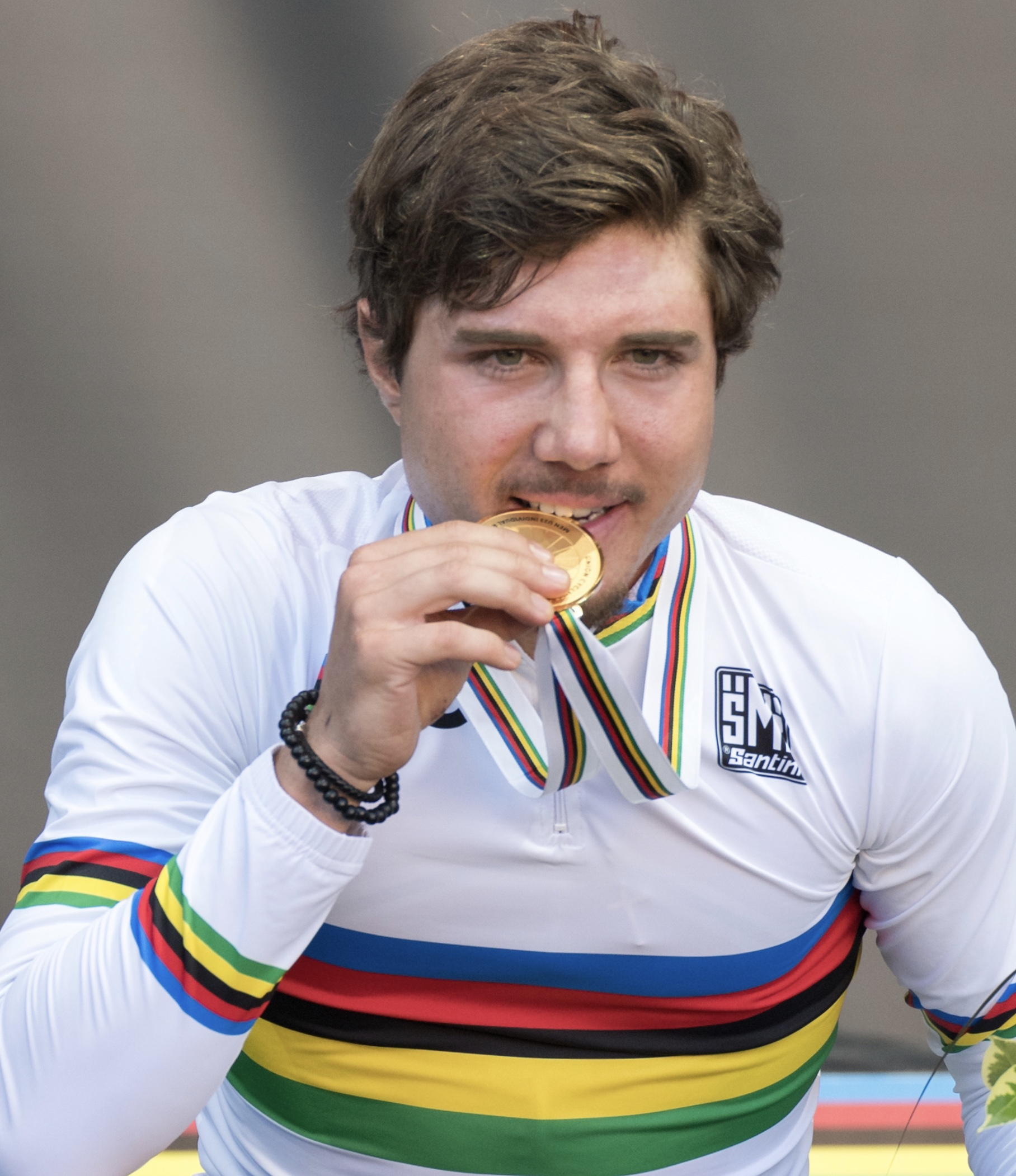
- Hirschi in 2018

Personal information
- Full name: Marc Hirschi
- Nickname: Interrail
- Born: 24 August 1998 (age 28) Ittigen, Switzerland
- Height: 1.74 m (5 ft 9 in)
- Weight: 61 kg (134 lb)

Cycling career
- Sport: Cycling
- Current team: Tudor Pro Cycling Team
- Discipline: Road
- Role: Rider
- Rider type: Puncheur

Amateur team
- 2017: BMC Development Team

Professional teams
- 2018: Development Team Sunweb
- 2019–2021: Team Sunweb
- 2021–2024: UAE Team Emirates
- 2025–: Tudor Pro Cycling Team

Major wins
- Grand Tours Tour de France 1 individual stage (2020) Combativity award (2020) Stage races Tour de Hongrie (2023) Tour de Luxembourg (2023) One-day races and Classics National Road Race Championships (2023) Bretagne Classic (2024) Clásica de San Sebastián (2024) La Flèche Wallonne (2020) Coppa Sabatini (2023, 2024) GP Industria & Artigianato (2024) La Drôme Classic (2024) Veneto Classic (2022)
Medal record
Representing Switzerland
Men's road bicycle racing
World Championships
Gold medal – first place	2018 Innsbruck	Under-23 road race
Bronze medal – third place	2020 Imola	Elite road race
European Championships
Gold medal – first place	2018 Brno	Under-23 road race
Silver medal – second place	2016 Plumelec	Junior time trial
Bronze medal – third place	2017 Herning	Under-23 road race
Men's track cycling
Junior World Championships
Gold medal – first place	2016 Aigle	Madison

Marc Hirschi (born 24 August 1998) is a Swiss cyclist, who currently rides for UCI ProTeam Tudor Pro Cycling Team. Hirschi is known for his skills as a puncheur and one-day specialist, with wins in the hilly classics Clásica de San Sebastián and La Flèche Wallonne. He is also a Swiss national champion in the road race.

== Career ==
=== Early career ===
Hirschi began competing in cycling at the age of 11, inspired both by his father's passion for the sport and by the success of Fabian Cancellara, who hails from the same region as Hirschi. He initially competed in mountain biking, before also practicing road, track and cyclo-cross as a teenager. He was a two-time national junior road race champion, winning in 2015 and 2016. In 2017, he was recruited by the BMC Development Team for his first season in the under-23 category, joining Development Team Sunweb the year after.

In September 2018 it was announced that he would join Team Sunweb from 2019 on a three-year contract, having been a member of Development Team Sunweb in 2018. In the same month, Hirschi won the under-23 road race at the UCI Road World Championships in Innsbruck, Austria.

=== Team Sunweb (2019–2021) ===
During his first professional season in 2019, Hirschi finished third in the Clásica de San Sebastián.

In 2020, Hirschi had a breakout year: after starting the Tour de France for the first time, he won a stage, three combative rider awards for his performances on individual stages and the overall Combativity award. One week after the end of the Tour, he took the bronze medal in the Men's road race at the Road World Championships in Imola. Three days later Hirschi took the win at La Flèche Wallonne, pulling away from the rest of the lead group in the last 50 metres of the final climb of the Mur de Huy. He was the first Swiss rider to win the race since Ferdinand Kübler in 1952. Several days later, he also finished second to Primož Roglič at Liège–Bastogne–Liège.

In January 2021, Hirschi's contract with Team DSM was abruptly terminated, leaving Hirschi as a free agent. No comment was given by Hirschi or Team DSM, other than that the contract was ended with mutual consent. Days later, Hirschi signed a three-year contract with UAE Team Emirates.

=== UAE Team Emirates (2021-2024) ===
In his first season with the team, Hirschi took only one victory: stage two of the Tour de Luxembourg, going on to finish second overall.

He opened the 2022 season in late March with a win at the Per sempre Alfredo race in Italy. In June, he won the Grosser Preis des Kantons Aargau. The following month, he was selected for the Tour de France only two days before the start of race after Matteo Trentin was forced to withdraw after testing positive for SARS-CoV-2. Hirschi took two more wins in Italy towards the end of the season at the Giro della Toscana and the Veneto Classic.

Hirschi started 2023 in Australia, finishing eighth in the Cadel Evans Great Ocean Road Race. In February, he crashed on the first stage of the Volta ao Algarve, fracturing a radius. He returned to competition at the end of March. In May, he finished fourth at Eschborn–Frankfurt, before winning stage three of the Tour de Hongrie, taking the race lead in the process. Hirschi was able to hold on to the race lead for the remainder of the race, marking his first stage race victory. In June, he became the Swiss National Road Race Champion for the first time. In September, he won the Coppa Sabatini and the Tour de Luxembourg, both events on the UCI ProSeries calendar.

In February 2024, he won the La Drôme Classic, his fourth race of the season, after a late attack. In April, he placed second to Tom Pidcock at the Amstel Gold Race. In August, Hirschi beat Julian Alaphillipe in a two-up sprint to win the Clásica de San Sebastián. This started a run of five-straight one-day victories for Hirschi, as he won 2024 Bretagne Classic Ouest-France, GP Industria & Artigianato di Larciano, Coppa Sabatini, and Memorial Marco Pantani. Hirschi ended the season with nine professional wins, his most in a single season.

== Major results ==
=== Road ===
2014
3rd Road race, National Junior Championships
2015
National Junior Championships

1st Road race
3rd Time trial

1st Overall Grand Prix Rüebliland

1st Young rider classification
1st Stage 1

1st Overall GP Général Patton
5th Trofeo Emilio Paganessi
UEC European Junior Championships

5th Road race
7th Time trial

8th Overall Oberösterreich Juniorenrundfahrt
9th Road race, UCI World Junior Championships
2016
1st Road race, National Junior Championships
1st Overall Tour du Pays de Vaud
1st Trofeo Emilio Paganessi
2nd Time trial, UEC European Junior Championships
3rd Overall Grand Prix Rüebliland

1st Stage 3

3rd Overall GP Général Patton

1st Points classification

3rd Gent–Wevelgem Juniors
5th Trofeo Buffoni
6th Paris–Roubaix Juniors
8th Time trial, UCI World Junior Championships
2017
1st Time trial, National Under-23 Championships
1st Tour du Jura
1st Mountains classification, Le Triptyque des Monts et Chateaux
UEC European Under-23 Championships

3rd Road race
8th Time trial

6th Piccolo Giro di Lombardia
7th Ronde van Vlaanderen Beloften
2018
1st Road race, UCI World Under-23 Championships
UEC European Under-23 Championships

1st Road race
5th Time trial

2nd Overall Tour Alsace

1st Stage 3

3rd Overall Grand Prix Priessnitz spa

1st Stage 2

National Under-23 Championships

3rd Road race
4th Time trial

4th Overall Tour de l'Ain

1st Young rider classification

5th Overall Istrian Spring Trophy

1st Stage 2

5th Liège–Bastogne–Liège Espoirs
5th Eschborn–Frankfurt Under-23
6th Ronde van Vlaanderen Beloften
8th Coppa Ugo Agostoni
10th Overall Tour de Savoie Mont Blanc
10th Tour du Doubs
10th Tacx Pro Classic
2019
National Championships

2nd Time trial
4th Road race

3rd Clásica de San Sebastián
5th Overall BinckBank Tour
6th Overall Deutschland Tour

1st Young rider classification

10th E3 Binckbank Classic
2020 (2 pro wins)
1st La Flèche Wallonne
Tour de France

1st Stage 12
Held after Stages 2–3
Combativity award Stages 9, 12, 18 & Overall

2nd Liège–Bastogne–Liège
3rd Road race, UCI World Championships
2021 (1)
2nd Time trial, National Championships
2nd Overall Tour de Luxembourg

1st Stage 2

2nd Veneto Classic
5th Brussels Cycling Classic
6th Road race, UEC European Championships
6th Liège–Bastogne–Liège
10th Druivenkoers Overijse
2022 (4)
1st Giro della Toscana
1st Grand Prix of Aargau Canton
1st Per sempre Alfredo
1st Veneto Classic
3rd Overall Settimana Internazionale di Coppi e Bartali
8th GP Miguel Induráin
9th Liège–Bastogne–Liège
9th Amstel Gold Race
9th GP Industria & Artigianato
9th Coppa Sabatini
2023 (7)
1st Road race, National Championships
1st Overall Tour de Hongrie

1st Stage 3

1st Overall Tour de Luxembourg

1st Young rider classification

1st Coppa Sabatini
1st Giro dell'Appennino
1st Prueba Villafranca de Ordizia
2nd Gran Piemonte
2nd Veneto Classic
2nd Grosser Preis des Kantons Aargau
2nd Memorial Marco Pantani
2nd Coppa Agostoni
4th Eschborn–Frankfurt
4th Coppa Bernocchi
4th Clásica Jaén Paraíso Interior
5th Giro del Veneto
5th Trofeo Matteotti
6th Overall Renewi Tour
6th Bretagne Classic
8th Cadel Evans Great Ocean Road Race
8th Grand Prix Cycliste de Québec
10th Liège–Bastogne–Liège
10th Hamburg Cyclassics
10th Grand Prix Cycliste de Montréal
2024 (9)
1st Overall Czech Tour

1st Points classification
1st Stage 2

1st Bretagne Classic
1st Clásica de San Sebastián
1st Coppa Sabatini
1st GP Industria & Artigianato di Larciano
1st La Drôme Classic
1st Memorial Marco Pantani
1st Coppa Agostoni
2nd Amstel Gold Race
3rd Milano–Torino
3rd Circuit Franco-Belge
4th Veneto Classic
5th Overall Tour de Hongrie
5th Road race, National Championships
5th Giro del Veneto
6th Overall Tour de Luxembourg
6th Overall Boucles de la Mayenne
6th Road race, UCI World Championships
6th Figueira Champions Classic
9th Eschborn–Frankfurt
2025 (1)
1st Clàssica Comunitat Valenciana 1969
2nd Road race, National Championships
2nd Gran Piemonte
4th La Drôme Classic
5th Overall Tour de Luxembourg
5th Trofeo Calvià
6th Coppa Sabatini
6th GP Miguel Induráin
7th GP Industria & Artigianato di Larciano
8th Eschborn–Frankfurt
8th Trofeo Serra Tramuntana
2026
3rd Overall Deutschland Tour
5th Tre Valli Varesine
5th Veneto Classic
7th Figueira Champions Classic
8th Clásica de San Sebastián

==== Grand Tour general classification results timeline ====
Grand Tour	2020	2021	2022	2023	2024	2025	2026
Giro d'Italia	—	—	—	—	—	—	—
Tour de France	54	98	126	—	—	78	48
Vuelta a España	—	—	—	—	—	—	—

==== Classics results timeline ====
Monument	2019	2020	2021	2022	2023	2024	2025	2026
Milan–San Remo	48	—	—	—	—	112	—	—
Tour of Flanders	—	—	—	—	—	DNF	—	—
Paris–Roubaix	—	NH	—	—	—	—	—	—
Liège–Bastogne–Liège	51	2	6	9	10	17	45	—
Giro di Lombardia	DNF	—	36	81	19	44	27	
Classic	2019	2020	2021	2022	2023	2024	2025	2026
Strade Bianche	73	DNF	—	—	—	68	24	—
Milano–Torino	19	—	46	—	—	3	14	—
E3 Saxo Bank Classic	10	NH	—	—	—	DNF	—	—
Amstel Gold Race	54	NH	35	9	36	2	40	DNF
La Flèche Wallonne	—	1	—	32	80	DNF	49	DNF
Eschborn–Frankfurt	—	NH	—	—	4	9	8	—
Clásica de San Sebastián	3	NH	—	—	13	1	25	8
Hamburg Cyclassics	21	NH	NH	—	10	—	27	—
Bretagne Classic	—	—	—	—	6	1	44	66
Grand Prix Cycliste de Québec	62	Not held		—	8	—	—	DNF
Grand Prix Cycliste de Montréal	58	Not held		—	10	—	—	27
Tre Valli Varesine	—	—	13	—	—	NR	—	5
Gran Piemonte	—	—	—	125	2	—	2	

Legend
—	Did not compete
DNF	Did not finish

=== Track ===
2016
1st Madison, UCI World Junior Championships (with Reto Müller)
1st Madison, National Championships (with Reto Müller)
2017
3rd Team pursuit, National Championships
