= 2024 Veneto Classic =

2024 UCI ProSeries

Race details
- Dates: 20 October 2024
- Stages: 1
- Distance: 191.7 km (119.1 mi)
- Winning time: 4h 24' 02"

Results
	Winner	Magnus Cort (DEN)	(Uno-X Mobility)
	Second	Romain Grégoire (FRA)	(Groupama–FDJ)
	Third	Xandro Meurisse (BEL)	(Alpecin–Deceuninck)

The 2024 Veneto Classic was the 4th edition of the Veneto Classic single-day cycling race. It was held on 20 October 2024, over a distance of 191.7 km, starting in Soave and ending in Bassano del Grappa.

The race was won by Magnus Cort of Uno-X Mobility.

== Teams ==
Nine UCI WorldTeams, six UCI ProTeams, and three UCI Continental teams made up the eighteen teams that participated in the race.

UCI WorldTeams

- Alpecin–Deceuninck
- Arkéa–B&B Hotels
- Astana Qazaqstan Team
- Cofidis
- Groupama–FDJ
- Intermarché–Wanty
- Movistar Team
- Team Jayco–AlUla
- UAE Team Emirates

UCI ProTeams

- Israel–Premier Tech
- Polti–Kometa
- Q36.5 Pro Cycling Team
- Team Corratec–Vini Fantini
- Uno-X Mobility
- VF Group–Bardiani–CSF–Faizanè

UCI Continental teams

- Biesse–Carrera
- General Store–Essegibi–Fratelli Curia
- MG.K vis Colors for Peace

== Results ==
Result
Rank	Rider	Team	Time
1	Magnus Cort (DEN)	Uno-X Mobility	4h 24' 02"
2	Romain Grégoire (FRA)	Groupama–FDJ	+ 17"
3	Xandro Meurisse (BEL)	Alpecin–Deceuninck	+ 19"
4	Marc Hirschi (SUI)	UAE Team Emirates	+ 20"
5	Filippo Zana (ITA)	Team Jayco–AlUla	+ 21"
6	Giulio Pellizzari (ITA)	VF Group–Bardiani–CSF–Faizanè	+ 23"
7	Filippo Baroncini (ITA)	UAE Team Emirates	+ 39"
8	Francesco Busatto (ITA)	Intermarché–Wanty	+ 41"
9	Georg Zimmermann (GER)	Intermarché–Wanty	+ 49"
10	Davide De Pretto (ITA)	Team Jayco–AlUla	+ 54"
