= Maxim Van Gils =

Belgian cyclist (born 1999)

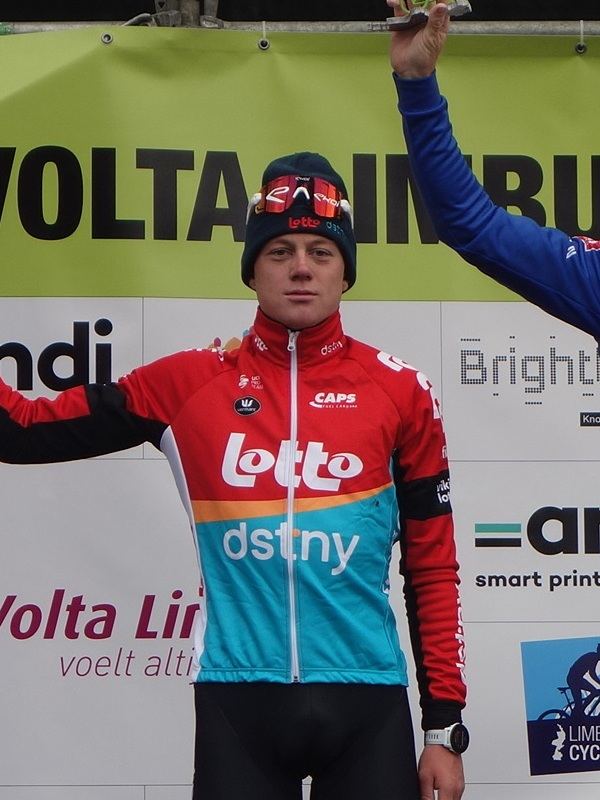
- Van Gils, Volta Limburg Classic, April 2023

Personal information
- Born: 25 November 1999 (age 26) Brasschaat, Belgium
- Height: 1.74 m (5 ft 9 in)
- Weight: 63 kg (139 lb)

Cycling career
- Sport: Cycling
- Current team: Red Bull–Bora–Hansgrohe
- Discipline: Road
- Role: Rider
- Rider type: Climber, classics specialist

Amateur teams
- 2016–2017: WAC Hoboken
- 2018–2020: Lotto–Soudal U23

Professional teams
- 2021–2024: Lotto–Soudal
- 2025–: Red Bull–Bora–Hansgrohe

Major wins
- One-day races and Classics Eschborn–Frankfurt (2024)

Maxim Van Gils (born 25 November 1999) is a Belgian cyclist, who currently rides for UCI WorldTeam Red Bull–Bora–Hansgrohe.

== Career ==
=== Lotto–Soudal (2021–2024) ===
Professional since 2021, Van Gils took his first pro win at the 2022 Saudi Tour, winning stage four and the general classification. Considered a strong climber and classics rider, he has also taken a number of top 10 and podium finishes at classic races, including third places at the 2024 Strade Bianche and the 2024 La Flèche Wallonne. He also won the 5 kilometer time trial at the 2024 Vuelta a Andalucía. In May, he won his first UCI WorldTour race, winning a group sprint at Eschborn–Frankfurt.

At the 2023 Japan Cup, Van Gils received a fine and was penalized 10 UCI points after hitting Georgios Bouglas just after crossing the finish line. He later apologized for the incident, and was not disqualified from the results.

=== Red Bull–Bora–Hansgrohe (2025–) ===
In 2025, Van Gils signed with UCI WorldTeam Red Bull–Bora–Hansgrohe on a three-year deal. He took two victories in his first season with the team; winning a stage of the Vuelta a Andalucía and the Tour of Norway. The following year, he won stage six of the Tour Auvergne-Rhône-Alpes from the breakaway.

== Major results ==
2017
1st La Classique des Alpes Juniors
2019
1st Stage 2 Vuelta a Navarra
6th Overall Circuit des Ardennes
10th Eschborn–Frankfurt Under-23
2020
3rd Overall Tour de Savoie Mont-Blanc

1st Young rider classification

4th Overall Giro della Regione Friuli Venezia Giulia
2021
7th Overall Tour de Wallonie
2022 (2 pro wins)
1st Overall Saudi Tour

1st Young rider classification
1st Stage 4

5th Japan Cup
7th Overall Tour de Wallonie
2023
2nd Volta Limburg Classic
4th Japan Cup
5th Muscat Classic
6th Overall Tour of Oman
7th Amstel Gold Race
8th La Flèche Wallonne
10th Overall Tour de Luxembourg
2024 (3)
1st Eschborn–Frankfurt
1st Grand Prix of Aargau Canton
1st Stage 3 (ITT) Vuelta a Andalucía
2nd GP Miguel Induráin
3rd Strade Bianche
3rd La Flèche Wallonne
3rd La Drôme Classic
3rd Famenne Ardenne Classic
4th Liège–Bastogne–Liège
4th Grand Prix Cycliste de Montréal
5th Ardèche Classic
7th Milan–San Remo
2025 (2)
1st Stage 3 Tour of Norway
3rd Clásica de San Sebastián
4th Overall Vuelta a Andalucía

1st Points classification
1st Stage 1

2026 (1)
1st Stage 6 Tour Auvergne-Rhône-Alpes
1st (TTT) Trofeo Ses Salines
3rd Trofeo Andratx–Pollença
8th Road race, UEC European Road Championships
10th Overall Tour of Guangxi

=== Grand Tour general classification results timeline ===
Grand Tour	2021	2022	2023	2024	2025	2026
Giro d'Italia	—	—	—	—	—	—
Tour de France	—	—	59	DNF	—	27
Vuelta a España	88	DNF	—	—	—	

=== Classics results timeline ===
Monument	2021	2022	2023	2024	2025	2026
Milan–San Remo	—	34	38	7	19	—
Tour of Flanders	—	—	—	—	—	—
Paris–Roubaix	—	—	—	—	—	—
Liège–Bastogne–Liège	—	—	11	4	DNF	—
Giro di Lombardia	DNF	DNF	14	—	—	
Classic	2021	2022	2023	2024	2025	2026
Strade Bianche	—	53	23	3	—	—
Amstel Gold Race	—	23	7	20	DNF	—
La Flèche Wallonne	—	—	8	3	43	—
Eschborn–Frankfurt	73	48	—	1	—	—
Clásica de San Sebastián	12	DNF	—	18	3	
Grand Prix Cycliste de Québec	NH	—	52	53	—	
Grand Prix Cycliste de Montréal	NH	—	DNF	4	—	

Legend
—	Did not compete
DNF	Did not finish
