= 2024 Tour of Austria =

Austrian cycling race

2024 UCI Europe Tour

Race details
- Dates: 2-6 July 2024
- Stages: 4
- Distance: 642.1 km (399.0 mi)
- Winning time: 15h 43' 13"

Results
Jersey awarded to the overall winner	Winner	Diego Ulissi (ITA)	(UAE Team Emirates)
	Second	Brandon Rivera (COL)	(INEOS Grenadiers)
	Third	Magnus Sheffield (USA)	(INEOS Grenadiers)
Jersey awarded to the points classification winner	Points	Diego Ulissi (ITA)	(UAE Team Emirates)
Jersey awarded to the mountains classification winner	Mountains	Samuele Zoccarato (ITA)	(VF Group–Bardiani–CSF–Faizanè)
Jersey awarded to the young rider classification winner	Young rider	Magnus Sheffield (USA)	(INEOS Grenadiers)
	Team	UAE Team Emirates	

The 2024 Tour of Austria is a road cycling stage race that took place between 2 and 6 July 2024 in Austria. The race was rated as a category 2.1 event on the 2024 UCI Europe Tour calendar, and was the 73th edition of the Tour of Austria. Five stages were planned but the last stage was cancelled.

== Teams ==
4 of the 18 UCI WorldTeams, two UCI ProTeams, and fourteen UCI Continental teams, made up the 20 teams that participated in the race.

UCI WorldTeams

- Alpecin–Deceuninck
- INEOS Grenadiers
- Team Jayco–AlUla
- UAE Team Emirates

UCI ProTeams

- VF Group–Bardiani–CSF–Faizanè
- TDT–Unibet Cycling Team

UCI Continental Teams

- ATT Investments
- BEAT Cycling Club
- Team Coop–Repsol
- Elkov–Kasper
- Team Felt–Felbermayr
- Lidl–Trek Future Racing
- P&S Metalltechnik Benotti
- Santic–Wibatech
- Hrinkow Advarics
- Team Lotto–Kern Haus PSD Bank
- Team Vorarlberg
- Tirol KTM Cycling Team
- WSA KTM Graz
- Voster ATS Team

== Route ==
Stage characteristics and winners
Stage	Date	Course	Distance	Type	Stage winner
Prologue	2 July	St. Pölten to St. Pölten	3.05 km (1.90 mi)	Prologue	Cameron Rogers (AUS)
1	3 July	Bad Tatzmannsdorf to Bad Tatzmannsdorf	166.8 km (103.6 mi)	Hilly stage	Davide De Pretto (ITA)
2	4 July	Maria Taferl to Steyr	167.5 km (104.1 mi)	Hilly stage	Brandon Rivera (COL)
3	5 July	Schladming to St. Johann, Alpendorf	153.1 km (95.1 mi)	Hilly stage	Diego Ulissi (ITA)
4	6 July	St. Johann, Alpendorf to Kals	151.7 km (94.3 mi)	Mountain stage	Filippo Ganna (ITA)
Total			642.1 km (399.0 mi)		
