= 2024 Vuelta a Andalucía =

Spanish cycling race

2024 UCI ProSeries

Race details
- Dates: 16 February 2024
- Stages: 1 (Note: Stage 1,2,4 and 5 were cancelled due to lack of Guardia Civil officers due to farmers' demonstrations.)
- Distance: 4.95 km (3.076 mi)

Results
| | Winner | No winner |

The 2024 Vuelta a Andalucía Ruta del Sol (English: Tour of Andalucia Route of the Sun) was a road cycling stage race that was scheduled to take place between 14 and 18 February 2024 in the autonomous community of Andalusia in southern Spain. However, due to farmers protests in the region, the race was shortened to a single 5 kilometer time trial, as the race organizers could not guarantee the safety of the race. The race was rated as a category 2.Pro event on the 2024 UCI ProSeries calendar, and will be the 70th edition of the Vuelta a Andalucía.

== Teams ==
Seven of the 18 UCI WorldTeams and eight UCI ProTeams made up the 15 teams that participated in the race.

UCI WorldTeams

- Alpecin–Deceuninck
- Astana Qazaqstan Team
- Decathlon–AG2R La Mondiale
- Movistar Team
- Team Bahrain Victorious
- Team Jayco–AlUla
- UAE Team Emirates

UCI ProTeams

- Burgos BH
- Caja Rural–Seguros RGA
- Equipo Kern Pharma
- Euskaltel–Euskadi
- Lotto–Dstny
- Q36.5 Pro Cycling Team
- Team Flanders–Baloise
- Polti–Kometa

== Route ==
Stage characteristics and winners
| Stage | Date | Course | Distance | Type | Stage winner |
|---|---|---|---|---|---|
| 1 | 14 February | ~~Almuñécar to Cádiar~~ | ~~162.3 km (100.8 mi)~~ | Hilly stage | Stage cancelled |
| 2 | 15 February | ~~Vélez-Málaga to Alcaudete~~ | ~~192.2 km (119.4 mi)~~ | Mountain stage | Stage cancelled |
| 3 | 16 February | ~~Arjona~~ Alcaudete to ~~Pozoblanco~~ Alcaudete | ~~161 km (100 mi)~~ 4.95 km (3.08 mi) | Individual time trial | Maxim Van Gils (BEL) |
| 4 | 17 February | ~~Córdoba~~ ~~Lucena~~ to ~~Lucena~~ | ~~166.7 km (103.6 mi)~~ ~~100 km (62 mi)~~ | Mountain stage | Stage cancelled |
| 5 | 18 February | ~~Benahavís~~ to ~~La Línea de la Concepción~~ | ~~168 km (104 mi)~~ | Hilly stage | Stage cancelled |
| Total | | | 4.95 km (3.08 mi) | | |

== Stages ==
=== Stage 1 ===
14 February 2024 – Almuñécar to Cádiar, 162.3 km (100.8 mi)

Stage cancelled due to lack of Guardia Civil officers due to farmers' demonstrations.

=== Stage 2 ===
15 February 2024 – Vélez-Málaga to Alcaudete, 192.2 km (119.4 mi)

Stage cancelled due to lack of Guardia Civil officers due to farmers' demonstrations.

=== Stage 3 ===
16 February 2024 – Alcaudete to Alcaudete, 4.95 km (3.08 mi) (ITT)

Stage 3 Result (1–10)
| Rank | Rider | Team | Time |
|---|---|---|---|
| 1 | Maxim Van Gils (BEL) | Lotto–Dstny | 8' 17" |
| 2 | Juan Ayuso (ESP) | UAE Team Emirates | + 10" |
| 3 | Antonio Tiberi (ITA) | Team Bahrain Victorious | + 11" |
| 4 | Jefferson Alveiro Cepeda (ECU) | Caja Rural–Seguros RGA | + 14" |
| 5 | Tim Wellens (BEL) | UAE Team Emirates | + 14" |
| 6 | Sylvain Moniquet (BEL) | Lotto–Dstny | + 15" |
| 7 | Santiago Buitrago (COL) | Team Bahrain Victorious | + 16" |
| 8 | Alex Baudin (FRA) | Decathlon–AG2R La Mondiale | + 22" |
| 9 | Marc Soler (ESP) | UAE Team Emirates | + 23" |
| 10 | Gonzalo Serrano (ESP) | Movistar Team | + 24" |

General classification after Stage 3 (1–10)
| Rank | Rider | Team | Time |
|---|---|---|---|
| 1 | Maxim Van Gils (BEL) | Lotto–Dstny | 8' 17" |
| 2 | Juan Ayuso (ESP) | UAE Team Emirates | + 10" |
| 3 | Antonio Tiberi (ITA) | Team Bahrain Victorious | + 11" |
| 4 | Jefferson Alveiro Cepeda (ECU) | Caja Rural–Seguros RGA | + 14" |
| 5 | Tim Wellens (BEL) | UAE Team Emirates | + 14" |
| 6 | Sylvain Moniquet (BEL) | Lotto–Dstny | + 15" |
| 7 | Santiago Buitrago (COL) | Team Bahrain Victorious | + 16" |
| 8 | Alex Baudin (FRA) | Decathlon–AG2R La Mondiale | + 22" |
| 9 | Marc Soler (ESP) | UAE Team Emirates | + 23" |
| 10 | Gonzalo Serrano (ESP) | Movistar Team | + 24" |

=== Stage 4 ===
17 February 2024 – Lucena to Lucena, 100 km (62 mi)

Stage cancelled due to lack of Guardia Civil officers due to farmers' demonstrations.

=== Stage 5 ===
18 February 2024 – Benahavís to La Línea de la Concepción, 168 km (104 mi)

Stage cancelled due to lack of Guardia Civil officers due to farmers' demonstrations.

== Classification leadership table ==
Classification leadership by stage
| Stage | Winner | General classification | Points classification | Mountains classification | Sprints classification | Andalusian rider classification | Spanish rider classification | Combination classification | Team classification |
|---|---|---|---|---|---|---|---|---|---|
| 1 | Stage cancelled | | | | | | | | |
| 2 | Stage cancelled | | | | | | | | |
| 3 | Maxim Van Gils | Maxim Van Gils | Maxim Van Gils | Not awarded | Not awarded | Not awarded | Not awarded | Not awarded | UAE Team Emirates |
| 4 | Stage cancelled | | | | | | | | |
| 5 | Stage cancelled | | | | | | | | |
| Final | | Not awarded | Not awarded | Not awarded | Not awarded | Not awarded | Not awarded | Not awarded | Not awarded |
