= Giulio Ciccone =

Italian cyclist

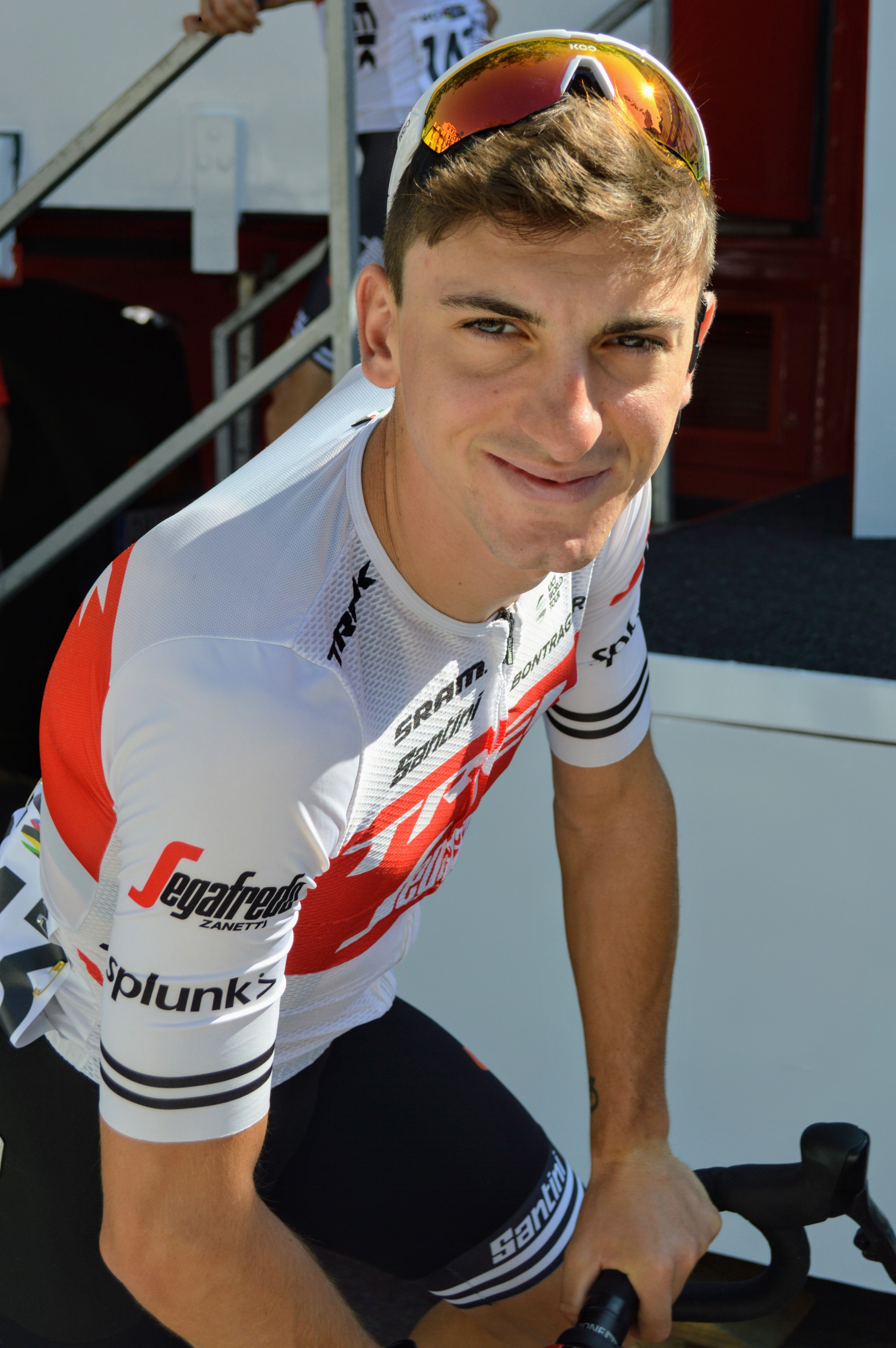
- Ciccone in 2019

Personal information
- Full name: Giulio Ciccone
- Born: 20 December 1994 (age 31) Chieti, Italy
- Height: 176 cm (5 ft 9 in)
- Weight: 58 kg (128 lb)

Cycling career
- Sport: Cycling
- Current team: Lidl–Trek
- Discipline: Road
- Role: Rider
- Rider type: Climber

Amateur teams
- 2013: Palazzago Fenice Maiet
- 2014–2015: Team Colpack

Professional teams
- 2016–2018: Bardiani–CSF
- 2019–: Trek–Segafredo

Major wins
- Grand Tours Tour de France Mountains classification (2023) Giro d'Italia Mountains classification (2019, 2026) 3 individual stages (2016, 2019, 2022) One-day races and Classics Clásica de San Sebastián (2025) Trofeo Laigueglia (2020)

Giulio Ciccone (born 20 December 1994) is an Italian cyclist, who currently rides for UCI WorldTeam Lidl–Trek. Ciccone's career highlights include several stage wins at the Giro d'Italia and the mountains classification at the 2023 Tour de France.

== Career ==
=== Bardiani–CSF (2016–18) ===
Ciccone was named in the start list for the 2016 Giro d'Italia, where he won stage 10. At the 2018 Giro d'Italia, Ciccone finished second in the mountains classification, behind overall race winner Chris Froome. Also in 2018, Ciccone won the Giro dell'Appennino and finished second in the inaugural Adriatica Ionica Race.

=== Trek–Segafredo (2019–present) ===
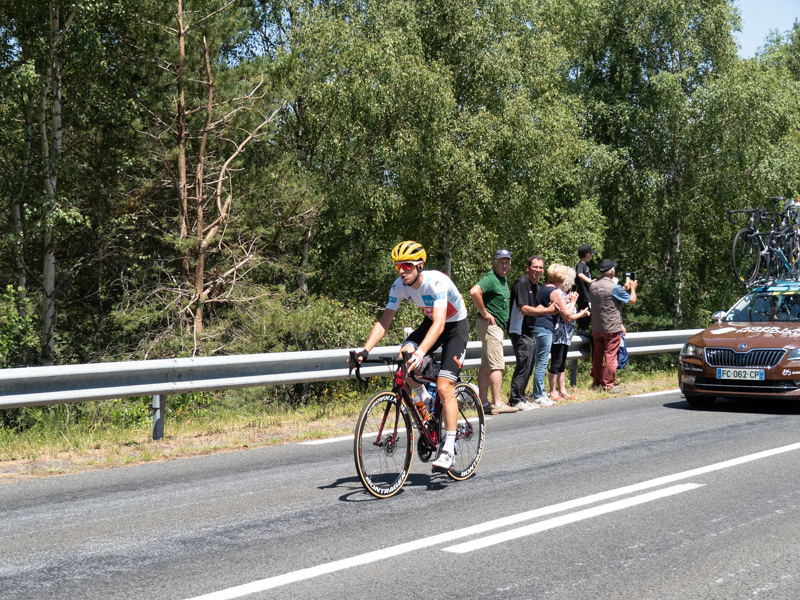
Ciccone at the 2019 Tour de France

After three years with Bardiani–CSF, Ciccone joined Trek–Segafredo on an initial two-year contract from the 2019 season. At the 2019 Giro d'Italia Ciccone won the mountains classification jersey, accumulating more than twice as many points as the runner-up Fausto Masnada. He finished 16th overall, with a victory on stage sixteen, a finish at Ponte di Legno. After this, Ciccone was named in the startlist for the Tour de France. During the sixth stage to La Planche des Belles Filles, he was part of a breakaway which survived to the finish line. Ciccone managed to take over the race leader's yellow jersey from Julian Alaphilippe despite fading in the final metres of the climb. He held the lead for two days, before Alaphilippe retook the jersey after gaining twenty seconds on the run-in to the finish in Saint-Étienne. Ciccone also held the lead of the young rider classification for four days, ultimately finishing just outside the top thirty placings overall and sixth in the young rider standings.

In summer 2019, Ciccone signed a 12-month extension to his contract, until the end of the 2021 season.

In 2020, his top result was winning the Trofeo Laigueglia.

He competed in the road race at the 2020 Summer Olympics.

Ciccone had his third Giro d'Italia stage win on stage 15 of the 2022 edition. He also earned the combativity award for the day.

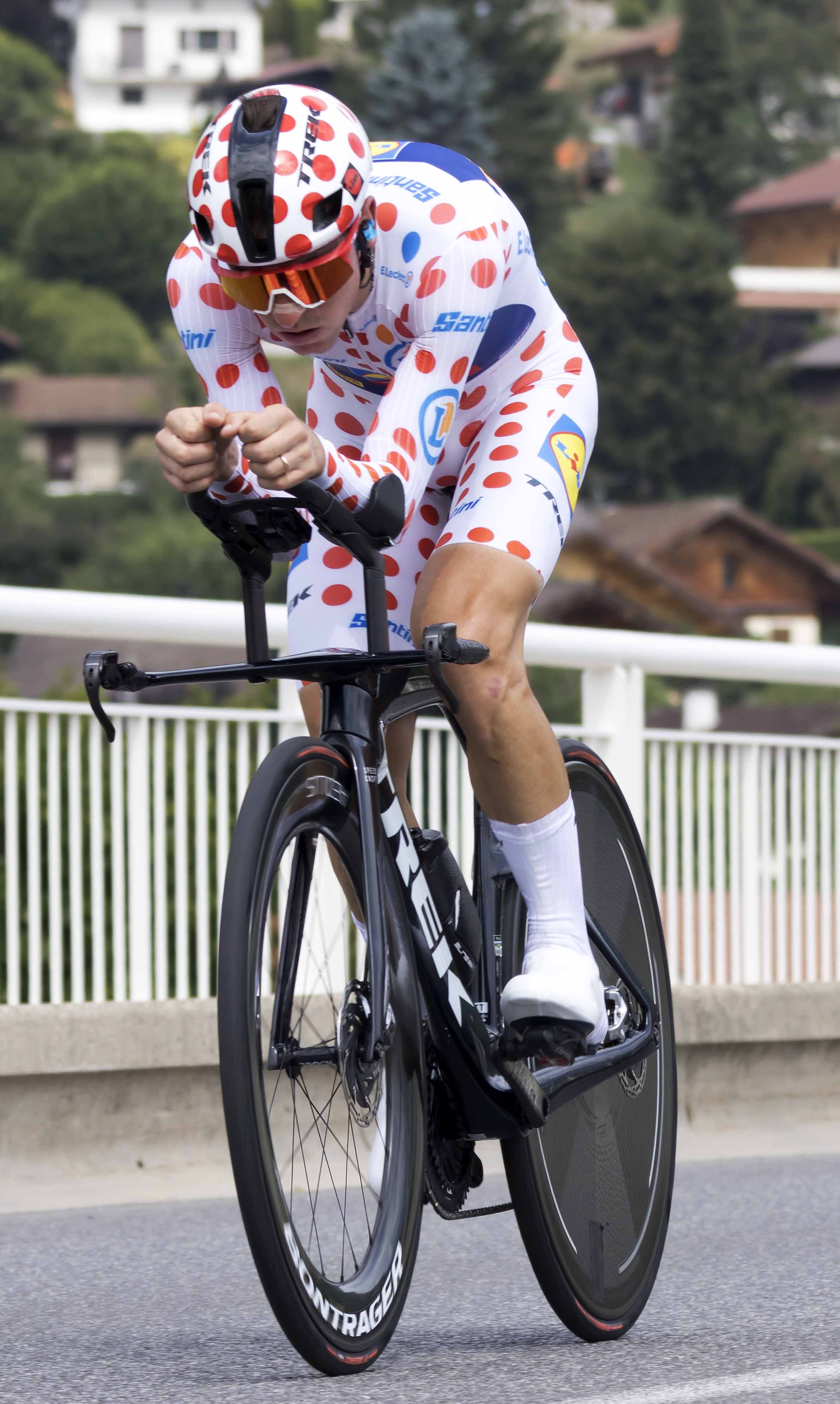
Ciccone racing in the polkadot jersey at the 2023 Tour de France

He won the mountains classification at the 2023 Tour de France with a 14-point lead over Felix Gall, in addition to a second place finish on stage 5. A month prior, he won the mountains classification and the eighth stage of the Critérium du Dauphiné.

In the 2026 edition of the Giro d'Italia, he wore the maglia rosa for the first time in his career after finishing 3rd on stage 4.

== Major results ==
2014
1st Trofeo Rigoberto Lamonica
5th GP Capodarco
6th Overall Giro della Valle d'Aosta

1st Mountains classification

9th Gran Premio di Poggiana
2015
1st Bassano-Monte Grappa
1st Mountains classification, Giro della Valle d'Aosta
1st Coppa Città di San Daniele
2nd Piccolo Giro di Lombardia
4th Coppa Collecchio
6th Overall Tour de l'Avenir
2016 (1 pro win)
1st Stage 10 Giro d'Italia
5th Gran Premio della Costa Etruschi
6th Overall Settimana Internazionale di Coppi e Bartali
2017 (1)
3rd Pro Ötztaler 5500
6th Overall Tour of Utah

1st Stage 6

6th Overall Tour of Austria
2018 (1)
1st Giro dell'Appennino
1st Mountains classification, Okolo Slovenska
2nd Overall Adriatica Ionica Race
7th Gran Premio di Lugano
9th Overall Tour of the Alps
10th Overall Settimana Internazionale di Coppi e Bartali
2019 (2)
Giro d'Italia

1st Mountains classification
1st Stage 16

6th Trofeo Laigueglia
7th Coppa Agostoni
8th Overall Tour du Haut Var

1st Stage 2

10th Trofeo Serra de Tramuntana
Tour de France

Held after Stages 6–7
Held after Stages 6–9

2020 (1)
1st Trofeo Laigueglia
5th Giro di Lombardia
8th Giro dell'Emilia
9th Gran Piemonte
2021
5th Overall Route d'Occitanie
5th Trofeo Laigueglia
6th Circuito de Getxo
2022 (1)
Giro d'Italia

1st Stage 15
Combativity award Stage 15

7th Japan Cup
8th Overall Volta a la Comunitat Valenciana
8th Trofeo Laigueglia
10th Overall Tirreno–Adriatico
2023 (3)
Critérium du Dauphiné

1st Mountains classification
1st Stage 8

Tour de France

1st Mountains classification
Combativity award Stage 14

2nd Overall Volta a la Comunitat Valenciana

1st Points classification
1st Stage 2

5th Overall Tirreno–Adriatico
5th La Flèche Wallonne
7th Overall Volta a Catalunya

1st Stage 2

8th Giro dell'Emilia
2024
3rd Giro di Lombardia
8th Overall Critérium du Dauphiné
2025 (3)
1st Clásica de San Sebastián
2nd Overall UAE Tour
2nd Liège–Bastogne–Liège
4th Overall Tour of the Alps

1st Stage 1

5th Overall Vuelta a Burgos

1st Points classification
1st Stage 5

6th Road race, UCI Road World Championships
2026
Giro d'Italia

1st Mountains classification
Held after Stage 4

1st Mountains classification, Volta a Catalunya
2nd Road race, UEC European Road Championships
2nd Grand Prix Cycliste de Québec
3rd Overall Vuelta a Burgos
3rd Giro di Lombardia
6th Overall Tirreno–Adriatico
6th Clásica de San Sebastián
6th Circuito de Getxo
7th Grand Prix Cycliste de Montréal
9th Road race, UCI Road World Championships
3rd Giro di Lombardia

=== General classification results timeline ===
Grand Tour general classification results
Grand Tour	2016	2017	2018	2019	2020	2021	2022	2023	2024	2025	2026
Giro d'Italia	DNF	95	40	16	DNF	DNF	25	—	—	DNF	20
Tour de France	—	—	—	31	—	—	59	32	11	—	—
Vuelta a España	—	—	—	—	—	DNF	—	—	DNF	18	—
Major stage race general classification results
Race	2016	2017	2018	2019	2020	2021	2022	2023	2024	2025	2026
Paris–Nice	—	—	—	37	—	—	—	—	—	—	—
Tirreno–Adriatico	—	—	—	—	—	26	10	5	—	13	6
Volta a Catalunya	—	—	—	29	NH	DNF	21	7	—	—	33
Tour of the Basque Country	Has not contested during his career										
Tour de Romandie	—	—	—	—	—	—	—	—	34	—	—
Critérium du Dauphiné	—	—	—	—	—	—	—	11	8	—	—
Tour de Suisse	Has not contested during his career										

=== Classics results timeline ===
Monument	2017	2018	2019	2020	2021	2022	2023	2024	2025	2026
Milan–San Remo	—	66	—	29	—	—	—	—	47	38
Tour of Flanders	Has not contested during his career									
Paris–Roubaix	Has not contested during his career									
Liège–Bastogne–Liège	—	—	34	—	—	—	13	—	2	20
Giro di Lombardia	49	41	22	5	—	15	—	3	—	3
Classic	2017	2018	2019	2020	2021	2022	2023	2024	2025	2026
La Flèche Wallonne	—	—	25	—	—	—	5	—	—	—
Clásica de San Sebastián	—	—	11	NH	14	—	—	35	1	6
Grand Prix Cycliste de Québec	—	—	—	NH	NH	—	—	—	—	2
Grand Prix Cycliste de Montréal	—	—	—	NH	NH	—	—	—	—	7
Giro dell'Emilia	34	16	12	8	—	DNF	8	43	—	
Gran Piemonte	—	—	—	9	—	100	—	30	—	

Legend
—	Did not compete
DNF	Did not finish
IP	In Progress
