= 2024 Bretagne Classic Ouest-France =

One-day cycling race in France

2024 UCI World Tour, race 29 of 35

Race details
- Dates: 25 August 2024
- Stages: 1
- Distance: 259.8 km (161.4 mi)
- Winning time: 6h 09' 35"

Results
	Winner	Marc Hirschi (SUI)	(UAE Team Emirates)
	Second	Paul Magnier (FRA)	(Soudal–Quick-Step)
	Third	Magnus Cort (DEN)	(Uno-X Mobility)

The 2024 Bretagne Classic Ouest–France was a road cycling one-day race that took place on 25 August in the region of Brittany in northwestern France. It was the 88th edition of the Bretagne Classic Ouest-France and the 29th event of the 2024 UCI World Tour.

== Teams ==
All eighteen UCI WorldTeams and six UCI ProTeams made up the twenty-four teams that participated in the race.

UCI WorldTeams

- Alpecin–Deceuninck
- Arkéa–B&B Hotels
- Astana Qazaqstan Team
- Cofidis
- Decathlon–AG2R La Mondiale
- EF Education–EasyPost
- Groupama–FDJ
- Ineos Grenadiers
- Intermarché–Wanty
- Lidl–Trek
- Movistar Team
- Red Bull–Bora–Hansgrohe
- Soudal–Quick-Step
- Team Bahrain Victorious
- Team dsm–firmenich PostNL
- Team Jayco–AlUla
- UAE Team Emirates
- Visma–Lease a Bike

UCI ProTeams

- Burgos BH
- Euskaltel–Euskadi
- Israel–Premier Tech
- Lotto–Dstny
- Team TotalEnergies
- Uno-X Mobility

== Result ==
Result
Rank	Rider	Team	Time
1	Marc Hirschi (SUI)	UAE Team Emirates	6h 09' 35"
2	Paul Magnier (FRA)	Soudal–Quick-Step	+ 1"
3	Magnus Cort (DEN)	Uno-X Mobility	+ 1"
4	Arnaud De Lie (BEL)	Lotto–Dstny	+ 1"
5	Thibau Nys (BEL)	Lidl–Trek	+ 1"
6	Dorian Godon (FRA)	Decathlon–AG2R La Mondiale	+ 1"
7	Michael Matthews (AUS)	Team Jayco–AlUla	+ 1"
8	Thibaud Gruel (FRA)	Groupama–FDJ	+ 1"
9	Clément Venturini (FRA)	Arkéa–B&B Hotels	+ 1"
10	Hugo Page (FRA)	Intermarché–Wanty	+ 1"
