= 2025 Clásica de San Sebastián =

2025 UCI World Tour, race 27 of 36

Race details
- Dates: 2 August 2025
- Stages: 1
- Distance: 211.4 km (131.4 mi)
- Winning time: 5h 05' 33"

Results
| | Winner | Giulio Ciccone (ITA) | (Lidl–Trek) |
| | Second | Jan Christen (SUI) | (UAE Team Emirates XRG) |
| | Third | Maxim Van Gils (BEL) | (Red Bull–Bora–Hansgrohe) |

The 2025 Clásica de San Sebastián was a one-day road cycling race that took place on August 2, 2025, in San Sebastián, Spain. It was the 44th official edition of the Clásica de San Sebastián and the 27th event of the 2025 UCI World Tour.

== Teams ==
Twenty-four teams, comprising eighteen UCI WorldTeams and six UCI Professional Continental Teams, five of which are invited, participated in the race.

UCI WorldTeams

- Alpecin–Deceuninck
- Arkéa–B&B Hotels
- Cofidis
- Decathlon–AG2R La Mondiale
- EF Education–EasyPost
- Groupama–FDJ
- Ineos Grenadiers
- Intermarché–Wanty
- Lidl–Trek
- Movistar Team
- Red Bull–Bora–Hansgrohe
- Soudal–Quick-Step
- Team Bahrain Victorious
- Team Picnic–PostNL
- Team Jayco–AlUla
- UAE Team Emirates XRG
- Visma–Lease a Bike

UCI Professional Continental Teams

- Caja Rural–Seguros RGA
- Equipo Kern Pharma
- Euskaltel–Euskadi
- Israel–Premier Tech
- Lotto
- Team TotalEnergies
- Uno-X Mobility

== Result ==
Result
| Rank | Rider | Team | Time |
|---|---|---|---|
| 1 | Giulio Ciccone (ITA) | Lidl–Trek | 5h 05' 33" |
| 2 | Jan Christen (SUI) | UAE Team Emirates XRG | + 9" |
| 3 | Maxim Van Gils (BEL) | Red Bull–Bora–Hansgrohe | + 19" |
| 4 | Tiesj Benoot (BEL) | Visma–Lease a Bike | + 19" |
| 5 | Isaac del Toro (MEX) | UAE Team Emirates XRG | + 19" |
| 6 | Neilson Powless (USA) | EF Education–EasyPost | + 19" |
| 7 | Luke Plapp (AUS) | Team Jayco–AlUla | + 21" |
| 8 | Christian Scaroni (ITA) | XDS Astana Team | + 1' 09" |
| 9 | Cian Uijtdebroeks (BEL) | Visma–Lease a Bike | + 1' 10" |
| 10 | Xandro Meurisse (BEL) | Alpecin–Deceuninck | + 2' 01" |
