= Cádiar =

Cádiar, Spain
- Coat of arms

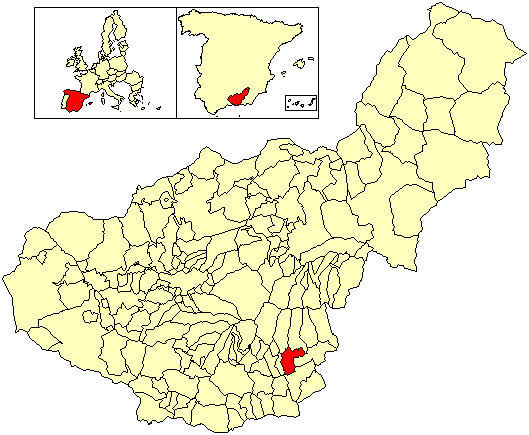
- Location of Cádiar
- Coordinates: 36°56′N 3°10′W
- Country: Spain
- Province: Granada
- Municipality: Cádiar

Area
  - Total: 47 km^{2} (18 sq mi)
- Elevation: 919 m (3,015 ft)

Population (2025-01-01)
  - Total: 1,491
  - Density: 32/km^{2} (82/sq mi)
- Time zone: UTC+1 (CET)
  - Summer (DST): UTC+2 (CEST)

Cádiar is a town located in the province of Granada, Spain. According to the 2005 census (INE), the city has a population of 1601 inhabitants. It borders the municipalities of Lobras, Bérchules, Alpujarra de la Sierra, Ugíjar, Murtas and Albondón. Other nearby towns are Tímar, Golco and Alcútar.

== History ==
Cádiar is a region which, by its geographical isolation, has always developed its own distinct culture that had its heyday in the Grenadines period, when Las Alpujarras was an important agricultural emporium specializing in the production of silk.

Cádiar has historically been a place of confluence of different cultures which swept across Las Alpujarras. The first records we have date from the twelfth century, when the famous Granada geographer al-Idrisi noted the existence of a castle in Cádiar, which was formerly called the "Hisn al-Qadir" ("Castle of the judge"). In the Muslim era, it possessed a mosque, several cemeteries or rabitas and at least three neighborhoods by their respective walls. In the Moorish period belonged to the extensive tahá Juviles along with sixteen other villages.

After the reconquest of Granada in 1492 by the Catholic Monarchs, the population was under intolerable pressure, and in 1568 a wealthy landowner in the area called Fernando de Córdoba y Valor (Aben Humeya) took up arms against King Philip II. The revolt began in Cádiar on Christmas Eve when a detachment of soldiers billeted in Cádiar were quietly murdered in their beds.

== See also ==
- List of municipalities in Granada
