= Davide De Pretto =

Italian cyclist

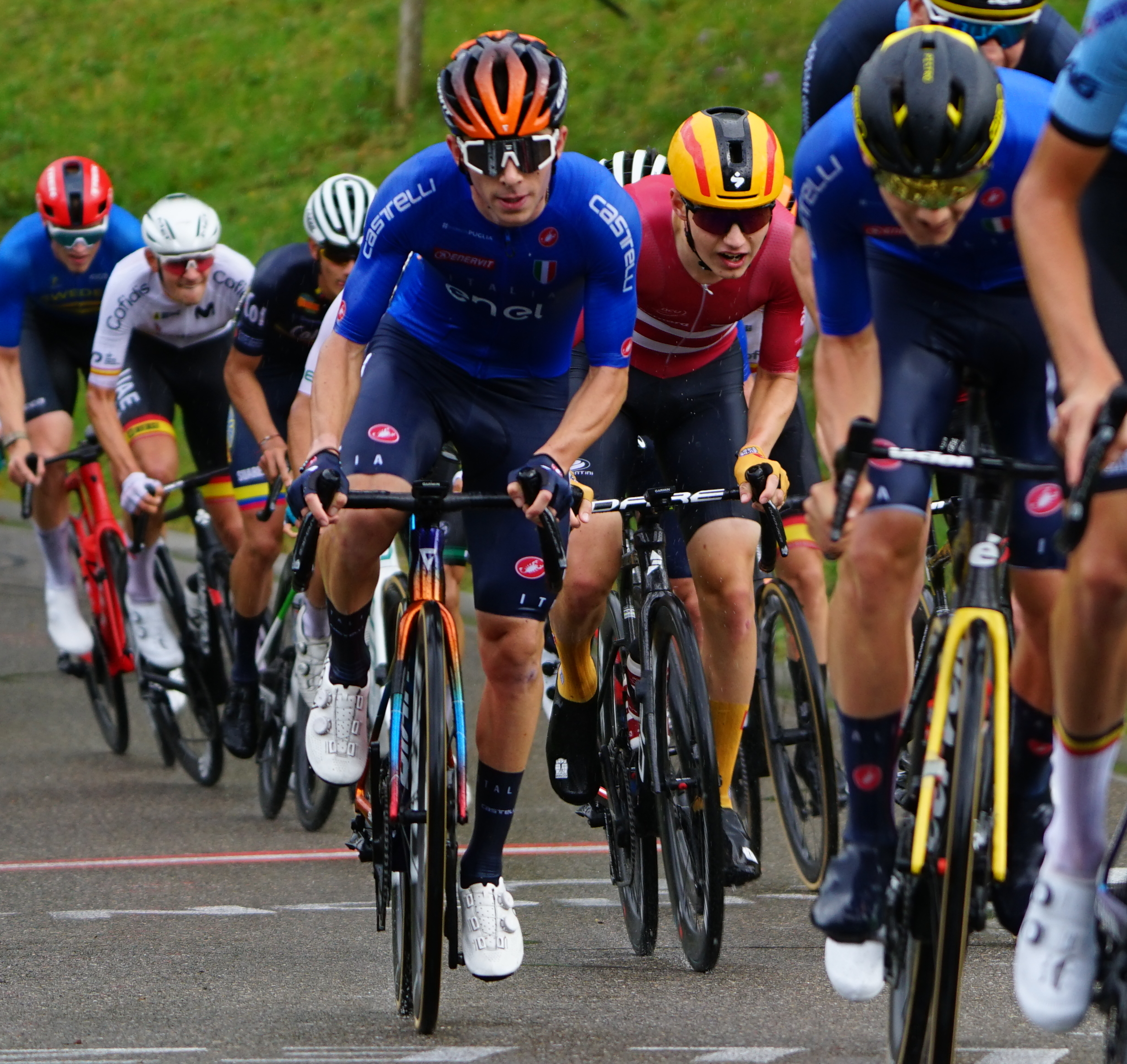
- De Pretto during the UCI U23 World Championships in Zurich

Personal information
- Born: 19 April 2002 (age 24) Thiene, Italy
- Weight: 58 kg (128 lb)

Cycling career
- Sport: Cycling
- Current team: Team Jayco–AlUla
- Discipline: Road
- Role: Rider

Professional teams
- 2021: Beltrami TSA–Tre Colli
- 2022–2023: Zalf Euromobil Fior
- 2022: Team BikeExchange–Jayco (stagiaire)
- 2024–: Team Jayco–AlUla
Medal record
Representing Italy
Men's road bicycle racing
European Championships
Bronze medal – third place	2022 Anadia	Under-23 road race

Davide De Pretto (born 19 April 2002) is an Italian cyclist, who currently rides for UCI WorldTeam Team Jayco–AlUla.

== Major results ==
2019
2nd Gran Premio dell'Arno
3rd La Piccola Sanremo
6th Trofeo Guido Dorigo
10th Ronde van Vlaanderen Junioren
2022
2nd GP Capodarco
2nd Giro del Medio Brenta
3rd Road race, UEC European Under-23 Road Championships
4th Giro del Belvedere
6th Trofeo Piva
8th Gran Premio della Liberazione
2023
1st Trofeo Alcide Degasperi
1st Gran Premio General Store
1st Points classification, Giro Next Gen
2nd Giro del Belvedere
3rd Liège–Bastogne–Liège Espoirs
3rd Trofeo Piva
6th Giro del Medio Brenta
7th Overall Kreiz Breizh Elites
7th Trofeo Città di Brescia
8th Coppa della Pace
9th Road race, UEC European Under-23 Road Championships
2024 (1 pro win)
1st Stage 1 Tour of Austria
4th Overall Settimana Internazionale di Coppi e Bartali
4th Giro del Veneto
4th Trofeo Matteotti
8th Coppa Agostoni
8th Memorial Marco Pantani
10th Muscat Classic
10th Veneto Classic
2025
5th Veneto Classic
