= 2024 Coppa Sabatini =

- 2024 UCI ProSeries

Race details
- Dates: 12 September 2024
- Stages: 1
- Distance: 197.6 km (122.8 mi)
- Winning time: 4h 53' 00"

Results
	Winner	Marc Hirschi (SUI)	(UAE Team Emirates)
	Second	Gregor Mühlberger (AUT)	(Movistar Team)
	Third	Anders Foldager (DEN)	(Team Jayco–AlUla)

The 2024 Coppa Sabatini (also known as the Gran Premio città di Peccioli) was the 72nd edition of the Coppa Sabatini road cycling one day race, which was held on 12 September 2024 as part of the 2024 UCI ProSeries calendar.

== Teams ==
Eight of the 18 UCI WorldTeams, eleven UCI ProTeams, and four UCI Continental teams made up the twenty-three teams that participated in the race.

UCI WorldTeams

- Astana Qazaqstan Team
- Arkéa–B&B Hotels
- Cofidis
- EF Education–EasyPost
- Movistar Team
- Red Bull–Bora–Hansgrohe
- Team Jayco–AlUla
- UAE Team Emirates

UCI ProTeams

- Bingoal WB
- Burgos BH
- Caja Rural–Seguros RGA
- Equipo Kern Pharma
- Q36.5 Pro Cycling Team
- TDT–Unibet Cycling Team
- Team Corratec–Vini Fantini
- Polti–Kometa
- Team TotalEnergies
- Tudor Pro Cycling Team
- VF Group–Bardiani–CSF–Faizanè

UCI Continental Teams

- MG.K vis Colors for Peace
- Petrolike
- Team Technipes #inEmiliaRomagna
- Work Service–Vitalcare–Dynatek

== Result ==
Result
Rank	Rider	Team	Time
1	Marc Hirschi (SUI)	UAE Team Emirates	4h 53' 00"
2	Gregor Mühlberger (AUT)	Movistar Team	+ 28"
3	Anders Foldager (DEN)	Team Jayco–AlUla	+ 28"
4	Kristian Sbaragli (ITA)	Team Corratec–Vini Fantini	+ 28"
5	Axel Huens (FRA)	TDT–Unibet Cycling Team	+ 33"
6	Georg Steinhauser (GER)	EF Education–EasyPost	+ 58"
7	Michael Storer (AUS)	Tudor Pro Cycling Team	+ 1' 05"
8	Orluis Aular (VEN)	Caja Rural–Seguros RGA	+ 1' 05"
9	Vincenzo Albanese (ITA)	Arkéa–B&B Hotels	+ 1' 12"
10	Alexander Hajek (AUT)	Red Bull–Bora–Hansgrohe	+ 1' 12"
