= Veneto Classic =

Annual one-day cycling race in Veneto, Italy

Race details
- Date: October
- Region: Veneto
- Discipline: Road
- Competition: UCI ProSeries
- Type: One-day race
- Web site: www.venetoclassic.com/it/

History
- First edition: 2021
- Editions: 6 (as of 2026)
- First winner: Samuele Battistella (ITA)
- Most wins: No repeat winners
- Most recent: Brandon McNulty (USA)

The Veneto Classic is a one-day road cycling race held annually since 2021 in Veneto, Italy. Since 2023, it has been on the UCI ProSeries calendar, having previously been on the UCI Europe Tour calendar as a 1.1 rated event.

== Winners ==
Year	Country	Rider	Team
2021	Italy	Samuele Battistella	Astana–Premier Tech
2022	Switzerland	Marc Hirschi	UAE Team Emirates
2023	Italy	Davide Formolo	UAE Team Emirates
2024	Denmark	Magnus Cort	Uno-X Mobility
2025	Norway	Sakarias Koller Løland	Uno-X Mobility
2026	United States	Brandon McNulty	UAE Team Emirates XRG
