= 2024 Eschborn–Frankfurt =

One-day cycling race in Germany

2024 UCI World Tour, race 21 of 35

Race details
- Dates: 1 May 2024
- Stages: 1
- Distance: 203.8 km (126.6 mi)
- Winning time: 4h 46' 48"

Results
	Winner	Maxim Van Gils (BEL)	(Lotto–Dstny)
	Second	Alex Aranburu (ESP)	(Movistar Team)
	Third	Riley Sheehan (USA)	(Israel–Premier Tech)

The 2024 Eschborn–Frankfurt was a road cycling one-day race that took place on 1 May in the Frankfurt Rhein-Main metro area in southwest Germany. It was the 61st edition of Eschborn–Frankfurt and the 21st event of the 2024 UCI World Tour. It was won by Maxim Van Gils in a bunch sprint.

== Teams ==
14 of the 18 UCI WorldTeams and five UCI ProTeams made up the nineteen teams that participated in the race. All teams entered a full squad of seven riders. In total, 133 riders started the race, of which 96 finished.

UCI WorldTeams

- Alpecin–Deceuninck
- Arkéa–B&B Hotels
- Bora–Hansgrohe
- Cofidis
- Decathlon–AG2R La Mondiale
- EF Education–EasyPost
- Intermarché–Wanty
- Lidl–Trek
- Movistar Team
- Soudal–Quick-Step
- Team Bahrain Victorious
- Team dsm–firmenich PostNL
- Team Jayco–AlUla
- UAE Team Emirates

UCI ProTeams

- Israel–Premier Tech
- Lotto–Dstny
- Q36.5 Pro Cycling Team
- Tudor Pro Cycling Team
- Uno-X Mobility

== Result ==
Result
Rank	Rider	Team	Time
1	Maxim Van Gils (BEL)	Lotto–Dstny	4h 46' 48"
2	Alex Aranburu (ESP)	Movistar Team	+ 0"
3	Riley Sheehan (USA)	Israel–Premier Tech	+ 0"
4	Lukas Nerurkar (GBR)	EF Education–EasyPost	+ 0"
5	Roger Adrià (ESP)	Bora–Hansgrohe	+ 0"
6	Kobe Goossens (BEL)	Intermarché–Wanty	+ 0"
7	Kevin Vermaerke (USA)	Team dsm–firmenich PostNL	+ 0"
8	Søren Kragh Andersen (DEN)	Alpecin–Deceuninck	+ 0"
9	Marc Hirschi (SUI)	UAE Team Emirates	+ 0"
10	Markus Hoelgaard (NOR)	Uno-X Mobility	+ 0"
