= Jenno Berckmoes =

Belgian cyclist

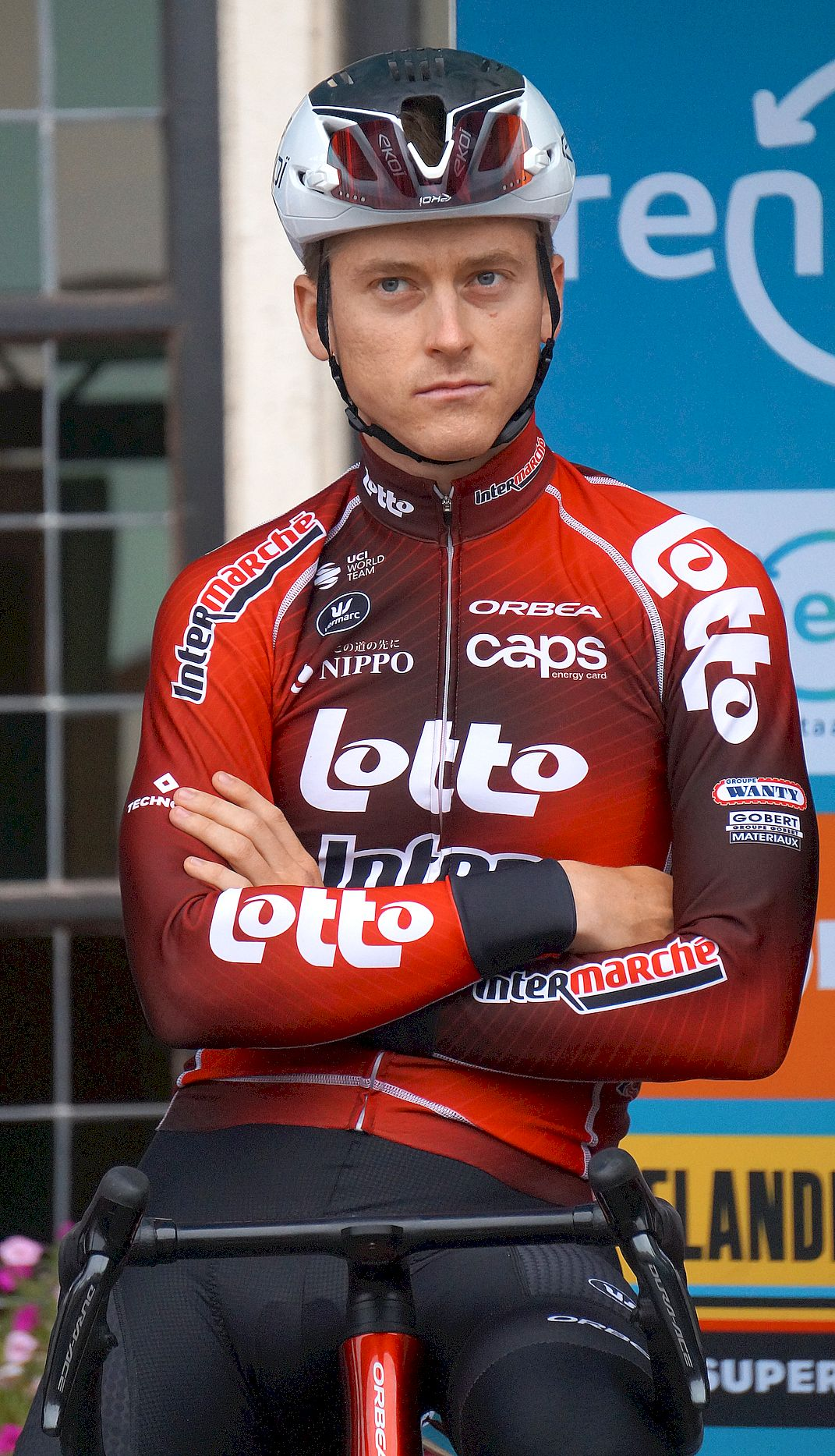

Personal information
- Born: 4 February 2001 (age 25) Ghent, Belgium
- Height: 1.77 m (5 ft 10 in)
- Weight: 61 kg (134 lb)

Cycling career
- Sport: Cycling
- Current team: Lotto–Intermarché
- Discipline: Road
- Role: Rider

Amateur teams
- 2014–2019: Onder Ons Parike
- 2020–2021: Home Solution–Soenens

Professional teams
- 2022–2023: Sport Vlaanderen–Baloise
- 2024–: Lotto–Intermarché
Medal record
Men's gravel bicycle racing
Representing Belgium
European Championships
Bronze medal – third place	2024 Asiago	Elite

Jenno Berckmoes (born 4 February 2001) is a Belgian racing cyclist, who currently rides for UCI WorldTeam Lotto–Intermarché.

== Major results ==
=== Road ===
2019
8th Johan Museeuw Classic
2021
1st Overall Tour de Namur

1st Stages 3 & 4 (ITT)

2022
10th Road race, UCI Road World Under-23 Championships
2023
4th Grand Prix La Marseillaise
2024 (2 pro wins)
1st Muur Classic Geraardsbergen
3rd Overall Four Days of Dunkirk
4th Circuit Franco-Belge
4th Druivenkoers Overijse
5th Overall Settimana Internazionale di Coppi e Bartali

1st Points classification
1st Stage 5

5th Overall Danmark Rundt
5th Overall Okolo Slovenska
7th Overall Arctic Race of Norway
7th Grand Prix La Marseillaise
8th Overall Étoile de Bessèges
2025 (1)
3rd Overall Tour of Belgium

1st Stage 4

3rd Muur Classic Geraardsbergen
4th Binche–Chimay–Binche
8th Gent–Wevelgem
2026 (1)
2nd Overall Renewi Tour

1st Stage 3

2nd Overall Tour of Belgium
2nd Binche–Chimay–Binche
3rd Japan Cup
3rd Muur Classic Geraardsbergen
4th Flandrien 0.0 Classic
5th Bretagne Classic
5th Circuit Franco-Belge
6th Grand Prix de Wallonie

==== Grand Tour general classification results timeline ====
Grand Tour	2025
Giro d'Italia	—
Tour de France	66
Vuelta a España	—

Legend
—	Did not compete
DNF	Did not finish

=== Gravel ===
2024
3rd UEC European Championships
2025
4th Serenissima Gravel
