= 2024 GP Industria & Artigianato di Larciano =

- 2024 UCI ProSeries

Race details
- Dates: 8 September 2024
- Stages: 1
- Distance: 168.8 km (104.9 mi)
- Winning time: 3h 53' 35"

Results
	Winner	Marc Hirschi (SUI)	(UAE Team Emirates)
	Second	Guillermo Thomas Silva (URU)	(Caja Rural–Seguros RGA)
	Third	Diego Ulissi (ITA)	(UAE Team Emirates)

The 2024 GP Industria & Artigianato di Larciano (transl. GP Industry & Handicraft of Larciano) was the 55th edition of the GP Industria & Artigianato di Larciano road cycling one-day race that was held on 8 September 2024. It was held as a 1.Pro event on the 2024 UCI ProSeries calendar.

== Teams ==
Three UCI WorldTeams, nine UCI ProTeams, five UCI Continental teams and the Italian national team made up the eighteen teams that participated in the race.

UCI WorldTeams

- EF Education–EasyPost
- Movistar Team
- UAE Team Emirates

UCI ProTeams

- Bingoal WB
- Caja Rural–Seguros RGA
- Polti–Kometa
- Q36.5 Pro Cycling Team
- TDT–Unibet Cycling Team
- Team Corratec–Vini Fantini
- Team Novo Nordisk
- Team TotalEnergies
- VF Group–Bardiani–CSF–Faizanè

UCI Continental Teams

- JCL Team Ukyo
- MG.K vis Colors for Peace
- Petrolike
- Team Technipes #inEmiliaRomagna
- Work Service–Vitalcare–Dynatek

National Teams

- Italy

== Result ==
Result
Rank	Rider	Team	Time
1	Marc Hirschi (SUI)	UAE Team Emirates	3h 53' 35"
2	Guillermo Thomas Silva (URU)	Caja Rural–Seguros RGA	+ 5"
3	Diego Ulissi (ITA)	UAE Team Emirates	+ 10"
4	Javier Romo (ESP)	Movistar Team	+ 10"
5	Simone Velasco (ITA)	Italy	+ 10"
6	Vincenzo Albanese (ITA)	Italy	+ 10"
7	Mattéo Vercher (FRA)	Team TotalEnergies	+ 10"
8	Joel Nicolau (ESP)	Caja Rural–Seguros RGA	+ 10"
9	Gianluca Brambilla (ITA)	Q36.5 Pro Cycling Team	+ 10"
10	Giovanni Carboni (ITA)	JCL Team Ukyo	+ 10"
