= Archie Ryan (cyclist) =

Irish cyclist

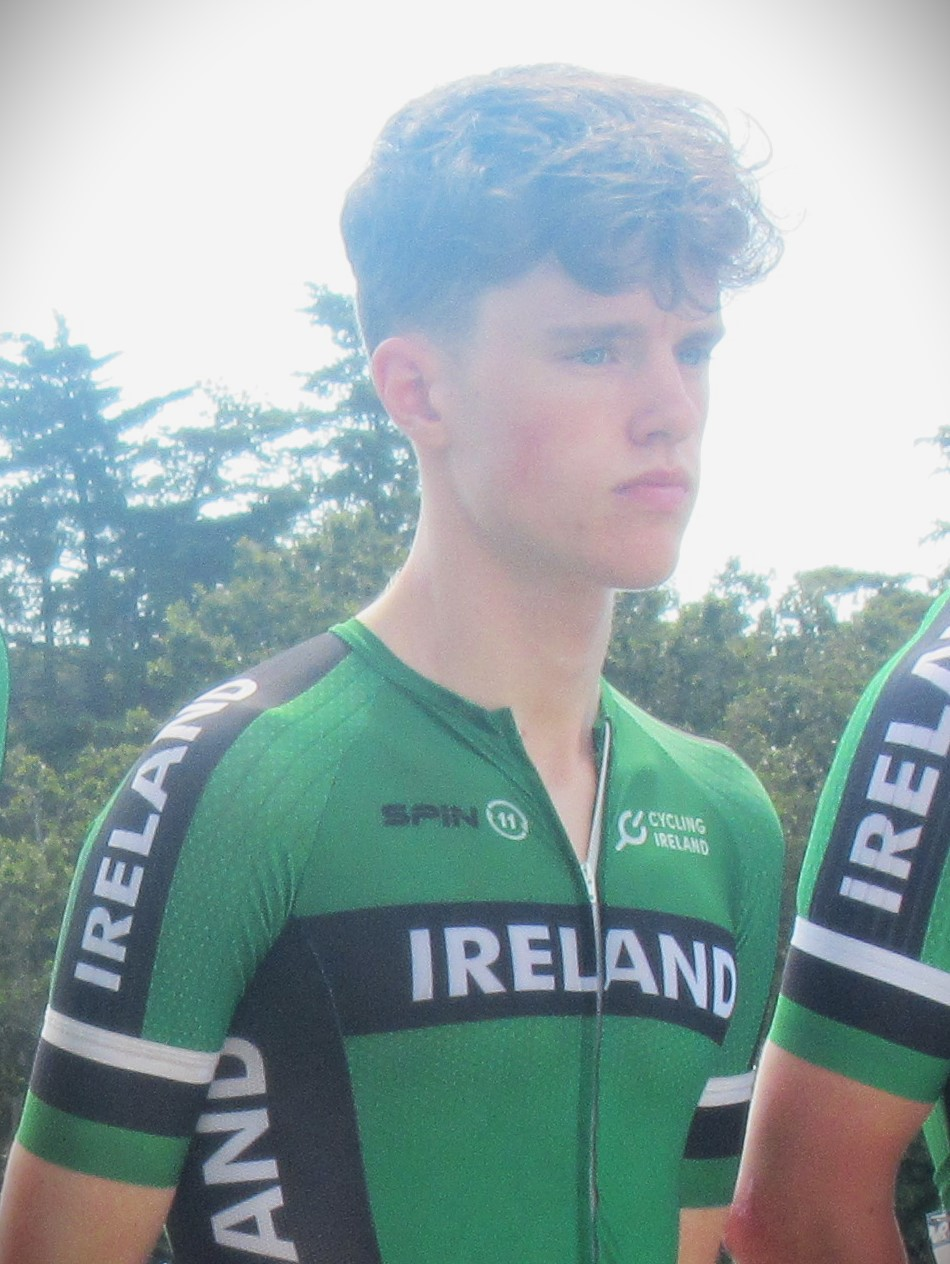
- Ryan in 2023

Personal information
- Born: 16 November 2001 (age 24) Wicklow, Ireland
- Height: 1.73 m (5 ft 8 in)

Cycling career
- Sport: Cycling
- Current team: EF Education–EasyPost
- Discipline: Road
- Role: Rider

Professional teams
- 2020–2023: Jumbo–Visma Development Team
- 2024–: EF Education–EasyPost

Archie Ryan (born 16 November 2001) is an Irish professional racing cyclist, who currently rides for UCI WorldTeam EF Education–EasyPost.

In early 2026, Ryan underwent surgery to remove plica in both knees. He hopes to return to racing in August, saying "The team are being great. They're just trying to put no pressure on me, so I don't fix my eyes on a date and do too much to be ready, you know? So as soon as I get some solid weeks of proper training underneath me and I'm ready to race [...] It is what's getting me out of bed in the morning. [...] I just want to put a number on and get stuck in."

== Major results ==
2018
3rd Overall Junior Tour of Wales

1st Stage 4

2019
National Junior Road Championships

2nd Road race
2nd Time trial

6th Overall Bizkaiko Itzuli
2020
7th Overall Bałtyk–Karkonosze Tour
8th Overall Ronde de l'Isard
2022 (1 pro win)
4th Overall Tour de l'Avenir
6th Overall Okolo Slovenska

1st Young rider classification
1st Stage 2

6th Overall Sazka Tour
7th Overall Istrian Spring Trophy
7th G.P. Palio del Recioto
8th Overall Ronde de l'Isard

1st Stage 5

2023
1st Stage 7b Tour de l'Avenir
1st Coppa Città di San Daniele
2nd Piccolo Giro di Lombardia
4th Gran Premio di Poggiana
2024 (1)
2nd Overall Settimana Internazionale di Coppi e Bartali

1st Young rider classification
1st Stage 4

5th Overall Deutschland Tour
5th GP Miguel Induráin
9th Overall Tour de l'Ain
9th Giro dell'Emilia
2025
2nd Overall Tour of Austria
8th Andorra MoraBanc Clàssica
