= 2024 Settimana Internazionale di Coppi e Bartali =

Italian cycling race

2024 UCI Europe Tour

Race details
- Dates: 19–23 March 2024
- Stages: 5
- Distance: 707 km (439.3 mi)
- Winning time: 17h 35' 44"

Results
Jersey awarded to the overall winner	Winner	Koen Bouwman (NED)	(Visma–Lease a Bike)
	Second	Archie Ryan (IRL)	(EF Education–EasyPost)
	Third	Diego Ulissi (ITA)	(UAE Team Emirates)
Jersey awarded to the points classification winner	Points	Jenno Berckmoes (BEL)	(Lotto–Dstny)
Jersey awarded to the mountains classification winner	Mountains	Manuele Tarozzi (ITA)	(VF Group–Bardiani–CSF–Faizanè)
Jersey awarded to the youth classification winner	Youth	Archie Ryan (IRL)	(EF Education–EasyPost)
	Team	(Belgium) Lotto–Dstny	

The 2024 Settimana Internazionale di Coppi e Bartali was a road cycling stage race that took place between 19 and 23 March 2024 in the Italian region of Emilia-Romagna and in San Marino. The race was rated as a category 2.1 event on the 2024 UCI Europe Tour calendar, and was the 39th edition of the Settimana Internazionale di Coppi e Bartali.

== Teams ==
Four of the 18 UCI WorldTeams, eight UCI ProTeams, and nine UCI Continental teams made up the 21 teams that participated in the race.

UCI WorldTeams

- EF Education–EasyPost
- Team Jayco–AlUla
- UAE Team Emirates
- Visma–Lease a Bike

UCI ProTeams

- Bingoal WB
- Lotto–Dstny
- Q36.5 Pro Cycling Team
- Polti–Kometa
- Team Corratec–Vini Fantini
- TDT–Unibet Cycling Team
- Tudor Pro Cycling Team
- VF Group–Bardiani–CSF–Faizanè

UCI Continental Teams

- Arkéa–B&B Hôtels Continentale
- General Store–Essegibi–Fratelli Curia
- GW Erco Shimano
- JCL Team Ukyo
- MG.K Vis Colors for Peace
- Petrolike
- Team MBH Bank Colpack Ballan
- Team Technipes #inEmiliaRomagna
- Work Service–Vitalcare–Dynatek

== Route ==
Stage characteristics and winners
Stage	Date	Course	Distance	Type	Winner
1	19 March	Pesaro to Pesaro	109.7 km (68.2 mi)	Mountain stage	Marco Brenner (GER)
2	20 March	Riccione to Sogliano al Rubicone	156.5 km (97.2 mi)	Hilly stage	Diego Ulissi (ITA)
3	21 March	Riccione to Riccione	132.2 km (82.1 mi)	Mountain stage	Koen Bouwman (NED)
4	22 March	Brisighella to Brisighella	150.7 km (93.6 mi)	Hilly stage	Archie Ryan (IRL)
5	23 March	Forlì to Forlì	157.9 km (98.1 mi)	Hilly stage	Jenno Berckmoes (BEL)
Total			707 km (439 mi)		

== Stages ==
=== Stage 1 ===
19 March 2024 — Pesaro to Pesaro, 109.7 km (68.2 mi)

Stage 1 Result (1–10)
Rank	Rider	Team	Time
1	Marco Brenner (GER)	Tudor Pro Cycling Team	2h 30' 38"
2	Matteo Malucelli (ITA)	JCL Team Ukyo	+ 1"
3	Jenno Berckmoes (BEL)	Lotto–Dstny	+ 1"
4	Koen Bouwman (NED)	Visma–Lease a Bike	+ 1"
5	Hartthijs de Vries (NED)	TDT–Unibet Cycling Team	+ 1"
6	Davide De Pretto (ITA)	Team Jayco–AlUla	+ 1"
7	Diego Ulissi (ITA)	UAE Team Emirates	+ 1"
8	Kristian Sbaragli (ITA)	Team Corratec–Vini Fantini	+ 1"
9	Diego Pablo Sevilla (ESP)	Polti–Kometa	+ 1"
10	Gianluca Brambilla (ITA)	Q36.5 Pro Cycling Team	+ 1"

General classification after Stage 1 (1–10)
Rank	Rider	Team	Time
1	Marco Brenner (GER)	Tudor Pro Cycling Team	2h 30' 28"
2	Matteo Malucelli (ITA)	JCL Team Ukyo	+ 5"
3	Jenno Berckmoes (BEL)	Lotto–Dstny	+ 7"
4	Koen Bouwman (NED)	Visma–Lease a Bike	+ 11"
5	Hartthijs de Vries (NED)	TDT–Unibet Cycling Team	+ 11"
6	Davide De Pretto (ITA)	Team Jayco–AlUla	+ 11"
7	Diego Ulissi (ITA)	UAE Team Emirates	+ 11"
8	Kristian Sbaragli (ITA)	Team Corratec–Vini Fantini	+ 11"
9	Diego Pablo Sevilla (ESP)	Polti–Kometa	+ 11"
10	Gianluca Brambilla (ITA)	Q36.5 Pro Cycling Team	+ 11"

=== Stage 2 ===
20 March 2024 — Riccione to Sogliano al Rubicone, 156.5 km (97.2 mi)

Stage 2 Result (1–10)
Rank	Rider	Team	Time
1	Diego Ulissi (ITA)	UAE Team Emirates	3h 55' 31"
2	Davide De Pretto (ITA)	Team Jayco–AlUla	+ 3"
3	Archie Ryan (IRL)	EF Education–EasyPost	+ 3"
4	Sylvain Moniquet (BEL)	Lotto–Dstny	+ 3"
5	Milan Vader (NED)	Visma–Lease a Bike	+ 3"
6	Koen Bouwman (NED)	Visma–Lease a Bike	+ 3"
7	Gianluca Brambilla (ITA)	Q36.5 Pro Cycling Team	+ 3"
8	Adam Ťoupalík (CZE)	TDT–Unibet Cycling Team	+ 7"
9	Domenico Pozzovivo (ITA)	VF Group–Bardiani–CSF–Faizanè	+ 8"
10	Giovanni Carboni (ITA)	JCL Team Ukyo	+ 10"

General classification after Stage 2 (1–10)
Rank	Rider	Team	Time
1	Diego Ulissi (ITA)	UAE Team Emirates	6h 26' 00"
2	Davide De Pretto (ITA)	Team Jayco–AlUla	+ 7"
3	Archie Ryan (IRL)	EF Education–EasyPost	+ 9"
4	Koen Bouwman (NED)	Visma–Lease a Bike	+ 13"
5	Gianluca Brambilla (ITA)	Q36.5 Pro Cycling Team	+ 13"
6	Sylvain Moniquet (BEL)	Lotto–Dstny	+ 13"
7	Milan Vader (NED)	Visma–Lease a Bike	+ 13"
8	Adam Ťoupalík (CZE)	TDT–Unibet Cycling Team	+ 17"
9	Jenno Berckmoes (BEL)	Lotto–Dstny	+ 18"
10	Domenico Pozzovivo (ITA)	VF Group–Bardiani–CSF–Faizanè	+ 18"

=== Stage 3 ===
21 March 2024 — Riccione to Riccione, 132.2 km (82.1 mi)

Stage 3 Result (1–10)
Rank	Rider	Team	Time
1	Koen Bouwman (NED)	Visma–Lease a Bike	3h 16' 36"
2	Louka Matthys (BEL)	Bingoal WB	+ 0"
3	Jenno Berckmoes (BEL)	Lotto–Dstny	+ 13"
4	Giovanni Carboni (ITA)	JCL Team Ukyo	+ 13"
5	Gianluca Brambilla (ITA)	Q36.5 Pro Cycling Team	+ 13"
6	Davide De Pretto (ITA)	Team Jayco–AlUla	+ 13"
7	Adam Ťoupalík (CZE)	TDT–Unibet Cycling Team	+ 7"
8	Sylvain Moniquet (BEL)	Lotto–Dstny	+ 13"
9	Thomas Pesenti (ITA)	JCL Team Ukyo	+ 13"
10	Mathys Rondel (FRA)	Tudor Pro Cycling Team	+ 13"

General classification after Stage 3 (1–10)
Rank	Rider	Team	Time
1	Koen Bouwman (NED)	Visma–Lease a Bike	9h 42' 39"
2	Diego Ulissi (ITA)	UAE Team Emirates	+ 10"
3	Louka Matthys (BEL)	Bingoal WB	+ 13"
4	Davide De Pretto (ITA)	Team Jayco–AlUla	+ 17"
5	Archie Ryan (IRL)	EF Education–EasyPost	+ 19"
6	Gianluca Brambilla (ITA)	Q36.5 Pro Cycling Team	+ 23"
7	Sylvain Moniquet (BEL)	Lotto–Dstny	+ 23"
8	Jenno Berckmoes (BEL)	Lotto–Dstny	+ 24"
9	Adam Ťoupalík (CZE)	TDT–Unibet Cycling Team	+ 27"
10	Domenico Pozzovivo (ITA)	VF Group–Bardiani–CSF–Faizanè	+ 28"

=== Stage 4 ===
22 March 2024 — Brisighella to Brisighella, 150.7 km (93.6 mi)

Stage 4 Result (1–10)
Rank	Rider	Team	Time
1	Archie Ryan (IRL)	EF Education–EasyPost	3h 32' 40"
2	Jenno Berckmoes (BEL)	Lotto–Dstny	+ 0"
3	Adam Ťoupalík (CZE)	TDT–Unibet Cycling Team	+ 0"
4	Lukas Nerurkar (GBR)	EF Education–EasyPost	+ 0"
5	Davide De Pretto (ITA)	Team Jayco–AlUla	+ 0"
6	Diego Ulissi (ITA)	UAE Team Emirates	+ 0"
7	Koen Bouwman (NED)	Visma–Lease a Bike	+ 0"
8	Sylvain Moniquet (BEL)	Lotto–Dstny	+ 0"
9	Sergio Meris (ITA)	Team MBH Bank Colpack Ballan	+ 0"
10	Paul Double (GBR)	Polti–Kometa	+ 4"

General classification after Stage 4 (1–10)
Rank	Rider	Team	Time
1	Koen Bouwman (NED)	Visma–Lease a Bike	13h 15' 19"
2	Archie Ryan (IRL)	EF Education–EasyPost	+ 9"
3	Diego Ulissi (ITA)	UAE Team Emirates	+ 10"
4	Davide De Pretto (ITA)	Team Jayco–AlUla	+ 17"
5	Jenno Berckmoes (BEL)	Lotto–Dstny	+ 18"
6	Sylvain Moniquet (BEL)	Lotto–Dstny	+ 23"
7	Adam Ťoupalík (CZE)	TDT–Unibet Cycling Team	+ 23"
8	Domenico Pozzovivo (ITA)	VF Group–Bardiani–CSF–Faizanè	+ 32"
9	Thomas Pesenti (ITA)	JCL Team Ukyo	+ 32"
10	Floris De Tier (BEL)	Bingoal WB	+ 32"

=== Stage 5 ===
23 March 2024 — Forlì to Forlì, 157.9 km (98.1 mi)

Stage 5 Result (1–10)
Rank	Rider	Team	Time
1	Jenno Berckmoes (BEL)	Lotto–Dstny	4h 20' 25"
2	Lukas Nerurkar (GBR)	EF Education–EasyPost	+ 0"
3	Davide De Pretto (ITA)	Team Jayco–AlUla	+ 0"
4	Giovanni Carboni (ITA)	JCL Team Ukyo	+ 0"
5	Gianluca Brambilla (ITA)	Q36.5 Pro Cycling Team	+ 0"
6	Alessandro Pinarello (ITA)	VF Group–Bardiani–CSF–Faizanè	+ 0"
7	Marco Brenner (GER)	Tudor Pro Cycling Team	+ 0"
8	Thomas Pesenti (ITA)	JCL Team Ukyo	+ 0"
9	Alessio Martinelli (ITA)	VF Group–Bardiani–CSF–Faizanè	+ 0"
10	Diego Ulissi (ITA)	UAE Team Emirates	+ 0"

General classification after Stage 5 (1–10)
Rank	Rider	Team	Time
1	Koen Bouwman (NED)	Visma–Lease a Bike	17h 35' 44"
2	Archie Ryan (IRL)	EF Education–EasyPost	+ 9"
3	Diego Ulissi (ITA)	UAE Team Emirates	+ 10"
4	Davide De Pretto (ITA)	Team Jayco–AlUla	+ 17"
5	Jenno Berckmoes (BEL)	Lotto–Dstny	+ 18"
6	Sylvain Moniquet (BEL)	Lotto–Dstny	+ 23"
7	Adam Ťoupalík (CZE)	TDT–Unibet Cycling Team	+ 23"
8	Domenico Pozzovivo (ITA)	VF Group–Bardiani–CSF–Faizanè	+ 32"
9	Giovanni Carboni (ITA)	JCL Team Ukyo	+ 34"
10	Thomas Pesenti (ITA)	JCL Team Ukyo	+ 36"

== Classification leadership table ==
Classification leadership by stage
Stage	Winner	General classification	Points classification	Mountains classification	Young rider classification	Team classification
1	Marco Brenner	Marco Brenner	Marco Brenner	Manuele Tarozzi	Marco Brenner	Tudor Pro Cycling Team
2	Diego Ulissi	Diego Ulissi	Diego Ulissi	Manuele Tarozzi	Davide De Pretto	Visma–Lease a Bike
3	Koen Bouwman	Koen Bouwman	Koen Bouwman	Manuele Tarozzi	Davide De Pretto	Lotto–Dstny
4	Archie Ryan	Koen Bouwman	Koen Bouwman	Manuele Tarozzi	Archie Ryan	Lotto–Dstny
5	Jenno Berckmoes	Koen Bouwman	Jenno Berckmoes	Manuele Tarozzi	Archie Ryan	Lotto–Dstny
Final		Koen Bouwman	Jenno Berckmoes	Manuele Tarozzi	Archie Ryan	Lotto–Dstny

== Classification standings ==
Legend
Denotes the winner of the general classification	Denotes the winner of the mountains classification
Denotes the winner of the points classification	Denotes the winner of the young rider classification

=== General classification ===
Final general classification (1–10)
Rank	Rider	Team	Time
1	Koen Bouwman (NED)	Visma–Lease a Bike	17h 35' 44"
2	Archie Ryan (IRL)	EF Education–EasyPost	+ 9"
3	Diego Ulissi (ITA)	UAE Team Emirates	+ 10"
4	Davide De Pretto (ITA)	Team Jayco–AlUla	+ 17"
5	Jenno Berckmoes (BEL)	Lotto–Dstny	+ 18"
6	Sylvain Moniquet (BEL)	Lotto–Dstny	+ 23"
7	Adam Ťoupalík (CZE)	TDT–Unibet Cycling Team	+ 23"
8	Domenico Pozzovivo (ITA)	VF Group–Bardiani–CSF–Faizanè	+ 32"
9	Giovanni Carboni (ITA)	JCL Team Ukyo	+ 34"
10	Thomas Pesenti (ITA)	JCL Team Ukyo	+ 36"

=== Points classification ===
Final points classification (1–10)
Rank	Rider	Team	Points
1	Jenno Berckmoes (BEL)	Lotto–Dstny	30
2	Davide De Pretto (ITA)	Team Jayco–AlUla	24
3	Koen Bouwman (NED)	Visma–Lease a Bike	20
4	Archie Ryan (IRL)	EF Education–EasyPost	16
5	Diego Ulissi (ITA)	UAE Team Emirates	15
6	Lukas Nerurkar (GBR)	EF Education–EasyPost	13
7	Marco Brenner (GER)	Tudor Pro Cycling Team	12
8	Giovanni Carboni (ITA)	JCL Team Ukyo	10
9	Gianluca Brambilla (ITA)	Q36.5 Pro Cycling Team	10
10	Adam Ťoupalík (CZE)	TDT–Unibet Cycling Team	9

=== Mountains classification ===
Final mountains classification (1–10)
Rank	Rider	Team	Points
1	Manuele Tarozzi (ITA)	VF Group–Bardiani–CSF–Faizanè	51
2	Sébastien Reichenbach (SUI)	Tudor Pro Cycling Team	28
3	Alessandro Fancellu (ITA)	Q36.5 Pro Cycling Team	16
4	Lennert Teugels (BEL)	Bingoal WB	16
5	Nariyuki Masuda (JPN)	JCL Team Ukyo	15
6	Matteo Scalco (ITA)	VF Group–Bardiani–CSF–Faizanè	10
7	Milan Donie (BEL)	Lotto–Dstny	10
8	Francesco Carollo (ITA)	MG.K Vis Colors for Peace	9
9	Diego Pescador (COL)	GW Erco Shimano	8
10	Emanuele Ansaloni (ITA)	Team Technipes #inEmiliaRomagna	8

=== Young rider classification ===
Final young rider classification (1–10)
Rank	Rider	Team	Time
1	Archie Ryan (IRL)	EF Education–EasyPost	17h 35' 53"
2	Davide De Pretto (ITA)	Team Jayco–AlUla	+ 8"
3	Jenno Berckmoes (BEL)	Lotto–Dstny	+ 9"
4	Mathys Rondel (FRA)	Tudor Pro Cycling Team	+ 27"
5	Giulio Pellizzari (ITA)	VF Group–Bardiani–CSF–Faizanè	+ 27"
6	Johannes Staune-Mittet (NOR)	Visma–Lease a Bike	+ 27"
7	Tijmen Graat (NED)	Visma–Lease a Bike	+ 1' 59"
8	Jarno Widar (BEL)	Lotto–Dstny	+ 2' 19"
9	Florian Samuel Kajamini (ITA)	Team MBH Bank Colpack Ballan	+ 2' 36"
10	Diego Pescador (COL)	GW Erco Shimano	+ 2' 36"

=== Team classification ===
Final team classification (1–10)
Rank	Team	Time
1	(Belgium) Lotto–Dstny	52h 48' 46"
2	(Italy) VF Group–Bardiani–CSF–Faizanè	+ 10"
3	(Netherlands) Visma–Lease a Bike	+ 43"
4	(United States) EF Education–EasyPost	+ 6' 37"
5	(Switzerland) Tudor Pro Cycling Team	+ 10' 45"
6	(Australia) Team Jayco–AlUla	+ 11' 01"
7	(Switzerland) Q36.5 Pro Cycling Team	+ 12' 29"
8	(Netherlands) TDT–Unibet Cycling Team	+ 14' 33"
9	(Japan) JCL Team Ukyo	+ 14' 44"
10	(United Arab Emirates) UAE Team Emirates	+ 20' 09"
