= 2024 Clásica de San Sebastián =

2024 UCI World Tour, race 26 of 35

Race details
- Dates: 10 August 2024
- Stages: 1
- Distance: 236 km (146.6 mi)
- Winning time: 5h 46' 12"

Results
	Winner	Marc Hirschi (SUI)	(UAE Team Emirates)
	Second	Julian Alaphilippe (FRA)	(Soudal–Quick-Step)
	Third	Lennert Van Eetvelt (BEL)	(Lotto–Dstny)

The 2024 Clásica de San Sebastián was a road cycling one-day race that took place on 10 August in San Sebastián, Spain. It was the 43rd edition of the Clásica de San Sebastián and the 26th event of the 2024 UCI World Tour.

== Teams ==
All the eighteen UCI WorldTeams and seven UCI ProTeams make up the twenty-five teams that will participate in the race.

UCI WorldTeams

- Alpecin–Deceuninck
- Arkéa–B&B Hotels
- Astana Qazaqstan Team
- Cofidis
- Decathlon–AG2R La Mondiale
- EF Education–EasyPost
- Groupama–FDJ
- Ineos Grenadiers
- Intermarché–Wanty
- Lidl–Trek
- Movistar Team
- Red Bull–Bora–Hansgrohe
- Soudal–Quick-Step
- Team Bahrain Victorious
- Team dsm–firmenich PostNL
- Team Jayco–AlUla
- UAE Team Emirates
- Visma–Lease a Bike

UCI Professional Continental Teams

- Caja Rural–Seguros RGA
- Equipo Kern Pharma
- Euskaltel–Euskadi
- Israel–Premier Tech
- Lotto–Dstny
- Team TotalEnergies
- Uno-X Mobility

== Result ==
Result
Rank	Rider	Team	Time
1	Marc Hirschi (SUI)	UAE Team Emirates	5h 46' 12"
2	Julian Alaphilippe (FRA)	Soudal–Quick-Step	+ 0"
3	Lennert Van Eetvelt (BEL)	Lotto–Dstny	+ 7"
4	Kevin Vermaerke (USA)	Team dsm–firmenich PostNL	+ 17"
5	Jhonatan Narváez (ECU)	Ineos Grenadiers	+ 25"
6	Neilson Powless (USA)	EF Education–EasyPost	+ 25"
7	Patrick Konrad (AUT)	Lidl–Trek	+ 25"
8	Michael Woods (CAN)	Israel–Premier Tech	+ 25"
9	Jan Christen (SUI)	UAE Team Emirates	+ 36"
10	Brandon McNulty (USA)	UAE Team Emirates	+ 37"
