= 2021 Lotto–Soudal season =

Lotto–Soudal
- 2021 season
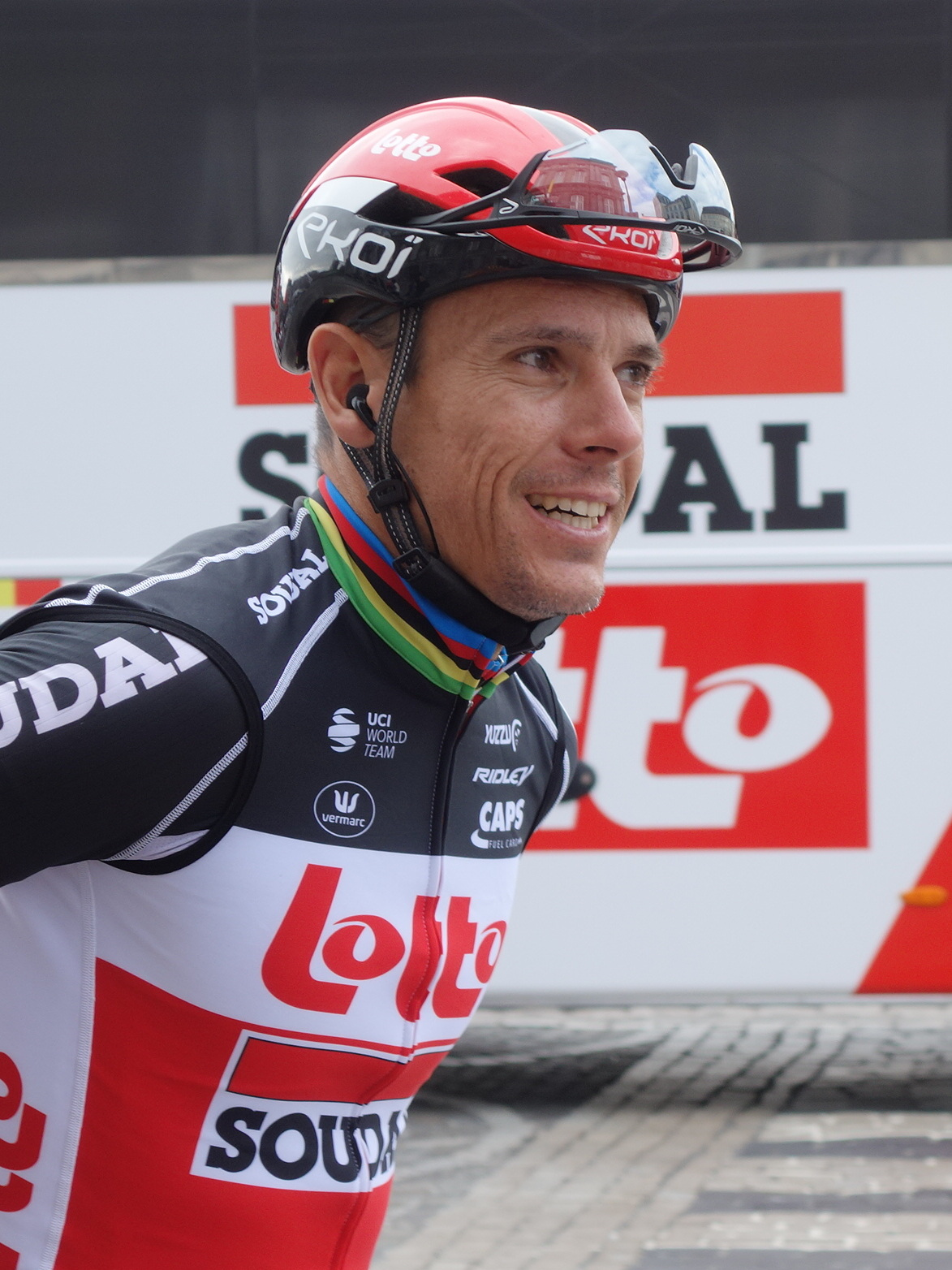
- Philippe Gilbert at Liège–Bastogne–Liège
- UCI code: LTS
- Status: UCI WorldTeam
- World Tour Rank: 18th
- Manager: John Lelangue (BEL)
- Main sponsor(s): Lotto; Soudal
- Based: Belgium
- Bicycles: Ridley
- Groupset: Campagnolo

Season victories
- Stage race overall: 1
- Stage race stages: 11
- Most wins: Caleb Ewan (AUS) (7)
- Best ranked rider: Tim Wellens (BEL) (65th)
- Jersey

The 2021 season for Lotto–Soudal was the 37th season in the team's existence and the seventh season under the current name. The team has been a UCI WorldTeam since 2005, when the tier was first established.

== Team roster ==
As of 10 June 2021.

Rider	Date of birth
Filippo Conca (ITA)	22 September 1998 (aged 22)
Steff Cras (BEL)	13 February 1996 (aged 24)
Jasper De Buyst (BEL)	24 November 1993 (aged 27)
Thomas De Gendt (BEL)	6 November 1986 (aged 34)
John Degenkolb (GER)	7 January 1989 (aged 31)
Caleb Ewan (AUS)	11 July 1994 (aged 26)
Frederik Frison (BEL)	28 July 1992 (aged 28)
Philippe Gilbert (BEL)	5 July 1982 (aged 38)
Kobe Goossens (BEL)	29 April 1996 (aged 24)
Sébastien Grignard (BEL)	29 April 1999 (aged 21)
Matthew Holmes (GBR)	8 December 1993 (aged 27)
Roger Kluge (GER)	5 February 1986 (aged 34)
Andreas Kron (DEN)	1 June 1998 (aged 22)
Kamil Małecki (POL)	2 January 1996 (aged 24)

Rider	Date of birth
Tomasz Marczyński (POL)	6 March 1984 (aged 36)
Sylvain Moniquet (BEL)	14 January 1998 (aged 22)
Stefano Oldani (ITA)	10 January 1998 (aged 22)
Harry Sweeny (AUS)	9 July 1998 (aged 22)
Gerben Thijssen (BEL)	21 June 1998 (aged 22)
Tosh Van der Sande (BEL)	28 November 1990 (aged 30)
Maxim Van Gils (BEL)	25 November 1999 (aged 21)
Brent Van Moer (BEL)	12 January 1998 (aged 22)
Harm Vanhoucke (BEL)	17 June 1997 (aged 23)
Florian Vermeersch (BEL)	12 April 1999 (aged 21)
Viktor Verschaeve (BEL)	3 August 1998 (aged 22)
Xandres Vervloesem (BEL)	13 May 2000 (aged 20)
Tim Wellens (BEL)	10 May 1991 (aged 29)

Riders who joined the team for the 2021 season

Rider	2020 team
Filippo Conca	neo-pro (Biesse–Arvedi)
Sébastien Grignard	neo-pro (Lotto–Soudal U23)
Andreas Kron	Riwal Securitas
Kamil Małecki	CCC Team
Sylvain Moniquet	neo-pro (Équipe Continentale Groupama–FDJ)
Harry Sweeny	neo-pro (Lotto–Soudal U23)
Maxim Van Gils	neo-pro (Lotto–Soudal U23)
Viktor Verschaeve	neo-pro (Lotto–Soudal U23)
Xandres Vervloesem	neo-pro (Lotto–Soudal U23)

Riders who left the team during or after the 2020 season

Rider	2021 team
Sander Armée	Team Qhubeka Assos
Stan Dewulf	AG2R Citroën Team
Jonathan Dibben	Retired
Carl Fredrik Hagen	Israel Start-Up Nation
Adam Hansen	Retired (Ironman triathlete)
Rasmus Byriel Iversen	Hernin CK
Nikolas Maes	Retired
Rémy Mertz	Bingoal WB
Brian van Goethem	Retired
Jelle Wallays	Cofidis

== Season victories ==
Date	Race	Competition	Rider	Country	Location	Ref.
5 February	Étoile de Bessèges, Stage 3	UCI Europe Tour	Tim Wellens (BEL)	France	Bessèges	
7 February	Étoile de Bessèges, Overall	UCI Europe Tour	Tim Wellens (BEL)	France		
7 February	Étoile de Bessèges, Team classification	UCI Europe Tour	(Note: The riders in the squad were John Degenkolb, Philippe Gilbert, Andreas Kron, Stefano Oldani, Gerben Thijssen, Brent Van Moer, and Tim Wellens.)	France		
14 February	Tour de la Provence, Mountains classification	UCI Europe Tour; UCI ProSeries	Filippo Conca (ITA)	France		
27 February	UAE Tour, Stage 7	UCI World Tour	Caleb Ewan (AUS)	United Arab Emirates	Abu Dhabi	
22 March	Volta a Catalunya, Stage 1	UCI World Tour	Andreas Kron (DEN)	Spain	Calella	
28 March	Volta a Catalunya, Stage 7	UCI World Tour	Thomas De Gendt (BEL)	Spain	Barcelona	
2 May	Tour de Romandie, Mountains classification	UCI World Tour	Kobe Goossens (BEL)	Switzerland		
12 May	Giro d'Italia, Stage 5	UCI World Tour	Caleb Ewan (AUS)	Italy	Cattolica	
14 May	Giro d'Italia, Stage 7	UCI World Tour	Caleb Ewan (AUS)	Italy	Termoli	
30 May	Critérium du Dauphiné, Stage 1	UCI World Tour	Brent Van Moer (BEL)	France	Issoire	
11 June	Tour de Suisse, Stage 6	UCI World Tour	Andreas Kron (DEN)	Switzerland	Disentis-Sedrun	
11 June	Tour of Belgium, Stage 3	UCI Europe Tour; UCI ProSeries	Caleb Ewan (AUS)	Belgium	Scherpenheuvel-Zichem	
12 June	Tour of Belgium, Stage 4	UCI Europe Tour; UCI ProSeries	Caleb Ewan (AUS)	Belgium	Hamoir	
13 June	Tour of Belgium, Points classification	UCI Europe Tour; UCI ProSeries	Caleb Ewan (AUS)	Belgium		
24 July	Tour de Wallonie, Mountains classification	UCI Europe Tour; UCI ProSeries	Florian Vermeersch (BEL)	Belgium		
31 July	Tour de l'Ain, Team classification	UCI Europe Tour	(Note: The riders in the squad were Steff Cras, Frederik Frison, Andreas Kron, Sylvain Moniquet, Harm Vanhoucke, and Florian Vermeersch.)	France		
3 September	Benelux Tour, Stage 5	UCI World Tour	Caleb Ewan (AUS)	Belgium	Bilzen	
