= Julian Mertens =

Belgian cyclist

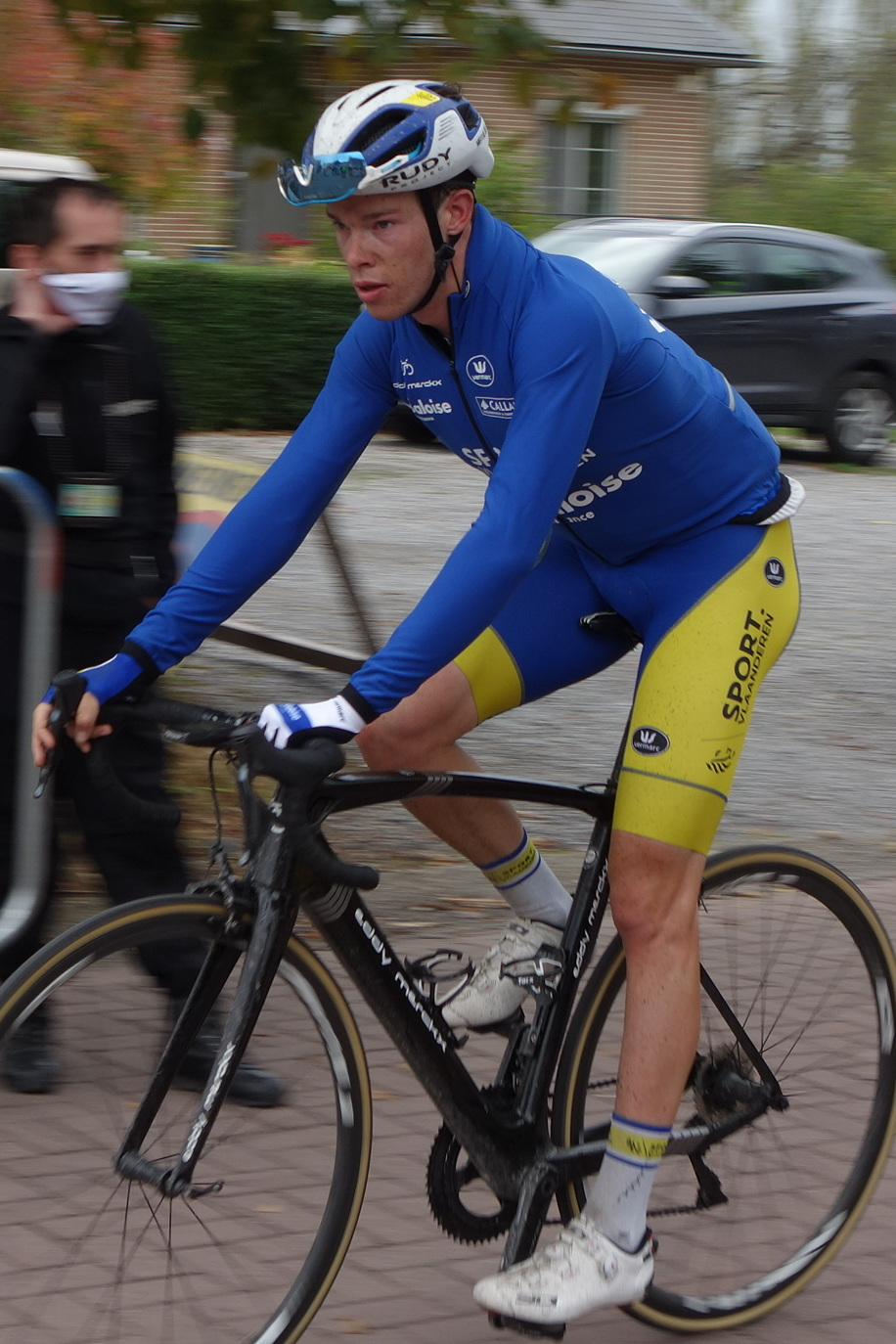
- Mertens at the 2020 La Flèche Wallonne

Personal information
- Full name: Julian Mertens
- Born: 6 October 1997 (age 29) Turnhout, Belgium
- Height: 1.8 m (5 ft 11 in)
- Weight: 67 kg (148 lb)

Cycling career
- Sport: Cycling
- Current team: Wagner Bazin WB
- Discipline: Road
- Role: Rider

Amateur teams
- 2016: Prorace
- 2017: VL Technics–Experza–Abutriek
- 2018–2019: Lotto–Soudal U23

Professional teams
- 2020–2022: Sport Vlaanderen–Baloise
- 2023–: Bingoal WB

Julian Mertens (born 6 October 1997) is a Belgian professional racing cyclist, who currently rides for UCI ProTeam Wagner Bazin WB. In September 2020, he rode in the 2020 La Flèche Wallonne race in Belgium.

== Major results ==
2016
1st Stage 3 Keizer der Juniores
6th La Philippe Gilbert Juniors
9th Overall Aubel–Thimister–La Gleize
2017
8th Flèche Ardennaise
2018
3rd Overall Ronde de l'Isard
6th Grand Prix de la Ville de Lillers
7th Liège–Bastogne–Liège U23
8th Eschborn–Frankfurt Under–23
9th Flèche Ardennaise
10th Overall Circuit des Ardennes
2019
3rd Lillehammer GP
4th Flèche Ardennaise
6th Paris–Troyes
7th Liège–Bastogne–Liège U23
8th Grand Prix des Marbriers
10th Overall Tour de Bretagne
