= 2025 Lotto season =

Lotto
- 2025 season
- UCI code: LTS
- Status: UCI ProTeam
- Manager: Stéphane Heulot (FRA)
- Main sponsor(s): Lotto
- Based: Belgium
- Bicycles: Orbea
- Groupset: Shimano

Season victories
- Stage race stages: 2
- Most wins: (Belgium) Arnaud De Lie (Italy) Elia Viviani (1 each)

The 2025 season for Lotto is the 41st season in the team's existence and the third as a UCI ProTeam.

== Team roster ==
All ages are as of 1 January 2025, the first day of the 2025 season.

As of 5 January 2025.

Rider	Date of birth
Jenno Berckmoes (BEL)	4 February 2001 (aged 23)
Cédric Beullens (BEL)	27 January 1997 (aged 27)
Lars Craps (BEL)	17 October 2001 (aged 23)
Logan Currie (NZL)	24 June 2001 (aged 23)
Jasper De Buyst (BEL)	24 November 1993 (aged 31)
Arnaud De Lie (BEL)	16 March 2002 (aged 22)
Steffen De Schuyteneer (BEL)	24 February 2005 (aged 19)
Jarrad Drizners (AUS)	31 May 1999 (aged 25)
Joshua Giddings (GBR)	20 July 2003 (aged 21)
Jonas Gregaard (DEN)	30 July 1996 (aged 28)
Sébastien Grignard (BEL)	29 April 1999 (aged 25)
Arjen Livyns (BEL)	1 September 1994 (aged 30)
Milan Menten (BEL)	31 October 1996 (aged 28)

Rider	Date of birth
Robin Orins (BEL)	6 March 2002 (aged 22)
Alec Segaert (BEL)	16 January 2003 (aged 21)
Eduardo Sepúlveda (ARG)	13 June 1991 (aged 33)
Liam Slock (BEL)	18 September 2000 (aged 24)
Lionel Taminiaux (BEL)	19 May 1996 (aged 28)
Reuben Thompson (NZL)	15 February 2001 (aged 23)
Jarne Van de Paar (BEL)	23 October 2000 (aged 24)
Lorenz Van de Wynkele (BEL)	19 August 2001 (aged 23)
Lennert Van Eetvelt (BEL)	17 July 2001 (aged 23)
Brent Van Moer (BEL)	12 January 1998 (aged 26)
Henri Vandenabeele (BEL)	15 April 2000 (aged 24)
Baptiste Veistroffer (FRA)	29 May 2000 (aged 24)

== Season victories ==
Date	Race	Competition	Rider	Country	Location	Ref.
7 February	Étoile de Bessèges, stage 3	UCI Europe Tour	Arnaud De Lie (BEL)	France	Bessèges	
3 May	Presidential Tour of Turkey, stage 7	UCI ProSeries	Elia Viviani (ITA)	Turkey	Çeşme	
