= Planckaert =

Planckaert is a Belgian surname that may refer to

- Andre Planckaert (born 1944), Belgian cyclist, brother of Jef
- Baptiste Planckaert (born 1988), Belgian cyclist
- Eddy Planckaert (born 1958), Belgian cyclist, brother of Walter and Willy
- Edward Planckaert (born 1995), Belgian cyclist
- Emiel Planckaert (born 1996), Belgian cyclist
- Francesco Planckaert (born 1982), Belgian cyclist, son of Eddy
- Jef Planckaert (1934–2007), Belgian cyclist, brother of Andre
- Jo Planckaert (born 1970), Belgian cyclist, son on Willy
- Walter Planckaert (born 1948), Belgian cyclist, brother of Eddy and Willy
- Willy Planckaert (born 1944), Belgian cyclist, brother of Eddy and Walter
