= Viktor Verschaeve =

Belgian cyclist (born 1998)

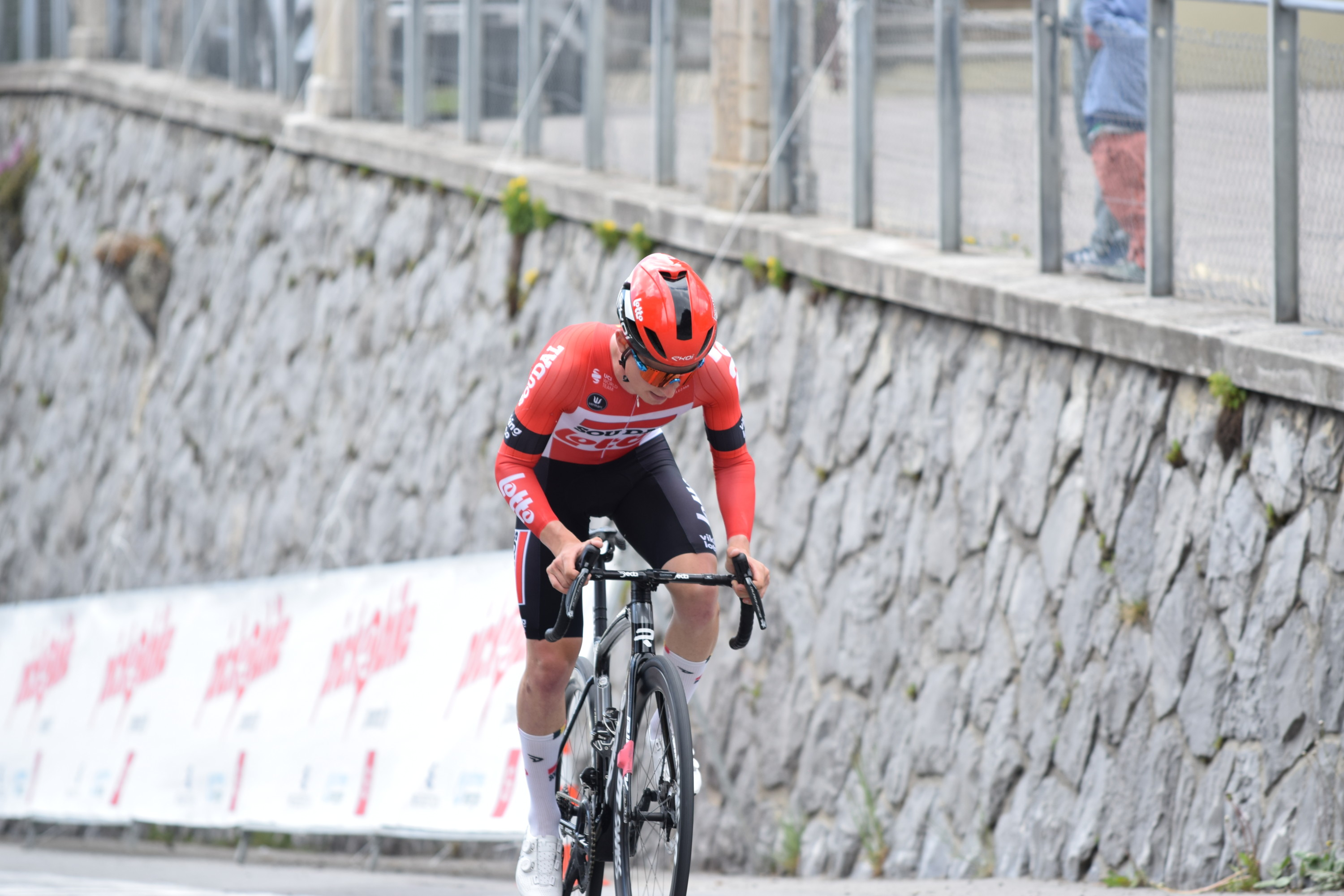
- Verschaeve at the 2022 Tour de Romandie

Personal information
- Born: 3 August 1998 (age 28) Brasschaat, Belgium
- Height: 1.71 m (5 ft 7 in)
- Weight: 60 kg (132 lb)

Cycling career
- Sport: Cycling
- Current team: Retired
- Discipline: Road
- Role: Rider

Amateur teams
- 2016: Van Moer Logistics
- 2017–2018: EFC–L&R–Vulsteke
- 2019–2020: Lotto–Soudal U23

Professional teams
- 2021–2022: Lotto–Soudal
- 2023: Lotto–Dstny Development Team

Viktor Verschaeve (born 3 August 1998) is a Belgian former cyclist, who competed as a professional from 2021 to May 2023.

== Major results ==
2015
1st Stage 1 Keizer der Juniores
2016
2nd La Route des Géants
2018
5th Road race, National Under–23 Road Championships
5th Circuit de Wallonie
9th Overall Grand Prix Priessnitz spa
2019
2nd Liège–Bastogne–Liège U23
5th Flèche Ardennaise
8th Overall Ronde de l'Isard
9th Overall Giro Ciclistico d'Italia
2020
1st Stage 2 Tour de Savoie Mont-Blanc
