= Emiel Planckaert =

Belgian cyclist

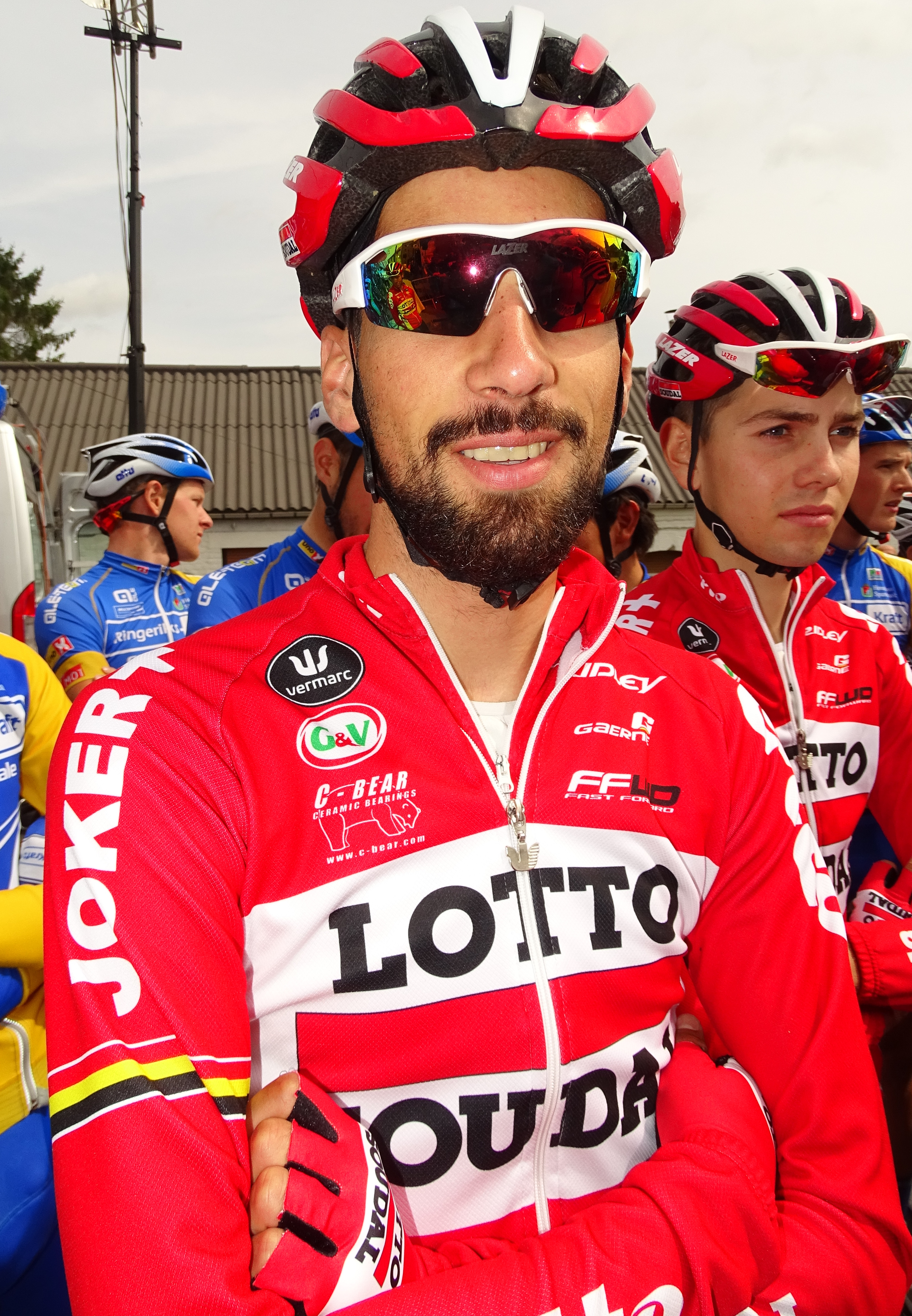
- Planckaert in 2015.

Personal information
- Full name: Emiel Planckaert
- Born: 22 October 1996 (age 29) Kortrijk, Belgium
- Height: 1.83 m (6 ft 0 in)
- Weight: 69 kg (152 lb)

Cycling career
- Sport: Cycling
- Current team: Decock–Van Eyck–Van Mossel Devos–Capoen
- Discipline: Road
- Role: Rider

Amateur teams
- 2013–2014: Avia–Crabbé
- 2015–2017: Lotto–Soudal U23
- 2022–: Decock–Van Eyck–Van Mossel Devos–Capoen

Professional teams
- 2017: Lotto–Soudal (stagiaire)
- 2018–2020: Sport Vlaanderen–Baloise

Emiel Planckaert (born 22 October 1996) is a Belgian road cyclist, who rides for Belgian amateur team Decock–Van Eyck–Van Mossel Devos–Capoen. He previously rode professionally between 2017 and 2020 for the Lotto–Soudal and Sport Vlaanderen–Baloise teams, before retiring from professional racing at the end of the 2020 season, planning to continue to compete as an amateur.

== Personal life ==
His brothers Baptiste Planckaert and Edward Planckaert are also professional cyclists.

== Major results ==
2013
4th Overall Aubel–Thimister–La Gleize
2014
9th Overall Aubel–Thimister–La Gleize
2015
5th Overall Course de la Solidarité Olympique

1st Young rider classification

8th De Kustpijl
2016
1st Grand Prix des Marbriers
2017
7th Overall Ronde de l'Isard
9th Overall Tour de Bretagne
10th Grand Prix Criquielion
