= Vanhoof =

Vanhoof is a surname. Notable people with the surname include:

- Elke Vanhoof (born 1991), Belgian BMX rider
- Ward Vanhoof (born 1999), Belgian cyclist
