= Joseph Abbeel =

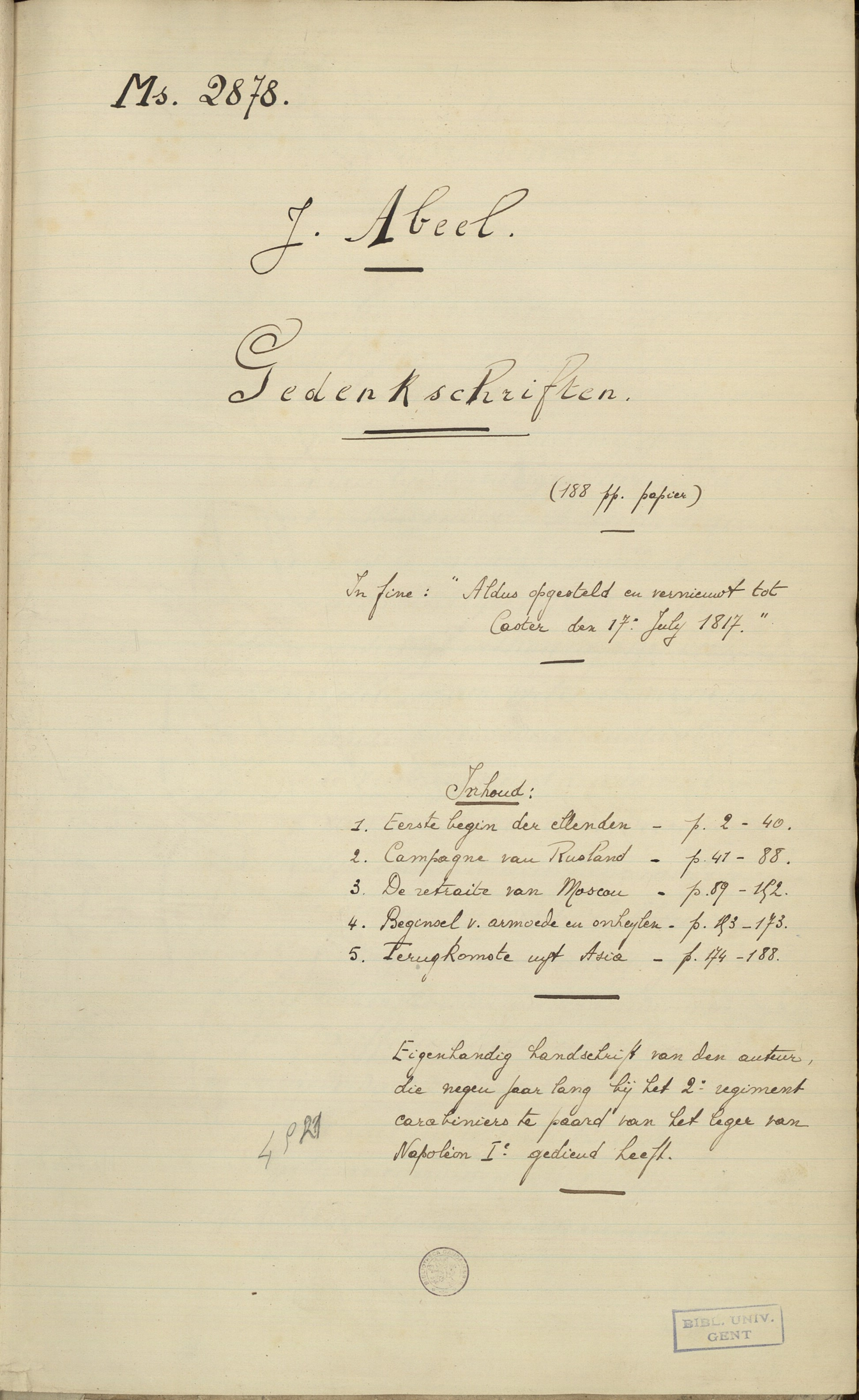
- Except from Abbeel's Manuscript
- Born: October 31, 1786; Vrasene
- Died: September 25, 1866 (aged 79); Anzegem
- Military career
- Allegiance: Napoleon Bonaparte
- Service years: 1812-1815
- Rank: Carabinier
- Known for: Writing memoirs of his battles.
- Conflicts: French Invasion of Russia, Battle of Borodino
- Other work: School Teacher

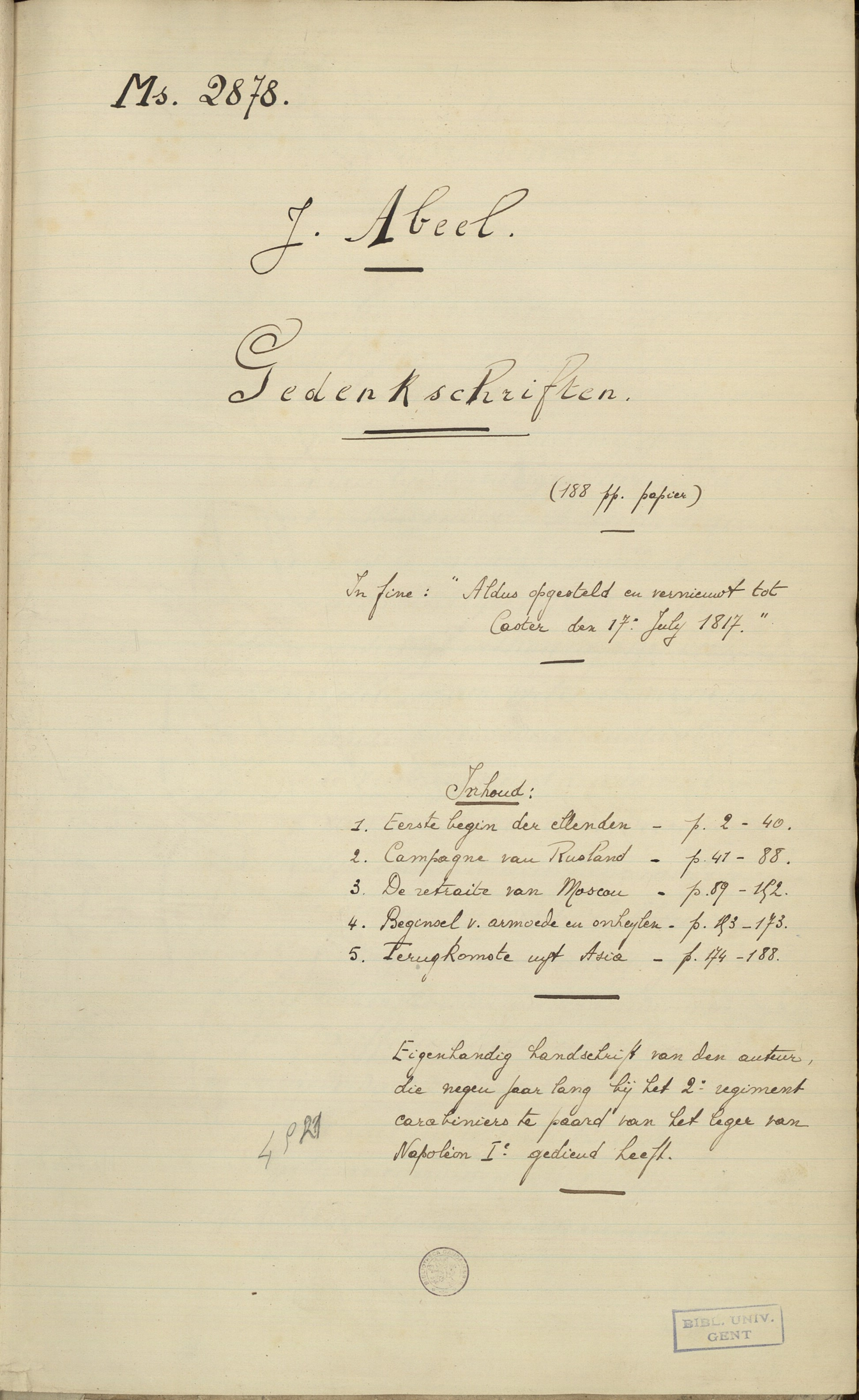
Excerpt from the manuscript "Memoires on Napoleon's campaigns, experienced as a soldier of the second regiment". Written by Joseph Abbeel, 1805-1815.

Joseph Abbeel (1786 in Vrasene – 1866 in Anzegem) was a Belgian soldier who was conscripted to the French Army of Napoleon Bonaparte. In the position of a carabinier he witnessed the French invasion of Russia in 1812.

He is one of the few who survived the devastating horror of the raid on Moscow and the chaotic retreat that followed it. He was wounded at the Battle of Borodino. He saw Moscow burn, followed the retreating French Army, but was captured by Cossacks in the vicinity of Hamburg. It was only in 1815 that he came home. He never married. It is assumed that he became a school teacher.

He wrote down his memoirs almost immediately, but never published them. They were rediscovered and edited two centuries later. This, together with Jakob Walter's diary, forms the only known records of that campaign kept by common soldiers. Abbeel's story contains some minor historical mistakes, mostly due to his lack of geographical knowledge, but the authenticity of the manuscript is undisputed.
