= 2022 UAE Tour =

Emirati cycling race

2022 UCI World Tour, race 1 of 32

Race details
- Dates: 20–26 February 2022
- Stages: 7
- Distance: 1,058 km (657 mi)
- Winning time: 25h 38' 16"

Results
| Jersey awarded to the overall winner | Winner | Tadej Pogačar (SLO) | (UAE Team Emirates) |
| | Second | Adam Yates (GBR) | (INEOS Grenadiers) |
| | Third | Pello Bilbao (ESP) | (Team Bahrain Victorious) |
| Jersey awarded to the points classification winner | Points | Jasper Philipsen (BEL) | (Alpecin–Fenix) |
| Jersey awarded to the young rider classification winner | Young rider | Tadej Pogačar (SLO) | (UAE Team Emirates) |
| Jersey awarded to the sprints classification winner | Sprints | Dmitry Strakhov (RUS) | (Gazprom–RusVelo) |
| | Team | UAE Team Emirates | |

The 2022 UAE Tour was a road cycling stage race that took place between 20 and 26 February 2022 in the United Arab Emirates. It was the fourth edition of the UAE Tour and the opening race of the 2022 UCI World Tour.

== Teams ==
All but one of the 18 UCI WorldTeams, and three UCI ProTeams, make up the 20 teams that are participating in the race. Cofidis, the only UCI WorldTeam to not be participating in the race, declined their invitation, citing a full schedule. Alpecin–Fenix and Arkéa–Samsic received automatic invitations as the best performing UCI ProTeams in the 2021 season, but only the former accepted their invitation. The other two UCI ProTeams, Bardiani–CSF–Faizanè and Gazprom–RusVelo, were selected by RCS Sport, the race organisers.

With many teams experiencing positive COVID-19 test results and having to withdraw riders and staff from competition, only 10 teams were able to enter a full squad of seven riders, with a further seven teams entering six riders each. Intermarché–Wanty–Gobert Matériaux and Trek–Segafredo were only able to enter five riders each, while Lotto–Soudal was the only team to enter a squad of four riders. Gazprom–RusVelo also had one late non-starter, reducing their squad to six riders. In total, 125 riders started the race, of which 122 finished.

UCI WorldTeams

- AG2R Citroën Team
- Astana Qazaqstan Team
- Bora–Hansgrohe
- EF Education–EasyPost
- Groupama–FDJ
- INEOS Grenadiers
- Intermarché–Wanty–Gobert Matériaux
- Israel–Premier Tech
- Lotto–Soudal
- Movistar Team
- Quick-Step Alpha Vinyl Team
- Team Bahrain Victorious
- Team BikeExchange–Jayco
- Team DSM
- Team Jumbo–Visma
- Trek–Segafredo
- UAE Team Emirates

UCI ProTeams

- Alpecin–Fenix
- Bardiani–CSF–Faizanè
- Gazprom–RusVelo

== Route ==
Stage characteristics and winners
| Stage | Date | Course | Distance | Type | Stage winner |
|---|---|---|---|---|---|
| 1 | 20 February | Madinat Zayed to Madinat Zayed | 184 km (114 mi) | Flat stage | Jasper Philipsen (BEL) |
| 2 | 21 February | Al Hudayriat Island to Abu Dhabi Breakwater | 176 km (109 mi) | Flat stage | Mark Cavendish (GBR) |
| 3 | 22 February | Ajman (Al Zorah) | 9 km (5.6 mi) | Individual time trial | Stefan Bissegger (SUI) |
| 4 | 23 February | Fujairah Fort to Jebel Jais | 181 km (112 mi) | Mountain stage | Tadej Pogačar (SLO) |
| 5 | 24 February | Ras Al Khaimah Corniche to Al Marjan Island | 182 km (113 mi) | Flat stage | Jasper Philipsen (BEL) |
| 6 | 25 February | Expo 2020 Dubai to Expo 2020 Dubai | 180 km (110 mi) | Flat stage | Mathias Vacek (CZE) |
| 7 | 26 February | Al Ain (Al Jahili Fort) to Jebel Hafeet | 148 km (92 mi) | Mountain stage | Tadej Pogačar (SLO) |
| Total | | | 1,058 km (657 mi) | | |

== Stages ==
=== Stage 1 ===
20 February 2022 — Madinat Zayed to Madinat Zayed, 184 km (114 mi)

Stage 1 Result (1–10)
| Rank | Rider | Team | Time |
|---|---|---|---|
| 1 | Jasper Philipsen (BEL) | Alpecin–Fenix | 4h 42' 34" |
| 2 | Sam Bennett (IRL) | Bora–Hansgrohe | + 0" |
| 3 | Elia Viviani (ITA) | INEOS Grenadiers | + 0" |
| 4 | Dylan Groenewegen (NED) | Team BikeExchange–Jayco | + 0" |
| 5 | Emīls Liepiņš (LAT) | Trek–Segafredo | + 0" |
| 6 | Arnaud Démare (FRA) | Groupama–FDJ | + 0" |
| 7 | Max Kanter (GER) | Movistar Team | + 0" |
| 8 | Olav Kooij (NED) | Team Jumbo–Visma | + 0" |
| 9 | Tom Devriendt (BEL) | Intermarché–Wanty–Gobert Matériaux | + 0" |
| 10 | Pascal Ackermann (GER) | UAE Team Emirates | + 0" |

General classification after Stage 1 (1–10)
| Rank | Rider | Team | Time |
|---|---|---|---|
| 1 | Jasper Philipsen (BEL) | Alpecin–Fenix | 4h 42' 24" |
| 2 | Sam Bennett (IRL) | Bora–Hansgrohe | + 4" |
| 3 | Dmitry Strakhov (RUS) | Gazprom–RusVelo | + 4" |
| 4 | Elia Viviani (ITA) | INEOS Grenadiers | + 6" |
| 5 | Alessandro Tonelli (ITA) | Bardiani–CSF–Faizanè | + 6" |
| 6 | Xandres Vervloesem (BEL) | Lotto–Soudal | + 8" |
| 7 | Dylan Groenewegen (NED) | Team BikeExchange–Jayco | + 10" |
| 8 | Emīls Liepiņš (LAT) | Trek–Segafredo | + 10" |
| 9 | Arnaud Démare (FRA) | Groupama–FDJ | + 10" |
| 10 | Max Kanter (GER) | Movistar Team | + 10" |

=== Stage 2 ===
21 February 2022 – Al Hudayriat Island to Abu Dhabi Breakwater, 176 km (109 mi)

Stage 2 Result (1–10)
| Rank | Rider | Team | Time |
|---|---|---|---|
| 1 | Mark Cavendish (GBR) | Quick-Step Alpha Vinyl Team | 4h 20' 45" |
| 2 | Jasper Philipsen (BEL) | Alpecin–Fenix | + 0" |
| 3 | Pascal Ackermann (GER) | UAE Team Emirates | + 0" |
| 4 | Olav Kooij (NED) | Team Jumbo–Visma | + 0" |
| 5 | Arnaud Démare (FRA) | Groupama–FDJ | + 0" |
| 6 | Matteo Malucelli (ITA) | Gazprom–RusVelo | + 0" |
| 7 | Emīls Liepiņš (LAT) | Trek–Segafredo | + 0" |
| 8 | Tom Devriendt (BEL) | Intermarché–Wanty–Gobert Matériaux | + 0" |
| 9 | Michael Schwarzmann (GER) | Lotto–Soudal | + 0" |
| 10 | Marijn van den Berg (NED) | EF Education–EasyPost | + 0" |

General classification after Stage 2 (1–10)
| Rank | Rider | Team | Time |
|---|---|---|---|
| 1 | Jasper Philipsen (BEL) | Alpecin–Fenix | 9h 03' 03" |
| 2 | Dmitry Strakhov (RUS) | Gazprom–RusVelo | + 4" |
| 3 | Mark Cavendish (GBR) | Quick-Step Alpha Vinyl Team | + 6" |
| 4 | Sam Bennett (IRL) | Bora–Hansgrohe | + 10" |
| 5 | Pascal Ackermann (GER) | UAE Team Emirates | + 12" |
| 6 | Elia Viviani (ITA) | INEOS Grenadiers | + 12" |
| 7 | Michael Kukrle (CZE) | Gazprom–RusVelo | + 12" |
| 8 | Alessandro Tonelli (ITA) | Bardiani–CSF–Faizanè | + 12" |
| 9 | Xandres Vervloesem (BEL) | Lotto–Soudal | + 14" |
| 10 | Arnaud Démare (FRA) | Groupama–FDJ | + 16" |

=== Stage 3 ===
22 February 2022 – Ajman (Al Zorah), 9 km (5.6 mi) (ITT)

Stage 3 Result (1–10)
| Rank | Rider | Team | Time |
|---|---|---|---|
| 1 | Stefan Bissegger (SUI) | EF Education–EasyPost | 9' 43" |
| 2 | Filippo Ganna (ITA) | INEOS Grenadiers | + 7" |
| 3 | Tom Dumoulin (NED) | Team Jumbo–Visma | + 14" |
| 4 | Tadej Pogačar (SLO) | UAE Team Emirates | + 18" |
| 5 | João Almeida (POR) | UAE Team Emirates | + 22" |
| 6 | Mikkel Bjerg (DEN) | UAE Team Emirates | + 24" |
| 7 | Stefan de Bod (RSA) | Astana Qazaqstan Team | + 24" |
| 8 | Aleksandr Vlasov (RUS) | Bora–Hansgrohe | + 25" |
| 9 | Johan Price-Pejtersen (DEN) | Team Bahrain Victorious | + 26" |
| 10 | Jasper Philipsen (BEL) | Alpecin–Fenix | + 28" |

General classification after Stage 3 (1–10)
| Rank | Rider | Team | Time |
|---|---|---|---|
| 1 | Stefan Bissegger (SUI) | EF Education–EasyPost | 9h 13' 02" |
| 2 | Filippo Ganna (ITA) | INEOS Grenadiers | + 7" |
| 3 | Jasper Philipsen (BEL) | Alpecin–Fenix | + 12" |
| 4 | Tom Dumoulin (NED) | Team Jumbo–Visma | + 14" |
| 5 | Tadej Pogačar (SLO) | UAE Team Emirates | + 18" |
| 6 | João Almeida (POR) | UAE Team Emirates | + 22" |
| 7 | Stefan de Bod (RSA) | Astana Qazaqstan Team | + 24" |
| 8 | Aleksandr Vlasov (RUS) | Bora–Hansgrohe | + 25" |
| 9 | Neilson Powless (USA) | EF Education–EasyPost | + 28" |
| 10 | Adam Yates (GBR) | INEOS Grenadiers | + 29" |

=== Stage 4 ===
23 February 2022 – Fujairah Fort to Jebel Jais, 181 km (112 mi)

Stage 4 Result (1–10)
| Rank | Rider | Team | Time |
|---|---|---|---|
| 1 | Tadej Pogačar (SLO) | UAE Team Emirates | 4h 49' 24" |
| 2 | Adam Yates (GBR) | INEOS Grenadiers | + 0" |
| 3 | Aleksandr Vlasov (RUS) | Bora–Hansgrohe | + 0" |
| 4 | Ruben Guerreiro (POR) | EF Education–EasyPost | + 3" |
| 5 | Damien Howson (AUS) | Team BikeExchange–Jayco | + 3" |
| 6 | Romain Bardet (FRA) | Team DSM | + 3" |
| 7 | Jai Hindley (AUS) | Bora–Hansgrohe | + 3" |
| 8 | Geoffrey Bouchard (FRA) | AG2R Citroën Team | + 3" |
| 9 | Jan Hirt (CZE) | Intermarché–Wanty–Gobert Matériaux | + 3" |
| 10 | Pello Bilbao (ESP) | Team Bahrain Victorious | + 3" |

General classification after Stage 4 (1–10)
| Rank | Rider | Team | Time |
|---|---|---|---|
| 1 | Tadej Pogačar (SLO) | UAE Team Emirates | 14h 02' 34" |
| 2 | Filippo Ganna (ITA) | INEOS Grenadiers | + 2" |
| 3 | Aleksandr Vlasov (RUS) | Bora–Hansgrohe | + 13" |
| 4 | Adam Yates (GBR) | INEOS Grenadiers | + 15" |
| 5 | Neilson Powless (USA) | EF Education–EasyPost | + 23" |
| 6 | João Almeida (POR) | UAE Team Emirates | + 28" |
| 7 | Pello Bilbao (ESP) | Team Bahrain Victorious | + 35" |
| 8 | Óscar Rodríguez (ESP) | Movistar Team | + 38" |
| 9 | Ruben Guerreiro (POR) | EF Education–EasyPost | + 40" |
| 10 | Geoffrey Bouchard (FRA) | AG2R Citroën Team | + 41" |

=== Stage 5 ===
24 February 2022 – Ras Al Khaimah Corniche to Al Marjan Island, 182 km (113 mi)

Stage 5 Result (1–10)
| Rank | Rider | Team | Time |
|---|---|---|---|
| 1 | Jasper Philipsen (BEL) | Alpecin–Fenix | 4h 17' 05" |
| 2 | Olav Kooij (NED) | Team Jumbo–Visma | + 0" |
| 3 | Sam Bennett (IRL) | Bora–Hansgrohe | + 0" |
| 4 | Matteo Malucelli (ITA) | Gazprom–RusVelo | + 0" |
| 5 | Rudy Barbier (FRA) | Israel–Premier Tech | + 0" |
| 6 | Elia Viviani (ITA) | INEOS Grenadiers | + 0" |
| 7 | Arnaud Démare (FRA) | Groupama–FDJ | + 0" |
| 8 | Alberto Dainese (ITA) | Team DSM | + 0" |
| 9 | Max Kanter (GER) | Movistar Team | + 0" |
| 10 | Marc Brustenga (ESP) | Trek–Segafredo | + 0" |

General classification after Stage 5 (1–10)
| Rank | Rider | Team | Time |
|---|---|---|---|
| 1 | Tadej Pogačar (SLO) | UAE Team Emirates | 18h 19' 37" |
| 2 | Filippo Ganna (ITA) | INEOS Grenadiers | + 4" |
| 3 | Aleksandr Vlasov (RUS) | Bora–Hansgrohe | + 14" |
| 4 | Adam Yates (GBR) | INEOS Grenadiers | + 17" |
| 5 | Neilson Powless (USA) | EF Education–EasyPost | + 25" |
| 6 | João Almeida (POR) | UAE Team Emirates | + 30" |
| 7 | Pello Bilbao (ESP) | Team Bahrain Victorious | + 37" |
| 8 | Óscar Rodríguez (ESP) | Movistar Team | + 40" |
| 9 | Ruben Guerreiro (POR) | EF Education–EasyPost | + 42" |
| 10 | Geoffrey Bouchard (FRA) | AG2R Citroën Team | + 43" |

=== Stage 6 ===
25 February 2022 – Expo 2020 Dubai to Expo 2020 Dubai, 180 km (110 mi)

Stage 6 Result (1–10)
| Rank | Rider | Team | Time |
|---|---|---|---|
| 1 | Mathias Vacek (CZE) | Gazprom–RusVelo | 3h 58' 10" |
| 2 | Paul Lapeira (FRA) | AG2R Citroën Team | + 0" |
| 3 | Dmitry Strakhov (RUS) | Gazprom–RusVelo | + 0" |
| 4 | Alessandro Tonelli (ITA) | Bardiani–CSF–Faizanè | + 0" |
| 5 | Pavel Kochetkov (RUS) | Gazprom–RusVelo | + 5" |
| 6 | Jasper Philipsen (BEL) | Alpecin–Fenix | + 15" |
| 7 | Dylan Groenewegen (NED) | Team BikeExchange–Jayco | + 15" |
| 8 | Pascal Ackermann (GER) | UAE Team Emirates | + 15" |
| 9 | Rudy Barbier (FRA) | Israel–Premier Tech | + 15" |
| 10 | Jonathan Milan (ITA) | Team Bahrain Victorious | + 15" |

General classification after Stage 6 (1–10)
| Rank | Rider | Team | Time |
|---|---|---|---|
| 1 | Tadej Pogačar (SLO) | UAE Team Emirates | 22h 18' 02" |
| 2 | Filippo Ganna (ITA) | INEOS Grenadiers | + 4" |
| 3 | Aleksandr Vlasov (RUS) | Bora–Hansgrohe | + 14" |
| 4 | Adam Yates (GBR) | INEOS Grenadiers | + 17" |
| 5 | Neilson Powless (USA) | EF Education–EasyPost | + 25" |
| 6 | João Almeida (POR) | UAE Team Emirates | + 30" |
| 7 | Pello Bilbao (ESP) | Team Bahrain Victorious | + 37" |
| 8 | Óscar Rodríguez (ESP) | Movistar Team | + 40" |
| 9 | Ruben Guerreiro (POR) | EF Education–EasyPost | + 42" |
| 10 | Geoffrey Bouchard (FRA) | AG2R Citroën Team | + 43" |

=== Stage 7 ===
26 February 2022 – Al Ain (Al Jahili Fort) to Jebel Hafeet, 148 km (92 mi)

Stage 7 Result (1–10)
| Rank | Rider | Team | Time |
|---|---|---|---|
| 1 | Tadej Pogačar (SLO) | UAE Team Emirates | 3h 20' 24" |
| 2 | Adam Yates (GBR) | INEOS Grenadiers | + 1" |
| 3 | Pello Bilbao (ESP) | Team Bahrain Victorious | + 5" |
| 4 | João Almeida (POR) | UAE Team Emirates | + 15" |
| 5 | Lucas Plapp (AUS) | INEOS Grenadiers | + 16" |
| 6 | Carlos Verona (ESP) | Movistar Team | + 16" |
| 7 | Rafał Majka (POL) | UAE Team Emirates | + 16" |
| 8 | Aleksandr Vlasov (RUS) | Bora–Hansgrohe | + 30" |
| 9 | Geoffrey Bouchard (FRA) | AG2R Citroën Team | + 53" |
| 10 | Chris Harper (AUS) | Team Jumbo–Visma | + 53" |

General classification after Stage 7 (1–10)
| Rank | Rider | Team | Time |
|---|---|---|---|
| 1 | Tadej Pogačar (SLO) | UAE Team Emirates | 25h 38' 16" |
| 2 | Adam Yates (GBR) | INEOS Grenadiers | + 22" |
| 3 | Pello Bilbao (ESP) | Team Bahrain Victorious | + 48" |
| 4 | Aleksandr Vlasov (RUS) | Bora–Hansgrohe | + 54" |
| 5 | João Almeida (POR) | UAE Team Emirates | + 55" |
| 6 | Carlos Verona (ESP) | Movistar Team | + 1' 17" |
| 7 | Rafał Majka (POL) | UAE Team Emirates | + 1' 24" |
| 8 | Geoffrey Bouchard (FRA) | AG2R Citroën Team | + 1' 46" |
| 9 | Romain Bardet (FRA) | Team DSM | + 1' 46" |
| 10 | David de la Cruz (ESP) | Astana Qazaqstan Team | + 1' 58" |

== Classification leadership table ==
Classification leadership by stage
| Stage | Winner | General classification | Points classification | Sprints classification | Young rider classification | Team classification |
|---|---|---|---|---|---|---|
| 1 | Jasper Philipsen | Jasper Philipsen | Jasper Philipsen | Dmitry Strakhov | Jasper Philipsen | Bora–Hansgrohe |
| 2 | Mark Cavendish | Jasper Philipsen | Jasper Philipsen | Dmitry Strakhov | Jasper Philipsen | EF Education–EasyPost |
| 3 | Stefan Bissegger | Stefan Bissegger | Jasper Philipsen | Dmitry Strakhov | Stefan Bissegger | EF Education–EasyPost |
| 4 | Tadej Pogačar | Tadej Pogačar | Jasper Philipsen | Dmitry Strakhov | Tadej Pogačar | UAE Team Emirates |
| 5 | Jasper Philipsen | Tadej Pogačar | Jasper Philipsen | Dmitry Strakhov | Tadej Pogačar | UAE Team Emirates |
| 6 | Mathias Vacek | Tadej Pogačar | Jasper Philipsen | Dmitry Strakhov | Tadej Pogačar | UAE Team Emirates |
| 7 | Tadej Pogačar | Tadej Pogačar | Jasper Philipsen | Dmitry Strakhov | Tadej Pogačar | UAE Team Emirates |
| Final | | Tadej Pogačar | Jasper Philipsen | Dmitry Strakhov | Tadej Pogačar | UAE Team Emirates |

- On stage 2, Sam Bennett, who was third in the points classification, wore the green jersey, because first-placed Jasper Philipsen wore the red jersey as the leader of the general classification and second-placed Dmitry Strakhov wore the black jersey as the leader of the sprints classification. For the same reason, Mark Cavendish wore the green jersey on stage 3.
- On stages 2 and 3, Xandres Vervloesem, who was second in the young rider classification, wore the white jersey, because first-placed Jasper Philipsen wore the red jersey as the leader of the general classification.
- On stage 4, Tadej Pogačar, who was second in the young rider classification, wore the white jersey, because first-placed Stefan Bissegger wore the red jersey as the leader of the general classification.
- On stages 5–7, João Almeida, who was second in the young rider classification, wore the white jersey, because first-placed Tadej Pogačar wore the red jersey as the leader of the general classification.

== Final classification standings ==
Legend
| Denotes the winner of the general classification | Denotes the winner of the sprints classification |
| Denotes the winner of the points classification | Denotes the winner of the young rider classification |

=== General classification ===
Final general classification (1–10)
| Rank | Rider | Team | Time |
|---|---|---|---|
| 1 | Tadej Pogačar (SLO) | UAE Team Emirates | 25h 38' 16" |
| 2 | Adam Yates (GBR) | INEOS Grenadiers | + 22" |
| 3 | Pello Bilbao (ESP) | Team Bahrain Victorious | + 48" |
| 4 | Aleksandr Vlasov (RUS) | Bora–Hansgrohe | + 54" |
| 5 | João Almeida (POR) | UAE Team Emirates | + 55" |
| 6 | Carlos Verona (ESP) | Movistar Team | + 1' 17" |
| 7 | Rafał Majka (POL) | UAE Team Emirates | + 1' 24" |
| 8 | Geoffrey Bouchard (FRA) | AG2R Citroën Team | + 1' 46" |
| 9 | Romain Bardet (FRA) | Team DSM | + 1' 46" |
| 10 | David de la Cruz (ESP) | Astana Qazaqstan Team | + 1' 58" |

=== Points classification ===
Final points classification (1–10)
| Rank | Rider | Team | Points |
|---|---|---|---|
| 1 | Jasper Philipsen (BEL) | Alpecin–Fenix | 76 |
| 2 | Dmitry Strakhov (RUS) | Gazprom–RusVelo | 69 |
| 3 | Tadej Pogačar (SLO) | UAE Team Emirates | 54 |
| 4 | Adam Yates (GBR) | INEOS Grenadiers | 32 |
| 5 | Pavel Kochetkov (RUS) | Gazprom–RusVelo | 29 |
| 6 | Alessandro Tonelli (ITA) | Bardiani–CSF–Faizanè | 28 |
| 7 | Olav Kooij (NED) | Team Jumbo–Visma | 28 |
| 8 | Sam Bennett (IRL) | Bora–Hansgrohe | 28 |
| 9 | Stefan Bissegger (SUI) | EF Education–EasyPost | 21 |
| 10 | Mathias Vacek (CZE) | Gazprom–RusVelo | 21 |

=== Sprints classification ===
Final sprints classification (1–10)
| Rank | Rider | Team | Points |
|---|---|---|---|
| 1 | Dmitry Strakhov (RUS) | Gazprom–RusVelo | 57 |
| 2 | Pavel Kochetkov (RUS) | Gazprom–RusVelo | 22 |
| 3 | Alessandro Tonelli (ITA) | Bardiani–CSF–Faizanè | 19 |
| 4 | Luca Rastelli (ITA) | Bardiani–CSF–Faizanè | 14 |
| 5 | Jasper Philipsen (BEL) | Alpecin–Fenix | 14 |
| 6 | Jakob Egholm (DEN) | Trek–Segafredo | 13 |
| 7 | Gianni Vermeersch (BEL) | Alpecin–Fenix | 10 |
| 8 | Michael Kukrle (CZE) | Gazprom–RusVelo | 10 |
| 9 | Daryl Impey (RSA) | Israel–Premier Tech | 8 |
| 10 | Michael Mørkøv (DEN) | Quick-Step Alpha Vinyl Team | 8 |

=== Young rider classification ===
Final young rider classification (1–10)
| Rank | Rider | Team | Time |
|---|---|---|---|
| 1 | Tadej Pogačar (SLO) | UAE Team Emirates | 25h 38' 16" |
| 2 | João Almeida (POR) | UAE Team Emirates | + 55" |
| 3 | Luke Plapp (AUS) | INEOS Grenadiers | + 2' 11" |
| 4 | Gino Mäder (SUI) | Team Bahrain Victorious | + 2' 42" |
| 5 | Thymen Arensman (NED) | Team DSM | + 2' 47" |
| 6 | Andreas Leknessund (NOR) | Team DSM | + 3' 20" |
| 7 | Sebastian Berwick (AUS) | Israel–Premier Tech | + 3' 56" |
| 8 | Samuele Zoccarato (ITA) | Bardiani–CSF–Faizanè | + 5' 43" |
| 9 | Vadim Pronskiy (KAZ) | Astana Qazaqstan Team | + 7' 43" |
| 10 | Luca Covili (ITA) | Bardiani–CSF–Faizanè | + 8' 39" |

=== Team classification ===
Final team classification (1–10)
| Rank | Team | Time |
|---|---|---|
| 1 | UAE Team Emirates | 76h 56' 52" |
| 2 | Team DSM | + 5' 38" |
| 3 | Team Bahrain Victorious | + 9' 08" |
| 4 | Intermarché–Wanty–Gobert Matériaux | + 9' 26" |
| 5 | EF Education–EasyPost | + 10' 31" |
| 6 | Astana Qazaqstan Team | + 11' 00" |
| 7 | Movistar Team | + 11' 49" |
| 8 | Bora–Hansgrohe | + 13' 29" |
| 9 | Team Jumbo–Visma | + 15' 07" |
| 10 | INEOS Grenadiers | + 18' 21" |
