= Robin Orins =

Belgian cyclist

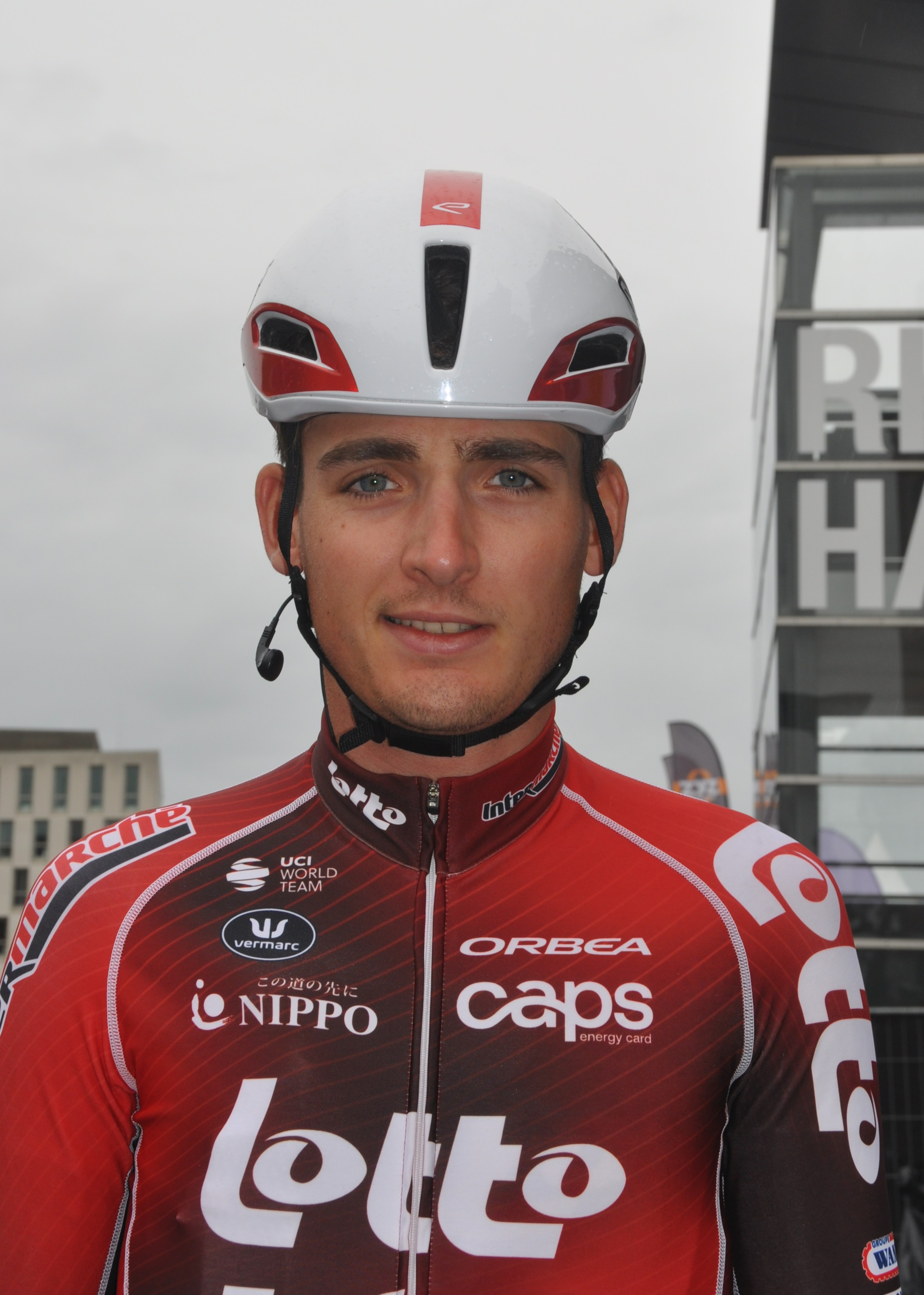
- Robin Orins at the 2026 Rund um Köln

Personal information
- Born: 6 March 2002 (age 24) Heestert, Belgium
- Height: 1.90 m (6 ft 3 in)

Cycling career
- Sport: Cycling
- Current team: Lotto–Intermarché
- Discipline: Road
- Role: Rider
- Rider type: Time trialist

Amateur team
- 2019–2021: Acrog–Pauwels Sauzen

Professional teams
- 2021: Black Spoke Pro Cycling (stagiaire)
- 2022: Elevate p/b Home Solution–Soenens
- 2023–2024: Lotto–Dstny Development Team
- 2025–: Lotto

Robin Orins (born 6 March 2002) is a Belgian cyclist, who currently rides for UCI WorldTeam Lotto–Intermarché.

== Major results ==
2022
4th Time trial, National Under-23 Road Championships
8th Liège–Bastogne–Liège Espoirs
9th Hel van Voerendaal
2023
2nd Time trial, National Under-23 Road Championships
3rd Paris–Roubaix Espoirs
4th La Get Up Cup
6th Gent–Wevelgem U23
8th Brussel-Opwijk
2024
1st Time trial, National Under-23 Road Championships
1st Omloop Het Nieuwsblad Beloften
1st Memorial Igor Decraene
2nd Liège–Bastogne–Liège Espoirs
2nd Hel van Voerendaal
3rd Paris–Roubaix Espoirs
4th Time trial, UEC European Under-23 Road Championships
5th Time trial, UCI Road World Under-23 Championships
8th Overall Orlen Nations Grand Prix
