= Ruben Apers =

Belgian cyclist

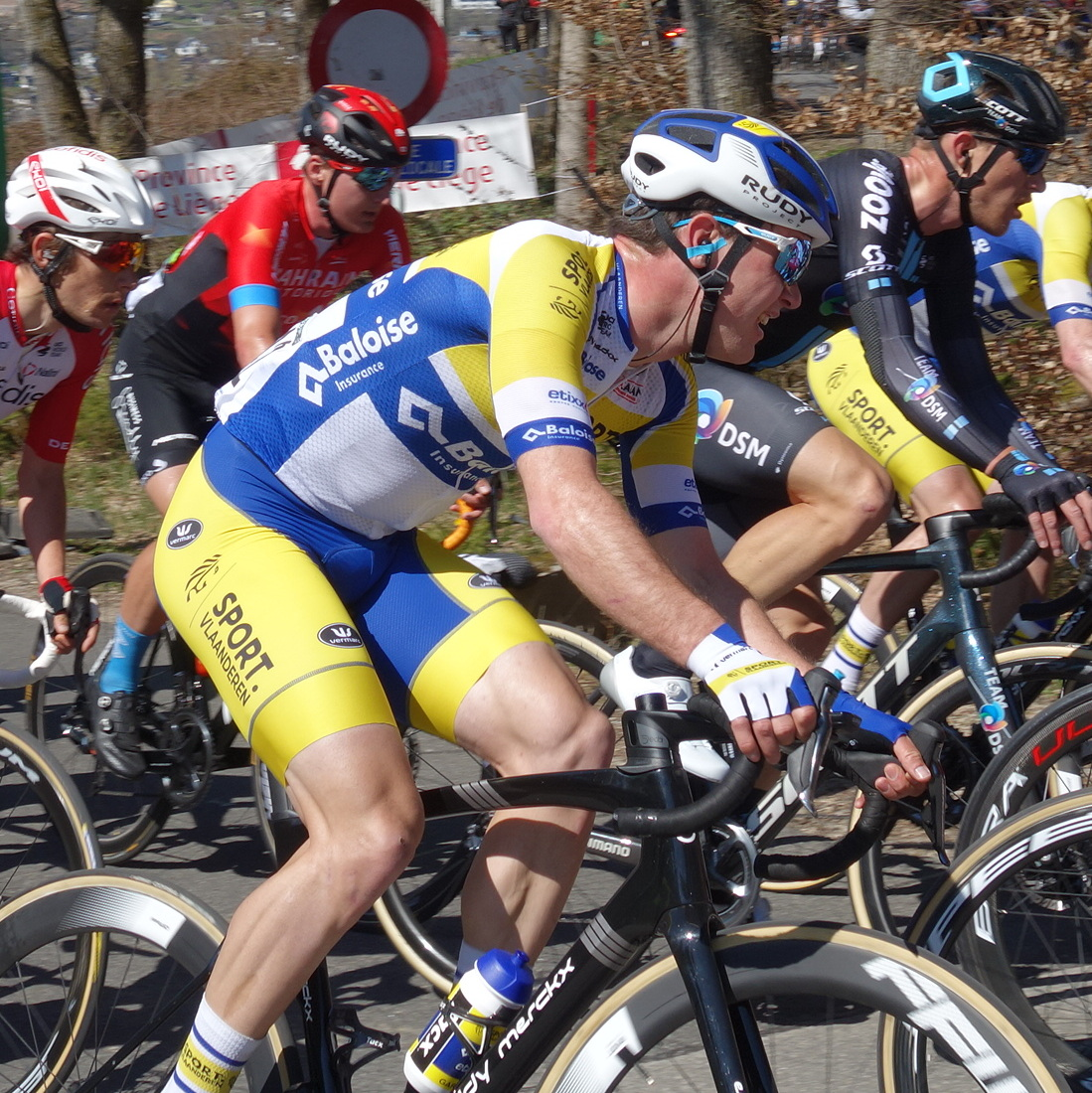
- Apers at the 2021 Liège–Bastogne–Liège

Personal information
- Born: 25 August 1998 (age 28) Vrasene, Belgium
- Height: 1.79 m (5 ft 10 in)
- Weight: 70 kg (154 lb)

Cycling career
- Sport: Cycling
- Current team: Ribble Rebellion
- Disciplines: Road; Gravel
- Role: Rider

Amateur teams
- 2016: Isorex
- 2017–2020: Lotto–Soudal U23
- 2024–: Ribble Rebellion

Professional team
- 2021–2023: Sport Vlaanderen–Baloise

Ruben Apers (born 25 August 1998) is a Belgian racing cyclist, who currently rides for British club team Ribble Rebellion.

== Major results ==
2016
3rd Overall Niedersachsen-Rundfahrt der Junioren
5th Time trial, UCI Junior Road World Championships
6th Overall Aubel–Thimister–La Gleize
6th Trofeo Emilio Paganessi
2020
1st Young rider classification, Course de Solidarność et des Champions Olympiques
10th Overall Tour Bitwa Warszawska 1920
2022
6th Egmont Cycling Race
