= Bjorg Lambrecht =

Belgian cyclist (1997–2019)

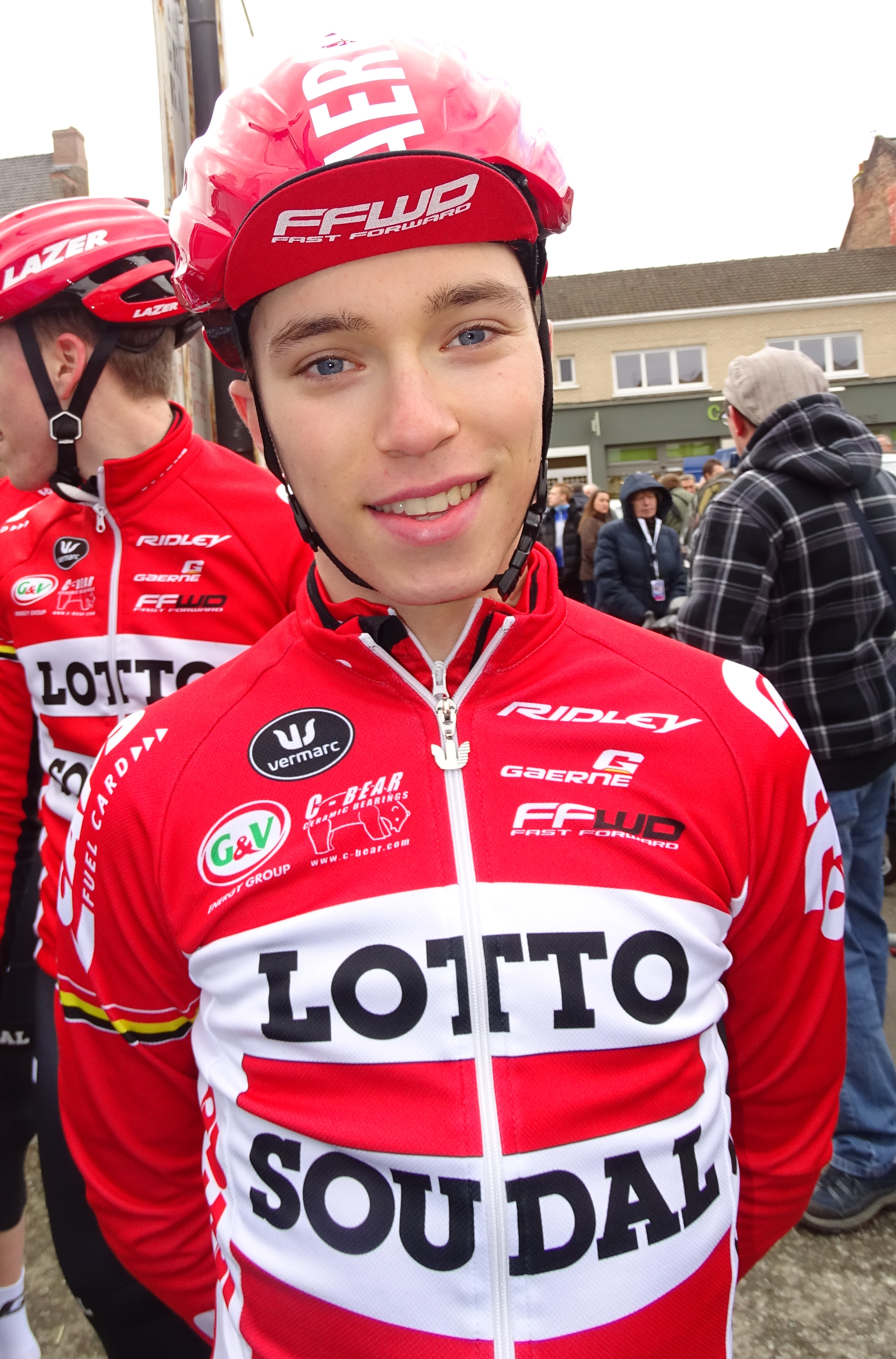
- Lambrecht in 2016

Personal information
- Full name: Bjorg Lambrecht
- Born: 2 April 1997 Ghent, Belgium
- Died: 5 August 2019 (aged 22) Rybnik, Poland
- Height: 169 cm (5 ft 7 in)
- Weight: 56 kg (123 lb)

Cycling career
- Sport: Cycling
- Discipline: Road
- Role: Cyclist

Amateur team
- 2016–2017: Lotto–Soudal U23

Professional team
- 2018–2019: Lotto–Soudal
Medal record
Representing Belgium
Men's road bicycle racing
World Championships
Silver medal – second place	2018 Innsbruck	Under-23 road race
European Championships
Silver medal – second place	2016 Plumelec	Under-23 road race

Bjorg Lambrecht (2 April 1997 – 5 August 2019) was a Belgian cyclist who rode for UCI WorldTeam Lotto–Soudal. In August 2018, he was named in the startlist for the 2018 Vuelta a España. He died on 5 August 2019 after crashing into a concrete culvert during the third stage of the 2019 Tour de Pologne.

== Early life and family ==
Lambrecht came from the Belgian town of Knesselare, situated between Bruges and Ghent. He was born to Kurt and Anje Lambrecht and had a sister, Britt.

== Career ==
In 2015, Lambrecht became the Belgian national junior champion, relegating Glen Van Nuffelen and Stijn Goolaerts to second and third places respectively.

In 2016, he caused a surprise by winning the opening stage of the Ronde de l'Isard. In the final stage he was sent in the wrong direction by the race management. The race jury recognized the error and so Lambrecht became the third Belgian to win this race after Yannick Eijssen (2010) and Louis Vervaeke (2014). Just under two weeks after his final win in France, Lambrecht took part in the Grand Prix Priessnitz spa race with a Belgian selection. Here he managed to win the last leg, with a sloping finish on cobbles in Jeseník, with a lead of a few seconds.

At the beginning of 2017, he won Liège–Bastogne–Liège U23 race by beating his three fellow poursuivants in the sprint. Later that year he was fifth in the Flèche Ardennaise race, second in the final classification of the Ronde de l'Isard, eighth in that of the Tour of the Jura, he won a stage and the final classification in the Grand Prix Priessnitz spa and became second in the final classifications of the Tour de Savoie Mont-Blanc, the Giro della Valle d'Aosta and the Tour de l'Avenir 2017.

In 2018, Lambrecht turned professional with Lotto–Soudal. In 2019, he recorded his biggest result as a professional, finishing fourth at the Flèche Wallonne race. In April of the same year, he signed a two-year contract extension with Lotto–Soudal.

== Death ==
Lambrecht crashed into a concrete culvert during stage three of the 2019 Tour de Pologne. The cause of the crash is unknown, no other riders appeared to have been involved. He was taken to hospital in Rybnik by ambulance, but died during surgery. Out of respect for Lambrecht, the fourth stage of the race was neutralised, allowing riders to honour his memory. The remaining members of the Lotto-Soudal team led the peloton in the first part of the race until kilometre 48, where Lambrecht had crashed the previous day, at which point the peloton stopped and a moment of silence was held. On 7 August 2019, Lotto–Soudal's team doctor, Maarten Meirhaeghe, said in a press statement that Lambrecht's death was caused by "a severe laceration to his liver that caused an internal hemorrhage and a cardiac arrest".

Lambrecht was buried on 13 August 2019 in Saint Willibrord Church in his home town of Knesselare. Hundreds attended the service, including many former Lotto–Soudal teammates, some of whom carried the coffin into the church. On 11 August, a minute's silence was held before the 2019 European Road Championships in honour of Lambrecht. On 25 August, another minute's silence was held before Stage 2 of the Vuelta a España, the first Grand Tour that Lambrecht would have competed in. His race number, 143, was retired for all subsequent editions of the Tour de Pologne.

== Major results ==
The following are some of the major achievements of Lambrecht.

2015
1st Road race, National Junior Road Championships
Driedaagse van Axel

1st Mountains classification
1st Stage 4

2nd Overall Oberösterreich Juniorenrundfahrt

1st Mountains classification

3rd Overall GP Général Patton

1st Mountains classification

3rd Overall Aubel–Thimister–La Gleize
3rd Trofeo Emilio Paganessi
3rd La Philippe Gilbert Juniors
4th Overall Trofeo Karlsberg
2016
1st Overall Ronde de l'Isard

1st Points classification
1st Young rider classification
1st Mountains classification
1st Stage 1

2nd Road race, UEC European Under-23 Road Championships
3rd Piccolo Giro di Lombardia
4th Flèche Ardennaise
4th Overall Course de la Paix U23

1st Stage 3

10th Overall Tour de Savoie Mont Blanc
10th Overall Giro della Valle d'Aosta
2017
1st Overall Grand Prix Priessnitz spa

1st Points classification
1st Stage 2

1st Liège–Bastogne–Liège Espoirs
2nd Overall Giro della Valle d'Aosta

1st Points classification

2nd Overall Ronde de l'Isard

1st Stage 3

2nd Overall Tour de Savoie Mont Blanc
2nd Overall Tour de l'Avenir
5th Flèche Ardennaise
8th Overall Tour du Jura

1st Young rider classification

10th Overall Circuit des Ardennes
2018
2nd Road race, UCI Road World Under-23 Championships
2nd Overall Tour des Fjords

1st Young rider classification
1st Stage 3

2019
1st Young rider classification, Critérium du Dauphiné
4th La Flèche Wallonne
5th Brabantse Pijl
6th Amstel Gold Race
