= Ward Vanhoof =

Belgian cyclist

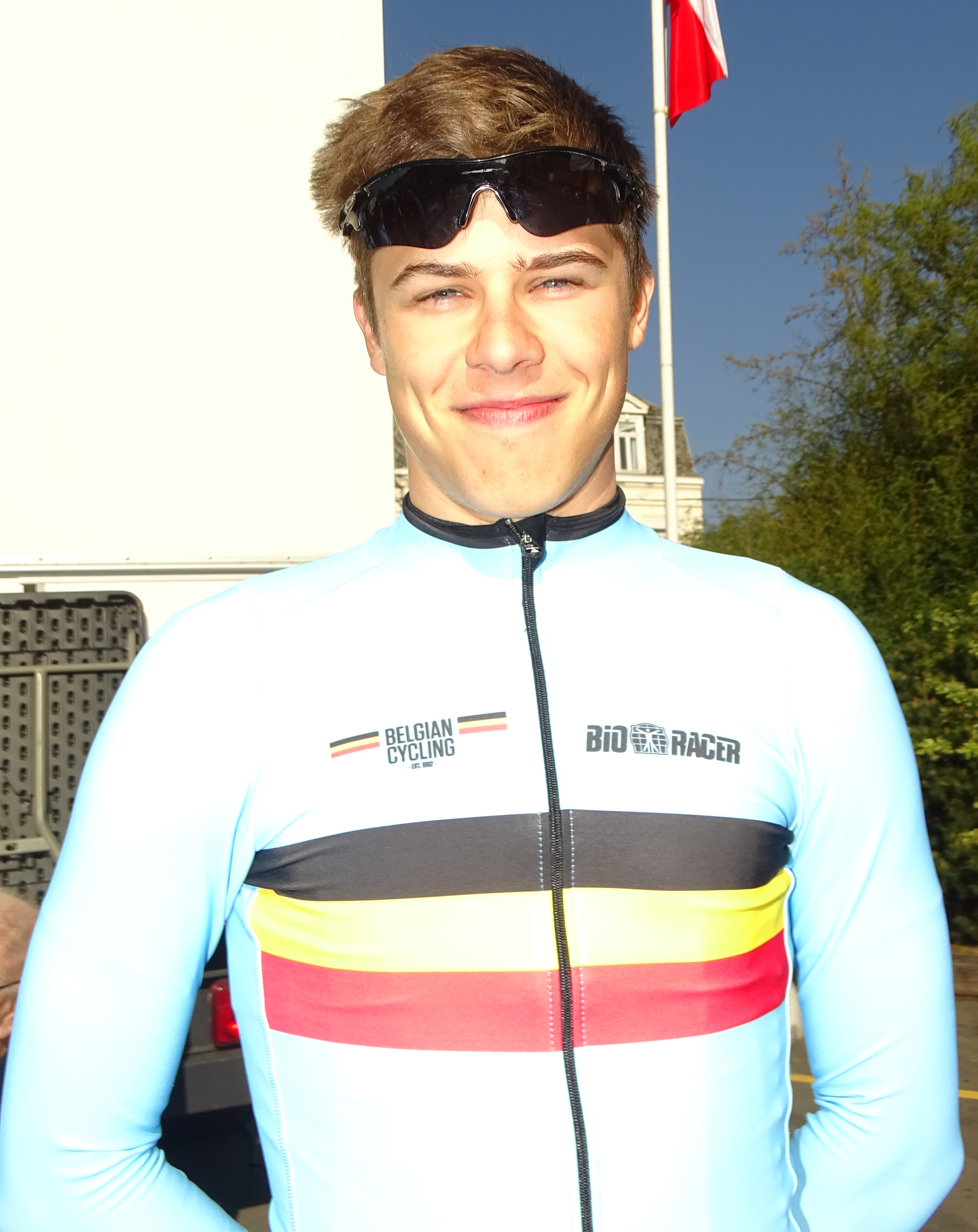
- Ward Vanhoof in 2017

Personal information
- Born: 18 April 1999 (age 27) Mol, Belgium
- Height: 1.86 m (6 ft 1 in)
- Weight: 74 kg (163 lb)

Cycling career
- Sport: Cycling
- Current team: Team Flanders–Baloise
- Discipline: Road
- Role: Rider

Amateur teams
- 2016–2017: Acrog–Balen BC
- 2018–2020: Lotto–Soudal U23

Professional team
- 2021–: Sport Vlaanderen–Baloise

Ward Vanhoof (born 18 April 1999) is a Belgian racing cyclist, who currently rides UCI ProTeam Team Flanders–Baloise.

== Major results ==
2016
9th Overall Ain Bugey Valromey Tour

1st Young rider classification

2017
3rd Time trial, National Junior Road Championships
3rd Overall Driedaagse van Axel
5th Overall Aubel–Thimister–La Gleize
7th Ronde van Vlaanderen Juniores
7th La Philippe Gilbert juniors
7th Guido Reybrouck Classic
8th Overall Ain Bugey Valromey Tour
9th Paris–Roubaix Juniors
9th Overall Ronde des Vallées
10th La route des Géants
2019
4th Paris–Roubaix Espoirs
5th Sundvolden GP
6th Paris–Tours Espoirs
7th Internationale Wielertrofee Jong Maar Moedig
2022
9th Grand Prix de la ville de Pérenchies
