= Jakob Walter =

German soldier and chronicler of the Napoleonic Wars (1788-1864)

Jakob Walter (September 28, 1788 – August 3, 1864) was a German soldier and chronicler of the Napoleonic Wars. In his later years, he wrote an account of his service in the Grande Armée, including a detailed account of his participation in Napoleon's Russian campaign of 1812. This, together with Joseph Abbeel's diary, form the only known records of that campaign kept by common soldiers.

== Early life ==
Jakob Walter was born in 1788 in the town of Rosenberg, near Ellwangen in the Duchy of Württemberg in the Holy Roman Empire. The area a few years later became part of the short-lived Confederation of the Rhine founded by Napoleon and was at that point a French vassal state.

By trade, Walter was a stonemason. He was a Roman Catholic and seems to have been devout; in his book, he condemns the Brandenburgian peasants for not attending Mass, and at one point tells how he destroyed a book he considered heretical. Walter recorded his sins as well. Walter's faith was a common focal point of hope throughout the war.

== First and Second Campaigns ==
In 1806, Walter and his brother were conscripted into the regiment of Heinrich Eberhard von Romig and served in the campaign of 1806-1807 in Poland, as part of King Jérôme’s contribution to the Grande Armée. He returned home in 1807 and was recalled for the campaign of 1809 in Austria. After this campaign he returned to civilian life and remained a private citizen through 1810 and 1811.

== The Russian Campaign ==
In 1812, Walter was recalled once again for the Grande Armée's invasion of Russia. Originally Walter's regiment was under the command of the Crown Prince of Württemberg, but for the campaign of 1812 it was transferred to the command of Marshal Ney.

=== March to Moscow ===
As a common soldier, Walter had a limited view of the scope of the campaigns he was involved in. By far the greater part of his time was spent on the march, and most of his memoir concerns foraging; he speaks of the difficulty of forcing peasants to show where their food was hidden.

Finally we arrived at Polotsk, a large city on the other side of the Western Dvina River. In this region I once left the bivouac to seek provisions. There were eight of us, and we came to a very distant village. Here we searched all the houses. There were no peasants left. I later realized how heedless I had been, since each one ran into a house alone, broke open everything that was covered, and searched all the floors and still nothing was found. Finally, when we assembled and were ready to leave, I once more inspected a little hut somewhat removed from the village. Around it from top to bottom were heaped bundles of hemp and shives, which I tore down; and, as I worked my way to the ground, sacks full of flour appeared. Now I joyfully called all my comrades so that we might dispose of the booty. In the village we saw sieves; these we took to sift the flour mixed with chaff an inch long; and, after that, we refilled the sacks. ... Then the question of carrying and dividing the grain arose, but it occurred to me that I had seen a horse in one of the houses. Everyone immediately hurried to find the horse. We found two instead of one, but unfortunately they were both colts, and one could not be used at all. We took the largest, placed two sacks on it, and started out very slowly. While we were marching there, the Russians saw us from a distance with this booty; and at the same moment we saw a troop of peasants in the valley, about fifty. These ran toward us. What could we do but shoot at them?

He describes the extremes of heat and cold (made worse because he abandoned his extra clothing in the hot weather, and then suffered in the cold) and notes that more soldiers died from thirst than anything else, because there was very little good water on the route. At times he survived on dough balls made from looted flour mixed with muddy water and roasted in a fire; for almost a week he lived on a jar of honey he dug up from where a peasant had hidden it.

As both a German and a conscript, Walter had no particular loyalty to Napoleon. He rarely mentions him, and when he does he generally refers to him simply as "Bonaparte." He had no knowledge of the larger strategy of the campaign; his descriptions of combat are chaotic, as in his description of the assault on the city of Smolensk on August 17, 1812:

So, as soon as day broke —we marched against the city. The river was crossed below the city. The suburbs on the northern side were stormed, set on fire, and burned up. My company's doctor, named Staüble, had his arm shot away in crossing the stream, and he died afterward. No longer could I pay any attention to my comrades and, therefore, knew not in what way they perished or were lost. Everyone fired and struck at the enemy in wild madness, and no one could tell whether he was in front, in the middle, or behind the center of the army.

Walter was shaken by the efficiency of the Russian scorched earth policy. He recorded that

From Smolensk to Moshaisk the war displayed its horrible work of destruction: all the roads, fields, and woods lay as though sown with people, horses, wagons, burned villages and cities; everything looked like the complete ruin of all that lived.

=== Retreat from Moscow ===
Walter records that after the fall of Moscow and the subsequent retreat, the French commanders became more brutal to the men; he says that even in retreat the commanders would inspect the men's weapons, and men who had rust on their weapons were beaten with clubs "until they were near desperation." Also, food became even harder to find, and several times he had to fight French and German soldiers over scavenged wheat. In the bivouac at Smolensk, the men slaughtered their horses, and fought over the meat. Unable to get even horse meat, Walter turned to blood:

...I took along the pot I carried, stationed myself beside a horse that was being shot, and caught up the blood....I set this blood on the fire, let it coagulate, and ate the lumps without salt.

On 16 November he arrived in Krasny (with Eugène de Beauharnais) and wrote he knew nothing about Ney who was cut off with his rearguard. On 25 November he arrived at Borisov, on the same day as Napoleon. By the end of December he reached the Polish border. On 24 February he arrived in Ellwangen and met his relatives.

== Later life ==
Jakob Walter returned safely to Ludwigsburg and Asperg although he had problems with walking and complained about headaches. He remained there the rest of his life. He married in 1817 and had ten children, of whom five were still living when he wrote a letter to his son Albert in 1856.

In his later years he wrote an account of his experiences, intended for his family. He titled it Denkwurdige Geschichtschreibung über die erlebte Millitäridienstzeit des Verfassers dieses Schreibens ("Memorable History of the Military Service Experienced by the Author of these Letters.") He mailed it to his son Albert, who had emigrated to the United States, in 1856. In 1932, a scholar at the University of Kansas, Frank E. Melvin, acquired the manuscript and authenticated it. Another University of Kansas professor, Otto Springer, translated the work into English, and they published it as A German Conscript with Napoleon.

In 1991, Penguin Books re-issued the Springer translation in the United States and Canada under the title The Diary of a Napoleonic Foot Soldier (Penguin Books USA, New York, NY, ISBN 0-14-016559-2.)
