= Vrasene =

- Village
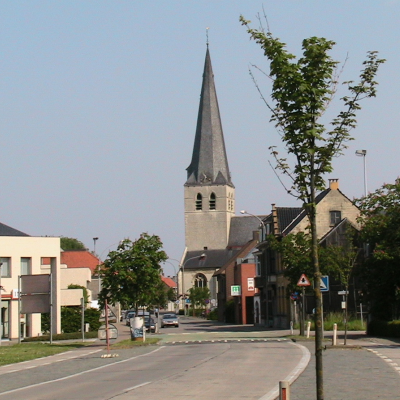
- Street view with Holy Cross Church

- Location in Belgium
- Coordinates: 51.2192°N 4.1947°E
- Country: Belgium
- Region: Flemish Region
- Province: East Flanders
- Municipality: Beveren

Area
  - Total: 14.10 km^{2} (5.44 sq mi)

Population (2021)
  - Total: 4,227
  - Density: 299.8/km^{2} (776.4/sq mi)
- Time zone: CET

Vrasene is a village in the municipality of Beveren in the Belgian province of East Flanders. It is located about 15 kilometres (9.3 mi) west of Antwerp.

== History ==
Vrasene is located on a hill which is a remnant of an old dune stretching from Stekene to Zwijndrecht. The area around Vrasene was never a noble possession or a fief. The name probably means "settlement on the (former river) Verre". In 1136, the monastery of Salegem was founded in Vrasene and the monks started to cultivate the land. A church has been known to exist in Vrasene since 1183. In 1624, the monastery was destroyed during the religious wars. During the 18th century, Vrasene was a centre of clog production.

In 1845, the village of Meerdonk separated from Vrasene and formed its own municipality. During World War I, the polders around the village were inundated to halt the German progress. During the occupation, the village was part of the so-called Etappegebiet, a military area where 188 bunkers were constructed to guard against a British invasion or Dutch attack. In September 1918, the entire male population was held hostage in the church after a local police officer who allegedly collaborated with the Germans was murdered.

Vrasene was an independent municipality until 1977 when it was merged with Beveren as part of the fusion of municipalities in Belgium.

== Buildings ==
The Holy Cross church was first mentioned in 1183. In 1448, the church was redesigned into a three aisled Gothic church. The square tower was added between 1450 and 1455. The church was extended in 1877, and declared a monument in 1942.

== Notable people ==
- Ruben Apers (born 1998), racing cyclist
- Laura Waem (born 1997), artistic gymnast

== Gallery ==
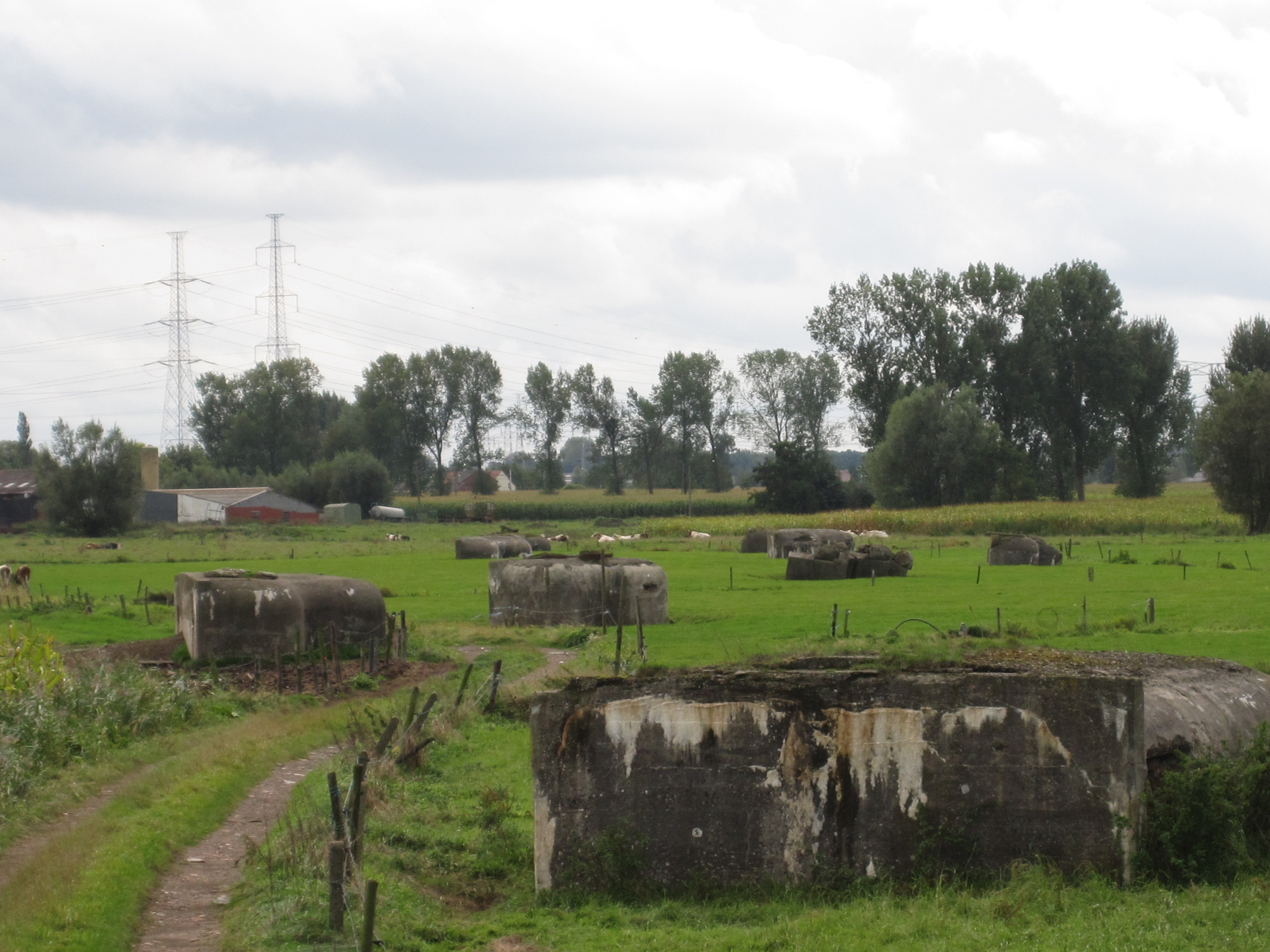
Bunkers in the meadow

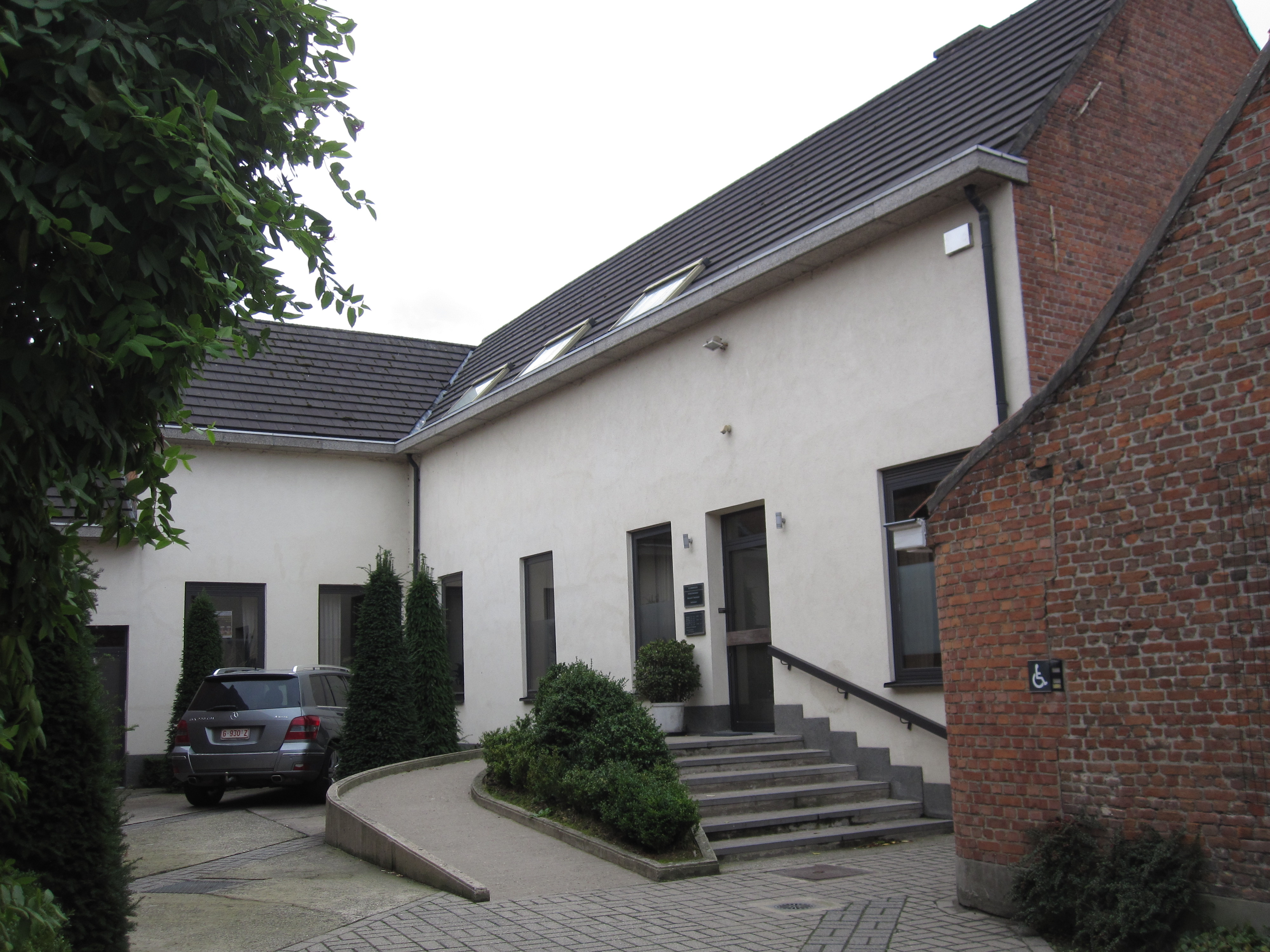
Former brewery. Nowadays a residential house

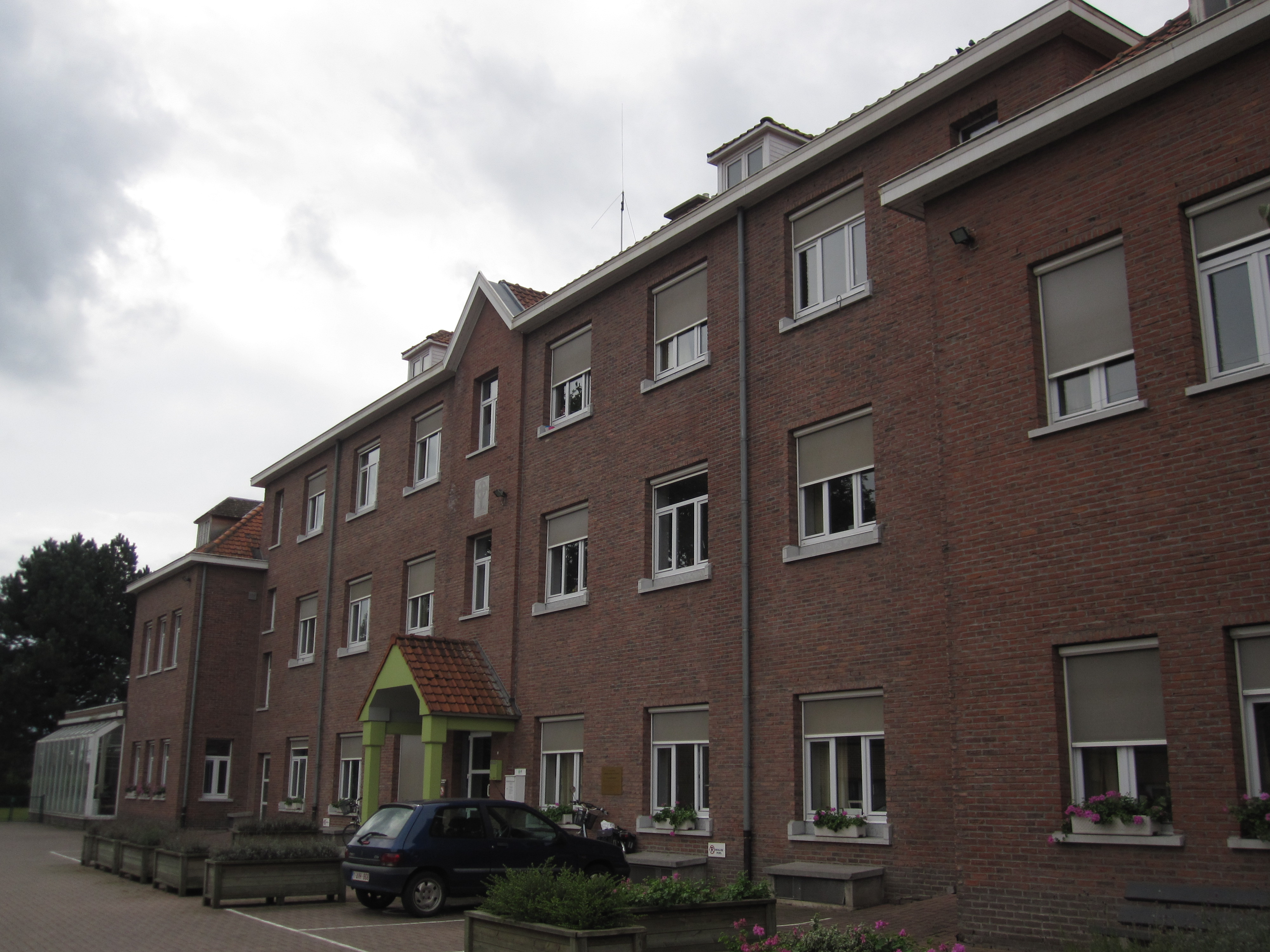
Retirement home
