= Lotto–Groupe Wanty =

Belgian cycling team

Team information
- UCI code: DAV (2007); LDD (2023–2024); LOD (2025–)
- Registered: Belgium
- Founded: 2007; 19 years ago
- Discipline: Road
- Status: UCI Continental (2007, 2023–); Club (2008–2022)
- Bicycles: Ridley

Team name history
- 2007–2008 2009 2010 2011 2012–2014 2015–2022 2023–2024 2025 2026–: Davo; Davo–Lotto–Davitamon; Davo–Lotto; Omega Pharma–Lotto Davo; Lotto–Belisol U23; Lotto–Soudal U23; Lotto–Dstny Development Team; Lotto Development Team; Lotto–Groupe Wanty
Lotto–Groupe Wanty jersey
Jersey

The Lotto–Groupe Wanty is a Belgian UCI Continental road cycling team founded in 2007 that acts as the development program for UCI ProTeam Lotto–Intermarché.

== Team roster ==
As of 14 September 2024.

Rider	Date of birth
Arne Baers (BEL)	27 March 2002 (age 24)
Mauro Cuylits (BEL)	23 May 2005 (age 21)
Milan De Ceuster (BEL)	29 December 2005 (age 20)
Axel De Lie (BEL)	27 April 1999 (age 27)
Steffen De Schuyteneer (BEL)	24 February 2005 (age 21)
Milan Donie (BEL)	3 January 2005 (age 21)
Kamiel Eeman (BEL)	10 August 2005 (age 21)
Joshua Giddings (GBR)	20 July 2003 (age 23)
Matys Grisel (FRA)	14 July 2005 (age 21)

Rider	Date of birth
Robin Orins (BEL)	6 March 2002 (age 24)
Tars Poelvoorde (BEL)	25 November 2005 (age 20)
Liam Van Bylen (BEL)	27 February 2005 (age 21)
Lorenz Van de Wynkele (BEL)	19 August 2001 (age 25)
Viktor Vaneeckhoutte (BEL)	28 December 2005 (age 20)
Thomas Vuerinckx (BEL)	14 November 2005 (age 20)
Jarno Widar (BEL)	13 November 2005 (age 20)
Daniil Yakovlev (UKR)	13 June 2005 (age 21)

== Major results ==
2013
Points classification Circuit des Ardennes International, Tiesj Benoot

Young rider classification, Tiesj Benoot

Stage 1 Le Triptyque des Monts et Châteaux, Jorne Carolus
2014
Overall Ronde de l'Isard, Louis Vervaeke

Young rider classification, Tiesj Benoot

Paris–Arras Tour

Teams classification (Note: The riders in the squad were Amaury Capiot, Maarten Craeghs, Rob Leemans, Daniel McLay, Ruben Pols, and Jef Van Meirhaeghe.)
Stage 3, Daniel McLay

2015
Stage 2 Carpathian Couriers Race, Dries Van Gestel
Points classification Giro della Valle d'Aosta, Laurens De Plus

Stage 1, Laurens De Plus

2016
Overall Ronde de l'Isard, Bjorg Lambrecht

Points classification, Bjorg Lambrecht
Mountains classification, Bjorg Lambrecht
Young rider classification, Bjorg Lambrecht
Teams classification (Note: The riders in the squad were Steff Cras, Steff Hermans, Kevin Inkelaar, Bjorg Lambrecht, Emiel Planckaert, and Harm Vanhoucke.)
Stage 1, Bjorg Lambrecht

Grand Prix des Marbriers, Emiel Planckaert
Piccolo Giro di Lombardia, Harm Vanhoucke
Young rider classification Tour du Loir-et-Cher, Edward Planckaert

Stage 1, Michael Goolaerts

Stage 2 Tour de Savoie Mont-Blanc, Harm Vanhoucke
Stage 3 Peace Race U23, Bjorg Lambrecht
2017
Stage 1 Okolo Jižních Čech, team time trial (Note: The winning riders were Sander De Pestel, Mitch Groot, Laurens Huys, Kevin Inkelaar, Milan Menten, and Thomas Vereecken.)
Stage 2 Ronde van Midden-Nederland, Alfdan De Decker
2018
Young rider classification Okolo Jižních Čech, Stan Dewulf

Stage 1, team time trial (Note: The winning riders were Alex Colman, Sander De Pestel, Stan Dewulf, Laurens Huys, Arne Marit, and Aaron Van Poucke.)

2019
Mountains classification Circuit des Ardennes International, Kobe Goossens

Teams classification (Note: The riders in the squad were Kobe Goossens, Laurens Huys, Julian Mertens, Maxim Van Gils, Thomas Vereecken, and Viktor Verschaeve.)

2020
Overall Ronde de l'Isard, Xandres Vervloesem

Points classification, Henri Vandenabeele
Mountains classification, Henri Vandenabeele
Young rider classification, Xandres Vervloesem
Teams classification (Note: The riders in the squad were Sébastien Grignard, Steven Pattyn, Harry Sweeny, Maxim Van Gils, Henri Vandenabeele, and Xandres Vervloesem.)
Stage 2a, Henri Vandenabeele

Piccolo Giro di Lombardia, Harry Sweeny
Young rider classification Tour de Savoie Mont-Blanc, Maxim Van Gils

Stage 2, Viktor Verschaeve

Young rider classification Course de Solidarność et des Champions Olympiques, Ruben Apers

Teams classification (Note: The riders in the squad were Ruben Apers, Arne Marit, Steven Pattyn, Jarne Van de Paar, Lennert van Eetvelt, and Ward Vanhoof.)

Young rider classification Giro della Regione Friuli Venezia Giulia, Henri Vandenabeele
Stage 1 Tour Bitwa Warszawska 1920, Arne Marit
2021
Stages 2 & 5 Tour Alsace, Arnaud De Lie
Overall Okolo Jižních Čech, Arnaud De Lie

Stage 1, Arnaud De Lie

Stage 3 Circuit des Ardennes, Arnaud De Lie
2022
Trofeo Città di Meldola, Luca Van Boven
Coppa Zappi, Vincent Van Hemelen
Stage 6 Giro d'Italia Giovani Under 23, Lennert Van Eetvelt
Stage 1, team time trial, (Note: The winning riders were Ramses Debruyne, Gianluca Pollefliet, and Alec Segaert.) Tour Alsace
Piccolo Giro di Lombardia, Alec Segaert
Chrono des Nations U23, Alec Segaert
2023
Stage 2 Tour du Loir-et-Cher, Jarne Van de Paar
2025
Liège–Bastogne–Liège U23, Jarno Widar
2026
1st Le Tour des 100 Communes, Matys Grisel
