= Lorenz Van de Wynkele =

Belgian cyclist (born 2001)

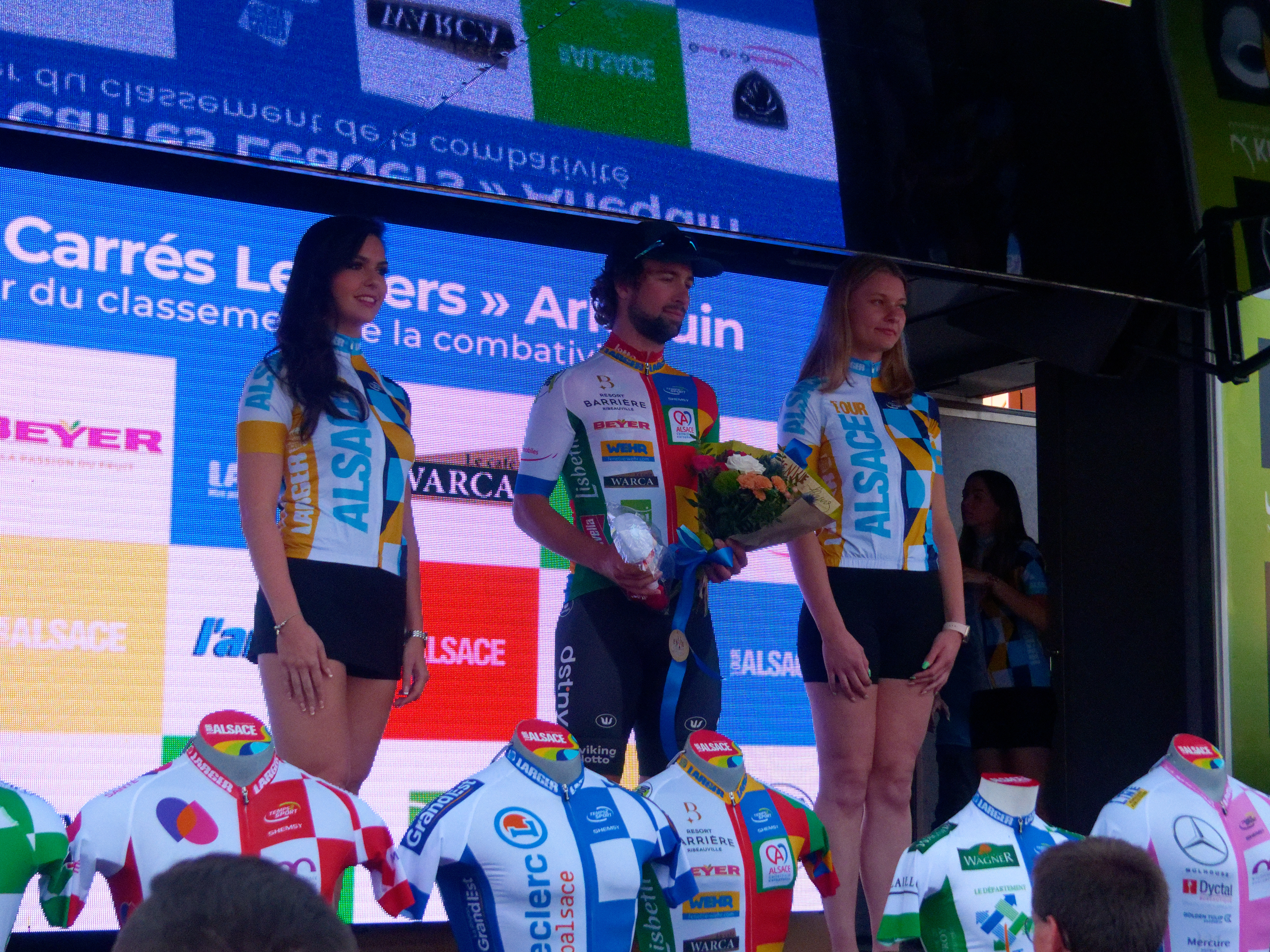
- Van de Wynkele in 2023

Personal information
- Born: 19 August 2001 (age 25) De Pinte, Belgium
- Height: 1.82 m (6 ft 0 in)
- Weight: 75 kg (165 lb)

Cycling career
- Sport: Cycling
- Current team: Lotto–Groupe Wanty
- Discipline: Road
- Role: Rider

Amateur teams
- 2019: Van Moer Logistics Cycling Team
- 2020: Vetrapo CT
- 2021: Home Solution–Soenens

Professional teams
- 2022: Elevate p/b Home Solution–Soenens
- 2023–2024: Lotto–Dstny Development Team
- 2025: Lotto
- 2026–: Lotto–Groupe Wanty

Lorenz Van de Wynkele (born 19 August 2001) is a Belgian cyclist, who currently rides for UCI Continental team Lotto–Groupe Wanty.

== Major results ==
2021
4th Overall Tour du Pays de Montbéliard
2022
3rd Coppa Zappi
2023
6th Overall Tour de Namur
9th Overall Triptyque Ardennais
10th Brussel-Opwijk
2024
9th Overall Tour du Loir-et-Cher

1st Stage 1
