= Edward Planckaert =

Belgian bicycle rider

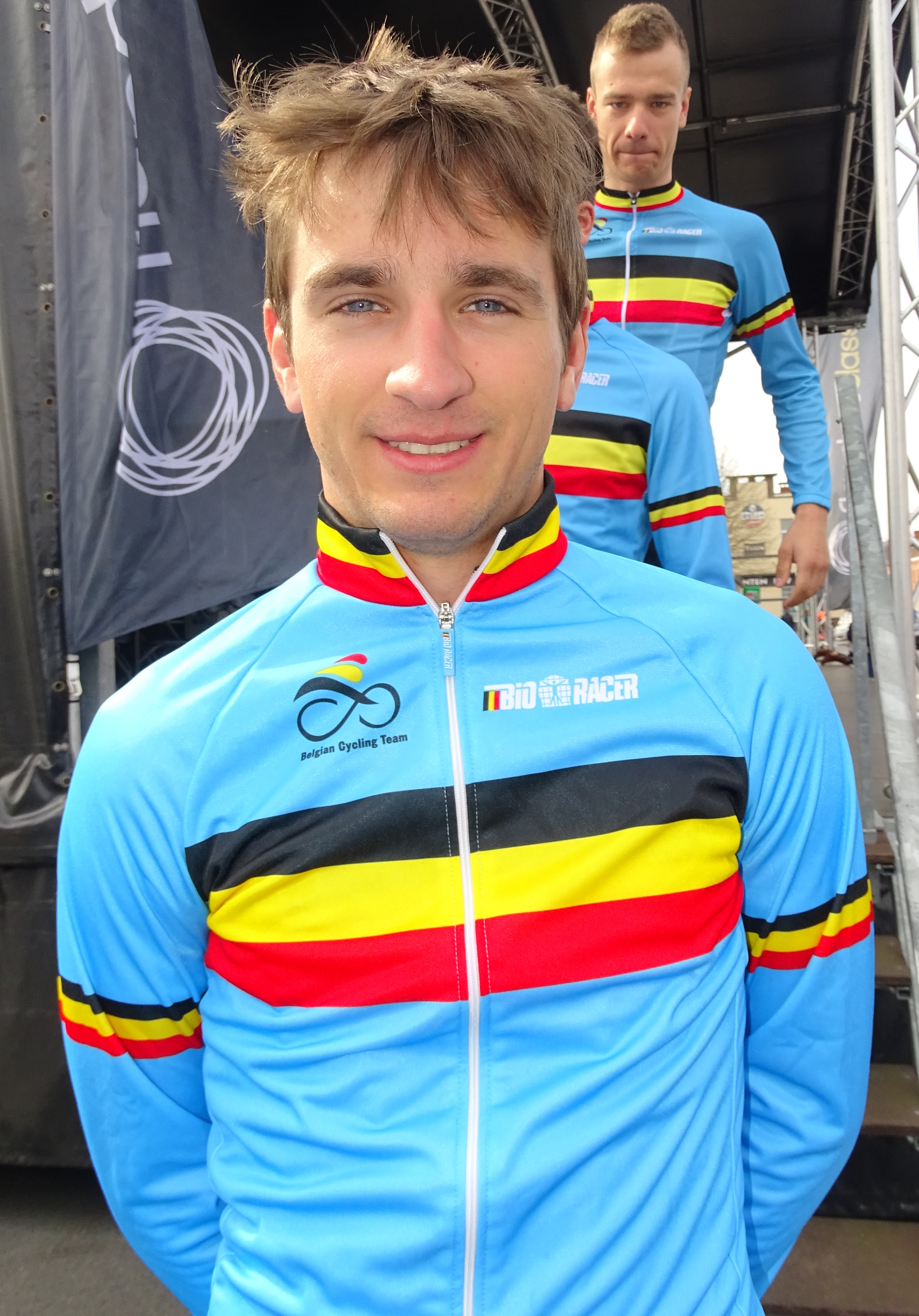
- Planckaert in 2016.

Personal information
- Full name: Edward Planckaert
- Born: 1 February 1995 (age 31) Kortrijk, Belgium

Cycling career
- Sport: Cycling
- Current team: Alpecin–Premier Tech
- Discipline: Road
- Role: Rider

Amateur teams
- 2012: DJ–Matic Kortrijk
- 2013: Avia–Crabbé
- 2014: EFC–Omega Pharma–Quick-Step
- 2015: BCV Works–Soenens
- 2016: Lotto–Soudal U23

Professional teams
- 2017–2020: Sport Vlaanderen–Baloise
- 2021–: Alpecin–Fenix

Edward Planckaert (born 1 February 1995 in Kortrijk) is a Belgian cyclist, who currently rides for UCI WorldTeam Alpecin–Premier Tech. His brothers Baptiste Planckaert and Emiel Planckaert are also cyclists.

== Major results ==
2016
4th Overall Tour du Loir-et-Cher

1st Young rider classification

5th Paris–Roubaix Espoirs
5th Dwars door de Vlaamse Ardennen
6th Overall Olympia's Tour
6th Ster van Zwolle
2017
4th Classic Loire Atlantique
4th Grote Prijs Jean-Pierre Monseré
10th Grote Prijs Marcel Kint
2018
1st Sprints classification, Tour de Wallonie
3rd Dwars door de Vlaamse Ardennen
4th Grote Prijs Marcel Kint
9th Clásica de Almería
10th Fyen Rundt
2019
1st Mountains classification, Étoile de Bessèges
7th Clásica de Almería
7th Ronde van Drenthe
9th Omloop Mandel-Leie-Schelde
2020
10th Brussels Cycling Classic
2021 (1 pro win)
1st Stage 1 Vuelta a Burgos
2023
1st Sprints classification, UAE Tour
9th Münsterland Giro

=== Grand Tour general classification results timeline ===
Grand Tour	2021	2022	2023	2024	2025	2026
Giro d'Italia	—	—	—	95	102	DNF
Tour de France	—	111	—	—	—	
Vuelta a España	122	—	136	116	119	

Legend
—	Did not compete
DNF	Did not finish
