= Xandres Vervloesem =

Belgian cyclist

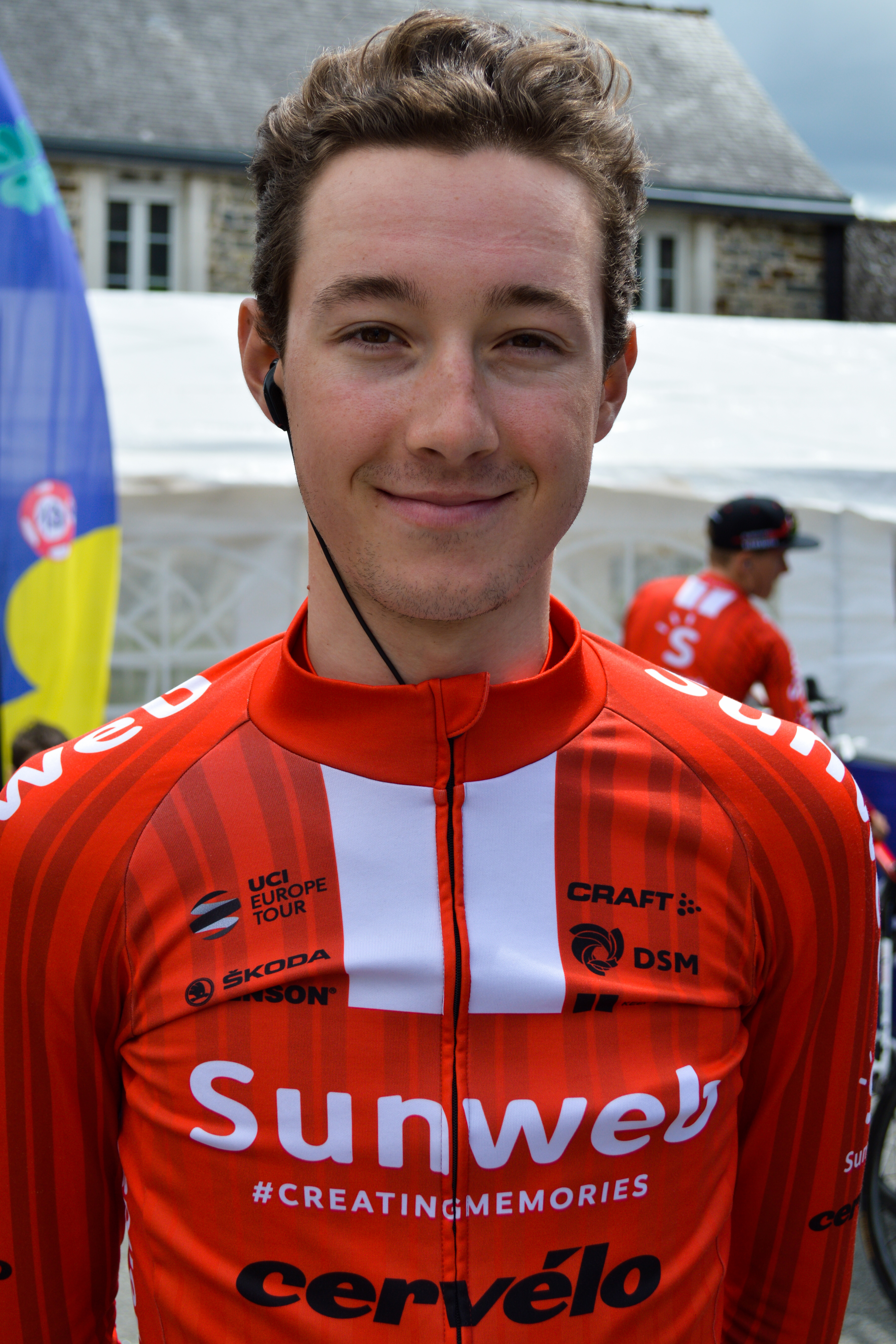
- Xandres Vervloesem in 2019

Personal information
- Born: 13 May 2000 (age 26) Massenhoven, Belgium
- Height: 1.84 m (6 ft 0 in)
- Weight: 65 kg (143 lb)

Cycling career
- Sport: Cycling
- Current team: Retired
- Discipline: Road
- Role: Rider

Amateur teams
- 2017: SPE-Douterloigne
- 2018: Van Moer Logistics
- 2019: Development Team Sunweb
- 2020: Lotto–Soudal U23

Professional team
- 2021–2022: Lotto–Soudal

Xandres Vervloesem (born 13 May 2000) is a Belgian former cyclist, who competed as a professional for UCI WorldTeam Lotto–Soudal from 2021 to 2022.

== Major results ==
2017
2nd Overall Ain Bugey Valromey Tour

1st Young rider classification
1st Stage 5

3rd Overall Aubel–Thimister–La Gleize

1st Young rider classification
1st Mountains classification
1st Stage 3

8th Overall Tour du Pays de Vaud
2018
2nd E3 Harelbeke Junioren
3rd Overall GP Général Patton
4th Overall Giro della Lunigiana
4th Overall Oberösterreich Juniorenrundfahrt

1st Mountains classification

5th Gent–Wevelgem Juniors
5th Nokere Koerse voor Juniores
9th Road race, UEC European Junior Road Championships
9th Trofeo Emilio Paganessi
2020
1st Overall Ronde de l'Isard

1st Young rider classification
