= Sébastien Grignard =

Belgian cyclist

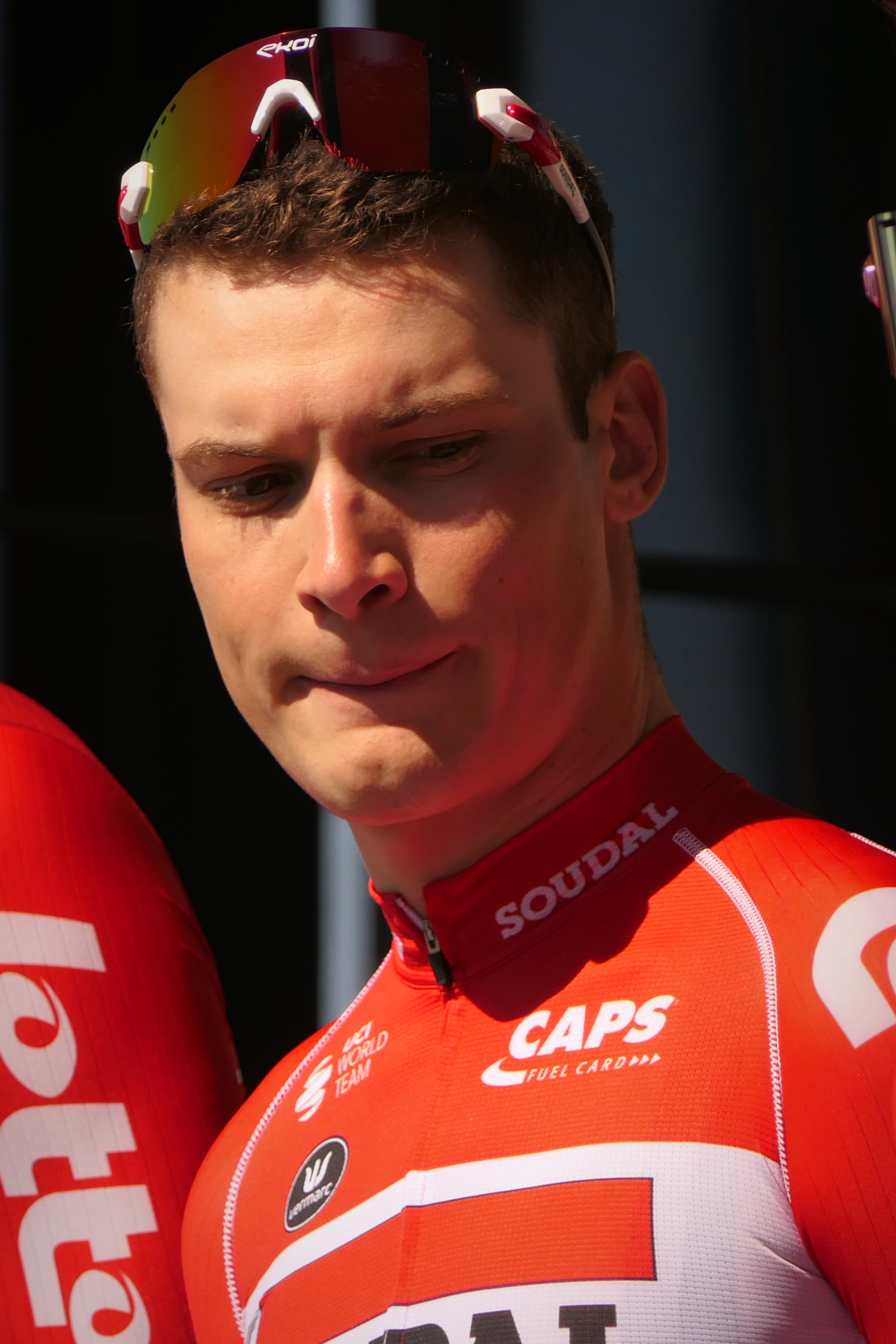
- Grignard at the 2022 Paris–Roubaix

Personal information
- Born: 29 April 1999 (age 27) Mons, Belgium
- Height: 1.79 m (5 ft 10 in)
- Weight: 68 kg (150 lb)

Cycling career
- Sport: Cycling
- Current team: Lotto–Intermarché
- Discipline: Road
- Role: Rider
- Rider type: Time trialist

Amateur team
- 2018–2020: Lotto–Soudal U23

Professional team
- 2021–: Lotto–Soudal

Sébastien Grignard (born 29 April 1999) is a Belgian professional racing cyclist, who currently rides for UCI WorldTeam Lotto–Intermarché. He was promoted from the team's under-23 development squad in 2021.

== Major results ==
2016
2nd Chrono des Nations
5th Time trial, National Junior Road Championships
2017
National Junior Road Championships

1st Road race
1st Time trial

1st Chrono des Nations Juniors
2nd La Philippe Gilbert Juniors
3rd Time trial, UEC European Junior Road Championships
4th Paris–Roubaix Juniors
4th Nokere Koerse voor Juniores
5th La Bernaudeau Junior
2019
3rd Road race, National Under-23 Road Championships

=== Grand Tour general classification results timeline ===
Grand Tour	2023	2024	2025
Giro d'Italia	—	—	—
Tour de France	—	129	144
Vuelta a España	118	—	—

Legend
—	Did not compete
DNF	Did not finish
