= Ronde de l'Isard =

French multi-day road cycling race

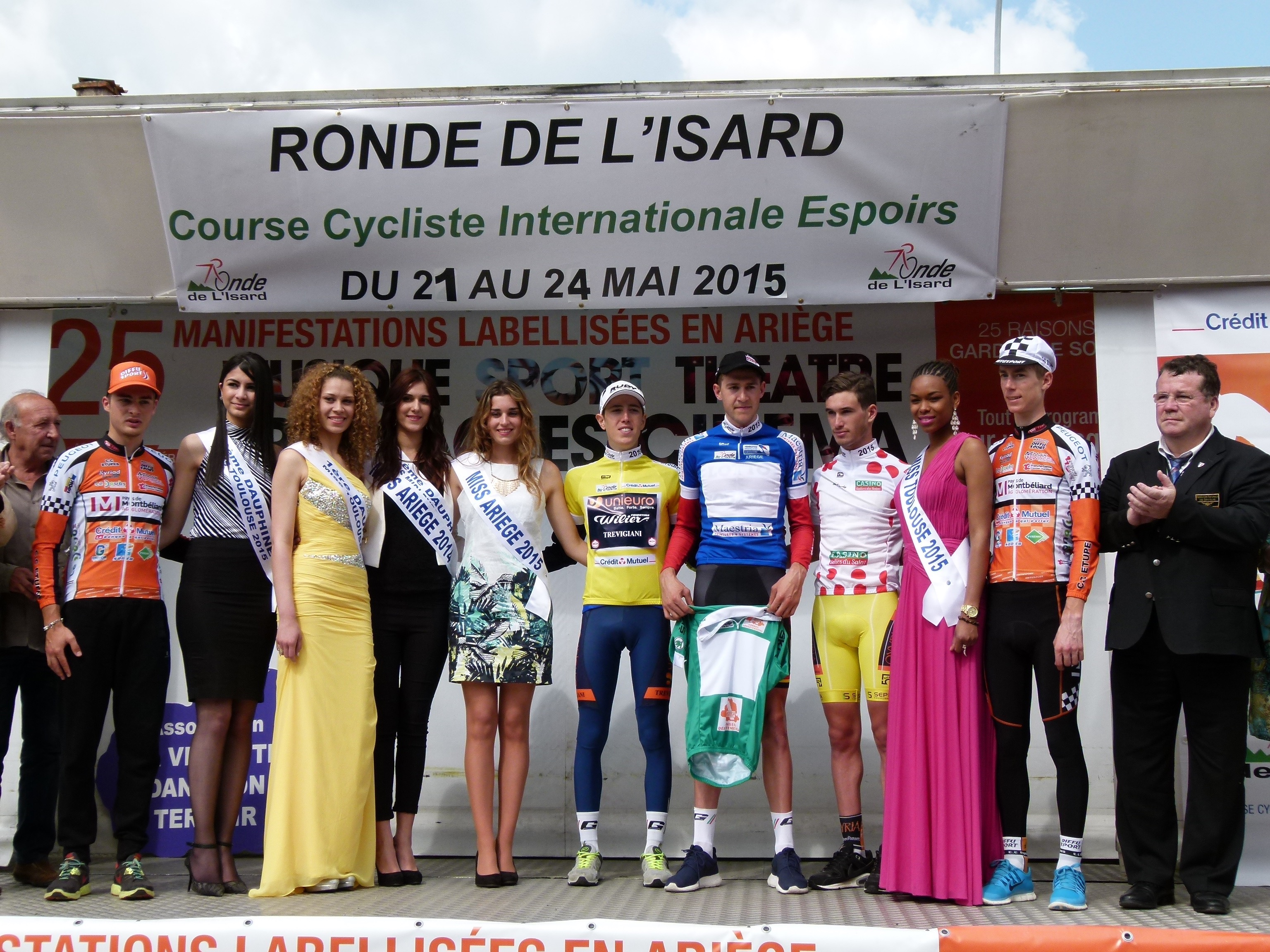
- The podium for the 2015 edition

Race details
- Date: May
- Region: Midi-Pyrénées
- Discipline: Road race
- Competition: UCI Europe Tour
- Type: Stage race
- Web site: www.ronde-isard.fr

History
- First edition: 1977
- Editions: 48 (as of 2026)
- First winner: André Lassoureille (FRA)
- Most recent: Niels Driesen (BEL)

The Ronde de l'Isard is a road bicycle race held annually in France. It is organized as a 2.2U event on the UCI Europe Tour.

== Winners ==
Year	Country	Rider	Team
1977	France	André Lassoureille	
1978	France	Daniel Salles	
1979	France	Christian Bonnand	
1980	France	Jean-Jacques Szkolnijk	
1981	France	Bernard Pineau	
1982	Netherlands	Herman Winkel	
1983	Switzerland	Daniel Wyder	
1984	France	Joël Versolato	
1985	No race		
1986	Colombia	Julio César Cadena	
1987	France	Dominique Arnould	
1988	Colombia	Mario Martínez	
1989	Colombia	Luis Felipe Moreno	
1990	Czechoslovakia	Jiří Toman	
1991	Germany	Mario Hernig	
1992	France	Laurent Roux	US Montauban 82
1993	Germany	Uwe Peschel	
1994	France	Xavier Jan	
1995	Russia	Igor Pavlov	
1996	France	Vincent Cali	CC Étupes
1997	France	Denis Leproux	
1998	Russia	Denis Menchov	
1999	Great Britain	Jamie Burrow	
2000	Italy	Graziano Gasparre	UC Bergamasca 1902
2001	France	Christophe Le Mével	Crédit Agricole
2002	Germany	Markus Fothen	Team TEAG Köstritzer
2003	United States	Pat McCarty	
2004	Ireland	Philip Deignan	Vélo-Club La Pomme Marseille
2005	Spain	Eduardo Gonzalo	FC Barcelona
2006	Lithuania	Ignatas Konovalovas	Vélo-Club La Pomme Marseille
2007	United States	John Devine	Discovery Channel
2008	France	Guillaume Bonnafond	Chambéry Cyclisme Formation
2009	France	Alexandre Geniez	Vélo-Club La Pomme Marseille
2010	Belgium	Yannick Eijssen	Team PWS Eyssen-Kempen
2011	France	Kenny Elissonde	CC Étupes
2012	France	Pierre-Henri Lecuisinier	Vendée U
2013	Colombia	Juan Ernesto Chamorro	4-72 Colombia
2014	Belgium	Louis Vervaeke	Lotto-Belisol U23
2015	Italy	Simone Petilli	Unieuro–Wilier
2016	Belgium	Bjorg Lambrecht	Lotto-Soudal U23
2017	Russia	Pavel Sivakov	BMC Development Team
2018	Great Britain	Stephen Williams	SEG Racing Academy
2019	Italy	Andrea Bagioli	Team Colpack
2020	Belgium	Xandres Vervloesem	Lotto-Soudal U23
2021	Netherlands	Gijs Leemreize	Team Jumbo–Visma
2022	Norway	Johannes Staune-Mittet	Jumbo–Visma Development Team
2023	No race		
2024	Netherlands	Darren van Bekkum	Visma–Lease a Bike Development
2025	Belgium	Jarno Widar	Lotto Development Team
2026	Belgium	Niels Driesen	Lotto–Groupe Wanty
