= Aubel–Thimister–Stavelot =

Race details
- Date: July/August
- Region: Belgium
- Discipline: Road bicycle racing
- Type: Stage race
- Organiser: La société Flèche ardennaise
- Web site: fleche-ardennaise.be

History
- First edition: 1955
- Editions: 59 (as of 2026)
- First winner: Francesco Miele (ITA)
- Most recent: Soen Le Pann (FRA)

Aubel–Thimister–Stavelot is a junior (ages 17–18) multi-day cycling race held annually in Belgium. It was part of the UCI Junior World Cup from 2003 to 2007. From 1955 to 2013, the race was named Liège-La Gleize, before being changed to Aubel–Thimister–La Gleize in 2014 and then to Aubel–Thimister–Stavelot in 2018.

== Winners ==
Year	Winner	Second	Third
Liège–La Gleize
1955	(Italy) Francesco Miele		
1956	(Belgium) Maurice Nelissen		
1957	(Belgium) Yves Gehault		
1958	(Belgium) Georges Van Coningsloo		
1959	(Belgium) Guy Honhon		
1960	(Belgium) Jean Christiaens		
1961	(Belgium) Romain Robben		
1962	(Belgium) Eddy Merckx		
1963	(Belgium) Johnny Pieters		
1964	(Belgium) Marcel Verjans		
1965	(Belgium) Ricardo Civino		
1966	(Belgium) Jacques Maen		
1967	(Belgium) Roger Lochtenberg		
1968	(Italy) Serge Del Amore		
1969	(Belgium) Aldo Fechi		
1970–1981	Not held		
1982	(Luxembourg) Henri Schnadt		
1983	(Belgium) Ronny Vlassaks		
1984	(Belgium) Patrick Boogaerts		
1985	(Netherlands) H. Suykerbuyk		
1986	(Netherlands) Hans Bogers		
1987	(Germany) Stephan Schruff		
1988	(Germany) Alexander Dorper		
1989	(Belgium) Karl Pauwels		
1990	(Netherlands) Niels van der Steen		
1991	(Belgium) Anthon Vermaerke		
1992	(Belgium) Frank Vandenbroucke		
1993	(Netherlands) Johan Bruinsma		
1994	(Netherlands) Maarten Nijland		
1995	(Belgium) Leif Hoste		
1996	(Belgium) Kim Van Bouwel		
1997	(Netherlands) Roel Egelmeers		
1998	(Belgium) Jurgen Van Goolen		
1999	(Belgium) Preben Van Hecke		
2000	(Belgium) Samuel Denis		
2001	(Belgium) Stijn Ennekens	(Belgium) Johan Sermon	(Belgium) Wouter Weylandt
2002	(Netherlands) Thomas Dekker	(Netherlands) Egon van Kessel	(Russia) Ilya Chernetsky
2003	(Slovenia) Grega Bole	(Belgium) Jürgen Roelandts	(Netherlands) Lars Boom
2004	(Slovenia) Simon Špilak	(Netherlands) Cornelis van Ooijen	(Belgium) Nikolas Maes
2005	(Denmark) Troels Vinther	(Denmark) André Steensen	(Estonia) Tanel Kangert
2006	(Denmark) Niki Østergaard	(Belgium) Sven Vandousselaere	(France) Tony Gallopin
2007	(Belgium) Yannick Eijssen	(Lithuania) Edgaras Kovaliovas	(Belgium) Joeri Adams
2008	(Netherlands) Wilco Kelderman	(Netherlands) Mats Boeve	(Belgium) Steve Bekaert
2009	(Belgium) Zico Waeytens	(United States) Ian Boswell	(France) Romain Guillemois
2010	(Australia) Samuel Spokes	(Netherlands) Daan Olivier	(Netherlands) Dylan van Baarle
2011	(Denmark) Alexander Kamp	(Denmark) Frederik Plesner	(France) Guillaume Martin
2012	(Russia) Ildar Arslanov	(France) Franck Bonnamour	(Denmark) Mads Pedersen
2013	(France) David Rivière	(Denmark) Jonas Gregaard	(Denmark) Christoffer Lisson
Aubel–Thimister–La Gleize
2014	(France) David Gaudu	(Netherlands) Pascal Eenkhoorn	(Netherlands) Sjoerd Bax
2015	(Italy) Ottavio Dotti	(Denmark) Anthon Charmig	(Belgium) Bjorg Lambrecht
2016	(Denmark) Mikkel Bjerg	(Belgium) Gilles Borra	(Belgium) Lothar Verhulst
2017	(United Kingdom) Mark Donovan	(United Kingdom) Thomas Pidcock	(Belgium) Xandres Vervloesem
Aubel–Thimister–Stavelot
2018	(Belgium) Remco Evenepoel	(Denmark) Frederik Thomsen	(Eritrea) Biniam Girmay
2019	(United States) Jared Scott	(Belgium) Ramses Debruyne	(Belgium) Lennert Van Eetvelt
2020	Cancelled		
2021	(Belgium) Cian Uijtdebroeks	(Norway) Per Strand Hagenes	(Germany) Emil Herzog
2022	(Russia) Roman Ermakov	(Netherlands) Max van der Meulen	(United States) Jesse Maris
2023	(Belgium) Cédric Keppens	(Belgium) Niels Driesen	(Belgium) Mauro Cuylits
2024	(Italy) Lorenzo Finn	(Finland) Kasper Borremans	(United Kingdom) Sebastian Grindley
2025	(Netherlands) Gijs Schoonvelde	(United States) Braden Reitz	(Belgium) Mats Vanden Eynde
2026	(France) Soen Le Pann	(Belgium) Seff Van Kerckhove	(Germany) Karl Herzog
