= Liège–Bastogne–Liège U23 =

Belgian one-day road cycling race

U23 Liège–Bastogne–Liège
- Poster to the 2025 edition

Race details
- Date: Late-April
- English name: Liège–Bastogne–Liège
- Discipline: Road
- Competition: UCI Europe Tour
- Type: Single-day

History
- First edition: 1986
- Editions: 40 (as of 2026)
- First winner: Frans Maassen (NED)
- Most wins: Raivis Belohvoščiks (LAT); Michael Valgren (DEN) (2 wins)
- Most recent: Daan Dijkman (NED)

The U23 Liège–Bastogne–Liège or Liège–Bastogne–Liège Espoirs is a cycling race in Belgium, held eight days before the cycling classic, the Liège–Bastogne–Liège. This amateur version of the race began in 1986, and since 2005, it has been open to professionals under the age of 23.

== Winners ==
Year	Country	Rider	Team
1986	Netherlands	Frans Maassen	
1987	Netherlands	Stephan Rakers	
1988	Netherlands	Marcel Derix	
1989	Belgium	Philippe Mathy	
1990	Belgium	Sandro Bottelberghe	
1991	Belgium	Pierre Herinne	
1992	France	Laurent Eudeline	
1993	Belgium	Marc Janssens	
1994	France	Franck Laurance	
1995	Latvia	Raivis Belohvosciks	
1996	Latvia	Raivis Belohvosciks	
1997	Luxembourg	Christian Poos	
1998	France	Frédéric Drillaud	
1999	France	Philippe Koehler	C.C. Etupes
2000	Belgium	Jurgen Van Goolen	Saeco-Mapei
2001	Ukraine	Ruslan Gryschenko	Zoccorinese-Vellutex
2002	France	Christophe Kern	Vendée U-Pays de la Loire
2003	Belgium	Johan Van Summeren	Quick Step-Latexco
2004	Belarus	Branislau Samoilau	US Palazzago Vellutex
2005	Denmark	Martin Pedersen	Team GLS
2006	Netherlands	Kai Reus	Rabobank Continental Team
2007	Slovenia	Grega Bole	Slovenia (national team)
2008	Belgium	Jan Bakelants	Team Beveren 2000
2009	Denmark	Rasmus Guldhammer	Team Capinordic
2010	Lithuania	Ramunas Navardauskas	VC La Pomme Marseille
2011	Belgium	Tosh van der Sande	Omega Pharma–Lotto–Davo
2012	Denmark	Michael Valgren	Glud & Marstrand–LRØ
2013	Denmark	Michael Valgren	Team Cult Energy
2014	France	Anthony Turgis	CC Nogent-sur-Oise
2015	France	Guillaume Martin	CC Étupes
2016	United States	Logan Owen	Axeon–Hagens Berman
2017	Belgium	Bjorg Lambrecht	Lotto–Soudal U23
2018	Portugal	João Almeida	Hagens Berman Axeon
2019	United States	Kevin Vermaerke	Hagens Berman Axeon
2020	No race due to the COVID-19 pandemic		
2021	Great Britain	Leo Hayter	Development Team DSM
2022	France	Romain Grégoire	Équipe Continentale Groupama–FDJ
2023	Italy	Francesco Busatto	Circus–ReUz–Technord
2024	Great Britain	Joseph Blackmore	Israel Premier Tech Academy
2025	Belgium	Jarno Widar	Lotto Development Team
2026	Netherlands	Daan Dijkman	UAE Team Emirates Gen Z
