= List of career achievements by Alejandro Valverde =

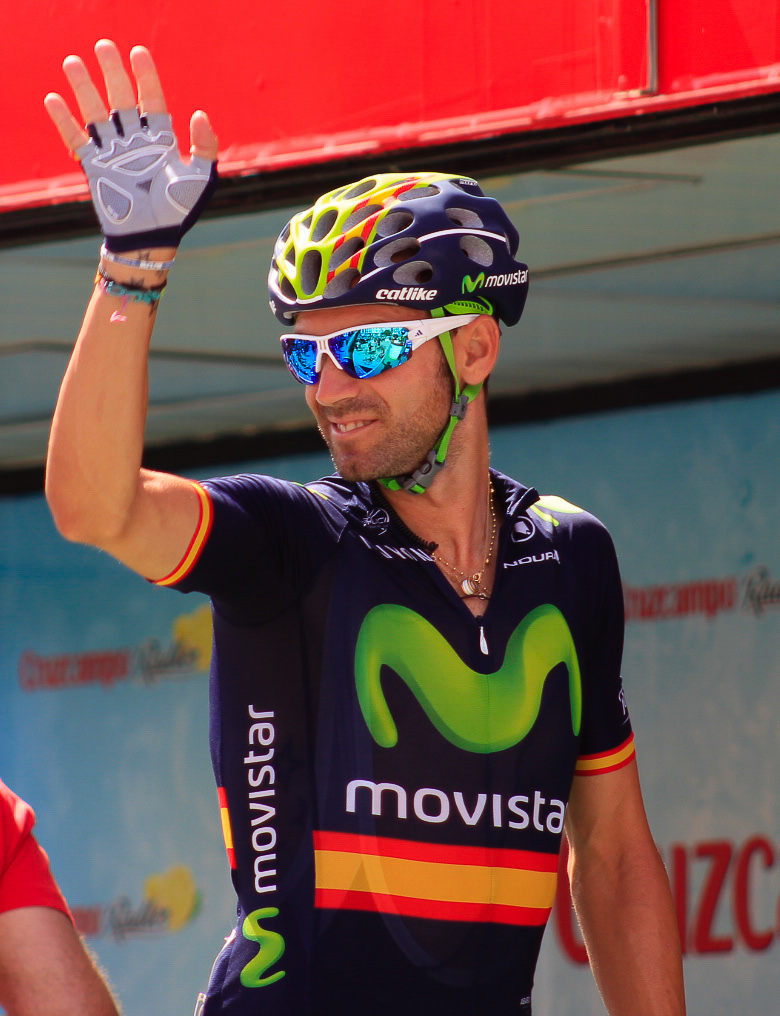
Valverde at the 2015 Vuelta a España

This is a list of career achievements by Alejandro Valverde, a Spanish professional racing cyclist who raced professionally between 2002 and 2010 and between 2012 and 2022. Valverde is noted as a prolific winner of one-day races and stage races.

Valverde is a four-time National Champion (three road titles, one time trial title) and is also a Grand Tour victor, winning the 2009 Vuelta a España. He won a record seven medals in the men's road race at the UCI Road World Championships, winning the rainbow jersey in 2018.

Valverde also holds a number of records, notably the record for number of victories at La Flèche Wallonne, with five and the number of overall victories at the Vuelta a Andalucía with five. He achieved 133 victories as a professional rider, including 17 Grand Tour stage wins.

== Major results ==
=== Gravel ===
2023
UCI World Series

1st Berja
1st Hutchinson Ranxo

4th UCI World Championships
2024
UCI World Series

1st Berja

2nd National Championships
2025
UCI World Series

1st Castellón

=== Road ===
1997
2nd Time trial, National Junior Championships
1998
2nd Time trial, National Junior Championships
2001
1st Road race, National Under-23 Championships
3rd Road race, Mediterranean Games
2002
7th Circuito de Getxo
8th Clásica de Almería
9th Overall Clásica Internacional de Alcobendas
2003 (8 pro wins)
1st Klasika Primavera
1st Prueba Villafranca de Ordizia
1st Stage 3 Vuelta a Aragón
2nd Road race, UCI World Championships
3rd Overall Vuelta a España

1st Combination classification
1st Stages 9 & 15
Held after Stage 20

3rd Overall Vuelta a Andalucía
3rd Overall Troféu Joaquim Agostinho

1st Stages 4a & 5

3rd Trofeo Mallorca
3rd Trofeo Luis Puig
5th Overall Tour of the Basque Country

1st Points classification
1st Stage 3

5th Trofeo Calvia
8th Trofeo Cala Bona-Cala Rajada
8th Trofeo Manacor-Porto Cristo
2004 (15)
1st Overall Vuelta a Burgos

1st Points classification
1st Mountains classification
1st Stages 1, 2 & 3

1st Overall Volta a la Comunitat Valenciana

1st Stages 2 & 3

1st Overall Vuelta a Murcia
1st Trofeo Cala Millor
1st Klasika Primavera
2nd Road race, National Championships
2nd Trofeo Luis Puig
4th Overall Vuelta a España

1st Stage 3

4th Overall Vuelta a Castilla y León

1st Points classification
1st Stages 3, 4 & 5

4th Trofeo Calvia
6th Road race, UCI World Championships
6th Overall Tour of the Basque Country

1st Points classification
1st Stage 1

10th GP Miguel Induráin
2005 (6)
1st Trofeo Manacor
1st Trofeo Soller
1st Stage 10 Tour de France
Tour of the Basque Country

1st Stages 3 & 4

2nd Road race, UCI World Championships
2nd Overall Paris–Nice

1st Young rider classification
1st Stage 7

2nd GP Miguel Induráin
4th Trofeo Calvia
10th Trofeo Alcudia
10th Clásica a los Puertos de Guadarrama
2006 (6)
1st UCI ProTour
1st La Flèche Wallonne
1st Liège–Bastogne–Liège
2nd Overall Vuelta a España

1st Stage 7

2nd Overall Tour of the Basque Country

1st Points classification
1st Stage 1

3rd Road race, UCI World Championships
3rd Overall Tour de Romandie

1st Points classification
1st Stage 4

4th Trofeo Sóller
7th Overall Critérium du Dauphiné Libéré
7th Overall Vuelta a Murcia

1st Stage 2

7th Clásica de Almería
8th Clásica de San Sebastián
2007 (5)
1st Overall Vuelta a Murcia

1st Stage 4 (ITT)

1st Overall Volta a la Comunitat Valenciana
2nd Road race, National Championships
2nd Overall Vuelta a Burgos

1st Stage 4 (ITT)

2nd Liège–Bastogne–Liège
2nd La Flèche Wallonne
2nd Klasika Primavera
2nd Clásica a los Puertos de Guadarrama
3rd Overall Critérium International

1st Points classification

3rd Clásica de San Sebastián
3rd GP Miguel Induráin
5th Overall Tour of the Basque Country
6th Overall Tour de France
6th Amstel Gold Race
8th Overall Clásica Internacional de Alcobendas

1st Stage 3 (ITT)

2008 (12)
1st UCI ProTour
1st Road race, National Championships
1st Overall Critérium du Dauphiné Libéré

1st Points classification
1st Stages 1 & 3 (ITT)

1st Overall Vuelta a Murcia

1st Stage 4 (ITT)

1st Liège–Bastogne–Liège
1st Clásica de San Sebastián
1st Paris–Camembert
2nd Klasika Primavera
3rd Trofeo Calvia
3rd Amstel Gold Race
5th Overall Vuelta a España

1st Stage 2

7th Overall Critérium International
8th Overall Tour de France

1st Stages 1 & 6
Held after Stages 1–2
Held after Stage 1

2009 (8)
1st Overall Vuelta a España

1st Combination classification

1st Overall Volta a Catalunya

1st Stage 3

1st Overall Critérium du Dauphiné Libéré
1st Overall Vuelta a Burgos
1st Klasika Primavera
2nd UCI World Ranking
2nd Overall Vuelta a la Comunidad de Madrid
3rd Road race, National Championships
4th Overall Tour de Romandie
7th La Flèche Wallonne
9th Road race, UCI World Championships
9th Overall Vuelta a Castilla y León

1st Points classification
1st Mountains classification
1st Combination classification
1st Stages 3 & 5

Voided results from 1 January 2010 to 31 December 2011.

2010

1st Overall Tour de Romandie

1st Stage 5

1st Overall Tour Méditerranéen
2nd Overall Tour of the Basque Country

1st Points classification
1st Stages 1 & 2

2nd Overall Paris–Nice
2nd GP Miguel Induráin
3rd Liège–Bastogne–Liège
8th La Flèche Wallonne

2012 (7)
1st Overall Vuelta a Andalucía

1st Points classification
1st Stage 2

1st Stage 17 Tour de France
2nd Overall Vuelta a España

1st Points classification
1st Combination classification
1st Stages 1 (TTT), 3 & 8

2nd Overall Tour Down Under

1st Stage 5

2nd Klasika Primavera
3rd Road race, UCI World Championships
3rd Overall Paris–Nice

1st Stage 3

5th UCI World Tour
9th Overall Tour de Suisse
2013 (4)
1st Overall Vuelta a Andalucía

1st Points classification
1st Prologue & Stage 3

1st Trofeo Serra de Tramuntana
2nd Giro di Lombardia
2nd Amstel Gold Race
2nd Clásica de San Sebastián
3rd Road race, UCI World Championships
3rd Overall Vuelta a España

1st Points classification

3rd UCI World Tour
3rd Liège–Bastogne–Liège
3rd Vuelta a Murcia
4th GP Miguel Induráin
5th Time trial, National Championships
6th Milano–Torino
7th Overall Critérium du Dauphiné
7th La Flèche Wallonne
8th Overall Tour de France
9th Overall Tour de Romandie
2014 (11)
1st UCI World Tour
National Championships

1st Time trial
2nd Road race

1st Overall Vuelta a Andalucía

1st Points classification
1st Combination classification
1st Prologue, Stages 1 & 2

1st Vuelta a Murcia
1st Roma Maxima
1st GP Miguel Induráin
1st La Flèche Wallonne
1st Clásica de San Sebastián
2nd Overall Route du Sud
2nd Liège–Bastogne–Liège
2nd Giro di Lombardia
3rd Road race, UCI World Championships
3rd Overall Vuelta a España

1st Stages 1 (TTT) & 6
Held after Stages 2, 6–8
Held after Stage 15
Held after Stages 6–17

3rd Strade Bianche
4th Overall Tour de France
4th Amstel Gold Race
5th Overall Tour of the Basque Country
2015 (8)
1st UCI World Tour
1st Road race, National Championships
1st Liège–Bastogne–Liège
1st La Flèche Wallonne
1st Trofeo Serra de Tramuntana
2nd Overall Volta a Catalunya

1st Stages 2, 5 & 7

2nd Amstel Gold Race
2nd Trofeo Andratx–Mirador d'es Colomer
3rd Overall Tour de France
3rd Overall Tour of Oman
3rd Clásica de San Sebastián
3rd Strade Bianche
4th Overall Dubai Tour
4th Giro di Lombardia
5th Road race, UCI World Championships
5th GP Miguel Induráin
6th Vuelta a La Rioja
7th Overall Vuelta a España

1st Points classification
1st Stage 4

7th Overall Abu Dhabi Tour
9th Overall Critérium du Dauphiné
2016 (7)
1st Overall Vuelta a Castilla y León

1st Points classification
1st Combination classification
1st Stages 2 & 3

1st Overall Vuelta a Andalucía

1st Stage 5

1st La Flèche Wallonne
2nd Vuelta a Murcia
National Championships

3rd Time trial
4th Road race

3rd Overall Giro d'Italia

1st Stage 16

3rd Clásica de San Sebastián
4th UCI World Tour
4th Klasika Primavera
5th Trofeo Serra de Tramuntana
6th Overall Tour de France
6th Giro di Lombardia
8th Trofeo Pollenca–Port de Andratx
10th Strade Bianche
Vuelta a España

Held after Stage 8
Held after Stages 10–19

2017 (11)
1st Overall Volta a Catalunya

1st Mountains classification
1st Stages 3, 5 & 7

1st Overall Tour of the Basque Country

1st Points classification
1st Stage 5

1st Overall Vuelta a Andalucía

1st Points classification
1st Stage 1

1st Liège–Bastogne–Liège
1st La Flèche Wallonne
1st Vuelta a Murcia
2nd Road race, National Championships
2nd Trofeo Pollenca–Port de Andratx
7th UCI World Tour
9th Overall Critérium du Dauphiné
9th Trofeo Serra de Tramuntana
2018 (14)
1st Road race, UCI World Championships
1st Overall Volta a Catalunya

1st Mountains classification
1st Stages 2 & 4

1st Overall Route d'Occitanie

1st Points classification
1st Stage 3

1st Overall Abu Dhabi Tour

1st Stage 5

1st Overall Volta a la Comunitat Valenciana

1st Stages 2 & 4

1st GP Miguel Induráin
National Championships

2nd Road race
4th Time trial

2nd La Flèche Wallonne
2nd Klasika Primavera
2nd Vuelta a Murcia
3rd UCI World Tour
3rd Milano–Torino
3rd Trofeo Serra de Tramuntana
4th Trofeo Lloseta–Andratx
4th Strade Bianche
5th Overall Vuelta a España

1st Points classification
1st Stages 2 & 8
Held after Stages 5 & 7–18

5th Amstel Gold Race
Combativity award Stage 11 Tour de France
2019 (5)
1st Road race, National Championships
1st Overall Route d'Occitanie

1st Stage 1

2nd Overall Vuelta a España

1st Stage 7

2nd Overall UAE Tour

1st Stage 3

2nd Overall Volta a la Comunitat Valenciana
2nd Overall Vuelta a Murcia
2nd Giro di Lombardia
2nd Milano–Torino
2nd Gran Premio Bruno Beghelli
3rd Trofeo Serra de Tramuntana
4th Trofeo Campos, Porreres, Felanitx, Ses Salines
5th Giro dell'Emilia
7th Milan–San Remo
8th Tour of Flanders
9th Overall Tour de France
10th Overall Volta a Catalunya
10th Clásica de San Sebastián
10th Trofeo Andratx–Lloseta
2020
2nd Trofeo Serra de Tramuntana
8th Road race, UCI World Championships
10th Overall Vuelta a España

Combativity award Stage 7

10th Overall Volta a la Comunitat Valenciana
10th Pollença–Andratx
2021 (3)
1st GP Miguel Induráin
1st Stage 6 Critérium du Dauphiné
2nd Overall Giro di Sicilia

1st Stage 3

3rd La Flèche Wallonne
4th Overall Volta a Catalunya
4th Liège–Bastogne–Liège
5th Giro di Lombardia
5th Amstel Gold Race
7th Overall Tour of the Basque Country
8th GP Industria & Artigianato di Larciano
9th Coppa Ugo Agostoni
10th Milano–Torino
2022 (3)
1st Overall O Gran Camiño

1st Points classification
1st Stage 3

1st Trofeo Pollença–Port d'Andratx
2nd La Flèche Wallonne
2nd Strade Bianche
2nd Coppa Ugo Agostoni
2nd Trofeo Serra de Tramuntana
3rd Tre Valli Varesine
4th Overall Route d'Occitanie
4th Giro dell'Emilia
5th Overall Volta a la Comunitat Valenciana
6th Giro di Lombardia
6th Trofeo Calvià
7th Liège–Bastogne–Liège
9th Circuito de Getxo
Combativity award Stage 20 Vuelta a España

==== General classification results timeline ====
Grand Tour general classification results
Grand Tour	2002	2003	2004	2005	2006	2007	2008	2009	2010	2011	2012	2013	2014	2015	2016	2017	2018	2019	2020	2021	2022
Giro d'Italia	—	—	—	—	—	—	—	—	—	—	—	—	—	—	3	—	—	—	—	—	11
Tour de France	—	—	—	DNF	DNF	6	8	—	—	—	20	8	4	3	6	DNF	14	9	12	24	—
/ Vuelta a España	DNF	3	4	—	2	—	5	1	—	—	2	3	3	7	12	—	5	2	10	DNF	13
Major stage race general classification results
Major stage race	2002	2003	2004	2005	2006	2007	2008	2009	2010	2011	2012	2013	2014	2015	2016	2017	2018	2019	2020	2021	2022
Paris–Nice	—	—	—	2	—	—	—	—	~~2~~	—	3	—	—	—	—	—	—	—	—	—	—
/ Tirreno–Adriatico	119	—	—	—	—	—	—	—	—	—	—	—	—	—	18	—	—	—	—	—	—
Volta a Catalunya	34	—	33	80	—	—	—	1	—	—	DNF	DNF	—	2	—	1	1	10	NH	4	DNF
Tour of the Basque Country	47	5	6	28	2	5	—	—	~~2~~	—	—	—	5	—	—	1	—	—	NH	7	—
Tour de Romandie	24	—	—	—	3	—	—	4	~~1~~	—	—	9	—	—	—	—	—	—	NH	—	—
Critérium du Dauphiné	—	—	—	—	6	DNF	1	1	—	—	—	7	—	9	—	9	—	—	12	14	—
Tour de Suisse	—	—	—	DNF	—	—	—	—	—	—	9	—	—	—	—	—	—	—	NH	—	—

==== Classics results timeline ====
Monument	2002	2003	2004	2005	2006	2007	2008	2009	2010	2011	2012	2013	2014	2015	2016	2017	2018	2019	2020	2021	2022
Milan–San Remo	130	54	—	33	24	—	—	—	—	—	—	—	—	20	15	—	—	7	—	—	—
Tour of Flanders	—	—	—	—	—	—	—	—	—	—	—	—	—	—	—	—	—	8	—	—	—
Paris–Roubaix	Did not contest during his career																				
Liège–Bastogne–Liège	—	—	—	33	1	2	1	19	~~3~~	—	DSQ	3	2	1	16	1	13	DNF	—	4	7
Giro di Lombardia	—	39	—	12	DNF	—	—	—	—	—	—	2	2	4	6	—	11	2	—	5	6
Classic	2002	2003	2004	2005	2006	2007	2008	2009	2010	2011	2012	2013	2014	2015	2016	2017	2018	2019	2020	2021	2022
Strade Bianche	Race did not exist					—	—	—	—	—	—	13	3	3	10	—	4	—	—	47	2
E3 Harelbeke	—	—	—	—	—	—	—	—	—	—	—	—	63	—	—	—	—	—	NH	—	—
Dwars door Vlaanderen	—	—	—	—	—	—	—	—	—	—	—	—	36	—	—	—	11	31	NH	—	—
Amstel Gold Race	DNF	—	—	13	23	6	3	21	—	—	22	2	4	2	—	19	5	66	NH	5	—
La Flèche Wallonne	—	—	—	40	1	2	21	7	~~8~~	—	46	7	1	1	1	1	2	11	—	3	2
Clásica de San Sebastián	157	—	61	—	8	3	1	17	—	—	26	2	1	3	3	—	—	10	NH	—	DNF
Giro dell'Emilia	—	—	—	—	—	—	—	—	—	—	—	—	—	—	—	—	—	5	—	—	4
Tre Valli Varesine	—	—	—	—	—	—	—	—	—	—	—	—	—	—	—	—	15	DNF	NH	DNF	3
Milano–Torino	—	37	—	—	—	—	Not held				—	6	—	—	—	—	3	2	—	10	—
Paris–Tours	DNF	—	—	20	—	59	—	—	—	—	—	—	—	—	—	—	—	—	—	—	—

==== Major championships timeline ====
Event		2003	2004	2005	2006	2007	2008	2009	2010	2011	2012	2013	2014	2015	2016	2017	2018	2019	2020	2021	2022
Olympic Games	Road race	NH	46	Not held			12	Not held			18	Not held			30	Not held				42	NH
World Championships	Road race	2	6	2	3	57	37	9	—	—	3	3	3	5	—	—	1	DNF	8	—	—
National Championships	Time trial	—	—	—	—	—	—	—	—	—	—	5	1	—	3	—	4	—	—	—	—
National Championships	Road race	—	2	8	—	2	1	3	—	—	—	6	2	1	4	2	2	1	—	—	—

Legend
—	Did not compete
DNF	Did not finish
DSQ	Disqualified
~~No.~~	Voided result
NH	Not held

== Awards and honours ==
In 2018, Valverde was the recipient of the Vélo d'Or. He had previously been runner-up to Paolo Bettini in 2006, and third in 2014.

Following his gold medal in the 2018 UCI World Road Race Championships, a section of the N-340 road in Murcia was renamed Avenida Alejandro Valverde (English: Alejandro Valverde Avenue).
