= Bauke Mollema =

Dutch road racing cyclist

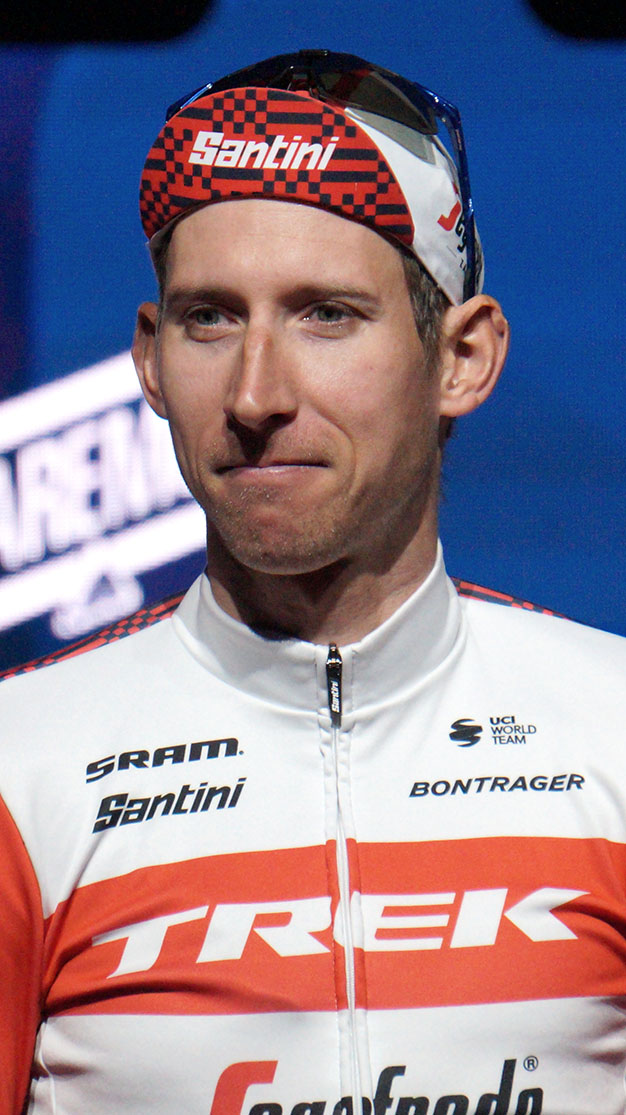
- Mollema in 2023

Personal information
- Full name: Bauke Mollema
- Nicknames: De Tuinman; (English: The Gardener)
- Born: 26 November 1986 (age 39) Groningen, Netherlands
- Height: 1.83 m (6 ft 0 in)
- Weight: 64 kg (141 lb)

Cycling career
- Sport: Cycling
- Current team: Lidl–Trek
- Discipline: Road
- Role: Rider
- Rider type: All-rounder

Amateur teams
- 2004–2006: Noordelijke Wielervereniging
- 2006: Team Löwik Meubelen (stagiaire)
- 2007: Rabobank Continental Team

Professional teams
- 2008–2014: Rabobank
- 2015–2026: Trek Factory Racing

Major wins
- Grand Tours Tour de France 2 individual stages (2017, 2021) Vuelta a España Points classification (2011) 1 individual stage (2013) One-day races and Classics National Time Trial Championships (2022) Giro di Lombardia (2019) Clásica de San Sebastián (2016) Trofeo Laigueglia (2021) Gran Premio Bruno Beghelli (2018) Japan Cup (2015, 2019)
Medal record
Men's road bicycle racing
Representing the Netherlands
World Championships
Gold medal – first place	2019 Yorkshire	Mixed team relay
Silver medal – second place	2021 Flanders	Mixed team relay
European Championships
Gold medal – first place	2019 Alkmaar	Mixed team relay
Bronze medal – third place	2021 Trentino	Mixed team relay

Bauke Mollema (Dutch: [ˈbʌukə ˈmɔləmaː]; born 26 November 1986) is a Dutch professional cyclist, who rides for UCI WorldTeam Lidl–Trek. He has finished in the top 10 in all three Grand Tours, with stage wins in the 2021 Tour de France, 2017 Tour de France, and the 2013 Vuelta a España. His best result in the general classification in the Tour de France came in 2013 when he finished in 6th place. He won the Clásica de San Sebastián in 2016 and finished on the podium on three other occasions at the race. In 2019, he achieved the biggest win of his career in Il Lombardia.

== Career ==
=== Amateur career ===
In 2007 Mollema won the prestigious stage race for upcoming talents Tour de l'Avenir and the Circuito Montañés.

=== Rabobank (2008–2014) ===
==== 2008–2010 ====
He joined the Rabobank ProTeam in 2008, signing his first contract as a professional. His first notable result was a 6th position in the final classification of the 2008 Vuelta a Castilla y León. He made his ProTour debut in the Tour de Romandie, but did not finish the race due to a fall, which resulted in a fractured collarbone. He fully returned in top shape in the Deutschland Tour, in which he started as Rabobank's team leader, eventually finishing 7th in the overall general classification. After a disappointing spring in 2009, the season was over for Mollema due to infectious mononucleosis (Pfeiffer's disease).

Mollema made his Grand Tour debut in the 2010 Giro d'Italia in which he made a good impression but fell short of a top 10 classification and winning the young rider competition, partially due to missing out on a break-away of 50 riders in which a lot of direct opponents gained a 12-minute lead. Mollema continued to ride strong later in the season with a mountain stage win in the Tour de Pologne and a third place overall after winner Dan Martin and runner-up Grega Bole.

==== 2011 ====
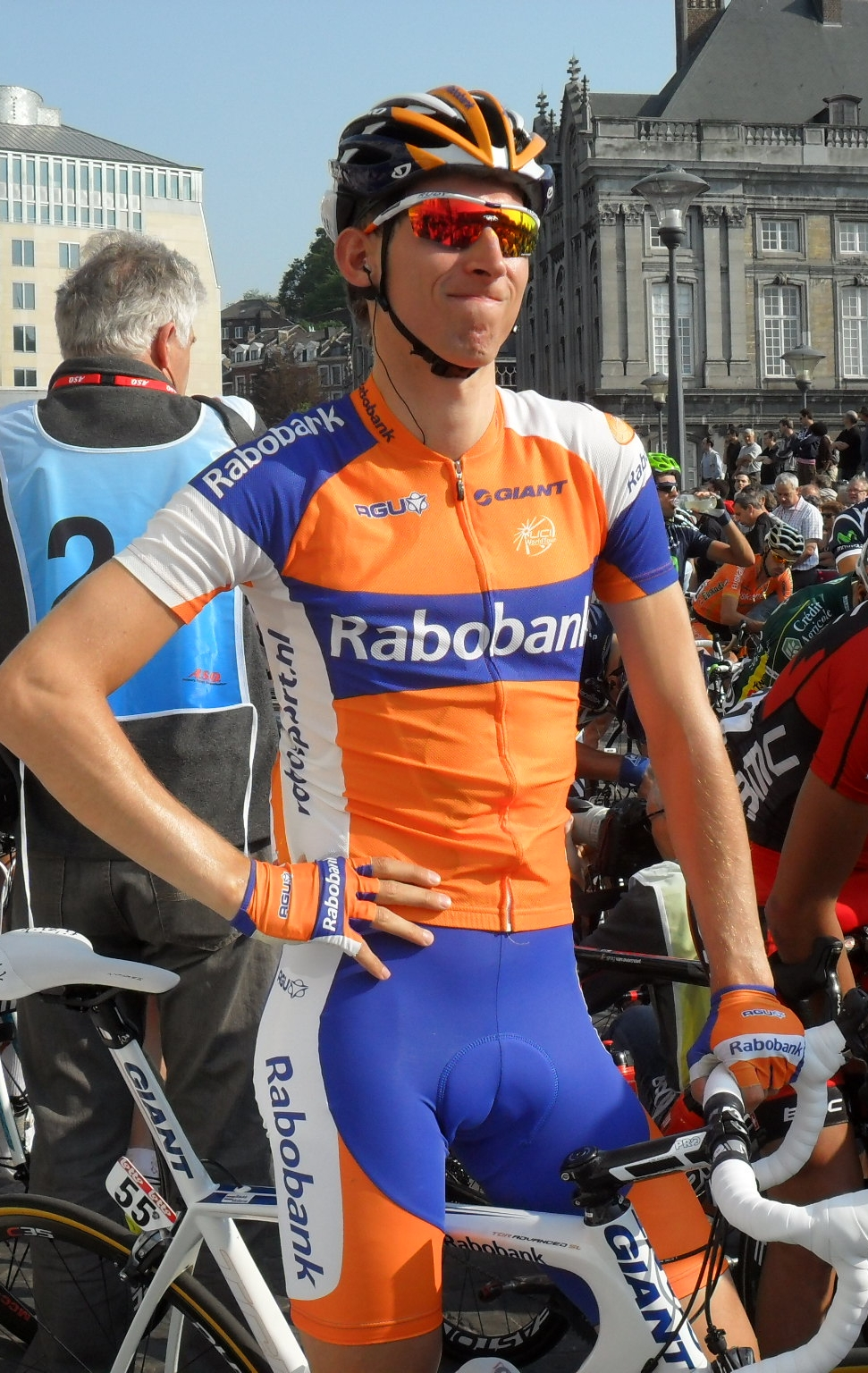
Mollema at the 2011 Liège–Bastogne–Liège

In the spring of 2011 he already showed good form with a ninth place overall in Paris–Nice and tenth overall in the Volta a Catalunya. He eventually did not show his good form in the Ardennes classics and rode disappointing results. The main objective of Mollema's 2011 season was his first ever Tour de France. As preparation for the Tour he rode, together with teammate Steven Kruijswijk, the Tour de Suisse. Both riders performed extremely well in a strong field. This resulted for Kruijswijk in a podium finish but Mollema fell short for the podium due to a flat tyre. Due to illness his general classification performance in the Tour de France was not a success. In the last week he stated that he felt better and tried for a break-away. This resulted in a second place in the 17th stage after Edvald Boasson Hagen of Team Sky.

Mollema returned to action in his third Grand Tour, the Vuelta a España. On the steep uphill finishes in stages 5 and 8 he finished in the top five. He did not lose any crucial time in the first week and was awarded the red leader's jersey after his second place in stage 9. Due to his weaker time trial skills compared to other general classification contenders such as Bradley Wiggins, Chris Froome and Vincenzo Nibali, he lost the leader's jersey a day after he had won it. Mollema rode well after the time trial and was heading for a podium position, but he fell to fourth place overall due to the performance of Juan José Cobo on the Alto de l'Angliru. Mollema eventually came onto the podium in Madrid as winner of the points classification. It was the first time since 1992 that a Dutchman won a major classification in a Grand Tour, after Eddy Bouwmans won the young rider classification in the Tour de France.

On 18 July 2019, Mollema was officially elevated to third overall in the Vuelta after Cobo was disqualified for being found guilty of abnormalities related to performance-enhancing drugs on his biological passport, earning Mollema his first ever podium finish in a Grand Tour.

==== 2012 ====
During the spring of 2012, Mollema rode his best classics campaign at the time. He finished 10th at his home race, the Amstel Gold Race, 7th at La Flèche Wallonne and 6th at Liège–Bastogne–Liège to take his first top 10 finishes in a monument race. He had no success in the Grand Tours, as he abandoned the Tour de France, and finished 28th overall at the Vuelta a España. He had other successes during the year, as he took his first overall podium in a World Tour stage race, when he finished 3rd in the Tour of the Basque Country. He also started in his first Clásica de San Sebastián finishing 5th, a race that he later had great success in. Mollema finished off the season with a 7th place at a rainy Giro di Lombardia.

==== 2013 ====
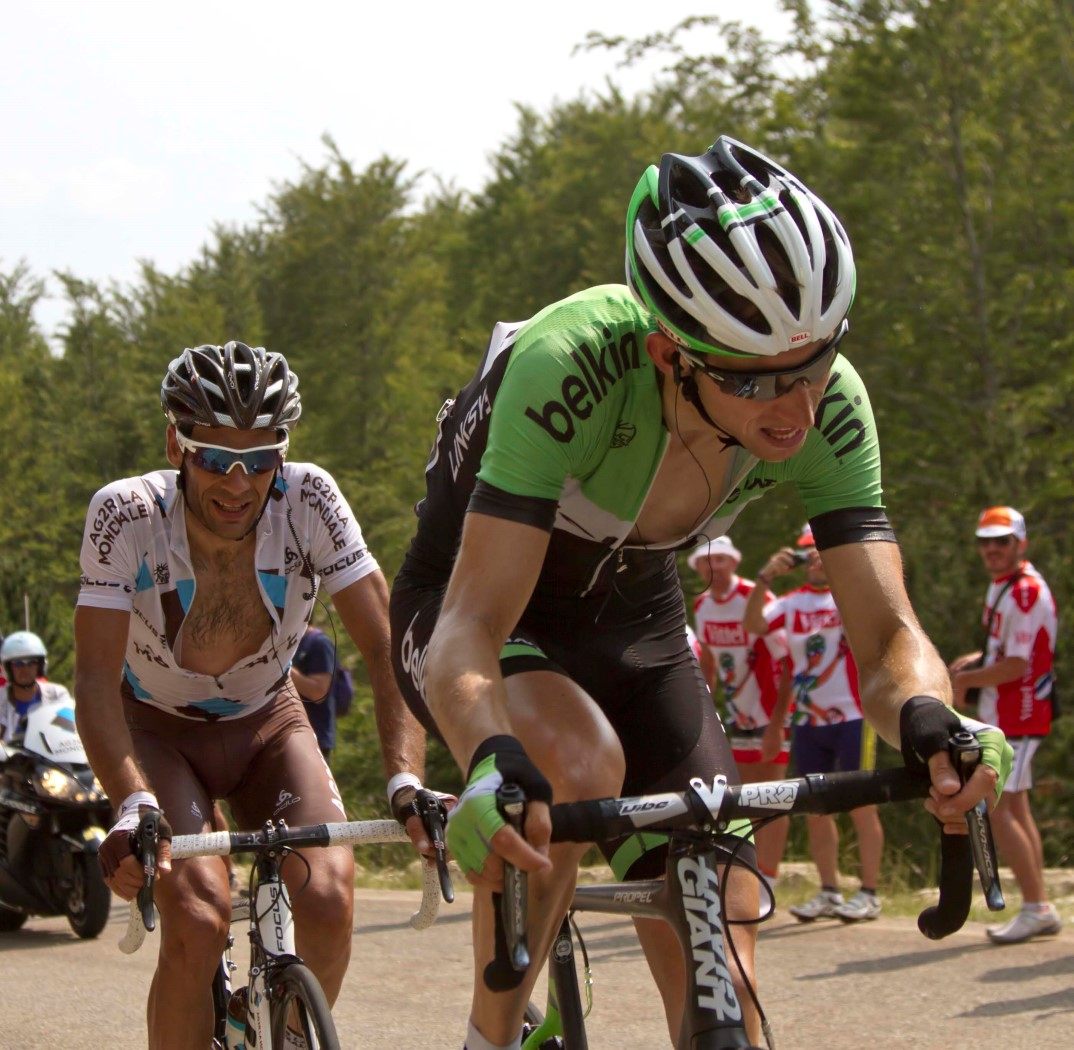
Mollema at the 2013 Tour de France

In 2013, Mollema carried some good form finishing 2nd in the Vuelta a Murcia, 3rd in the Vuelta a Andalucía, and 4th in the Criterium International. In the Tour de Suisse, Mollema won stage 2 marking his first victory in 2013. After having a strong ride in the mountains, Mollema entered the final time trial in 4th position. He later moved up into 2nd that day. Mollema's good form continued at the Tour de France, where he finished fourth on the first mountain stage to Ax 3 Domaines to rise to fourth in the general classification. He finished eighth on the next stage and rose to third overall after Richie Porte lost more than 18 minutes. On stage 13 he rose to second in general classification when Alejandro Valverde lost almost 10 minutes after suffering a puncture with approximately 80 kilometres (50 miles) left, while also gaining over a minute on Froome's lead. However, he lost time in the last week due to illness, and finished 6th in the general classification. Mollema also rode the Vuelta a España. He won Stage 17 of the race by attacking from the peloton 500 metres (1,600 feet) from the line, and holding off the chasing pack led home by Edvald Boasson Hagen (Team Sky).

==== 2014 ====
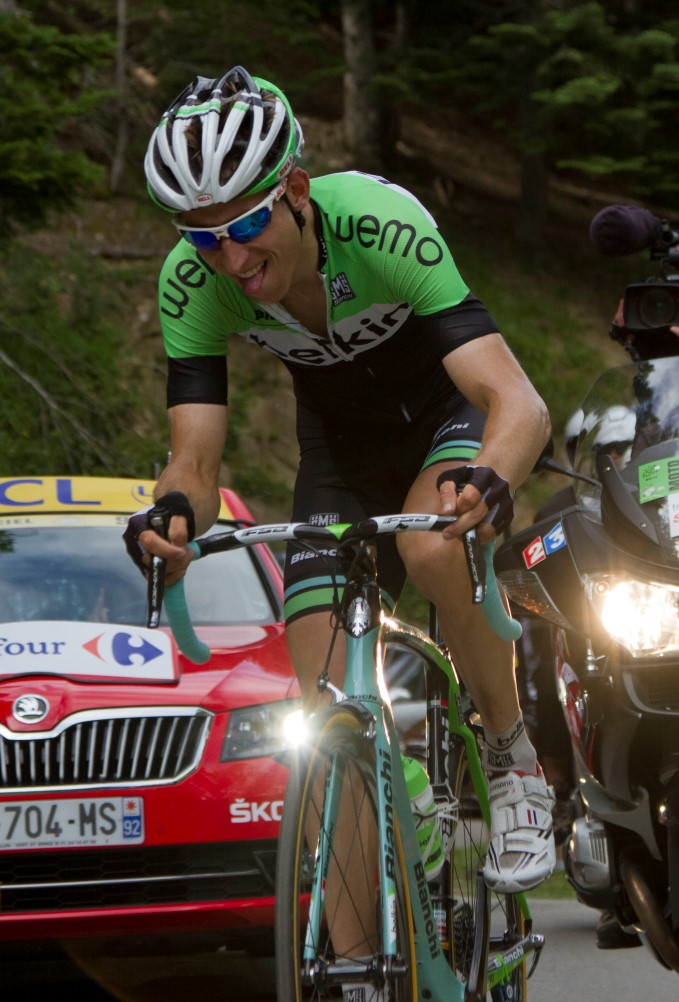
Mollema at the 2014 Tour de France

At the Tour de France, Mollema sat seventh overall heading into the penultimate stage, an individual time trial 54 kilometres (34 miles) in length. However, riding a new Bianchi for the first time, Mollema could only place in 140th position and slipped to tenth overall in the general classification, 21 minutes and 24 seconds behind the winner, Vincenzo Nibali. He quickly redeemed himself one week later, where he took his first podium at Clásica de San Sebastián, when he finished 2nd just behind Alejandro Valverde.

=== Trek Factory Racing (2015–present) ===
At the end of the 2014 season, Mollema left Belkin Pro Cycling to join Trek Factory Racing.

==== 2015 ====
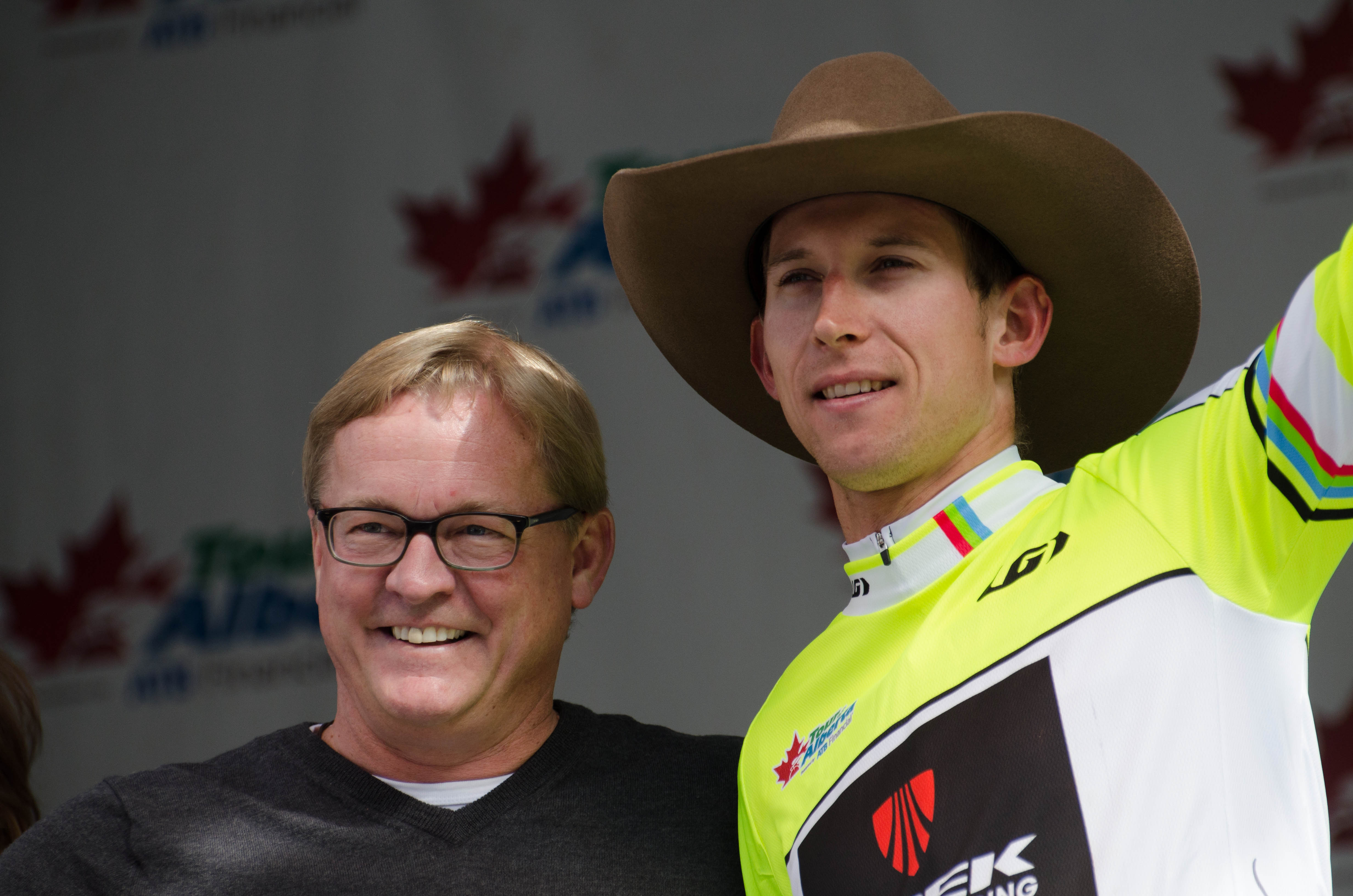
Mollema (right) with Alberta Culture Minister David Eggen following his win in the 2015 Tour of Alberta.

Mollema's first podium with his new team came at February's Vuelta a Murcia, where he finished second to Rein Taaramäe. In March, Mollema finished second overall behind Nairo Quintana (Movistar Team) at Tirreno–Adriatico. Mollema finished seventh overall in the Tour de France, having moved definitively into the top ten overall at the midway point of the race. In September, Mollema won the Tour of Alberta stage race in Canada. He finished the season with another victory in October, winning a sprint of four riders in the Japan Cup in Utsunomiya.

==== 2016 ====
In the early part of the season, Mollema finished in third place overall at the Vuelta a Andalucía, moving up from fourteenth on the final stage. On Stage 12 of the Tour de France, Mollema bridged across to an attack by race leader Chris Froome (Team Sky) and Richie Porte (BMC Racing Team) on Mont Ventoux, and was the only general classification contender able to do so. However, all 3 riders were involved in a crash with a motorbike after spectators on the road forced the motorbike to stop. Mollema was able to remount his bike and continued riding, while Porte was delayed and passed by the other general classification contenders and Froome ditched his bike and continued on foot until receiving a replacement bike from his team car. Mollema finished the stage 1 minute and 40 seconds ahead of Froome, and the initial standings placed Mollema in second overall behind new leader Adam Yates (Orica–BikeExchange). However, Froome was awarded the same time as Mollema after a jury decision, and retained the yellow jersey. The revised standings also placed Nairo Quintana ahead of Mollema, who was now fourth overall. Mollema criticised the UCI's handling of the stage afterwards.

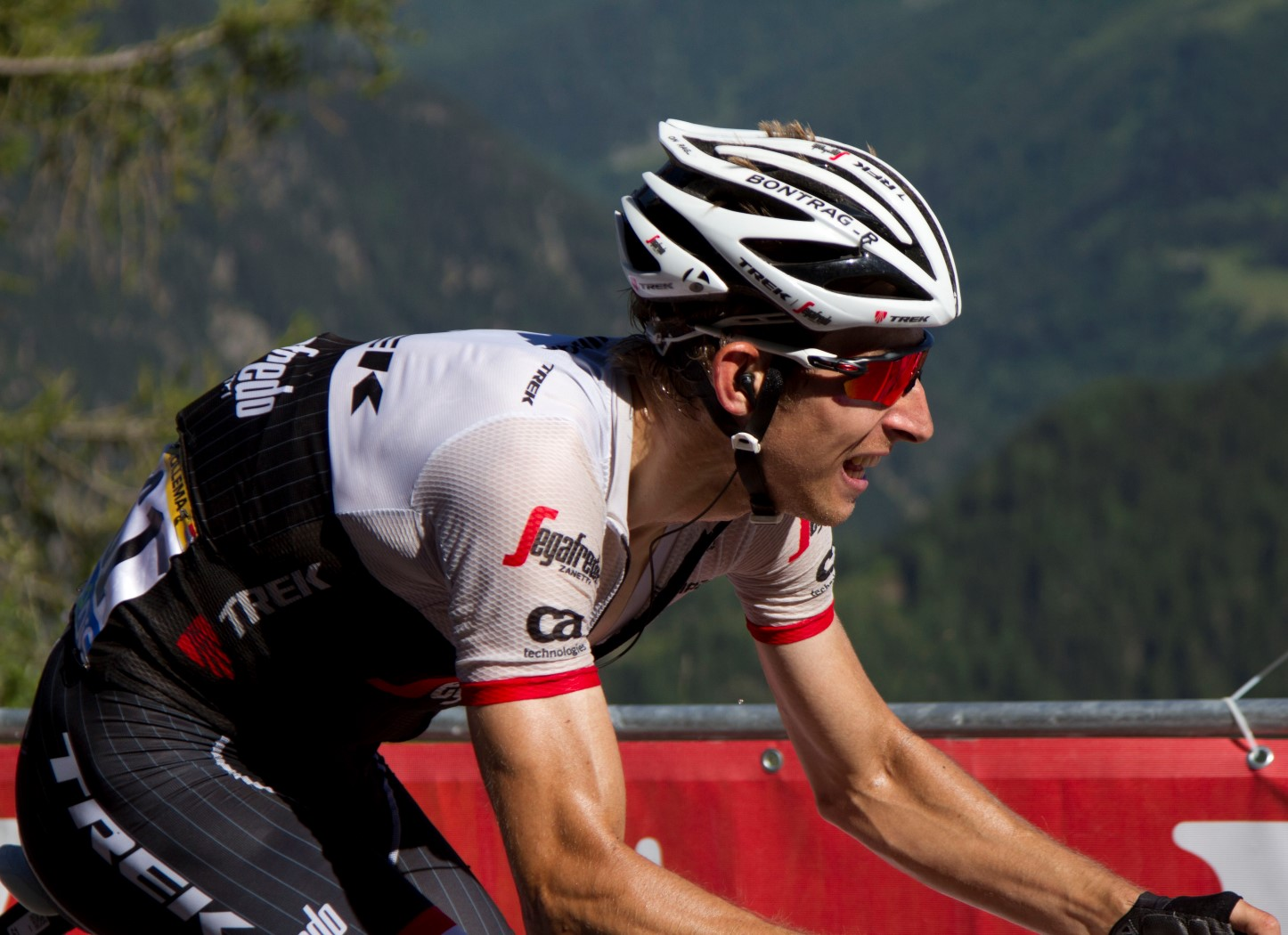
Mollema at the 2016 Tour de France

On Stage 13, Mollema produced what he described as "the best time trial of my life" to place sixth on the hilly 37.5-kilometre (23.3-mile) route. He finished 51 seconds down on Froome, but took time out of all the other general classification contenders and rose to second overall, 1' 47" behind Froome. Mollema maintained his second position overall until stage 19; having started the stage 3' 52" in arrears of Froome, Mollema crashed on a descent, and ultimately lost almost four minutes to Froome, dropping from second to tenth overall. He ultimately fell to eleventh overall in the final general classification. The following weekend, Mollema managed to rebound at Clásica de San Sebastián, winning after a late attack.

==== 2017 ====
In his third season with Trek–Segafredo, Mollema opted to ride the general classification at the Giro d'Italia, as Alberto Contador rode the Tour de France as team leader. He took his first win in January, where he won the overall classification in the Vuelta a San Juan. His next good result came in February, where he finished 4th overall at the new World Tour race, the Abu Dhabi Tour. On the first real test at the Giro d'Italia, Mollema was 4th on stage 9 to Blockhaus. On the following stage, an individual time trial, Mollema finished tenth and rose to third place in the general classification. However he dropped out of the podium placings on the challenging stage to Oropa, as he lost almost 2 minutes to stage winner Tom Dumoulin. He ultimately finished seventh overall, which was his best result at the race to that point.

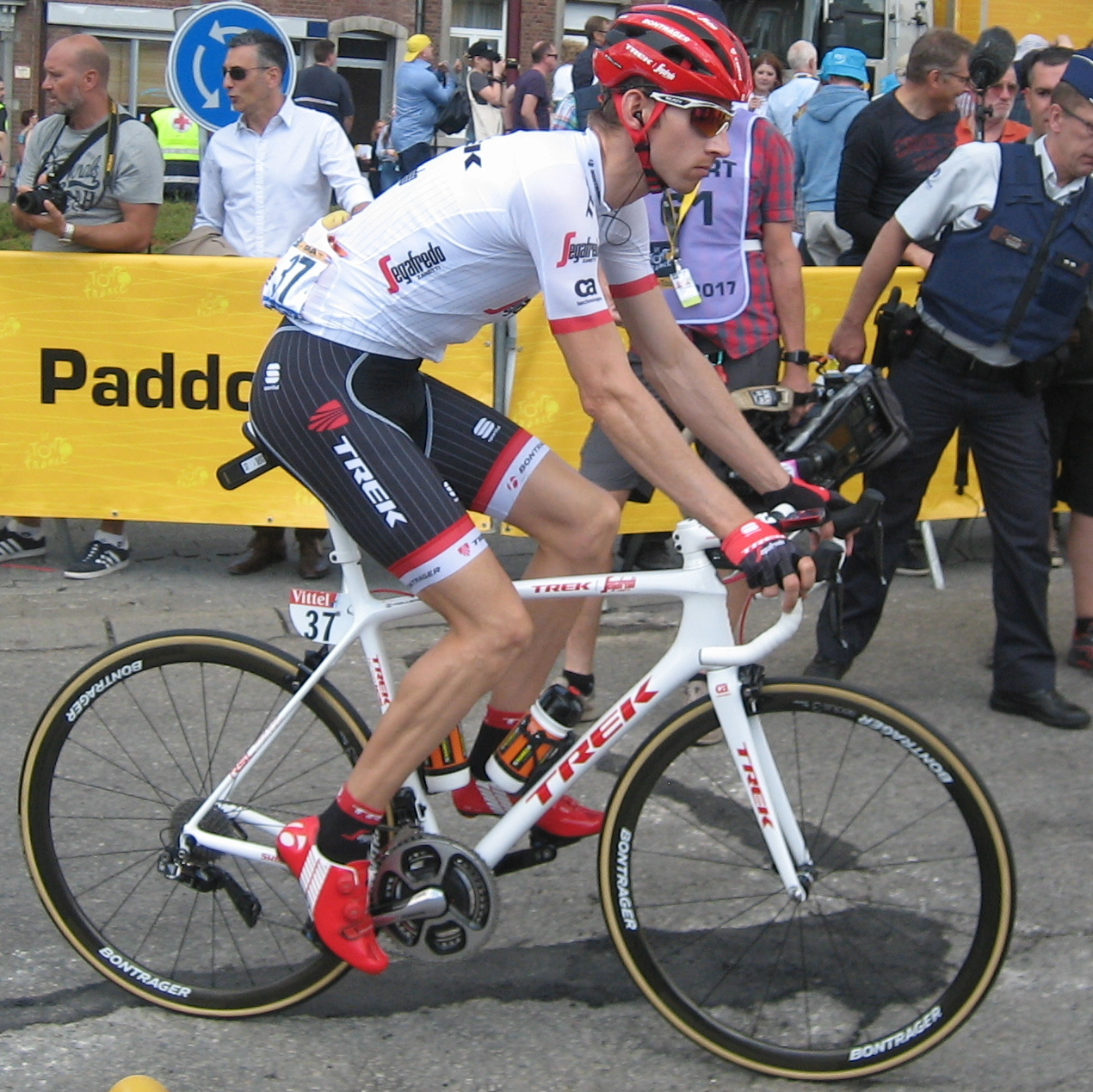
Mollema at the 2017 Tour de France, where he won a stage

His next race was the Tour de France, where he worked as a domestique for team leader Contador. He got his own chance on stage 15 where he went into the breakaway. He attacked his breakaway companions with around 30 kilometres (19 miles) remaining, just after the last major climb of the day, and managed to keep them behind all the way to the finish line, winning his first Tour de France stage win by 19 seconds, ahead of Diego Ulissi. Even though he had ridden two Grand Tours during the season, he started in Clásica de San Sebastián a week later and finished in third place, his third podium at the race. His best finish over the remainder of the season was a second-place overall finish at the Tour of Guangxi.

==== 2018 ====
After just missing out on a stage win at the Volta ao Algarve in February, Mollema took his first win of the season at the Settimana Internazionale di Coppi e Bartali where he won stage 2 and finished 2nd overall. His next result came just a week after, where he was 7th overall at the Tour of the Basque Country. The classics campaign was mixed for Mollema as he only finished in the top 10 on one occasion, at La Flèche Wallonne, with a 6th place. At the Tour de France, Mollema was once again team leader, but he cracked on the second mountain stage, and switched his focus to go for stage wins. He was very close to winning a stage, but had to settle with results of third and fourth – coming on consecutive days either side of the final rest day – as his best stage results. As he had done in the previous years, Mollema started Clásica de San Sebastián the week following the end of the Tour. He was the only one to match the pace of Julian Alaphilippe in the final, but lost the sprint for victory to Alaphilippe. At the Vuelta a España, he finished second on the fifth stage, behind Simon Clarke. Four days later he was once again in the breakaway and once again had to settle with second place, this time behind Ben King. He was also unable to catch Thomas De Gendt in the mountains classification, and thus, finished in second place. In October he won the Italian semi classic Gran Premio Bruno Beghelli, attacking from just over 2 kilometres (1.2 miles) from the finish, for his second victory of the season.

==== 2019 ====
Mollema started the 2019 season with a pair of third-place finishes in the Trofeo Ses Salines and Trofeo Andratx–Lloseta one-day races, held as part of the Vuelta a Mallorca, and a fourth-place finish in the Étoile de Bessèges stage race. He again recorded a single top-ten finish in the spring classic cycle races, finishing sixth at La Flèche Wallonne. At the Giro d'Italia, Mollema recorded a best stage result of third place during the ninth stage, which was an individual time trial that finished in San Marino. He ran as high as fourth place in the general classification, but ultimately finished the race in fifth place – his best result in the race to that point. Following the Tour de France, he recorded a fifth-place finish at the Clásica de San Sebastián. Either side of a tenth-place finish at the Grand Prix Cycliste de Montréal, Mollema won gold medals as part of the Dutch team in the inaugural team relay events at both the European Championships and the World Championships.

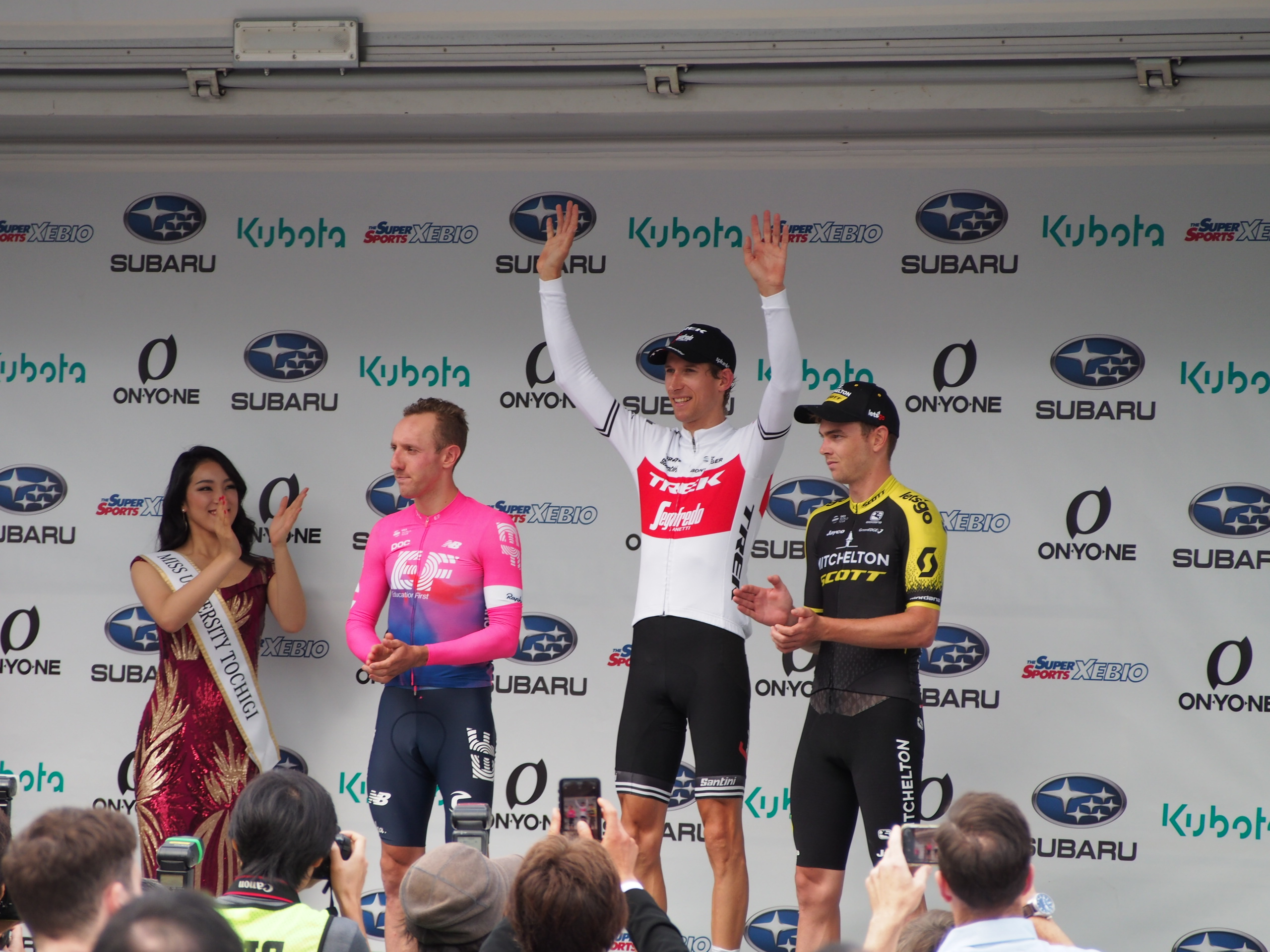
Mollema (in the white jersey) celebrates his second victory in the 2019 Japan Cup

Following the World Championships, Mollema took two individual victories in October: the first of these came in the final cycling monument of the season, Il Lombardia. With approximately 18 kilometres (11 miles) remaining, and on the penultimate climb, Mollema made a solo move and held off his closest rivals – Alejandro Valverde, Egan Bernal and Jakob Fuglsang – by sixteen seconds to take the victory, and his first monument. As a result, he became the first Dutch rider to win the race since Hennie Kuiper did so in 1981. He followed this victory up a week later with his second Japan Cup victory, winning a sprint à deux against Michael Woods in Utsunomiya.

==== 2020 ====
Mollema started his 2020 season at the Volta ao Algarve in late February, finishing in eighth place overall. After two DNFs the following weekend in France, he did not contest another race until August as a result of the COVID-19 pandemic-enforced suspension of racing. He took three top-six finishes ahead of the Tour de France; he finished fifth overall at the Route d'Occitanie, sixth overall at the Tour de l'Ain, and fourth in defence of his Il Lombardia title. At the Tour de France, Mollema shared team leadership with Richie Porte at Trek–Segafredo, but crashed out of the race on the thirteenth stage, while in thirteenth place overall – his first abandonment at the race since 2012. Suffering a fractured wrist, Mollema's 2020 season was ended as a result of the crash.

==== 2021 ====
Mollema started the 2021 season with a block of short stage races in France, finishing sixth overall at the Tour de la Provence, and at the Tour des Alpes-Maritimes et du Var, Mollema won a stage, finished third overall and won the points classification. Mollema then contested several one-day races in Italy, taking a victory at Trofeo Laigueglia after a 15-kilometre (9.3-mile) solo move, and then finished second to Mauri Vansevenant in a small group sprint at the GP Industria & Artigianato di Larciano. In April, he finished seventh at the GP Miguel Induráin, and eighth in Liège–Bastogne–Liège. He rode the Giro d'Italia, getting into four breakaways and recorded a best stage result of fifth place on stage fourteen, which finished on Monte Zoncolan.

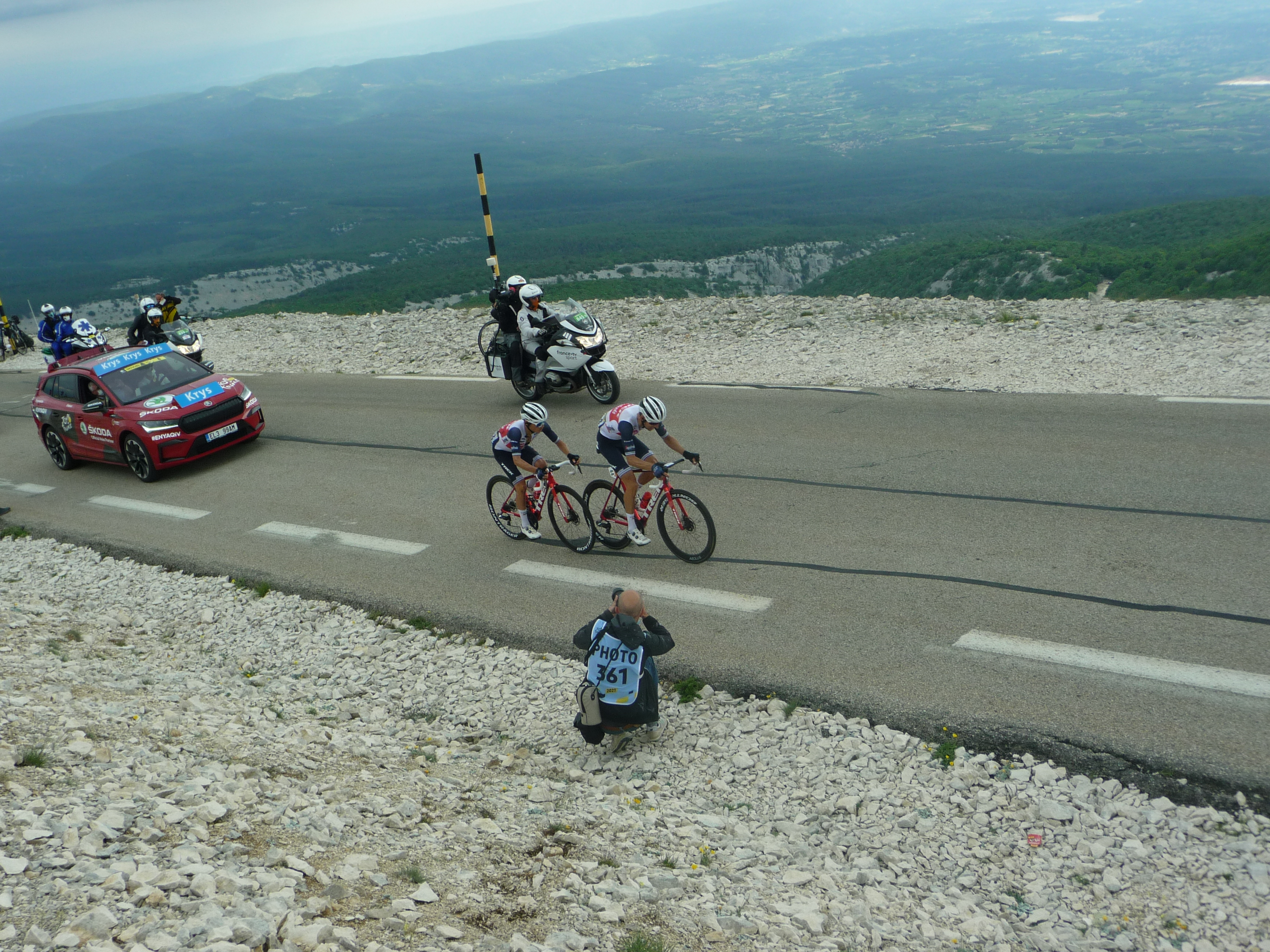
Mollema (right) leads teammate Kenny Elissonde during the final ascent of Mont Ventoux during the eleventh stage of the 2021 Tour de France

He took top-ten finishes on each of the first two stages at the Tour de France, before falling towards the bottom of the top twenty placings by the end of the first week. On stage 11 – which included a double ascent of Mont Ventoux – Mollema was in contention for the stage win, but ended up finishing 3rd, crossing the line with teammate Kenny Elissonde, as Wout van Aert went on to win the stage. On stage 14 he joined a breakaway of fourteen riders, which had taken over an hour to form. With just under 43 kilometres (27 miles) to go in the stage he rode clear of the surviving breakaway riders and rode solo all the way to the finish, claiming his second Tour de France stage victory. His next start came in the road race at the COVID-19 pandemic-delayed Tokyo Olympics, where he sprinted in the group contesting the minor medals behind winner Richard Carapaz, but missed out in fourth place. He won medals in the team relay events at the European Championships (bronze), and the World Championships (silver), but took no further individual victories during the remainder of 2021.

==== 2022 ====
Mollema again finished inside the top-five placings at February's Tour des Alpes-Maritimes et du Var, with a fifth-place overall finish – but this was to be his only such result prior to the Giro d'Italia. On the seventh stage, Mollema was part of a seven-rider breakaway which included three of his compatriots; one of them beat him to the line in Potenza, as Koen Bouwman outsprinted him to the line for the victory. He also made it into two further breakaways during the race without success; at the race's conclusion, he signed a contract extension with Trek–Segafredo that would see him remain with the team until the end of the 2026 season. Following this, he contested the Dutch National Time Trial Championships for the first time and won the 29.6-kilometre (18.4-mile) race by more than half a minute ahead of his closest rival, Tom Dumoulin.

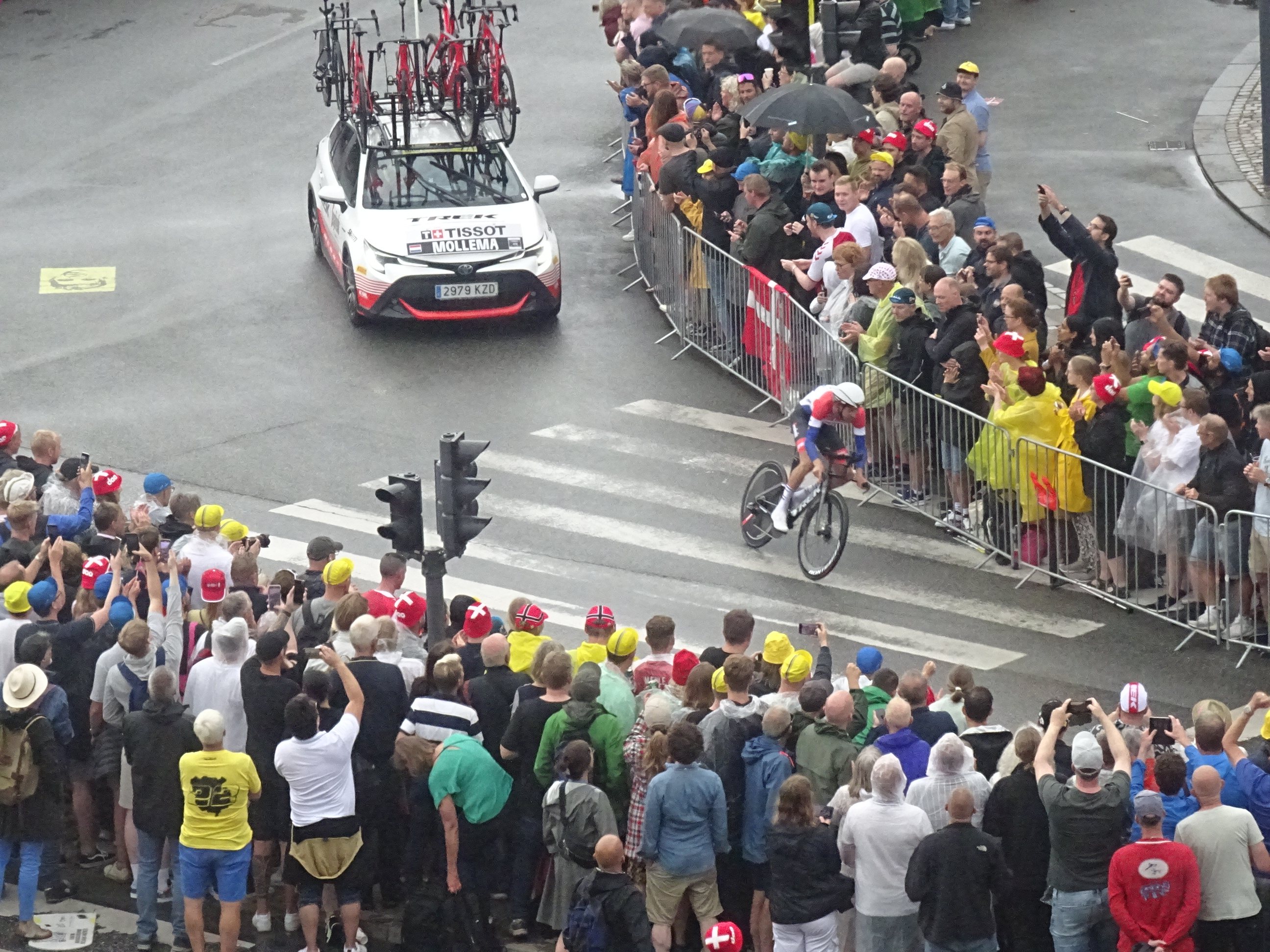
Mollema during the opening individual time trial stage at the 2022 Tour de France. This was his first race in the Dutch national time trial champion's jersey, having won it nine days earlier in Emmen.

He wore the national champion's jersey for the first time at the Tour de France, where he finished in the top-ten placings of both individual time trial stages, recording a best result of sixth on the penultimate day. He finished in fourth place at August's Clásica de San Sebastián, and missed out on a victory in the prologue of the Deutschland Tour by two seconds to Filippo Ganna. The Netherlands missed out on a medal in the mixed team relay for the first time at the UCI Road World Championships, with Mollema suffering a mechanical and the second of two incidents where he was attacked by a magpie while riding (the first having occurred during training). In October, he recorded seventh-place finishes at both Tre Valli Varesine and Il Lombardia.

==== 2023 ====
In the first half of the 2023 season, Mollema recorded an eighth-place overall finish at the Volta ao Algarve, and a fourth-place finish on the fifteenth stage at the Giro d'Italia. In June, he was unable to retain his title at the Dutch National Time Trial Championships, where he finished in fifth place, over a 42-kilometre (26-mile) course. He was not selected by the renamed Lidl–Trek team for the Tour de France, ending a twelve-year consecutive starts streak at the race.

== Major results ==
2006
7th Overall Vuelta Ciclista a León

1st Stage 2

2007
1st Overall Tour de l'Avenir
1st Overall Circuito Montañés

1st Young rider classification
1st Stage 6

3rd Overall Tour de l'Ain

1st Young rider classification

4th Overall Tour du Haut-Anjou
4th Overall Vuelta a Navarra
4th Overall Vuelta Ciclista a León
4th Internationale Wielertrofee Jong Maar Moedig
10th Overall Settimana Ciclistica Lombarda
10th De Vlaamse Pijl
2008
6th Overall Vuelta a Castilla y León
7th Overall Deutschland Tour
2010 (1 pro win)
3rd Overall Tour de Pologne

1st Stage 6

5th Overall Vuelta a Andalucía
8th Giro del Piemonte
2011
2nd Overall Vuelta a Castilla y León

1st Combination classification

2nd Giro dell'Emilia
3rd Overall Vuelta a España

1st Points classification
Held after Stage 9
Held after Stages 9–12

5th Road race, National Road Championships
5th Overall Tour de Suisse
5th Gran Premio Bruno Beghelli
9th Overall Paris–Nice
10th Overall Volta a Catalunya
2012
3rd Overall Tour of the Basque Country
5th Clásica de San Sebastián
6th Liège–Bastogne–Liège
7th La Flèche Wallonne
7th Giro di Lombardia
10th Amstel Gold Race
2013 (2)
1st Stage 17 Vuelta a España
2nd Overall Tour de Suisse

1st Stage 2

2nd Vuelta a Murcia
3rd Overall Vuelta a Andalucía
4th Overall Critérium International
4th Overall Tour of Norway
6th Overall Tour de France
6th Overall Tour Méditerranéen
9th La Flèche Wallonne
9th Clásica de San Sebastián
10th Amstel Gold Race
2014 (1)
2nd Clásica de San Sebastián
3rd Overall Tour of Norway

1st Stage 4

3rd Overall Tour de Suisse
4th La Flèche Wallonne
6th Overall Vuelta a Andalucía
7th Amstel Gold Race
10th Overall Tour de France
10th Grand Prix Cycliste de Québec
10th Grand Prix Cycliste de Montréal
2015 (2)
1st Overall Tour of Alberta

1st Stage 1 (TTT)

1st Japan Cup
2nd Overall Tirreno–Adriatico
2nd Vuelta a Murcia
4th Trofeo Andratx–Mirador d'es Colomer
6th Clásica de San Sebastián
6th Grand Prix Cycliste de Québec
7th Overall Tour de France
8th La Drôme Classic
2016 (2)
1st Clásica de San Sebastián
2nd Overall Tour of Alberta

1st Stage 4 (ITT)

3rd Overall Vuelta a Andalucía
8th Grand Prix Cycliste de Québec
9th Overall Tirreno–Adriatico
9th Overall Tour de Romandie
9th Liège–Bastogne–Liège
2017 (2)
1st Overall Vuelta a San Juan
Tour de France

1st Stage 15
Combativity award Stage 15

2nd Overall Tour of Guangxi
3rd Clásica de San Sebastián
4th Overall Abu Dhabi Tour
5th Grand Prix Cycliste de Montréal
7th Overall Giro d'Italia
9th Overall Tirreno–Adriatico
2018 (2)
1st Gran Premio Bruno Beghelli
2nd Overall Settimana Internazionale di Coppi e Bartali

1st Stage 2

2nd Clásica de San Sebastián
4th Overall Volta ao Algarve
6th La Flèche Wallonne
7th Overall Tour of the Basque Country
8th Trofeo Serra de Tramuntana
10th Trofeo Lloseta–Andratx
Vuelta a España

Combativity award Stages 5, 11, 15 & Overall

2019 (2)
1st Team relay, UCI Road World Championships
1st Team relay, UEC European Road Championships
1st Giro di Lombardia
1st Japan Cup
3rd Trofeo Campos, Porreres, Felanitx, Ses Salines
3rd Trofeo Andratx–Lloseta
4th Overall Étoile de Bessèges
4th Giro dell'Emilia
5th Overall Giro d'Italia
5th Clásica de San Sebastián
5th Gran Premio Bruno Beghelli
6th La Flèche Wallonne
7th Milano–Torino
10th Grand Prix Cycliste de Montréal
2020
4th Giro di Lombardia
5th Overall Route d'Occitanie
6th Overall Tour de l'Ain
8th Overall Volta ao Algarve
2021 (3)
1st Trofeo Laigueglia
Tour de France

1st Stage 14
Combativity award Stage 14

2nd Team relay, UCI Road World Championships
2nd GP Industria & Artigianato di Larciano
3rd Team relay, UEC European Road Championships
3rd Overall Tour des Alpes-Maritimes et du Var

1st Points classification
1st Stage 1

4th Road race, Olympic Games
6th Overall Tour de la Provence
7th Giro dell'Emilia
7th GP Miguel Induráin
8th Liège–Bastogne–Liège
10th Clásica de San Sebastián
2022 (1)
1st Time trial, National Road Championships
4th Clásica de San Sebastián
5th Overall Tour des Alpes-Maritimes et du Var
7th Giro di Lombardia
7th Tre Valli Varesine
2023
5th Time trial, National Road Championships
8th Overall Volta ao Algarve
8th Overall Tour de Wallonie
2024
6th Grand Prix Cycliste de Québec
7th Amstel Gold Race
2025
3rd Gran Piemonte
8th Overall Tour of Britain
2026
2nd Road race, National Road Championships
3rd Overall Tour of Austria

=== General classification results timeline ===
Grand Tour general classification results
Grand Tour	2008	2009	2010	2011	2012	2013	2014	2015	2016	2017	2018	2019	2020	2021	2022	2023	2024	2025	2026
Giro d'Italia	—	—	12	—	—	—	—	—	—	7	—	5	—	28	26	50	—	—	—
Tour de France	—	—	—	69	DNF	6	10	7	11	17	26	28	DNF	20	25	—	—	—	
/ Vuelta a España	—	—	—	3	28	52	—	—	—	—	30	—	—	—	—	79	—	—	
Major stage race general classification results
Race	2008	2009	2010	2011	2012	2013	2014	2015	2016	2017	2018	2019	2020	2021	2022	2023	2024	2025	2026
Paris–Nice	—	—	—	9	DNF	—	—	—	—	—	30	—	—	—	18	—	—	—	—
Tirreno–Adriatico	—	—	—	—	—	21	22	2	9	9	—	—	—	—	—	—	—	—	—
Volta a Catalunya	—	—	—	9	—	—	—	—	—	DNF	—	—	NH	—	—	—	75	—	—
Tour of the Basque Country	—	DNF	98	—	3	—	28	DNF	18	—	7	21	NH	DNF	—	43	27	DNF	DNF
Tour de Romandie	DNF	—	39	—	17	—	—	—	9	—	—	—	NH	—	—	—	—	91	DNF
Critérium du Dauphiné	—	—	—	—	—	—	—	60	DNF	—	—	—	—	—	—	—	—	—	—
Tour de Suisse	—	—	29	5	33	2	3	—	—	—	12	—	NH	—	—	—	DNF	—	54

=== Classics results timeline ===
Monument	2008	2009	2010	2011	2012	2013	2014	2015	2016	2017	2018	2019	2020	2021	2022	2023	2024	2025	2026
Milan–San Remo	—	—	—	—	—	—	37	—	—	—	—	—	—	—	—	—	—	—	—
Tour of Flanders	Has not contested during his career																		
Paris–Roubaix	Has not contested during his career																		
Liège–Bastogne–Liège	—	—	—	47	6	77	15	35	9	—	25	—	—	8	29	29	13	—	—
Giro di Lombardia	DNF	68	12	DNF	7	—	89	75	19	19	64	1	4	20	7	43	12	54	
Classic	2008	2009	2010	2011	2012	2013	2014	2015	2016	2017	2018	2019	2020	2021	2022	2023	2024	2025	2026
Strade Bianche	—	—	—	—	—	—	—	—	—	—	—	18	—	76	—	—	—	35	117
Amstel Gold Race	—	—	—	—	10	10	7	55	14	—	35	12	NH	64	—	29	7	—	58
La Flèche Wallonne	DNF	—	69	53	7	9	4	19	—	—	6	6	—	11	21	62	35	—	101
Clásica de San Sebastián	DNF	—	—	—	5	9	2	6	1	3	2	5	NH	10	4	50	—	—	
Grand Prix Cycliste de Québec	Race did not exist		—	—	—	—	10	6	8	36	—	14	NH	NH	—	—	6	—	
Grand Prix Cycliste de Montréal	Race did not exist		—	—	—	—	10	17	24	5	—	10	NH	NH	—	—	18	—	
Giro dell'Emilia	48	38	54	2	—	—	—	—	DNF	—	41	4	—	7	—	—	DNF	—	
Tre Valli Varesine	—	—	—	—	—	—	—	—	—	—	—	53	NH	DNF	7	78	—	—	
Milano–Torino	Not held				—	—	—	—	—	DNF	15	7	—	21	—	—	—	—	

=== Major championships results timeline ===
Event		2008	2009	2010	2011	2012	2013	2014	2015	2016	2017	2018	2019	2020	2021	2022	2023	2024	2025
Olympic Games	Road race	—	Not held			—	Not held			17	Not held				4	Not held		—	NH
World Championships	Time trial	—	—	—	—	—	—	—	—	—	—	—	—	—	—	25	—	—	—
World Championships	Road race	—	—	—	62	68	11	18	69	—	34	12	DNF	—	27	25	—	12	21
World Championships	Team relay	Event did not exist											1	NH	2	5	—	—	—
European Championships	Road race	Event did not exist								—	—	—	—	—	17	—	DNF	—	—
European Championships	Team relay	Event did not exist											1	—	3	NH	—	—	—
National Championships	Time trial	—	—	—	—	—	—	—	—	—	—	—	—	NH	—	1	5	8	17
National Championships	Road race	DNF	—	20	5	DNF	DNF	—	—	—	—	—	—	—	—	DNF	—	15	106

Legend
—	Did not compete
DNF	Did not finish
IP	In progress
NH	Not held
