= Luis Ángel Maté =

Spanish road racing cyclist

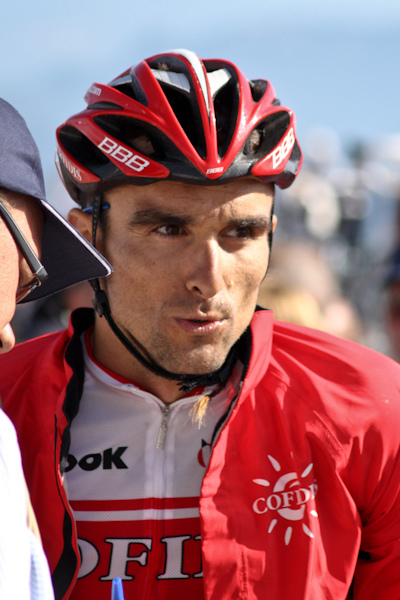
- Maté at the 2011 Tour de l'Ain

Personal information
- Full name: Luis Ángel Maté Mardones
- Born: 23 March 1984 (age 42) Marbella, Spain
- Height: 1.78 m (5 ft 10 in)
- Weight: 72 kg (159 lb; 11.3 st)

Cycling career
- Sport: Cycling
- Current team: Euskaltel–Euskadi
- Disciplines: Road; Gravel
- Role: Rider
- Rider type: Climber

Amateur teams
- 2005: Avila Rojas
- 2007: Andalucía–Cajasur

Professional teams
- 2008: Andalucía–Cajasur
- 2009–2010: Diquigiovanni–Androni
- 2011–2020: Cofidis
- 2021–: Euskaltel–Euskadi

Luis Ángel Maté Mardones (born 23 March 1984) is a Spanish professional road and gravel cyclist, who rides for UCI ProTeam Euskaltel–Euskadi.

Born in Marbella, Maté has competed as a professional since 2008, competing for Andalucía–Cajasur and Androni Giocattoli prior to moving to Cofidis for the 2011 season. After ten seasons with Cofidis, Maté signed an initial two-year contract with Euskaltel–Euskadi, from the 2021 season. He extended his stay with the team into 2023, winning a stage at the Volta a Portugal.

== Major results ==
2005
1st Stage 5a Circuito Montañés
2007
1st Stage 5 Circuito Montañés
2009
5th Prueba Villafranca de Ordizia
9th Gran Premio Industria e Commercio Artigianato Carnaghese
2010 (1 pro win)
1st Stage 6 Tour de San Luis
7th Gran Premio Città di Camaiore
9th Trofeo Melinda
2011 (1)
1st Stage 4 Route du Sud
2012
Vuelta a Andalucía

1st Mountains classification
1st Sprints classification

2013
5th Vuelta a Murcia
2014
2nd Grand Prix de Plumelec-Morbihan
4th Vuelta a Murcia
8th Clásica de Almería
10th Overall Vuelta a Andalucía
Combativity award Stage 6 Tour de France
2015
6th Grand Prix de Plumelec-Morbihan
2016
9th Overall Route du Sud
Vuelta a España

Combativity award Stages 7, 10 & 16

2017
6th Overall Tour de Luxembourg
Vuelta a España

Combativity award Stages 7 & 14

2018
Vuelta a España

Held after Stages 2–16
Combativity award Stages 2 & 4

2021
1st Mountains classification, Vuelta a Andalucía
6th Overall Volta a la Comunitat Valenciana
8th Overall Troféu Joaquim Agostinho
2022
Combativity award Stage 16 Vuelta a España
2023 (1)
5th Overall Volta a Portugal

1st Stage 6

2024 (1)
Volta a Portugal

1st Mountains classification
1st Stage 4

Vuelta a España

Held after Stage 3
Combativity award Stage 2

=== Grand Tour general classification results timeline ===
Grand Tour	2011	2012	2013	2014	2015	2016	2017	2018	2019	2020	2021	2022
Giro d'Italia	Has not contested during his career											
Tour de France	—	130	88	31	43	55	56	—	—	—	—	—
Vuelta a España	63	47	42	19	—	22	24	106	102	23	30	62

Legend
—	Did not compete
DNF	Did not finish
