= 2015 Clásica de San Sebastián =

Cycling race

2015 UCI World Tour, race 19 of 28

Race details
- Dates: 1 August 2015
- Stages: 1
- Distance: 219 km (136.1 mi)
- Winning time: 5h 30' 22"

Results
	Winner	Adam Yates (GBR)	(Orica–GreenEDGE)
	Second	Philippe Gilbert (BEL)	(BMC Racing Team)
	Third	Alejandro Valverde (ESP)	(Movistar Team)

The 2015 Clásica de San Sebastián was a one-day cycling classic that took place in the Basque Country in Spain on 1 August 2015. It was the 35th edition of the Clásica de San Sebastián and was the nineteenth race of the 2015 UCI World Tour. The defending champion was Alejandro Valverde (Movistar Team), who won a solo victory in the 2014 race.

The race took place in and around the city of San Sebastián and was 219 kilometres (136 mi) in length. The principal difficulty in the race was the sequence of climbs in the final part of the course. Adam Yates (Orica–GreenEDGE) attacked on the final climb, the Bordako Tontorra. Greg Van Avermaet (BMC Racing Team) was leading the race at the time, but he was hit by a race motorbike, forcing him out of the race. Yates went on to win a solo victory, 15 seconds ahead of the chasing group, becoming the first British rider to win the race. Valverde came third behind Philippe Gilbert (BMC).

== Route ==
The race began in San Sebastián with a 3.7 kilometres (2.3 mi) neutral zone and left the city to the west, along the coast of the Bay of Biscay. After 22.6 kilometres (14.0 mi), in Zarautz, the course turned to the south for another 24 kilometres (15 mi) to come to Azpeitia. Here the route turned to the east and began climbing towards the first categorised climb of the day. The road gradually climbed for over 13 kilometres (8.1 mi), but only the final 3.5 kilometres (2.2 mi) were categorised. This section of road, the Alto de Iturburu, had an average gradient of 5% and was a first-category climb. The summit of the climb came after 59.5 kilometres (37.0 mi).

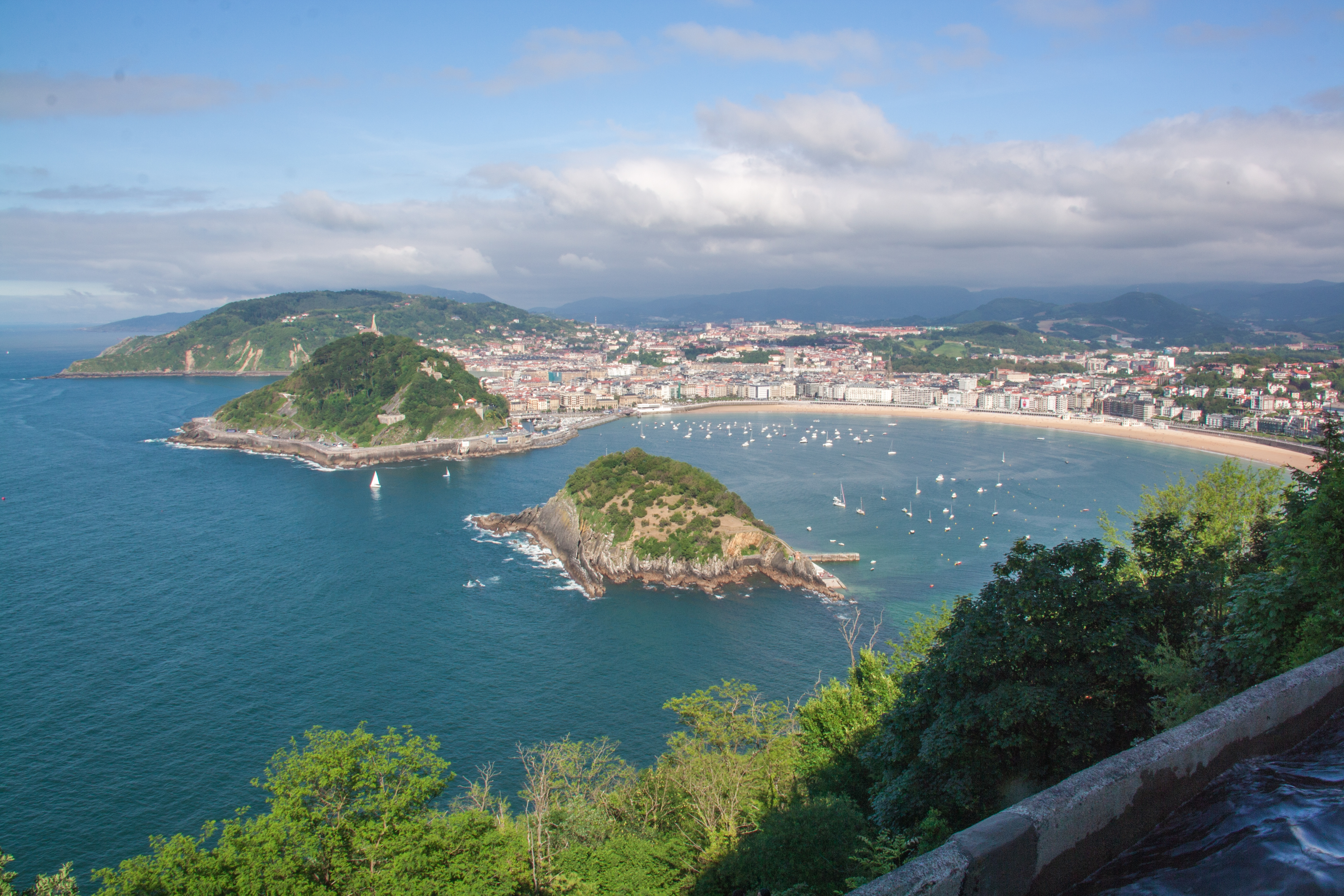
The city of San Sebastián from the summit of the Bordako Tontorra, the final climb of the race

After the descent, there was a fairly flat section of the course. This took the riders northeast for approximately 60 kilometres (37 mi) through Hernani, Oiartzun and Lezo before the first of two ascents of the Alto de Jaizkibel. This was also a first-category climb; it was 7.8 kilometres (4.8 mi) in length at an average gradient of 5.8%. The summit of the climb came after 125 kilometres (78 mi), with 94 kilometres (58 mi) to go to the finish. There was then a descent and a fairly flat 20-kilometre (12 mi) section of road through Irun. The next climb was the second-category Alto Arkale. This was 2.7 kilometres (1.7 mi) at 6.3%; the summit came with 71.2 kilometres (44.2 mi) remaining. The descent took the riders through Oiartzun and then into a second loop through the climbs of the Alto de Jaizkibel and the Alto Arkale. At the second summit of the Alto Arkale, there were 30.8 kilometres (19.1 mi) remaining to the finish line.

The next section of the course was 20 kilometres (12 mi) of fairly flat roads. During this section of the race, the riders returned to San Sebastián and crossed the finish line; at this point there were still 16 kilometres (9.9 mi) remaining. The riders left the town again to face the final climb of the day, the second-category Bordako Tontorra. This was a 2.5-kilometre (1.6 mi) climb at 9%; at the summit there were 7.1 kilometres (4.4 mi) of descent and then flat roads to the finish. The final climb was introduced in the 2014 edition and included gradients up to 20%; the lead group was formed on this ascent in the 2014 race, with Alejandro Valverde attacking on the descent and maintaining a gap to the finish line.

== Teams ==
As the Clásica de San Sebastián is a UCI World Tour event, all seventeen UCI WorldTeams were invited automatically and obliged to send a squad. Two UCI Professional Continental teams, Caja Rural–Seguros RGA and Cofidis, were given wildcard places to form a nineteen-team peloton. Seventeen teams started the race with eight riders; Team Sky and LottoNL–Jumbo started the race with seven men. There were therefore 150 riders in the peloton at the start of the race.

UCI WorldTeams

- AG2R La Mondiale
- Astana
- BMC Racing Team
- Etixx–Quick-Step
- FDJ
- IAM Cycling
- Lampre–Merida
- Lotto–Soudal
- Movistar Team
- Orica–GreenEDGE
- Cannondale–Garmin
- Team Giant–Alpecin
- Team Katusha
- LottoNL–Jumbo
- Team Sky
- Tinkoff–Saxo
- Trek Factory Racing

UCI Professional Continental teams

- Cofidis
- Caja Rural–Seguros RGA

== Pre-race favourites ==
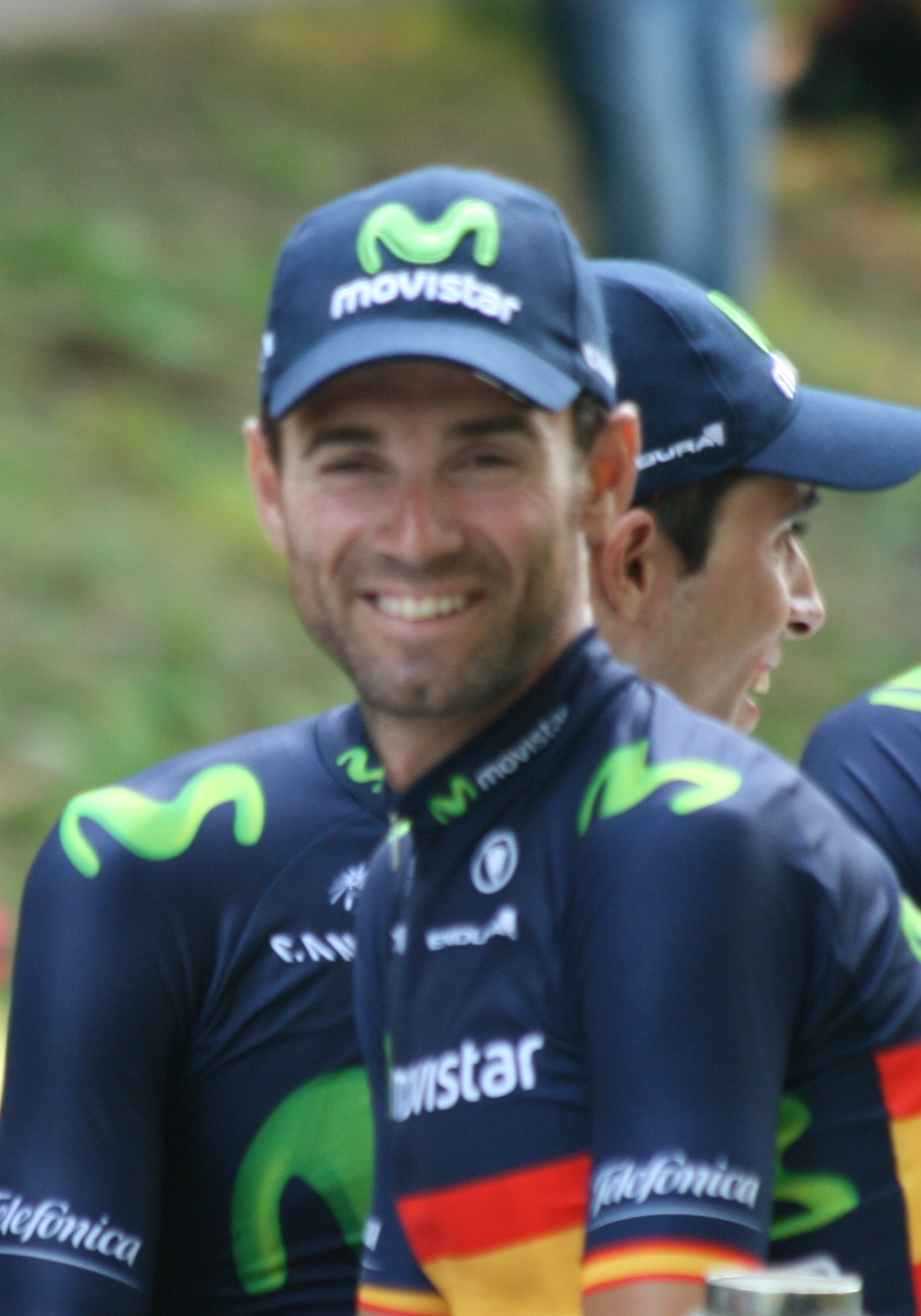
The winner of the 2014 edition Alejandro Valverde was considered the favourite for victory.

The Clásica de San Sebastián is the most important one-day race in Spain. It comes a week after the conclusion of the Tour de France. Some riders, including Chris Froome (Team Sky), the winner of the Tour, chose not to participate in the race. Riders also arrived from the Tour in a variety of conditions: some were in good form, while others were exhausted. Another of the principal riders from the Tour de France, Alberto Contador (Tinkoff–Saxo), originally planned to participate but was forced to withdraw because of a fever.

The principal favourite for the race was Alejandro Valverde (Movistar Team), who was third in the Tour de France. Valverde was the defending champion in the Clásica de San Sebastián, having won the 2014 edition with an attack on the final descent; he had also won the 2008 race from a small group sprint. As well as his podium place at the Tour, Valverde had also won La Flèche Wallonne and the Liège–Bastogne–Liège in 2015. The other principal favourite was Joaquim Rodríguez (Team Katusha). Rodríguez won two stages during the Tour and was expected to be in fresh condition, as he did not attempt a high position in the general classification.

Several other riders were considered to have a strong chance of victory. These included Philippe Gilbert (BMC Racing Team), the winner in 2011, Mikel Landa (Astana), who had been third in the Giro d'Italia, and Julian Alaphilippe (Etixx–Quick-Step), who had finished second to Valverde in both La Flèche Wallonne and Liège–Bastogne–Liège.

== Race report ==
A breakaway of eight riders formed in the early part of the race. These were Manuele Boaro (Tinkoff–Saxo), Valerio Agnoli (Astana), Dennis Vanendert (Lotto–Soudal), Nathan Haas (Cannondale–Garmin), Maarten Wynants (LottoNL–Jumbo), Thomas Degand (IAM Cycling), Lluís Mas (Caja Rural–Seguros RGA) and Romain Hardy (Cofidis). These riders stayed together for approximately 160 kilometres (99 mi); the Movistar Team controlled the peloton and kept the breakaway's lead to around three minutes. Boaro attacked the group on the second climb of the Alto de Jaizkibel and opened a gap on the other riders, but he was too far from the finish to make a solo attack last to the finish of the race.

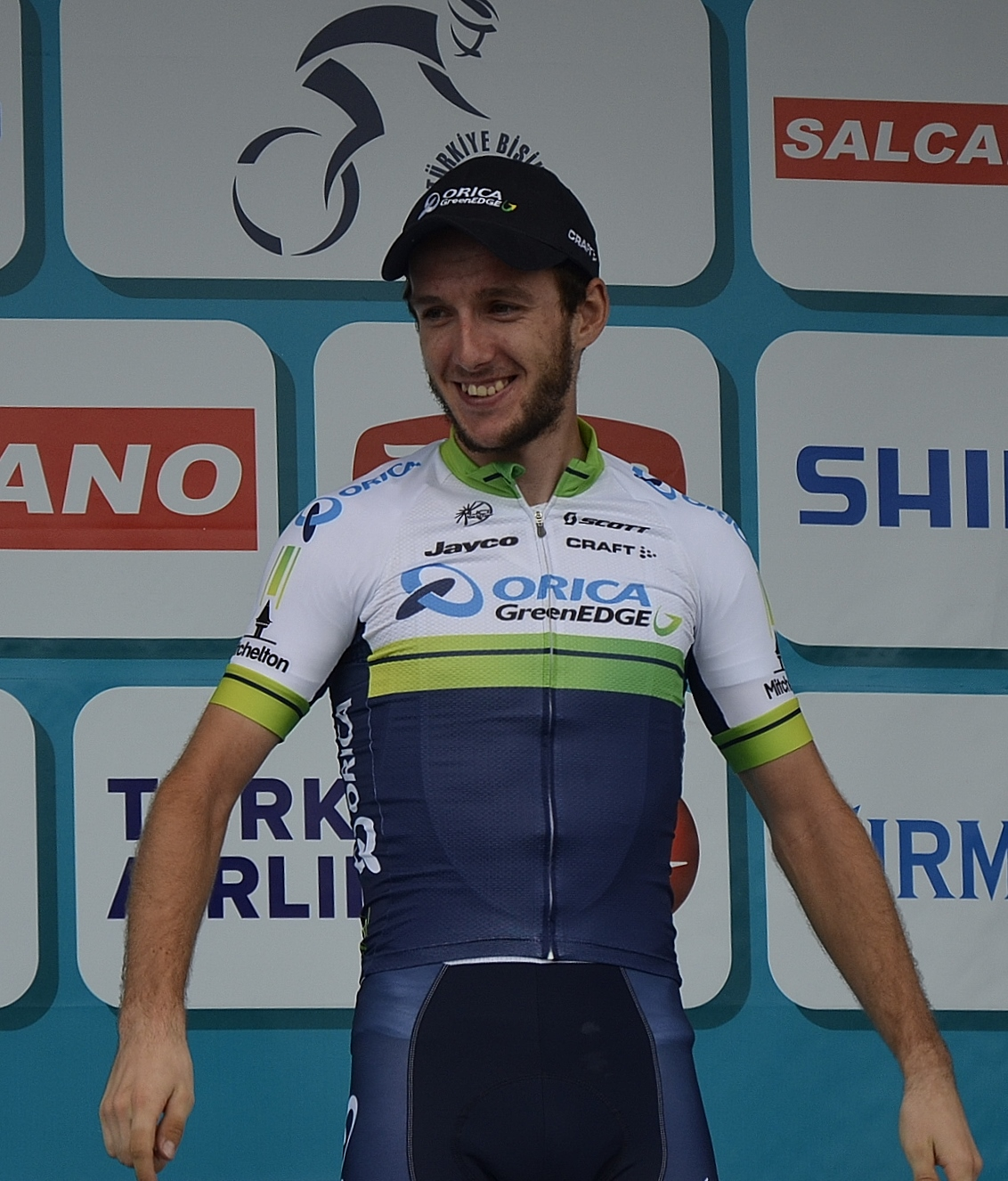
Adam Yates (Orica–GreenEDGE) (photographed in 2014) won the race after an attack on the final climb

On the final climb of the Alto de Jaizkibel, there were several attacks in the main peloton. These attacks came together on the penultimate climb of the day, the Alto Arkale, to form a sixteen-rider lead group. This group included Warren Barguil (Giant-Alpecin), Dan Martin (Cannondale-Garmin), Philippe Gilbert and Greg Van Avermaet (both BMC Racing Team), Alejandro Valverde (Movistar Team), Joaquim Rodríguez (Team Katusha) and Adam Yates (Orica–GreenEDGE). There was significant confusion on the final climb: the last riders from the early breakaway were being caught and the television coverage failed, so the teams were relying on race radio to follow the riders' positions.

The first attacks on the final climb came from Barguil and Van Avermaet, followed by Yates, while Rodríguez and Valverde waited in the main group. Yates passed Barguil and was chasing Van Avermaet, who was in the lead of the race. Towards the top of the climb, however, Van Avermaet was hit from behind by one of the motorbikes providing television coverage of the race. He was knocked to the ground and the frame of the bike was broken; Van Avermaet was unable to finish the race. Yates therefore led the race alone at the top of the final climb as the race descended into San Sebastián. Unlike in the 2014 race, when he had crashed out of the lead group on the final descent, Yates extended his lead to 15 seconds as the road flattened out and was able to keep this advantage to the end of the race. As he crossed the finish line, Yates was unaware that he had won the race, as he believed that the initial breakaway had not been caught. It took some time for the message to come through from his team that he had won. In the group behind, Gilbert sprinted to second place ahead of Valverde.

Yates's victory was the first UCI World Tour victory of his career and the first ever victory by a British rider in the Clásica de San Sebastián. Van Avermaet and the BMC team, however, were unhappy with the crash that had eliminated him from the race and issued a statement from Jim Ochowicz, the team's manager, saying that "Greg was robbed and the BMC Racing Team was robbed" and that the team would "explore every legal option". Simon Yates – Adam's brother and his teammate at Orica–GreenEDGE – described these comments as "quite disrespectful"; Van Avermaet later clarified that he considered Yates's victory well-deserved. The race organisers later wrote to Van Avermaet apologising for the incident; Van Avermaet was unable to read the letter, however, as it was written in Spanish.

== Results ==
	Cyclist	Team	Time	UCI World Tour Points
1	Adam Yates (GBR)	Orica–GreenEDGE	5h 30' 22"	80
2	Philippe Gilbert (BEL)	BMC Racing Team	+ 15"	60
3	Alejandro Valverde (ESP)	Movistar Team	+ 15"	50
4	Daniel Moreno (ESP)	Team Katusha	+ 15"	40
5	Joaquim Rodríguez (ESP)	Team Katusha	+ 15"	30
6	Bauke Mollema (NED)	Trek Factory Racing	+ 15"	22
7	Dan Martin (IRL)	Cannondale–Garmin	+ 15"	14
8	Julian Alaphilippe (FRA)	Etixx–Quick-Step	+ 15"	10
9	Warren Barguil (FRA)	Team Giant–Alpecin	+ 15"	6
10	Rigoberto Urán (COL)	Etixx–Quick-Step	+ 15"	2
Source: ProCyclingStats
