= Daniel Navarro =

Spanish road bicycle racer

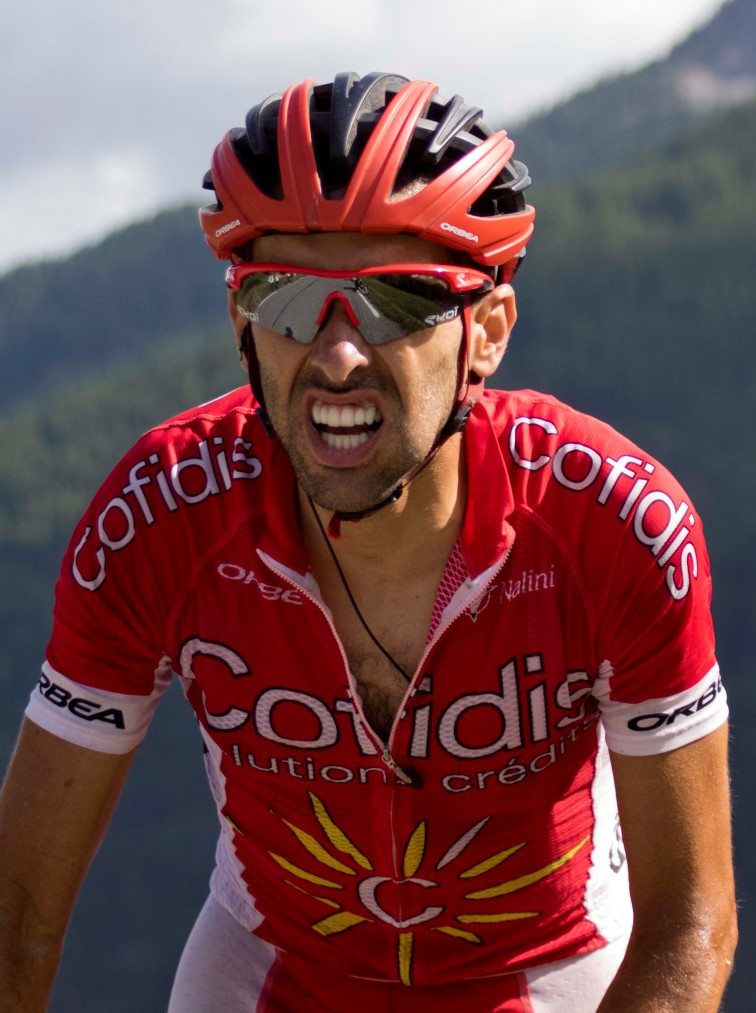
- Navarro at the 2017 Tour de France

Personal information
- Full name: Daniel Navarro García
- Born: 18 July 1983 (age 43) Salamanca, Spain
- Height: 1.74 m (5 ft 8 1/2 in)
- Weight: 60 kg (132 lb; 9 st 6 lb)

Cycling career
- Sport: Cycling
- Discipline: Road
- Role: Rider
- Rider type: Climber

Professional teams
- 2005–2006: Liberty Seguros–Würth
- 2007–2010: Astana
- 2011–2012: Saxo Bank–SunGard
- 2013–2018: Cofidis
- 2019: Team Katusha–Alpecin
- 2020: Israel Start-Up Nation
- 2021–2023: Burgos BH

Major wins
- Grand Tours Vuelta a España 1 individual stage (2014)

Daniel Navarro García (born 18 July 1983) is a Spanish former professional road bicycle racer, who competed as a professional from 2005 to 2023.

== Career ==
Navarro was born in Salamanca. Having been one of Alberto Contador's domestiques for most of his career, he left Saxo Bank–Tinkoff Bank at the end of the 2012 season, and joined Cofidis on a two-year contract from the 2013 season onwards. In 2013, Navarro won the Vuelta a Murcia and later had his first top ten grand tour finish, finishing 9th overall in the Tour de France. He had to abandon the 2014 Tour de France due to some intense stomach pain. At the 2014 Vuelta a España, he obtained the biggest victory of his career on Stage 13, a medium-mountain stage. He went on to finish 10th overall that year.

In August 2018, after six years away from the World Tour, Team Katusha–Alpecin announced that they had signed Navarro on a two-year deal from 2019, with a role as a climbing domestique for Ilnur Zakarin as well as having the opportunity to ride for himself on occasions. Team Katusha–Alpecin folded at the end of 2019, but the second year of Navarro's contract was honoured by Israel Start-Up Nation, who took over the UCI WorldTeam licence. He left the team following the 2020 season, remaining without a team until the following March, when he signed for Burgos BH. He remained with the team through to 2023, when he announced his retirement from the sport.

== Major results ==
2001
2nd Road race, National Junior Road Championships
2004
5th Overall Circuito Montañés
2008
4th Overall Deutschland Tour
5th Overall Volta a Catalunya
2009
7th Gran Premio di Lugano
9th Overall Tour de l'Ain
2010
1st Stage 5 Critérium du Dauphiné
2012
3rd Overall Tour de l'Ain

1st Stage 3

3rd Overall Tour Méditerranéen
2013
1st Vuelta a Murcia
5th Overall Critérium du Dauphiné
9th Overall Tour de France
10th Overall Vuelta a Andalucía
2014
8th Overall Vuelta a Andalucía
9th Overall Critérium du Dauphiné
10th Overall Vuelta a España

1st Stage 13

10th Vuelta a Murcia
2016
9th Overall Vuelta a Andalucía
9th Overall Volta a la Comunitat Valenciana
9th Vuelta a Murcia
2017
8th Boucles de l'Aulne
Combativity award Stage 19 Vuelta a España
2018
2nd Overall Route d'Occitanie
7th Overall Tour of Oman
9th Overall Critérium du Dauphiné
2021
10th Overall Volta ao Algarve
Combativity award Stage 14 Vuelta a España
2023
1st Stage 1a (TTT) GP Beiras e Serra da Estrela

=== Grand Tour general classification results timeline ===
Grand Tour	2006	2007	2008	2009	2010	2011	2012	2013	2014	2015	2016	2017	2018	2019	2020	2021	2022	2023
Giro d'Italia	90	—	—	30	—	43	—	—	—	—	—	—	—	DNF	48	—	—	—
Tour de France	—	DNF	—	—	48	63	—	9	DNF	66	DNF	27	45	—	—	—	—	—
/ Vuelta a España	—	—	—	13	—	—	55	—	10	30	—	81	—	40	—	24	44	39

Legend
—	Did not compete
DNF	Did not finish
