= 2013 Vuelta a Murcia =

Race details
- Dates: 23 February 2013
- Stages: 1
- Distance: 182.5 km (113.4 mi)
- Winning time: 4h 40' 32"

Results
	Winner	Daniel Navarro (ESP)
	Second	Bauke Mollema (NED)
	Third	Alejandro Valverde (ESP)

The 2013 Vuelta a Murcia was the 29th edition of the Vuelta a Murcia cycle race and was held on 23 February 2013. The race started in Murcia and finished at the Castle of Lorca. The race was won by Daniel Navarro.

== General classification ==
Final general classification

Rank	Rider	Time
1	Daniel Navarro (ESP)	4h 40' 32"
2	Bauke Mollema (NED)	+ 0"
3	Alejandro Valverde (ESP)	+ 0"
4	Robert Gesink (NED)	+ 0"
5	Luis Ángel Maté (ESP)	+ 0"
6	Igor Antón (ESP)	+ 0"
7	Davide Rebellin (ITA)	+ 0"
8	Jakob Fuglsang (DEN)	+ 0"
9	Jonathan Hivert (FRA)	+ 0"
10	Enzo Moyano (ARG)	+ 0"
