= 2013 La Flèche Wallonne =

2013 UCI World Tour, race 12 of 28
- Event poster

Race details
- Dates: 17 April 2013
- Stages: 1
- Distance: 205 km (127.4 mi)
- Winning time: 4h 52' 33"

Results
	Winner	Daniel Moreno (ESP)	(Team Katusha)
	Second	Sergio Henao (COL)	(Team Sky)
	Third	Carlos Betancur (COL)	(Ag2r–La Mondiale)

The 2013 La Flèche Wallonne was the 77th running of La Flèche Wallonne, a single-day cycling race. It was held on 17 April 2013 over a distance of 205 kilometres (127.4 miles) and it was the twelfth race of the 2013 UCI World Tour season.

== Teams ==
As La Flèche Wallonne is a UCI World Tour event, all 19 UCI ProTeams were automatically invited and obligated to send a squad. Six other squads were given wildcard places into the race, and as such, formed the event's 25-team peloton.

The 19 UCI ProTeams that competed in the race:

- Ag2r–La Mondiale
- Argos–Shimano
- Astana
- Blanco Pro Cycling
- BMC Racing Team
- Cannondale
- Euskaltel–Euskadi
- FDJ
- Garmin–Sharp
- Orica–GreenEDGE
- Team Katusha
- Lampre–Merida
- Lotto–Belisol
- Movistar Team
- Omega Pharma–Quick-Step
- RadioShack–Leopard
- Saxo–Tinkoff
- Team Sky
- Vacansoleil–DCM

The 6 teams who were given wild cards:

- Accent Jobs–Wanty
- Colombia
- Crelan–Euphony
- IAM Cycling
- Sojasun
- Topsport Vlaanderen–Baloise

== Results ==
	Cyclist	Team	Time	World Tour Points
1	Daniel Moreno (ESP)	Team Katusha	4h 52' 33"	80
2	Sergio Henao (COL)	Team Sky	+ 3"	60
3	Carlos Betancur (COL)	Ag2r–La Mondiale	+ 3"	50
4	Dan Martin (IRL)	Garmin–Sharp	+ 3"	40
5	Michal Kwiatkowski (POL)	Omega Pharma–Quick-Step	+ 3"	30
6	Joaquim Rodríguez (ESP)	Team Katusha	+ 8"	22
7	Alejandro Valverde (ESP)	Movistar Team	+ 8"	14
8	Igor Antón (ESP)	Euskaltel–Euskadi	+ 8"	10
9	Bauke Mollema (NED)	Blanco Pro Cycling	+ 8"	6
10	Rinaldo Nocentini (ITA)	Ag2r–La Mondiale	+ 8"	2
