= 2019 Milano–Torino =

100th edition of the Milano–Torino cycling classic

2019 UCI Europe Tour

Race details
- Dates: 9 October 2019
- Distance: 179 km (111.2 mi)
- Winning time: 4h 03' 48"

Results
	Winner	Michael Woods (CAN)	(EF Education First)
	Second	Alejandro Valverde (ESP)	(Movistar Team)
	Third	Adam Yates (GBR)	(Mitchelton–Scott)

The 2019 Milano–Torino was the 100th edition of the Milano–Torino cycling classic. It was held on 9 October 2019 over a distance of 179 km (111 mi) between Magenta and Turin. The race was rated as a 1.HC event on the 2019 UCI Europe Tour. The race was won by Canadian rider Michael Woods of EF Education First.

== Results ==
Result
Rank	Rider	Team	Time
1	Michael Woods (CAN)	EF Education First	4h 03' 48"
2	Alejandro Valverde (ESP)	Movistar Team	+ 0"
3	Adam Yates (GBR)	Mitchelton–Scott	+ 5"
4	Tiesj Benoot (BEL)	Lotto–Soudal	+ 10"
5	David Gaudu (FRA)	Groupama–FDJ	+ 10"
6	Egan Bernal (COL)	Team Ineos	+ 10"
7	Bauke Mollema (NED)	Trek–Segafredo	+ 23"
8	Jakob Fuglsang (DEN)	Astana	+ 33"
9	Kevin Rivera (CRC)	Androni Giocattoli–Sidermec	+ 33"
10	Enric Mas (ESP)	Deceuninck–Quick-Step	+ 38"
