= 2022 Clásica de San Sebastián =

2022 UCI World Tour, race 24 of 31

Race details
- Dates: 30 July 2022
- Stages: 1
- Distance: 224.8 km (139.7 mi)
- Winning time: 5h 31' 44"

Results
	Winner	Remco Evenepoel (BEL)	(Quick-Step Alpha Vinyl Team)
	Second	Pavel Sivakov (FRA)	(Ineos Grenadiers)
	Third	Tiesj Benoot (BEL)	(Team Jumbo–Visma)

The 2022 Clásica de San Sebastián was a road cycling one-day race that took place on 30 July 2022 in San Sebastián, Spain. It was the 41st edition of the Clásica de San Sebastián and the 24th event of the 2022 UCI World Tour.

The pre-race favourites included Remco Evenepoel and Tadej Pogačar, with the field split between riders looking to carry their Tour de France form into the event, and others using the race to build toward events later in the year. The race began on flat terrain, with the second half of the route mountainous and favouring those riders stronger at climbing.

== Teams ==
All the 18 UCI WorldTeams and five UCI ProTeams made up the twenty-three teams that participated in the race. Intermarché–Wanty–Gobert Matériaux, Team Jumbo–Visma, Israel–Premier Tech, Groupama–FDJ and Bora–Hansgrohe, with six riders, are the only teams to not enter a full squad of seven riders.

UCI WorldTeams

- AG2R Citroën Team
- Astana Qazaqstan Team
- Bora–Hansgrohe
- Cofidis
- EF Education–EasyPost
- Groupama–FDJ
- Ineos Grenadiers
- Intermarché–Wanty–Gobert Matériaux
- Israel–Premier Tech
- Lotto–Soudal
- Movistar Team
- Quick-Step Alpha Vinyl Team
- Team Bahrain Victorious
- Team BikeExchange–Jayco
- Team DSM
- Team Jumbo–Visma
- Trek–Segafredo
- UAE Team Emirates

UCI Professional Continental Teams

- Burgos BH
- Caja Rural–Seguros RGA
- Equipo Kern Pharma
- Euskaltel–Euskadi
- Team TotalEnergies

== Result ==
Result
Rank	Rider	Team	Time
1	Remco Evenepoel (BEL)	Quick-Step Alpha Vinyl Team	5h 31' 44"
2	Pavel Sivakov (FRA)	Ineos Grenadiers	+ 1' 58"
3	Tiesj Benoot (BEL)	Team Jumbo–Visma	+ 2' 31"
4	Bauke Mollema (NED)	Trek–Segafredo	+ 3' 11"
5	Carlos Rodríguez (ESP)	Ineos Grenadiers	+ 3' 11"
6	Simon Yates (GBR)	Team BikeExchange–Jayco	+ 3' 28"
7	Toms Skujiņš (LAT)	Trek–Segafredo	+ 4' 09"
8	Mattias Skjelmose Jensen (DEN)	Trek–Segafredo	+ 4' 09"
9	Rigoberto Urán (COL)	EF Education–EasyPost	+ 4' 09"
10	Lorenzo Rota (ITA)	Intermarché–Wanty–Gobert Matériaux	+ 4' 09"
