= 2016 Clásica de San Sebastián =

2016 UCI World Tour, race 20 of 28

Race details
- Dates: 30 July 2016
- Stages: 1
- Winning time: 5h 31' 01"

Results
| | Winner | Bauke Mollema (NED) | (Trek–Segafredo) |
| | Second | Tony Gallopin (FRA) | (Lotto–Soudal) |
| | Third | Alejandro Valverde (ESP) | (Movistar Team) |

The 2016 Clásica de San Sebastián was the 36th edition of the Clásica de San Sebastián road bicycle race. The race took place on 30 July 2016. It was won by Dutch rider Bauke Mollema.

== Teams ==
The 18 UCI World Tour teams are automatically entitled and obliged to start the race. The race organization handed out wildcards to two UCI Professional Continental teams, Caja Rural–Seguros RGA and Cofidis, Solutions Crédits.

World Tour teams

- AG2R La Mondiale
- Astana
- BMC Racing Team
- Team Dimension Data
- Etixx–Quick-Step
- FDJ
- IAM Cycling
- Lampre–Merida
- Lotto–Soudal
- Movistar Team
- Team Giant–Alpecin
- Team Katusha
- LottoNL–Jumbo
- Team Sky
- Tinkoff
- Trek–Segafredo
- Orica–BikeExchange
- Orica–BikeExchange

== Results ==
| | Cyclist | Team | Time | UCI World Tour Points |
|---|---|---|---|---|
| 1 | Bauke Mollema (NED) | Trek–Segafredo | 5h 31' 01" | 80 |
| 2 | Tony Gallopin (FRA) | Lotto–Soudal | + 16" | 60 |
| 3 | Alejandro Valverde (ESP) | Movistar Team | + 16" | 50 |
| 4 | Joaquim Rodríguez (ESP) | Team Katusha | + 22" | 40 |
| 5 | Greg Van Avermaet (BEL) | BMC Racing Team | + 34" | 30 |
| 6 | Gianluca Brambilla (ITA) | Etixx–Quick-Step | + 34" | 22 |
| 7 | Simon Yates (GBR) | Orica–BikeExchange | + 34" | 14 |
| 8 | Tom-Jelte Slagter (NED) | Cannondale–Drapac | + 34" | 10 |
| 9 | Nicolas Roche (IRL) | Team Sky | + 34" | 6 |
| 10 | Dries Devenyns (BEL) | IAM Cycling | + 37" | 2 |
Source: ProCyclingStats
