= 2014 Amstel Gold Race =

2014 UCI World Tour, race 11 of 28

Race details
- Dates: 20 April 2014
- Stages: 1
- Distance: 251 km (156.0 mi)
- Winning time: 6h 25' 57"

Results
	Winner	Philippe Gilbert (BEL)	(BMC Racing Team)
	Second	Jelle Vanendert (BEL)	(Lotto–Belisol)
	Third	Simon Gerrans (AUS)	(Orica–GreenEDGE)

The 2014 Amstel Gold Race was the 49th running of the Amstel Gold Race, a single-day cycling race. It was held on 20 April 2014 over a distance of 251 kilometres (156.0 miles) and it was the eleventh race of the 2014 UCI World Tour season. It was won for the third time by Belgium's Philippe Gilbert, ahead of countryman Jelle Vanendert and Australia's Simon Gerrans.

== Teams ==
As the Amstel Gold Race was a UCI World Tour event, all 18 UCI ProTeams were invited automatically and obligated to send a squad. Six other squads were given wildcard places, thus completing the 24-team peloton.

The 24 teams competed in the race were:

- Ag2r–La Mondiale
- Androni Giocattoli–Venezuela
- Astana
- Bardiani–CSF
- Belkin Pro Cycling
- BMC Racing Team
- Cannondale
- CCC–Polsat–Polkowice
- Team Europcar
- FDJ.fr
- Garmin–Sharp
- Giant–Shimano
- IAM Cycling
- Team Katusha
- Lampre–Merida
- Lotto–Belisol
- Movistar Team
- Omega Pharma–Quick-Step
- Orica–GreenEDGE
- Team Sky
- Tinkoff–Saxo
- Topsport Vlaanderen–Baloise
- Trek Factory Racing
- Wanty–Groupe Gobert

== Results ==
	Rider	Team	Time	World Tour Points
1	Philippe Gilbert (BEL)	BMC Racing Team	6h 25' 57"	80
2	Jelle Vanendert (BEL)	Lotto–Belisol	+ 5"	60
3	Simon Gerrans (AUS)	Orica–GreenEDGE	+ 6"	50
4	Alejandro Valverde (ESP)	Movistar Team	+ 6"	40
5	Michał Kwiatkowski (POL)	Omega Pharma–Quick-Step	+ 6"	30
6	Simon Geschke (GER)	Giant–Shimano	+ 10"	22
7	Bauke Mollema (NED)	Belkin Pro Cycling	+ 10"	14
8	Enrico Gasparotto (ITA)	Astana	+ 10"	10
9	Daniel Moreno (ESP)	Team Katusha	+ 10"	6
10	Yukiya Arashiro (JPN)	Team Europcar	+ 12"	2
