= 2014 Vuelta a Andalucía =

Race details
- Dates: 19–23 February 2014
- Stages: 4 + Prologue
- Distance: 735.5 km (457.0 mi)
- Winning time: 18h 47' 45"

Results
	Winner	Alejandro Valverde (ESP)
	Second	Richie Porte (AUS)
	Third	Luis León Sánchez (ESP)

The 2014 Vuelta a Andalucía was the 60th edition of the Vuelta a Andalucía cycle race and was held on 19 February to 23 February 2014. The race started in Almería and finished in Fuengirola. The race was won by Alejandro Valverde.

== General classification ==
Final general classification

Rank	Rider	Time
1	Alejandro Valverde (ESP)	18h 47' 45"
2	Richie Porte (AUS)	+ 31"
3	Luis León Sánchez (ESP)	+ 33"
4	Ion Izagirre (ESP)	+ 33"
5	Tanel Kangert (EST)	+ 43"
6	Bauke Mollema (NED)	+ 55"
7	Thomas Degand (BEL)	+ 1' 02"
8	Daniel Navarro (ESP)	+ 1' 06"
9	Michele Scarponi (ITA)	+ 1' 13"
10	Luis Ángel Maté (ESP)	+ 1' 24"
