= 2022 Il Lombardia =

Cycling race

2022 UCI World Tour, race 31 of 31
- Official event poster

Race details
- Dates: 8 October 2022
- Stages: 1
- Distance: 253 km (157.2 mi)
- Winning time: 6h 21' 22"

Results
| | Winner | Tadej Pogačar (SLO) | (UAE Team Emirates) |
| | Second | Enric Mas (ESP) | (Movistar Team) |
| | Third | Mikel Landa (ESP) | (Team Bahrain Victorious) |

The 2022 Il Lombardia was a one-day road cycling race that took place on 8 October 2022 in the Italian region of Lombardy. It was the 31st and final event of the 2022 UCI World Tour and was the 116th edition of Il Lombardia.

== Teams ==
Twenty-five teams, consisting of 18 UCI WorldTeams and 7 UCI ProTeams, participated in the race. Each team entered seven riders.

UCI WorldTeams

- AG2R Citroën Team
- Astana Qazaqstan Team
- Bora–Hansgrohe
- Cofidis
- EF Education–EasyPost
- Groupama–FDJ
- Israel–Premier Tech
- Ineos Grenadiers
- Intermarché–Wanty–Gobert Matériaux
- Lotto–Soudal
- Movistar Team
- Quick-Step Alpha Vinyl Team
- Team Bahrain Victorious
- Team BikeExchange–Jayco
- Team DSM
- Team Jumbo–Visma
- Trek–Segafredo
- UAE Team Emirates

UCI ProTeams

- Alpecin–Deceuninck
- Arkéa–Samsic
- Bardiani–CSF–Faizanè
- Caja Rural–Seguros RGA
- Drone Hopper–Androni Giocattoli
- Eolo–Kometa
- Team TotalEnergies

== Results ==
Result
| Rank | Rider | Team | Time |
|---|---|---|---|
| 1 | Tadej Pogačar (SLO) | UAE Team Emirates | 6h 21' 22" |
| 2 | Enric Mas (ESP) | Movistar Team | + 0" |
| 3 | Mikel Landa (ESP) | Team Bahrain Victorious | + 10" |
| 4 | Sergio Higuita (COL) | Bora–Hansgrohe | + 52" |
| 5 | Carlos Rodríguez (ESP) | Ineos Grenadiers | + 52" |
| 6 | Alejandro Valverde (ESP) | Movistar Team | + 1' 24" |
| 7 | Bauke Mollema (NED) | Trek–Segafredo | + 1' 24" |
| 8 | Rudy Molard (FRA) | Groupama–FDJ | + 1' 24" |
| 9 | Romain Bardet (FRA) | Team DSM | + 1' 24" |
| 10 | Adam Yates (GBR) | Ineos Grenadiers | + 1' 26" |
