= 2022 Tre Valli Varesine =

- 2022 UCI ProSeries

Race details
- Dates: 4 October 2022
- Stages: 1
- Distance: 196.5 km (122.1 mi)
- Winning time: 4h 36' 59"

Results
	Winner	Tadej Pogačar (SLO)	(UAE Team Emirates)
	Second	Sergio Higuita (COL)	(Bora–Hansgrohe)
	Third	Alejandro Valverde (ESP)	(Movistar Team)

The 2022 Tre Valli Varesine was the 101st edition of the Tre Valli Varesine road cycling one day race, which was held in the Lombardy region of northwestern Italy on 4 October 2022. The race was the third of the 2022 Trittico Lombardo, which also included the Coppa Ugo Agostoni, held on 29 September and the Coppa Bernocchi held the day before.

== Teams ==
16 of the 19 UCI WorldTeams and nine UCI ProTeams made up the 25 teams that participated in the race. Lotto–Soudal, Team BikeExchange–Jayco and Team Jumbo–Visma, with six riders each, were the only teams to not enter a full squad of seven riders. In total, 171 riders started the race, of which only 101 finished.

UCI WorldTeams

- AG2R Citroën Team
- Astana Qazaqstan Team
- Bora–Hansgrohe
- Cofidis
- EF Education–EasyPost
- Groupama–FDJ
- INEOS Grenadiers
- Intermarché–Wanty–Gobert Matériaux
- Israel–Premier Tech
- Lotto–Soudal
- Movistar Team
- Team BikeExchange–Jayco
- Team DSM
- Team Jumbo–Visma
- Trek–Segafredo
- UAE Team Emirates

UCI ProTeams

- Alpecin–Deceuninck
- Arkéa–Samsic
- Bardiani–CSF–Faizanè
- Bingoal Pauwels Sauces WB
- Caja Rural–Seguros RGA
- Drone Hopper–Androni Giocattoli
- Eolo–Kometa
- Equipo Kern Pharma
- Team TotalEnergies

== Result ==
Result
Rank	Rider	Team	Time
1	Tadej Pogačar (SLO)	UAE Team Emirates	4h 36' 59"
2	Sergio Higuita (COL)	Bora–Hansgrohe	+ 0"
3	Alejandro Valverde (ESP)	Movistar Team	+ 0"
4	Pierre Latour (FRA)	Team TotalEnergies	+ 0"
5	Benoît Cosnefroy (FRA)	AG2R Citroën Team	+ 0"
6	Adam Yates (GBR)	INEOS Grenadiers	+ 0"
7	Bauke Mollema (NED)	Trek–Segafredo	+ 0"
8	Domenico Pozzovivo (ITA)	Intermarché–Wanty–Gobert Matériaux	+ 0"
9	Jesús Herrada (ESP)	Cofidis	+ 0"
10	Rigoberto Urán (COL)	EF Education–EasyPost	+ 0"
