= 2021 Liège–Bastogne–Liège =

Cycling race

2021 UCI World Tour, race 16 of 29

Race details
- Dates: 25 April 2021
- Stages: 1
- Distance: 259.5 km (161.2 mi)
- Winning time: 6h 39' 26"

Results
	Winner	Tadej Pogačar (SLO)	(UAE Team Emirates)
	Second	Julian Alaphilippe (FRA)	(Deceuninck–Quick-Step)
	Third	David Gaudu (FRA)	(Groupama–FDJ)

The 2021 Liège–Bastogne–Liège was a Belgian road cycling one-day race that took place on 25 April 2021. It was the 107th edition of Liège–Bastogne–Liège and the 16th event of the 2021 UCI World Tour, and was won by Tadej Pogačar.

== Teams ==
Twenty-five teams were invited to the race, including all nineteen UCI WorldTeams and six UCI ProTeams.

UCI WorldTeams

- AG2R Citroën Team
- Astana–Premier Tech
- Bora–Hansgrohe
- Cofidis
- Deceuninck–Quick-Step
- EF Education–Nippo
- Groupama–FDJ
- INEOS Grenadiers
- Intermarché–Wanty–Gobert Matériaux
- Israel Start-Up Nation
- Lotto–Soudal
- Movistar Team
- Team Bahrain Victorious
- Team BikeExchange
- Team DSM
- Team Jumbo–Visma
- Team Qhubeka Assos
- Trek–Segafredo
- UAE Team Emirates

UCI ProTeams

- Alpecin–Fenix
- Arkéa–Samsic
- Bingoal Pauwels Sauces WB
- Gazprom–RusVelo
- Sport Vlaanderen–Baloise
- Total Direct Énergie

== Result ==
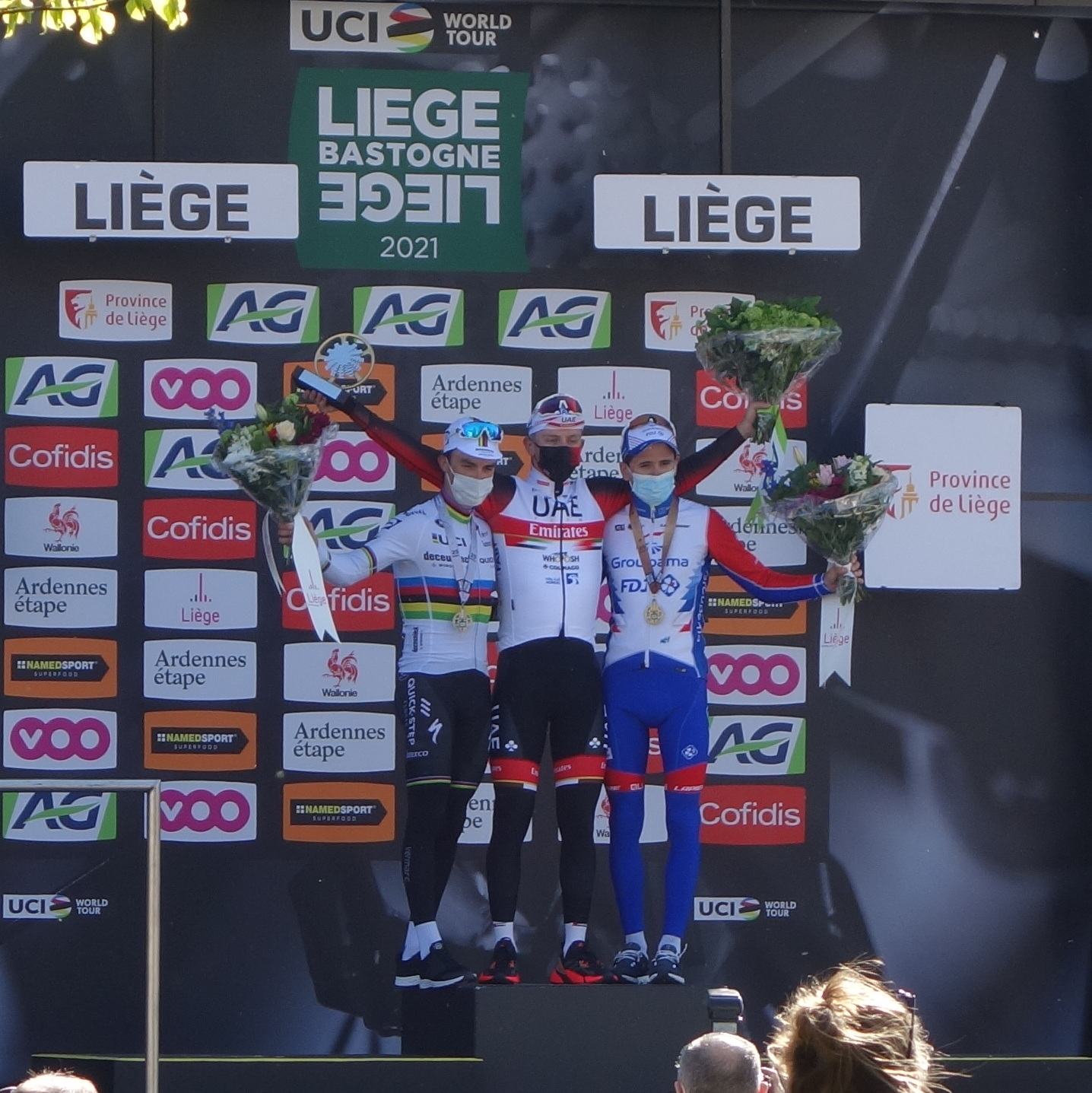
Winner Tadej Pogačar on the podium

Result
Rank	Rider	Team	Time
1	Tadej Pogačar (SLO)	UAE Team Emirates	6h 39' 26"
2	Julian Alaphilippe (FRA)	Deceuninck–Quick-Step	+ 0"
3	David Gaudu (FRA)	Groupama–FDJ	+ 0"
4	Alejandro Valverde (ESP)	Movistar Team	+ 0"
5	Michael Woods (CAN)	Israel Start-Up Nation	+ 0"
6	Marc Hirschi (SUI)	UAE Team Emirates	+ 7"
7	Tiesj Benoot (BEL)	Team DSM	+ 7"
8	Bauke Mollema (NED)	Trek–Segafredo	+ 7"
9	Maximilian Schachmann (GER)	Bora–Hansgrohe	+ 9"
10	Matej Mohorič (SLO)	Team Bahrain Victorious	+ 9"
