= 2013 Vuelta a Andalucía =

Race details
- Dates: 17–20 February 2013
- Stages: 3 + Prologue
- Distance: 546.8 km (339.8 mi)
- Winning time: 13h 47' 27"

Results
	Winner	Alejandro Valverde (ESP)
	Second	Jurgen Van den Broeck (BEL)
	Third	Bauke Mollema (NED)

The 2013 Vuelta a Andalucía was the 59th edition of the Vuelta a Andalucía cycle race and was held on 17 February to 20 February 2013. The race started in San Fernando and finished in Rincón de la Victoria. The race was won by Alejandro Valverde.

== General classification ==
Final general classification

Rank	Rider	Time
1	Alejandro Valverde (ESP)	13h 47' 27"
2	Jurgen Van den Broeck (BEL)	+ 7"
3	Bauke Mollema (NED)	+ 11"
4	Simon Špilak (SLO)	+ 12"
5	Bart De Clercq (BEL)	+ 17"
6	Jakob Fuglsang (DEN)	+ 19"
7	Nairo Quintana (COL)	+ 24"
8	Sander Armée (BEL)	+ 30"
9	Davide Rebellin (ITA)	+ 30"
10	Daniel Navarro (ESP)	+ 38"
