= 2019 Il Lombardia =

Cycling race

2019 UCI World Tour, race 37 of 38
- Official event poster

Race details
- Dates: 12 October 2019
- Stages: 1
- Distance: 243 km (151.0 mi)
- Winning time: 5h 52' 59"

Results
	Winner	Bauke Mollema (NED)	(Trek–Segafredo)
	Second	Alejandro Valverde (ESP)	(Movistar Team)
	Third	Egan Bernal (COL)	(Team Ineos)

The 2019 Il Lombardia was a road cycling one-day race that took place on 12 October 2019 in Italy. It was the 113th edition of Il Lombardia and the 37th event of the 2019 UCI World Tour. Bauke Mollema of Trek–Segafredo became the first Dutch winner of Il Lombardia since Hennie Kuiper's victory in 1981. Also, for the first time since 1990, there were no Italian riders in the top 10.

== Teams ==
Twenty-five teams, consisting of all 18 UCI WorldTour teams and 7 UCI Professional Continental teams, of seven riders participated in the race. Of the 175 riders that started the race, 109 riders finished.

UCI WorldTeams

- AG2R La Mondiale
- Astana
- Bahrain–Merida
- Bora–Hansgrohe
- CCC Team
- Deceuninck–Quick-Step
- EF Education First
- Groupama–FDJ
- Lotto–Soudal
- Mitchelton–Scott
- Movistar Team
- Team Dimension Data
- Team Ineos
- Team Jumbo–Visma
- Team Katusha–Alpecin
- Team Sunweb
- Trek–Segafredo
- UAE Team Emirates

UCI Professional Continental teams

- Androni Giocattoli–Sidermec
- Bardiani–CSF
- Cofidis
- Gazprom–RusVelo
- Israel Cycling Academy
- Neri Sottoli–Selle Italia–KTM
- Vital Concept–B&B Hotels

== Results ==
Result
Rank	Rider	Team	Time
1	Bauke Mollema (NED)	Trek–Segafredo	5h 52' 59"
2	Alejandro Valverde (ESP)	Movistar Team	+ 16"
3	Egan Bernal (COL)	Team Ineos	+ 16"
4	Jakob Fuglsang (DEN)	Astana	+ 16"
5	Michael Woods (CAN)	EF Education First	+ 34"
6	Jack Haig (AUS)	Mitchelton–Scott	+ 34"
7	Primož Roglič (SLO)	Team Jumbo–Visma	+ 34"
8	Emanuel Buchmann (GER)	Bora–Hansgrohe	+ 52"
9	Pierre Latour (FRA)	AG2R La Mondiale	+ 52"
10	Rudy Molard (FRA)	Groupama–FDJ	+ 52"
