= 2019 Clásica de San Sebastián =

2019 UCI World Tour, race 28 of 39
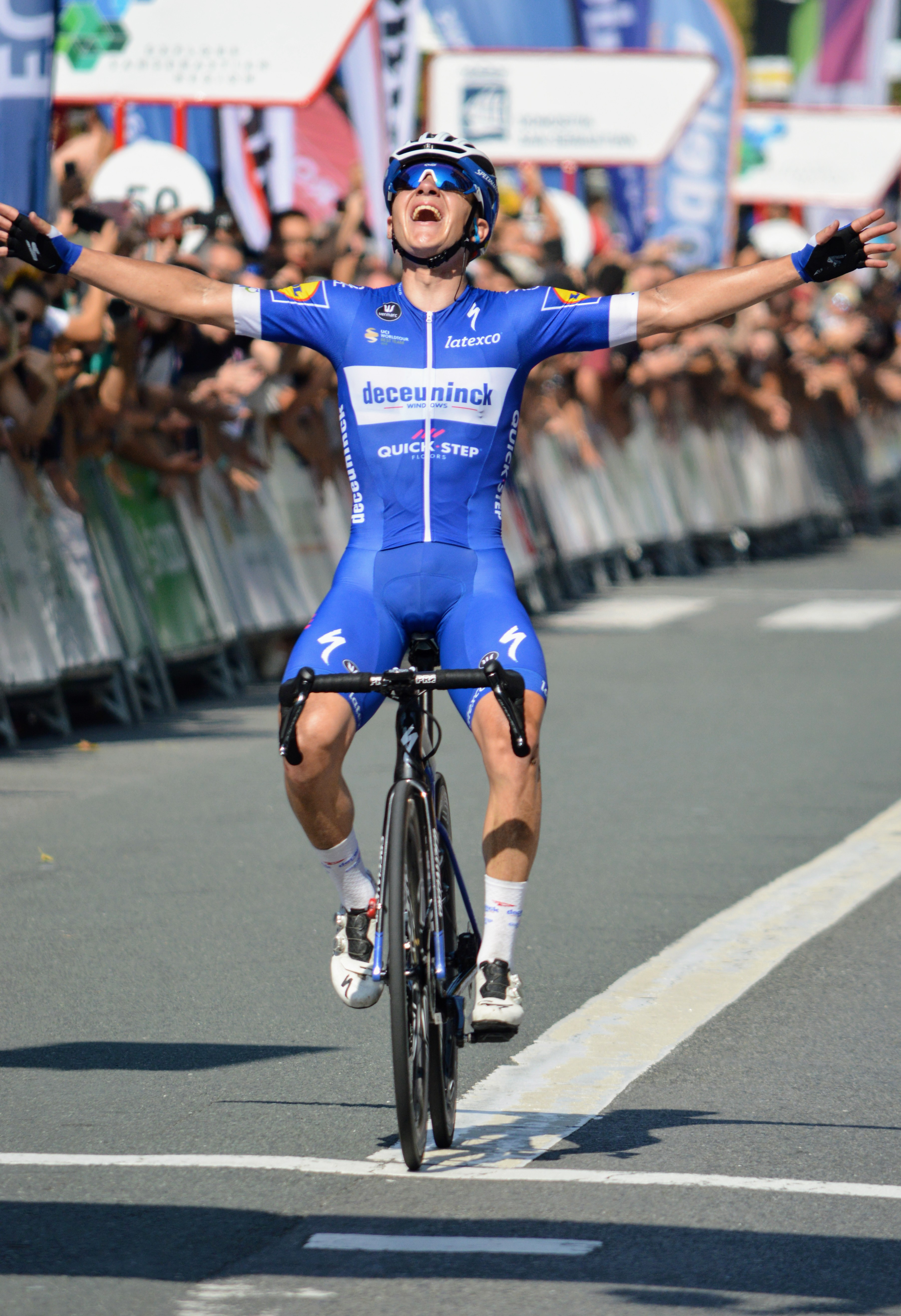
- Remco Evenepoel crossing the finish line to win the race

Race details
- Dates: 3 August 2019
- Stages: 1
- Distance: 227.3 km (141.2 mi)
- Winning time: 5h 44' 27"

Results
	Winner	Remco Evenepoel (BEL)	(Deceuninck–Quick-Step)
	Second	Greg Van Avermaet (BEL)	(CCC Team)
	Third	Marc Hirschi (SUI)	(Team Sunweb)

The 2019 Clásica de San Sebastián was a road cycling one-day race that took place on 3 August in San Sebastián, Spain. It was the 39th edition of the Clásica de San Sebastián and the twenty-eighth event of the 2019 UCI World Tour. It was won by 19 year old Remco Evenepoel.

== Teams ==
Twenty-two teams of seven riders were invited to take part in the race: all eighteen UCI WorldTeams and four UCI Professional Continental teams.

UCI WorldTeams

- AG2R La Mondiale
- Astana
- Bahrain–Merida
- Bora–Hansgrohe
- CCC Team
- Deceuninck–Quick-Step
- EF Education First
- Groupama–FDJ
- Lotto–Soudal
- Mitchelton–Scott
- Movistar Team
- Team Dimension Data
- Team Ineos
- Team Jumbo–Visma
- Team Katusha–Alpecin
- Team Sunweb
- Trek–Segafredo
- UAE Team Emirates

UCI Professional Continental Teams

- Burgos BH
- Caja Rural–Seguros RGA
- Cofidis
- Euskadi–Murias

== Result ==
Result
Rank	Rider	Team	Time
1	Remco Evenepoel (BEL)	Deceuninck–Quick-Step	5h 44’ 27"
2	Greg Van Avermaet (BEL)	CCC Team	+ 38"
3	Marc Hirschi (SUI)	Team Sunweb	+ 38"
4	Gorka Izagirre (ESP)	Astana	+ 38"
5	Bauke Mollema (NED)	Trek–Segafredo	+ 38"
6	Patrick Konrad (AUT)	Bora–Hansgrohe	+ 38"
7	Jelle Vanendert (BEL)	Lotto–Soudal	+ 38"
8	Enric Mas (ESP)	Deceuninck–Quick-Step	+ 38"
9	Michael Woods (CAN)	EF Education First	+ 38"
10	Alejandro Valverde (ESP)	Movistar Team	+ 38"
