= 2018 Milano–Torino =

99th edition of the Milano–Torino cycling classic

2018 UCI Europe Tour

Race details
- Dates: 10 October 2018
- Stages: 1
- Distance: 200 km (124.3 mi)
- Winning time: 4h 43' 36"

Results
	Winner	Thibaut Pinot (FRA)	(Groupama–FDJ)
	Second	Miguel Ángel López (COL)	(Astana)
	Third	Alejandro Valverde (ESP)	(Movistar Team)

The 2018 Milano–Torino was the 99th edition of the Milano–Torino cycling classic. It was held on 10 October 2018 over a distance of 200 km (120 mi) between Magenta and Turin. The race was rated as a 1.HC event on the 2018 UCI Europe Tour. The race was won by French rider Thibaut Pinot of Groupama–FDJ.

== Teams ==
Twenty-one teams, which consisted of 15 of the 18 UCI WorldTour teams and six UCI Professional Continental teams, of up to seven riders started the race:

UCI WorldTeams

- Astana
- Bahrain–Merida
- BMC Racing Team
- Bora–Hansgrohe
- EF Education First–Drapac p/b Cannondale
- Groupama–FDJ
- Lotto–Soudal
- Mitchelton–Scott
- Movistar Team
- Quick-Step Floors
- Team Katusha–Alpecin
- Team Sky
- Team Sunweb
- Trek–Segafredo
- UAE Team Emirates

UCI Professional Continental Teams

- Androni Giocattoli–Sidermec
- Bardiani–CSF
- Fortuneo–Samsic
- Israel Cycling Academy
- Nippo–Vini Fantini–Europa Ovini
- Wilier Triestina–Selle Italia

== Results ==
Result
Rank	Rider	Team	Time
1	Thibaut Pinot (FRA)	Groupama–FDJ	4h 43' 36"
2	Miguel Ángel López (COL)	Astana	+ 10"
3	Alejandro Valverde (ESP)	Movistar Team	+ 28"
4	Mattia Cattaneo (ITA)	Androni Giocattoli–Sidermec	+ 36"
5	Sébastien Reichenbach (SUI)	Groupama–FDJ	+ 38"
6	Wilco Kelderman (NED)	Team Sunweb	+ 38"
7	Domenico Pozzovivo (ITA)	Bahrain–Merida	+ 41"
8	Jakob Fuglsang (DEN)	Astana	+ 41"
9	Fabio Aru (ITA)	UAE Team Emirates	+ 43"
10	Egan Bernal (COL)	Team Sky	+ 45"
