= 2014 Clásica de San Sebastián =

2014 UCI World Tour

Race details
- Dates: 2 August 2014
- Stages: 1
- Distance: 219 km (136.1 mi)
- Winning time: 5h 31' 16"

Results
	Winner	Alejandro Valverde (ESP)	(Movistar Team)
	Second	Bauke Mollema (NED)	(Belkin Pro Cycling)
	Third	Joaquim Rodríguez (ESP)	(Team Katusha)

The 2014 Clásica de San Sebastián was the 34th edition of the Clásica de San Sebastián, a single-day cycling race. It was held on 2 August 2014, over a distance of 219 km (136.1 mi), starting and finishing in San Sebastián, in the Basque Country, Spain. It was won by Alejandro Valverde before Bauke Mollema and Joaquim Rodríguez.

== Teams ==
As the Clásica de San Sebastián was a UCI World Tour event, all 18 UCI ProTeams were invited automatically and obligated to send a squad. Caja Rural–Seguros RGA were given a wildcard place to form a 19-team peloton.

The 19 teams that competed in the race were:

- Ag2r–La Mondiale
- Astana
- Belkin Pro Cycling
- BMC Racing Team
- Caja Rural–Seguros RGA
- Cannondale
- Team Europcar
- FDJ.fr
- Garmin–Sharp
- Giant–Shimano
- Team Katusha
- Lampre–Merida
- Lotto–Belisol
- Movistar Team
- Omega Pharma–Quick-Step
- Orica–GreenEDGE
- Team Sky
- Tinkoff–Saxo
- Trek Factory Racing

== Results ==
	Cyclist	Team	Time	UCI World Tour Points
1	Alejandro Valverde (ESP)	Movistar Team	5h 31' 11"	80
2	Bauke Mollema (NED)	Belkin Pro Cycling	+ 14"	60
3	Joaquim Rodríguez (ESP)	Team Katusha	+ 14"	50
4	Mikel Nieve (ESP)	Team Sky	+ 14"	40
5	Tony Gallopin (FRA)	Lotto–Belisol	+ 26"	30
6	Jelle Vanendert (BEL)	Lotto–Belisol	+ 26"	22
7	Haimar Zubeldia (ESP)	Trek Factory Racing	+ 26"	14
8	Greg Van Avermaet (BEL)	BMC Racing Team	+ 40"	10
9	Giovanni Visconti (ITA)	Movistar Team	+ 40"	6
10	Zdeněk Štybar (CZE)	Omega Pharma–Quick-Step	+ 43"	2
