= Patrick Konrad =

Austrian cyclist

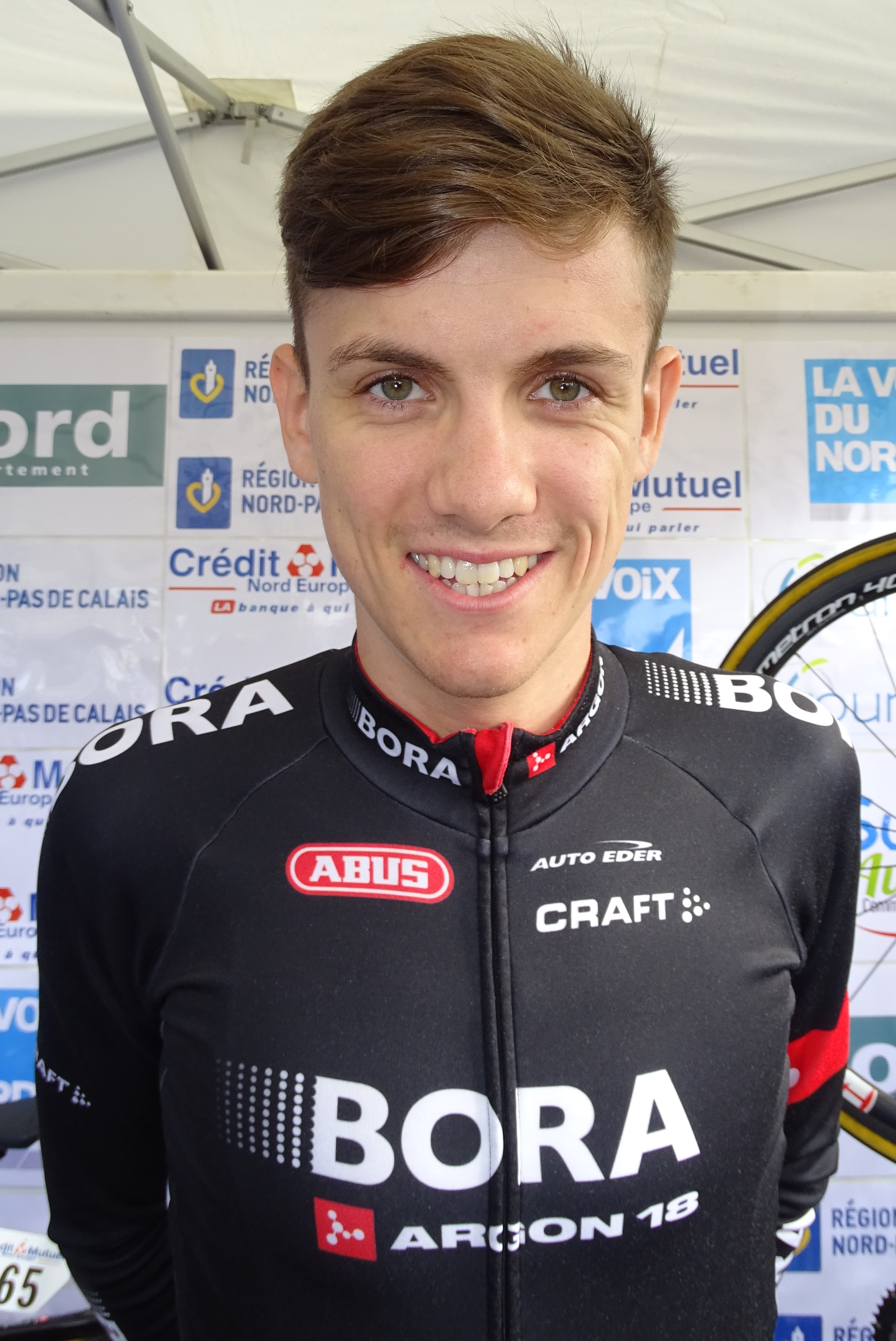
- Konrad in 2015

Personal information
- Full name: Patrick Konrad
- Born: 13 October 1991 (age 35) Mödling, Austria
- Height: 1.80 m (5 ft 11 in)
- Weight: 65 kg (143 lb; 10 st 3 lb)

Cycling career
- Sport: Cycling
- Current team: Lidl–Trek
- Discipline: Road
- Role: Rider
- Rider type: Climber

Professional teams
- 2010–2011: Tyrol–Team Radland Tirol
- 2012: Team Vorarlberg
- 2013: Etixx–IHNed
- 2014: Gourmetfein–Simplon Wels
- 2014: NetApp–Endura (stagiaire)
- 2015–2023: Bora–Argon 18
- 2024–: Lidl–Trek

Major wins
- Grand Tours Tour de France 1 individual stage (2021) One-day races and Classics National Road Race Championships (2019, 2021)

Patrick Konrad (born 13 October 1991) is an Austrian racing cyclist, who currently rides for UCI WorldTeam Lidl–Trek.

== Career ==
Born in Mödling, Konrad finished 4th in the 2014 Tour of Austria for Gourmetfein–Simplon Wels, winning the young rider classification. He joined Bora–Argon 18 for the 2015 season, and he was named in the start list for the 2016 Tour de France and the start list for the 2017 Giro d'Italia. In 2018 he won the mountains classification at the Tour de Pologne, and finished seventh overall at the Giro d'Italia. In 2019 he won the Austrian National Road Race Championships and placed 3rd in the Tour de Suisse. In the 2020 Giro d'Italia, held in October instead of May due to the COVID-19 pandemic in Italy, he finished in eighth place overall.

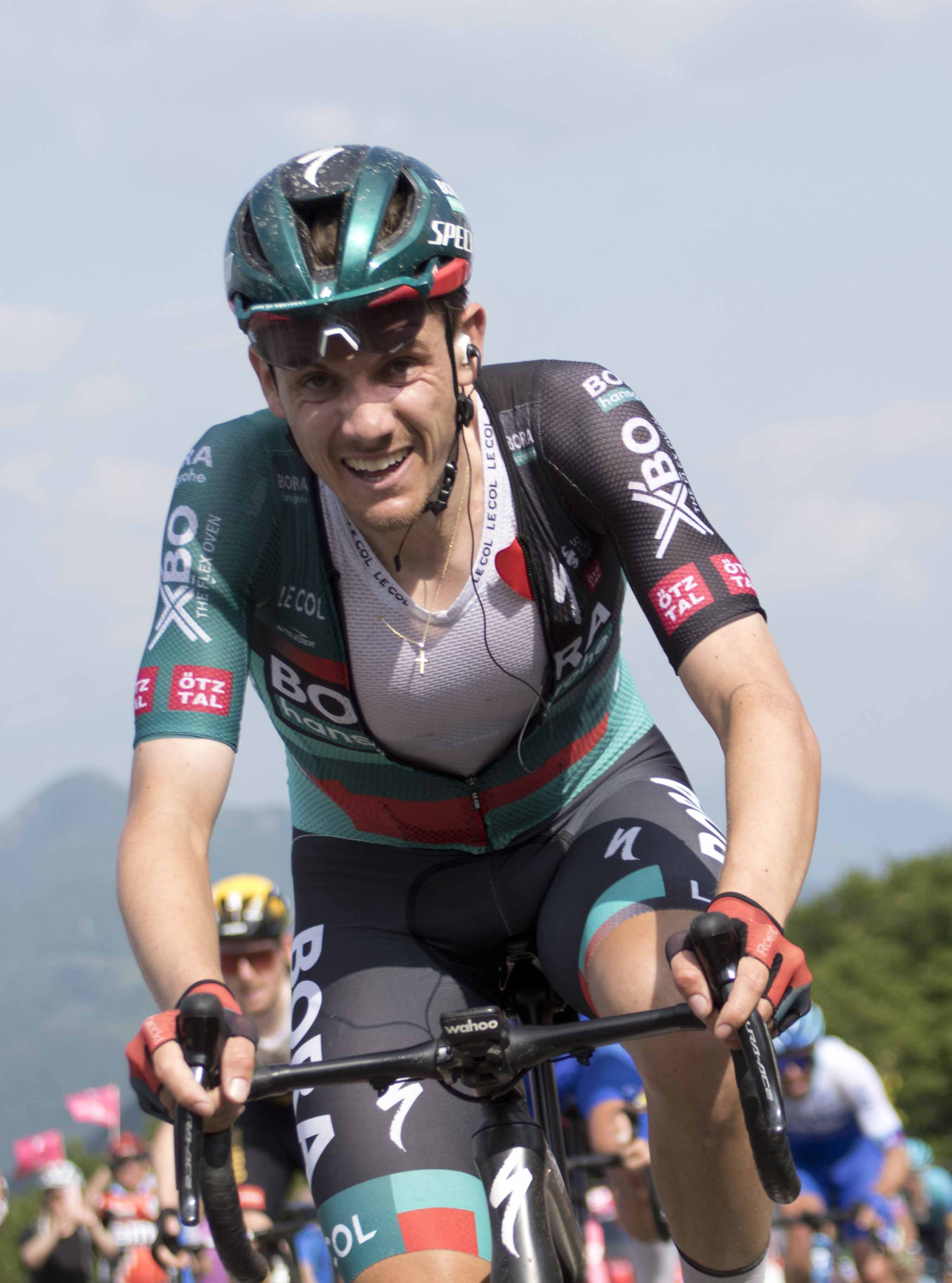
Konrad at the 2023 Giro d'Italia

In 2021, Konrad won his first stage at a Grand Tour, winning a hilly stage 16 of the Tour de France; he also won the stage's combativity award. As a result, he became the third Austrian rider to win a stage at the Tour de France, after Max Bulla in 1931 and Georg Totschnig in 2005.

== Personal life ==
He is the son of the organiser of the Vienna City Marathon and former middle-distance runner Wolfgang Konrad.

== Major results ==
2009
3rd Overall Oberösterreich Juniorenradrundfahrt

1st Stage 2

4th Time trial, National Junior Road Championships
2011
4th Road race, National Road Championships
4th Tobago Cycling Classic
2012
5th Eschborn-Frankfurt City Loop U23
7th Overall Toscana-Terra di Ciclismo
9th Overall Tour de l'Avenir
2013
3rd Overall Tour de l'Avenir
5th Grand Prix Südkärnten
7th Overall Course de la Paix U23
10th Road race, UCI Under-23 Road World Championships
10th Puchar Uzdrowisk Karpackich
2014
1st Overall Oberösterreich Rundfahrt

1st Austrian rider classification

2nd Raiffeisen Grand Prix
4th Overall Tour of Austria

1st Young rider classification

4th Overall Le Triptyque des Monts et Châteaux

1st Stage 2b

4th Grand Prix Südkärnten
6th Overall Rhône-Alpes Isère Tour

1st Combativity classification

10th Croatia–Slovenia
2015
1st Stage 1 (TTT) Giro del Trentino
5th Overall Danmark Rundt
9th Overall Tour de l'Ain
10th Overall Tour of Oman
10th Overall Abu Dhabi Tour
2016
5th Overall Giro del Trentino
6th Rudi Altig Race
2017
3rd Vuelta a Murcia
7th Overall Tour of the Basque Country
10th Overall Abu Dhabi Tour

1st Sprints classification

2018
1st Mountains classification, Tour de Pologne
5th Grand Prix Cycliste de Québec
6th Trofeo Serra de Tramuntana
7th Overall Giro d'Italia
7th Overall Paris–Nice
9th Grand Prix Cycliste de Montréal
10th Overall Tour of the Basque Country
10th La Flèche Wallonne
2019 (1 pro win)
National Road Championships

1st Road race
3rd Time trial

3rd Overall Tour de Suisse
4th Overall Vuelta a Murcia
6th Clásica de San Sebastián
7th La Flèche Wallonne
7th Trofeo Campos, Porreres, Felanitx, Ses Salines
9th Overall Tour of the Basque Country
2020
2nd Overall Sibiu Cycling Tour
7th La Flèche Wallonne
8th Overall Giro d'Italia
2021 (2)
1st Road race, National Road Championships
Tour de France

1st Stage 16
Combativity award Stage 16

5th Overall Tour de la Provence
7th Grand Prix de Wallonie
2022
4th Road race, National Road Championships
5th Hamburg Cyclassics
8th Overall Tour de Hongrie
2023
2nd Eschborn–Frankfurt
4th Road race, National Road Championships
7th Trofeo Andratx–Mirador D'es Colomer
8th Liège–Bastogne–Liège
10th Trofeo Ses Salines–Alcúdia
2024
5th Road race, National Road Championships
7th Clásica de San Sebastián
9th Overall Vuelta a Burgos
2025
5th Road race, National Road Championships
9th Overall Tour Down Under
10th Overall UAE Tour

=== General classification results timeline ===
Grand Tour general classification results
Grand Tour	2015	2016	2017	2018	2019	2020	2021	2022	2023	2024
Giro d'Italia	—	—	16	7	—	8	—	—	20	—
Tour de France	—	65	—	—	35	—	27	16	82	—
Vuelta a España	—	—	96	—	—	—	—	—	—	DNF
Major stage race general classification results
Race	2015	2016	2017	2018	2019	2020	2021	2022	2023	2024
Paris–Nice	—	—	26	7	36	34	—	—	—	—
Tirreno–Adriatico	72	43	—	—	—	33	27	—	—	—
Volta a Catalunya	—	—	—	—	—	—	NH	—	72	40
Tour of the Basque Country	—	—	7	10	9	36	NH	—	—	—
Tour de Romandie	—	—	—	—	—	—	NH	73	—	30
Critérium du Dauphiné	—	59	—	—	—	—	12	12	—	—
Tour de Suisse	—	—	13	74	3	NH	—	—	—	33

=== Classics results timeline ===
Monument	2015	2016	2017	2018	2019	2020	2021	2022	2023	2024
Milan–San Remo	—	90	—	—	—	—	—	—	—	—
Tour of Flanders	Has not contested during his career									
Paris–Roubaix	Has not contested during his career									
Liège–Bastogne–Liège	54	15	20	27	13	—	20	—	8	DNF
Giro di Lombardia	48	—	DNF	18	74	31	55	67	—	
Classic	2015	2016	2017	2018	2019	2020	2021	2022	2023	2024
Strade Bianche	—	—	—	—	—	—	32	DNF	24	—
La Flèche Wallonne	—	—	16	10	7	7	15	DNF	—	DNF
Eschborn–Frankfurt	NH	—	—	—	75	NH	57	—	2	—
Clásica de San Sebastián	—	—	—	—	6	NH	DNF	DNF	—	7
Hamburg Cyclassics	—	94	—	—	—	NH	5	—	—	
Grand Prix Cycliste de Québec	—	DNF	—	5	104	Not held		40	—	—
Grand Prix Cycliste de Montréal	—	DNF	—	9	62	Not held		34	—	—

Legend
—	Did not compete
DNF	Did not finish
NH	Not held
