= Michael Matthews (cyclist) =

Australian racing cyclist

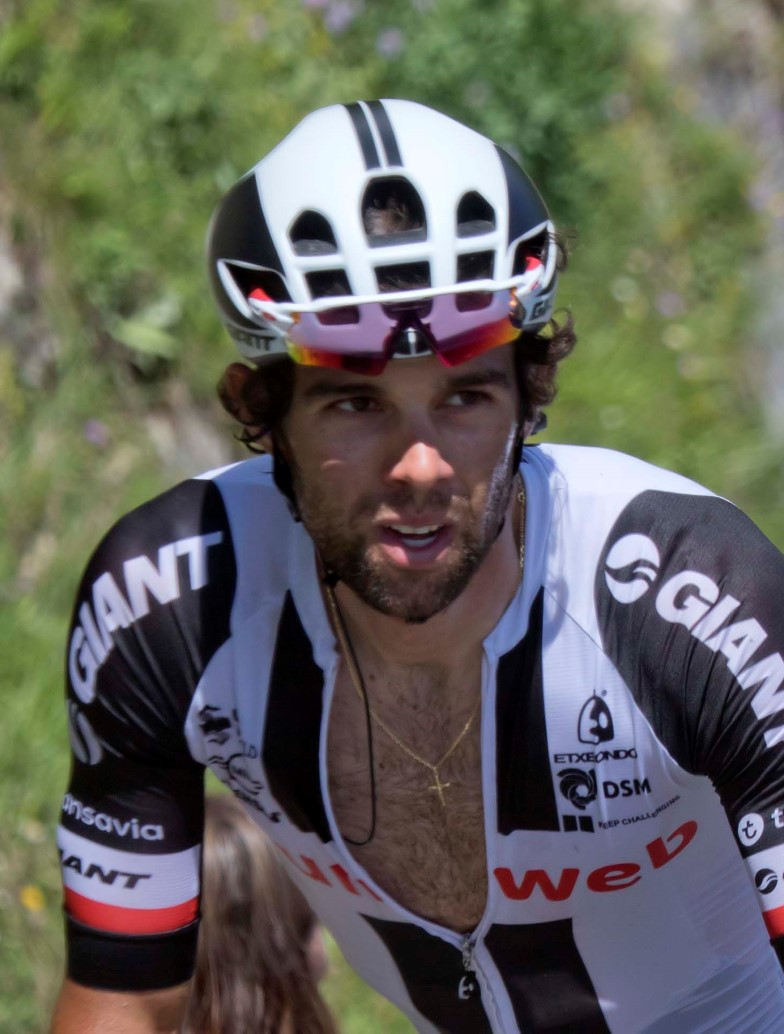
- Matthews at the 2017 Tour de France

Personal information
- Full name: Michael James Matthews
- Nickname: Bling
- Born: 26 September 1990 (age 36) Canberra, Australian Capital Territory, Australia
- Height: 1.78 m (5 ft 10 in)
- Weight: 72 kg (159 lb)

Cycling career
- Sport: Cycling
- Current team: Team Jayco–AlUla
- Disciplines: Road; Track
- Role: Rider
- Rider type: Sprinter; Puncheur

Professional teams
- 2010: Team Jayco–Skins
- 2011–2012: Rabobank
- 2013–2016: Orica–GreenEDGE
- 2017–2020: Team Sunweb
- 2021–: Team BikeExchange

Major wins
- Grand Tours Tour de France Points classification (2017) 4 individual stages (2016, 2017, 2022) Giro d'Italia 3 individual stages (2014, 2015, 2023) 2 TTT stages (2014, 2015) Vuelta a España 3 individual stages (2013, 2014) One-day races and Classics GP de Québec (2018, 2019, 2024) GP de Montreal (2018) Bretagne Classic (2020) Eschborn–Frankfurt (2025) Clásica de Almería (2012) Other UCI Oceania Tour (2009–10)
Medal record
Men's road bicycle racing
Representing Australia
World Championships
Gold medal – first place	2010 Geelong	Under-23 road race
Gold medal – first place	2024 Zurich	Mixed team relay
Gold medal – first place	2025 Kigali	Mixed team relay
Silver medal – second place	2015 Richmond	Elite road race
Silver medal – second place	2026 Montreal	Elite road race
Bronze medal – third place	2017 Bergen	Elite road race
Bronze medal – third place	2022 Wollongong	Elite road race
Bronze medal – third place	2022 Wollongong	Mixed team relay
Representing Orica–Scott
World Championships
Bronze medal – third place	2016 Doha	Team time trial
Representing Team Sunweb
World Championships
Gold medal – first place	2017 Bergen	Team time trial
Silver medal – second place	2018 Innsbruck	Team time trial

Michael James Matthews (born 26 September 1990) is an Australian professional road and track cyclist who currently rides for UCI WorldTeam Team Jayco–AlUla.

== Career ==
=== Early career ===
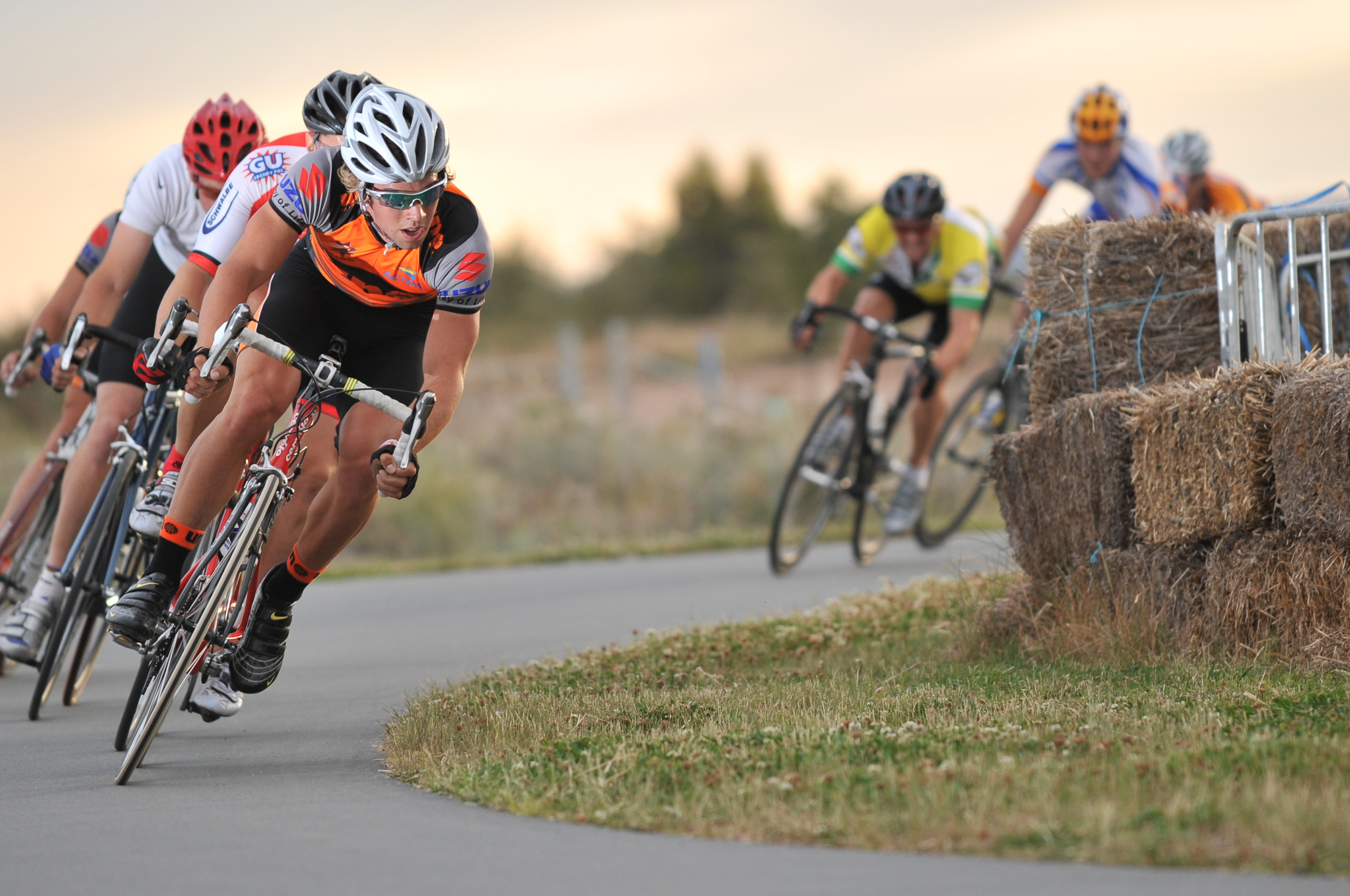
Matthews (leading) during a criterium race in 2008

He was an Australian Institute of Sport scholarship holder, and in 2010 he became the Under 23 Road Race World Champion.

Matthews left Rabobank at the end of the 2012 season, and joined Orica–GreenEDGE on an initial two-year contract from the 2013 season.

=== Orica–GreenEDGE (2013–2016) ===
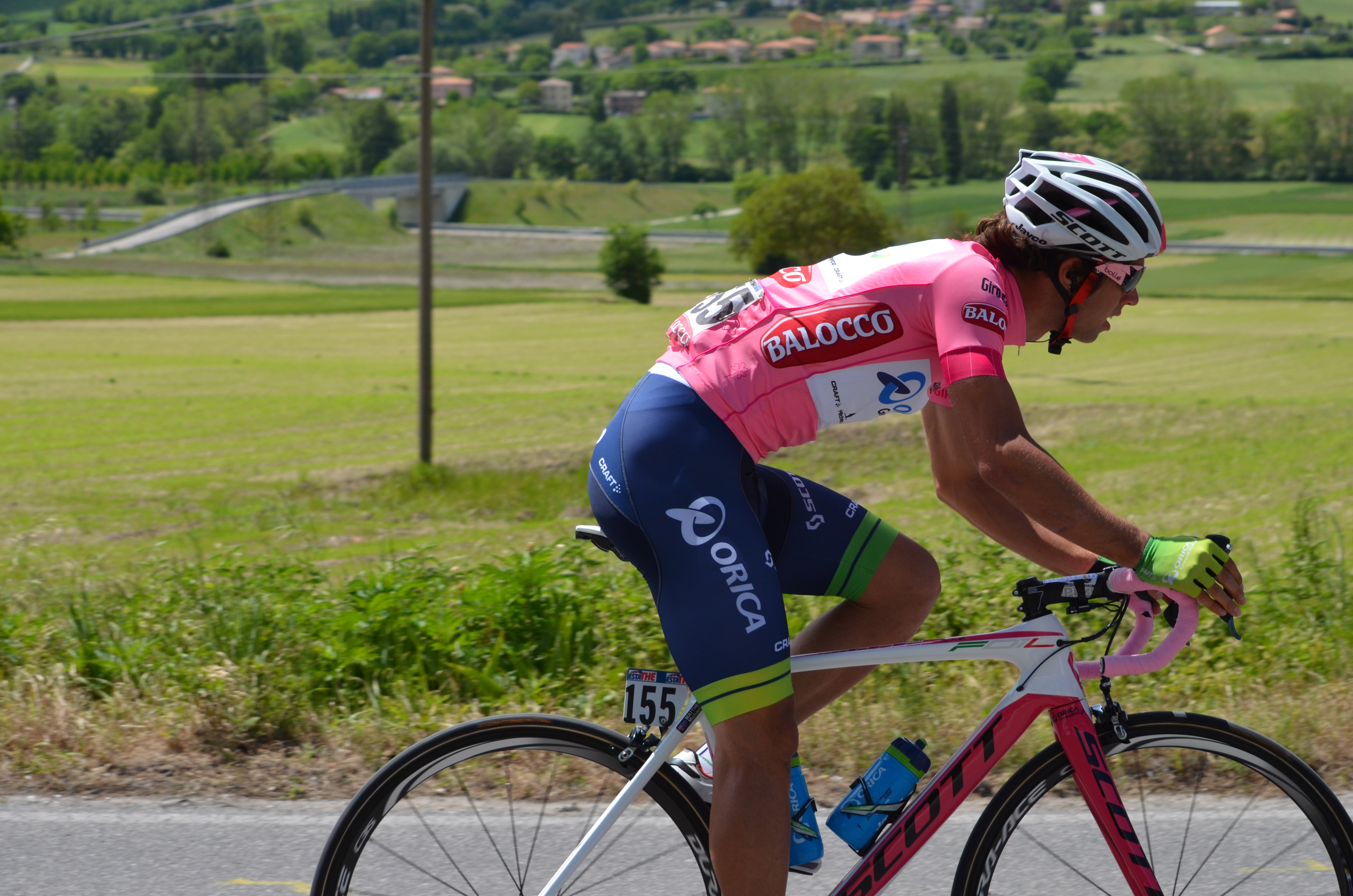
Matthews wearing the pink jersey at the 2014 Giro d'Italia

Matthews was selected to ride the 2014 Giro d'Italia. His Orica–GreenEDGE team won the opening team time trial in Belfast. On Stage 2, Matthews finished eighth behind Marcel Kittel in a sprint finish, also in Belfast, to take the pink jersey for the leader of the general classification from teammate Svein Tuft. Matthews won Stage 6, a hill top finish at Monte Cassino. Matthews withdrew from the Giro after Stage 10 after suffering a crash on Stage 9.

In 2015, Matthews won the points classification jersey of Paris–Nice as well as a stage. He finished in third place in Milan–San Remo. He also met success at the opening stage of the Tour of the Basque Country by outsprinting a group of about fifty riders after a hilly day. He then went on to a second place in the Brabantse Pijl, winning the sprint of the group after nearly getting to lone escapee Ben Hermans. At the Amstel Gold Race, Matthews grabbed another notable result, when he came in third of the final dash for the line while being part of a small leading group. At the Tour de Suisse, Matthews won stage 4 after following Peter Sagan's wheel in the sprint and passing him in the final metres. He was named in the start list for the Tour de France.

In the 2016 Tour de France, Matthews out-sprinted a breakaway group of 7 riders to win stage 10, his first stage win in the Tour de France, completing a set of Grand Tour stage victories.

In August 2016, it was confirmed that Matthews would join Team Sunweb for the 2017 season.

=== Team Sunweb (2017–2020) ===
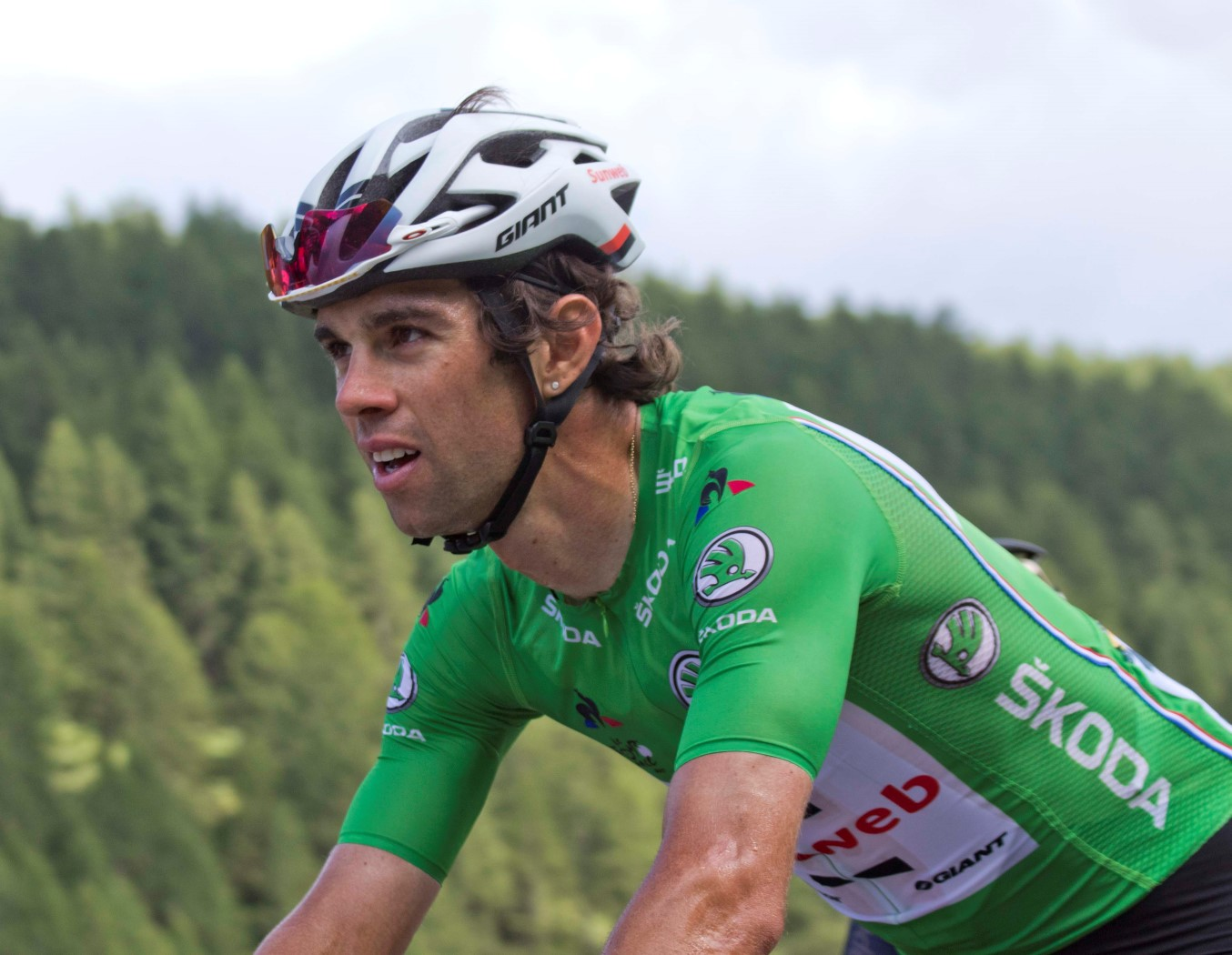
Matthews wearing the green jersey at the 2017 Tour de France

Matthews was expected to contend for the points classification at the 2017 Tour de France, and his chances were boosted on Stage 4 after an incident during the final sprint which saw Mark Cavendish forced out of the race through injury and Peter Sagan, winner of the classification in the previous 5 Tours, disqualified. Matthews won Stage 14, a reduced peloton uphill sprint finish at Rodez. On Stage 16, the high pace set by Matthews's Team Sunweb dropped the green jersey wearer Kittel; Matthews, who was second to Kittel in points classification, won the stage. On Stage 17, Kittel crashed and withdrew from the Tour, putting Matthews in the green jersey. Matthews retained the jersey to Paris.

In 2018 he won the Grand Prix Cycliste de Québec ahead of Greg Van Avermaet and Jasper Stuyven, before adding the Grand Prix Cycliste de Montréal two days later, which he won ahead of Sonny Colbrelli and Van Avermaet. As a result, he became the second rider to win both Laurentian classic races in the same year, after compatriot Simon Gerrans in 2014. In 2019, he won two stages at the Volta a Catalunya, before repeating his victory in the Grand Prix Cycliste de Québec.

He finished 3rd in the 2020 Milan-San Remo and late in the year he took a top 10 in the UCI World Championships road race. A month earlier he won the 2020 Bretagne Classic Ouest–France, which was one of the few races that was run at its normal time during the COVID pandemic.

=== Team BikeExchange-Jayco ===
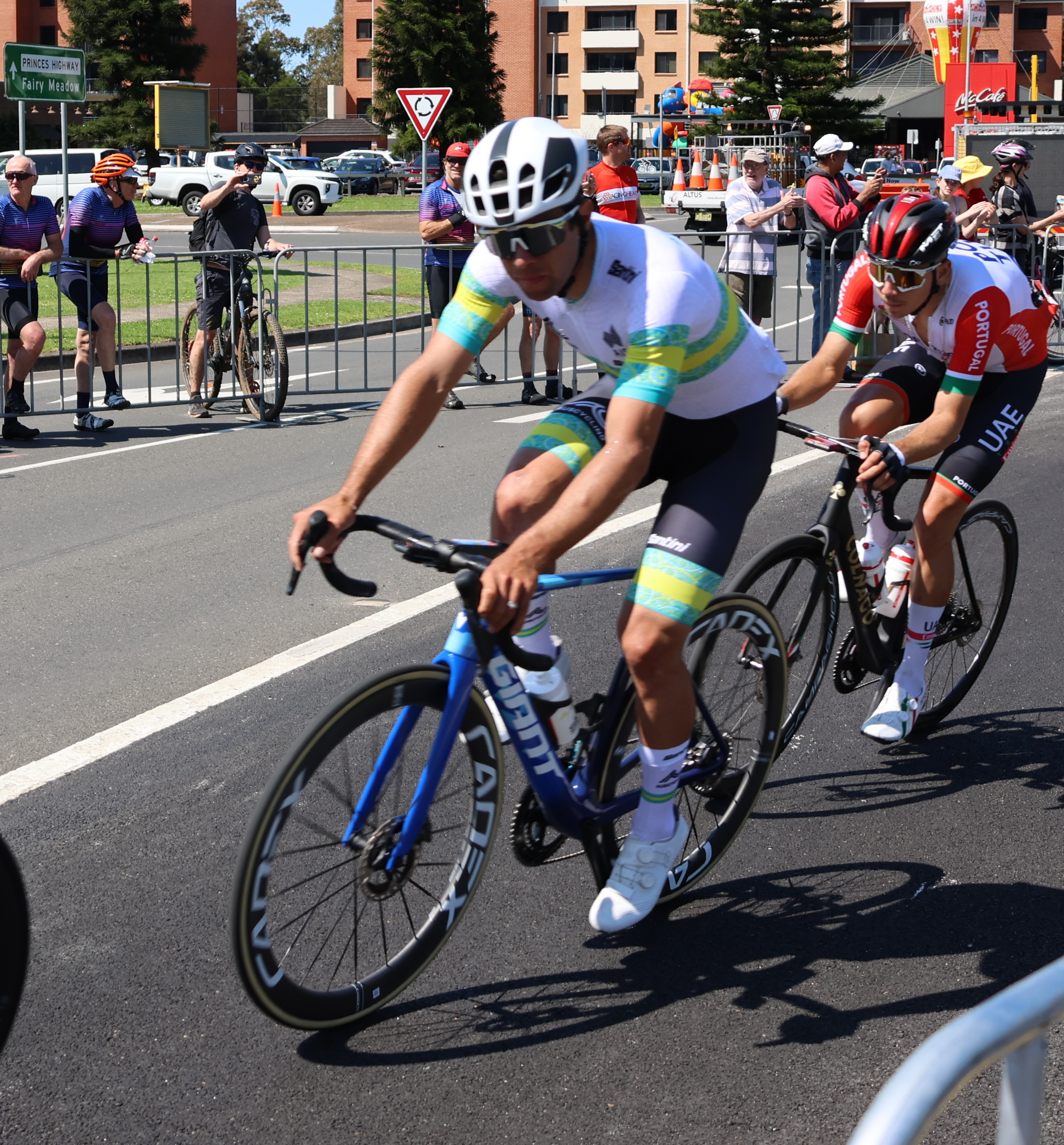
Michael Matthews representing Australia in Wollongong 2022

In August 2020, Matthews signed a two-year contract with Mitchelton–Scott, later renamed as Team BikeExchange, from the 2021 season.

In 2021 he had some strong results but no major wins, including 4th at the Amstel Gold Race, 5th in Gent–Wevelgem and 6th in Milan–San Remo. He rode Le Tour, but did not win any stages. He finished 2nd in the points classification, the second highest finish of his career, losing to Mark Cavendish 337–291.

In 2022 he had top 10 finishes in Brabantse Pijl, the Amstel Gold Race and 2022 Milan-San Remo. He won the first stage at the Volta a Catalunya, his first victory with Team BikeExchange. This victory was overshadowed as it was the stage where one of his primary rivals, Sonny Colbrelli, had a near fatal heart attack after crossing the finish line. In June he won the black jersey during the COVID marred 2022 Tour de Suisse. During the 2022 Tour de France he suffered two defeats in back to back stages; finishing 2nd to his friend Tadej Pogačar, and then the next day to rival Wout Van Aert. On stage 14 he got involved in a breakaway and survived to the final climb outlasting all of the breakaway riders except Alberto Bettiol. It looked as though he was about to be defeated again, when he appeared to suffer from cramps and Bettiol rode away from him on the final climb. Matthews was able to recover, catch and drop Bettiol, and solo to the line for his first Tour win this decade.

In the 2023 Giro d'Italia Matthews won Stage 3 ahead of Mads Pederson in a bunch sprint. It was his first stage win at the Giro since 2015.

== Personal life ==
In August 2015, he married his Slovak girlfriend Katarína Hajzer.

In June 2025, he was diagnosed with Pulmonary embolism.

== Career achievements ==
=== Major results ===
2008
1st John Woodman Memorial
Internazionale Bresciana

1st Points classification
1st Prologue & Stage 3b (ITT)

1st Stage 7 Tour of the Murray River
2nd Overall GP Général Patton

1st Stage 2

8th Road race, UCI Junior World Championships
2009
Oceania Road Championships (November)

1st Road race
1st Under-23 road race
1st Under-23 time trial

2nd Time trial, Oceania Under-23 Road Championships (February)
National Under-23 Road Championships

2nd Road race
3rd Time trial

2nd Gran Premio della Liberazione
9th Overall Tour of Japan
2010 (2 pro wins)
1st Road race, UCI Road World Under-23 Championships
Tour de Langkawi

1st Stages 1 & 3

1st Stage 1 (TTT) Thüringen Rundfahrt der U23
2nd Trofeo Banca Popolare di Vicenza
2nd Ronde van Vlaanderen Beloften
2nd Gran Premio della Liberazione
National Under-23 Road Championships

3rd Road race
3rd Time trial

4th Overall Tour of Japan

1st Stage 1 (ITT)

5th Overall Tour of Wellington

1st Stage 4

7th Overall Ringerike GP

1st Stages 2 & 3

8th Overall Tour de l'Avenir
2011 (3)
1st Rund um Köln
1st Stage 2 Jayco Bay Cycling Classic
1st Stage 1 Vuelta a Murcia
3rd Time trial, National Road Championships
3rd Eschborn–Frankfurt City Loop
4th Overall Tour Down Under

1st Stage 3

5th Overall Delta Tour Zeeland
6th Grote Prijs Jef Scherens
2012 (2)
1st Clásica de Almería
Tour of Utah

1st Sprints classification
1st Stage 3

9th Overall Tour Down Under
10th Brabantse Pijl
2013 (4)
Vuelta a España

1st Stages 5 & 21
Held after Stages 6 & 7

Tour of Utah

1st Sprints classification
1st Stages 2 & 4

National Road Championships

2nd Road race
3rd Time trial

2nd Vuelta a La Rioja
2014 (5)
1st Vuelta a La Rioja
Giro d'Italia

1st Stages 1 (TTT) & 6
Held after Stages 2–7
Held after Stages 2–7
Held after Stages 6 & 7

Vuelta a España

1st Stage 3
Held after Stages 3–5
Held after Stage 4

Tour of Slovenia

1st Points classification
1st Stage 1 (ITT)

1st Stage 3 Tour of the Basque Country
2nd Brabantse Pijl
6th Trofeo Ses Salines
7th Trofeo Palma
2015 (5)
Giro d'Italia

1st Stages 1 (TTT) & 3
Held after Stages 2–3
Held after Stages 1–3

Paris–Nice

1st Points classification
1st Stage 3

Tour of Alberta

1st Points classification
1st Stage 2

1st Stage 1 Tour of the Basque Country
1st Stage 4 Tour de Suisse
2nd Road race, UCI Road World Championships
2nd Grand Prix Cycliste de Québec
2nd Brabantse Pijl
3rd Milan–San Remo
3rd Amstel Gold Race
Combativity award Stage 5 Tour de France
2016 (4)
1st Vuelta a La Rioja
1st Stage 10 Tour de France
Paris–Nice

1st Points classification
1st Prologue & Stage 2

UCI Road World Championships

3rd Team time trial
4th Road race

3rd London–Surrey Classic
4th Bretagne Classic
4th Grand Prix Cycliste de Montréal
5th Brabantse Pijl
5th Amstel Gold Race
5th Grand Prix Cycliste de Québec
2017 (4)
UCI Road World Championships

1st Team time trial
3rd Road race

Tour de France

1st Points classification
1st Stages 14 & 16

1st Stage 1 Tour of the Basque Country
1st Stage 3 Tour de Suisse
3rd Grand Prix Cycliste de Québec
3rd London–Surrey Classic
4th Liège–Bastogne–Liège
5th Bretagne Classic
8th Gent–Wevelgem
8th Grand Prix Cycliste de Montréal
9th UCI World Tour
10th Amstel Gold Race
2018 (4)
1st Grand Prix Cycliste de Québec
1st Grand Prix Cycliste de Montréal
1st Prologue Tour de Romandie
2nd Team time trial, UCI Road World Championships
2nd Overall BinckBank Tour

1st Stage 7

2nd Eschborn–Frankfurt
4th Bretagne Classic
5th La Flèche Wallonne
7th UCI World Tour
7th Milan–San Remo
2019 (3)
1st Grand Prix Cycliste de Québec
Volta a Catalunya

1st Points classification
1st Stages 2 & 6

4th Brabantse Pijl
6th Tour of Flanders
8th La Flèche Wallonne
2020 (1)
1st Bretagne Classic
3rd Milan–San Remo
7th Road race, UCI Road World Championships
2021
4th Amstel Gold Race
5th Gent–Wevelgem
6th Milan–San Remo
6th Grand Prix of Aargau Canton
9th Eschborn–Frankfurt
2022 (2)
Tour de France

1st Stage 14
Combativity award Stage 14

1st Stage 1 Volta a Catalunya
1st Points classification, Tour de Suisse
2nd Grand Prix Cycliste de Québec
UCI Road World Championships

3rd Road race
3rd Team relay

4th Milan–San Remo
4th Trofeo Pollença–Port d'Andratx
6th Trofeo Alcúdia–Port d'Alcúdia
6th Trofeo Playa de Palma
7th Amstel Gold Race
7th Brabantse Pijl
2023 (1)
1st Stage 3 Giro d'Italia
1st Sprints classification, Tour Down Under
3rd Road race, National Road Championships
3rd Grand Prix Cycliste de Québec
4th Cadel Evans Great Ocean Road Race
4th Trofeo Matteotti
2024 (2)
1st Team relay, UCI Road World Championships
1st Grand Prix Cycliste de Québec
1st Gran Premio Castellón
2nd Milan–San Remo
7th Bretagne Classic
8th Brabantse Pijl
10th Amstel Gold Race
2025 (1)
1st Team relay, UCI Road World Championships
1st Eschborn–Frankfurt
4th Milan–San Remo
5th Amstel Gold Race
5th Coppa Bernocchi
5th Gran Piemonte
7th Japan Cup
8th Bretagne Classic
9th Grand Prix Cycliste de Québec
2026 (1)
1st Gran Premio Castellón
2nd Road race, UCI Road World Championships
6th Grand Prix Cycliste de Québec
8th Gran Piemonte

==== Grand Tour record ====
	2013	2014	2015	2016	2017	2018	2019	2020	2021	2022	2023
Giro d'Italia	—	DNS-11	DNS-14	—	—	—	—	DNS-10	—	—	63
Stages won	—	1	1	—	—	—	—	0	—	—	1
Points classification	—	—	—	—	—	—	—	—	—	—	3
Tour de France	—	—	152	110	69	DNS-5	67	—	79	77	—
Stages won	—	—	0	1	2	0	0	—	0	1	—
Points classification	—	—	73	3	1	—	5	—	2	8	—
Vuelta a España	110	75	—	—	—	—	—	—	70	—	—
Stages won	2	1	—	—	—	—	—	—	0	—	—
Points classification	9	6	—	—	—	—	—	—	7	—	—

==== Classics results timeline ====
Monument	2011	2012	2013	2014	2015	2016	2017	2018	2019	2020	2021	2022	2023	2024	2025	2026
Milan–San Remo	107	—	—	78	3	59	12	7	12	3	6	4	—	2	4	—
Tour of Flanders	—	—	—	—	—	—	—	—	6	—	21	11	DNF	11	13	—
Paris–Roubaix	—	—	—	—	—	—	—	—	—	NH	—	—	—	—	—	—
Liège–Bastogne–Liège	—	—	128	—	—	—	4	63	35	—	19	DNF	—	36	11	—
Giro di Lombardia	—	—	DNF	—	—	—	DNF	DNF	—	—	—	—	—	—	—	—
Classic	2011	2012	2013	2014	2015	2016	2017	2018	2019	2020	2021	2022	2023	2024	2025	2026
Omloop Het Nieuwsblad	—	—	DNF	—	—	—	—	DNF	12	—	—	—	—	—	—	—
E3 Harelbeke	—	—	—	—	—	—	—	13	—	NH	DNF	—	—	DNF	27	—
Gent–Wevelgem	69	—	—	—	—	—	8	13	—	—	5	—	—	62	39	—
Brabantse Pijl	DNF	10	—	2	2	5	11	—	4	—	DNF	7	—	8	—	—
Amstel Gold Race	—	—	DNF	12	3	5	10	24	16	NH	4	7	—	10	5	—
La Flèche Wallonne	—	—	112	—	DNF	21	67	5	8	—	21	DNS	—	DNF	32	—
Eschborn–Frankfurt	3	—	—	—	NH	—	15	2	DNF	NH	9	—	14	—	1	—
Clásica de San Sebastián	—	—	DNF	—	—	—	—	55	—	NH	—	—	—	—	—	—
Bretagne Classic	134	48	—	—	—	4	5	4	14	1	—	27	12	7	8	17
Grand Prix Cycliste de Québec	—	DNF	—	—	2	5	3	1	1	Not held		2	3	1	9	6
Grand Prix Cycliste de Montréal	—	71	—	—	19	4	8	1	19	Not held		13	26	DNF	DNF	54
Gran Piemonte	—	—	Not held		—	—	NH	—	—	—	—	—	31	—	5	8

Legend
1	Winner
2–3	Top three-finish
4–10	Top ten-finish
11–	Other finish
DNE	Did not enter
DNF-x	Did not finish (retired on stage x)
DNS-x	Did not start (not started on stage x)
HD-x	Finished outside time limit (occurred on stage x)
DSQ	Disqualified
N/A	Race/classification not held
NR	Not ranked in this classification

=== Awards ===
- 2017 – Sir Hubert Opperman Trophy (Australian Cyclist of the Year), Men's Elite Road Cyclist of the Year and the People's Choice Award.
- 2017 – ACT Sport Male Athlete of the Year.
