= 2018 Grand Prix Cycliste de Québec =

Cycling race

2018 UCI World Tour, race 33 of 37

Race details
- Dates: 7 September 2018
- Stages: 1
- Distance: 201.6 km (125.3 mi)
- Winning time: 5h 04' 17"

Results
	Winner	Michael Matthews (AUS)	(Team Sunweb)
	Second	Greg Van Avermaet (BEL)	(BMC Racing Team)
	Third	Jasper Stuyven (BEL)	(Trek–Segafredo)

The 2018 Grand Prix Cycliste de Québec was a road cycling one-day race that took place on 7 September 2018 in Canada. It was the 9th edition of the Grand Prix Cycliste de Québec and the 33rd event of the 2018 UCI World Tour. It was won in the sprint by Michael Matthews before Greg Van Avermaet and Jasper Stuyven.

== Results ==
Result
Rank	Rider	Team	Time
1	Michael Matthews (AUS)	Team Sunweb	5h 04' 17"
2	Greg van Avermaet (BEL)	BMC Racing Team	+ 0"
3	Jasper Stuyven (BEL)	Trek–Segafredo	+ 0"
4	Timo Roosen (NED)	LottoNL–Jumbo	+ 0"
5	Patrick Konrad (AUT)	Bora–Hansgrohe	+ 0"
6	Zdeněk Štybar (CZE)	Quick-Step Floors	+ 0"
7	Arthur Vichot (FRA)	Groupama–FDJ	+ 0"
8	Nathan Haas (AUS)	Team Katusha–Alpecin	+ 0"
9	Michael Valgren (DEN)	Astana	+ 0"
10	Anthony Roux (FRA)	Groupama–FDJ	+ 0"
