= Timo Roosen =

Dutch cyclist

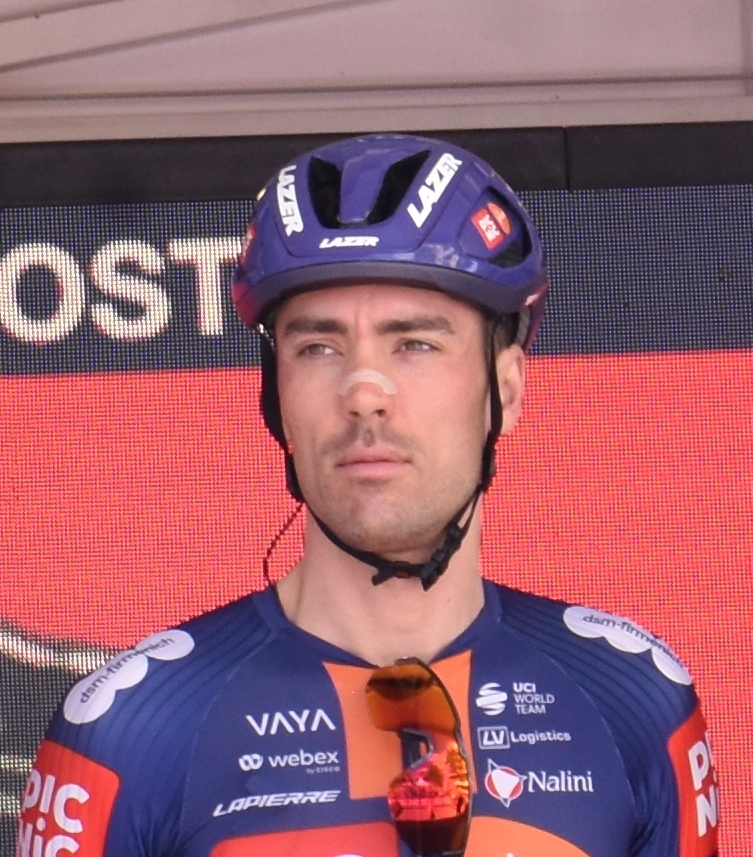
- Roosen in 2025

Personal information
- Born: 11 January 1993 (age 33) Tilburg, Netherlands
- Height: 1.94 m (6 ft 4 1/2 in)
- Weight: 75 kg (165 lb; 11 st 11 lb)

Cycling career
- Sport: Cycling
- Current team: Team Picnic–PostNL
- Discipline: Road
- Role: Rider

Amateur team
- 2013: Rabobank Development Team (stagiaire)

Professional teams
- 2014: Rabobank Development Team
- 2015–2023: LottoNL–Jumbo
- 2024–: Team dsm–firmenich PostNL

Major wins
- Single-day races and Classics National Road Race Championships (2021)

Timo Roosen (born 11 January 1993) is a Dutch cyclist, who currently rides for UCI WorldTeam Team Picnic–PostNL. He was named in the start list for the 2015 Vuelta a España and the start list for the 2016 Tour de France. In 2021, he won the Dutch National Road Race Championships.

== Major results ==
2011
1st Stage 3 Sint-Martinusprijs Kontich
2013
1st Stage 1 Tour de Berlin
2014
1st Sprints classification Ster ZLM Toer
2nd Overall Kreiz Breizh Elites

1st Young rider classification
1st Stage 3

5th Omloop der Kempen
6th Overall Olympia's Tour
10th Paris–Tours Espoirs
2015
7th Ronde van Zeeland Seaports
2017
1st Tacx Pro Classic
3rd Overall Tour des Fjords

1st Stage 2

7th Grote Prijs Stad Zottegem
2018
4th Road race, National Road Championships
4th Grand Prix Cycliste de Québec
5th Grand Prix Cycliste de Montréal
6th Overall Tour des Fjords
7th Overall Dubai Tour
2019
2nd Kampioenschap van Vlaanderen
3rd Famenne Ardenne Classic
4th Binche–Chimay–Binche
8th Grand Prix Cycliste de Québec
2020
3rd Road race, National Road Championships
7th Dwars door het Hageland
8th Gooikse Pijl
2021
1st Road race, National Road Championships
2022
1st Stage 2 Vuelta a Burgos
4th Ronde van Drenthe

=== Grand Tour general classification results timeline ===
Grand Tour	2015	2016	2017	2018	2019	2020	2021	2022	2023	2024	2025
Giro d'Italia	—	—	—	—	—	—	—	—	—	—	—
Tour de France	—	111	DNF	137	—	—	—	—	—	—	—
Vuelta a España	95	—	—	—	—	—	—	—	—	—	137

Legend
—	Did not compete
DNF	Did not finish

Sporting positions
Preceded by Mathieu van der Poel	Dutch National Road Race; Champion; 2021	Succeeded by Pascal Eenkhoorn
