= 2018 Grand Prix Cycliste de Montréal =

Cycling race

2018 UCI World Tour, race 34 of 37
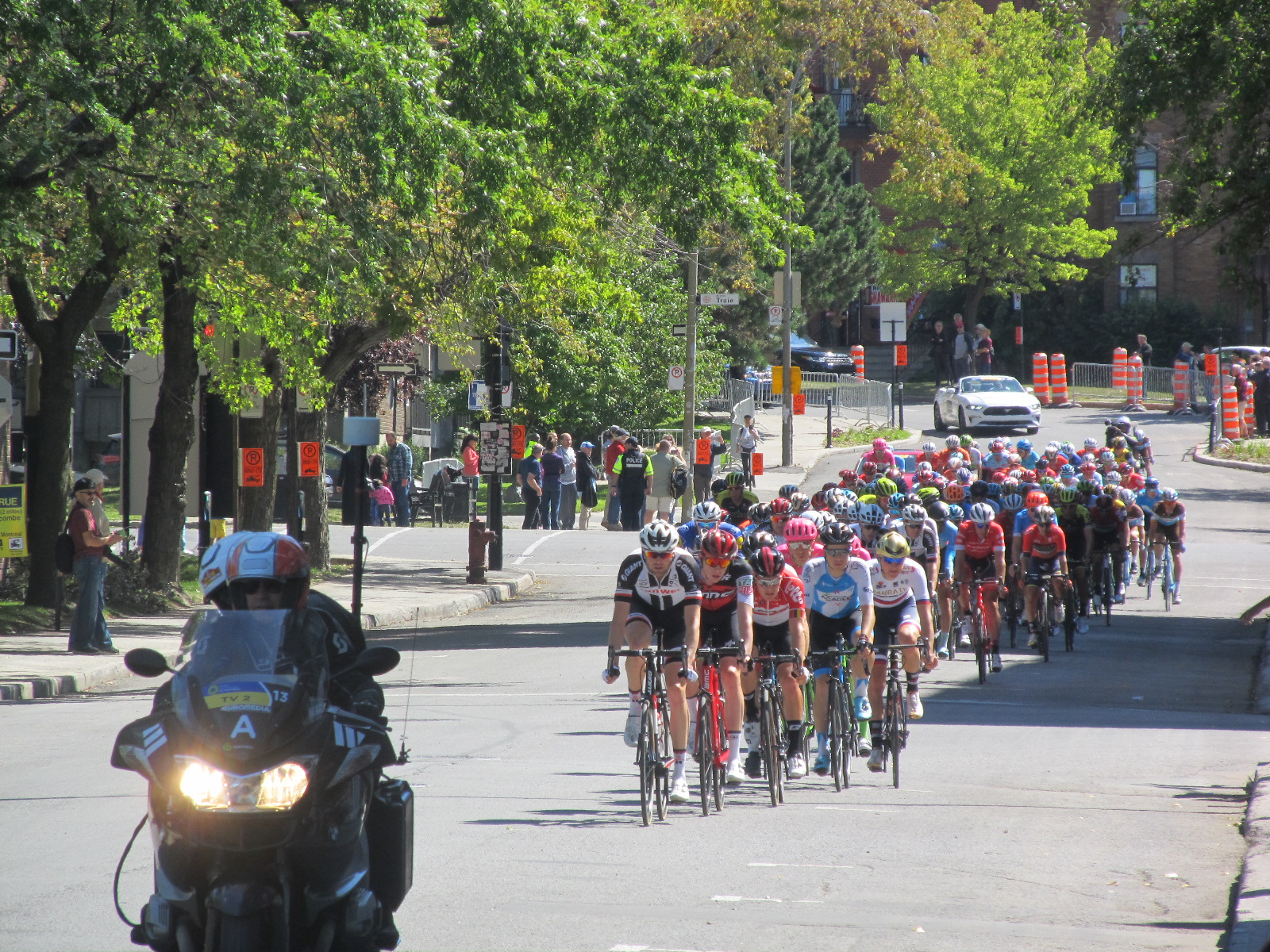

Race details
- Dates: 9 September 2018
- Stages: 1
- Distance: 195.2 km (121.3 mi)
- Winning time: 5h 19' 27"

Results
	Winner	Michael Matthews (AUS)	(Team Sunweb)
	Second	Sonny Colbrelli (ITA)	(Bahrain–Merida)
	Third	Greg Van Avermaet (BEL)	(BMC Racing Team)

The 2018 Grand Prix Cycliste de Montréal was a road cycling one-day race that took place on 9 September 2018 in Canada. It was the 9th edition of the Grand Prix Cycliste de Montréal and the 34th event of the 2018 UCI World Tour. It was won in the sprint by Michael Matthews before Sonny Colbrelli and Greg Van Avermaet.

== Results ==
Result
Rank	Rider	Team	Time
1	Michael Matthews (AUS)	Team Sunweb	5h 19' 27"
2	Sonny Colbrelli (ITA)	Bahrain–Merida	+ 0"
3	Greg van Avermaet (BEL)	BMC Racing Team	+ 0"
4	Oliver Naesen (BEL)	AG2R La Mondiale	+ 0"
5	Timo Roosen (NED)	LottoNL–Jumbo	+ 0"
6	Rui Costa (POR)	UAE Team Emirates	+ 0"
7	Diego Ulissi (ITA)	UAE Team Emirates	+ 0"
8	Michael Valgren (DEN)	Astana	+ 0"
9	Patrick Konrad (AUT)	Bora–Hansgrohe	+ 0"
10	Edvald Boasson Hagen (NOR)	Team Dimension Data	+ 0"
