= 2012 Clásica de Almería =

Race details
- Dates: 26 February 2012
- Stages: 1
- Distance: 185.6 km (115.3 mi)
- Winning time: 4h 24' 17"

Results
	Winner	Michael Matthews (AUS)
	Second	Borut Božič (SLO)
	Third	Roger Kluge (GER)

The 2012 Clásica de Almería was the 27th edition of the Clásica de Almería cycle race and was held on 26 February 2012. The race started and finished in Almería. The race was won by Michael Matthews.

== General classification ==
Final general classification

Rank	Rider	Time
1	Michael Matthews (AUS)	4h 24' 17"
2	Borut Božič (SLO)	+ 0"
3	Roger Kluge (GER)	+ 0"
4	Stéphane Poulhies (FRA)	+ 0"
5	Francisco Ventoso (ESP)	+ 0"
6	Pim Ligthart (NED)	+ 0"
7	Giovanni Visconti (ITA)	+ 0"
8	Michel Kreder (NED)	+ 0"
9	Daniel Schorn (AUT)	+ 0"
10	Aitor Galdós (ESP)	+ 0"
