= 2014 Brabantse Pijl =

2014 UCI Europe Tour
- Event poster with previous winner Peter Sagan

Race details
- Dates: 16 April 2014
- Stages: 1
- Distance: 203 km (126.1 mi)
- Winning time: 4h 56' 26"

Results
	Winner	Philippe Gilbert (BEL)	(BMC Racing Team)
	Second	Michael Matthews (AUS)	(Orica–GreenEDGE)
	Third	Tony Gallopin (FRA)	(Lotto–Belisol)

The 2014 Brabantse Pijl was the 54th edition of the Brabantse Pijl road cycling race. Held on 16 April 2014, it started in Leuven and ended 203 kilometres (126 mi) later in Overijse. It was a 1.HC-ranked race that was part of the 2014 UCI Europe Tour. The main difficulty in the race was caused by 26 climbs, as well as the finishing climb in on the Schavei.

The race was won by Philippe Gilbert (BMC Racing Team) in a bunch sprint. Michael Matthews (Orica–GreenEDGE) finished second and Tony Gallopin (Lotto–Belisol) third.

== Results ==
	Cyclist	Team	Time
1	Philippe Gilbert (BEL)	BMC Racing Team	4hr 54' 26"
2	Michael Matthews (AUS)	Orica–GreenEDGE	s.t.
3	Tony Gallopin (FRA)	Lotto–Belisol	s.t.
4	Simon Geschke (GER)	Team Giant–Shimano	s.t.
5	Bjorn Leukemans (BEL)	Wanty–Groupe Gobert	s.t.
6	Nathan Haas (AUS)	Garmin–Sharp	s.t.
7	Davide Rebellin (ITA)	CCC–Polsat–Polkowice	s.t.
8	Julien Vermote (BEL)	Omega Pharma–Quick-Step	s.t.
9	Sebastien Reichenbach (SUI)	IAM Cycling	s.t.
10	Alexei Tsatevich (RUS)	Team Katusha	s.t.
