= 2024 Grand Prix Cycliste de Québec =

One-day cycling race in Canada

2024 UCI World Tour, race 32 of 35

Race details
- Dates: 13 September 2024
- Stages: 1
- Distance: 201.6 km (125.3 mi)
- Winning time: 4h 45' 36"

Results
	Winner	Michael Matthews (AUS)	(Team Jayco–AlUla)
	Second	Biniam Girmay (ERI)	(Intermarché–Wanty)
	Third	Rudy Molard (FRA)	(Groupama–FDJ)

The 2024 Grand Prix Cycliste de Québec was a road cycling one-day race that took place on 13 September 2024 in Quebec City, Canada. It was the 13th edition of the Grand Prix Cycliste de Québec and the 32nd event of the 2024 UCI World Tour. The race was won by Michael Matthews in a bunch sprint.

== Teams ==
All eighteen UCI WorldTeams, five UCI ProTeams, and the Canadian national team made up the twenty-four teams that participated in the race.

UCI WorldTeams

- Alpecin–Deceuninck
- Arkéa–B&B Hotels
- Astana Qazaqstan Team
- Cofidis
- Decathlon–AG2R La Mondiale
- EF Education–EasyPost
- Groupama–FDJ
- Ineos Grenadiers
- Intermarché–Wanty
- Lidl–Trek
- Movistar Team
- Red Bull–Bora–Hansgrohe
- Soudal–Quick-Step
- Team Bahrain Victorious
- Team dsm–firmenich PostNL
- Team Jayco–AlUla
- UAE Team Emirates
- Visma–Lease a Bike

UCI ProTeams

- Israel–Premier Tech
- Lotto–Dstny
- Team Novo Nordisk
- Tudor Pro Cycling Team
- Uno-X Mobility

National Teams

- Canada

== Result ==
Result
Rank	Rider	Team	Time
1	Michael Matthews (AUS)	Team Jayco–AlUla	4h 47' 36"
2	Biniam Girmay (ERI)	Intermarché–Wanty	+ 0"
3	Rudy Molard (FRA)	Groupama–FDJ	+ 0"
4	Tiesj Benoot (BEL)	Visma–Lease a Bike	+ 0"
5	Per Strand Hagenes (NOR)	Visma–Lease a Bike	+ 0"
6	Bauke Mollema (NED)	Lidl–Trek	+ 0"
7	Tadej Pogačar (SLO)	UAE Team Emirates	+ 0"
8	Neilson Powless (USA)	EF Education–EasyPost	+ 0"
9	Pello Bilbao (ESP)	Team Bahrain Victorious	+ 0"
10	Edoardo Zambanini (ITA)	Team Bahrain Victorious	+ 0"
