= Grand Prix Cycliste de Québec =

Canadian one-day road cycling race

Race details
- Date: September
- Region: Quebec City, Quebec, Canada
- Local name: Grand Prix Cycliste de Québec
- Discipline: Road
- Competition: UCI World Tour
- Type: One-day race
- Organiser: Évenements GPCQM (AA+ EVT inc)
- Race director: Joseph Limare
- Web site: gpcqm.ca

History
- First edition: 2010
- Editions: 15
- First winner: Thomas Voeckler (FRA)
- Most wins: Michael Matthews (AUS) (3 wins)
- Most recent: Remco Evenepoel (BEL)

The Grand Prix Cycliste de Québec is a one-day professional bicycle road race held in Quebec City, Quebec, Canada. Its first edition was on September 10, 2010, as the penultimate event in the 2010 UCI ProTour.

The Grand Prix Cycliste de Québec and the Grand Prix Cycliste de Montréal held two days later are collectively known as the "Laurentian Classics". Australian cyclist Simon Gerrans was the first to achieve a Laurentian double by winning both races in the same year in 2014. Fellow Australian cyclist Michael Matthews also achieved this double in 2018.

In 2024, organisers noted that they wished to stage a women's race in future, potentially as part of the UCI Women's World Tour.

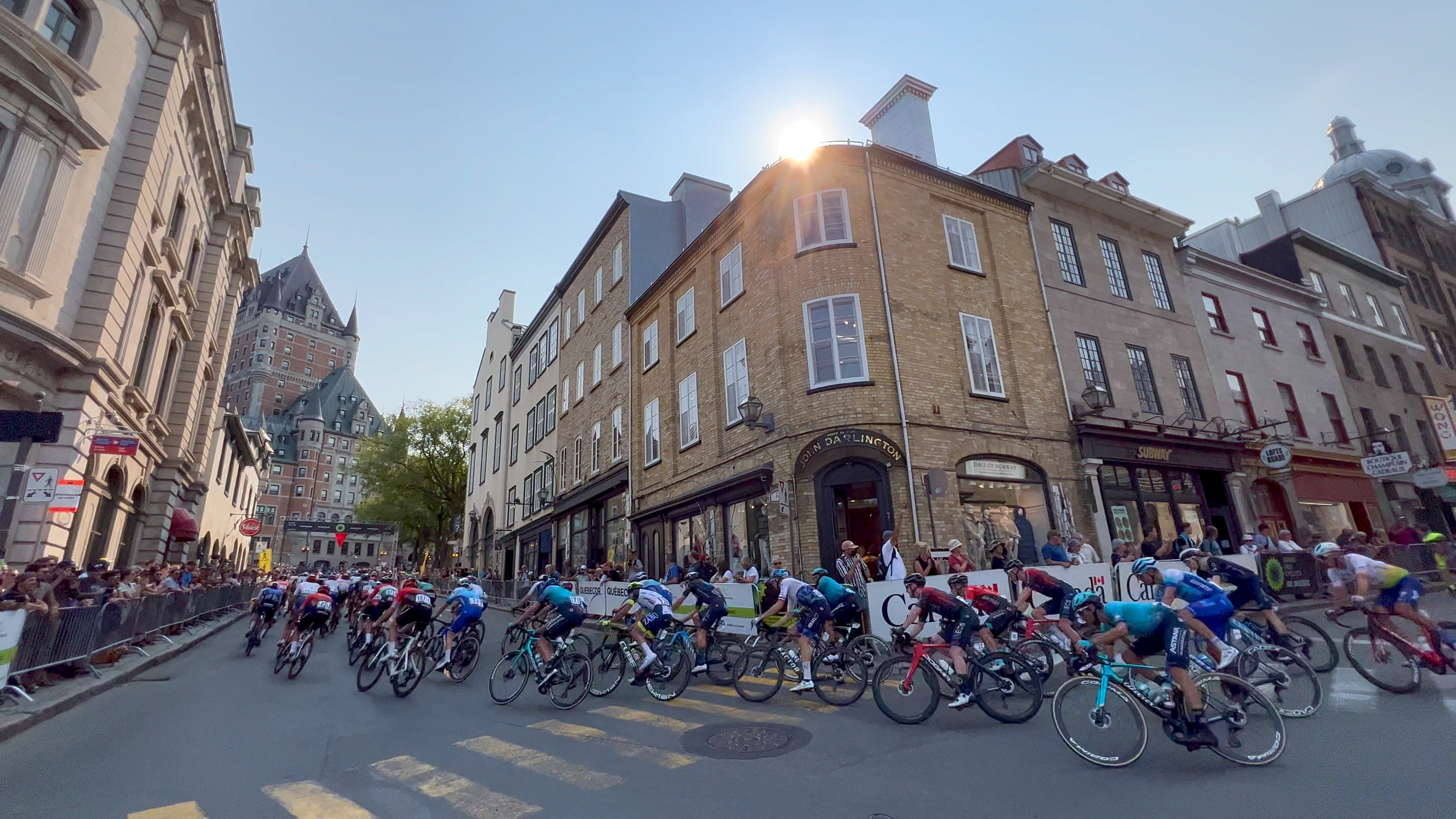
During the 2022 edition of the race

== Route ==
The Grand Prix Cycliste de Québec, unlike many single day events, is not a point to point race, but a circuit based race. The riders race for 11 laps on an 18.1 km long circuit. During a lap on the circuit the riders need to complete four climbs in rapid succession: Côte de la Montagne (375m long and 10% average grade), Côte de la Potasse (420m long and 9% average grade), Montée de la Fabrique (190m long and 7% average grade) and Montée du Fort (1000m long and 4% average grade). The finish is uphill on the Montée du Fort.

During the 2014 edition, riders had to take an alternate route because of construction on the Côte Gilmour.

== Winners ==
Year	Country	Rider	Team
2010	France	Thomas Voeckler	Bbox Bouygues Telecom
2011	Belgium	Philippe Gilbert	Omega Pharma–Lotto
2012	Australia	Simon Gerrans	Orica–GreenEDGE
2013	Netherlands	Robert Gesink	Belkin Pro Cycling
2014	Australia	Simon Gerrans	Orica–GreenEDGE
2015	Colombia	Rigoberto Urán	Etixx–Quick-Step
2016	Slovakia	Peter Sagan	Tinkoff
2017	Slovakia	Peter Sagan	Bora–Hansgrohe
2018	Australia	Michael Matthews	Team Sunweb
2019	Australia	Michael Matthews	Team Sunweb
2020–2021	**No race** due to the COVID-19 pandemic		
2022	France	Benoît Cosnefroy	AG2R Citroën Team
2023	Belgium	Arnaud De Lie	Lotto–Dstny
2024	Australia	Michael Matthews	Team Jayco–AlUla
2025	France	Julian Alaphilippe	Tudor Pro Cycling Team
2026	Belgium	Remco Evenepoel	Red Bull–Bora–Hansgrohe

=== Multiple winners ===
Riders in bold are still active

Wins	Rider	Editions
3	**Michael Matthews (AUS)**	2018, 2019, 2024
2	Simon Gerrans (AUS)	2012, 2014
2	Peter Sagan (SVK)	2016, 2017

=== Wins per country ===
Wins	Country
5	Australia
3	Belgium; France
2	Slovakia
1	Colombia; Netherlands
