= 2019 Grand Prix Cycliste de Québec =

Cycling race

2019 UCI World Tour, race 35 of 38

Race details
- Dates: 13 September 2019
- Stages: 1
- Distance: 201.6 km (125.3 mi)
- Winning time: 5h 13' 01"

Results
	Winner	Michael Matthews (AUS)	(Team Sunweb)
	Second	Peter Sagan (SVK)	(Bora–Hansgrohe)
	Third	Greg Van Avermaet (BEL)	(CCC Team)

The 2019 Grand Prix Cycliste de Québec was a road cycling one-day race that took place on 13 September 2019 in Canada. It was the 10th edition of Grand Prix Cycliste de Québec and the 35th event of the 2019 UCI World Tour. Australian rider Michael Matthews of Team Sunweb won the race for the second year in a row and successfully defended his title.

== Teams ==
Twenty-one teams, which consisted of all eighteen UCI WorldTour teams, two UCI Professional Continental teams, and one national team, participated in the race. Each team entered seven riders except for Lotto–Soudal, who entered six riders. Of the starting peloton of 146 riders, only 128 riders finished the race.

UCI WorldTeams

- AG2R La Mondiale
- Astana
- Bahrain–Merida
- Bora–Hansgrohe
- CCC Team
- Deceuninck–Quick-Step
- EF Education First
- Groupama–FDJ
- Lotto–Soudal
- Mitchelton–Scott
- Movistar Team
- Team Dimension Data
- Team INEOS
- Team Jumbo–Visma
- Team Katusha–Alpecin
- Team Sunweb
- Trek–Segafredo
- UAE Team Emirates

UCI Professional Continental teams

- Israel Cycling Academy
- Rally UHC Cycling

National teams

- Canada

== Results ==
Result
Rank	Rider	Team	Time
1	Michael Matthews (AUS)	Team Sunweb	5h 13' 01"
2	Peter Sagan (SVK)	Bora–Hansgrohe	+ 0"
3	Greg Van Avermaet (BEL)	CCC Team	+ 0"
4	Diego Ulissi (ITA)	UAE Team Emirates	+ 0"
5	Jasper Stuyven (BEL)	Trek–Segafredo	+ 0"
6	Tom-Jelte Slagter (NED)	Team Dimension Data	+ 0"
7	Julian Alaphilippe (FRA)	Deceuninck–Quick-Step	+ 0"
8	Timo Roosen (NED)	Team Jumbo–Visma	+ 0"
9	Tim Wellens (BEL)	Lotto–Soudal	+ 0"
10	Benoît Cosnefroy (FRA)	AG2R La Mondiale	+ 0"
