= Rui Costa (cyclist) =

Portuguese cyclist (born 1986)

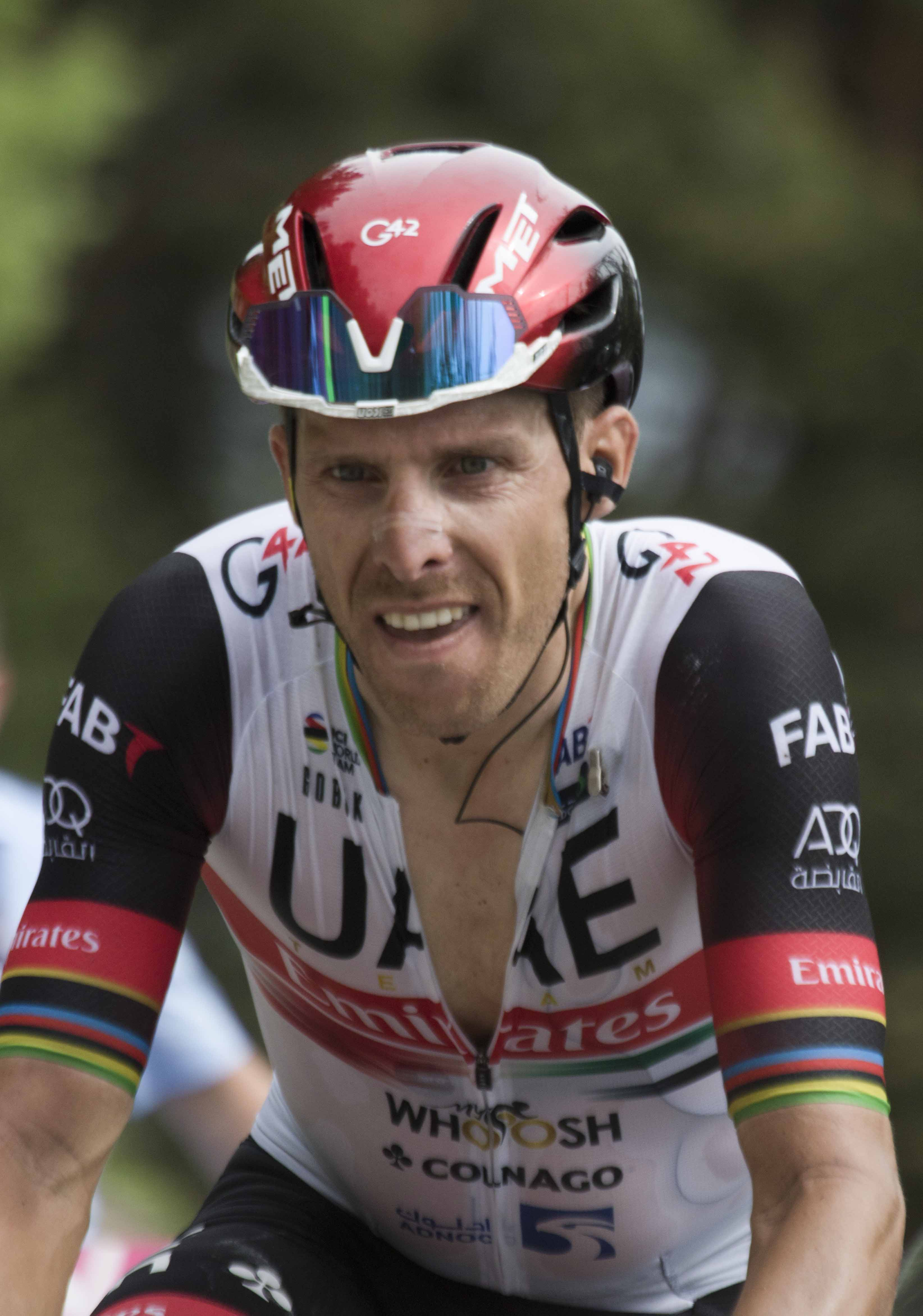
- Costa at the 2022 Giro d'Italia

Personal information
- Full name: Rui Alberto Faria da Costa
- Born: 5 October 1986 (age 40) Póvoa de Varzim, Portugal
- Height: 1.83 m (6 ft 0 in)
- Weight: 69 kg (152 lb)

Cycling career
- Sport: Cycling
- Current team: EF Education–EasyPost
- Discipline: Road
- Role: Rider
- Rider type: All-rounder

Amateur team
- 2005–2006: Santa Maria da Feira–E-Leclerc

Professional teams
- 2007–2008: S.L. Benfica
- 2009–2013: Caisse d'Epargne
- 2014–2022: Lampre–Merida
- 2023: Intermarché–Circus–Wanty
- 2024–: EF Education–EasyPost

Major wins
- Grand Tours Tour de France 3 individual stages (2011, 2013) Vuelta a España 1 individual stage (2023) Stage races Tour de Suisse (2012, 2013, 2014) Abu Dhabi Tour (2017) Four Days of Dunkirk (2009) Vuelta a la Comunidad de Madrid (2011) Volta a la Comunitat Valenciana (2023) One-day races and Classics World Road Race Championships (2013) National Road Race Championships (2015, 2020, 2024) National Time Trial Championships (2010, 2013) GP de Montréal (2011) Japan Cup (2023)
Medal record
Men's road bicycle racing
Representing Portugal
World Championships
Gold medal – first place	2013 Florence	Road race

Rui Alberto Faria da Costa ComIH (born 5 October 1986) is a Portuguese professional road bicycle racer, who rides for UCI WorldTeam EF Education–EasyPost. He is best known for winning the 2013 UCI Road World Championships in Tuscany, Italy (the first Portuguese rider to do so), three stages of the Tour de France in 2011 and 2013, one stage in the Vuelta a España in 2023, and the 2012, 2013 and 2014 editions of the Tour de Suisse, becoming the first cyclist to win the event for three consecutive years.

== Early life and amateur career ==
Born in Aguçadoura, Póvoa de Varzim, Costa started his career at Guilhabreu, a civil parish of Vila do Conde, then went to Santa Maria da Feira.

== Professional career ==
=== 2007–10: Early years ===
Costa became a professional cyclist at Benfica in 2007, and switched to Caisse d'Epargne in 2009. In 2009, Costa won the Four Days of Dunkirk, followed by a win on stage 8 of the 2010 Tour de Suisse.

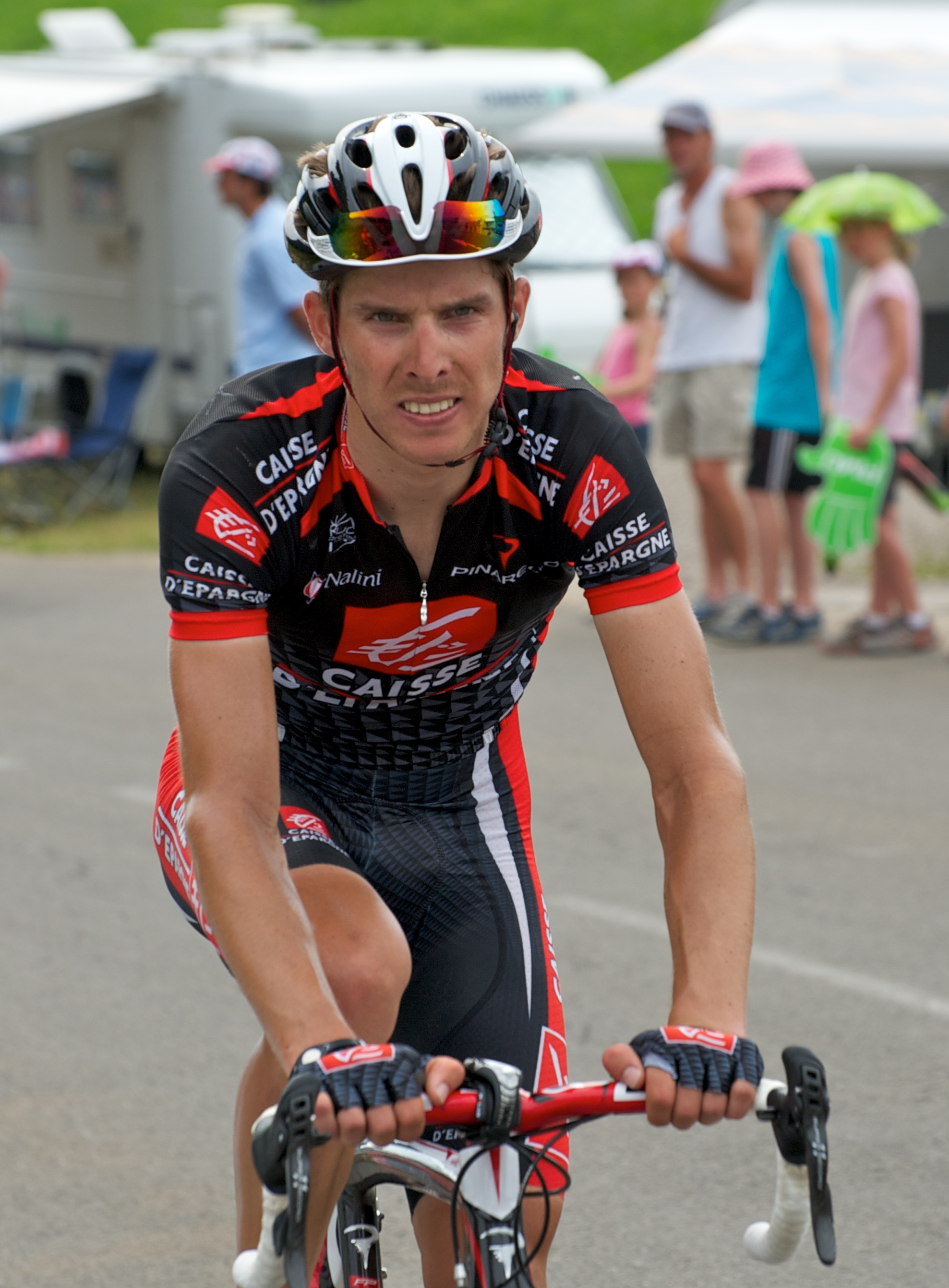
Costa at the 2010 Tour de France

In 2010, Costa was involved in an altercation with Carlos Barredo at the end of Stage 6 of the Tour de France, with Barredo removing his front wheel and attempting to club Costa with it before both riders lobbed blows at each other. Both were fined 300 francs for the incident.

At the Portuguese national championships in June 2010 Costa and his brother Mário tested positive for the banned substance methylhexanamine, which they claimed to have ingested inadvertently due to a tainted food supplement. Further testing proved that to be the case, and he re-signed with his former team, then known as Movistar Team, in April 2011 after five months of suspension.

=== 2011 ===
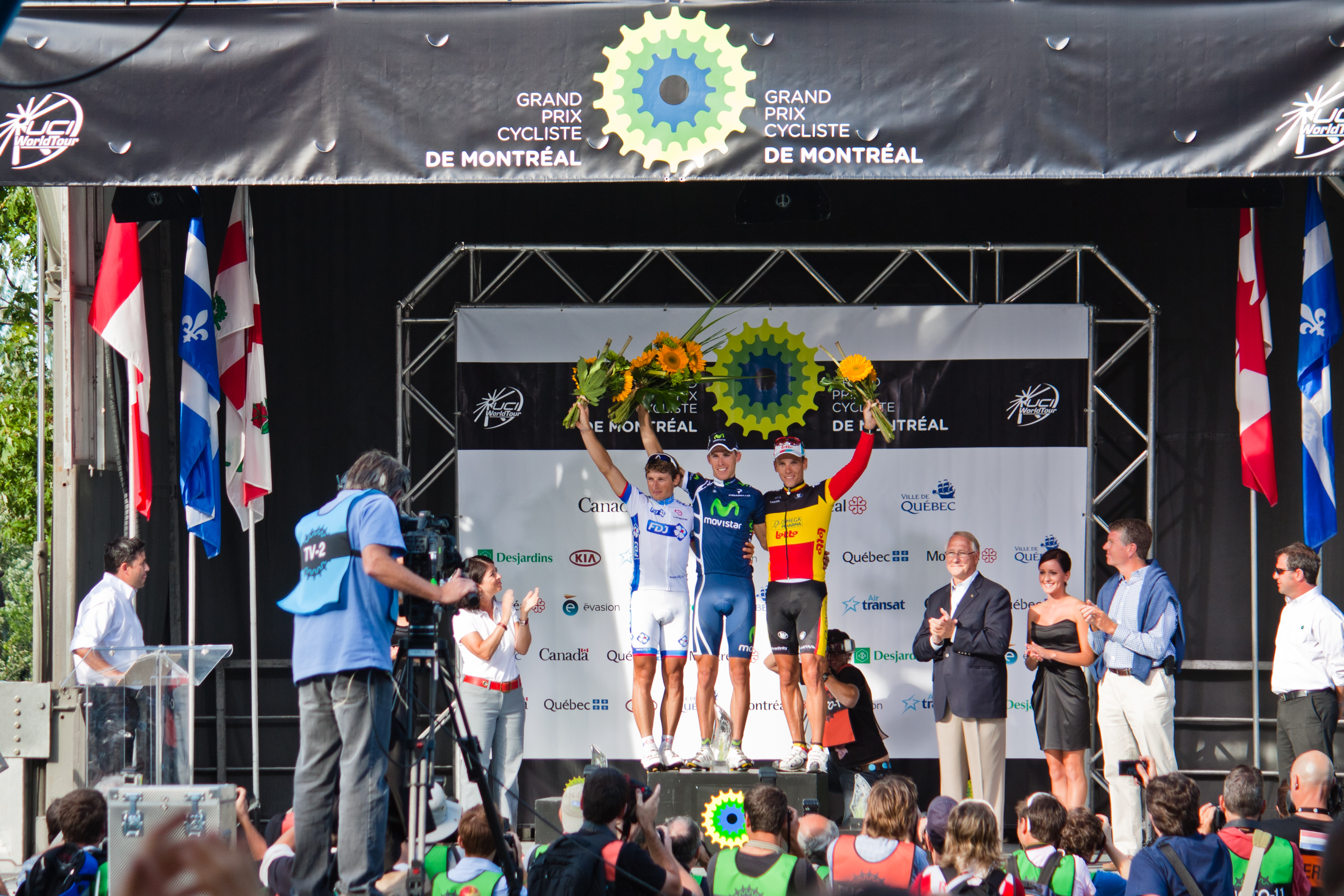
Costa on the podium after winning the 2011 Grand Prix Cycliste de Montréal

In 2011, Costa performed well in the Vuelta a la Comunidad de Madrid: after second places in the first and third stages, he won the overall classification. Later that season, Costa rode away solo to win stage 8 of the Tour de France. Following his previous successes, Costa won the Grand Prix Cycliste de Montréal, sprinting away from a late breakaway, beating breakaway companion Pierrick Fédrigo. Both were chased by Philippe Gilbert, who made a late counter-attack, but came two seconds short.

=== 2012 ===
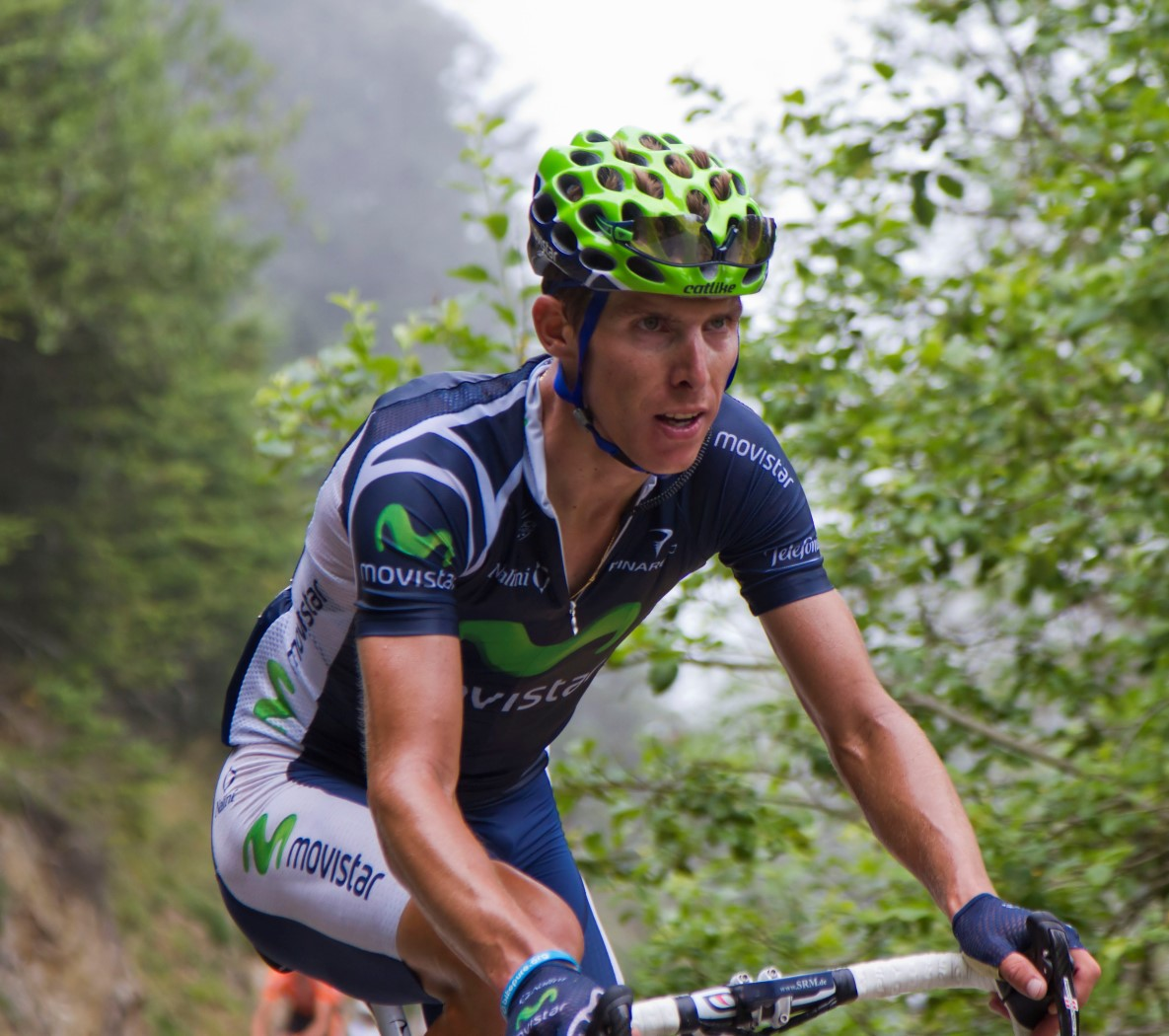
Costa at the 2012 Tour de France

In 2012, Costa finished third in the General classification of the Tour de Romandie. He won stage 2 in the Tour de Suisse, took the race's lead and successfully defended the yellow jersey through the Tour. He hung on to his 14-second overall lead over second-placed Fränk Schleck in the last stage, where Schleck attacked on the slopes of the Glaubenberg Pass. Schleck crested the climb with an advantage of a minute over Costa, but was reeled back in along the descent by the small group containing Costa. The pair finished the stage at the same time. He said after the important win: "I want to dedicate this to the team, because my teammates worked magnificently all week. I have no words to describe it." Costa headed to the Tour de France, slated to ride in support of his leader Alejandro Valverde, but crashes and incidents plagued Valverde, who still managed to grab a stage win and finished 20th overall. Costa placed higher than his captain in the general classification at 18th. He then participated in the GP Ouest-France, where he settled for second place of the French classic. He escaped on the last climb of the day with 5 kilometres (3.1 mi) to go, but Team Sky's Edvald Boasson Hagen passed him in the final kilometre, and Costa protected his second place as the surging peloton crossed the finish line on his heels. In September, he headed to the Canadian province of Quebec to take part in the two World Tour races held there. He took the third step of the podium in the Grand Prix Cycliste de Québec, winning the sprint of a group of 16 riders in hot pursuit of the two escapees, Simon Gerrans and Greg Van Avermaet, who finished four seconds ahead of Costa. Two days later, he aimed at defending his title in the Grand Prix Cycliste de Montréal, but finished eighth, once again with a 4-second deficit over the winner, Lars Petter Nordhaug. He concluded his season in China at the Tour of Beijing, scoring another top ten overall placing with ninth.

=== 2013 ===
In 2013, Costa started the year by winning the Klasika Primavera and finishing third in the Tour de Romandie and also aimed to defend his Tour de Suisse title. He later successfully defended his title after winning stage seven, and then taking the yellow jersey from Mathias Frank after winning the final stage, a hill climb time trial. In the Tour de France, Costa left the Pyrenees inside the top ten. On stage 13, Costa lost close to ten minutes after going back to try to help his team leader, Valverde, who suffered a puncture. On stage 16, Costa ended up on a breakaway where he attacked on the last climb of the day, the Col de Manse before the final downhill to a solo finish in Gap. He was also awarded the combativity prize of that stage. A few days later, Costa won stage 19 after escaping from the lead group on the Col de la Croix Fry; he ended up with another solo finish in Le Grand-Bornand.

Costa won the elite men's race at the UCI Road World Championships in Tuscany, Italy, becoming the first Portuguese rider to wear the rainbow jersey. After the race, Costa said: "After the Tour, the goal was to reach the World Cup in the best possible conditions and make a good race. But I never thought I could win a race as important as this. It means everything to me. It is the reward for a lifetime of effort and hard work."

=== 2014–22: Lampre–Merida ===
Costa left the Movistar Team at the end of the 2013 season, and joined Lampre–Merida for the 2014 season.

==== 2014 ====
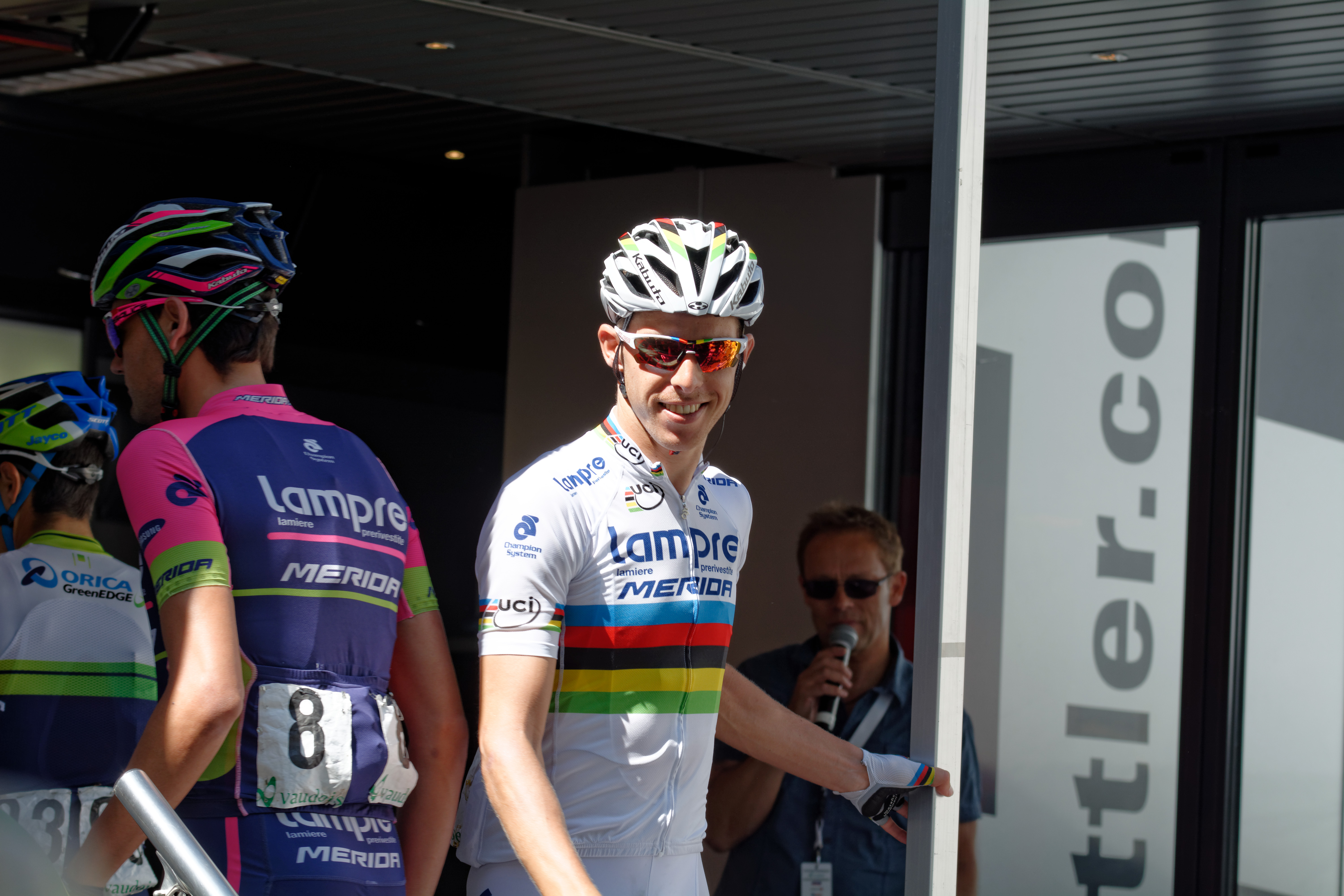
Costa, wearing the rainbow jersey as the incumbent world champion, at the 2014 Tour de Suisse

Costa started the 2014 season by taking third place and the points classification jersey in the Volta ao Algarve. He then finished second overall in Paris–Nice and, for the third consecutive year, claimed third place in the Tour de Romandie. Costa's first win of the season in the world champion's rainbow jersey occurred in the last stage of the Tour de Suisse. With this victory, Costa took the yellow jersey from Tony Martin and successfully defended his title, thus becoming the first cyclist to win Tour de Suisse three consecutive times.

Costa entered the Tour de France with high hopes, aiming for a podium finish, but started to lose touch with the front riders due to bronchitis. During the second rest day, his health condition worsened and he was diagnosed with bronchopneumonia. Ranked 13th in the general classification, Costa was forced to withdraw from the Tour. He returned to UCI World Tour competition at the GP Ouest-France, crossing the finish line in 92nd place, 11 seconds behind winner Sylvain Chavanel. Costa then competed in the Grand Prix Cycliste de Québec and the Grand Prix Cycliste de Montréal, securing a runner-up place in the latter race, behind Simon Gerrans.

Costa went to the UCI Road World Championships in Ponferrada, Spain, with the aim of defending his road race title; he finished in 23rd place, seven seconds behind the winner and his successor, Michał Kwiatkowski of Poland.

==== 2015 ====
Costa took fourth place in the general classification of Paris–Nice as a first notable result, thanks in part to a third place on the time trial up Col d'Èze. He finished seventh in the mountainous World Tour race, the Tour of the Basque Country. He also grabbed the fourth place in the Amstel Gold Race, where Michał Kwiatkowski imposed himself; a week later he would come again in fourth place at Liège–Bastogne–Liège. He decided not to go defend his title at the Tour de Suisse, which he had won three times in a row. He participated in the concurrent Critérium du Dauphiné instead. Costa won the sixth stage of the race after being in the breakaway for most of the day, passing Vincenzo Nibali near the finish line. A week before the Tour de France, Costa won the Portuguese National Road Race Championships. At the Tour de France, he retired due to injuries picked up in a crash, leading him to announce he would ride for stage wins in the future.

==== 2017 ====
He was named in the start list for the 2017 Giro d'Italia.

== Career achievements ==
=== Major results ===
2007
1st Overall Giro delle Regioni
2008
2nd Overall Giro delle Regioni

1st Stage 4

2nd Overall Coupe des nations Ville Saguenay

1st Stage 4 (ITT)

2nd Overall Tour de l'Avenir
UCI Under-23 Road World Championships

5th Road race
8th Time trial

5th Overall Clásica Internacional de Alcobendas
2009 (2 pro wins)
1st Overall Four Days of Dunkirk

1st Young rider classification

2nd Road race, National Road Championships
3rd Overall Vuelta a Chihuahua

1st Mountains classification
1st Stage 3

2010 (3)
1st Time trial, National Road Championships
1st Trofeo Deià
1st Stage 8 Tour de Suisse
2nd Overall Four Days of Dunkirk

1st Young rider classification

6th Overall Volta ao Algarve
2011 (3)
1st Overall Vuelta a la Comunidad de Madrid

1st Points classification

1st Grand Prix Cycliste de Montréal
1st Stage 8 Tour de France
4th Overall Circuit de Lorraine
2012 (2)
1st Overall Tour de Suisse

1st Stage 2

2nd GP Ouest–France
2nd Trofeo Deià
3rd Overall Tour de Romandie
3rd Grand Prix Cycliste de Québec
4th GP Miguel Induráin
5th Overall Volta ao Algarve
7th Overall Tour du Poitou-Charentes
8th Grand Prix Cycliste de Montréal
9th Overall Tour of Beijing
10th UCI World Tour
2013 (8)
1st Road race, UCI Road World Championships
1st Time trial, National Road Championships
1st Overall Tour de Suisse

1st Stages 7 & 9 (ITT)

1st Klasika Primavera
Tour de France

1st Stages 16 & 19
Combativity award Stage 16

3rd Overall Tour de Romandie
4th Overall Tour of Beijing
4th Trofeo Serra de Tramuntana
5th Overall Volta ao Algarve
5th Grand Prix Cycliste de Québec
6th Grand Prix Cycliste de Montréal
9th UCI World Tour
9th Liège–Bastogne–Liège
2014 (2)
1st Overall Tour de Suisse

1st Stage 9

2nd Time trial, National Road Championships
2nd Overall Paris–Nice
2nd Grand Prix Cycliste de Montréal
3rd Overall Tour de Romandie
3rd Overall Volta ao Algarve

1st Points classification

3rd Giro di Lombardia
4th UCI World Tour
4th Overall Tour of Beijing
2015 (2)
1st Road race, National Road Championships
3rd Overall Critérium du Dauphiné

1st Stage 6

3rd Grand Prix Cycliste de Montréal
4th Overall Paris–Nice
4th Liège–Bastogne–Liège
4th Amstel Gold Race
7th Overall Tour of the Basque Country
9th UCI World Tour
9th Road race, UCI Road World Championships
2016
3rd Liège–Bastogne–Liège
5th Overall Tour of Oman
6th Road race, UEC European Road Championships
6th Overall Tour de Romandie
7th Overall Tour of the Basque Country
7th Overall Tour de Suisse
10th Road race, Olympic Games
10th Overall Paris–Nice
10th La Flèche Wallonne
Combativity award Stage 19 Tour de France
2017 (3)
1st Overall Abu Dhabi Tour

1st Stage 3

2nd Overall Tour of Oman
5th Overall Tour de Suisse
5th Overall Vuelta a San Juan

1st Stage 5

10th Overall Tour de Pologne
2018
5th Overall Tour de Romandie
6th Grand Prix Cycliste de Montréal
8th Overall Abu Dhabi Tour
10th Road race, UCI Road World Championships
10th Overall Tour of Oman
2019
2nd Overall Tour de Romandie
4th Overall Tour of Oman
7th Grand Prix Cycliste de Montréal
10th Road race, UCI Road World Championships
10th Overall Tirreno–Adriatico
10th Overall Volta a la Comunitat Valenciana
10th Overall Vuelta a Burgos
2020 (2)
National Road Championships

1st Road race
2nd Time trial

3rd Overall Saudi Tour

1st Stage 1

3rd Overall Tour du Limousin
4th Overall Volta ao Algarve
10th Overall Tour de Pologne
2021
2nd Grand Prix of Aargau Canton
7th Overall Tour de Suisse
2022
3rd Overall Tour of Oman
3rd Overall Saudi Tour
10th Overall Tour du Limousin
2023 (5)
1st Overall Volta a la Comunitat Valenciana

1st Stage 5

1st Japan Cup
1st Trofeo Calvià
1st Stage 15 Vuelta a España
2nd La Drôme Classic
4th Strade Bianche
4th Figueira Champions Classic
5th Gran Piemonte
8th Clásica de San Sebastián
9th Ardèche Classic
10th Overall Volta ao Algarve
2024 (1)
National Road Championships

1st Road race
3rd Time trial

6th Trofeo Calvià
10th Grand Prix of Aargau Canton
2025
2nd Trofeo Matteotti
5th Figueira Champions Classic

==== General classification results timeline ====
Grand Tour general classification results
Grand Tour	2009	2010	2011	2012	2013	2014	2015	2016	2017	2018	2019	2020	2021	2022	2023	2024
Giro d'Italia	—	—	—	—	—	—	—	—	27	—	—	—	—	44	—	—
Tour de France	DNF	73	90	18	27	DNF	DNF	49	—	—	53	—	77	—	67	68
/ Vuelta a España	—	—	—	—	—	—	—	—	43	—	—	44	—	—	41	DNF
Major stage race general classification results
Major stage race	2009	2010	2011	2012	2013	2014	2015	2016	2017	2018	2019	2020	2021	2022	2023	2024
Paris–Nice	—	—	—	—	DNF	2	4	10	—	DNF	—	—	55	—	—	—
Tirreno–Adriatico	145	60	—	29	—	—	—	—	18	—	10	28	—	—	—	—
Volta a Catalunya	—	—	—	—	—	—	—	—	—	—	—	NH	DNF	69	—	—
Tour of the Basque Country	—	—	—	15	13	51	7	7	—	12	—	NH	—	—	DNF	—
Tour de Romandie	—	—	18	3	3	3	25	6	—	5	2	NH	13	—	DNF	—
Critérium du Dauphiné	—	—	43	—	—	—	3	—	—	—	—	—	—	—	—	—
Tour de Suisse	13	34	—	1	1	1	—	7	5	—	56	NH	7	DNF	DNF	38

==== Classics results timeline ====
Monument	2009	2010	2011	2012	2013	2014	2015	2016	2017	2018	2019	2020	2021	2022	2023	2024
Milan–San Remo	79	49	—	51	—	—	DNF	—	—	—	—	—	—	—	—	—
Tour of Flanders	113	DNF	—	—	—	—	—	—	—	—	—	—	—	—	—	—
Paris–Roubaix	58	DNF	—	—	—	—	—	—	—	—	—	NH	—	—	—	—
Liège–Bastogne–Liège	DNF	—	DNF	17	9	DNF	4	3	14	22	DNF	40	63	—	31	—
Giro di Lombardia	26	—	25	38	38	3	46	15	54	38	DNF	—	—	—	13	DNF
Classic	2009	2010	2011	2012	2013	2014	2015	2016	2017	2018	2019	2020	2021	2022	2023	2024
Strade Bianche	—	—	—	47	—	—	—	—	—	—	DNF	39	—	—	4	—
Amstel Gold Race	120	—	DNF	19	DNF	17	4	17	38	27	13	NH	54	—	32	—
La Flèche Wallonne	—	—	DNF	18	32	53	28	10	31	19	26	85	DNS	—	—	—
Clásica de San Sebastián	—	—	99	—	—	—	95	—	—	—	49	NH	—	44	8	—
Bretagne Classic	—	—	51	2	69	92	26	31	—	30	—	DNF	—	—	—	—
Grand Prix Cycliste de Québec	NH	—	11	3	5	33	24	13	—	16	41	Not held		102	—	—
Grand Prix Cycliste de Montréal	NH	—	1	8	6	2	3	49	—	6	7	Not held		DNF	—	—

==== Major championships timeline ====
Event		2009	2010	2011	2012	2013	2014	2015	2016	2017	2018	2019	2020	2021	2022	2023	2024
Olympic Games	Road race	Not held			13	Not held			10	Not held				—	Not held		46
Olympic Games	Time trial	Not held			—	Not held			—	Not held				—	Not held		25
World Championships	Road race	69	—	15	11	1	23	9	—	19	10	10	26	—	—	—	42
World Championships	Time trial	—	—	49	—	—	—	—	—	33	—	—	—	—	—	—	—
European Championships	Road race	Race did not exist							6	—	DNF	—	29	18	—	—	—
European Championships	Time trial	Race did not exist							—	—	—	—	11	—	—	—	—
National Championships	Road race	2	DSQ	—	—	11	—	1	—	—	—	—	1	—	—	—	1
National Championships	Time trial	—	DSQ	—	—	1	2	8	—	—	—	—	2	—	—	—	3

Legend
—	Did not compete
DNF	Did not finish
DNS	Did not start
DSQ	Disqualified
IP	In progress
NH	Not held

=== Awards ===
- Portuguese Sportsman of the Year (Prémio Desportista Masculino do Ano): 2012, 2013, 2014

Awards
Preceded by Hélder Rodrigues	Portuguese Sportsman of the Year; 2012–2014	Succeeded by Miguel Oliveira
