= 2004 GP Miguel Induráin =

Race details
- Dates: 3 April 2004
- Stages: 1
- Distance: 189 km (117.4 mi)
- Winning time: 4h 49' 58"

Results
	Winner	Matthias Kessler (GER)
	Second	Miguel Ángel Perdiguero (ESP)
	Third	Daniele Righi (ITA)

The 2004 GP Miguel Induráin was the 51st edition of the GP Miguel Induráin cycle race and was held on 3 April 2004. The race was won by Matthias Kessler.

== General classification ==
Final general classification

Rank	Rider	Time
1	Matthias Kessler (GER)	4h 49' 58"
2	Miguel Ángel Perdiguero (ESP)	+ 0"
3	Daniele Righi (ITA)	+ 0"
4	Ángel Vicioso (ESP)	+ 0"
5	Iván Gutiérrez (ESP)	+ 0"
6	Fabian Wegmann (GER)	+ 0"
7	Jérôme Pineau (FRA)	+ 0"
8	Jorge Ferrío (ESP)	+ 0"
9	Vladimir Karpets (RUS)	+ 0"
10	Alejandro Valverde (ESP)	+ 0"
