= 2019 Volta a la Comunitat Valenciana =

2019 UCI Europe Tour

Race details
- Dates: 6–10 February 2019
- Stages: 5
- Distance: 647 km (402 mi)
- Winning time: 16h 08' 44"

Results
	Winner	Ion Izagirre (ESP)
	Second	Alejandro Valverde (ESP)
	Third	Pello Bilbao (ESP)
	Mountains	Diego Rubio (ESP)
	Young rider	Sergio Higuita (COL)
	Team	Astana

The 70th edition of the Volta a la Comunitat Valenciana (English: Tour of the Valencian Community) was a road cycling stage race held from 6 to 10 February 2019. It was run over five stages, of which one was a time trial, covering a total distance of 647 km. It was a 2.1 event on the 2019 UCI Europe Tour. The race was run entirely in the autonomous community of Valencia, starting in Orihuela and finishing in Valencia.

The race was won by Spaniard Ion Izagirre of the Astana team. Alejandro Valverde and Pello Bilbao, also from Spain, finished second and third.

== Teams ==
Twenty-four teams started the race. Each team had a maximum of seven riders:

UCI WorldTeams

- Movistar Team
- UAE Team Emirates
- Team Katusha–Alpecin
- Bahrain–Merida
- Team Jumbo–Visma
- CCC Team
- Mitchelton–Scott
- AG2R La Mondiale
- Astana
- Team Dimension Data
- Team Sky

UCI Professional teams

- Cofidis
- Burgos BH
- Gazprom–RusVelo
- Rally UHC Cycling
- W52 / FC Porto
- Caja Rural–Seguros RGA
- Israel Cycling Academy
- Euskadi–Murias
- Nippo–Vini Fantini–Faizanè
- Sport Vlaanderen–Baloise
- Direct Énergie

UCI Continental teams

- Fundación Euskadi
- Kometa Cycling Team

== Route ==
Stage characteristics and winners
Stage	Date	Course	Distance	Type	Stage winner
1	6 February	Orihuela to Orihuela	10.2 km (6.3 mi)	Individual time trial	Edvald Boasson Hagen (NOR)
2	7 February	Alicante to Alicante	166 km (103 mi)	Medium mountain stage	Matteo Trentin (ITA)
3	8 February	Quart de Poblet to Chera	194.3 km (120.7 mi)	Medium mountain stage	Greg Van Avermaet (BEL)
4	9 February	Villarreal to Alcossebre	188 km (117 mi)	Mountain stage	Adam Yates (GBR)
5	10 February	Paterna to Valencia	88.5 km (55.0 mi)	Flat stage	Dylan Groenewegen (NED)

== Stages ==
=== Stage 1 ===
Stage 1 result

Rank	Rider	Team	Time
1	Edvald Boasson Hagen (NOR)	Team Dimension Data	12' 55"
2	Ion Izagirre (ESP)	Astana	+ 5"
3	Tony Martin (GER)	Team Jumbo–Visma	+ 7"
4	Dylan Teuns (BEL)	Bahrain–Merida	+ 8"
5	Jos van Emden (NED)	Team Jumbo–Visma	+ 10"
6	Nelson Oliveira (POR)	Movistar Team	+ 11"
7	Pello Bilbao (ESP)	Astana	+ 12"
8	Alejandro Valverde (ESP)	Movistar Team	+ 14"
9	Jan Tratnik (SLO)	Bahrain–Merida	+ 18"
10	Dan Martin (IRL)	UAE Team Emirates	+ 19"

General classification after Stage 1

Rank	Rider	Team	Time
1	Edvald Boasson Hagen (NOR)	Team Dimension Data	12' 55"
2	Ion Izagirre (ESP)	Astana	+ 5"
3	Tony Martin (GER)	Team Jumbo–Visma	+ 7"
4	Dylan Teuns (BEL)	Bahrain–Merida	+ 8"
5	Jos van Emden (NED)	Team Jumbo–Visma	+ 10"
6	Nelson Oliveira (POR)	Movistar Team	+ 11"
7	Pello Bilbao (ESP)	Astana	+ 12"
8	Alejandro Valverde (ESP)	Movistar Team	+ 14"
9	Jan Tratnik (SLO)	Bahrain–Merida	+ 18"
10	Dan Martin (IRL)	UAE Team Emirates	+ 19"

=== Stage 2 ===
Stage 2 result

Rank	Rider	Team	Time
1	Matteo Trentin (ITA)	Mitchelton–Scott	4h 10' 12"
2	Nacer Bouhanni (FRA)	Cofidis	s.t.
3	Ben Swift (GBR)	Team Sky	s.t.
4	Sonny Colbrelli (ITA)	Bahrain–Merida	s.t.
5	Alexander Kristoff (NOR)	UAE Team Emirates	s.t.
6	Edvald Boasson Hagen (NOR)	Team Dimension Data	s.t.
7	Thomas Boudat (FRA)	Direct Énergie	s.t.
8	Sondre Holst Enger (NOR)	Israel Cycling Academy	s.t.
9	Enrique Sanz (ESP)	Euskadi–Murias	s.t.
10	Chris Lawless (GBR)	Team Sky	s.t.

General classification after Stage 2

Rank	Rider	Team	Time
1	Edvald Boasson Hagen (NOR)	Team Dimension Data	4h 23' 07"
2	Ion Izagirre (ESP)	Astana	+ 5"
3	Tony Martin (GER)	Team Jumbo–Visma	+ 7"
4	Dylan Teuns (BEL)	Bahrain–Merida	+ 8"
5	Nelson Oliveira (POR)	Movistar Team	+ 11"
6	Pello Bilbao (ESP)	Astana	+ 12"
7	Alejandro Valverde (ESP)	Movistar Team	+ 14"
8	Jan Tratnik (SLO)	Bahrain–Merida	+ 18"
9	Dan Martin (IRL)	UAE Team Emirates	+ 19"
10	Diego Rosa (ITA)	Team Sky	+ 20"

=== Stage 3 ===
Stage 3 result

Rank	Rider	Team	Time
1	Greg Van Avermaet (BEL)	CCC Team	5h 00' 16"
2	Matteo Trentin (ITA)	Mitchelton–Scott	s.t.
3	Luis León Sánchez (ESP)	Astana	s.t.
4	Alejandro Valverde (ESP)	Movistar Team	s.t.
5	Mike Teunissen (NED)	Team Jumbo–Visma	s.t.
6	Sergio Higuita (COL)	Fundación Euskadi	s.t.
7	Ben Swift (GBR)	Team Sky	s.t.
8	Sonny Colbrelli (ITA)	Bahrain–Merida	s.t.
9	Ion Izagirre (ESP)	Astana	s.t.
10	Marco Canola (ITA)	Nippo–Vini Fantini–Faizanè	s.t.

General classification after Stage 3

Rank	Rider	Team	Time
1	Edvald Boasson Hagen (NOR)	Team Dimension Data	9h 23' 23"
2	Ion Izagirre (ESP)	Astana	+ 5"
3	Dylan Teuns (BEL)	Bahrain–Merida	+ 8"
4	Nelson Oliveira (POR)	Movistar Team	+ 11"
5	Pello Bilbao (ESP)	Astana	+ 12"
6	Alejandro Valverde (ESP)	Movistar Team	+ 14"
7	Dan Martin (IRL)	UAE Team Emirates	+ 19"
8	Diego Rosa (ITA)	Team Sky	+ 20"
9	Jack Haig (AUS)	Mitchelton–Scott	+ 23"
10	Jesús Herrada (ESP)	Cofidis	+ 24"

=== Stage 4 ===
Stage 4 result

Rank	Rider	Team	Time
1	Adam Yates (GBR)	Mitchelton–Scott	4h 54' 57"
2	Alejandro Valverde (ESP)	Movistar Team	s.t.
3	Pello Bilbao (ESP)	Astana	+ 2"
4	Ion Izagirre (ESP)	Astana	s.t.
5	Dan Martin (IRL)	UAE Team Emirates	+ 4"
6	Sergio Higuita (COL)	Fundación Euskadi	+ 5"
7	Jesús Herrada (ESP)	Cofidis	+ 12"
8	Dylan Teuns (BEL)	Bahrain–Merida	+ 17"
9	Jack Haig (AUS)	Mitchelton–Scott	s.t.
10	Ben Hermans (BEL)	Israel Cycling Academy	+ 25"

General classification after Stage 4

Rank	Rider	Team	Time
1	Ion Izagirre (ESP)	Astana	14h 18' 27"
2	Alejandro Valverde (ESP)	Movistar Team	+ 7"
3	Pello Bilbao (ESP)	Astana	s.t.
4	Dan Martin (IRL)	UAE Team Emirates	+ 16"
5	Dylan Teuns (BEL)	Bahrain–Merida	+ 18"
6	Jesús Herrada (ESP)	Cofidis	+ 29"
7	Jack Haig (AUS)	Mitchelton–Scott	+ 33"
8	Adam Yates (GBR)	Mitchelton–Scott	+ 34"
9	Edvald Boasson Hagen (NOR)	Team Dimension Data	+ 46"
10	Rui Costa (POR)	UAE Team Emirates	+ 48"

=== Stage 5 ===
Stage 5 result

Rank	Rider	Team	Time
1	Dylan Groenewegen (NED)	Team Jumbo–Visma	1h 50' 17"
2	Alexander Kristoff (NOR)	UAE Team Emirates	s.t.
3	Matteo Trentin (ITA)	Mitchelton–Scott	s.t.
4	Luka Mezgec (SLO)	Mitchelton–Scott	s.t.
5	Nacer Bouhanni (FRA)	Cofidis	s.t.
6	Michele Gazzoli (ITA)	Kometa Cycling Team	s.t.
7	Sondre Holst Enger (NOR)	Israel Cycling Academy	s.t.
8	Sonny Colbrelli (ITA)	Bahrain–Merida	s.t.
9	Edvald Boasson Hagen (NOR)	Team Dimension Data	s.t.
10	Giovanni Lonardi (ITA)	Nippo–Vini Fantini–Faizanè	s.t.

== Classifications ==
Final general classification

Rank	Rider	Team	Time
1	Ion Izagirre (ESP)	Astana	16h 08' 44"
2	Alejandro Valverde (ESP)	Movistar Team	+ 7"
3	Pello Bilbao (ESP)	Astana	s.t.
4	Dan Martin (IRL)	UAE Team Emirates	+ 16"
5	Dylan Teuns (BEL)	Bahrain–Merida	+ 18"
6	Jesús Herrada (ESP)	Cofidis	+ 29"
7	Jack Haig (AUS)	Mitchelton–Scott	+ 33"
8	Adam Yates (GBR)	Mitchelton–Scott	+ 34"
9	Edvald Boasson Hagen (NOR)	Team Dimension Data	+ 46"
10	Rui Costa (POR)	UAE Team Emirates	+ 48"

Final mountains classification

Rank	Rider	Team	Points
1	Diego Rubio (ESP)	Burgos BH	41
2	Silvan Dillier (SUI)	AG2R La Mondiale	18
3	Preben Van Hecke (BEL)	Sport Vlaanderen–Baloise	18
4	João Rodrigues (POR)	W52 / FC Porto	12
5	Adam Yates (GBR)	Mitchelton–Scott	6
6	Mikel Iturria (ESP)	Euskadi–Murias	6
7	Alejandro Valverde (ESP)	Movistar Team	4
8	Joan Bou (ESP)	Nippo–Vini Fantini–Faizanè	4
9	Nelson Oliveira (POR)	Movistar Team	3
10	Luis León Sánchez (ESP)	Astana	3

Final young rider classification

Rank	Rider	Team	Time
1	Sergio Higuita (ESP)	Fundación Euskadi	16h 09' 50"
2	Aleksandr Vlasov (RUS)	Gazprom–RusVelo	+ 11"
3	Steff Cras (BEL)	Team Katusha–Alpecin	+ 39"
4	Juan Pedro López (ESP)	Kometa Cycling Team	+ 1' 20"
5	Matej Mohorič (SLO)	Bahrain–Merida	+ 2' 00"
6	Kevin Deltombe (BEL)	Sport Vlaanderen–Baloise	+ 2' 10"
7	Nicola Bagioli (ITA)	Nippo–Vini Fantini–Faizanè	+ 2' 17"
8	Gonzalo Serrano (ESP)	Caja Rural–Seguros RGA	+ 2' 36"
9	Iván García (ESP)	Bahrain–Merida	+ 2' 50"
10	Sergio Samitier (ESP)	Euskadi–Murias	+ 2' 55"

Final teams classification

Rank	Team	Time
1	Astana	48h 27' 22"
2	Team Sky	+ 2' 25"
3	Mitchelton–Scott	+ 3' 33"
4	Bahrain–Merida	+ 3' 51"
5	CCC Team	+ 3' 52"
6	Movistar Team	+ 5' 25"
7	Cofidis	+ 6' 28"
8	Team Dimension Data	+ 7' 32"
9	Fundación Euskadi	+ 7' 34"
10	Nippo–Vini Fantini–Faizanè	+ 8' 18"
