= 2023 Japan Cup =

2023 UCI ProSeries

Race details
- Dates: 15 October 2023
- Stages: 1
- Distance: 133.9 km (83.2 mi)
- Winning time: 3h 28' 22"

Results
| | Winner | Rui Costa (POR) | (Intermarché–Circus–Wanty) |
| | Second | Felix Engelhardt (GER) | (Team Jayco–AlUla) |
| | Third | Guillaume Martin (FRA) | (Cofidis) |

The 2023 Japan Cup was the 30th edition of the Japan Cup single-day cycling race. It was held on 15 October 2023, over a distance of 133.9 km, starting and finishing in Utsunomiya.

It was shortened from the planned 164.8 km due to the bad weather condition.

The race was won by Rui Costa of Intermarché–Circus–Wanty.

== Teams ==
Seven UCI WorldTeams, three UCI ProTeams, eight UCI Continental teams and the Japanese national team made up the nineteen teams that participated in the race.

UCI WorldTeams

- Cofidis
- EF Education–EasyPost
- Intermarché–Circus–Wanty
- Lidl–Trek
- Soudal–Quick-Step
- Team Bahrain Victorious
- Team Jayco–AlUla

UCI ProTeams

- Israel–Premier Tech
- Lotto–Dstny
- Team Novo Nordisk

UCI Continental teams

- Aisan Racing Team
- JCL Team Ukyo
- Kinan Racing Team
- Levante Fuji Shizuoka
- Ljubljana Gusto Santic
- Matrix Powertag
- Victoire Hiroshima
- Utsunomiya Blitzen

National team

- Japan

== Results ==
Result
| Rank | Rider | Team | Time |
|---|---|---|---|
| 1 | Rui Costa (POR) | Intermarché–Circus–Wanty | 3h 28' 22" |
| 2 | Felix Engelhardt (GER) | Team Jayco–AlUla | + 0" |
| 3 | Guillaume Martin (FRA) | Cofidis | + 2" |
| 4 | Maxim Van Gils (BEL) | Lotto–Dstny | + 27" |
| 5 | Georg Zimmermann (GER) | Intermarché–Circus–Wanty | + 1' 34" |
| 6 | Riley Sheehan (USA) | Israel–Premier Tech | + 1' 34" |
| 7 | Axel Zingle (FRA) | Cofidis | + 1' 34" |
| 8 | Lorenzo Rota (ITA) | Intermarché–Circus–Wanty | + 1' 34" |
| 9 | Michael Valgren (DEN) | EF Education–EasyPost | + 1' 34" |
| 10 | Julien Bernard (FRA) | Lidl–Trek | + 1' 39" |
