= 2003 GP Miguel Induráin =

Race details
- Dates: 5 April 2003
- Stages: 1
- Distance: 186 km (115.6 mi)
- Winning time: 5h 02' 05"

Results
	Winner	Matthias Kessler (GER)
	Second	Ángel Vicioso (ESP)
	Third	David Etxebarria (ESP)

The 2003 GP Miguel Induráin was the 50th edition of the GP Miguel Induráin cycle race and was held on 5 April 2003. The race was won by Matthias Kessler.

== General classification ==
Final general classification

Rank	Rider	Time
1	Matthias Kessler (GER)	5h 02' 05"
2	Ángel Vicioso (ESP)	+ 0"
3	David Etxebarria (ESP)	+ 0"
4	Alexandre Moos (SUI)	+ 0"
5	Davide Rebellin (ITA)	+ 0"
6	Antonio Colom (ESP)	+ 0"
7	Ricardo Serrano (ESP)	+ 0"
8	Wladimir Belli (ITA)	+ 0"
9	Bingen Fernández (ESP)	+ 0"
10	Carlos Torrent (ESP)	+ 0"
