= 2013 GP Miguel Induráin =

Race details
- Dates: 30 March 2013
- Stages: 1
- Distance: 181.3 km (112.7 mi)
- Winning time: 4h 50' 46"

Results
| | Winner | Simon Špilak (SLO) |
| | Second | Igor Antón (ESP) |
| | Third | Peter Stetina (USA) |

The 2013 GP Miguel Induráin was the 60th edition of the GP Miguel Induráin cycle race and was held on 30 March 2013. The race started and finished in Estella. The race was won by Simon Špilak.

== General classification ==
Final general classification

| Rank | Rider | Time |
|---|---|---|
| 1 | Simon Špilak (SLO) | 4h 50' 46" |
| 2 | Igor Antón (ESP) | + 1' 32" |
| 3 | Peter Stetina (USA) | + 1' 34" |
| 4 | Alejandro Valverde (ESP) | + 1' 49" |
| 5 | Giampaolo Caruso (ITA) | + 1' 49" |
| 6 | Roman Kreuziger (CZE) | + 1' 54" |
| 7 | Danail Petrov (BUL) | + 1' 54" |
| 8 | Alberto Losada (ESP) | + 1' 54" |
| 9 | Daniele Ratto (ITA) | + 1' 57" |
| 10 | Ángel Vicioso (ESP) | + 1' 58" |
