= Juan José de los Ángeles =

Spanish cyclist

Personal information
- Full name: Juan José de los Ángeles Segui
- Born: 21 February 1973 (age 53) Xeraco, Spain

Cycling career
- Sport: Cycling
- Current team: Retired
- Discipline: Road
- Role: Rider

Amateur team
- 1995–1996: Construcciones ACR–MRA

Professional teams
- 1997–2002: Kelme–Costa Blanca
- 2003–2004: Fassa Bortolo

Juan José de los Ángeles Segui (born 21 February 1973 in Xeraco) is a Spanish former professional road cyclist. He rode in 8 Grand Tours.

== Major results ==
2000
9th Circuito de Getxo
2001
1st GP Llodio
2002
8th Overall Vuelta Ciclista a la Rioja
9th GP Miguel Induráin

=== Grand Tour general classification results timeline ===
Grand Tour	1997	1998	1999	2000	2001	2002	2003
Giro d'Italia	—	—	—	50	DNF	33	—
Tour de France	55	DNF	129	—	—	—	—
Vuelta a España	—	—	—	—	—	52	83

Legend
—	Did not compete
DNF	Did not finish
