= 2017 Abu Dhabi Tour =

Cycling race

2017 UCI World Tour, race 3 of 37

Race details
- Dates: 23–26 February 2017
- Stages: 4
- Distance: 671 km (417 mi)
- Winning time: 15h 42' 21"

Results
| Jersey awarded to the overall winner | Winner | Rui Costa (Portugal) | (UAE Team Emirates) |
| | Second | Ilnur Zakarin (Russia) | (Team Katusha–Alpecin) |
| | Third | Tom Dumoulin (Netherlands) | (Team Sunweb) |
| Jersey awarded to the points classification winner | Points | Mark Cavendish (Great Britain) | (Team Dimension Data) |
| Jersey awarded to the young rider classification winner | Young rider | Julian Alaphilippe (France) | (Quick-Step Floors) |
| Jersey awarded to the sprints classification winner | Sprints | Patrick Konrad (Austria) | (Bora–Hansgrohe) |
| | Team | UAE Team Emirates | |

The 2017 Abu Dhabi Tour was a road cycling stage race that took place between 23 and 26 February. It was the third edition of the Abu Dhabi Tour and was the third event of the 2017 UCI World Tour. It was the first time that the race was included in the UCI World Tour calendar.

The race's mountain-top finish at Jebel Hafeet provided the final podium of the race, after Mark Cavendish (Team Dimension Data), Marcel Kittel (Quick-Step Floors) and Caleb Ewan (Orica–Scott) won the three sprint stages. 2013 world champion Rui Costa, riding for the newly renamed UAE Team Emirates, broke away with Team Katusha–Alpecin's Ilnur Zakarin, with the two staying clear to the end; Costa was able to out-sprint Zakarin, and with the additional bonus seconds for winning the stage, Costa held onto the final victory by four seconds. The podium was completed by Team Sunweb rider Tom Dumoulin, who tried to close the pair down on the mountain, but fell ten seconds shy on the stage.

With finishes of first, second and third on the sprint stages, Cavendish was a comfortable winner of the points classification. In the other classifications, Kittel's teammate Julian Alaphilippe was the winner of the young rider classification; he gained four places overall on the final day with a three-second time bonus for winning one of the intermediate sprints at the Yas Marina Circuit – moving from ninth to fifth in the process. Another final-day mover was Bora–Hansgrohe's Patrick Konrad, who took the intermediate sprints classification, winning the two other sprints and finishing second to Alaphilippe in the third. With eight bonus seconds, he moved from 24th to 10th overall. The teams classification was won by Costa's UAE Team Emirates.

== Teams ==
As a new event to the UCI World Tour, all UCI WorldTeams were invited to the race, but not obligated to compete in the race. As such, sixteen of the eighteen WorldTeams – all excluding Cannondale–Drapac and FDJ – competed in the race. Four UCI Professional Continental teams competed, completing the 20-team peloton.

UCI WorldTeams

- AG2R La Mondiale
- Astana
- Bahrain–Merida
- BMC Racing Team
- Bora–Hansgrohe
- Team Dimension Data
- Team Katusha–Alpecin
- LottoNL–Jumbo
- Lotto–Soudal
- Movistar Team
- Orica–Scott
- Quick-Step Floors
- Team Sky
- Team Sunweb
- Trek–Segafredo
- UAE Team Emirates

UCI Professional Continental teams

- Bardiani–CSF
- Gazprom–RusVelo
- Nippo–Vini Fantini
- Team Novo Nordisk

== Route ==
The full itinerary of the 2017 Abu Dhabi Tour was released on 24 January 2017.

Stage schedule
| Stage | Date | Route | Distance | Type | Winner |
|---|---|---|---|---|---|
| 1 | 23 February | Madinat Zayed to Madinat Zayed | 189 km (117 mi) | Flat stage | Mark Cavendish (GBR) |
| 2 | 24 February | Al Maryah Island to Abu Dhabi | 153 km (95 mi) | Flat stage | Marcel Kittel (GER) |
| 3 | 25 February | Hazza Bin Zayed Stadium, Al Ain to Jebel Hafeet | 186 km (116 mi) | Medium-mountain stage | Rui Costa (POR) |
| 4 | 26 February | Yas Marina Circuit to Yas Marina Circuit | 143 km (89 mi) | Flat stage | Caleb Ewan (AUS) |

== Stages ==
=== Stage 1 ===
23 February 2017 — Madinat Zayed to Madinat Zayed, 189 km (117 mi)

Result of Stage 1
| Rank | Rider | Team | Time |
|---|---|---|---|
| 1 | Mark Cavendish (GBR) | Team Dimension Data | 4h 37' 06" |
| 2 | André Greipel (GER) | Lotto–Soudal | + 0" |
| 3 | Niccolò Bonifazio (ITA) | Bahrain–Merida | + 0" |
| 4 | Simone Consonni (ITA) | UAE Team Emirates | + 0" |
| 5 | Elia Viviani (ITA) | Team Sky | + 0" |
| 6 | Roger Kluge (GER) | Orica–Scott | + 0" |
| 7 | Alexander Porsev (RUS) | Gazprom–RusVelo | + 0" |
| 8 | Matteo Pelucchi (ITA) | Bora–Hansgrohe | + 0" |
| 9 | Nicola Ruffoni (ITA) | Bardiani–CSF | + 0" |
| 10 | Eduard-Michael Grosu (ROU) | Nippo–Vini Fantini | + 0" |

General classification after Stage 1
| Rank | Rider | Team | Time |
|---|---|---|---|
| 1 | Mark Cavendish (GBR) | Team Dimension Data | 4h 36' 56" |
| 2 | André Greipel (GER) | Lotto–Soudal | + 4" |
| 3 | Manuele Mori (ITA) | UAE Team Emirates | + 4" |
| 4 | Niccolò Bonifazio (ITA) | Bahrain–Merida | + 6" |
| 5 | Mirco Maestri (ITA) | Bardiani–CSF | + 8" |
| 6 | Kazushige Kuboki (JPN) | Nippo–Vini Fantini | + 8" |
| 7 | Simone Consonni (ITA) | UAE Team Emirates | + 10" |
| 8 | Elia Viviani (ITA) | Team Sky | + 10" |
| 9 | Roger Kluge (GER) | Orica–Scott | + 10" |
| 10 | Alexander Porsev (RUS) | Gazprom–RusVelo | + 10" |

=== Stage 2 ===
24 February 2017 — Al Maryah Island to Abu Dhabi, 153 km (95 mi)

Result of Stage 2
| Rank | Rider | Team | Time |
|---|---|---|---|
| 1 | Marcel Kittel (GER) | Quick-Step Floors | 3h 28' 11" |
| 2 | Caleb Ewan (AUS) | Orica–Scott | + 0" |
| 3 | Mark Cavendish (GBR) | Team Dimension Data | + 0" |
| 4 | Matteo Pelucchi (ITA) | Bora–Hansgrohe | + 0" |
| 5 | Phil Bauhaus (GER) | Team Sunweb | + 0" |
| 6 | Elia Viviani (ITA) | Team Sky | + 0" |
| 7 | Andrea Guardini (ITA) | UAE Team Emirates | + 0" |
| 8 | Eduard-Michael Grosu (ROU) | Nippo–Vini Fantini | + 0" |
| 9 | André Greipel (GER) | Lotto–Soudal | + 0" |
| 10 | Alexander Porsev (RUS) | Gazprom–RusVelo | + 0" |

General classification after Stage 2
| Rank | Rider | Team | Time |
|---|---|---|---|
| 1 | Mark Cavendish (GBR) | Team Dimension Data | 8h 05' 03" |
| 2 | Marcel Kittel (GER) | Quick-Step Floors | + 4" |
| 3 | André Greipel (GER) | Lotto–Soudal | + 8" |
| 4 | Marco Canola (ITA) | Nippo–Vini Fantini | + 8" |
| 5 | Caleb Ewan (AUS) | Orica–Scott | + 8" |
| 6 | Manuele Mori (ITA) | UAE Team Emirates | + 8" |
| 7 | Niccolò Bonifazio (ITA) | Bahrain–Merida | + 10" |
| 8 | Fabio Calabria (AUS) | Team Novo Nordisk | + 11" |
| 9 | Mirco Maestri (ITA) | Bardiani–CSF | + 12" |
| 10 | Kazushige Kuboki (JPN) | Nippo–Vini Fantini | + 12" |

=== Stage 3 ===
25 February 2017 — Hazza Bin Zayed Stadium, Al Ain to Jebel Hafeet, 186 km (116 mi)

Result of Stage 3
| Rank | Rider | Team | Time |
|---|---|---|---|
| 1 | Rui Costa (POR) | UAE Team Emirates | 4h 34' 08" |
| 2 | Ilnur Zakarin (RUS) | Team Katusha–Alpecin | + 0" |
| 3 | Tom Dumoulin (NED) | Team Sunweb | + 10" |
| 4 | Bauke Mollema (NED) | Trek–Segafredo | + 28" |
| 5 | Julian Alaphilippe (FRA) | Quick-Step Floors | + 46" |
| 6 | Fabio Aru (ITA) | Astana | + 46" |
| 7 | Rafał Majka (POL) | Bora–Hansgrohe | + 46" |
| 8 | George Bennett (NZL) | LottoNL–Jumbo | + 46" |
| 9 | Domenico Pozzovivo (ITA) | AG2R La Mondiale | + 46" |
| 10 | Nairo Quintana (COL) | Movistar Team | + 58" |

General classification after Stage 3
| Rank | Rider | Team | Time |
|---|---|---|---|
| 1 | Rui Costa (POR) | UAE Team Emirates | 12h 39' 15" |
| 2 | Ilnur Zakarin (RUS) | Team Katusha–Alpecin | + 4" |
| 3 | Tom Dumoulin (NED) | Team Sunweb | + 16" |
| 4 | Bauke Mollema (NED) | Trek–Segafredo | + 38" |
| 5 | Rafał Majka (POL) | Bora–Hansgrohe | + 56" |
| 6 | George Bennett (NZL) | LottoNL–Jumbo | + 56" |
| 7 | Fabio Aru (ITA) | Astana | + 56" |
| 8 | Domenico Pozzovivo (ITA) | AG2R La Mondiale | + 56" |
| 9 | Julian Alaphilippe (FRA) | Quick-Step Floors | + 56" |
| 10 | Romain Bardet (FRA) | AG2R La Mondiale | + 1' 08" |

=== Stage 4 ===
26 February 2017 — Yas Marina Circuit to Yas Marina Circuit, 143 km (89 mi)

Result of Stage 4
| Rank | Rider | Team | Time |
|---|---|---|---|
| 1 | Caleb Ewan (AUS) | Orica–Scott | 3h 03' 06" |
| 2 | Mark Cavendish (GBR) | Team Dimension Data | + 0" |
| 3 | André Greipel (GER) | Lotto–Soudal | + 0" |
| 4 | Niccolò Bonifazio (ITA) | Bahrain–Merida | + 0" |
| 5 | Matteo Pelucchi (ITA) | Bora–Hansgrohe | + 0" |
| 6 | Roger Kluge (GER) | Orica–Scott | + 0" |
| 7 | Julian Alaphilippe (FRA) | Quick-Step Floors | + 0" |
| 8 | Alexander Porsev (RUS) | Gazprom–RusVelo | + 0" |
| 9 | Kiel Reijnen (USA) | Trek–Segafredo | + 0" |
| 10 | Rick Zabel (GER) | Team Katusha–Alpecin | + 0" |

Final general classification
| Rank | Rider | Team | Time |
|---|---|---|---|
| 1 | Rui Costa (POR) | UAE Team Emirates | 15h 42' 21" |
| 2 | Ilnur Zakarin (RUS) | Team Katusha–Alpecin | + 4" |
| 3 | Tom Dumoulin (NED) | Team Sunweb | + 16" |
| 4 | Bauke Mollema (NED) | Trek–Segafredo | + 38" |
| 5 | Julian Alaphilippe (FRA) | Quick-Step Floors | + 53" |
| 6 | Rafał Majka (POL) | Bora–Hansgrohe | + 56" |
| 7 | George Bennett (NZL) | LottoNL–Jumbo | + 56" |
| 8 | Fabio Aru (ITA) | Astana | + 56" |
| 9 | Domenico Pozzovivo (ITA) | AG2R La Mondiale | + 56" |
| 10 | Patrick Konrad (AUT) | Bora–Hansgrohe | + 1' 07" |

== Classification leadership table ==
In the 2017 Abu Dhabi Tour, four different jerseys were awarded. For the general classification, calculated by adding each cyclist's finishing times on each stage, and allowing time bonuses for the first three finishers at intermediate sprints and at the finish of mass-start stages, the leader received a red jersey. This classification was considered the most important of the 2017 Abu Dhabi Tour, and the winner of the classification was considered the winner of the race.

Additionally, there was a points classification, which awarded a green jersey. In the points classification, cyclists received points for finishing in the top 10 in a stage. For winning a stage, a rider earned 20 points, with 16 for second, 12 for third, 9 for fourth, 7 for fifth, 5 for sixth with a point fewer per place down to a single point for 10th place. Points towards the classification could also be accrued at intermediate sprint points during each stage; these intermediate sprints also offered bonus seconds towards the general classification. There was also a sprints classification for the points awarded at the aforementioned intermediate sprints, where the leadership of which was marked by a black jersey.

The fourth jersey represented the young rider classification, marked by a white jersey. This was decided in the same way as the general classification, but only riders born after 1 January 1992 were eligible to be ranked in the classification. There was also a classification for teams, in which the times of the best three cyclists per team on each stage were added together; the leading team at the end of the race was the team with the lowest total time.

| Stage | Winner | General classification | Points classification | Young rider classification | Sprints classification | Team classification |
|---|---|---|---|---|---|---|
| 1 | Mark Cavendish | Mark Cavendish | Mark Cavendish | Niccolò Bonifazio | Manuele Mori | Team Dimension Data |
| 2 | Marcel Kittel | Mark Cavendish | Mark Cavendish | Caleb Ewan | Marco Canola | UAE Team Emirates |
| 3 | Rui Costa | Rui Costa | Mark Cavendish | Julian Alaphilippe | Marco Canola | UAE Team Emirates |
| 4 | Caleb Ewan | Rui Costa | Mark Cavendish | Julian Alaphilippe | Patrick Konrad | UAE Team Emirates |
| Final | | Rui Costa | Mark Cavendish | Julian Alaphilippe | Patrick Konrad | UAE Team Emirates |
