= 2001 GP Miguel Induráin =

Race details
- Dates: 7 April 2001
- Stages: 1
- Distance: 189 km (117.4 mi)
- Winning time: 5h 08' 22"

Results
	Winner	Ángel Vicioso (ESP)
	Second	David Etxebarria (ESP)
	Third	Paolo Lanfranchi (ITA)

The 2001 GP Miguel Induráin was the 48th edition of the GP Miguel Induráin cycle race and was held on 7 April 2001. The race started and finished in Estella. The race was won by Ángel Vicioso.

== General classification ==
Final general classification

Rank	Rider	Time
1	Ángel Vicioso (ESP)	5h 08' 22"
2	David Etxebarria (ESP)	+ 0"
3	Paolo Lanfranchi (ITA)	+ 0"
4	Mario Aerts (BEL)	+ 0"
5	Igor Astarloa (ESP)	+ 0"
6	Francisco Mancebo (ESP)	+ 0"
7	Mikel Zarrabeitia (ESP)	+ 0"
8	José Alberto Martínez (ESP)	+ 0"
9	Jörg Jaksche (GER)	+ 5"
10	Mikel Pradera (ESP)	+ 5"
