= 2000 GP Miguel Induráin =

Race details
- Dates: 1 April 2000
- Stages: 1
- Distance: 198.2 km (123.2 mi)
- Winning time: 5h 30' 24"

Results
	Winner	Miguel Ángel Perdiguero (ESP)
	Second	Laurent Jalabert (FRA)
	Third	Ángel Vicioso (ESP)

The 2000 GP Miguel Induráin was the 47th edition of the GP Miguel Induráin cycle race and was held on 1 April 2000. The race started and finished in Estella. The race was won by Miguel Ángel Perdiguero.

== General classification ==
Final general classification

Rank	Rider	Time
1	Miguel Ángel Perdiguero (ESP)	5h 30' 24"
2	Laurent Jalabert (FRA)	+ 0"
3	Ángel Vicioso (ESP)	+ 0"
4	Uroš Murn (SLO)	+ 0"
5	David Etxebarria (ESP)	+ 0"
6	Stefano Garzelli (ITA)	+ 0"
~~7~~	~~Lance Armstrong (USA)~~	~~+ 0"~~
8	Igor Flores (ESP)	+ 0"
9	Alessandro Spezialetti (ITA)	+ 0"
10	Unai Etxebarria (VEN)	+ 0"
