= Bingen Fernández =

Spanish cyclist

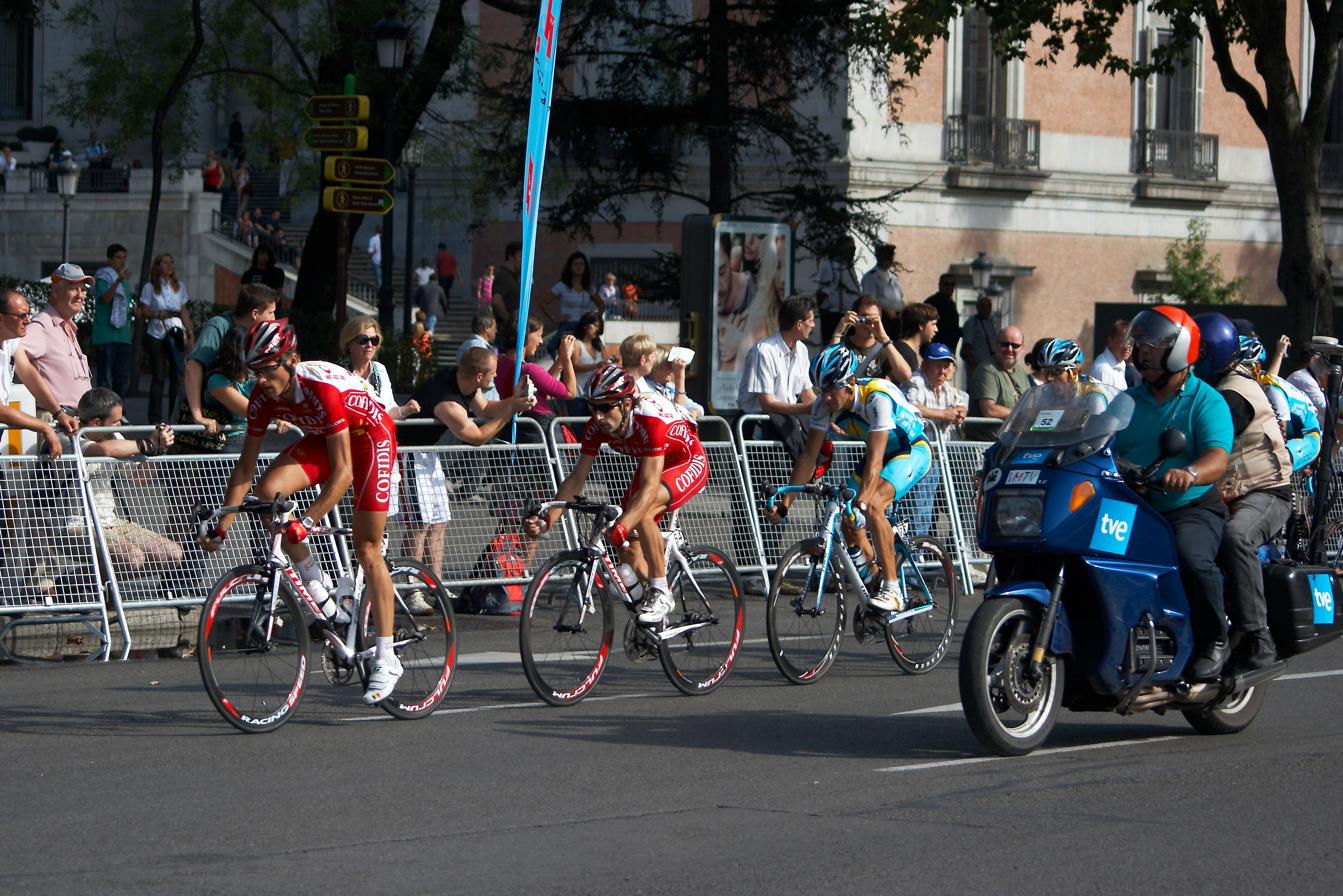
- Kevin de Weert, Bingen Fernández and José Luis Rubiera Vigil

Personal information
- Full name: Bingen Fernández Bustinza
- Born: December 15, 1972 (age 53) Bermeo, Spain
- Height: 1.73 m (5 ft 8 in)
- Weight: 61 kg (134 lb)

Cycling career
- Sport: Cycling
- Current team: Cofidis
- Discipline: Road
- Role: Rider; Sporting director

Professional teams
- 1996–2001: Equipo Euskadi
- 2002–2009: Cofidis

Managerial teams
- 2010–2016: Garmin–Transitions
- 2017–2020: Team Dimension Data
- 2021–: Cofidis

Bingen Fernández Bustinza (born December 15, 1972, in Bermeo, Basque Country) is a Spanish former professional road bicycle racer, who last rode for Cofidis. He became a sporting director in 2010, for Garmin–Transitions, and currently works with Cofidis.

== Biography ==
He turned professional in 1996 with the Euskaltel–Euskadi (1994–2013) team and raced with the Cofidis (cycling team) team from 2002 to 2009. In 2010, he became Sporting director of the EF Education–EasyPost team, now EF Education–EasyPost. Between 2017 and 2020, he held the same position at Team Qhubeka NextHash, then since 2021 at Cofidis (cycling team).

== Major results ==
1997
2nd Trofeo Forla de Navarra
5th Overall Vuelta a Andalucía
10th Tour de l'Avenir
1999
1st Mountains classification Vuelta a La Rioja
8th GP Miguel Induráin
2000
3rd Overall Vuelta a Aragón
4th Overall Tour of the Basque Country
2001
5th GP Primavera
2002
8th GP Miguel Induráin
2003
9th GP Miguel Induráin
2004
10th Overall Volta a la Comunitat Valenciana

=== Grand Tour general classification results timeline ===
| Grand Tour | 1998 | 1999 | 2000 | 2001 | 2002 | 2003 | 2004 | 2005 | 2006 | 2007 | 2008 | 2009 |
|---|---|---|---|---|---|---|---|---|---|---|---|---|
| Giro d'Italia | — | — | — | — | — | — | — | — | — | 29 | DNF | — |
| Tour de France | — | — | — | — | 79 | — | — | — | — | — | — | 105 |
| Vuelta a España | DNF | — | — | 50 | 87 | 85 | 67 | 34 | 85 | 68 | 87 | 58 |
