= GP Miguel Induráin =

Spanish one-day road cycling race

Race details
- Date: Early April
- Region: Navarre, Spain
- English name: Grand Prix Miguel Induráin
- Local name: Gran Premio Miguel Induráin (in Spanish)
- Discipline: Road
- Competition: UCI ProSeries
- Type: Single-day
- Organiser: Club Ciclista Estella ()
- Web site: www.clubciclistaestella.com

History
- First edition: 1951
- Editions: 72 (as of 2026)
- First winner: Hortensio Vidaurreta (ESP)
- Most wins: Hortensio Vidaurreta (ESP); Miguel María Lasa (ESP); Juan Fernández (ESP); Ángel Vicioso (ESP); Alejandro Valverde (ESP); Ion Izagirre (ESP) (3 wins each)
- Most recent: Ion Izagirre (ESP)

The Grand Prix Miguel Induráin (Spanish: Gran Premio Miguel Induráin), formerly the "Grand Prix Navarre" is a Spanish one-day road bicycle race.

== History ==
The race was inaugurated in 1951, but was limited to local competition. It was rebranded after Spanish cyclist Miguel Induráin in 1998. In 2005, the race was upgraded to a 1.1 event on the UCI Europe Tour. For 2007 and 2008 the race was further upgraded to a 1.HC event. The race became part of the new UCI ProSeries in 2020. These higher grades have attracted an increasingly competitive and international field of racers.

The race often loops through the city of Estella-Lizarra, in the Spanish region of Navarre. The modern race always includes several challenging climbs and thus tends to favor a fast all-rounder, rather than a climber or a pure sprinter.

Hortensio Vidaurreta, Miguel María Lasa, Juan Fernández, Ángel Vicioso, and Alejandro Valverde share the record for most wins with three each.

== Past winners ==
Year	Country	Rider	Team
1951	Spain	Hortensio Vidaurreta	individual
1952	Spain	Hortensio Vidaurreta	individual
1953	Spain	Hortensio Vidaurreta	individual
1954	Spain	Miguel Vidaurreta	individual
1955	Spain	Jesús Galdeano	Gamma
1956	Spain	Antonio Ferraz	Minaco
1957	Spain	Miguel Chacón	Faema–Guerra
1958	No race		
1959	Spain	Miguel Pacheco	Faema–Guerra
1960	No race		
1961	Spain	José Pérez Francés	Ferrys
1962	Spain	Juan Belmonte	Ferrys
1963	Spain	José Pérez Francés	Ferrys
1964	Spain	Francisco Gabica	KAS–Kaskol
1965	Spain	Eusebio Vélez	KAS–Kaskol
1966	Spain	Carlos Echeverría	KAS–Kaskol
1967	Spain	Antonio Gómez del Moral	KAS–Kaskol
1968	Spain	José López Rodríguez	Fagor–Fargas
1969	Spain	Gregorio San Miguel	KAS–Kaskol
1970	Spain	Antonio Gómez del Moral	KAS–Kaskol
1971	Spain	Miguel María Lasa	Orbéa–O.A.R.
1972	Spain	Vicente López Carril	KAS–Kaskol
1973	Spain	Domingo Perurena	KAS–Kaskol
1974	Spain	Miguel María Lasa	KAS–Kaskol
1975	Spain	Agustín Tamames	Super Ser
1976	Spain	José Nazábal	KAS–Campagnolo
1977	Spain	Vicente López Carril	KAS–Campagnolo
1978	Spain	Miguel María Lasa	Teka
1979	Spain	Juan Fernández	KAS–Campagnolo
1980	Spain	Juan Fernández	Fosforera–Vereco
1981	Spain	Eulalio García	Teka
1982	Spain	Pedro Muñoz	Zor–Helios
1983	Spain	Juan Fernández	Zor–Gemeaz
1984	No race		
1985	Spain	Celestino Prieto	Reynolds
1986	No race		
1987	Spain	Miguel Induráin	Reynolds-Seur
1988	Spain	Pedro Delgado	Reynolds
1989	Spain	Mariano Sánchez Martinez	Teka
1990	Spain	Pedro Delgado	Banesto
1991	France	Roland Leclerc	Amaya Seguros
1992	Spain	Julián Gorospe	Banesto
1993	Denmark	Johnny Weltz	ONCE
1994	Spain	Marino Alonso	Banesto
1995	Spain	Félix García Casas	Artiach
1996	Switzerland	Alex Zülle	ONCE
1997	Spain	Mikel Zarrabeitia	ONCE
1998	Spain	Francisco Mancebo	Banesto
1999	Italy	Stefano Garzelli	Mercatone Uno–Bianchi
2000	Spain	Miguel Ángel Martín Perdiguero	Vitalicio Seguros–Grupo Generali
2001	Spain	Ángel Vicioso	Kelme–Costa Blanca
2002	Spain	Ángel Vicioso	Kelme–Costa Blanca
2003	Germany	Matthias Kessler	Telekom
2004	Germany	Matthias Kessler	T-Mobile Team
2005	Spain	Javier Pascual Rodríguez	Comunidad Valenciana-Elche
2006	Germany	Fabian Wegmann	Gerolsteiner
2007	Italy	Rinaldo Nocentini	AG2R Prévoyance
2008	Germany	Fabian Wegmann	Gerolsteiner
2009	Spain	David de la Fuente	Fuji–Servetto
2010	Spain	Joaquim Rodríguez	Team Katusha
2011	Spain	Samuel Sánchez	Euskaltel–Euskadi
2012	Spain	Daniel Moreno	Team Katusha
2013	Slovenia	Simon Špilak	Team Katusha
2014	Spain	Alejandro Valverde	Movistar Team
2015	Spain	Ángel Vicioso	Team Katusha
2016	Spain	Ion Izagirre	Movistar Team
2017	Great Britain	Simon Yates	Orica–Scott
2018	Spain	Alejandro Valverde	Movistar Team
2019	France	Jonathan Hivert	Direct Énergie
2020	No race due to COVID-19 pandemic		
2021	Spain	Alejandro Valverde	Movistar Team
2022	France	Warren Barguil	Arkéa–Samsic
2023	Spain	Ion Izagirre	Cofidis
2024	United States	Brandon McNulty	UAE Team Emirates
2025	Belgium	Thibau Nys	Lidl–Trek
2026	Spain	Ion Izagirre	Cofidis

=== Multiple winners ===
Number of wins	Rider	Editions
3 wins	(Spain) Hortensio Vidaurreta	1951, 1952, 1953
3 wins	(Spain) Miguel María Lasa	1971, 1974, 1978
3 wins	(Spain) / (Spain) Juan Fernández	1979, 1980, 1983
3 wins	(Spain) Ángel Vicioso	2001, 2002, 2015
3 wins	(Spain) Alejandro Valverde	2014, 2018, 2021
3 wins	(Spain) Ion Izagirre	2016, 2023, 2026
2 wins	(Spain) Antonio Gómez del Moral	1967, 1970
2 wins	(Spain) José Pérez Francés	1961, 1963
2 wins	(Spain) Vicente López Carril	1972, 1977
2 wins	(Spain) Pedro Delgado	1988, 1990
2 wins	(Germany) Matthias Kessler	2003, 2004
2 wins	(Germany) Fabian Wegmann	2006, 2008

=== Wins per country ===
Wins	Country
56	Spain
4	Germany
3	France
2	Italy
1	Belgium; Denmark; Great Britain; Slovenia; Switzerland; United States
