= 2008 Vuelta a Asturias =

Race details
- Dates: 3–7 May 2008
- Stages: 5
- Distance: 803.7 km (499.4 mi)
- Winning time: 19h 52' 27"

Results
Jersey awarded to the overall winner	Winner	Ángel Vicioso (ESP)	(LA–MSS)
	Second	Xavier Tondo (ESP)	(LA–MSS)
	Third	Bruno Pires (POR)	(LA–MSS)

The 2008 Vuelta a Asturias was the 52nd edition of the Vuelta a Asturias road cycling stage race, which was held from 3 May to 7 May 2008. The race started and finished in Oviedo. The race was won by Ángel Vicioso of the LA–MSS team.

== General classification ==
Final general classification

Rank	Rider	Team	Time
1	Ángel Vicioso (ESP)	LA–MSS	19h 52' 27"
2	Xavier Tondo (ESP)	LA–MSS	+ 1' 06"
3	Bruno Pires (POR)	LA–MSS	+ 1' 42"
4	Koldo Gil (ESP)	Liberty Seguros	+ 1' 55"
5	Tomasz Marczyński (POL)	Ceramica Flaminia–Bossini Docce	+ 2' 16"
6	Gonzalo Rabuñal (ESP)	Karpin–Galicia	+ 2' 23"
7	Nikita Eskov (EST)	Tinkoff Credit Systems	+ 2' 26"
8	Constantino Zaballa (ESP)	LA–MSS	+ 3' 05"
9	José Azevedo (POR)	Benfica	+ 3' 18"
10	Jaume Rovira (ESP)	Extremadura–Gruppo Gallardo	+ 4' 10"
