= Ion Izagirre =

Spanish cyclist

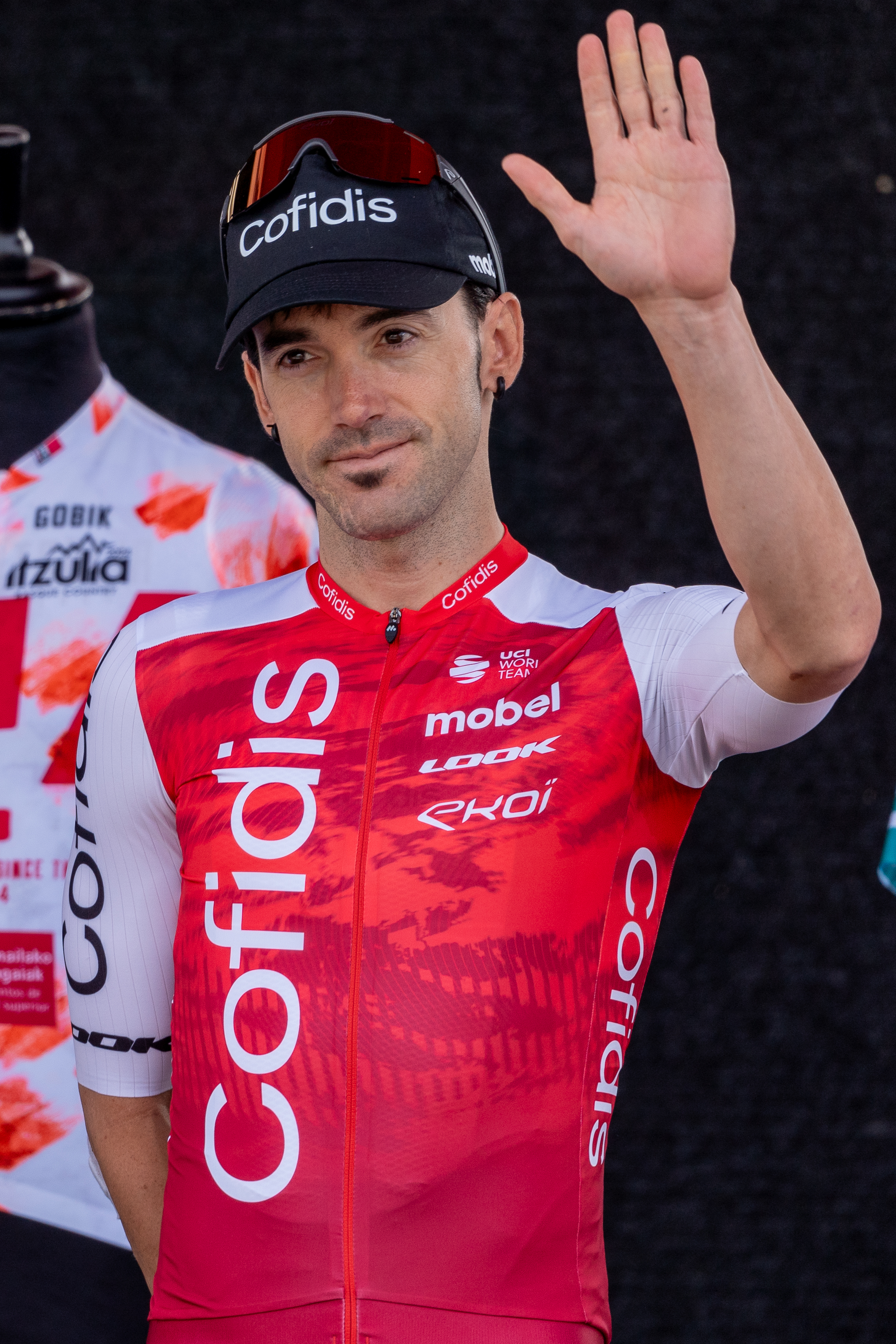
- Izagirre in Espelette, 2024 Itzulia.

Personal information
- Full name: Ion Izagirre Insausti
- Born: 4 February 1989 (age 37) Ormaiztegi, Basque Country, Spain
- Height: 1.73 m (5 ft 8 in)
- Weight: 60 kg (132 lb)

Cycling career
- Sport: Cycling
- Current team: Cofidis
- Disciplines: Road; Cyclo-cross
- Role: Rider
- Rider type: All-rounder

Amateur teams
- 2009: Seguros Bilbao
- 2009: Orbea (stagiaire)

Professional teams
- 2010: Orbea
- 2011–2013: Euskaltel–Euskadi
- 2014–2016: Movistar Team
- 2017–2018: Bahrain–Merida
- 2019–2021: Astana
- 2022–: Cofidis

Major wins
- Grand Tours Tour de France 2 individual stages (2016, 2023) Giro d'Italia 1 individual stage (2012) Vuelta a España 1 individual stage (2020) 1 TTT stage (2019) Stage races Tour of the Basque Country (2019) Tour de Pologne (2015) One-day races and Classics National Road Race Championships (2014) National Time Trial Championships (2016, 2021) GP Miguel Induráin (2016, 2023, 2026)
Medal record
World Championships
Representing Movistar Team
Bronze medal – third place	2015 Richmond	Team time trial

Ion Izagirre Insausti (born 4 February 1989) is a Spanish professional road bicycle racer and cyclo-cross rider from the Basque Country, who currently rides for UCI WorldTeam Cofidis. He is sometimes referred to as Jon Izaguirre, to retain the correct pronunciation under Castilian orthography.

== Career ==
Born in Ormaiztegi in the Basque Country, Izagirre comes from a family of professional cyclists, as both his father José Ramón and brother Gorka have competed professionally on the roads and in cyclo-cross. Having joined the Euskaltel–Euskadi team – alongside brother Gorka – from the 2011 season onwards,

Izagirre won his first professional races in the spring of 2012; he won the individual time trial at the Vuelta a Asturias in April, before taking a victory during his Grand Tour début at the Giro d'Italia. During the sixteenth stage, Izagirre made a solo breakaway with 4 km (2.5 mi) remaining, before winning the stage by sixteen seconds from his nearest competitor.

Following the collapse of the Euskaltel–Euskadi team at the end of the 2013 season, both Izagirre brothers were signed by the Movistar Team for the 2014 season.

In 2015, Izagirre won the Tour de Pologne. He started the final stage sixth on general classification but overhauled race leader Sergio Henao (Team Sky) and the others above him by virtue of a superior time trial performance on the rolling 25-kilometre (16-mile) circuit.

Izagirre won Stage 20 of the 2016 Tour de France in Morzine, after attacking on the wet descent from a three rider group that led over the final climb of Col de Joux Plane.

Izagirre moved to the newly formed Bahrain–Merida team for the 2017 season. He was the team's GC leader at the Tour de France, but crashed out on Stage 1, an individual time trial in Düsseldorf, suffering a lumbar fracture which ended his season.

He was joined at Bahrain–Merida by his brother Gorka for the 2018 season. In August 2018 it was announced that the brothers would join Astana in 2019. In his first year with Astana, Izagirre won the overall titles of the Tour of the Basque Country and the Volta a la Comunitat Valenciana as well as the final stage of Paris–Nice. His win at the Basque Country made him the first Basque rider to win the race since Iban Mayo in 2003. The following season, he won his third Grand Tour stage and first in the Vuelta a España, completing the trio. In June 2021, he won his second national time trial championship, before signing an initial one-year contract to ride for Cofidis in 2022 three months later.

His first win with Cofidis came on stage six of the 2022 Tour of the Basque Country. In 2023, he GP Miguel Induráin one-day race as well as his second Tour de France stage, in a solo victory on stage 12.

Izagirre took his 20th career win at the Memorial Marco Pantani, in his final professional season.

== Major results ==
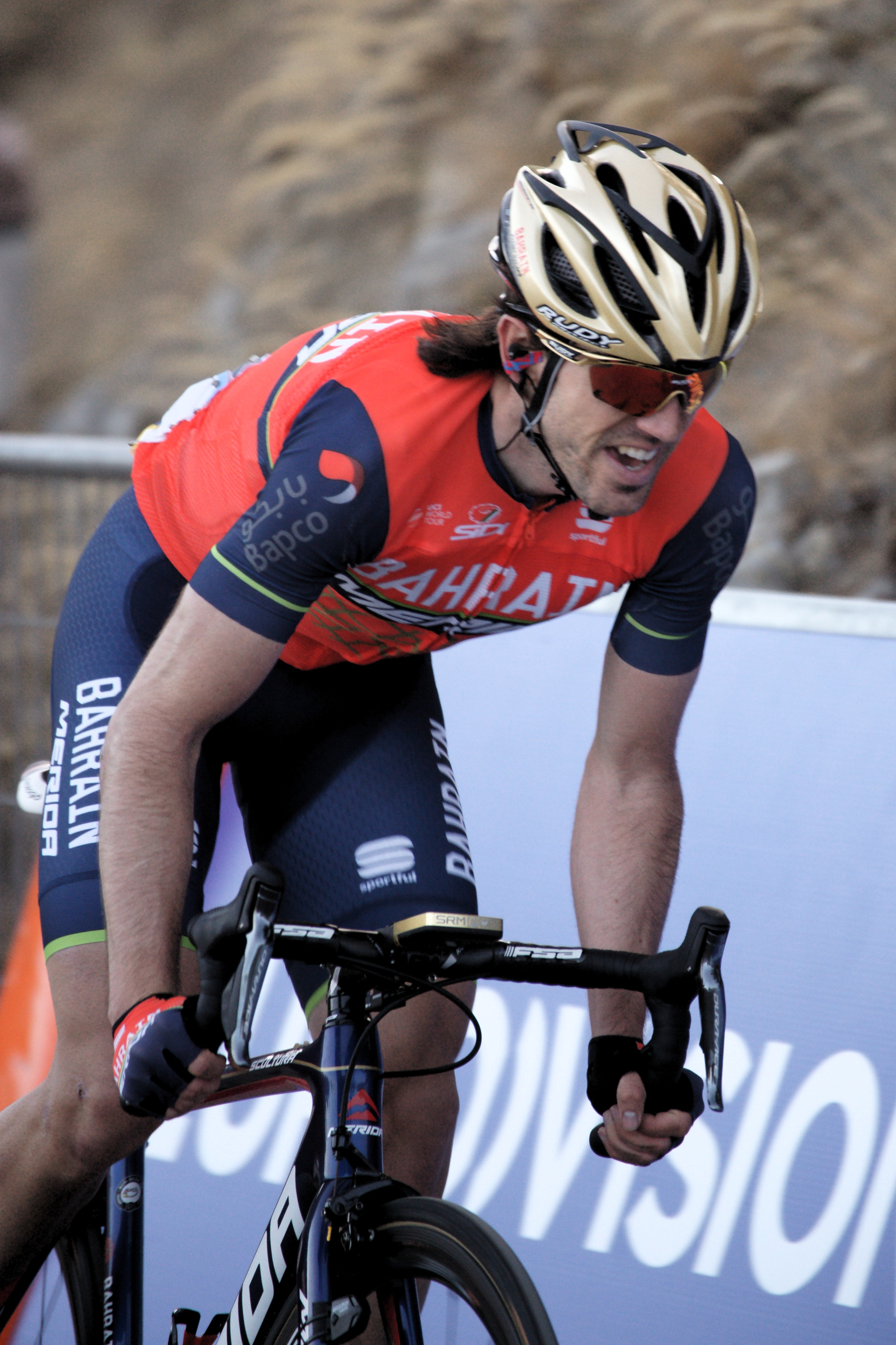
Izagirre at the 2017 Paris–Nice, where he finished in seventh place.

Izagirre crosses the finish line of 2026 Memorial Marco Pantani for his 20th career win.

2006
3rd National Junior Cyclo-cross Championships
2008
1st Gipuzkoa Individual Time Trial
3rd Road race, National Under-23 Road Championships
2009
1st Basque Under-23 Cyclo-cross Championships
1st Memorial Angel Mantecon
1st Stage 4 Bizkaiko Bira
5th Overall Bidasoa Itzulia
2011
4th Prueba Villafranca de Ordizia
2012 (2 pro wins)
1st Stage 16 Giro d'Italia
1st Stage 2b (ITT) Vuelta a Asturias
3rd Les Boucles du Sud Ardèche
7th Overall Tour de Pologne
2013
National Road Championships

2nd Road race
4th Time trial

2nd Overall Tour de Pologne
4th Overall Tour Down Under
9th Grand Prix Cycliste de Montréal
2014 (1)
National Road Championships

1st Road race
2nd Time trial

2nd Overall Tour de Pologne
4th Overall Vuelta a Andalucía
6th Overall Tour of Britain
8th Overall Tour de Romandie
2015 (1)
1st Overall Tour de Pologne
2nd GP Miguel Induráin
2nd Prueba Villafranca de Ordizia
3rd Team time trial, UCI Road World Championships
3rd Overall Tour of the Basque Country
10th Overall Volta ao Algarve
2016 (5)
1st Time trial, National Road Championships
1st GP Miguel Induráin
1st Stage 20 Tour de France
2nd Overall Volta ao Algarve
2nd Overall Tour de Suisse

1st Stage 8 (ITT)

3rd Overall Tour de Romandie

1st Prologue

4th Overall Volta a la Comunitat Valenciana
5th Overall Paris–Nice
8th Time trial, Olympic Games
8th Overall Eneco Tour
8th Grand Prix Cycliste de Montréal
2017
3rd Road race, National Road Championships
3rd Overall Tour of the Basque Country
5th Overall Tour de Romandie
5th Liège–Bastogne–Liège
6th Overall Tour de Suisse
6th Vuelta a Murcia
7th Overall Paris–Nice
7th Amstel Gold Race
2018
3rd Time trial, National Road Championships
3rd Overall Tour of the Basque Country
4th Overall Paris–Nice
6th Giro di Lombardia
7th Clásica de San Sebastián
9th Overall Vuelta a España
2019 (3)
1st Overall Tour of the Basque Country
1st Overall Volta a la Comunitat Valenciana
1st Stage 8 Paris–Nice
1st Stage 1 (TTT) Vuelta a España
2nd Overall Vuelta a Andalucía
2020 (1)
1st Stage 6 Vuelta a España
4th Overall Vuelta a Andalucía
7th Overall Volta a la Comunitat Valenciana
2021 (2)
1st Time trial, National Road Championships
3rd Overall Paris–Nice
7th Overall Critérium du Dauphiné
7th Overall Tour de Romandie
10th Overall Tour of the Basque Country

1st Stage 4

2022 (1)
2nd Overall Tour of the Basque Country

1st Stage 6

5th Time trial, National Road Championships
6th Overall O Gran Camiño
6th Overall Tour Poitou-Charentes en Nouvelle-Aquitaine
7th Overall Paris–Nice
7th GP Miguel Induráin
2023 (2)
1st GP Miguel Induráin
1st Stage 12 Tour de France
3rd Overall Tour of the Basque Country
5th Clásica de San Sebastián
7th Circuito de Getxo
8th Grand Prix Cycliste de Montréal
8th Tre Valli Varesine
10th Coppa Bernocchi
2024
4th Giro di Lombardia
4th GP Miguel Induráin
5th Grand Prix Cycliste de Montréal
9th Overall Tour of the Basque Country
2025
3rd Japan Cup
10th Tre Valli Varesine
2026 (2)
1st GP Miguel Induráin
1st Memorial Marco Pantani
4th Overall Tour of the Basque Country
5th Figueira Champions Classic
6th Eschborn–Frankfurt
7th Overall Paris–Nice
7th Overall Tour Poitou-Charentes en Nouvelle-Aquitaine
7th La Flèche Wallonne
9th Andorra MoraBanc Clàssica

=== General classification results timeline ===
Grand Tour general classification results
Grand Tour	2011	2012	2013	2014	2015	2016	2017	2018	2019	2020	2021	2022	2023	2024	2025	2026
Giro d'Italia	—	48	—	—	27	—	—	—	36	—	—	—	—	—	—	—
Tour de France	—	—	69	41	—	47	DNF	22	—	DNF	26	40	45	DNF	69	45
Vuelta a España	—	—	—	—	—	—	—	9	16	29	26	—	—	37	—	—
Major stage race general classification results
Major stage race	2011	2012	2013	2014	2015	2016	2017	2018	2019	2020	2021	2022	2023	2024	2025	2026
Paris–Nice	—	—	55	19	26	5	7	4	21	—	3	7	21	26	—	7
Tirreno–Adriatico	24	16	—	—	—	—	—	—	—	—	—	—	—	—	28	—
Volta a Catalunya	DNF	—	—	—	—	—	—	—	—	NH	—	—	—	—	—	—
Tour of the Basque Country	—	—	47	55	3	—	3	3	1	NH	10	2	3	9	66	4
Tour de Romandie	103	—	—	8	—	3	5	89	—	NH	7	64	DNF	—	22	—
Critérium du Dauphiné	—	—	—	—	—	—	—	—	—	—	7	—	—	—	—	
Tour de Suisse	—	—	34	43	DNF	2	6	15	—	NH	—	34	12	DNF	52	—

=== Classics results timeline ===
Monument	2011	2012	2013	2014	2015	2016	2017	2018	2019	2020	2021	2022	2023	2024	2025	2026
Milan–San Remo	DNF	85	—	—	24	—	—	—	—	—	—	—	—	—	—	—
Tour of Flanders	133	—	—	—	—	—	—	—	—	—	—	—	—	—	—	—
Paris–Roubaix	DNF	79	—	—	—	—	—	—	—	NH	—	—	—	—	—	—
Liège–Bastogne–Liège	DNF	—	87	86	—	30	5	101	56	—	—	26	16	19	34	
Giro di Lombardia	DNF	—	DNF	DNF	DNF	DNF	—	6	DNF	79	—	—	40	4	13	
Classic	2011	2012	2013	2014	2015	2016	2017	2018	2019	2020	2021	2022	2023	2024	2025	2026
Amstel Gold Race	DNF	—	DNF	DNF	—	24	7	19	—	—	—	—	—	DNF	—	12
La Flèche Wallonne	107	—	67	71	—	64	12	101	DNF	—	—	128	27	DNF	—	7
Eschborn–Frankfurt	—	—	—	—	—	—	—	—	—	—	—	—	—	—	—	6
Clásica de San Sebastián	—	—	—	—	—	19	—	7	—	NH	—	DNF	5	47	99	
Grand Prix Cycliste de Québec	73	DNF	32	—	22	62	—	—	—	NH	NH	DNF	65	44	DNF	
Grand Prix Cycliste de Montréal	32	72	9	—	24	8	—	—	—	NH	NH	63	8	5	13	
Tre Valli Varesine	—	—	—	—	—	—	—	—	—	—	—	39	8	NR	10	

Legend
—	Did not compete
DNF	Did not finish
DSQ	Disqualified
NH	Not held
NR	No result
