= 2002 GP Miguel Induráin =

Race details
- Dates: 6 April 2002
- Stages: 1
- Distance: 177 km (110.0 mi)
- Winning time: 4h 28' 18"

Results
	Winner	Ángel Vicioso (ESP)
	Second	Marcos-Antonio Serrano (ESP)
	Third	Mario Aerts (BEL)

The 2002 GP Miguel Induráin was the 49th edition of the GP Miguel Induráin cycle race and was held on 6 April 2002. The race was won by Ángel Vicioso.

== General classification ==
Final general classification

Rank	Rider	Time
1	Ángel Vicioso (ESP)	4h 28' 18"
2	Marcos-Antonio Serrano (ESP)	+ 0"
3	Mario Aerts (BEL)	+ 0"
4	Fernando Escartín (ESP)	+ 17"
5	Aitor Osa (ESP)	+ 17"
6	Francisco Mancebo (ESP)	+ 17"
7	Jörg Jaksche (GER)	+ 17"
8	Bingen Fernández (ESP)	+ 17"
9	Juan José de los Ángeles (ESP)	+ 17"
10	Gonzalo Bayarri (ESP)	+ 17"
