= 2015 GP Miguel Induráin =

Race details
- Dates: 4 April 2015
- Distance: 192.7 km (119.7 mi)
- Winning time: 4h 56' 42"

Results
	Winner	Ángel Vicioso (ESP)
	Second	Ion Izagirre (ESP)
	Third	Beñat Intxausti (ESP)

The 2015 GP Miguel Induráin was the 62nd edition of the GP Miguel Induráin cycle race and was held on 4 April 2015. The race started and finished in Estella. The race was won by Ángel Vicioso.

== Results ==
Rank	Rider	Team	Time
1	Ángel Vicioso (ESP)	Team Katusha	4h 56' 42"
2	Ion Izagirre (ESP)	Movistar Team	+ 0"
3	Beñat Intxausti (ESP)	Movistar Team	+ 2"
4	Janier Acevedo (COL)	Cannondale–Garmin	+ 14"
5	Alejandro Valverde (ESP)	Movistar Team	+ 39"
6	Daniel Moreno (ESP)	Team Katusha	+ 39"
7	Amets Txurruka (ESP)	Caja Rural–Seguros RGA	+ 39"
8	Francisco Mancebo (ESP)	Skydive Dubai–Al Ahli	+ 41"
9	Tom-Jelte Slagter (NED)	Cannondale–Garmin	+ 41"
10	Pello Bilbao (ESP)	Caja Rural–Seguros RGA	+ 46"
