= 2016 GP Miguel Induráin =

Race details
- Dates: 2 April 2016
- Stages: 1
- Distance: 191.1 km (118.7 mi)
- Winning time: 4h 37' 18"

Results
	Winner	Ion Izagirre (ESP)
	Second	Sergio Henao (COL)
	Third	Moreno Moser (ITA)

The 2016 GP Miguel Induráin was the 63rd edition of the GP Miguel Induráin cycle race and was held on 2 April 2016. The race started and finished in Estella. The race was won by Ion Izagirre.

== General classification ==
Final general classification

Rank	Rider	Time
1	Ion Izagirre (ESP)	4h 37' 18"
2	Sergio Henao (COL)	+ 0"
3	Moreno Moser (ITA)	+ 14"
4	Giovanni Visconti (ITA)	+ 17"
5	Sergey Chernetskiy (RUS)	+ 18"
6	Pello Bilbao (ESP)	+ 20"
7	Egor Silin (RUS)	+ 35"
8	Hugh Carthy (GBR)	+ 2' 42"
9	Fabricio Ferrari (URU)	+ 2' 58"
10	Frederico Figueiredo (POR)	+ 3' 35"
