= 2005 GP Miguel Induráin =

Race details
- Dates: 2 April 2005
- Stages: 1
- Distance: 191.5 km (119.0 mi)
- Winning time: 5h 04' 23"

Results
	Winner	Javier Pascual Rodríguez (ESP)
	Second	Alejandro Valverde (ESP)
	Third	Ángel Vicioso (ESP)

The 2005 GP Miguel Induráin was the 52nd edition of the GP Miguel Induráin cycle race and was held on 2 April 2005. The race was won by Javier Pascual Rodríguez.

== General classification ==
Final general classification

Rank	Rider	Time
1	Javier Pascual Rodríguez (ESP)	5h 04' 23"
2	Alejandro Valverde (ESP)	+ 9"
3	Ángel Vicioso (ESP)	+ 9"
4	Egoi Martínez (ESP)	+ 9"
5	Ricardo Serrano (ESP)	+ 9"
6	David Blanco (ESP)	+ 9"
7	Matthias Kessler (GER)	+ 9"
8	Dionisio Galparsoro (ESP)	+ 9"
9	Pedro Arreitunandia (ESP)	+ 9"
10	Leonardo Bertagnolli (ITA)	+ 9"
