= 1997 Trofeo Foral de Navarra =

Race details
- Dates: 6 April 1997
- Stages: 1
- Distance: 186 km (115.6 mi)
- Winning time: 4h 58' 50"

Results
	Winner	Mikel Zarrabeitia (ESP)
	Second	Bingen Fernández (ESP)
	Third	David Etxebarria (ESP)

The 1997 Trofeo Foral de Navarra was the 44th edition of the GP Miguel Induráin cycle race and was held on 6 April 1997. The race was won by Mikel Zarrabeitia.

== General classification ==
Final general classification

Rank	Rider	Time
1	Mikel Zarrabeitia (ESP)	4h 58' 50"
2	Bingen Fernández (ESP)	+ 0"
3	David Etxebarria (ESP)	+ 0"
4	Abraham Olano (ESP)	+ 20"
5	Aitor Bugallo (ESP)	+ 20"
6	Iñigo González de Heredia (ESP)	+ 20"
7	Aitor Garmendia (ESP)	+ 20"
8	Claus Michael Møller (DEN)	+ 20"
9	Andrei Zintchenko (RUS)	+ 20"
10	Fernando Escartín (ESP)	+ 20"
