= Matthias Kessler =

German cyclist (born 1979)

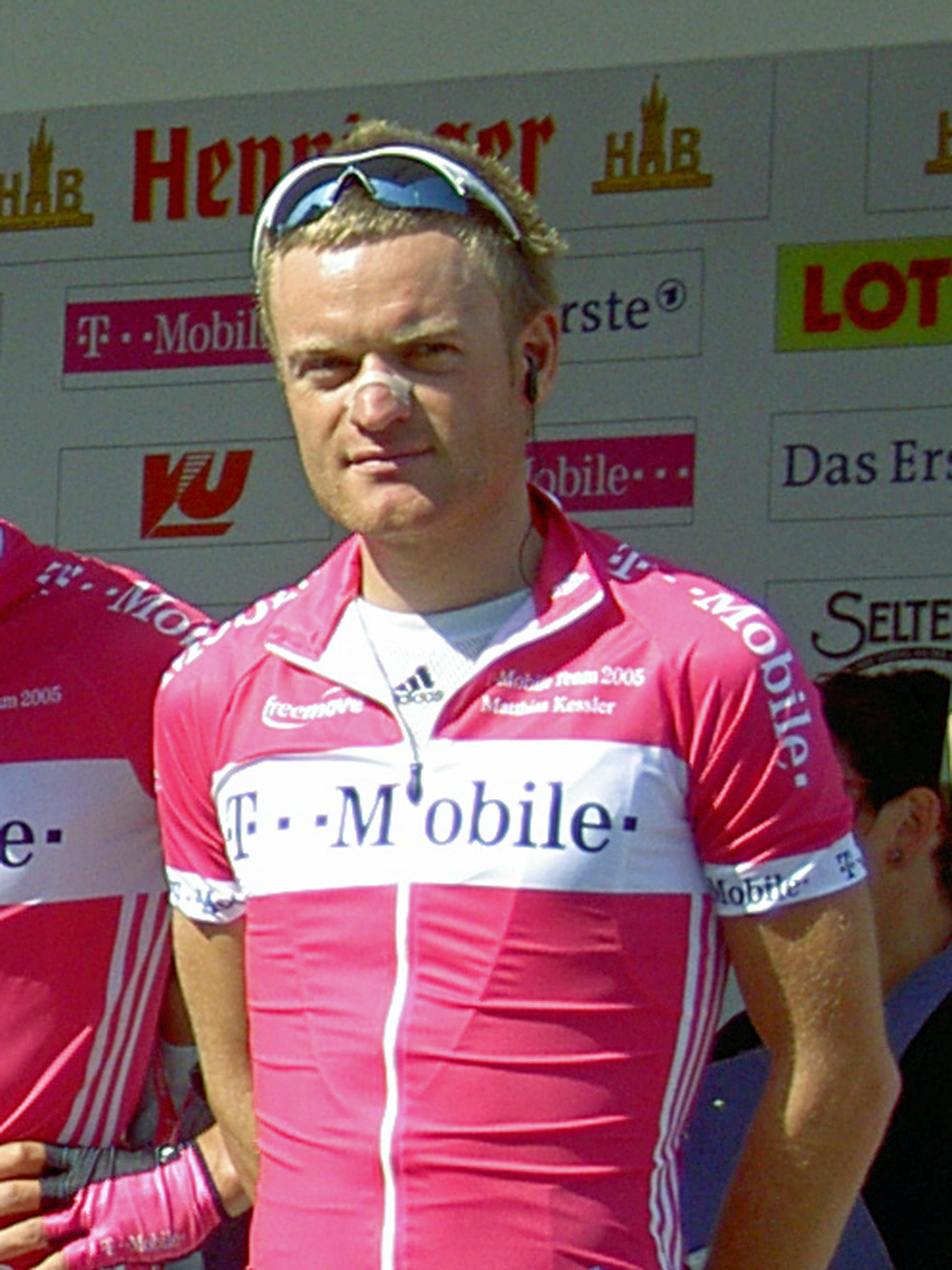
- Kessler at the Rund um den Henninger Turm 2005

Personal information
- Full name: Matthias Kessler
- Born: 16 May 1979 (age 47) Nuremberg, Germany
- Height: 1.72 m (5 ft 8 in)
- Weight: 70 kg (154 lb)

Cycling career
- Sport: Cycling
- Current team: Retired
- Discipline: Road
- Role: Rider
- Rider type: All-rounder

Professional teams
- 2000–2006: Team Telekom
- 2007: Astana

Major wins
- Grand Tours Tour de France 1 individual stage (2006) Single-day races and Classics GP Miguel Induráin (2003, 2004)

Matthias Kessler (born 16 May 1979 in Nuremberg) is a German former professional road racing cyclist who competed from 2000 to 2007 for Team Telekom and Astana.

== Biography ==
Kessler debuted as a pro during the 2000 season after becoming German under 23 champion in 1999, a year in which he also took the bronze medal in the under 23 cycling world championships. Despite the fact that he has only 3 wins in his palmarès, which includes two consecutive victories at the Gran Premio Miguel Induráin and LUK-Cup of 2003, he is seen as an outsider for the Ardennes classic races.

In Grand Tours, Kessler won Stage 3 of the 2006 Tour de France in a late breakaway. The previous day on Stage 2, he was caught by the peloton less than 50 meters from the finish line. He had to abandon the 2004 Tour de France after a serious and spectacular fall caused him severe injuries, even though he managed to end the stage. In the 2005 Tour de France, he was part of the T-Mobile line-up and almost got a win at Mende.

Kessler is known for riding with his jersey open and also for wearing an undershirt intentionally torn for better cooling. In January 2010, he had a collision with a cat while on a training ride in Mallorca, Spain, and was left in a critical condition with severe head injuries.

== Doping ==
On 27 June 2007 Kessler was suspended by Astana for failing a drugs test for testosterone taken in Charleroi in April 2007. He was fired from the team on 13 July. Later named as a recipient of a blood transfusion at the University of Freiburg along with teammates Andreas Klöden and Patrick Sinkewitz during the 2006 Tour de France.

== Major results ==
1997
2nd Overall Grand Prix Rüebliland
5th Road race, UCI Junior Road World Championships
1999
1st Road race, National Under-23 Road Championships
3rd Road race, UCI Under-23 Road World Championships
3rd Gran Premio della Liberazione
2001
2nd Overall Hessen Rundfahrt
2002
2nd Giro del Piemonte
3rd Luk-Cup Bühl
6th Liège–Bastogne–Liège
2003
1st Luk-Cup Bühl
1st GP Miguel Induráin
5th Amstel Gold Race
8th Milano–Torino
2004
1st GP Miguel Induráin
3rd La Flèche Wallonne
6th Liège–Bastogne–Liège
6th Amstel Gold Race
7th Paris–Tours
7th Milano–Torino
2005
7th GP Miguel Induráin
10th Overall Volta a la Comunitat Valenciana
2006
1st Stage 3 Tour de France
2nd Road race, National Road Championships
10th La Flèche Wallonne
2007
4th La Flèche Wallonne
4th Amstel Gold Race
8th Liège–Bastogne–Liège

=== Grand Tour general classification results timeline ===
| Grand Tour | 2000 | 2001 | 2002 | 2003 | 2004 | 2005 | 2006 |
|---|---|---|---|---|---|---|---|
| Giro d'Italia | — | 23 | 25 | — | — | 25 | 72 |
| Tour de France | — | — | — | 49 | DNF | 57 | 53 |
| Vuelta a España | 102 | — | 47 | — | — | — | — |

Legend
| — | Did not compete |
| DNF | Did not finish |

== See also ==
- List of doping cases in cycling
- List of sportspeople sanctioned for doping offences
