= Björn Thurau =

German cyclist

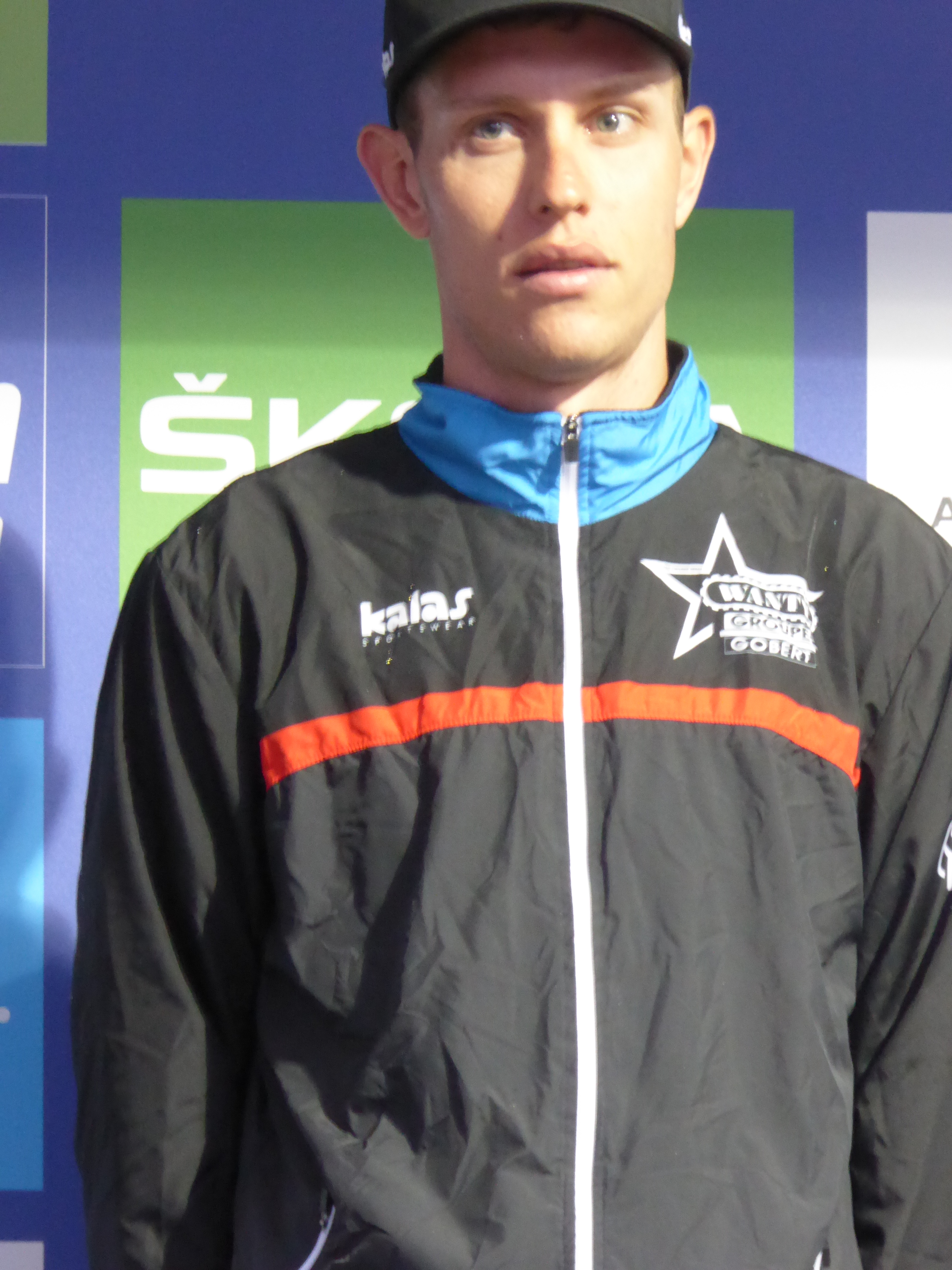
- Thurau at the 2016 Tour of Britain.

Personal information
- Full name: Björn Thurau
- Born: 23 July 1988 (age 38) Frankfurt am Main, West Germany
- Height: 1.94 m (6 ft 4 in)
- Weight: 73 kg (161 lb)

Cycling career
- Sport: Cycling
- Current team: Retired
- Discipline: Road
- Role: Rider

Amateur team
- 2010: Team Bergstrasse

Professional teams
- 2007: Atlas–Romer's Hausbäckerei
- 2008–2009: Elk Haus–Simplon
- 2011: Team NSP
- 2012–2014: Team Europcar
- 2015: Bora–Argon 18
- 2016: Wanty–Groupe Gobert
- 2017: Kuwait–Cartucho.es
- 2018: Holdsworth
- 2019: Vito–Feirense–PNB

Björn Thurau (born 23 July 1988) is a German former professional road racing cyclist, who competed professionally between 2007 and 2019. He is the son of former cyclist Dietrich Thurau.

After retiring, Thurau was a presenter for Global Cycling Network's German-language YouTube channel. He left in February 2021.

In September 2021 he was banned from cycling for doping offences, and his results dating back to December 2010 were stripped.

== Major results ==
2006
1st Overall Grand Prix Rüebliland
2009
4th Rund um die Nürnberger Altstadt
7th Overall Szlakiem Grodów Piastowskich
~~2011~~
~~9th Overall Paris–Corrèze~~
~~10th Overall Azerbaijan International Cycling Tour~~
~~2012~~
~~4th Overall Mi-Août Bretonne~~
~~6th Kampioenschap van Vlaanderen~~
~~2013~~
~~1st Mountains classification Tour de Luxembourg~~
~~10th Coppa Ugo Agostoni~~
~~2014~~
~~1st Mountains classification Tour de Suisse~~
~~2017~~
~~3rd Overall Tour of Qinghai Lake~~
