= 2014 Tour de Suisse =

2014 UCI World Tour, race 17 of 29

Race details
- Dates: 14–22 June 2014
- Stages: 9
- Distance: 1,322 km (821 mi)
- Winning time: 33h 08' 35"

Results
Jersey awarded to the overall winner	Winner	Rui Costa (Portugal)	(Lampre–Merida)
	Second	Mathias Frank (Switzerland)	(IAM Cycling)
	Third	Bauke Mollema (Netherlands)	(Belkin Pro Cycling)
Jersey awarded to the points classification winner	Points	Peter Sagan (Slovakia)	(Cannondale)
Jersey awarded to the mountains classification winner	Mountains	Björn Thurau (Germany)	(Team Europcar)
	Team	Belkin Pro Cycling	

The 2014 Tour de Suisse was the 78th running of the Tour de Suisse cycling stage race. It began on 14 June with an individual time trial in Bellinzona and ended on 22 June in Saas-Fee; in total, the race consisted of nine stages. It was the seventeenth race of the 2014 UCI World Tour season. Rui Costa won the race for the third year in a row. Tony Martin led for almost all of the race, having gained an early advantage in the opening stage time trial. However, Costa was able to gain enough time on the climb at the end of the final stage to overhaul the deficit and in doing so set a record for the most consecutive victories in the race.

== Teams ==
As the Tour de Suisse was a UCI World Tour event, all UCI ProTeams were invited automatically and obligated to send a squad. In addition four Professional Continental teams were given wildcard places

The 22 teams that competed in the race were:

- Ag2r–La Mondiale
- Astana
- Belkin Pro Cycling
- BMC Racing Team
- Cannondale
- CCC–Polsat–Polkowice*
- Team Europcar
- FDJ.fr
- Garmin–Sharp
- Giant–Shimano
- IAM Cycling*
- Team Katusha
- Lampre–Merida
- Lotto–Belisol
- MTN–Qhubeka*
- Movistar Team
- Omega Pharma–Quick-Step
- Orica–GreenEDGE
- Team Sky
- Tinkoff–Saxo
- Trek Factory Racing
- Wanty–Groupe Gobert*

== Race overview ==
Stage	Date	Course	Distance	Type	Winner
1	14 June	Bellinzona to Bellinzona	9.4 km (5.8 mi)	Individual time trial	Tony Martin (GER)
2	15 June	Bellinzona to Sarnen	182 km (113.1 mi)	Mountain stage	Cameron Meyer (AUS)
3	16 June	Sarnen to Heiden	203 km (126.1 mi)	Intermediate stage	Peter Sagan (SVK)
4	17 June	Heiden to Ossingen	160 km (99.4 mi)	Flat stage	Mark Cavendish (GBR)
5	18 June	Ossingen to Büren an der Aare	184 km (114.3 mi)	Flat stage	Sacha Modolo (ITA)
6	19 June	Büren an der Aare to Delémont	184 km (114.3 mi)	Hilly stage	Matteo Trentin (ITA)
7	20 June	Worb to Worb	24.7 km (15.3 mi)	Individual time trial	Tony Martin (GER)
8	21 June	Delémont to Verbier	219 km (136.1 mi)	Mountain stage	Esteban Chaves (COL)
9	22 June	Martigny to Saas-Fee	157 km (97.6 mi)	Mountain stage	Rui Costa (POR)

== Stages ==
=== Stage 1 ===
14 June 2014 — Bellinzona, 9.4 km (5.8 mi), individual time trial (ITT)

Stage 1 Result and General Classification after Stage 1

	Rider	Team	Time
1	Tony Martin (GER)	Omega Pharma–Quick-Step	13' 48"
2	Tom Dumoulin (NED)	Giant–Shimano	+ 6"
3	Rohan Dennis (AUS)	Garmin–Sharp	+ 13"
4	Fabian Cancellara (SUI)	Trek Factory Racing	+ 16"
5	Domenico Pozzovivo (ITA)	Ag2r–La Mondiale	+ 19"
6	Peter Sagan (SVK)	Cannondale	+ 19"
7	Bauke Mollema (NED)	Belkin Pro Cycling	+ 22"
8	Tom-Jelte Slagter (NED)	Garmin–Sharp	+ 23"
9	Jon Izagirre (SPA)	Movistar Team	+ 27"
10	Mattia Cattaneo (ITA)	Lampre–Merida	+ 29"

=== Stage 2 ===
15 June 2014 — Bellinzona to Sarnen, 181.8 km (113.0 mi)

Stage 2 Result

	Rider	Team	Time
1	Cameron Meyer (AUS)	Orica–GreenEDGE	5h 08' 18"
2	Philip Deignan (IRL)	Team Sky	s.t.
3	Larry Warbasse (USA)	BMC Racing Team	s.t.
4	Peter Sagan (SVK)	Cannondale	+ 14"
5	Ben Swift (GBR)	Team Sky	+ 14"
6	Silvan Dillier (SUI)	BMC Racing Team	+ 14"
7	Koen de Kort (NED)	Giant–Shimano	+ 14"
8	Nino Schurter (SUI)	Orica–GreenEDGE	+ 14"
9	Enrico Gasparotto (ITA)	Astana	+ 14"
10	Alexandr Kolobnev (RUS)	Team Katusha	+ 14"

General Classification after Stage 2

	Rider	Team	Time
1	Tony Martin (GER)	Omega Pharma–Quick-Step	5h 22' 20"
2	Tom Dumoulin (NED)	Giant–Shimano	+ 6"
3	Rohan Dennis (AUS)	Garmin–Sharp	+ 13"
4	Peter Sagan (SVK)	Cannondale	+ 19"
5	Bauke Mollema (NED)	Belkin Pro Cycling	+ 22"
6	Tom-Jelte Slagter (NED)	Garmin–Sharp	+ 23"
7	Philip Deignan (IRL)	Team Sky	+ 27"
8	Jon Izagirre (ESP)	Movistar Team	+ 27"
9	Mattia Cattaneo (ITA)	Lampre–Merida	+ 29"
10	Peter Kennaugh (GBR)	Team Sky	+ 29"

=== Stage 3 ===
16 June 2014 — Sarden to Heiden, 206.2 km (128.1 mi)

Stage 3 Result

	Rider	Team	Time
1	Peter Sagan (SVK)	Cannondale	5h 22' 09"
2	Michael Albasini (SUI)	Orica–GreenEDGE	s.t.
3	Sergio Henao (COL)	Team Sky	s.t.
4	Bauke Mollema (NED)	Belkin Pro Cycling	s.t.
5	Cadel Evans (AUS)	BMC Racing Team	s.t.
6	José Joaquín Rojas (ESP)	Movistar Team	s.t.
7	Rui Costa (POR)	Lampre–Merida	s.t.
8	Thibaut Pinot (FRA)	FDJ.fr	s.t.
9	Mathias Frank (SUI)	IAM Cycling	s.t.
10	Roman Kreuziger (CZE)	Tinkoff–Saxo	s.t.

General Classification after Stage 3

	Rider	Team	Time
1	Tony Martin (GER)	Omega Pharma–Quick-Step	10h 44' 34"
2	Tom Dumoulin (NED)	Giant–Shimano	+ 6"
3	Peter Sagan (SVK)	Cannondale	+ 14"
4	Bauke Mollema (NED)	Belkin Pro Cycling	+ 17"
5	Tom-Jelte Slagter (NED)	Garmin–Sharp	+ 23"
6	Davide Formolo (ITA)	Cannondale	+ 27"
7	Jon Izagirre (ESP)	Movistar Team	+ 27"
8	Roman Kreuziger (CZE)	Tinkoff–Saxo	+ 28"
9	Mathias Frank (SUI)	IAM Cycling	+ 29"
10	Mattia Cattaneo (ITA)	Lampre–Merida	+ 29"

=== Stage 4 ===
17 June 2014 — Heiden to Ossingen, 160.4 km (99.7 mi)

Stage 4 Result

	Rider	Team	Time
1	Mark Cavendish (GBR)	Omega Pharma–Quick-Step	3h 35' 03"
2	Juan José Lobato (ESP)	Movistar Team	s.t.
3	Peter Sagan (SVK)	Cannondale	s.t.
4	Sacha Modolo (ITA)	Lampre–Merida	s.t.
5	Alexander Kristoff (NOR)	Team Katusha	s.t.
6	Danny van Poppel (NED)	Trek Factory Racing	s.t.
7	Jonas Vangenechten (BEL)	Lotto–Belisol	s.t.
8	Davide Appollonio (ITA)	Ag2r–La Mondiale	s.t.
9	José Joaquín Rojas (ESP)	Movistar Team	s.t.
10	Matthew Goss (AUS)	Orica–GreenEDGE	s.t.

General Classification after Stage 4

	Rider	Team	Time
1	Tony Martin (GER)	Omega Pharma–Quick-Step	14h 19' 41"
2	Tom Dumoulin (NED)	Giant–Shimano	+ 6"
3	Peter Sagan (SVK)	Cannondale	+ 10"
4	Bauke Mollema (NED)	Belkin Pro Cycling	+ 17"
5	Tom-Jelte Slagter (NED)	Garmin–Sharp	+ 23"
6	Davide Formolo (ITA)	Cannondale	+ 27"
7	Jon Izagirre (ESP)	Movistar Team	+ 27"
8	Roman Kreuziger (CZE)	Tinkoff–Saxo	+ 28"
9	Mathias Frank (SUI)	IAM Cycling	+ 29"
10	Mattia Cattaneo (ITA)	Lampre–Merida	+ 29"

=== Stage 5 ===
18 June 2014 — Ossingen to Büren an der Aare, 183.6 km (114.1 mi)

Stage 5 Result

	Rider	Team	Time
1	Sacha Modolo (ITA)	Lampre–Merida	4h 08' 06"
2	Peter Sagan (SVK)	Cannondale	s.t.
3	John Degenkolb (GER)	Giant–Shimano	s.t.
4	Alexander Kristoff (NOR)	Team Katusha	s.t.
5	José Joaquín Rojas (ESP)	Movistar Team	s.t.
6	Danny van Poppel (NED)	Trek Factory Racing	s.t.
7	Jonas Vangenechten (BEL)	Lotto–Belisol	s.t.
8	Heinrich Haussler (AUS)	IAM Cycling	s.t.
9	Nino Schurter (SUI)	Orica–GreenEDGE	s.t.
10	Jacopo Guarnieri (ITA)	Astana	s.t.

General Classification after Stage 5

	Rider	Team	Time
1	Tony Martin (GER)	Omega Pharma–Quick-Step	18h 27' 47"
2	Tom Dumoulin (NED)	Giant–Shimano	+ 6"
3	Peter Sagan (SVK)	Cannondale	+ 10"
4	Bauke Mollema (NED)	Belkin Pro Cycling	+ 17"
5	Tom-Jelte Slagter (NED)	Garmin–Sharp	+ 23"
6	Davide Formolo (ITA)	Cannondale	+ 27"
7	Jon Izagirre (ESP)	Movistar Team	+ 27"
8	Roman Kreuziger (CZE)	Tinkoff–Saxo	+ 28"
9	Mathias Frank (SUI)	IAM Cycling	+ 29"
10	Mattia Cattaneo (ITA)	Lampre–Merida	+ 29"

=== Stage 6 ===
19 June 2014 — Büren an der Aare to Delémont, 192.8 km (119.8 mi)

Stage 6 Result

	Rider	Team	Time
1	Matteo Trentin (ITA)	Omega Pharma–Quick-Step	4h 43' 19"
2	Daniele Bennati (ITA)	Tinkoff–Saxo	s.t.
3	Francesco Gavazzi (ITA)	Astana	s.t.
4	Ben Swift (GBR)	Team Sky	s.t.
5	Peter Sagan (SVK)	Cannondale	s.t.
6	Sacha Modolo (ITA)	Lampre–Merida	s.t.
7	José Joaquín Rojas (ESP)	Movistar Team	s.t.
8	Silvan Dillier (SUI)	BMC Racing Team	s.t.
9	Sergio Henao (COL)	Team Sky	s.t.
10	Tosh Van der Sande (BEL)	Lotto–Belisol	s.t.

General Classification after Stage 6

	Rider	Team	Time
1	Tony Martin (GER)	Omega Pharma–Quick-Step	23h 11' 06"
2	Tom Dumoulin (NED)	Giant–Shimano	+ 6"
3	Peter Sagan (SVK)	Cannondale	+ 10"
4	Bauke Mollema (NED)	Belkin Pro Cycling	+ 17"
5	Tom-Jelte Slagter (NED)	Garmin–Sharp	+ 23"
6	Davide Formolo (ITA)	Cannondale	+ 27"
7	Jon Izagirre (ESP)	Movistar Team	+ 27"
8	Roman Kreuziger (CZE)	Tinkoff–Saxo	+ 28"
9	Mathias Frank (SUI)	IAM Cycling	+ 29"
10	Mattia Cattaneo (ITA)	Lampre–Merida	+ 29"

=== Stage 7 ===
20 June 2014 — Worb, 24.5 km (15.2 mi), individual time trial (ITT)

Stage 7 Result

	Rider	Team	Time
1	Tony Martin (GER)	Omega Pharma–Quick-Step	31' 37"
2	Tom Dumoulin (NED)	Giant–Shimano	+ 22"
3	Rui Costa (POR)	Lampre–Merida	+ 28"
4	Fabian Cancellara (SUI)	Trek Factory Racing	+ 41"
5	Mathias Frank (SUI)	IAM Cycling	+ 45"
6	Lawson Craddock (USA)	Giant–Shimano	+ 59"
7	Stef Clement (NED)	Belkin Pro Cycling	+ 1' 02"
8	Jon Izagirre (ESP)	Movistar Team	+ 1' 06"
9	Thibaut Pinot (FRA)	FDJ.fr	+ 1' 13"
10	Mattia Cattaneo (ITA)	Lampre–Merida	+ 1' 13"

General Classification after Stage 7

	Rider	Team	Time
1	Tony Martin (GER)	Omega Pharma–Quick-Step	23h 42' 43"
2	Tom Dumoulin (NED)	Giant–Shimano	+ 28"
3	Rui Costa (POR)	Lampre–Merida	+ 1' 05"
4	Mathias Frank (SUI)	IAM Cycling	+ 1' 14"
5	Jon Izagirre (ESP)	Movistar Team	+ 1' 33"
6	Peter Sagan (SVK)	Cannondale	+ 1' 36"
7	Lawson Craddock (USA)	Giant–Shimano	+ 1' 42"
8	Mattia Cattaneo (ITA)	Lampre–Merida	+ 1' 42"
9	Davide Formolo (ITA)	Cannondale	+ 1' 47"
10	Thibaut Pinot (FRA)	FDJ.fr	+ 1' 48"

=== Stage 8 ===
21 June 2014 — Delémont to Verbier, 219.1 km (136.1 mi)

Stage 8 Result

	Rider	Team	Time
1	Esteban Chaves (COL)	Orica–GreenEDGE	5h 11' 16"
2	Roman Kreuziger (CZE)	Tinkoff–Saxo	+ 3"
3	Bauke Mollema (NED)	Belkin Pro Cycling	+ 3"
4	Eros Capecchi (ITA)	Movistar Team	+ 16"
5	Janier Acevedo (COL)	Garmin–Sharp	+ 17"
6	Philip Deignan (IRL)	Team Sky	+ 17"
7	Tony Martin (GER)	Omega Pharma–Quick-Step	+ 17"
8	Davide Formolo (ITA)	Cannondale	+ 17"
9	Rui Costa (POR)	Lampre–Merida	+ 17"
10	Mathias Frank (SUI)	IAM Cycling	+ 17"

General Classification after Stage 8

	Rider	Team	Time
1	Tony Martin (GER)	Omega Pharma–Quick-Step	28h 54' 16"
2	Tom Dumoulin (NED)	Giant–Shimano	+ 51"
3	Rui Costa (POR)	Lampre–Merida	+ 1' 05"
4	Mathias Frank (SUI)	IAM Cycling	+ 1' 14"
5	Bauke Mollema (NED)	Belkin Pro Cycling	+ 1' 41"
6	Davide Formolo (ITA)	Cannondale	+ 1' 47"
7	Roman Kreuziger (CZE)	Tinkoff–Saxo	+ 1' 50"
8	Janier Acevedo (COL)	Garmin–Sharp	+ 2' 07"
9	Eros Capecchi (ITA)	Movistar Team	+ 2' 29"
10	Cadel Evans (AUS)	BMC Racing Team	+ 2' 30"

=== Stage 9 ===
22 June 2014 — Martigny to Saas-Fee, 156.5 km (97.2 mi)

Stage 9 Result

	Rider	Team	Time
1	Rui Costa (POR)	Lampre–Merida	4h 13' 14"
2	Bauke Mollema (NED)	Belkin Pro Cycling	+ 14"
3	Mathias Frank (SUI)	IAM Cycling	+ 24"
4	Steve Morabito (SUI)	BMC Racing Team	+ 47"
5	Oliver Zaugg (SUI)	Tinkoff–Saxo	+ 47"
6	André Cardoso (POR)	Garmin–Sharp	+ 1' 28"
7	Jérémy Roy (FRA)	FDJ.fr	+ 1' 41"
8	Marcel Wyss (SUI)	IAM Cycling	+ 1' 48"
9	Tom Dumoulin (NED)	Giant–Shimano	+ 2' 18"
10	Roman Kreuziger (CZE)	Tinkoff–Saxo	+ 2' 18"

Final General Classification

	Rider	Team	Time
1	Rui Costa (POR)	Lampre–Merida	33h 08' 35"
2	Mathias Frank (SUI)	IAM Cycling	+ 33"
3	Bauke Mollema (NED)	Belkin Pro Cycling	+ 50"
4	Tony Martin (GER)	Omega Pharma–Quick-Step	+ 1' 13"
5	Tom Dumoulin (NED)	Giant–Shimano	+ 2' 04"
6	Steve Morabito (SUI)	BMC Racing Team	+ 2' 47"
7	Davide Formolo (ITA)	Cannondale	+ 3' 00"
8	Roman Kreuziger (CZE)	Tinkoff–Saxo	+ 3' 03"
9	Janier Acevedo (COL)	Garmin–Sharp	+ 3' 20"
10	Eros Capecchi (ITA)	Movistar Team	+ 3' 46"

== Classification leadership table ==
In the 2014 Tour de Suisse, three different jerseys were awarded. For the general classification, calculated by adding each cyclist's finishing times on each stage, and the leader received a yellow jersey. This classification was considered the most important of the Tour de Suisse, and the winner of the classification was considered the winner of the race. There was also a mountains classification, the leadership of which was marked by a red jersey. In the mountains classification, points were won by reaching the top of a climb before other cyclists, with more points available for the higher-categorised climbs; there were twenty-one categorised climbs in the race, split into five distinctive categories.

The third jersey represented the points classification, marked by a white-and-red jersey. In the points classification, cyclists got points for finishing highly in a stage. For stages 4, 5, 6 and 8, the win earned 25 points, second place earned 20 points, third 16, fourth 13, fifth 11, and one point fewer per place down to a single point for 15th. For all other stages, the win earned 15 points, second place earned 12 points, third 10, and one point fewer per place down to a single point for 12th. Points could also be earned at intermediate sprints for finishing in the top 3 at intermediate sprint points during each stage on a 6–3–1 scale. There was also a classification for teams, in which the times of the best three cyclists per team on each stage were added together; the leading team at the end of the race was the team with the lowest total time.

Stage	Winner	General Classification	Mountains Classification	Points Classification	Team Classification
1	Tony Martin	Tony Martin	not awarded	Tony Martin	Garmin–Sharp
2	Cameron Meyer	Tony Martin	Björn Thurau	Peter Sagan	Garmin–Sharp
3	Peter Sagan	Tony Martin	Björn Thurau	Peter Sagan	Giant–Shimano
4	Mark Cavendish	Tony Martin	Björn Thurau	Peter Sagan	Giant–Shimano
5	Sacha Modolo	Tony Martin	Björn Thurau	Peter Sagan	Giant–Shimano
6	Matteo Trentin	Tony Martin	Björn Thurau	Peter Sagan	Giant–Shimano
7	Tony Martin	Tony Martin	Björn Thurau	Peter Sagan	Giant–Shimano
8	Esteban Chaves	Tony Martin	Björn Thurau	Peter Sagan	Lampre–Merida
9	Rui Costa ⋅	Rui Costa	Björn Thurau	Peter Sagan	Belkin Pro Cycling
Final		Rui Costa	Björn Thurau	Peter Sagan	Belkin Pro Cycling
