= Ángel Vicioso =

Spanish cyclist

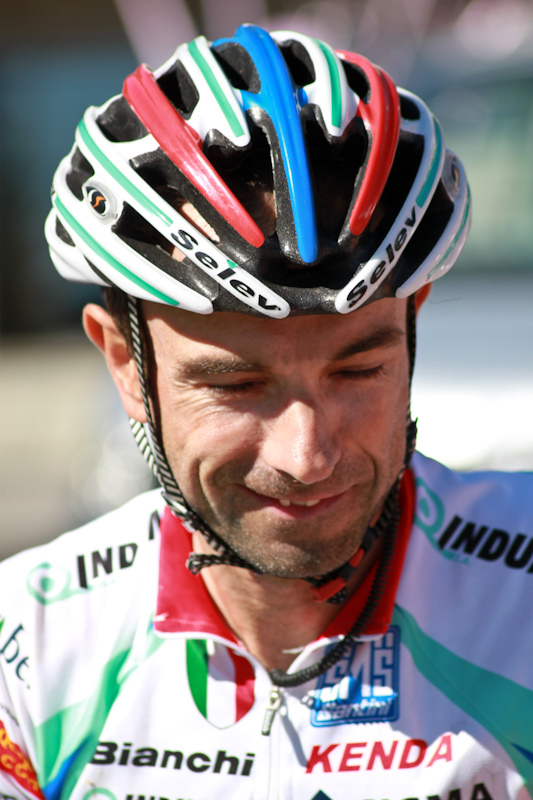
- Vicioso at the 2011 Giro d'Italia

Personal information
- Full name: Ángel Vicioso Arcos
- Born: 13 April 1977 (age 49) Alhama de Aragón, Spain
- Height: 1.70 m (5 ft 7 in)
- Weight: 60 kg (132 lb)

Cycling career
- Sport: Cycling
- Current team: Retired
- Discipline: Road
- Role: Classics specialist

Professional teams
- 1999–2002: Kelme–Costa Blanca
- 2003–2006: ONCE–Eroski
- 2007: Relax–GAM
- 2008: LA–MSS
- 2009–2010: Andalucía–Cajasur
- 2011: Androni Giocattoli
- 2012–2017: Team Katusha

Major wins
- Grand Tours Giro d'Italia 1 individual stage (2011)

Ángel Vicioso Arcos (born 13 April 1977) is a Spanish former road racing cyclist, who competed professionally between 1999 and 2017 for the Kelme–Costa Blanca, Astana, Relax–GAM, LA–MSS, Andalucía–Cajasur, Androni Giocattoli and Team Katusha–Alpecin squads.

== Major results ==
1999
6th Overall Vuelta a Asturias
2000
2nd Overall Vuelta a La Rioja

1st Stage 2

3rd GP Miguel Induráin
2001
1st GP Miguel Induráin
1st Clásica de Sabiñánigo
1st Stage 4 Volta ao Alentejo
6th Clásica a los Puertos de Guadarrama
9th Subida al Naranco
2002
1st GP Miguel Induráin
1st Klasika Primavera
5th Trofeo Luis Puig
2003
Volta a Catalunya

1st Points classification
1st Stages 1 (TTT) & 7

1st Stage 1 (TTT) Vuelta a España
2nd GP Miguel Induráin
7th Milano–Torino
9th Overall Tour of the Basque Country

1st Stage 2

9th Trofeo Luis Puig
9th Amstel Gold Race
2004
4th GP Miguel Induráin
4th Gran Premio de Llodio
7th Overall Vuelta a Castilla y León
9th Overall Tirreno–Adriatico
9th Overall Euskal Bizikleta

1st Stages 3 & 4b (ITT)

10th Liège–Bastogne–Liège
2005
Euskal Bizikleta

1st Stages 1 & 4a

3rd GP Miguel Induráin
6th La Flèche Wallonne
7th Overall Tirreno–Adriatico
10th Liège–Bastogne–Liège
2006
4th Overall Tour de Suisse

1st Stage 4

6th Overall Vuelta a Murcia
2007
1st Stage 1 Vuelta a Asturias
2nd Overall Tour of the Basque Country

1st Stage 3

2nd Overall Vuelta a la Comunidad de Madrid

1st Points classification
1st Stages 1 & 3

2nd Overall Vuelta a Murcia
10th Klasika Primavera
2008
1st Overall Vuelta a Asturias

1st Stage 1

3rd Overall GP Internacional Paredes Rota dos Móveis
4th Overall Vuelta a la Comunidad de Madrid

1st Stage 2

6th Overall Volta ao Alentejo
2009
1st Stage 6 Vuelta a Asturias
2nd Vuelta a La Rioja
8th Subida al Naranco
9th Overall GP Internacional Paredes Rota dos Móveis
10th Klasika Primavera
2010
1st Vuelta a La Rioja
1st Gran Premio de Llodio
9th Overall Vuelta a Asturias

1st Points classification
1st Stage 2

2011
1st GP Industria & Artigianato di Larciano
1st Stage 3 Giro d'Italia
3rd Trofeo Laigueglia
6th Montepaschi Strade Bianche
9th Overall Settimana Internazionale di Coppi e Bartali

1st Stage 1b (TTT)

10th Giro dell'Appennino
2012
7th Gran Premio Industria e Commercio di Prato
10th Overall Paris–Nice
2013
10th GP Miguel Induráin
2015
1st GP Miguel Induráin
1st Prologue (TTT) Tour of Austria
2016
2nd Road race, National Road Championships

=== Grand Tour general classification results timeline ===
Grand Tour	2000	2001	2002	2003	2004	2005	2006	2007	2008	2009	2010	2011	2012	2013	2014	2015	2016	2017
Giro d'Italia	72	—	50	—	—	—	—	—	—	—	—	71	69	DNF	DNF	—	—	DNF
Tour de France	—	—	—	DNF	DNF	64	—	—	—	—	—	—	—	—	—	—	129	—
Vuelta a España	—	52	—	67	—	47	—	—	—	—	—	—	95	80	—	103	—	—

Legend
—	Did not compete
DNF	Did not finish
