= List of wins by TIAA CREF and its successors =

This article comprises a list of victories accounts races won by the EF Education–EasyPost team. The races are categorized according to the UCI Continental Circuits rules. The team was in the UCI Continental category from 2005 to 2006 then up to UCI Professional Continental from 2007 till 2008. In 2009 the Team stepped up to the UCI World Tour.

== 2005 TIAA-CREF ==
Stage 1 (ITT) Tour of Puerto Rico, Timothy Duggan

== 2006 TIAA-CREF ==
Stage 1 Tour of Normandy, Bradly Huff
Stage 4 Tour of the Gila, Rahsaan Bahati
Stage 2 FBD Insurance Rás, Danny Pate
Stage 4a (ITT) Tour de Beauce, Danny Pate
Stage 6 Tour of Utah, Blake Caldwell

== 2007 Slipstream-Chipotle ==
Stage 1 (ITT) Tour of the Bahamas, William Frischkorn
Stage 3 Tour of the Gila, Tom Peterson
Stage 5 Tour de Beauce, Ian MacGregor
Stage 6 Tour de Toona, Taylor Tolleson
Stage 2 Giro della Valle d'Aosta, Dan Martin
Univest Grand Prix, William Frischkorn
Stage 5 Tour of Missouri, Danny Pate
Stage 6 Vuelta Chihuahua Internacional, William Frischkorn

== 2008 Garmin-Chipotle ==
Overall Tour of the Bahamas, Tyler Farrar

Stages 2 & 3 Tyler Farrar

Stage 3 (ITT) Circuit de la Sarthe, Christian Vande Velde
Stage 4 (ITT) Tour de Georgia, Trent Lowe
Stage 1 (TTT) Giro d'Italia
Overall Delta Tour Zeeland, Christopher Sutton
Overall Route du Sud, Dan Martin
Stages 1 & 6 Tour of Pennsylvania, Daniel Holloway
Univest Grand Prix, Lucas Euser
Overall Tour of Missouri, Christian Vande Velde

Stage 3 (ITT) Christian Vande Velde

Stage 1 Tour du Poitou-Charentes, Tyler Farrar

== 2009 Garmin-Slipstream ==
Overall Jayco Herald Sun Tour Bradley Wiggins

Stages 2–4 Christopher Sutton
Stage 5 (ITT) Bradley Wiggins

Overall Circuit Franco-Belge Tyler Farrar

Stages 1 & 2 Tyler Farrar

Overall Delta Tour Zeeland Tyler Farrar

Stage 1 (ITT) Tyler Farrar

Overall Tour of Missouri David Zabriskie
Vattenfall Cyclassics, Tyler Farrar
Stages 1–2 & 4 Eneco Tour of Benelux, Tyler Farrar
Vuelta a España

Stage 11 Tyler Farrar
Stage 12 Ryder Hesjedal
Stage 20 (ITT) David Millar

Stage 4 Paris–Nice, Christian Vande Velde
Stage 3 Tirreno–Adriatico, Tyler Farrar
Stage 2 Tour of California, Tom Peterson
Stage 3 (ITT) Three Days of de Panne, Bradley Wiggins
Stage 1 (TTT) Tour of Qatar
Stage 4 (ITT) Vuelta a Burgos, Tom Danielson
Stage 1 Tour of Britain, Christopher Sutton

== 2010 Garmin-Transitions ==
Overall Tour of Poland, Dan Martin

Stage 5 Dan Martin

Overall Three Days of De Panne, David Millar

Stage 3 David Millar

Overall Delta Tour Zeeland, Tyler Farrar
Overall Tour of the Bahamas, Caleb Fairly

Stage 3 Caleb Fairly

Vattenfall Cyclassics, Tyler Farrar
Scheldeprijs, Tyler Farrar
Tre Valli Varesine, Dan Martin
Stage 5 & 21 Vuelta a España, Tyler Farrar
Stages 2 & 10 Giro d'Italia, Tyler Farrar
Eneco Tour

Stage 1a Svein Tuft
Stage 5 Jack Bobridge

Stage 3 (ITT) Critérium International, David Millar
Tour of California

Stage 3 David Zabriskie
Stage 8 Ryder Hesjedal

Stages 1 & 2 Vuelta a Murcia, Robert Hunter
Stage 5 (ITT) Danmark Rundt, Svein Tuft

== 2011 Garmin–Cervélo ==
Overall Tour Down Under, Cameron Meyer

Stage 4 Cameron Meyer

Paris–Roubaix, Johan Vansummeren
Tour de France

Stage 2 (TTT)
Stage 3 Tyler Farrar
Stages 13 & 16 Thor Hushovd

Stage 21 (ITT) Giro d'Italia, David Millar
Stage 4 Tour de Suisse, Thor Hushovd
Stage 9 Vuelta a España, Dan Martin
Stage 6 Tour of Poland, Dan Martin
Stages 2 & 3 Tour of Qatar, Heinrich Haussler
Stage 6 (ITT) Tour of California, David Zabriskie
Stage 4 Tour of Britain, Thor Hushovd

== 2012 Garmin-Barracuda/Garmin-Sharp ==
Overall Giro d'Italia, Ryder Hesjedal

Stage 3 (TTT)

Overall USA Pro Cycling Challenge, Christian Vande Velde

Stages 1 & 5 Tyler Farrar
Stage 3 Tom Danielson

Overall Tour de l'Ain, Andrew Talansky

Stage 4 Andrew Talansky

Omloop Het Nieuwsblad, Sep Vanmarcke
Stage 12 Tour de France, David Millar
Stages 2 & 3 Tour Méditerranéen, Michel Kreder
Stage 2 (TTT) Tour of Qatar
Stage 1 (ITT) Tour de Langkawi, David Zabriskie
Stage 5 (ITT) Tour of California, David Zabriskie
Circuit de la Sarthe

Stage 2 Michel Kreder
Stage 4 Thomas Dekker

Stage 2 Glava Tour of Norway, Raymond Kreder
Stage 2 (TTT) Tour of Utah
Stages 1 & 4 Tour de Vineyards, Jack Bauer

== 2013 Garmin-Sharp ==
Overall Volta a Catalunya, Dan Martin

Stage 4 Dan Martin

Overall Tour of Utah, Tom Danielson

Stage 3 Lachlan Morton

Overall Tour of Alberta, Rohan Dennis

Stage 3 Rohan Dennis

Liège–Bastogne–Liège, Dan Martin
Japan Cup, Jack Bauer
Stage 9 Tour de France, Dan Martin
Stage 11 Giro d'Italia, Ramūnas Navardauskas
Stage 3 Paris–Nice, Andrew Talansky
Stage 2 Tour de Romandie, Ramūnas Navardauskas
Stage 4 Tour of California, Tyler Farrar
Stage 4 Four Days of Dunkirk, Michel Kreder
Stage 3 Tour de l'Eurometropole, Tyler Farrar
Stage 1 Bayern-Rundfahrt, Alex Rasmussen

== 2014 Garmin-Sharp ==
Overall Critérium du Dauphiné, Andrew Talansky
Overall Circuit de la Sarthe, Ramūnas Navardauskas

Stage 4 Ramūnas Navardauskas

Overall Tour of Utah, Tom Danielson

Stage 4 Tom Danielson

Overall Tour of Britain, Dylan van Baarle
Egmond-pier-Egmond, Sebastian Langeveld
ProRace Berlin, Raymond Kreder
Giro di Lombardia, Dan Martin
Japan Cup, Nathan Haas
Stages 4 & 7 Paris–Nice, Tom-Jelte Slagter
Stage 19 Tour de France, Ramūnas Navardauskas
Stage 14 Vuelta a España, Ryder Hesjedal
Stage 3 Tour of Beijing, Tyler Farrar
Stage 4 Tour of Beijing, Dan Martin
Stage 3 Tour of California, Rohan Dennis
Stage 7 USA Pro Cycling Challenge, Alex Howes
Herald Sun Tour

Prologue Jack Bauer
Stage 1 Nathan Haas

Stage 1 Tour de l'Ain, Raymond Kreder
Stage 1 Tour de San Luis, Phil Gaimon
Stage 5 Tour de Vineyards, Jack Bauer

== 2015 Cannondale-Garmin ==
Overall Circuit de la Sarthe, Ramūnas Navardauskas
Overall Tour of Utah, Joe Dombrowski

Stage 6, Joe Dombrowski

Stage 1 Critérium International, Ben King
Stage 4 Giro d'Italia, Davide Formolo
Stage 8 Tour of Austria, Moreno Moser
Stages 2 & 4 Tour of Alberta, Tom-Jelte Slagter
Stage 5 Tour of Alberta, Lasse Norman Hansen

== 2016 Cannondale/Cannondale–Drapac ==
Stage 1 Tour du Haut Var, Tom-Jelte Slagter
GP Industria & Artigianato di Larciano, Simon Clarke
Stage 2 Tour of California, Ben King
Stage 5 Tour of California, Toms Skujiņš
Stage 6 Tour of Utah, Andrew Talansky
Stage 1 (TTT) Czech Cycling Tour
Stage 5 Tour of Britain, Jack Bauer
Japan Cup, Davide Villella

== 2017 Cannondale–Drapac ==
Stage 2 Settimana Internazionale di Coppi e Bartali, Toms Skujiņš
Stage 5 Tour of California, Andrew Talansky
Stage 17 Giro d'Italia, Pierre Rolland
Stage 3 Route du Sud, Pierre Rolland
Stage 4 Route du Sud, Tom Scully
Stage 2 Tour of Austria, Tom-Jelte Slagter
Stage 9 Tour de France, Rigoberto Urán
Stage 2 Colorado Classic, Alex Howes
Milano–Torino, Rigoberto Urán

== 2018 EF Education First–Drapac p/b Cannondale ==
Stage 5 Colombia Oro y Paz, Rigoberto Urán
Stage 3 Vuelta a Andalucía, Sacha Modolo
Stage 4 Circuit de la Sarthe, Daniel McLay
Stage 3 Tour of Slovenia, Rigoberto Urán
Stage 5 Vuelta a España, Simon Clarke
Stage 17 Vuelta a España, Michael Woods

== 2019 EF Education First Pro Cycling ==
Stage 1 Herald Sun Tour, Daniel McLay
Stage 2 Herald Sun Tour, Michael Woods
Stage 1 (TTT) Tour Colombia
Stage 1 Tour du Haut Var, Sep Vanmarcke
Stage 7 Paris–Nice, Daniel Martínez
Tour of Flanders, Alberto Bettiol
Stage 9 Tour de Suisse, Hugh Carthy
Stage 5 Tour of Utah, Lachlan Morton
Stage 6 Tour of Utah, Joe Dombrowski
Bretagne Classic Ouest–France, Sep Vanmarcke
Stage 18 Vuelta a España, Sergio Higuita
Milano–Torino, Michael Woods
Stage 2 Tour of Guangxi, Daniel McLay

== 2020 EF Pro Cycling ==
Colombia National Time Trial Championships, Sergio Higuita
Colombia National Road Race Championships, Sergio Higuita
Stage 2 Étoile de Bessèges, Magnus Cort
Stage 5 (ITT) Étoile de Bessèges, Alberto Bettiol
Overall Tour Colombia, Sergio Higuita

Stage 1 (TTT) (Note: The winning riders were Jonathan Caicedo, Lawson Craddock, Sergio Higuita, Daniel Martínez, Rigoberto Urán, and Tejay van Garderen)
Stage 4, Sergio Higuita
Stage 6, Daniel Martínez

La Drôme Classic, Simon Clarke
Overall Critérium du Dauphiné, Daniel Martínez
Stage 3 Tirreno–Adriatico, Michael Woods
Stage 13 Tour de France, Daniel Martínez
Stage 3 Giro d'Italia, Jonathan Caicedo
Stage 9 Giro d'Italia, Ruben Guerreiro
Stage 7 Vuelta a España, Michael Woods
Stage 12 Vuelta a España, Hugh Carthy
Stage 16 Vuelta a España, Magnus Cort

== 2021 EF Education–Nippo ==
Stage 3 (ITT) Paris–Nice, Stefan Bissegger
Stage 8 Paris–Nice, Magnus Cort
Stage 18 Giro d'Italia, Alberto Bettiol
Stage 4 Tour de Suisse, Stefan Bissegger
Stage 7 (ITT) Tour de Suisse, Rigoberto Urán
Stage 4 Route d'Occitanie, Magnus Cort
United States National Time Trial Championships, Lawson Craddock
Clásica de San Sebastián, Neilson Powless
Stage 5 Vuelta a Burgos, Hugh Carthy
Stage 7 Tour de Pologne, Julius van den Berg
Stages 6, 12 & 19 Vuelta a España, Magnus Cort
Stage 2 (ITT) Benelux Tour, Stefan Bissegger
Giro della Toscana, Michael Valgren
Coppa Sabatini, Michael Valgren

== 2022 EF Education–EasyPost ==
Stage 3 (ITT) UAE Tour, Stefan Bissegger
Stage 1 O Gran Camiño, Magnus Cort
Stage 4 (ITT) O Gran Camiño, Mark Padun
Mont Ventoux Dénivelé Challenge, Ruben Guerreiro
Ireland National Time Trial Championships, Ben Healy
Eritrea National Road Race Championships, Merhawi Kudus
Stage 10 Tour de France, Magnus Cort
UEC European Time Trial Championships, Stefan Bissegger
Stage 17 Vuelta a España, Rigoberto Urán
Japan Cup, Neilson Powless

== 2023 EF Education–EasyPost ==
Prologue Tour Down Under, Alberto Bettiol
Trofeo Ses Salines–Alcúdia, Marijn van den Berg
Grand Prix La Marseillaise, Neilson Powless
Overall Étoile de Bessèges, Neilson Powless
Colombia National Road Race Championships, Esteban Chaves
South Africa National Time Trial Championships, Stefan de Bod
Ecuador National Time Trial Championships, Jonathan Caicedo
Ecuador National Road Race Championships, Richard Carapaz
Stages 2 & 3 Volta ao Algarve, Magnus Cort
Stage 2 Settimana Internazionale di Coppi e Bartali, Sean Quinn
Stage 3 Settimana Internazionale di Coppi e Bartali, Ben Healy
GP Industria & Artigianato, Ben Healy
Stage 5 Tour of the Alps, Simon Carr
Stage 8 Giro d'Italia, Ben Healy
Stage 10 Giro d'Italia, Magnus Cort
Mercan'Tour Classic, Richard Carapaz
Stage 1 Route d'Occitanie, Marijn van den Berg
Stage 4 Route d'Occitanie, Simon Carr
Ireland National Road Race Championships, Ben Healy
Stage 2 Tour de l'Ain, Jefferson Alexander Cepeda
Stage 5 Tour de Pologne, Marijn van den Berg
Stage 3 Tour de Luxembourg, Ben Healy
Overall Tour de Langkawi, Simon Carr

Stage 5, Simon Carr

Switzerland National Time Trial Championships, Stefan Bissegger

== 2024 EF Education–EasyPost ==
Trofeo Calvià, Simon Carr
Ecuador National Time Trial Championships, Richard Carapaz
Stage 5 Tour Colombia, Richard Carapaz
Milano–Torino, Alberto Bettiol
Stage 4 Volta a Catalunya, Marijn van den Berg
Stage 4 Settimana Internazionale di Coppi e Bartali, Archie Ryan
Overall Région Pays de la Loire Tour, Marijn van den Berg

Stages 1 & 4, Marijn van den Berg

Stage 4 Tour of the Alps, Simon Carr
Stage 4 Tour de Romandie, Richard Carapaz
Stage 17 Giro d'Italia, Georg Steinhauser
Overall Boucles de la Mayenne, Alberto Bettiol

Stage 2, Alberto Bettiol

Stage 5 Tour of Slovenia, Ben Healy
Portugal National Road Race Championships, Rui Costa
Ireland National Road Race Championships, Darren Rafferty
Italy National Road Race Championships, Alberto Bettiol
Overall Tour de l'Ain, Jefferson Alexander Cepeda

Stage 2, Jefferson Alexander Cepeda

Mountains classification Tour de France, Richard Carapaz

Stage 17, Richard Carapaz

Gran Piemonte, Neilson Powless
Japan Cup, Neilson Powless

== 2025 EF Education–EasyPost ==
Trofeo Ses Salines, Marijn van den Berg

== Supplementary statistics ==
Grand Tours by highest finishing position
Race	2007	2008	2009	2010	2011	2012	2013	2014	2015	2016	2017	2018	2019	2020	2021	2022	2023	2024	2025	2026
Giro d'Italia	–	52	71	57	14	1	49	9	5	7	10	19	11	32	8	9	48	33	3	35
Tour de France	–	4	3	6	8	35	10	53	11	16	2	27	7	8	10	13	66	17	9	8
Vuelta a España	–	–	53	8	13	7	88	7	18	5	7	7	14	3	50	9	23	4	50	
Major week-long stage races by highest finishing position
Race	2007	2008	2009	2010	2011	2012	2013	2014	2015	2016	2017	2018	2019	2020	2021	2022	2023	2024	2025	2026
Tour Down Under	–	–	11	9	1	11	11	5	21	5	14	22	7	15	NH		35	29	26	3
Paris–Nice	–	20	25	12	33	80	2	16	36	16	54	23	18	3	25	47	6	47	31	3
Tirreno–Adriatico	–	8	8	39	85	37	20	17	25	41	8	10	8	8	35	14	8	40	18	8
Volta a Catalunya	28	24	2	6	2	4	1	7	10	10	12	7	6	NH	8	27	10	22	10	10
Tour of the Basque Country	–	–	47	11	9	19	11	13	24	9	9	29	12	NH	12	10	12	16	30	9
Tour de Romandie	–	–	43	13	9	2	4	11	20	15	21	12	10	NH	19	14	24	7	26	16
Critérium du Dauphiné	–	–	9	36	33	44	8	1	7	10	22	8	2	1	24	7	24	29	20	12
Tour de Suisse	–	–	18	24	9	7	8	9	24	5	26	18	27	NH	2	4	6	38	38	2
Tour de Pologne	–	–	50	1	2	16	15	17	9	3	41	16	4	22	38	13	30	9	29	23
BinckBank Tour	–	–	66	5	3	25	19	9	12	51	12	26	9	12	13	NH	19	22	39	12
Monument races by highest finishing position
Monument	2007	2008	2009	2010	2011	2012	2013	2014	2015	2016	2017	2018	2019	2020	2021	2022	2023	2024		
Milan–San Remo	–	24	19	42	18	68	70	11	14	14	37	12	9	18	36	25	7	5		
Tour of Flanders	–	12	4	5	13	30	20	10	37	6	4	13	1	16	28	36	5	9		
Paris–Roubaix	–	4	25	22	1	9	50	8	72	16	3	6	4	NH	11	21	33	26		
Liège–Bastogne–Liège	–	51	11	12	29	5	1	6	32	21	9	2	5	7	31	8	4	26		
Giro di Lombardia	–	91	8	30	2	6	4	1	13	3	15	4	5	14	10	11	8			
Classics by highest finishing position
Classic	2007	2008	2009	2010	2011	2012	2013	2014	2015	2016	2017	2018	2019	2020	2021	2022	2023	2024		
Omloop Het Nieuwsblad	–	12	48	3	7	1	20	12	–	–	3	3	15	23	35	16	16	54		
Kuurne–Brussels–Kuurne	–	24	18	DNF	4	18	NH	10	–	–	19	14	26	11	53	26	–	–		
Strade Bianche	–	4	10	5	12	10	42	–	26	–	57	17	8	4	11	11	27	12		
E3 Harelbeke	–	–	–	–	4	5	33	8	8	19	9	7	4	NH	44	20	15	56		
Gent–Wevelgem	–	–	11	9	3	11	69	45	DNF	DNF	32	11	26	4	50	23	30	12		
Amstel Gold Race	–	73	34	2	28	8	12	14	15	32	21	9	2	NH	13	15	2	11		
La Flèche Wallonne	–	39	25	9	9	6	4	2	9	12	11	28	23	3	35	7	20	13		
Clásica de San Sebastián	–	–	4	6	15	4	43	14	7	8	6	6	9	NH	1	9	4			
Paris–Tours	–	5	46	28	28	32	4	15	–	–	–	7	–	–	–	22	18			

Legend
—	Did not compete
DNF	Did not finish
NH	Not held
