= Vito Braet =

Belgian cyclist (born 2000)

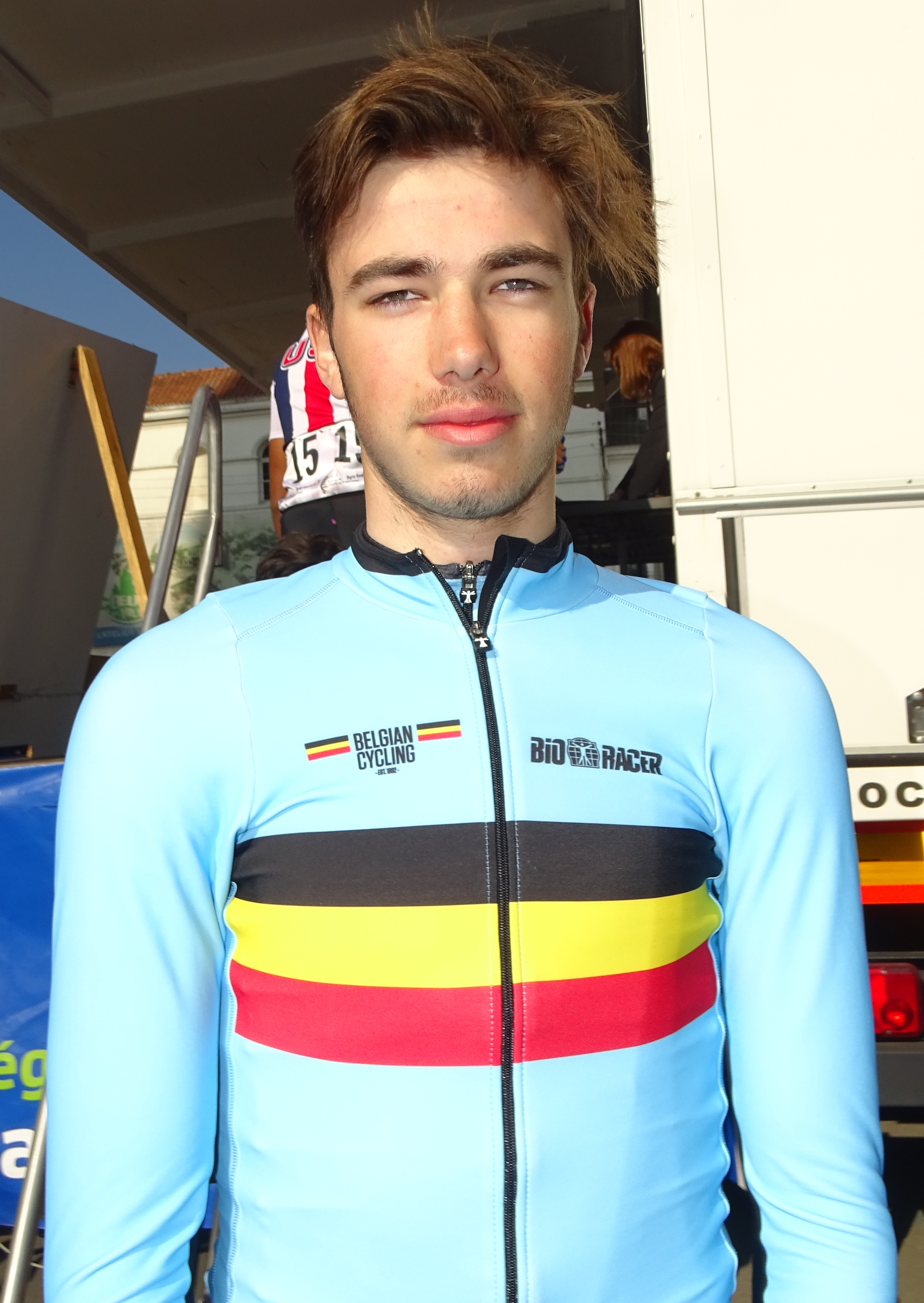
- Braet in 2017

Personal information
- Born: 2 November 2000 (age 25) Torhout, Belgium
- Height: 1.84 m (6 ft 0 in)
- Weight: 70 kg (154 lb)

Cycling career
- Sport: Cycling
- Current team: Lotto–Intermarché
- Discipline: Road
- Role: Rider

Amateur teams
- 2019–2020: EFC–L&R–Vulsteke
- 2021: Lotto–Soudal U23

Professional teams
- 2022–2023: Sport Vlaanderen–Baloise
- 2024–2025: Intermarché–Wanty
- 2026–: Lotto–Intermarché

Vito Braet (born 2 November 2000) is a Belgian racing cyclist, who currently rides for UCI WorldTeam Lotto–Intermarché.

== Major results ==
2017
9th E3 Harelbeke Junioren
2018
1st Keizer der Juniores
1st Johan Museeuw Classic
2nd Road race, National Junior Road Championships
4th Ronde van Vlaanderen Juniores
5th Guido Reybrouck Classic
10th Kuurne–Brussel–Kuurne Juniors
2019
2nd Overall Ronde van Vlaams-Brabant

1st Stage 4 (TTT)

2021
3rd Overall Ronde van Vlaams-Brabant

1st Stage 4

2022
8th Cholet-Pays de la Loire
2023
1st Mountains classification, Étoile de Bessèges
8th Grote Prijs Jean-Pierre Monseré
9th Le Samyn
2024
2nd Figueira Champions Classic
9th Brabantse Pijl
9th Circuit de Wallonie
10th Le Samyn
10th Grote Prijs Jean-Pierre Monseré
2025
5th Bredene Koksijde Classic
2026
9th Dwars door Vlaanderen
10th Grand Prix Criquielion

=== Grand Tour general classification results timeline ===
| Grand Tour | 2024 | 2025 |
|---|---|---|
| Giro d'Italia | — | — |
| Tour de France | — | 143 |
| Vuelta a España | 81 | — |

Legend
| — | Did not compete |
| DNF | Did not finish |
