= 2023 Étoile de Bessèges =

2023 UCI Europe Tour

Race details
- Dates: 1–5 February 2023
- Stages: 5
- Distance: 659.68 km (409.91 mi)

Results
Jersey awarded to the overall winner	Winner	Neilson Powless (USA)	(EF Education–EasyPost)
	Second	Mattias Skjelmose Jensen (DEN)	(Trek–Segafredo)
	Third	Pierre Latour (FRA)	(Team TotalEnergies)
Jersey awarded to the points classification winner	Points	Arnaud De Lie (BEL)	(Lotto–Dstny)
Jersey awarded to the mountains classification winner	Mountains	Vito Braet (BEL)	(Team Flanders–Baloise)
Jersey awarded to the young rider classification winner	Young rider	Mattias Skjelmose Jensen (DEN)	(Trek–Segafredo)
	Team	Team TotalEnergies	

The 2023 Étoile de Bessèges – Tour du Gard (transl. Star of Bessèges – Tour of Gard) was a road cycling stage race that took place between 1 and 5 February 2023 almost entirely within the French department of Gard. The race was rated as a category 2.1 event on the 2023 UCI Europe Tour calendar, and was the 53rd edition of the Étoile de Bessèges.

== Teams ==
Eight of the 18 UCI WorldTeams, eight UCI ProTeams, and four UCI Continental teams make up the 20 teams that participated in the race. Each team entered a full squad of seven riders, for a total of 140 riders who started the race.

UCI WorldTeams

- AG2R Citroën Team
- Alpecin–Deceuninck
- Cofidis
- INEOS Grenadiers
- EF Education–EasyPost
- Groupama–FDJ
- Intermarché–Circus–Wanty
- Trek–Segafredo

UCI ProTeams

- Bingoal WB
- Equipo Kern Pharma
- Israel–Premier Tech
- Lotto–Dstny
- Team Flanders–Baloise
- Team TotalEnergies
- Tudor Pro Cycling Team
- Uno-X Pro Cycling Team

UCI Continental Teams

- Van Rysel–Roubaix–Lille Métropole
- Nice Métropole Côte d'Azur
- St. Michel–Mavic–Auber93
- CIC U Nantes Atlantique

== Route ==
Stage characteristics and winners
Stage	Date	Course	Distance	Type	Stage winner
1	1 February	Bellegarde to Bellegarde	162.18 km (100.77 mi)	Flat stage	Arnaud De Lie (BEL)
2	2 February	Bagard to Aubais	169.63 km (105.40 mi)	Hilly stage	No winner
3	3 February	Bessèges to Bessèges	169.71 km (105.45 mi)	Hilly stage	Arnaud De Lie (BEL)
4	4 February	Saint-Christol-lès-Alès to Mont Bouquet	147.5 km (91.7 mi)	Mountain stage	Mattias Skjelmose Jensen (DEN)
5	5 February	Alès to Alès	10.66 km (6.62 mi)	Individual time trial	Mads Pedersen (DEN)
Total			659.68 km (409.91 mi)		

== Stages ==
=== Stage 1 ===
1 February 2022 – Bellegarde to Bellegarde, 162.18 km (100.77 mi)

Stage 1 Result (1–10)
Rank	Rider	Team	Time
1	Arnaud De Lie (BEL)	Lotto–Dstny	3h 30' 35"
2	Mads Pedersen (DEN)	Trek–Segafredo	+ 0"
3	Benoît Cosnefroy (FRA)	AG2R Citroën Team	+ 0"
4	Dylan Teuns (BEL)	Israel–Premier Tech	+ 3"
5	Andrea Piccolo (ITA)	EF Education–EasyPost	+ 3"
6	Mattias Skjelmose Jensen (DEN)	Trek–Segafredo	+ 5"
7	Neilson Powless (USA)	EF Education–EasyPost	+ 5"
8	Aaron Van Poucke (BEL)	Team Flanders–Baloise	+ 5"
9	Pau Miquel (ESP)	Equipo Kern Pharma	+ 8"
10	Anders Halland Johannessen (NOR)	Uno-X Pro Cycling Team	+ 8"

General classification after Stage 1 (1–10)
Rank	Rider	Team	Time
1	Arnaud De Lie (BEL)	Lotto–Dstny	3h 30' 35"
2	Mads Pedersen (DEN)	Trek–Segafredo	+ 4"
3	Benoît Cosnefroy (FRA)	AG2R Citroën Team	+ 6"
4	Dylan Teuns (BEL)	Israel–Premier Tech	+ 13"
5	Andrea Piccolo (ITA)	EF Education–EasyPost	+ 13"
6	Mattias Skjelmose Jensen (DEN)	Trek–Segafredo	+ 15"
7	Neilson Powless (USA)	EF Education–EasyPost	+ 15"
8	Aaron Van Poucke (BEL)	Team Flanders–Baloise	+ 15"
9	Pau Miquel (ESP)	Equipo Kern Pharma	+ 18"
10	Anders Halland Johannessen (NOR)	Uno-X Pro Cycling Team	+ 18"

=== Stage 2 ===
2 February 2022 – Bagard to Aubais, 169.63 km (105.40 mi)

The stage was neutralised due to a large crash on a bridge about 22 kilometers from the finish. Therefore, no winner was declared and all classifications remained the same from stage 1 heading into stage 3.

=== Stage 3 ===
3 February 2022 – Bessèges to Bessèges, 169.71 km (105.45 mi)

Stage 3 Result (1–10)
Rank	Rider	Team	Time
1	Arnaud De Lie (BEL)	Lotto–Dstny	4h 03' 47"
2	Valentin Ferron (FRA)	Team TotalEnergies	+ 0"
3	Samuel Watson (GBR)	Groupama–FDJ	+ 0"
4	Louis Barré (FRA)	Arkéa–Samsic	+ 0"
5	Sep Vanmarcke (BEL)	Israel–Premier Tech	+ 0"
6	Joel Suter (SUI)	Tudor Pro Cycling Team	+ 0"
7	Rémy Mertz (BEL)	Bingoal WB	+ 0"
8	Pierre Latour (FRA)	Team TotalEnergies	+ 0"
9	Greg van Avermaet (BEL)	AG2R Citroën Team	+ 0"
10	Franck Bonnamour (FRA)	AG2R Citroën Team	+ 0"

General classification after Stage 3 (1–10)
Rank	Rider	Team	Time
1	Arnaud De Lie (BEL)	Lotto–Dstny	7h 34' 02"
2	Benoît Cosnefroy (FRA)	AG2R Citroën Team	+ 16"
3	Dylan Teuns (BEL)	Israel–Premier Tech	+ 23"
4	Samuel Watson (GBR)	Groupama–FDJ	+ 24"
5	Mattias Skjelmose Jensen (DEN)	Trek–Segafredo	+ 25"
6	Neilson Powless (USA)	EF Education–EasyPost	+ 25"
7	Pierre Latour (FRA)	Team TotalEnergies	+ 28"
8	Ben Tulett (GBR)	INEOS Grenadiers	+ 28"
9	Krists Neilands (LAT)	Israel–Premier Tech	+ 28"
10	Pau Miquel (ESP)	Equipo Kern Pharma	+ 28"

=== Stage 4 ===
4 February 2022 – Saint-Christol-lès-Alès to Mont Bouquet, 147.5 km (91.7 mi)

Stage 4 Result (1–10)
Rank	Rider	Team	Time
1	Mattias Skjelmose Jensen (DEN)	Trek–Segafredo	3h 22' 23"
2	Neilson Powless (USA)	EF Education–EasyPost	+ 0"
3	Pierre Latour (FRA)	Team TotalEnergies	+ 13"
4	Pavel Sivakov (FRA)	INEOS Grenadiers	+ 19"
5	Kévin Vauquelin (FRA)	Arkéa–Samsic	+ 1' 06"
6	Thibaut Pinot (FRA)	Groupama–FDJ	+ 1' 17"
7	Hugo Houle (CAN)	Israel–Premier Tech	+ 1' 30"
8	Arnaud De Lie (BEL)	Lotto–Dstny	+ 1' 34"
9	Julien Bernard (FRA)	Trek–Segafredo	+ 1' 40"
10	Axel Laurance (FRA)	Alpecin–Deceuninck	+ 1' 53"

General classification after Stage 4 (1–10)
Rank	Rider	Team	Time
1	Mattias Skjelmose Jensen (DEN)	Trek–Segafredo	10h 56' 40"
2	Neilson Powless (USA)	EF Education–EasyPost	+ 4"
3	Pierre Latour (FRA)	Team TotalEnergies	+ 22"
4	Pavel Sivakov (FRA)	INEOS Grenadiers	+ 1' 00"
5	Arnaud De Lie (BEL)	Lotto–Dstny	+ 1' 19"
6	Kévin Vauquelin (FRA)	Arkéa–Samsic	+ 1' 26"
7	Thibaut Pinot (FRA)	Groupama–FDJ	+ 1' 37"
8	Hugo Houle (CAN)	Israel–Premier Tech	+ 1' 50"
9	Krists Neilands (LAT)	Israel–Premier Tech	+ 2' 13"
10	Anthony Perez (FRA)	Cofidis	+ 2' 13"

=== Stage 5 ===
5 February 2022 – Alès to Alès, 10.66 km (6.62 mi), (ITT)

Stage 5 Result (1–10)
Rank	Rider	Team	Time
1	Mads Pedersen (DEN)	Trek–Segafredo	15' 25"
2	Joshua Tarling (GBR)	INEOS Grenadiers	+ 8"
3	Ben Tulett (GBR)	INEOS Grenadiers	+ 10"
4	Kévin Vauquelin (FRA)	Arkéa–Samsic	+ 11"
5	Pierre Latour (FRA)	Team TotalEnergies	+ 15"
6	Magnus Cort (DEN)	EF Education–EasyPost	+ 20"
7	Ben Turner (GBR)	INEOS Grenadiers	+ 20"
8	Neilson Powless (USA)	EF Education–EasyPost	+ 21"
9	Mattias Skjelmose Jensen (DEN)	Trek–Segafredo	+ 26"
10	Bruno Armirail (FRA)	Groupama–FDJ	+ 26"

General classification after Stage 5 (1–10)
Rank	Rider	Team	Time
1	Neilson Powless (USA)	EF Education–EasyPost	11h 12' 30"
2	Mattias Skjelmose Jensen (DEN)	Trek–Segafredo	+ 1"
3	Pierre Latour (FRA)	Team TotalEnergies	+ 12"
4	Kévin Vauquelin (FRA)	Arkéa–Samsic	+ 1' 12"
5	Pavel Sivakov (FRA)	INEOS Grenadiers	+ 1' 27"
6	Thibaut Pinot (FRA)	Groupama–FDJ	+ 1' 58"
7	Arnaud De Lie (BEL)	Lotto–Dstny	+ 2' 04"
8	Hugo Houle (CAN)	Israel–Premier Tech	+ 2' 27"
9	Anthony Perez (FRA)	Cofidis	+ 2' 36"
10	Joel Suter (SUI)	Tudor Pro Cycling Team	+ 2' 53"

== Classification leadership table ==
Classification leadership by stage
Stage	Winner	General classification (Note: The general classification leader's jersey is known as the coral jersey.)	Points classification	Mountains classification	Young rider classification	Team classification
1	Arnaud De Lie	Arnaud De Lie	Arnaud De Lie	Ayco Bastiaens	Arnaud De Lie	EF Education–EasyPost
2	No winner	Arnaud De Lie	Arnaud De Lie	Ayco Bastiaens	Arnaud De Lie	EF Education–EasyPost
3	Arnaud De Lie	Arnaud De Lie	Arnaud De Lie	Vito Braet	Arnaud De Lie	Israel–Premier Tech
4	Mattias Skjelmose Jensen	Mattias Skjelmose Jensen	Arnaud De Lie	Vito Braet	Mattias Skjelmose Jensen	Team TotalEnergies
5	Neilson Powless	Neilson Powless	Arnaud De Lie	Vito Braet	Mattias Skjelmose Jensen	Team TotalEnergies
Final		Neilson Powless	Arnaud De Lie	Vito Braet	Mattias Skjelmose Jensen	Team TotalEnergies

- On stage 2, Mads Pedersen, who is second in the points classification, will wear the yellow jersey, because first-placed Arnaud De Lie will wear the coral jersey as the leader of the general classification. For the same reason, Andrea Piccolo will wear the white jersey for being second in the young rider classification.

== Current classification standings ==
Legend
Denotes the leader of the general classification	Denotes the leader of the mountains classification
Denotes the leader of the points classification	Denotes the leader of the young rider classification

=== General classification ===
Final general classification (1–10)
Rank	Rider	Team	Time
1	Neilson Powless (USA)	EF Education–EasyPost	11h 12' 30"
2	Mattias Skjelmose Jensen (DEN)	Trek–Segafredo	+ 1"
3	Pierre Latour (FRA)	Team TotalEnergies	+ 12"
4	Kévin Vauquelin (FRA)	Arkéa–Samsic	+ 1' 12"
5	Pavel Sivakov (FRA)	INEOS Grenadiers	+ 1' 27"
6	Thibaut Pinot (FRA)	Groupama–FDJ	+ 1' 58"
7	Arnaud De Lie (BEL)	Lotto–Dstny	+ 2' 04"
8	Hugo Houle (CAN)	Israel–Premier Tech	+ 2' 27"
9	Anthony Perez (FRA)	Cofidis	+ 2' 36"
10	Joel Suter (SUI)	Tudor Pro Cycling Team	+ 2' 53"

=== Points classification ===
Final points classification (1–10)
Rank	Rider	Team	Points
1	Arnaud De Lie (BEL)	Lotto–Dstny	58
2	Mattias Skjelmose Jensen (DEN)	Trek–Segafredo	46
3	Mads Pedersen (DEN)	Trek–Segafredo	45
4	Neilson Powless (USA)	EF Education–EasyPost	38
5	Pierre Latour (FRA)	Team TotalEnergies	38
6	Kévin Vauquelin (FRA)	Arkéa–Samsic	31
7	Samuel Watson (GBR)	Groupama–FDJ	21
8	Valentin Ferron (FRA)	Team TotalEnergies	20
9	Ben Tulett (GBR)	INEOS Grenadiers	20
10	Joshua Tarling (GBR)	INEOS Grenadiers	20

=== Mountains classification ===
Final mountains classification (1–10)
Rank	Rider	Team	Points
1	Vito Braet (BEL)	Team Flanders–Baloise	34
2	Neilson Powless (USA)	EF Education–EasyPost	26
3	Mattias Skjelmose Jensen (DEN)	Trek–Segafredo	23
4	Dries De Bondt (BEL)	Alpecin–Deceuninck	18
5	Kévin Vauquelin (FRA)	Arkéa–Samsic	16
6	Ben Turner (GBR)	INEOS Grenadiers	14
7	Thomas Champion (FRA)	Cofidis	14
8	Mads Pedersen (DEN)	Trek–Segafredo	13
9	Andrea Mifsud (FRA)	Nice Métropole Côte d'Azur	12
10	Ben Tulett (GBR)	INEOS Grenadiers	10

=== Young rider classification ===
Final young rider classification (1–10)
Rank	Rider	Team	Time
1	Mattias Skjelmose Jensen (DEN)	Trek–Segafredo	11h 12' 31"
2	Kévin Vauquelin (FRA)	Arkéa–Samsic	+ 1' 11"
3	Arnaud De Lie (BEL)	Lotto–Dstny	+ 2' 03"
4	Pau Miquel (ESP)	Equipo Kern Pharma	+ 3' 07"
5	Axel Laurance (FRA)	Alpecin–Deceuninck	+ 3' 58"
6	Raúl García Pierna (ESP)	Equipo Kern Pharma	+ 4' 09"
7	Jenno Berckmoes (BEL)	Team Flanders–Baloise	+ 5' 32"
8	Louis Barré (FRA)	Arkéa–Samsic	+ 8' 31"
9	Petr Kelemen (CZE)	Tudor Pro Cycling Team	+ 10' 13"
10	Luca Van Boven (BEL)	Bingoal WB	+ 12' 22"

=== Team classification ===
Final team classification (1–10)
Rank	Team	Time
1	Team TotalEnergies	33h 44' 32"
2	Israel–Premier Tech	+ 1' 37"
3	Cofidis	+ 5' 33"
4	AG2R Citroën Team	+ 7' 07"
5	Tudor Pro Cycling Team	+ 7' 43"
6	Lotto–Dstny	+ 8' 18"
7	Trek–Segafredo	+ 8' 50"
8	Uno-X Pro Cycling Team	+ 11' 07"
9	Arkéa–Samsic	+ 13' 58"
10	INEOS Grenadiers	+ 15' 25"
