= Ilan Van Wilder =

Belgian cyclist

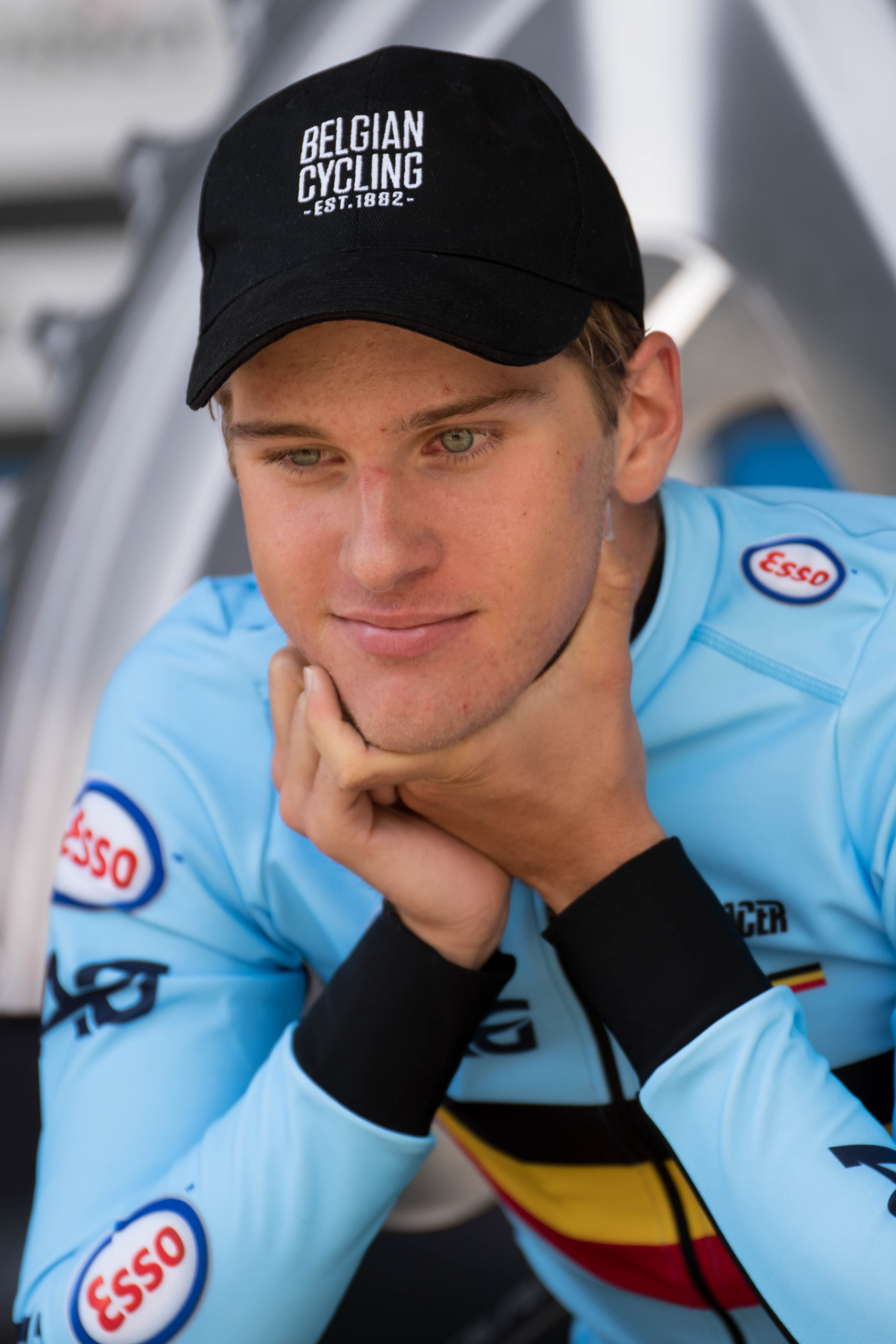
- Van Wilder at the 2018 UCI Road World Championships

Personal information
- Born: 14 May 2000 (age 26) Jette, Belgium
- Height: 1.71 m (5 ft 7 in)
- Weight: 64 kg (141 lb)

Cycling career
- Sport: Cycling
- Current team: Soudal–Quick-Step
- Discipline: Road
- Role: Rider
- Rider type: All Rounder

Amateur team
- 2019: Lotto–Soudal U23

Professional teams
- 2020–2021: Team Sunweb
- 2022–: Quick-Step Alpha Vinyl Team

Major wins
- Stage races Deutschland Tour (2023) One-day races and Classics Tre Valli Varesine (2023)
Medal record
Representing Belgium
Men's road bicycle racing
World Championships
Bronze medal – third place	2025 Kigali	Elite time trial
European Championships
Silver medal – second place	2018 Brno	Junior time trial
Bronze medal – third place	2020 Plouay	Under-23 time trial

Ilan Van Wilder (born 14 May 2000) is a Belgian cyclist, who currently rides for UCI WorldTeam Soudal–Quick-Step. He has completed all three of the Grand Tours.

== Major results ==
2017
2nd La Route des Géants
6th Overall Driedaagse van Axel

1st Young rider classification

6th La Philippe Gilbert juniors
6th Overall Aubel–Thimister–La Gleize
7th La Classique des Alpes Juniors
8th Overall Oberösterreich Juniorenrundfahrt
8th Overall Course de la Paix Juniors
9th Overall GP Général Patton
2018
1st Nokere Koerse Juniors
UEC European Junior Road Championships

2nd Time trial
4th Road race

2nd Time trial, National Junior Road Championships
2nd Overall Giro della Lunigiana
2nd Overall Oberösterreich Juniorenrundfahrt
3rd Guido Reybrouck Classic
5th Overall Aubel–Thimister–Stavelot
6th Overall Driedaagse van Axel

1st Stage 2 (ITT)

7th Time trial, UCI Junior Road World Championships
7th Overall GP Général Patton
8th Gent–Wevelgem Juniors
9th Overall Course de la Paix Juniors
2019
1st Young rider classification, Le Triptyque des Monts et Châteaux
3rd Time trial, National Under-23 Road Championships
3rd Overall Tour de l'Avenir
3rd Overall Orlen Nations Grand Prix
4th Overall Grand Prix Priessnitz spa

1st Stage 2

7th Overall Ronde de l'Isard
9th Time trial, UEC European Under-23 Road Championships
2020
3rd Time trial, UEC European Under-23 Road Championships
2021
4th Time trial, National Road Championships
10th Overall Settimana Internazionale di Coppi e Bartali
2022
4th Overall Vuelta a Burgos
6th Overall Tour de la Provence
2023 (3 pro wins)
1st Overall Deutschland Tour

1st Young rider classification
1st Stage 1

1st Tre Valli Varesine
3rd Overall Volta ao Algarve
3rd Trofeo Serra de Tramuntana
4th Overall Tour de Luxembourg
4th Overall Tour de Pologne
5th Time trial, National Road Championships
2024
2nd Japan Cup
4th Overall Tour de Romandie
4th Overall UAE Tour
5th Trofeo Serra de Tramuntana
5th Trofeo Pollença–Port d'Andratx
10th Trofeo Calvià
2025
3rd Time trial, UCI Road World Championships
6th Overall Tour of the Basque Country
7th Overall Tour of Britain
7th Overall Volta ao Algarve
8th Overall Tour de Suisse
10th Overall Paris–Nice
2026
4th Time trial, UEC European Road Championships
5th Overall Tour de Suisse

=== Grand Tour general classification results timeline ===
Grand Tour	2020	2021	2022	2023	2024	2025	2026
Giro d'Italia	—	—	—	12	—	—	—
Tour de France	—	—	—	—	26	32	
Vuelta a España	DNF	—	40	—	—	—	
Major stage race general classification results
Major stage race	2020	2021	2022	2023	2024	2025	2026
Paris–Nice	—	—	—	—	22	10	—
Tirreno–Adriatico	—	—	—	—	—	—	DNF
Volta a Catalunya	NH	—	DNF	43	DNF	—	—
Tour of the Basque Country	NH	29	—	—	—	6	DNF
Tour de Romandie	NH	16	—	—	4	—	—
Critérium du Dauphiné	—	44	—	—	DNF	—	—
Tour de Suisse	NH	—	DNF	—	—	8	5

Legend
—	Did not compete
DNF	Did not finish
NH	Not held
