= Neilson Powless =

American and Oneida Nation cyclist (born 1996)

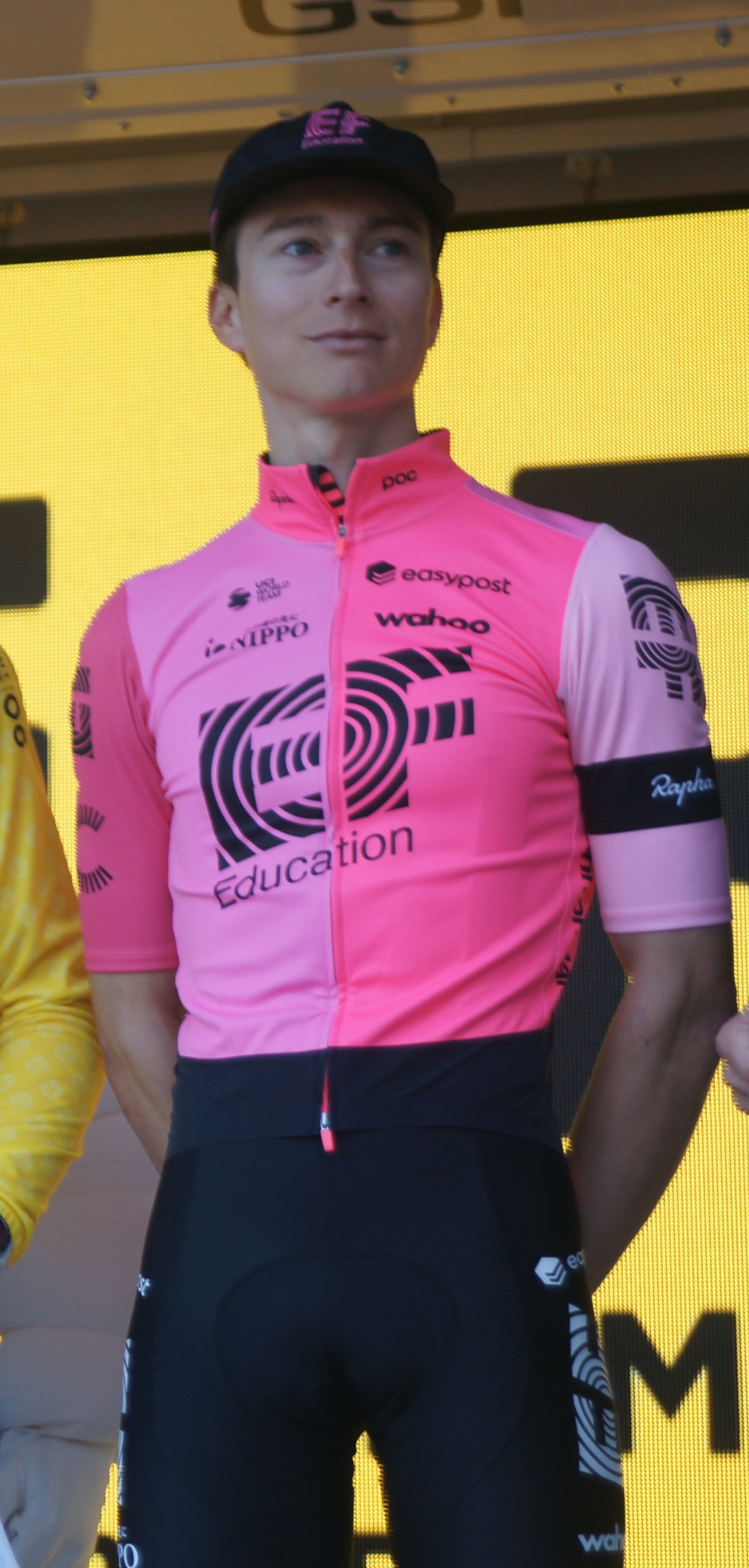
- Powless in 2023

Personal information
- Full name: Neilson Powless
- Born: September 3, 1996 (age 30) Eglin Air Force Base, Florida, U.S.
- Height: 1.83 m (6 ft 0 in)
- Weight: 67 kg (148 lb)

Cycling career
- Sport: Cycling
- Current team: EF Education–EasyPost
- Discipline: Road
- Role: Rider
- Rider type: Puncheur, Classics specialist

Professional teams
- 2016–2017: Axeon–Hagens Berman
- 2018–2019: LottoNL–Jumbo
- 2020–: EF Pro Cycling

Major wins
- One-day races and Classics Dwars door Vlaanderen (2025) Clásica de San Sebastián (2021) Gran Piemonte (2024) Japan Cup (2022, 2024)

Neilson Hunter Powless (born September 3, 1996) is an American and Oneida Nation professional road racing cyclist who currently rides for UCI WorldTeam EF Education–EasyPost. Powless is the first US Native American to compete in the Tour de France.

== Career ==
=== Early career 2018–2021 ===
Powless turned professional with LottoNL–Jumbo in 2018. He competed in his first Grand Tour at the 2019 Vuelta a España. Powless, along with Jumbo-Visma teammates Robert Gesink, George Bennett and Sepp Kuss, each finished between 27th and 33rd in the overall standings en route to assisting Primož Roglič in winning the race.

The next season he moved to EF Pro Cycling. He was named on the startlist for the 2020 Tour de France. He rode in support of GC contender and team leader Rigoberto Urán. During this tour he got involved in a breakaway and earned a top 5 stage finish.

Following his strong debut, Powless again was named as part of the EF Team for the 2021 Tour de France. Early in the season he finished 5th in the 2021 UAE Tour, in July he won the 2021 Clásica de San Sebastián, becoming only the second American to do so, and late in the season he finished 5th in the UCI world championship.

=== 2022–present ===
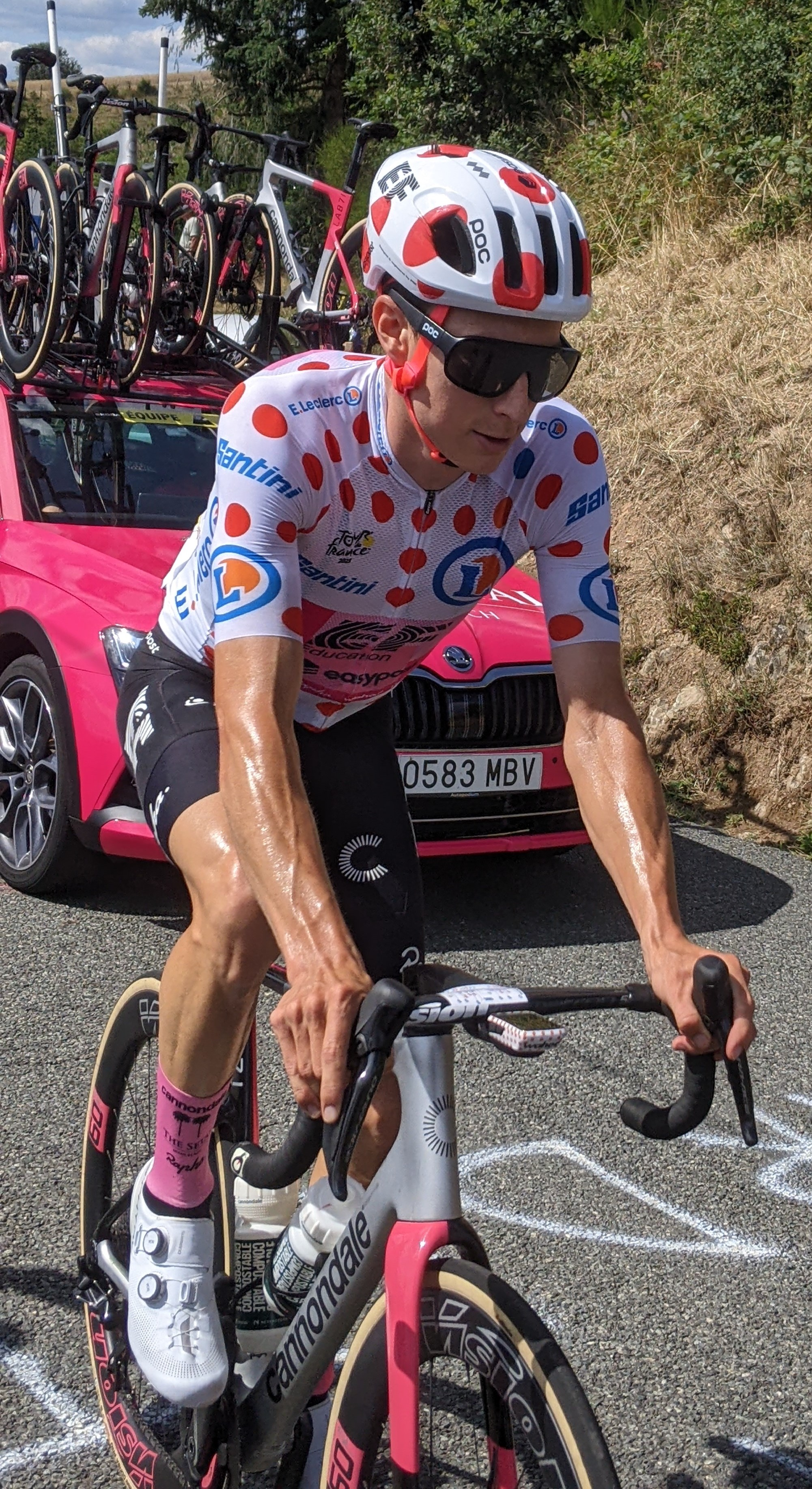
Powless in the polkadot jersey at the 2023 Tour de France

During the 2022 Tour de Suisse Powless was active in several breakaways and stayed with the overall leaders throughout the entire race finishing in 4th place overall.

He was added to the start list for the 2022 Tour de France, joining Nairo Quintana as the other Indigenous American rider to start the race. On stage 5 of the Tour, a particularly brutal stage with many cobbled sections, he joined a breakaway that survived to the finish. Overall leader Wout van Aert crashed multiple times giving Powless the chance to move into the yellow jersey. Van Aert was able to limit his losses, but Powless moved into 2nd place overall. At +0:13 this was the closest an American had come to wearing the leader's jersey since Tejay van Garderen tied for the lead in the first week of the 2018 edition. The next day he came within +0:04 of the lead, but Tadej Pogačar seized control of the race and on stage 7 Powless began to fall back. Powless was active in other breakaways throughout the race including being the only rider to attack on kilometer zero of stage 12, which culminated on Alpe d'Huez. Several dozen riders attacked throughout the day but very few survived ahead of the GC favorites. Powless did survive, and placed fourth, he also advanced as high as 3rd place in the mountains classification by the start of the third week. He ultimately finished the Tour in 13th (subsequently upgraded to 12th), the highest ranked rider on the team and the only Team EF rider inside the top 25.

He ended the 2022 season with a solo victory at the Japan Cup.

Powless started the 2023 season with success, winning both the Étoile de Bessèges stage race and the single-day Grand Prix La Marseillaise. He then saw multiple top 10 finishes in the spring World Tour races, including the Tour of Flanders, Dwars door Vlaanderen, Paris–Nice and Milan–San Remo.

He was again selected to race in the Tour de France, where he led the mountains classification for all but one of the first thirteen stages. He ultimately lost the lead to Giulio Ciccone and finished fourth.

In April 2025, Powless won Dwars door Vlaanderen, outsprinting Van Aert and two other Visma–Lease a Bike riders from a four-person breakaway group. Van Aert suffered cramp in the final. Powless described the result as his biggest win, and earned comparisons with the 2015 Omloop Het Nieuwsblad, where Ian Stannard similarly defeated three Etixx–Quick-Step riders in the leading group to win.

Powless suffered with knee inflammation during the winter of 2025, and despite returning to racing at the Tour de la Provence, he abandoned stage three. At the end of February 2026, Powless underwent surgery to remove the inflamed tissue, meaning he would be out for eight to twelve weeks, missing the spring classics season.

Powless returned to racing at the Tour of Austria. He won the third stage, in a two-man sprint from the breakaway.

== Personal life ==
His mother Jen Allred ran the marathon for Guam at the 1992 Summer Olympics. His older sister is fellow professional racing cyclist Shayna Powless.

Powless married Frances Powless (née Chae) in 2020. The couple are parents of two children, Charlotte Ann Powless, born September 2023, and Remy Young Powless, born October 2025. The couple live in Nice.

== Major results ==
2016
1st Overall Joe Martin Stage Race
1st Stage 8 Tour de l'Avenir
1st Stage 3 Redlands Bicycle Classic
1st Stage 3a (ITT) Tour de Beauce
1st Stage 1 (TTT) Olympia's Tour
9th Overall Tour of California

1st Young rider classification

2017
National Under-23 Road Championships

1st Road race
3rd Time trial

1st Gran Premio Palio del Recioto
National Road Championships

2nd Road race
3rd Time trial

3rd Overall Le Triptyque des Monts et Châteaux

1st Stage 3a (ITT)

4th Overall Tour of Utah

1st Young rider classification

6th Overall Giro Ciclistico d'Italia

1st Stage 1

6th Giro del Belvedere
2018
7th Overall Tour of Britain

1st Stage 5 (TTT)

9th Overall Settimana Internazionale di Coppi e Bartali
10th Raiffeisen Grand Prix
2019
National Road Championships

2nd Time trial
3rd Road race

7th Overall Volta ao Algarve
7th Japan Cup
2020
4th Overall Herald Sun Tour
2021 (1 pro win)
1st Clásica de San Sebastián
5th Road race, UCI Road World Championships
5th Overall UAE Tour
6th Coppa Sabatini
2022 (1)
1st Japan Cup
3rd Maryland Cycling Classic
4th Overall Tour de Suisse
8th Liège–Bastogne–Liège
2023 (2)
1st Overall Étoile de Bessèges
1st Grand Prix La Marseillaise
2nd Maryland Cycling Classic
3rd Overall Tour des Alpes-Maritimes et du Var
3rd Dwars door Vlaanderen
4th Clásica de San Sebastián
5th Tour of Flanders
6th Overall Paris–Nice
7th Milan–San Remo
Tour de France

Held after Stages 1–4 & 6–13
Combativity award Stage 2

2024 (2)
1st Gran Piemonte
1st Japan Cup
National Road Championships

3rd Road race
3rd Time trial

4th Coppa Bernocchi
6th Clásica de San Sebastián
8th Giro di Lombardia
8th Grand Prix Cycliste de Québec
2025 (2)
1st Dwars door Vlaanderen
1st GP Gippingen
4th Eschborn–Frankfurt
4th Grand Prix Cycliste de Montréal
4th Trofeo Laigueglia
6th Overall Volta ao Algarve
6th Clásica de San Sebastián
7th Brabantse Pijl
7th Gran Piemonte
10th Liège–Bastogne–Liège
2026 (1)
1st Stage 3 Tour of Austria

=== General classification results timeline ===
Grand Tour general classification results
Grand Tour	2018	2019	2020	2021	2022	2023	2024	2025
Giro d'Italia	—	—	—	—	—	—	—	—
Tour de France	—	—	56	43	12	66	59	47
Vuelta a España	—	31	—	—	—	—	—	—
Major stage race general classification results
Race	2018	2019	2020	2021	2022	2023	2024	2025
Paris–Nice	—	—	—	25	DNF	6	—	31
Tirreno–Adriatico	—	—	—	—	—	—	DNF	—
Volta a Catalunya	—	—	NH	—	DNF	—	—	—
Tour of the Basque Country	DNF	79	NH	—	—	—	—	—
Tour de Romandie	—	DNF	NH	87	14	—	—	—
Critérium du Dauphiné	82	24	—	—	—	—	DNF	—
Tour de Suisse	—	—	NH	14	4	20	—	38

=== Classics results timeline ===
Monument	2018	2019	2020	2021	2022	2023	2024	2025
Milan–San Remo	83	—	—	—	—	7	—	37
Tour of Flanders	—	—	—	—	—	5	—	42
Paris–Roubaix	—	—	NH	—	—	—	—	—
Liège–Bastogne–Liège	—	—	92	—	8	65	—	10
Giro di Lombardia	—	62	—	51	34	—	8	
Classic	2018	2019	2020	2021	2022	2023	2024	2025
Strade Bianche	—	DNF	—	—	—	—	86	—
Dwars door Vlaanderen	—	—	—	—	—	3	—	1
Brabantse Pijl	—	—	—	—	—	—	—	7
Amstel Gold Race	—	—	NH	—	—	DNF	—	13
La Flèche Wallonne	—	—	—	—	19	DNF	—	45
Eschborn–Frankfurt	—	—	NH	—	—	—	22	4
Clásica de San Sebastián	—	—	NH	1	—	4	6	6
Grand Prix Cycliste de Québec	—	—	NH	NH	23	20	8	25
Grand Prix Cycliste de Montréal	—	—	NH	NH	DNF	33	23	4
Gran Piemonte	—	—	—	—	19	—	1	7

Legend
—	Did not compete
DNF	Did not finish
