= 2022 Tour de Suisse =

Swiss cycling race

2022 UCI World Tour, race 22 of 32
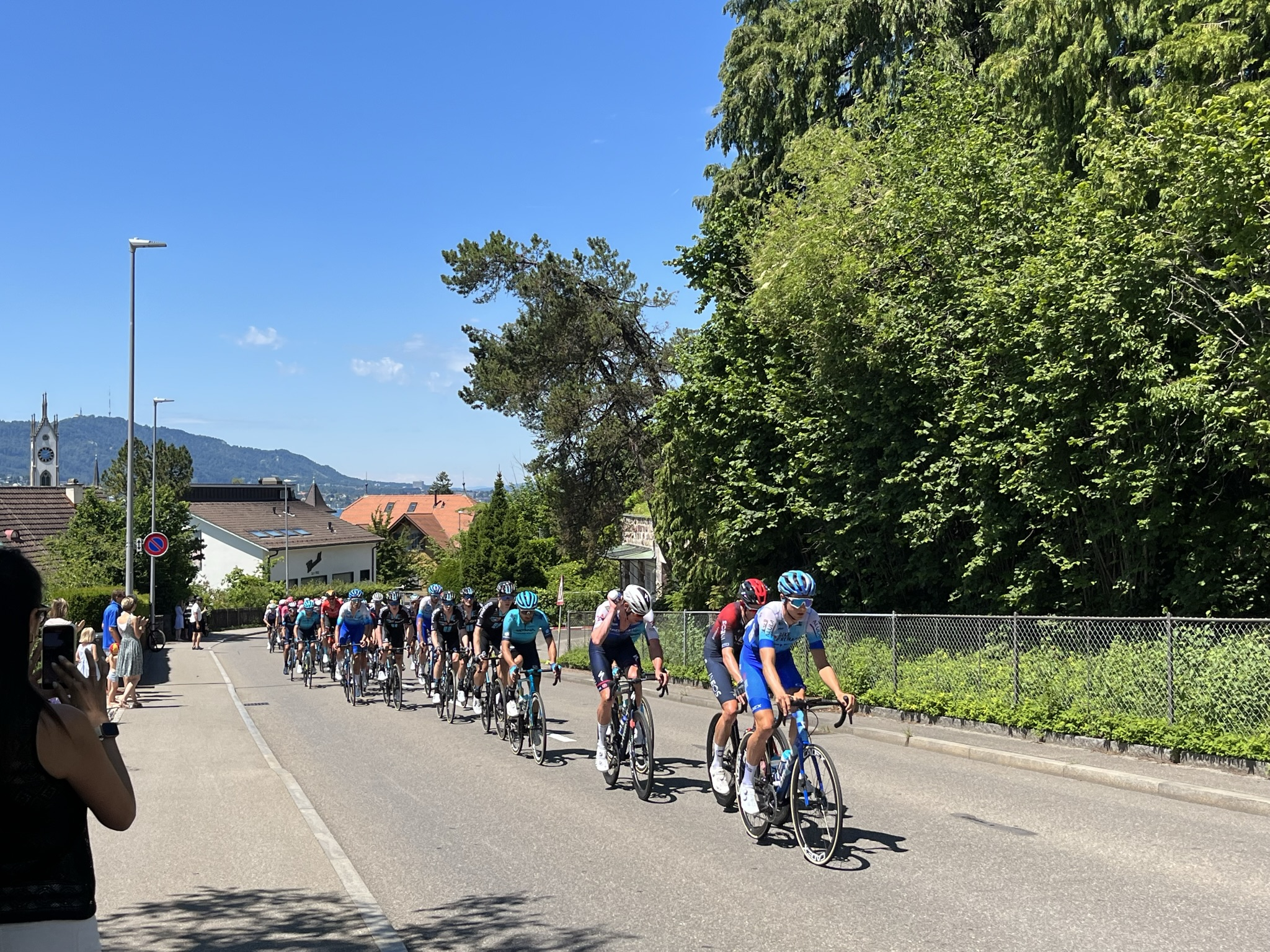
- The cycling pros at the Tour de Suisse 2022 in Küsnacht ZH

Race details
- Dates: 12–19 June 2022
- Stages: 8
- Distance: 1,339.6 km (832.4 mi)
- Winning time: 33h 07' 09"

Results
Jersey awarded to the overall winner	Winner	Geraint Thomas (GBR)	(Ineos Grenadiers)
	Second	Sergio Higuita (COL)	(Bora–Hansgrohe)
	Third	Jakob Fuglsang (DEN)	(Israel–Premier Tech)
Jersey awarded to the mountains classification winner	Mountains	Quinn Simmons (USA)	(Trek–Segafredo)
Jersey awarded to the youth classification winner	Youth	Sergio Higuita (COL)	(Bora–Hansgrohe)
Jersey awarded to the sprints classification winner	Sprints	Michael Matthews (AUS)	(Team BikeExchange–Jayco)
	Team	Bora–Hansgrohe	

The 2022 Tour de Suisse was a road cycling stage race that took place between 12 and 19 June 2022 in Switzerland and Liechtenstein. It was the 85th edition of the Tour de Suisse and the 22nd event of the 2022 UCI World Tour.

== Teams ==
All eighteen UCI WorldTeams are joined by three UCI ProTeams and the Swiss national team to make up the twenty-two teams that are participating in the race.

UCI WorldTeams

- AG2R Citroën Team
- Astana Qazaqstan Team
- Bora–Hansgrohe
- Cofidis
- EF Education–EasyPost
- Groupama–FDJ
- Ineos Grenadiers
- Intermarché–Wanty–Gobert Matériaux
- Israel–Premier Tech
- Lotto–Soudal
- Movistar Team
- Quick-Step Alpha Vinyl Team
- Team Bahrain Victorious
- Team BikeExchange–Jayco
- Team DSM
- Team Jumbo–Visma
- Trek–Segafredo
- UAE Team Emirates

UCI ProTeams

- Alpecin–Fenix
- Human Powered Health
- Team TotalEnergies

National Teams

- Switzerland

== Route ==
Stage characteristics and winners
Stage	Date	Route	Distance	Type	Winner
1	12 June	Küsnacht to Küsnacht	178 km (111 mi)	Hilly stage	Stephen Williams (GBR)
2	13 June	Küsnacht to Aesch	199 km (124 mi)	Hilly stage	Andreas Leknessund (NOR)
3	14 June	Aesch to Grenchen	177 km (110 mi)	Medium mountain stage	Peter Sagan (SVK)
4	15 June	Grenchen to Brunnen	191 km (119 mi)	Hilly stage	Daryl Impey (RSA)
5	16 June	Ambrì to Novazzano	193 km (120 mi)	Hilly stage	Aleksandr Vlasov^{[a]}
6	17 June	Locarno to Moosalp	180 km (110 mi)	Mountain stage	Nico Denz (GER)
7	18 June	Ambrì to (Liechtenstein) Malbun	196 km (122 mi)	Mountain stage	Thibaut Pinot (FRA)
8	19 June	(Liechtenstein) Vaduz to (Liechtenstein) Vaduz	25.6 km (15.9 mi)	Individual time trial	Remco Evenepoel (BEL)
Total			1,339.6 km (832.4 mi)		

== Stages ==
=== Stage 1 ===
12 June 2022 — Küsnacht to Küsnacht, 178 km (111 mi)

Stage 1 Result
Rank	Rider	Team	Time
1	Stephen Williams (GBR)	Team Bahrain Victorious	4h 16' 51"
2	Maximilian Schachmann (GER)	Bora–Hansgrohe	+ 0"
3	Andreas Kron (DEN)	Lotto–Soudal	+ 0"
4	Marc Hirschi (SUI)	UAE Team Emirates	+ 0"
5	Alexey Lutsenko (KAZ)	Astana Qazaqstan Team	+ 0"
6	Ilan Van Wilder (BEL)	Quick-Step Alpha Vinyl Team	+ 0"
7	Stefan Küng (SUI)	Groupama–FDJ	+ 0"
8	Sergio Higuita (COL)	Bora–Hansgrohe	+ 0"
9	Sepp Kuss (USA)	Team Jumbo–Visma	+ 0"
10	Domenico Pozzovivo (ITA)	Intermarché–Wanty–Gobert Matériaux	+ 0"

General classification after Stage 1
Rank	Rider	Team	Time
1	Stephen Williams (GBR)	Team Bahrain Victorious	4h 16' 41"
2	Maximilian Schachmann (GER)	Bora–Hansgrohe	+ 4"
3	Andreas Kron (DEN)	Lotto–Soudal	+ 6"
4	Marc Hirschi (SUI)	UAE Team Emirates	+ 10"
5	Alexey Lutsenko (KAZ)	Astana Qazaqstan Team	+ 10"
6	Ilan Van Wilder (BEL)	Quick-Step Alpha Vinyl Team	+ 10"
7	Stefan Küng (SUI)	Groupama–FDJ	+ 10"
8	Sergio Higuita (COL)	Bora–Hansgrohe	+ 10"
9	Sepp Kuss (USA)	Team Jumbo–Visma	+ 10"
10	Domenico Pozzovivo (ITA)	Intermarché–Wanty–Gobert Matériaux	+ 10"

=== Stage 2 ===
13 June 2022 — Küsnacht to Aesch, 199 km (124 mi)

Stage 2 Result
Rank	Rider	Team	Time
1	Andreas Leknessund (NOR)	Team DSM	4h 46' 22"
2	Alberto Bettiol (ITA)	EF Education–EasyPost	+ 38"
3	Michael Matthews (AUS)	Team BikeExchange–Jayco	+ 38"
4	Andrea Pasqualon (ITA)	Intermarché–Wanty–Gobert Matériaux	+ 38"
5	Matteo Trentin (ITA)	UAE Team Emirates	+ 38"
6	Nikias Arndt (GER)	Team DSM	+ 38"
7	Stefan Küng (SUI)	Groupama–FDJ	+ 38"
8	Edoardo Zambanini (ITA)	Team Bahrain Victorious	+ 38"
9	Daniel Oss (ITA)	Team TotalEnergies	+ 38"
10	Stefano Oldani (ITA)	Alpecin–Fenix	+ 38"

General classification after Stage 2
Rank	Rider	Team	Time
1	Stephen Williams (GBR)	Team Bahrain Victorious	9h 03' 41"
2	Maximilian Schachmann (GER)	Bora–Hansgrohe	+ 4"
3	Andreas Kron (DEN)	Lotto–Soudal	+ 6"
4	Andreas Leknessund (NOR)	Team DSM	+ 7"
5	Stefan Küng (SUI)	Groupama–FDJ	+ 10"
6	Alexey Lutsenko (KAZ)	Astana Qazaqstan Team	+ 10"
7	Sepp Kuss (USA)	Team Jumbo–Visma	+ 10"
8	Marc Hirschi (SUI)	UAE Team Emirates	+ 10"
9	Domenico Pozzovivo (ITA)	Intermarché–Wanty–Gobert Matériaux	+ 10"
10	Aleksandr Vlasov^{[a]}	Bora–Hansgrohe	+ 10"

=== Stage 3 ===
14 June 2022 — Aesch to Grenchen, 177 km (110 mi)

Stage 3 Result
Rank	Rider	Team	Time
1	Peter Sagan (SVK)	Team TotalEnergies	4h 28' 38"
2	Bryan Coquard (FRA)	Cofidis	+ 0"
3	Alexander Kristoff (NOR)	Intermarché–Wanty–Gobert Matériaux	+ 0"
4	Thomas Pidcock (GBR)	Ineos Grenadiers	+ 0"
5	Alex Aranburu (ESP)	Movistar Team	+ 0"
6	Matteo Trentin (ITA)	UAE Team Emirates	+ 0"
7	Cees Bol (NED)	Team DSM	+ 0"
8	Michael Matthews (AUS)	Team BikeExchange–Jayco	+ 0"
9	Mike Teunissen (NED)	Team Jumbo–Visma	+ 0"
10	Alberto Bettiol (ITA)	EF Education–EasyPost	+ 0"

General classification after Stage 3
Rank	Rider	Team	Time
1	Stephen Williams (GBR)	Team Bahrain Victorious	13h 32' 19"
2	Andreas Kron (DEN)	Lotto–Soudal	+ 6"
3	Andreas Leknessund (NOR)	Team DSM	+ 7"
4	Geraint Thomas (GBR)	Ineos Grenadiers	+ 7"
5	Stefan Küng (SUI)	Groupama–FDJ	+ 10"
6	Sepp Kuss (USA)	Team Jumbo–Visma	+ 10"
7	Marc Hirschi (SUI)	UAE Team Emirates	+ 10"
8	Jakob Fuglsang (DEN)	Israel–Premier Tech	+ 10"
9	Aleksandr Vlasov^{[a]}	Bora–Hansgrohe	+ 10"
10	Adam Yates (GBR)	Ineos Grenadiers	+ 10"

=== Stage 4 ===
15 June 2022 — Grenchen to Brunnen, 191 km (119 mi)

Stage 4 Result
Rank	Rider	Team	Time
1	Daryl Impey (RSA)	Israel–Premier Tech	4h 14' 09"
2	Michael Matthews (AUS)	Team BikeExchange–Jayco	+ 0"
3	Søren Kragh Andersen (DEN)	Team DSM	+ 0"
4	Alberto Bettiol (ITA)	EF Education–EasyPost	+ 0"
5	Tom Pidcock (GBR)	Ineos Grenadiers	+ 0"
6	Alex Aranburu (ESP)	Movistar Team	+ 0"
7	Felix Großschartner (AUT)	Bora–Hansgrohe	+ 0"
8	Gianluca Brambilla (ITA)	Trek–Segafredo	+ 0"
9	Mathieu Burgaudeau (FRA)	Team TotalEnergies	+ 0"
10	Stefan Küng (SUI)	Groupama–FDJ	+ 0"

General classification after Stage 4
Rank	Rider	Team	Time
1	Stephen Williams (GBR)	Team Bahrain Victorious	17h 46' 28"
2	Andreas Kron (DEN)	Lotto–Soudal	+ 6"
3	Geraint Thomas (GBR)	Ineos Grenadiers	+ 7"
4	Andreas Leknessund (NOR)	Team DSM	+ 7"
5	Stefan Küng (SUI)	Groupama–FDJ	+ 10"
6	Marc Hirschi (SUI)	UAE Team Emirates	+ 10"
7	Sepp Kuss (USA)	Team Jumbo–Visma	+ 10"
8	Jakob Fuglsang (DEN)	Israel–Premier Tech	+ 10"
9	Aleksandr Vlasov^{[a]}	Bora–Hansgrohe	+ 10"
10	Adam Yates (GBR)	Ineos Grenadiers	+ 10"

=== Stage 5 ===
16 June 2022 — Ambrì to Novazzano, 193 km (120 mi), 177 km (110 mi)

Stage 5 Result
Rank	Rider	Team	Time
1	Aleksandr Vlasov^{[a]}	Bora–Hansgrohe	4h 30' 28"
2	Neilson Powless (USA)	EF Education–EasyPost	+ 0"
3	Jakob Fuglsang (DEN)	Israel–Premier Tech	+ 0"
4	Geraint Thomas (GBR)	Ineos Grenadiers	+ 0"
5	Diego Ulissi (ITA)	UAE Team Emirates	+ 5"
6	Felix Großschartner (AUT)	Bora–Hansgrohe	+ 6"
7	Stefan Küng (SUI)	Groupama–FDJ	+ 6"
8	Sergio Higuita (COL)	Bora–Hansgrohe	+ 6"
9	Maximilian Schachmann (GER)	Bora–Hansgrohe	+ 6"
10	Sebastien Reichenbach (SUI)	Groupama–FDJ	+ 9"

General classification after Stage 5
Rank	Rider	Team	Time
1	Aleksandr Vlasov^{[a]}	Bora–Hansgrohe	22h 16' 56"
2	Jakob Fuglsang (DEN)	Israel–Premier Tech	+ 6"
3	Geraint Thomas (GBR)	Ineos Grenadiers	+ 7"
4	Andreas Kron (DEN)	Lotto–Soudal	+ 14"
5	Stefan Küng (SUI)	Groupama–FDJ	+ 16"
6	Sergio Higuita (COL)	Bora–Hansgrohe	+ 16"
7	Neilson Powless (USA)	EF Education–EasyPost	+ 28"
8	Felix Großschartner (AUT)	Bora–Hansgrohe	+ 40"
9	Sebastien Reichenbach (SUI)	Groupama–FDJ	+ 43"
10	Andreas Leknessund (NOR)	Team DSM	+ 44"

=== Stage 6 ===
17 June 2022 — Locarno to Moosalp, 180 km (110 mi), 120.2 km (74.7 mi)

The leader Alexandr Vlasov and several other riders did not start, as a result of a positive COVID-19 test.

Stage 6 Result
Rank	Rider	Team	Time
1	Nico Denz (GER)	Team DSM	5h 11' 14"
2	Clément Champoussin (FRA)	AG2R Citroën Team	+ 0"
3	Jose Herrada (ESP)	Cofidis	+ 0"
3	Quinn Simmons (USA)	Trek–Segafredo	+ 0"
5	Fausto Masnada (ITA)	Quick-Step Alpha Vinyl Team	+ 11"
6	Quentin Pacher (FRA)	Groupama–FDJ	+ 1' 33"
7	Roland Thalmann (SUI)	Switzerland	+ 1' 46"
8	Geraint Thomas (GBR)	Ineos Grenadiers	+ 2' 14"
9	Sergio Higuita (COL)	Bora–Hansgrohe	+ 2' 14"
10	Jakob Fuglsang (DEN)	Israel–Premier Tech	+ 2' 14"

General classification after Stage 6
Rank	Rider	Team	Time
1	Jakob Fuglsang (DEN)	Israel–Premier Tech	27h 30 30"
2	Geraint Thomas (GBR)	Ineos Grenadiers	+ 1"
3	Sergio Higuita (COL)	Bora–Hansgrohe	+ 10"
4	Neilson Powless (USA)	EF Education–EasyPost	+ 26"
5	Felix Großschartner (AUT)	Bora–Hansgrohe	+ 34"
6	Andreas Leknessund (NOR)	Team DSM	+ 46"
7	Stefan Küng (SUI)	Groupama–FDJ	+ 49"
8	Andreas Kron (DEN)	Lotto–Soudal	+ 1' 00"
9	Domenico Pozzovivo (ITA)	Intermarché–Wanty–Gobert Matériaux	+ 1' 07"
10	Sebastien Reichenbach (SUI)	Groupama–FDJ	+ 1' 29"

=== Stage 7 ===
18 June 2022 — Ambrì to Malbun (Liechtenstein), 196 km (122 mi)

Stage 7 Result
Rank	Rider	Team	Time
1	Thibaut Pinot (FRA)	Groupama–FDJ	5h 06' 39"
2	Oscar Rodríguez (ESP)	Movistar Team	+ 25"
3	Alexey Lutsenko (KAZ)	Astana Qazaqstan Team	+ 38"
4	Sergio Higuita (COL)	Bora–Hansgrohe	+ 1' 19"
5	Geraint Thomas (GBR)	Ineos Grenadiers	+ 1' 30"
6	Nicolas Prodhomme (FRA)	AG2R Citroën Team	+ 1' 40"
7	Jakob Fuglsang (DEN)	Israel–Premier Tech	+ 1' 48"
8	Domenico Pozzovivo (ITA)	Intermarché–Wanty–Gobert Matériaux	+ 1' 59"
9	Sebastien Reichenbach (SUI)	Groupama–FDJ	+ 2' 09"
10	Neilson Powless (USA)	EF Education–EasyPost	+ 2' 19"

General classification after Stage 7
Rank	Rider	Team	Time
1	Sergio Higuita (COL)	Bora–Hansgrohe	32h 38' 38"
2	Geraint Thomas (GBR)	Ineos Grenadiers	+ 2"
3	Jakob Fuglsang (DEN)	Israel–Premier Tech	+ 19"
4	Neilson Powless (USA)	EF Education–EasyPost	+ 1' 16"
5	Domenico Pozzovivo (ITA)	Intermarché–Wanty–Gobert Matériaux	+ 1' 37"
6	Sebastien Reichenbach (SUI)	Groupama–FDJ	+ 2' 09"
7	Stefan Küng (SUI)	Groupama–FDJ	+ 2' 19"
8	Bob Jungels (LUX)	AG2R Citroën Team	+ 2' 31"
9	Felix Großschartner (AUT)	Bora–Hansgrohe	+ 2' 47"
10	Andreas Leknessund (NOR)	Team DSM	+ 2' 59"

=== Stage 8 ===
19 June 2022 — Vaduz (Liechtenstein) to Vaduz (Liechtenstein), 25.6 km (15.9 mi) (ITT)

Stage 8 Result
Rank	Rider	Team	Time
1	Remco Evenepoel (BEL)	Quick-Step Alpha Vinyl Team	28h'26"
2	Geraint Thomas (GBR)	Ineos Grenadiers	+ 3"
3	Stefan Küng (SUI)	Groupama–FDJ	+ 11"
4	Daniel Martínez (COL)	Ineos Grenadiers	+ 28"
5	Bob Jungels (LUX)	AG2R Citroën Team	+ 33"
6	Maximilian Schachmann (GER)	Bora–Hansgrohe	+ 39"
7	Felix Großschartner (AUT)	Bora–Hansgrohe	+ 55"
8	Neilson Powless (USA)	EF Education–EasyPost	+ 59"
9	Jakob Fuglsang (DEN)	Israel–Premier Tech	+ 1' 02"
10	Dylan van Baarle (NED)	Ineos Grenadiers	+ 1' 05"

General classification after Stage 8
Rank	Rider	Team	Time
1	Geraint Thomas (GBR)	Ineos Grenadiers	33h 37' 09"
2	Sergio Higuita (COL)	Bora–Hansgrohe	+ 1' 12"
3	Jakob Fuglsang (DEN)	Israel–Premier Tech	+ 1' 16"
4	Neilson Powless (USA)	EF Education–EasyPost	+ 2' 10"
5	Stefan Küng (SUI)	Groupama–FDJ	+ 2' 25"
6	Bob Jungels (LUX)	AG2R Citroën Team	+ 2' 59"
7	Felix Großschartner (AUT)	Bora–Hansgrohe	+ 3' 37"
8	Daniel Martínez (COL)	Ineos Grenadiers	+ 3' 39"
9	Domenico Pozzovivo (ITA)	Intermarché–Wanty–Gobert Matériaux	+ 3' 42"
10	Maximilian Schachmann (GER)	Bora–Hansgrohe	+ 3' 45"

== Classification leadership table ==
Classification leadership by stage
Stage	Winner	General classification	Sprints classification	Mountains classification	Young rider classification	Team classification	Most active rider award
1	Stephen Williams	Stephen Williams	Stephen Williams	Quinn Simmons	Andreas Kron	Bora–Hansgrohe	
2	Andreas Leknessund	Stephen Williams	Andreas Leknessund	Quinn Simmons	Andreas Kron	Bora–Hansgrohe	
3	Peter Sagan	Stephen Williams	Andreas Leknessund	Quinn Simmons	Andreas Kron	Bora–Hansgrohe	
4	Daryl Impey	Stephen Williams	Andreas Leknessund	Quinn Simmons	Andreas Kron	Bora–Hansgrohe	
5	Aleksandr Vlasov	Aleksandr Vlasov	Andreas Leknessund	Quinn Simmons	Andreas Kron	Bora–Hansgrohe	
6	Nico Denz	Jakob Fuglsang	Michael Matthews	Quinn Simmons	Sergio Higuita	Bora–Hansgrohe	
7	Thibaut Pinot	Sergio Higuita	Michael Matthews	Quinn Simmons	Sergio Higuita	Groupama–FDJ	
8	Remco Evenepoel	Geraint Thomas	Michael Matthews	Quinn Simmons	Sergio Higuita	Bora–Hansgrohe	
Final		Geraint Thomas	Michael Matthews	Quinn Simmons	Sergio Higuita	Bora–Hansgrohe	

== Classification standings ==
Legend
Denotes the leader of the general classification	Denotes the leader of the young rider classification
Denotes the leader of the points classification	Denotes the leader of the team classification
Denotes the leader of the mountains classification	

=== General classification ===
Final general classification (1–10)
Rank	Rider	Team	Time
1	Geraint Thomas (GBR)	Ineos Grenadiers	33h 07' 09"
2	Sergio Higuita (COL)	Bora–Hansgrohe	+ 1' 12"
3	Jakob Fuglsang (DEN)	Israel–Premier Tech	+ 1' 16"
4	Neilson Powless (USA)	EF Education–EasyPost	+ 2' 10"
5	Stefan Küng (SUI)	Groupama–FDJ	+ 2' 25"
6	Bob Jungels (LUX)	AG2R Citroën Team	+ 2' 59"
7	Felix Großschartner (AUT)	Bora–Hansgrohe	+ 3' 37"
8	Daniel Martínez (COL)	Ineos Grenadiers	+ 3' 39"
9	Domenico Pozzovivo (ITA)	Intermarché–Wanty–Gobert Matériaux	+ 3' 42"
10	Maximilian Schachmann (GER)	Bora–Hansgrohe	+ 3' 45"

=== Points classification ===
Final points classification (1–10)
Rank	Rider	Team	Points
1	Michael Matthews (AUS)	Team BikeExchange–Jayco	30
2	Andreas Leknessund (NOR)	Team DSM	20
3	Quinn Simmons (USA)	Trek–Segafredo	18
4	Geraint Thomas (GBR)	Ineos Grenadiers	18
5	Thibaut Pinot (FRA)	Groupama–FDJ	13
6	Remco Evenepoel (BEL)	Quick-Step Alpha Vinyl Team	12
7	Nico Denz (GER)	Team DSM	12
8	Matthew Holmes (GBR)	Lotto–Soudal	12
9	Maximilian Schachmann (GER)	Bora–Hansgrohe	10
10	Clément Champoussin (FRA)	AG2R Citroën Team	9

=== Mountains classification ===
Final mountains classification (1–10)
Rank	Rider	Team	Points
1	Quinn Simmons (USA)	Trek–Segafredo	60
2	Fausto Masnada (ITA)	Quick-Step Alpha Vinyl Team	31
3	Thibaut Pinot (FRA)	Groupama–FDJ	28
4	Nico Denz (GER)	Team DSM	20
5	Óscar Rodríguez (ESP)	Movistar Team	16
6	Clément Champoussin (FRA)	AG2R Citroën Team	15
7	Clément Berthet (FRA)	AG2R Citroën Team	14
8	Philippe Gilbert (BEL)	Lotto–Soudal	12
9	Andreas Leknessund (NOR)	Team DSM	10
10	Alexander Kamp (DEN)	Trek–Segafredo	10

=== Young rider classification ===
Final young rider classification (1–10)
Rank	Rider	Team	Time
1	Sergio Higuita (COL)	Bora–Hansgrohe	33h 08' 21"
2	Remco Evenepoel (BEL)	Quick-Step Alpha Vinyl Team	+ 2' 52"
3	Andreas Leknessund (NOR)	Team DSM	+ 3' 14"
4	Andreas Kron (DEN)	Lotto–Soudal	+ 5' 55"
5	Mathieu Burgaudeau (FRA)	Team TotalEnergies	+ 7' 25"
6	Clément Berthet (FRA)	AG2R Citroën Team	+ 19' 40"
7	Clément Champoussin (FRA)	AG2R Citroën Team	+ 30' 03"
8	Sylvain Moniquet (BEL)	Lotto–Soudal	+ 39' 23"
9	Yannis Voisard (SUI)	Switzerland	+ 44' 45"
10	Nicolas Prodhomme (FRA)	AG2R Citroën Team	+ 48' 19"

=== Team classification ===
Final team classification (1–10)
Rank	Team	Time
1	(Germany) Bora–Hansgrohe	99h 28' 46"
2	(France) Groupama–FDJ	+ 1' 07"
3	(France) AG2R Citroën Team	+ 17' 22"
4	(United Kingdom) Ineos Grenadiers	+ 31' 30"
5	(Belgium) Quick-Step Alpha Vinyl Team	+ 38' 35"
6	Israel–Premier Tech	+ 39' 22"
7	(Spain) Movistar Team	+ 42' 09"
8	(France) Cofidis	+ 1h 03' 34"
9	(Belgium) Lotto–Soudal	+ 1h 18' 05"
10	(Netherlands) Team DSM	+ 1h 27' 56"

== Notes ==
^{a} As of 1 March 2022, the UCI announced that cyclists from Russia and Belarus would no longer compete under the name or flag of those respective countries due to the Russian invasion of Ukraine.
