= Edoardo Zambanini =

Italian cyclist

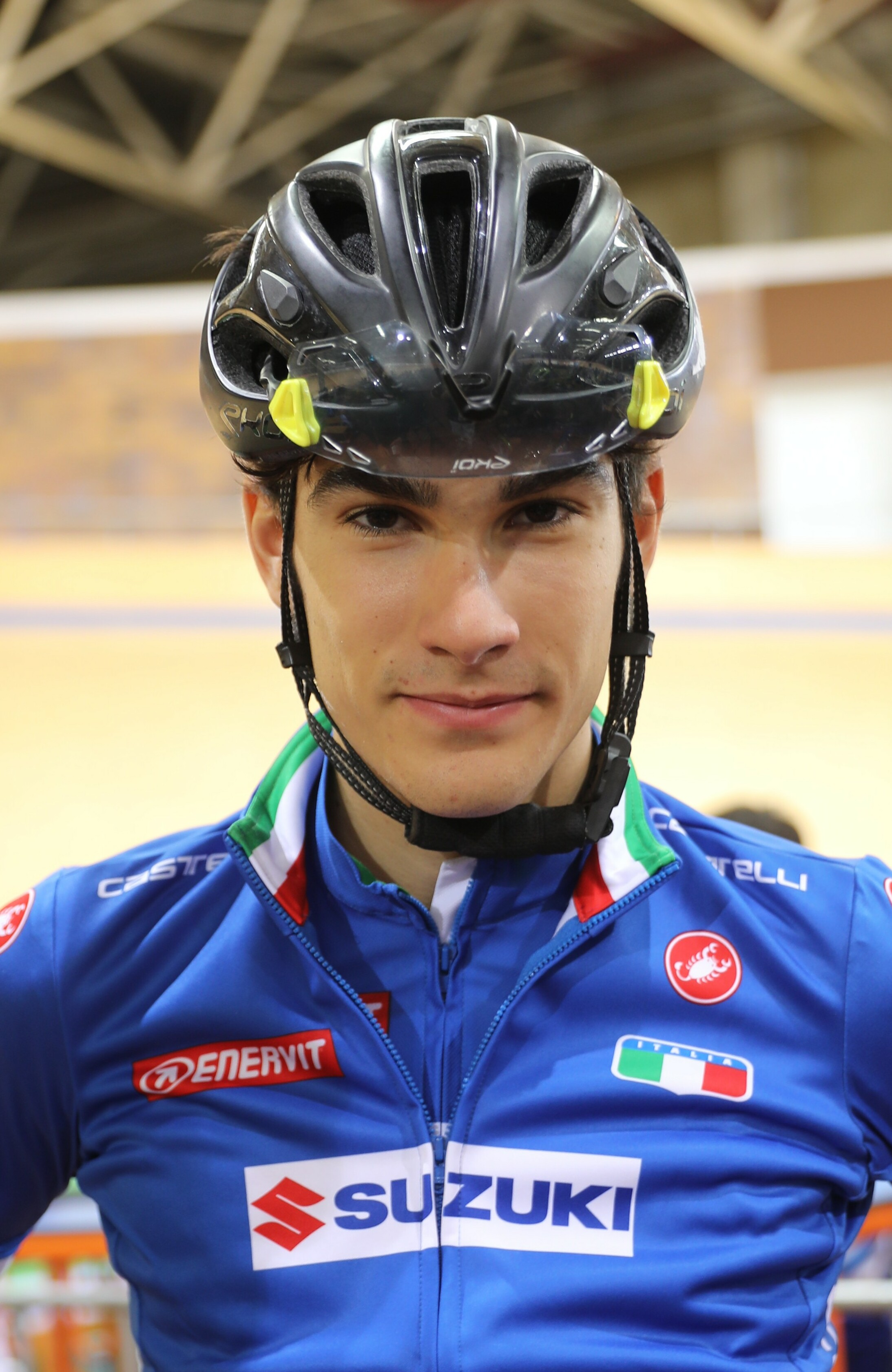
- Zambanini in 2019

Personal information
- Born: 21 April 2001 (age 25) Riva del Garda, Italy
- Height: 1.80 m (5 ft 11 in)
- Weight: 62 kg (137 lb)

Cycling career
- Sport: Cycling
- Current team: Team Bahrain Victorious
- Discipline: Road
- Role: Rider
- Rider type: Climber

Amateur teams
- 2008–2017: Ciclistica Dro
- 2018–2019: Team Campana Imballaggi
- 2020: Zalf–Euromobil–Désirée–Fior

Professional teams
- 2021: Zalf Euromobil Fior
- 2022–: Team Bahrain Victorious

Edoardo Zambanini (born 21 April 2001) is an Italian cyclist, who currently rides for UCI WorldTeam Team Bahrain Victorious.

He initially competed in track cycling before switching to the road to become a climbing specialist.

== Major results ==
2018
7th Trofeo Buffoni
2019
2nd G.P. Sportivi Sovilla-La Piccola Sanremo
10th Road race, UEC European Junior Road Championships
2020
8th Trofeo Città di San Vendemiano
10th Overall Giro Ciclistico d'Italia

1st Young rider classification

2021
6th Ruota d'Oro
8th Gran Premio Sportivi di Poggiana
9th Giro del Medio Brenta
2022
4th Overall Tour de Hongrie
4th Gran Piemonte
2024
3rd Road race, National Road Championships
3rd Overall Tour of Antalya
4th Overall CRO Race
7th Overall Tour de Pologne
7th Overall Tour of Britain
9th Grand Prix Cycliste de Montréal
9th Gran Piemonte
10th Grand Prix Cycliste de Québec
10th Japan Cup
2025
2nd Overall CRO Race
6th Gran Piemonte
2026
10th Milan–San Remo

=== Grand Tour general classification results timeline ===
Grand Tour	2022	2023	2024	2025
Giro d'Italia	—	40	27	27
Tour de France	—	—	—	—
Vuelta a España	36	—	—	—

Legend
—	Did not compete
DNF	Did not finish
