= 2024 Gran Piemonte =

2024 UCI ProSeries

Race details
- Dates: 10 October 2024
- Stages: 1
- Distance: 182 km (113.1 mi)
- Winning time: 3h 57' 36"

Results
	Winner	Neilson Powless (USA)	(EF Education–EasyPost)
	Second	Corbin Strong (NZL)	(Israel–Premier Tech)
	Third	Alex Aranburu (ESP)	(Movistar Team)

The 2024 Gran Piemonte was the 108th edition of the Gran Piemonte road cycling one day race, which was held on 10 October 2024 as part of the 2024 UCI ProSeries calendar.

== Teams ==
Fourteen UCI WorldTeams and nine UCI ProTeams made up the twenty-three teams that participated in the race.

UCI WorldTeams

- Alpecin–Deceuninck
- Arkéa–B&B Hotels
- Astana Qazaqstan Team
- Cofidis
- EF Education–EasyPost
- Ineos Grenadiers
- Intermarché–Wanty
- Lidl–Trek
- Movistar Team
- Red Bull–Bora–Hansgrohe
- Team Bahrain Victorious
- Team dsm–firmenich PostNL
- Team Jayco–AlUla
- UAE Team Emirates

UCI ProTeams

- Bingoal WB
- Israel–Premier Tech
- Lotto–Dstny
- Polti–Kometa
- Q36.5 Pro Cycling Team
- Team Corratec–Vini Fantini
- Tudor Pro Cycling Team
- Uno-X Mobility
- VF Group–Bardiani–CSF–Faizanè

== Results ==
Result
Rank	Rider	Team	Time
1	Neilson Powless (USA)	EF Education–EasyPost	3h 57' 36"
2	Corbin Strong (NZL)	Israel–Premier Tech	+ 7"
3	Alex Aranburu (ESP)	Movistar Team	+ 7"
4	Filippo Magli (ITA)	VF Group–Bardiani–CSF–Faizanè	+ 7"
5	Xandro Meurisse (BEL)	Alpecin–Deceuninck	+ 7"
6	Tobias Halland Johannessen (NOR)	Uno-X Mobility	+ 7"
7	Natnael Tesfatsion (ERI)	Lidl–Trek	+ 7"
8	Francesco Busatto (ITA)	Intermarché–Wanty	+ 7"
9	Edoardo Zambanini (ITA)	Team Bahrain Victorious	+ 7"
10	Matej Mohorič (SLO)	Team Bahrain Victorious	+ 7"
