= 2023 Clásica de San Sebastián =

2023 UCI World Tour, race 26 of 35

Race details
- Dates: 29 July 2023
- Stages: 1
- Distance: 230.3 km (143.1 mi)
- Winning time: 5h 30' 59"

Results
	Winner	Remco Evenepoel (BEL)	(Soudal–Quick-Step)
	Second	Pello Bilbao (ESP)	(Team Bahrain Victorious)
	Third	Aleksandr Vlasov	(Bora–Hansgrohe)

The 2023 Clásica de San Sebastián was a road cycling one-day race took place on 29 July 2023 in San Sebastián, Spain. It was the 42nd edition of the Clásica de San Sebastián and the 26th event of the 2023 UCI World Tour.

== Teams ==
All the 18 UCI WorldTeams and seven UCI ProTeams make up the twenty-five teams that will participate in the race.

UCI WorldTeams

- AG2R Citroën Team
- Alpecin–Deceuninck
- Arkéa–Samsic
- Astana Qazaqstan Team
- Bora–Hansgrohe
- Cofidis
- EF Education–EasyPost
- Groupama–FDJ
- INEOS Grenadiers
- Intermarché–Circus–Wanty
- Lidl–Trek
- Movistar Team
- Soudal–Quick-Step
- Team dsm–firmenich
- Team Bahrain Victorious
- Team Jayco–AlUla
- Team Jumbo–Visma
- UAE Team Emirates

UCI Professional Continental Teams

- Burgos BH
- Caja Rural–Seguros RGA
- Equipo Kern Pharma
- Euskaltel–Euskadi
- Israel–Premier Tech
- Lotto–Dstny
- Team TotalEnergies

== Result ==
Result
Rank	Rider	Team	Time
1	Remco Evenepoel (BEL)	Soudal–Quick-Step	5h 30' 59"
2	Pello Bilbao (ESP)	Team Bahrain Victorious	+ 0"
3	Aleksandr Vlasov	Bora–Hansgrohe	+ 28"
4	Neilson Powless (USA)	EF Education–EasyPost	+ 2' 50"
5	Ion Izagirre (ESP)	Cofidis	+ 2' 57"
6	Toms Skujiņš (LAT)	Lidl–Trek	+ 3' 02"
7	Alex Aranburu (ESP)	Movistar Team	+ 3' 02"
8	Rui Costa (POR)	Intermarché–Circus–Wanty	+ 3' 02"
9	Andrea Bagioli (ITA)	Soudal–Quick-Step	+ 3' 02"
10	Tiesj Benoot (BEL)	Team Jumbo–Visma	+ 3' 02"
