= 2021 Tour de Romandie =

2021 UCI World Tour, race 17 of 29

Race details
- Dates: 27 April – 2 May 2021
- Stages: 5 + Prologue
- Distance: 684.04 km (425.04 mi)
- Winning time: 17h 59' 57"

Results
Jersey awarded to the overall winner	Winner	Geraint Thomas (GBR)	(INEOS Grenadiers)
	Second	Richie Porte (AUS)	(INEOS Grenadiers)
	Third	Fausto Masnada (ITA)	(Deceuninck–Quick-Step)
Jersey awarded to the points classification winner	Points	Sonny Colbrelli (ITA)	(Team Bahrain Victorious)
Jersey awarded to the mountains classification winner	Mountains	Kobe Goossens (BEL)	(Lotto–Soudal)
Jersey awarded to the young rider classification winner	Young rider	Thymen Arensman (NED)	(Team DSM)
Jersey awarded to the combativity classification winner	Combativity	Kobe Goossens (BEL)	(Lotto–Soudal)
	Team	(United Kingdom) INEOS Grenadiers	

The 2021 Tour de Romandie was a road cycling stage race, that took place between 27 April and 2 May 2021 in Romandy, the French-speaking part of western Switzerland. It was the 74th edition of the Tour de Romandie and the 17th race of the 2021 UCI World Tour.

== Teams ==
All nineteen UCI WorldTeams and the Swiss national team participated in the race. Each of the 20 teams entered seven riders, for a total of 140 riders, of which 120 finished.

UCI WorldTeams

- AG2R Citroën Team
- Astana–Premier Tech
- Bora–Hansgrohe
- Cofidis
- Deceuninck–Quick-Step
- EF Education–Nippo
- Groupama–FDJ
- INEOS Grenadiers
- Intermarché–Wanty–Gobert Matériaux
- Israel Start-Up Nation
- Lotto–Soudal
- Movistar Team
- Team Bahrain Victorious
- Team BikeExchange
- Team DSM
- Team Jumbo–Visma
- Team Qhubeka Assos
- Trek–Segafredo
- UAE Team Emirates

National Teams

- Switzerland

== Route ==
Stage characteristics and winners
Stage	Date	Route	Distance	Type	Winner
P	27 April	Oron	4.05 km (2.52 mi)	Individual time trial	Rohan Dennis (AUS)
1	28 April	Aigle to Martigny	168.1 km (104.5 mi)	Hilly stage	Peter Sagan (SVK)
2	29 April	La Neuveville to Saint-Imier	165.7 km (103.0 mi)	Mountain stage	Sonny Colbrelli (ITA)
3	30 April	Estavayer to Estavayer	168.7 km (104.8 mi)	Hilly stage	Marc Soler (ESP)
4	1 May	Sion to Thyon 2000	161.3 km (100.2 mi)	Mountain stage	Michael Woods (CAN)
5	2 May	Fribourg to Fribourg	16.19 km (10.06 mi)	Individual time trial	Rémi Cavagna (FRA)
Total			684.04 km (425.04 mi)		

== Stages ==
=== Prologue ===
27 April 2021 — Oron, 4.05 kilometres (2.52 mi) (ITT)

Prologue result
Rank	Rider	Team	Time
1	Rohan Dennis (AUS)	INEOS Grenadiers	5' 26"
2	Geraint Thomas (GBR)	INEOS Grenadiers	+ 9"
3	Richie Porte (AUS)	INEOS Grenadiers	+ 9"
4	Rémi Cavagna (FRA)	Deceuninck–Quick-Step	+ 11"
5	Stefan Bissegger (SUI)	EF Education–Nippo	+ 11"
6	Jan Tratnik (SLO)	Team Bahrain Victorious	+ 13"
7	Jesús Herrada (ESP)	Cofidis	+ 14"
8	Marc Hirschi (SUI)	UAE Team Emirates	+ 15"
9	Filippo Ganna (ITA)	INEOS Grenadiers	+ 15"
10	Mattia Cattaneo (ITA)	Deceuninck–Quick-Step	+ 15"

General classification after prologue
Rank	Rider	Team	Time
1	Rohan Dennis (AUS)	INEOS Grenadiers	5' 26"
2	Geraint Thomas (GBR)	INEOS Grenadiers	+ 9"
3	Richie Porte (AUS)	INEOS Grenadiers	+ 9"
4	Rémi Cavagna (FRA)	Deceuninck–Quick-Step	+ 11"
5	Stefan Bissegger (SUI)	EF Education–Nippo	+ 11"
6	Jan Tratnik (SLO)	Team Bahrain Victorious	+ 13"
7	Jesús Herrada (ESP)	Cofidis	+ 14"
8	Marc Hirschi (SUI)	UAE Team Emirates	+ 15"
9	Filippo Ganna (ITA)	INEOS Grenadiers	+ 15"
10	Mattia Cattaneo (ITA)	Deceuninck–Quick-Step	+ 15"

=== Stage 1 ===
28 April 2021 — Aigle to Martigny, 168.1 kilometres (104.5 mi)

Stage 1 result
Rank	Rider	Team	Time
1	Peter Sagan (SVK)	Bora–Hansgrohe	4h 12' 40"
2	Sonny Colbrelli (ITA)	Team Bahrain Victorious	+ 0"
3	Patrick Bevin (NZL)	Israel Start-Up Nation	+ 0"
4	Andrea Pasqualon (ITA)	Intermarché–Wanty–Gobert Matériaux	+ 0"
5	Alessandro Covi (ITA)	UAE Team Emirates	+ 0"
6	Magnus Cort (DEN)	EF Education–Nippo	+ 0"
7	Dion Smith (NZL)	Team BikeExchange	+ 0"
8	Clément Venturini (FRA)	AG2R Citroën Team	+ 0"
9	Mattia Cattaneo (ITA)	Deceuninck–Quick-Step	+ 0"
10	Jacopo Mosca (ITA)	Trek–Segafredo	+ 0"

General classification after stage 1
Rank	Rider	Team	Time
1	Rohan Dennis (AUS)	INEOS Grenadiers	4h 18' 06"
2	Geraint Thomas (GBR)	INEOS Grenadiers	+ 9"
3	Richie Porte (AUS)	INEOS Grenadiers	+ 9"
4	Rémi Cavagna (FRA)	Deceuninck–Quick-Step	+ 11"
5	Peter Sagan (SVK)	Bora–Hansgrohe	+ 12"
6	Jan Tratnik (SLO)	Team Bahrain Victorious	+ 13"
7	Patrick Bevin (NZL)	Israel Start-Up Nation	+ 14"
8	Jesús Herrada (ESP)	Cofidis	+ 14"
9	Marc Hirschi (SUI)	UAE Team Emirates	+ 15"
10	Mattia Cattaneo (ITA)	Deceuninck–Quick-Step	+ 15"

=== Stage 2 ===
29 April 2021 — La Neuveville to Saint-Imier, 165.7 kilometres (103.0 mi)

Stage 2 result
Rank	Rider	Team	Time
1	Sonny Colbrelli (ITA)	Team Bahrain Victorious	4h 21' 42"
2	Patrick Bevin (NZL)	Israel Start-Up Nation	+ 0"
3	Marc Hirschi (SUI)	UAE Team Emirates	+ 0"
4	Clément Champoussin (FRA)	AG2R Citroën Team	+ 0"
5	Diego Ulissi (ITA)	UAE Team Emirates	+ 0"
6	Wilco Kelderman (NED)	Bora–Hansgrohe	+ 0"
7	Ilan Van Wilder (BEL)	Team DSM	+ 0"
8	Fausto Masnada (ITA)	Deceuninck–Quick-Step	+ 0"
9	Rui Costa (POR)	UAE Team Emirates	+ 0"
10	Marc Soler (ESP)	Movistar Team	+ 0"

General classification after stage 2
Rank	Rider	Team	Time
1	Rohan Dennis (AUS)	INEOS Grenadiers	8h 39' 48"
2	Patrick Bevin (NZL)	Israel Start-Up Nation	+ 8"
3	Geraint Thomas (GBR)	INEOS Grenadiers	+ 9"
4	Richie Porte (AUS)	INEOS Grenadiers	+ 9"
5	Sonny Colbrelli (ITA)	Team Bahrain Victorious	+ 9"
6	Marc Hirschi (SUI)	UAE Team Emirates	+ 11"
7	Jesús Herrada (ESP)	Cofidis	+ 14"
8	Mattia Cattaneo (ITA)	Deceuninck–Quick-Step	+ 15"
9	Wilco Kelderman (NED)	Bora–Hansgrohe	+ 16"
10	Ilan Van Wilder (BEL)	Team DSM	+ 16"

=== Stage 3 ===
30 April 2021 — Estavayer to Estavayer, 168.7 kilometres (104.8 mi)

Stage 3 result
Rank	Rider	Team	Time
1	Marc Soler (ESP)	Movistar Team	3h 58' 35"
2	Magnus Cort (DEN)	EF Education–Nippo	+ 22"
3	Peter Sagan (SVK)	Bora–Hansgrohe	+ 22"
4	Sonny Colbrelli (ITA)	Team Bahrain Victorious	+ 22"
5	Gorka Izagirre (ESP)	Astana–Premier Tech	+ 22"
6	Diego Ulissi (ITA)	UAE Team Emirates	+ 22"
7	Ilan Van Wilder (BEL)	Team DSM	+ 22"
8	Sepp Kuss (USA)	Team Jumbo–Visma	+ 22"
9	Ion Izagirre (ESP)	Astana–Premier Tech	+ 22"
10	Rui Costa (POR)	UAE Team Emirates	+ 22"

General classification after stage 3
Rank	Rider	Team	Time
1	Marc Soler (ESP)	Movistar Team	12h 38' 40"
2	Geraint Thomas (GBR)	INEOS Grenadiers	+ 14"
3	Richie Porte (AUS)	INEOS Grenadiers	+ 14"
4	Sonny Colbrelli (ITA)	Team Bahrain Victorious	+ 14"
5	Marc Hirschi (SUI)	UAE Team Emirates	+ 16"
6	Mattia Cattaneo (ITA)	Deceuninck–Quick-Step	+ 20"
7	Wilco Kelderman (NED)	Bora–Hansgrohe	+ 21"
8	Ilan Van Wilder (BEL)	Team DSM	+ 21"
9	Sepp Kuss (USA)	Team Jumbo–Visma	+ 21"
10	Rui Costa (POR)	UAE Team Emirates	+ 24"

=== Stage 4 ===
1 May 2021 — Sion to Thyon 2000, 161.3 kilometres (100.2 mi)

Stage 4 result
Rank	Rider	Team	Time
1	Michael Woods (CAN)	Israel Start-Up Nation	4h 58' 35"
2	Ben O'Connor (AUS)	AG2R Citroën Team	+ 17"
3	Geraint Thomas (GBR)	INEOS Grenadiers	+ 21"
4	Lucas Hamilton (AUS)	Team BikeExchange	+ 34"
5	Fausto Masnada (ITA)	Deceuninck–Quick-Step	+ 37"
6	Richie Porte (AUS)	INEOS Grenadiers	+ 42"
7	Ion Izagirre (ESP)	Astana–Premier Tech	+ 42"
8	Damiano Caruso (ITA)	Team Bahrain Victorious	+ 52"
9	Marc Soler (ESP)	Movistar Team	+ 53"
10	Thymen Arensman (NED)	Team DSM	+ 1' 57"

General classification after stage 4
Rank	Rider	Team	Time
1	Michael Woods (CAN)	Israel Start-Up Nation	17h 37' 35"
2	Geraint Thomas (GBR)	INEOS Grenadiers	+ 11"
3	Ben O'Connor (AUS)	AG2R Citroën Team	+ 21"
4	Marc Soler (ESP)	Movistar Team	+ 33"
5	Richie Porte (AUS)	INEOS Grenadiers	+ 36"
6	Fausto Masnada (ITA)	Deceuninck–Quick-Step	+ 45"
7	Ion Izagirre (ESP)	Astana–Premier Tech	+ 48"
8	Lucas Hamilton (AUS)	Team BikeExchange	+ 49"
9	Damiano Caruso (ITA)	Team Bahrain Victorious	+ 1' 04"
10	Wilco Kelderman (NED)	Bora–Hansgrohe	+ 1' 58"

=== Stage 5 ===
2 May 2021 — Fribourg to Fribourg, 16.19 kilometres (10.06 mi) (ITT)

Stage 5 result
Rank	Rider	Team	Time
1	Rémi Cavagna (FRA)	Deceuninck–Quick-Step	21' 54"
2	Stefan Bissegger (SUI)	EF Education–Nippo	+ 6"
3	Geraint Thomas (GBR)	INEOS Grenadiers	+ 17"
4	Ilan Van Wilder (BEL)	Team DSM	+ 18"
5	Richie Porte (AUS)	INEOS Grenadiers	+ 20"
6	Fausto Masnada (ITA)	Deceuninck–Quick-Step	+ 21"
7	Mattia Cattaneo (ITA)	Deceuninck–Quick-Step	+ 29"
8	Marc Soler (ESP)	Movistar Team	+ 34"
9	Rohan Dennis (AUS)	INEOS Grenadiers	+ 35"
10	Filippo Ganna (ITA)	INEOS Grenadiers	+ 37"

General classification after stage 5
Rank	Rider	Team	Time
1	Geraint Thomas (GBR)	INEOS Grenadiers	17h 59' 57"
2	Richie Porte (AUS)	INEOS Grenadiers	+ 28"
3	Fausto Masnada (ITA)	Deceuninck–Quick-Step	+ 38"
4	Marc Soler (ESP)	Movistar Team	+ 39"
5	Michael Woods (CAN)	Israel Start-Up Nation	+ 43"
6	Ben O'Connor (AUS)	AG2R Citroën Team	+ 45"
7	Ion Izagirre (ESP)	Astana–Premier Tech	+ 1' 08"
8	Lucas Hamilton (AUS)	Team BikeExchange	+ 1' 22"
9	Damiano Caruso (ITA)	Team Bahrain Victorious	+ 1' 30"
10	Wilco Kelderman (NED)	Bora–Hansgrohe	+ 2' 20"

== Classification leadership table ==
Classification leadership by stage
Stage	Winner	General classification	Points classification	Mountains classification	Young rider classification	Team classification	Combativity award
P	Rohan Dennis	Rohan Dennis	Rohan Dennis	Not awarded	Stefan Bissegger	INEOS Grenadiers	Not awarded
1	Peter Sagan	Rohan Dennis	Peter Sagan	Joel Suter	Marc Hirschi	INEOS Grenadiers	Joel Suter
2	Sonny Colbrelli	Rohan Dennis	Sonny Colbrelli	Joel Suter	Marc Hirschi	INEOS Grenadiers	Rein Taaramäe
3	Marc Soler	Marc Soler	Sonny Colbrelli	Joel Suter	Marc Hirschi	UAE Team Emirates	Stefan Küng
4	Michael Woods	Michael Woods	Sonny Colbrelli	Kobe Goossens	Thymen Arensman	INEOS Grenadiers	Magnus Cort
5	Rémi Cavagna	Geraint Thomas	Sonny Colbrelli	Kobe Goossens	Thymen Arensman	INEOS Grenadiers	Not awarded
Final		Geraint Thomas	Sonny Colbrelli	Kobe Goossens	Thymen Arensman	INEOS Grenadiers	Kobe Goossens

- On stage 1, Geraint Thomas, who was second in the points classification, wore the green jersey, because first-placed Rohan Dennis wore the yellow jersey as the leader of the general classification.

== Final classification standings ==
Legend
Denotes the winner of the general classification	Denotes the winner of the young rider classification
Denotes the winner of the points classification	Denotes the winner of the team classification
Denotes the winner of the mountains classification	Denotes the winner of the combativity award

=== General classification ===
Final general classification (1–10)
Rank	Rider	Team	Time
1	Geraint Thomas (GBR)	INEOS Grenadiers	17h 59' 57"
2	Richie Porte (AUS)	INEOS Grenadiers	+ 28"
3	Fausto Masnada (ITA)	Deceuninck–Quick-Step	+ 38"
4	Marc Soler (ESP)	Movistar Team	+ 39"
5	Michael Woods (CAN)	Israel Start-Up Nation	+ 43"
6	Ben O'Connor (AUS)	AG2R Citroën Team	+ 45"
7	Ion Izagirre (ESP)	Astana–Premier Tech	+ 1' 08"
8	Lucas Hamilton (AUS)	Team BikeExchange	+ 1' 22"
9	Damiano Caruso (ITA)	Team Bahrain Victorious	+ 1' 30"
10	Wilco Kelderman (NED)	Bora–Hansgrohe	+ 2' 20"

=== Points classification ===
Final points classification (1–10)
Rank	Rider	Team	Points
1	Sonny Colbrelli (ITA)	Team Bahrain Victorious	98
2	Marc Soler (ESP)	Movistar Team	77
3	Magnus Cort (DEN)	EF Education–Nippo	76
4	Peter Sagan (SVK)	Bora–Hansgrohe	70
5	Geraint Thomas (GBR)	INEOS Grenadiers	69
6	Richie Porte (AUS)	INEOS Grenadiers	54
7	Stefan Bissegger (SUI)	EF Education–Nippo	52
8	Rémi Cavagna (FRA)	Deceuninck–Quick-Step	49
9	Ilan Van Wilder (BEL)	Team DSM	48
10	Fausto Masnada (ITA)	Deceuninck–Quick-Step	42

=== Mountains classification ===
Final mountains classification (1–10)
Rank	Rider	Team	Points
1	Kobe Goossens (BEL)	Lotto–Soudal	48
2	Joel Suter (SUI)	Switzerland	43
3	Geraint Thomas (GBR)	INEOS Grenadiers	34
4	Davide Villella (ITA)	Movistar Team	34
5	Rein Taaramäe (EST)	Intermarché–Wanty–Gobert Matériaux	26
6	Simon Pellaud (SUI)	Switzerland	25
7	Antwan Tolhoek (NED)	Team Jumbo–Visma	20
8	Manuele Boaro (ITA)	Astana–Premier Tech	19
9	Michael Woods (CAN)	Israel Start-Up Nation	18
10	Robert Power (AUS)	Team Qhubeka Assos	14

=== Young rider classification ===
Final young rider classification (1–10)
Rank	Rider	Team	Time
1	Thymen Arensman (NED)	Team DSM	18h 02' 45"
2	Mattias Skjelmose Jensen (DEN)	Trek–Segafredo	+ 1' 37"
3	Ilan Van Wilder (BEL)	Team DSM	+ 3' 21"
4	Gijs Leemreize (NED)	Team Jumbo–Visma	+ 9' 36"
5	Clément Champoussin (FRA)	AG2R Citroën Team	+ 11' 54"
6	Felix Gall (AUT)	Team DSM	+ 12' 00"
7	Antonio Tiberi (ITA)	Trek–Segafredo	+ 12' 33"
8	Marc Hirschi (SUI)	UAE Team Emirates	+ 19' 45"
9	Andreas Kron (DEN)	Lotto–Soudal	+ 26' 44"
10	Marco Brenner (GER)	Team DSM	+ 28' 26"

=== Team classification ===
Final team classification (1–10)
Rank	Team	Time
1	INEOS Grenadiers	54h 07' 07"
2	Team DSM	+ 11' 50"
3	Team Jumbo–Visma	+ 15' 59"
4	Intermarché–Wanty–Gobert Matériaux	+ 20' 33"
5	Team Bahrain Victorious	+ 20' 47"
6	Trek–Segafredo	+ 23' 03"
7	Deceuninck–Quick-Step	+ 23' 41"
8	Astana–Premier Tech	+ 27' 04"
9	Movistar Team	+ 30' 44"
10	Groupama–FDJ	+ 31' 17"
