= 2022 Japan Cup =

2022 UCI ProSeries

Race details
- Dates: October 16
- Stages: 1
- Distance: 144.2 km (89.6 mi)
- Winning time: 3h 37' 49"

Results
	Winner	Neilson Powless (USA)	(EF Education–EasyPost)
	Second	Andrea Piccolo (ITA)	(EF Education–EasyPost)
	Third	Ben Dyball (AUS)	(Team Ukyo)

The 2022 Japan Cup was the 29th edition of the Japan Cup single-day cycling race. It was held on 16 October 2022, over a distance of 144.2 km, starting and finishing in Utsunomiya.

The race was won by Neilson Powless of EF Education–EasyPost.

== Teams ==
Five UCI WorldTeams, two UCI ProTeams, eight UCI Continental teams and the Japanese national team made up the 16 teams that participated in the race. In total, 156 riders started the race, of which 144 finished.

UCI WorldTeams

- Cofidis
- EF Education–EasyPost
- Lotto–Soudal
- Team Bahrain Victorious
- Trek–Segafredo

UCI ProTeams

- Euskaltel–Euskadi
- Team Novo Nordisk

UCI Continental teams

- Aisan Racing Team
- Kinan Racing Team
- Ljubljana Gusto Santic
- Nasu Blasen
- Shimano Racing
- Terengganu Polygon Cycling Team
- Team Ukyo
- Utsunomiya Blitzen

National team

- Japan

== Results ==
Result
Rank	Rider	Team	Time
1	Neilson Powless (USA)	EF Education–EasyPost	3h 37' 49"
2	Andrea Piccolo (ITA)	EF Education–EasyPost	+ 12"
3	Ben Dyball (AUS)	Team Ukyo	+ 13"
4	Hermann Pernsteiner (AUT)	Team Bahrain Victorious	+ 13"
5	Maxim Van Gils (BEL)	Lotto–Soudal	+ 17"
6	Guillaume Martin (FRA)	Cofidis	+ 17"
7	Giulio Ciccone (ITA)	Trek–Segafredo	+ 32"
8	Thomas Lebas (FRA)	Kinan Racing Team	+ 34"
9	Tim Wellens (BEL)	Lotto–Soudal	+ 1'32"
10	Gotzon Martín (ESP)	Euskaltel–Euskadi	+ 1'32"
