= 2024 Japan Cup =

2024 Utsunomiya Japan Cup Cycle Road Race
2024 UCI ProSeries

Race details
- Dates: 20 October 2024
- Stages: 1
- Distance: 144.2 km (89.6 mi)
- Winning time: 3h 33' 30"

Results
	Winner	Neilson Powless (USA)	(EF Education–EasyPost)
	Second	Ilan Van Wilder (BEL)	(Soudal–Quick-Step)
	Third	Matej Mohorič (SLO)	(Team Bahrain Victorious)

The 2024 Utsunomiya Japan Cup Cycle Road Race was the 31st edition of the Japan Cup single-day cycling race. It was held on 20 October 2024, over a distance of 144.2 km, starting and finishing in Utsunomiya.

The race was won by Neilson Powless of EF Education–EasyPost.

== Teams ==
Seven UCI WorldTeams, three UCI ProTeams, eight UCI Continental teams and the Japanese national team made up the nineteen teams that participated in the race.

UCI WorldTeams

- Astana Qazaqstan Team
- Cofidis
- EF Education–EasyPost
- Lidl–Trek
- Soudal–Quick-Step
- Team Bahrain Victorious
- Team Jayco–AlUla

UCI ProTeams

- Israel–Premier Tech
- Lotto–Dstny
- Team Novo Nordisk

UCI Continental teams

- Aisan Racing Team
- JCL Team Ukyo
- Kinan Racing Team
- Ljubljana Gusto Santic
- Matrix Powertag
- Shimano Racing
- Utsunomiya Blitzen
- Victoire Hiroshima

National team

- Japan

== Results ==
Result
Rank	Rider	Team	Time
1	Neilson Powless (USA)	EF Education–EasyPost	3h 33' 30"
2	Ilan Van Wilder (BEL)	Soudal–Quick-Step	+ 0"
3	Matej Mohorič (SLO)	Team Bahrain Victorious	+ 0"
4	Michael Woods (CAN)	Israel–Premier Tech	+ 0"
5	Mauri Vansevenant (BEL)	Soudal–Quick-Step	+ 4"
6	Julien Bernard (FRA)	Lidl–Trek	+ 4' 16"
7	Axel Zingle (FRA)	Cofidis	+ 4' 26"
8	Toms Skujiņš (LAT)	Lidl–Trek	+ 4' 35"
9	Lukas Nerurkar (GBR)	EF Education–EasyPost	+ 4' 35"
10	Edoardo Zambanini (ITA)	Team Bahrain Victorious	+ 4' 35"
