= 2021 Clásica de San Sebastián =

2021 UCI World Tour, race 22 of 29

Race details
- Dates: 31 July 2021
- Stages: 1
- Distance: 223.5 km (138.9 mi)
- Winning time: 5h 34' 31"

Results
	Winner	Neilson Powless (USA)	(EF Education–Nippo)
	Second	Matej Mohorič (SLO)	(Team Bahrain Victorious)
	Third	Mikkel Frølich Honoré (DEN)	(Deceuninck–Quick-Step)

The 2021 Clásica de San Sebastián was a road cycling one-day race that took place on 31 July 2021 in San Sebastián, Spain. It was the 40th edition of the Clásica de San Sebastián and the twenty-second event of the 2021 UCI World Tour. It was won by Neilson Powless in a three way sprint.

== Result ==
Result
Rank	Rider	Team	Time
1	Neilson Powless (USA)	EF Education–Nippo	5h 34' 31"
2	Matej Mohorič (SLO)	Team Bahrain Victorious	+ 0"
3	Mikkel Frølich Honoré (DEN)	Deceuninck–Quick-Step	+ 0"
4	Lorenzo Rota (ITA)	Intermarché–Wanty–Gobert Matériaux	+ 30"
5	Alessandro Covi (ITA)	UAE Team Emirates	+ 1' 04"
6	Julian Alaphilippe (FRA)	Deceuninck–Quick-Step	+ 1' 04"
7	Odd Christian Eiking (NOR)	Intermarché–Wanty–Gobert Matériaux	+ 1' 04"
8	Jonas Vingegaard (DEN)	Team Jumbo–Visma	+ 1' 04"
9	Gianni Moscon (ITA)	INEOS Grenadiers	+ 1' 04"
10	Bauke Mollema (NED)	Trek–Segafredo	+ 1' 04"
