= Joel Suter =

Swiss cyclist

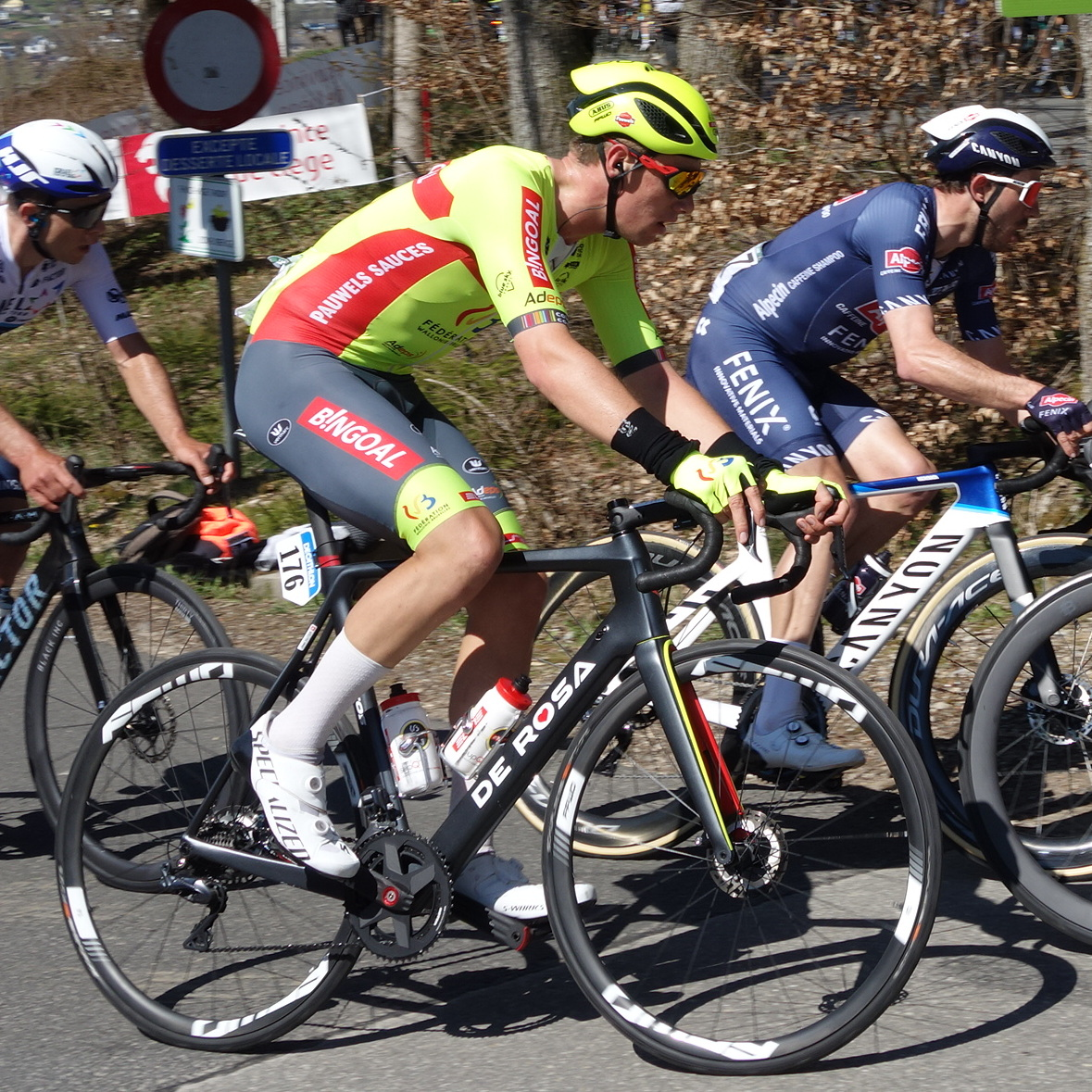
- Suter at the 2021 Liège-Bastogne-Liège

Personal information
- Born: 25 October 1998 (age 27) Frutigen, Switzerland
- Height: 1.90 m (6 ft 3 in)
- Weight: 75 kg (165 lb)

Cycling career
- Sport: Cycling
- Current team: Tudor Pro Cycling Team
- Discipline: Road
- Role: Rider

Amateur team
- 2017: Roth–Akros Devo

Professional teams
- 2018–2019: Akros–Renfer SA
- 2020–2021: Bingoal–Wallonie Bruxelles
- 2022: UAE Team Emirates
- 2023–: Tudor Pro Cycling Team

Major wins
- One-day races and Classics National Time Trial Championships (2022)

Joel Suter (born 7 July 1998) is a Swiss cyclist, who currently rides for UCI ProTeam Tudor Pro Cycling Team.

At the 2020 Tour du Limousin, he took the lead after finishing second to Fernando Gaviria on stage 2, but lost it the following day. However, he had another podium finish, placing third on the fourth and final stage.

== Major results ==
2016
3rd Time trial, National Junior Road Championships
2019
1st Stage 2 (TTT) Tour de l'Avenir
2nd Paris–Tours Espoirs
10th Kattekoers
2020
2nd Time trial, National Under-23 Road Championships
2021
5th Road race, National Road Championships
2022
1st Time trial, National Road Championships
2nd Trofeo Calvià
2023
1st Stage 3 Giro di Sicilia
10th Overall Étoile de Bessèges
2025
5th Time trial, National Road Championships
