= Andrea Piccolo =

Italian cyclist (born 2001)

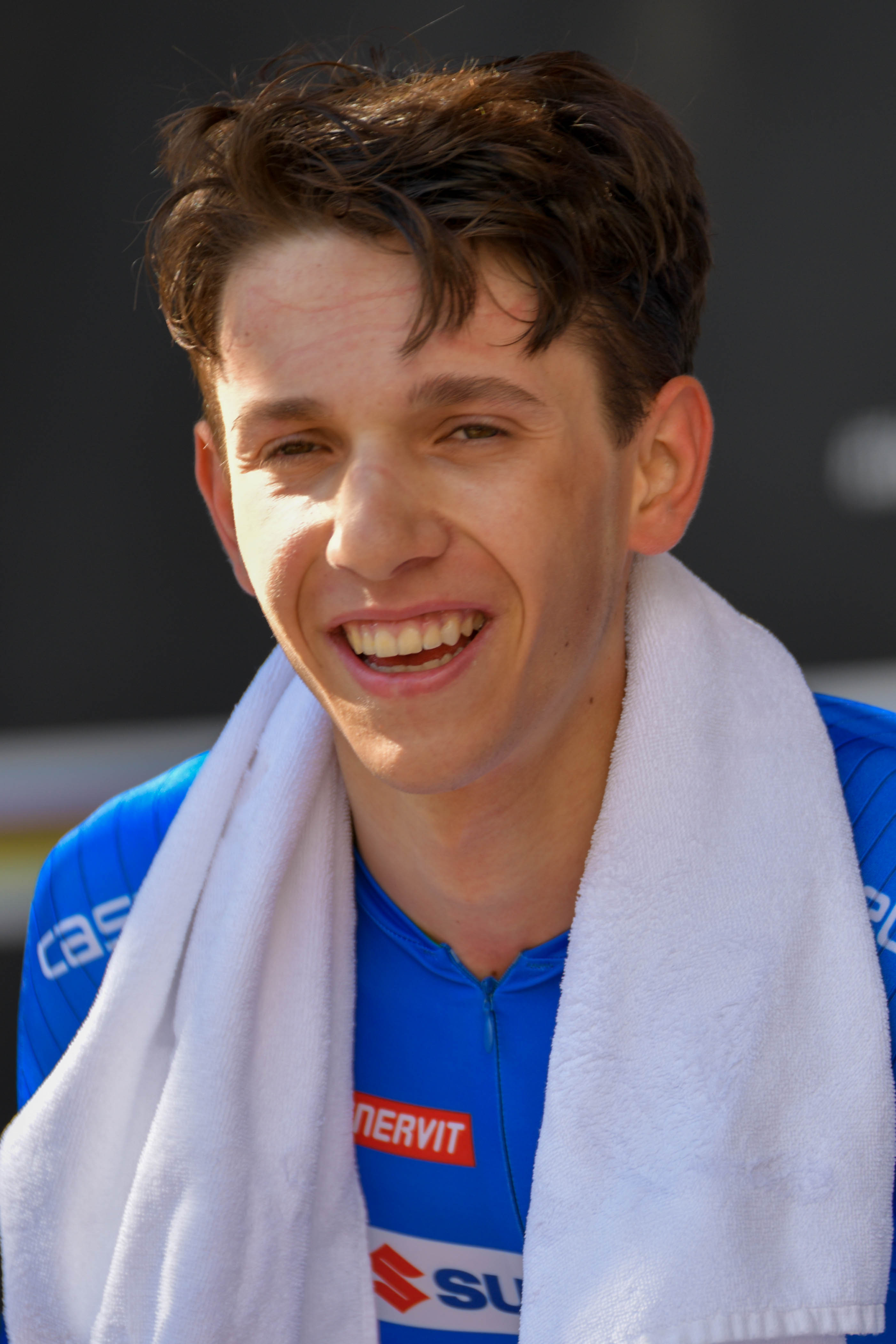
- Piccolo at the 2018 UCI Road World Championships

Personal information
- Full name: Andrea Piccolo
- Born: 23 March 2001 (age 25) Magenta, Italy
- Height: 1.81 m (5 ft 11 in)
- Weight: 64 kg (141 lb)

Cycling career
- Sport: Cycling
- Discipline: Road
- Role: Rider
- Rider type: All-rounder

Amateur teams
- 2018–2019: Team Lvf
- 2021: Viris Vigevano

Professional teams
- 2020: Team Colpack–Ballan
- 2021: Astana–Premier Tech
- 2022: Gazprom–RusVelo
- 2022: Drone Hopper–Androni Giocattoli
- 2022–2024: EF Education–EasyPost

Andrea Piccolo (born 23 March 2001) is an Italian professional racing cyclist, who previously rode for UCI WorldTeam EF Education–EasyPost. His contract was terminated by EF Education-EasyPost after he was stopped at Italian customs allegedly carrying Human Growth Hormone.

== Career ==
In 2019, Piccolo won the Junior time trial at the UEC European Road Championships. Piccolo had originally signed with UCI WorldTeam Astana–Premier Tech for the 2021 season but left the team at the end of May, having not raced for the team at all after health issues were detected during an early season training camp.

== Major results ==
2018
1st Time trial, National Junior Road Championships
1st Trofeo Emilio Paganessi
2nd Overall Trophée Centre Morbihan

1st Mountains classification
1st Young rider classification

3rd Time trial, UCI Junior Road World Championships
3rd Overall Giro del Nordest d'Italia

1st Young rider classification

4th Overall GP Général Patton
4th Trofeo Citta di Loano
10th Trofeo Buffoni
2019
UEC European Junior Road Championships

1st Time trial
3rd Road race

National Junior Road Championships

1st Time trial
2nd Road race

1st Overall Giro della Lunigiana
3rd Overall Course de la Paix Juniors
6th Time trial, UCI Junior Road World Championships
6th Trofeo Emilio Paganessi
7th Gent–Wevelgem Juniors
7th Trofeo Buffoni
2020
2nd Time trial, National Under-23 Road Championships
2021
1st Ruota d'Oro
1st Coppa Collecchio
2nd GP Capodarco
8th Piccolo Giro di Lombardia
9th Veneto Classic
2022
2nd Circuito de Getxo
2nd Japan Cup
3rd Coppa Agostoni
4th Road race, National Road Championships
5th Maryland Cycling Classic
6th Overall Sibiu Cycling Tour
7th Prueba Villafranca de Ordizia
10th Bretagne Classic
10th Coppa Sabatini
2023
Vuelta a España

Held & after Stage 2

2024
Combativity award Stage 2 Giro d'Italia

=== Grand Tour general classification results timeline ===
Grand Tour	2023	2024
Giro d'Italia	—	DNF
Tour de France	—	—
Vuelta a España	69	—

Legend
—	Did not compete
DNF	Did not finish
