= 2023 Grand Prix La Marseillaise =

2023 UCI Europe Tour

Race details
- Dates: 29 January 2023
- Stages: 1
- Distance: 167.8 km (104.3 mi)
- Winning time: 4h 19' 13"

Results
	Winner	Neilson Powless (USA)	(EF Education–EasyPost)
	Second	Valentin Ferron (FRA)	(Team TotalEnergies)
	Third	Brent Van Moer (BEL)	(Lotto–Dstny)

The 2023 Grand Prix La Marseillaise was the 44th edition of the Grand Prix La Marseillaise cycle race. It was held on 29 January 2023 as a category 1.1 race on the 2023 UCI Europe Tour. The race started in Marseille and finished in Septèmes-les-Vallons. The race was won by Neilson Powless of EF Education–EasyPost in a solo victory after attacking the leading breakaway of nine before ascending the final climb, Col de la Gineste.

== Teams ==
Six of the 18 UCI WorldTeams, nine UCI ProTeams, and five UCI Continental teams made up the 20 teams that entered the race, with all entering the maximum of seven riders except for EF Education–EasyPost, who entered six.

UCI WorldTeams

- AG2R Citroën Team
- Alpecin–Deceuninck
- Arkéa–Samsic
- Cofidis
- EF Education–EasyPost
- Groupama–FDJ

UCI ProTeams

- Bingoal WB
- Caja Rural–Seguros RGA
- Equipo Kern Pharma
- Israel–Premier Tech
- Lotto–Dstny
- Team Flanders–Baloise
- Team TotalEnergies
- Tudor Pro Cycling Team
- Uno-X Pro Cycling Team

UCI Continental Teams

- Beltrami TSA–Tre Colli
- Go Sport–Roubaix–Lille Métropole
- Nice Métropole Côte d'Azur
- St. Michel–Mavic–Auber93
- CIC U Nantes Atlantique

== Result ==
Result
Rank	Rider	Team	Time
1	Neilson Powless (USA)	EF Education–EasyPost	4h 19' 13"
2	Valentin Ferron (FRA)	Team TotalEnergies	+ 1' 15"
3	Brent Van Moer (BEL)	Lotto–Dstny	+ 1' 15"
4	Jenno Berckmoes (BEL)	Team Flanders–Baloise	+ 1' 15"
5	Krists Neilands (LAT)	Team Flanders–Baloise	+ 1' 15"
6	Pierre-Luc Périchon (FRA)	Cofidis	+ 1' 15"
7	Thibault Guernalec (FRA)	Arkéa–Samsic	+ 1' 15"
8	Lenny Martinez (FRA)	Groupama–FDJ	+ 1' 15"
9	Enzo Paleni (FRA)	Groupama–FDJ	+ 1' 15"
10	Petr Kelemen (CZE)	Tudor Pro Cycling Team	+ 1' 19"
