= 2022 Team Jumbo–Visma (men's team) season =

Cycling team

Team Jumbo–Visma
- 2022 season
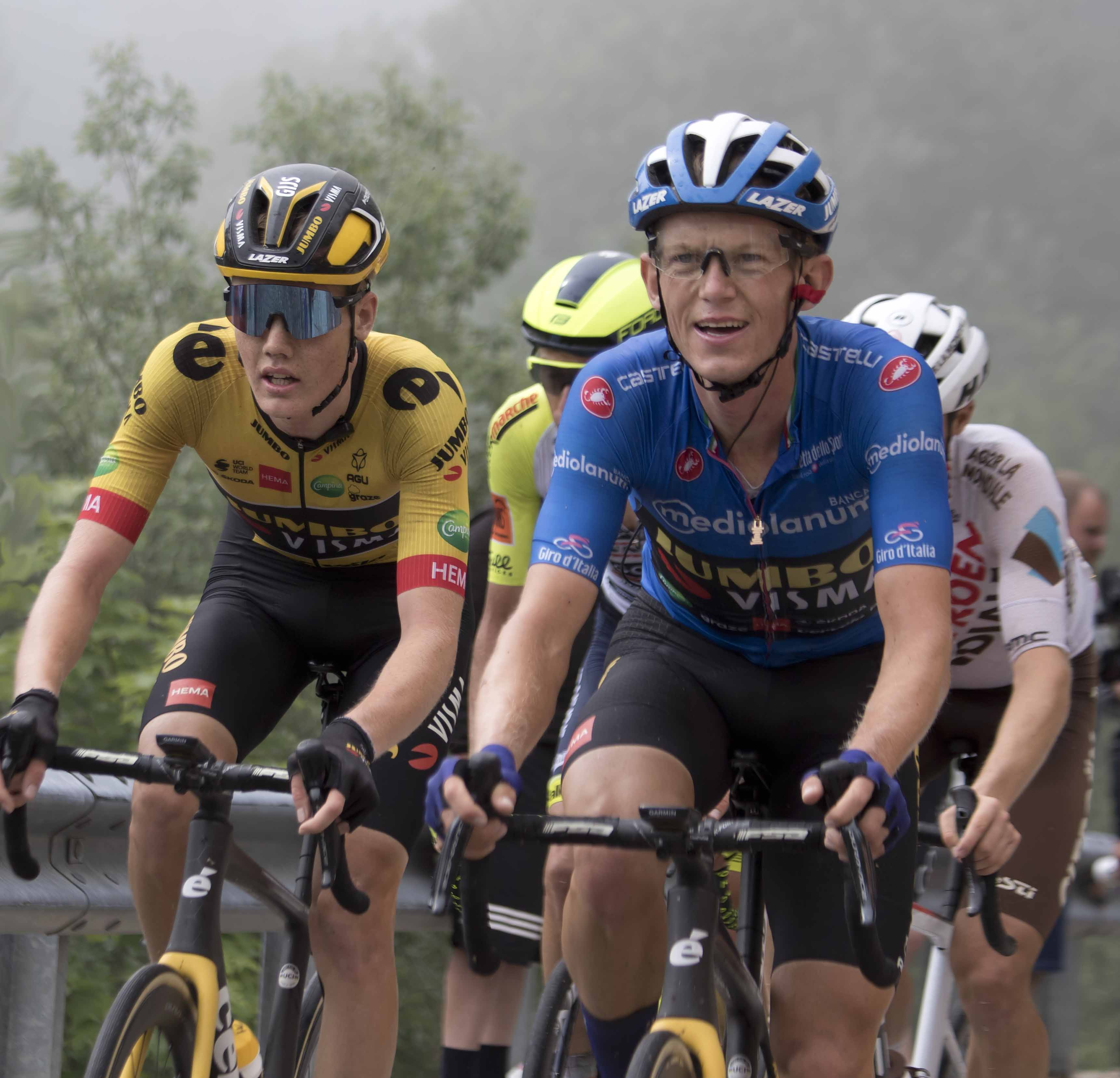
- Team Jumbo–Visma on Giro d'Italia
- UCI code: TJV
- Status: UCI WorldTeam
- Manager: Richard Plugge (NED)
- Main sponsor(s): Jumbo; Visma
- Based: Netherlands
- Bicycles: Cervélo
- Groupset: Shimano

Season victories
- One-day races: 3
- Stage race overall: 3
- Stage race stages: 11
- National Championships: 1
- Jersey

The 2022 season for Team Jumbo–Visma is the team's 39th season overall and the fourth season under the current name. The team has been a UCI WorldTeam since 2005, when the tier was first established. They use Cervélo bicycles, Shimano drivetrain, Shimano wheels and Agu clothing.

The team started their season at the Volta a la Comunitat Valenciana.

== Team roster ==
As of 7 January 2022.

Rider	Date of birth
Edoardo Affini (ITA)	24 June 1996 (aged 25)
Tiesj Benoot (BEL)	11 March 1994 (aged 27)
Koen Bouwman (NED)	2 December 1993 (aged 28)
David Dekker (NED)	2 February 1998 (aged 23)
Rohan Dennis (AUS)	28 May 1990 (aged 31)
Tom Dumoulin (NED)	11 November 1990 (aged 31)
Pascal Eenkhoorn (NED)	8 February 1997 (aged 24)
Tobias Foss (NOR)	25 May 1997 (aged 24)
Robert Gesink (NED)	31 May 1986 (aged 35)
Chris Harper (AUS)	23 November 1994 (aged 27)
Michel Hessmann (GER)	6 April 2001 (aged 20)
Lennard Hofstede (NED)	29 December 1994 (aged 27)
Olav Kooij (NED)	17 October 2001 (aged 20)
Steven Kruijswijk (NED)	7 June 1987 (aged 34)
Sepp Kuss (USA)	13 September 1994 (aged 27)

Rider	Date of birth
Christophe Laporte (FRA)	11 December 1992 (aged 29)
Gijs Leemreize (NED)	23 October 1999 (aged 22)
Sam Oomen (NED)	15 August 1995 (aged 26)
Primož Roglič (SLO)	29 October 1989 (aged 32)
Timo Roosen (NED)	11 January 1993 (aged 28)
Mike Teunissen (NED)	25 August 1992 (aged 29)
Milan Vader (NED)	18 February 1996 (aged 25)
Wout van Aert (BEL)	15 September 1994 (aged 27)
Tosh Van der Sande (BEL)	28 November 1990 (aged 31)
Mick van Dijke (NED)	15 March 2000 (aged 21)
Tim van Dijke (NED)	15 March 2000 (aged 21)
Jos van Emden (NED)	27 June 1985 (aged 36)
Nathan Van Hooydonck (BEL)	October 12, 1995 (aged 26)
Jonas Vingegaard (DEN)	10 December 1996 (aged 25)

Riders who joined the team for the 2022 season

Rider	2021 team
Tiesj Benoot	Team DSM
Rohan Dennis	Ineos Grenadiers
Michel Hessmann	neo-pro (Jumbo–Visma Development Team)
Christophe Laporte	Cofidis
Milan Vader	neo-pro (KMC–Orbea mountain biking)
Tim van Dijke	neo-pro (Jumbo–Visma Development Team)
Tosh Van der Sande	Lotto–Soudal

Riders who left the team during or after the 2021 season

Rider	2022 team
George Bennett	UAE Team Emirates
Dylan Groenewegen	Team BikeExchange–Jayco
Paul Martens (Note: Martens retired on 30 May 2021, following the conclusion of the 2021 Giro d'Italia.)	Retired
Tony Martin	Retired
Christoph Pfingsten	Retired
Antwan Tolhoek	Trek–Segafredo
Maarten Wynants (Note: Wynants originally wished to retire after Paris–Roubaix, which had been scheduled for 11 April 2021. However, when the race was postponed to 3 October 2021, Wynants decided to retire after the Tour of Flanders on 4 April 2021, at which point he transitioned into a sports director role for the team.)	Retired

== One-day races ==
The team's first One-day Race victory came at Omloop Het Nieuwsblad where Wout van Aert attacked from a small group of 'favorites' with 13 km to go at the base of the Bosberg. He managed to get a gap of 10s with 9.6 km to go. At 3 km to the finish he had a gap of 27s and managed to hold off the chasing group and win the race.

Also on at the same time was the Faun-Ardèche Classic where the team sent a strong team with leader Primož Roglič. With 8 km to go a group of 3 was chasing leader on the road Brandon McNulty of UAE Team Emirates. The chase group contained Sepp Kuss from the team with Mauri Vansevenant of Quick-Step Alpha Vinyl Team and Clément Champoussin of AG2R Citroën Team. An attack by Kuss with 7 km to go dropped Champoussin from the group. The remaining pair held of the peloton but didn't catch McNulty and sprinted for the line with Kuss finishing third.

The following day was the La Drôme Classic where Dane Jonas Vingegaard showed he was in good form by taking the win. He attacked from the peloton on the Col de la Grande Limite taking Vansevenant, Juan Ayuso of UAE Team Emirates and Victor Lafay of Cofidis with him. On the Côte des Roberts Ayuso attacked with Vingegaard the only rider able to follow, the pair worked together having an advantage of 17s to the chasing group and 54s to the peloton with 20 km remaining. With 300m to go Vingegaard attacked with chasers Benoît Cosnefroy and Guillaume Martin passing Ayuso but coming to finish 3s behind Vingegaard.

== Stage races ==
The first stage race that the team rode was the Volta a la Comunitat Valenciana. The team came to the race in support of Dutch sprinter David Dekker hoping to win stages. With 12 km to go in stage 2 Dekker, a stage which the team was working for him, crashed into a ravine after mis-judging a corner in the descent. Although he escaped serious injury he still abandoned the race that stage. The team didn't start stage 4 and pulled all riders from the race after members of the team tested positive for COVID-19.

The Volta ao Algarve was the next stage race for the team. Norwegian Tobias Foss was the team's leader in the race with Maarten Wynants, Team Directeur sportif, stating "Tobias can do well here". The first mountain stage was stage 2 of the tour with Foss crashing in the final sprint after bumping shoulders with Sergio Higuita he lost 41s to stage winner David Gaudu. The stage 4 time trial was dominated by Belgian Remco Evenepoel taking the victory by 58s with Foss finishing in fourth 1 minute and 11s down. Stage 5 was the final stage which finished up another mountain. Foss came home sixth securing his sixth place overall in the Tour. Johannes Staune-Mittet who is part of the development team, Jumbo–Visma Development Team, and rode with the Pro team at this race finished second in the Youth classification.

== Season victories ==
Date	Race	Competition	Rider	Country	Location	Ref.
26 February	Omloop Het Nieuwsblad	UCI World Tour	Wout van Aert (BEL)	Belgium	Ninove	
27 February	La Drôme Classic	UCI ProSeries	Jonas Vingegaard (DEN)	France	Étoile-sur-Rhône	
6 March	Paris–Nice, Stage 1	UCI World Tour	Christophe Laporte (FRA)	France	Mantes-la-Ville	
9 March	Paris–Nice, Stage 4 (ITT)	UCI World Tour	Wout van Aert (BEL)	France	Montluçon	
12 March	Paris–Nice, Stage 7	UCI World Tour	Primož Roglič (SLO)	France	Col de Turini	
13 March	Paris–Nice, Overall	UCI World Tour	Primož Roglič (SLO)	France		
13 March	Paris–Nice, Points classification	UCI World Tour	Wout van Aert (BEL)	France		
25 March	E3 Saxo Bank Classic	UCI World Tour	Wout van Aert (BEL)	Belgium	Harelbeke	
4 April	Tour of the Basque Country, Stage 1 (ITT)	UCI World Tour	Primož Roglič (SLO)	Spain	Hondarribia	
6 April	Circuit de la Sarthe, Stage 2	UCI Europe Tour	Olav Kooij (NED)	France	Le Lude	
8 April	Circuit de la Sarthe, Stage 4	UCI Europe Tour	Olav Kooij (NED)	France	La Chapelle-Saint-Aubin	
8 April	Circuit de la Sarthe, Overall	UCI Europe Tour	Olav Kooij (NED)	France		
8 April	Circuit de la Sarthe, Young rider classification	UCI Europe Tour	Olav Kooij (NED)	France		
11 May	Tour de Hongrie, Stage 1	UCI Europe Tour	Olav Kooij (NED)	Hungary	Székesfehérvár	
13 May	Giro d'Italia, Stage 7	UCI World Tour	Koen Bouwman (NED)	Italy	Potenza	
27 May	Giro d'Italia, Stage 19	UCI World Tour	Koen Bouwman (NED)	Italy	Santuario di Castelmonte	
29 May	Giro d'Italia, Mountains classification	UCI World Tour	Koen Bouwman (NED)	Italy		
5 June	Critérium du Dauphiné, Stage 1	UCI World Tour	Wout van Aert (BEL)	France	Beauchastel	
12 June	Critérium du Dauphiné, Stage 8	UCI World Tour	Jonas Vingegaard (DEN)	France	Plateau de Solaison	
12 June	Critérium du Dauphiné, Overall	UCI World Tour	Primož Roglič (SLO)	France		
12 June	Critérium du Dauphiné, Points classification	UCI World Tour	Wout van Aert (BEL)	France		
12 June	Critérium du Dauphiné, Team classification	UCI World Tour	(Note: The riders in the squad were Primož Roglič. Jonas Vingegaard, Christophe Laporte, Steven Kruijswijk, Chris Harper, Tiesj Benoot, and Wout van Aert)	France		
5 July	Tour de France, Stage 4	UCI World Tour	Wout van Aert (BEL)	France		
9 July	Tour de France, Stage 8	UCI World Tour	Wout van Aert (BEL)	France		
11 July	Tour de France, Stage 11	UCI World Tour	Jonas Vingegaard (DEN)	France		
18 July	Tour de France, Stage 18	UCI World Tour	Jonas Vingegaard (DEN)	France		
22 July	Tour de France, Stage 19	UCI World Tour	Christophe Laporte (FRA)	France		
23 July	Tour de France, Stage 20	UCI World Tour	Wout van Aert (BEL)	France		
24 July	Tour de France, Overall	UCI World Tour	Jonas Vingegaard (DEN)	France		
24 July	Tour de France, Points classification	UCI World Tour	Wout van Aert (BEL)	France		
24 July	Tour de France, Mountains classification	UCI World Tour	Jonas Vingegaard (DEN)	France		

== National, Continental, and World Champions ==
Date	Discipline	Jersey	Rider	Country	Location	Ref.
12 January	Australian National Time Trial Championships		Rohan Dennis (AUS)	Australia	Ballarat	
