= 2021 Team Jumbo–Visma (men's team) season =

Team Jumbo–Visma
- 2021 season
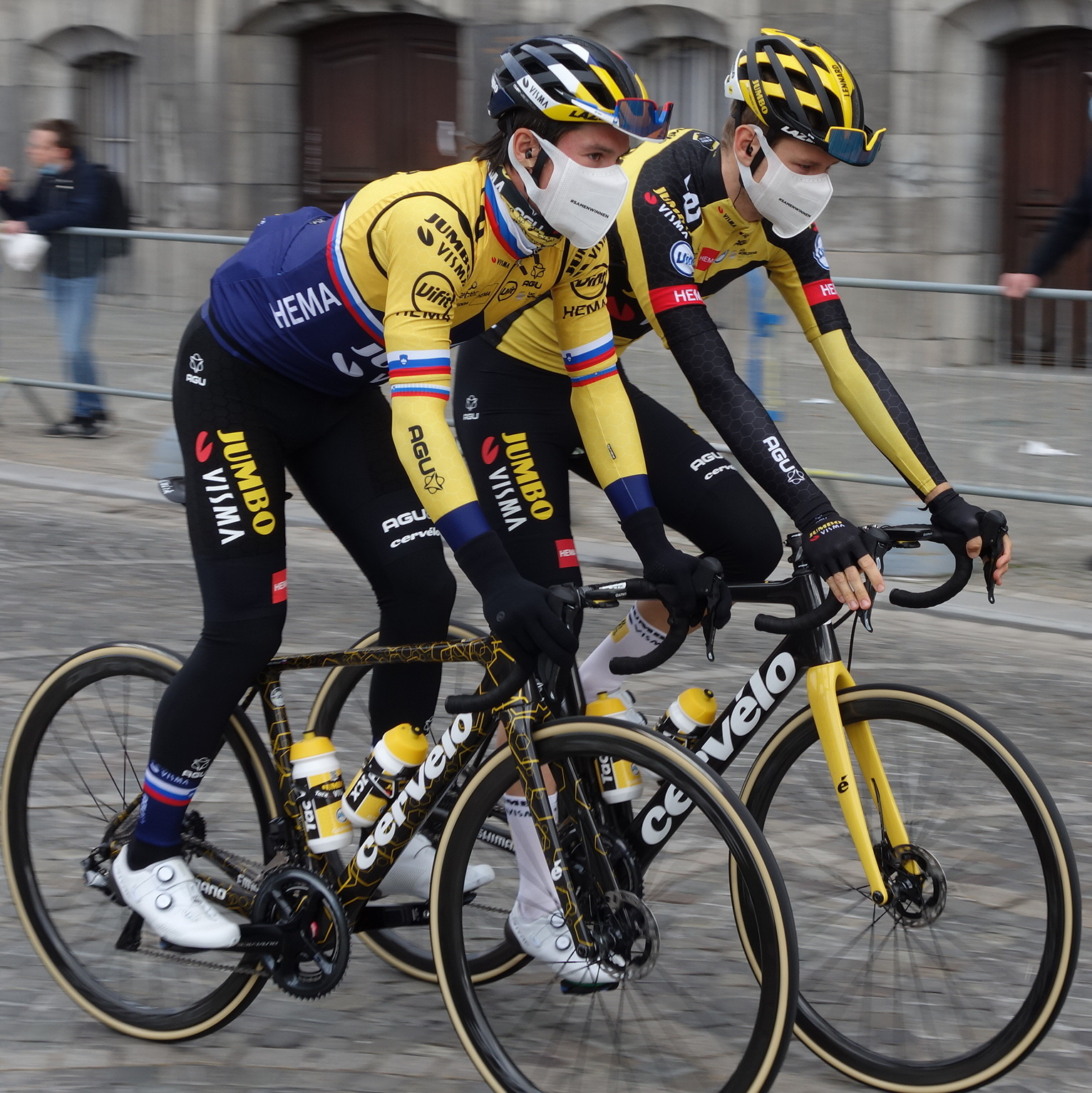
- Primož Roglič (left) and Lennard Hofstede at the start of Liège-Bastogne-Liège
- UCI code: TJV
- Status: UCI WorldTeam
- World Tour Rank: 3rd
- Manager: Richard Plugge (NED)
- Main sponsor(s): Jumbo; Visma
- Based: Netherlands
- Bicycles: Cervélo
- Groupset: Shimano

Season victories
- One-day races: 5
- Stage race overall: 4
- Stage race stages: 27
- Grand Tours: 1
- National Championships: 7
- Most wins: Primož Roglič (SLO) (15)
- Best ranked rider: Wout van Aert (BEL) (2nd)
- Jersey

The 2021 season for Team Jumbo–Visma was the team's 38th season overall and the third season under the current name. The team has been a UCI WorldTeam since 2005, when the tier was first established. Ahead of the season, the team changed bicycle sponsor, as Canadian manufacturer Cervélo replaced Italian manufacturer Bianchi, which had been used by the team since 2014; the team also changed from rim brakes to disc brakes.

== Team roster ==
As of 5 September 2021.

Rider	Date of birth
Edoardo Affini (ITA)	24 June 1996 (aged 24)
George Bennett (NZL)	7 April 1990 (aged 30)
Koen Bouwman (NED)	2 December 1993 (aged 27)
David Dekker (NED)	2 February 1998 (aged 22)
Tom Dumoulin (Note: On 23 January, Dumoulin decided to take an indefinite break from cycling and left the team's training camp. On 6 June, he made his return to racing at the Tour de Suisse.) (NED)	11 November 1990 (aged 30)
Pascal Eenkhoorn (NED)	8 February 1997 (aged 23)
Tobias Foss (NOR)	25 May 1997 (aged 23)
Robert Gesink (NED)	31 May 1986 (aged 34)
Dylan Groenewegen (NED)	21 June 1993 (aged 27)
Chris Harper (AUS)	23 November 1994 (aged 26)
Lennard Hofstede (NED)	29 December 1994 (aged 26)
Olav Kooij (Note: Kooij's promotion from the Jumbo–Visma Development Team was originally scheduled for 1 July, but it was moved up to 18 February.) (NED)	17 October 2001 (aged 19)
Steven Kruijswijk (NED)	7 June 1987 (aged 33)
Sepp Kuss (USA)	13 September 1994 (aged 26)
Gijs Leemreize (NED)	23 October 1999 (aged 21)

Rider	Date of birth
Paul Martens (Note: Martens retired on 30 May, following the conclusion of the Giro d'Italia.) (GER)	26 October 1983 (aged 37)
Tony Martin (GER)	23 April 1985 (aged 35)
Sam Oomen (NED)	15 August 1995 (aged 25)
Christoph Pfingsten (GER)	20 November 1987 (aged 33)
Primož Roglič (SLO)	29 October 1989 (aged 31)
Timo Roosen (NED)	11 January 1993 (aged 27)
Mike Teunissen (NED)	25 August 1992 (aged 28)
Antwan Tolhoek (NED)	29 April 1994 (aged 26)
Wout van Aert (BEL)	15 September 1994 (aged 26)
Mick van Dijke (Note: Van Dijke's promotion from the Jumbo–Visma Development Team was originally scheduled for 1 January 2022, but it was moved up to 5 September 2021.) (NED)	15 March 2000 (aged 20)
Jos van Emden (NED)	27 June 1985 (aged 35)
Nathan Van Hooydonck (BEL)	October 12, 1995 (aged 25)
Jonas Vingegaard (DEN)	10 December 1996 (aged 24)
Maarten Wynants (Note: Wynants originally wished to retire after Paris–Roubaix, originally scheduled for 11 April. However, when the race was postponed to 3 October, Wynants decided to retire after the Tour of Flanders on 4 April, at which point he transitioned into a sports director role for the team.) (BEL)	13 May 1982 (aged 38)

Riders who joined the team for the 2021 season

Rider	2020 team
Edoardo Affini	Mitchelton–Scott
David Dekker	neo-pro (SEG Racing Academy)
Olav Kooij	neo-pro (Jumbo–Visma Development Team)
Gijs Leemreize	neo-pro (Jumbo–Visma Development Team)
Sam Oomen	Team Sunweb
Mick van Dijke	neo-pro (Jumbo–Visma Development Team)
Nathan Van Hooydonck	CCC Team

Riders who left the team during or after the 2020 season

Rider	2021 team
Laurens De Plus	INEOS Grenadiers
Amund Grøndahl Jansen	Team BikeExchange
Tom Leezer	Retired
Bert-Jan Lindeman	Team Qhubeka Assos
Taco van der Hoorn	Intermarché–Wanty–Gobert Matériaux

== Season victories ==
Date	Race	Competition	Rider	Country	Location	Ref.
25 February	UAE Tour, Stage 5	UCI World Tour	Jonas Vingegaard (DEN)	United Arab Emirates	Jebel Jais	
27 February	UAE Tour, Points classification	UCI World Tour	David Dekker (NED)	United Arab Emirates		
10 March	Paris–Nice, Stage 4	UCI World Tour	Primož Roglič (SLO)	France	Camaiore	
10 March	Tirreno–Adriatico, Stage 1	UCI World Tour	Wout van Aert (BEL)	Italy	Chiroubles	
12 March	Paris–Nice, Stage 6	UCI World Tour	Primož Roglič (SLO)	France	Biot	
13 March	Paris–Nice, Stage 7	UCI World Tour	Primož Roglič (SLO)	France	Valdeblore La Colmiane	
14 March	Paris–Nice, Points classification	UCI World Tour	Primož Roglič (SLO)	France		
16 March	Tirreno–Adriatico, Stage 7 (ITT)	UCI World Tour	Wout van Aert (BEL)	Italy	San Benedetto del Tronto	
16 March	Tirreno–Adriatico, Points classification	UCI World Tour	Wout van Aert (BEL)	Italy		
24 March	Settimana Internazionale di Coppi e Bartali, Stage 2	UCI Europe Tour	Jonas Vingegaard (DEN)	Italy	Sogliano al Rubicone	
26 March	Settimana Internazionale di Coppi e Bartali, Stage 4	UCI Europe Tour	Jonas Vingegaard (DEN)	Italy	San Marino	
27 March	Settimana Internazionale di Coppi e Bartali, Overall	UCI Europe Tour	Jonas Vingegaard (DEN)	Italy		
27 March	Settimana Internazionale di Coppi e Bartali, Points classification	UCI Europe Tour	Jonas Vingegaard (DEN)	Italy		
28 March	Gent–Wevelgem	UCI World Tour	Wout van Aert (BEL)	Belgium	Wevelgem	
5 April	Tour of the Basque Country, Stage 1 (ITT)	UCI World Tour	Primož Roglič (SLO)	Spain	Bilbao	
10 April	Tour of the Basque Country, Overall	UCI World Tour	Primož Roglič (SLO)	Spain		
10 April	Tour of the Basque Country, Points classification	UCI World Tour	Primož Roglič (SLO)	Spain		
10 April	Tour of the Basque Country, Mountains classification	UCI World Tour	Primož Roglič (SLO)	Spain		
10 April	Tour of the Basque Country, Young rider classification	UCI World Tour	Jonas Vingegaard (DEN)	Spain		
10 April	Tour of the Basque Country, Team classification	UCI World Tour	(Note: The riders in the squad were Tobias Foss, Lennard Hofstede, Sam Oomen, Christoph Pfingsten, Primož Roglič, Antwan Tolhoek, and Jonas Vingegaard.)	Spain		
18 April	Amstel Gold Race	UCI World Tour	Wout van Aert (BEL)	Netherlands	Berg en Terblijt	
13 June	Tour of Belgium, Team classification	UCI Europe Tour; UCI ProSeries	(Note: The riders in the squad were Koen Bouwman, David Dekker, Pascal Eenkhoorn, Finn Fisher-Black, Dylan Groenewegen, Olav Kooij, and Mick van Dijke.)	Belgium		
13 June	Tour de Suisse, Team classification	UCI World Tour	(Note: The riders in the squad were Tom Dumoulin, Gijs Leemreize, Sam Oomen, Christoph Pfingsten, Mike Teunissen, Antwan Tolhoek, and Nathan Van Hooydonck.)	Switzerland		
7 July	Tour de France, Stage 11	UCI World Tour	Wout van Aert (BEL)	France	Malaucène	
11 July	Tour de France, Stage 15	UCI World Tour	Sepp Kuss (USA)	Andorra	Andorra la Vella	
17 July	Tour de France, Stage 20 (ITT)	UCI World Tour	Wout van Aert (BEL)	France	Saint-Émilion	
18 July	Tour de France, Stage 21	UCI World Tour	Wout van Aert (BEL)	France	Paris (Champs-Élysées)	
20 July	Tour de Wallonie, Stage 1	UCI Europe Tour; UCI ProSeries	Dylan Groenewegen (NED)	Belgium	Héron	
23 July	Tour de Wallonie, Stage 4	UCI Europe Tour; UCI ProSeries	Dylan Groenewegen (NED)	Belgium	Fleurus	
24 July	Tour de Wallonie, Points classification	UCI Europe Tour; UCI ProSeries	Dylan Groenewegen (NED)	Belgium		
31 July	Heistse Pijl	UCI Europe Tour	Pascal Eenkhoorn (NED)	Belgium	Heist-op-den-Berg	
10 August	Danmark Rundt, Stage 1	UCI Europe Tour; UCI ProSeries	Dylan Groenewegen (NED)	Denmark	Esbjerg	
14 August	Vuelta a España, Stage 1 (ITT)	UCI World Tour	Primož Roglič (SLO)	Spain	Burgos	
22 August	Tour of Norway, Points classification	UCI Europe Tour; UCI ProSeries	Mike Teunissen (NED)	Norway		
25 August	Vuelta a España, Stage 11	UCI World Tour	Primož Roglič (SLO)	Spain	Valdepeñas de Jaén	
1 September	Vuelta a España, Stage 17	UCI World Tour	Primož Roglič (SLO)	Spain	Lagos de Covadonga	
5 September	Tour of Britain, Stage 1	UCI Europe Tour; UCI ProSeries	Wout van Aert (BEL)	United Kingdom	Bodmin	
5 September	Vuelta a España, Stage 21 (ITT)	UCI World Tour	Primož Roglič (SLO)	Spain	Santiago de Compostela	
5 September	Vuelta a España, Overall	UCI World Tour	Primož Roglič (SLO)	Spain		
8 September	Tour of Britain, Stage 4	UCI Europe Tour; UCI ProSeries	Wout van Aert (BEL)	United Kingdom	Great Orme (Llandudno)	
10 September	Tour of Britain, Stage 6	UCI Europe Tour; UCI ProSeries	Wout van Aert (BEL)	United Kingdom	Gateshead	
12 September	Tour of Britain, Stage 8	UCI Europe Tour; UCI ProSeries	Wout van Aert (BEL)	United Kingdom	Aberdeen	
12 September	Tour of Britain, Overall	UCI Europe Tour; UCI ProSeries	Wout van Aert (BEL)	United Kingdom		
29 September	CRO Race, Stage 2	UCI Europe Tour	Olav Kooij (NED)	Croatia	Otočac	
1 October	CRO Race, Stage 4	UCI Europe Tour	Olav Kooij (NED)	Croatia	Crikvenica	
2 October	Giro dell'Emilia	UCI Europe Tour; UCI ProSeries	Primož Roglič (SLO)	Italy	Madonna di San Luca	
3 October	CRO Race, Stage 6	UCI Europe Tour	Tim van Dijke (NED)	Croatia	Zagreb	
3 October	CRO Race, Points classification	UCI Europe Tour	Olav Kooij (NED)	Croatia		
3 October	CRO Race, Young rider classification	UCI Europe Tour	Mick van Dijke (NED)	Croatia		
6 October	Milano–Torino	UCI Europe Tour; UCI ProSeries	Primož Roglič (SLO)	Italy	Turin	

== National, Continental, and World Champions ==
Date	Discipline	Jersey	Rider	Country	Location	Ref.
14 February	New Zealand National Road Race Championships		George Bennett (NZL)	New Zealand	Cambridge	
16 June	Dutch National Time Trial Championships		Tom Dumoulin (NED)	Netherlands	Emmen	
17 June	Norwegian National Time Trial Championships		Tobias Foss (NOR)	Norway	Evje	
19 June	German National Time Trial Championships		Tony Martin (GER)	Germany	Öschelbronn	
20 June	Dutch National Road Race Championships		Timo Roosen (NED)	Netherlands	Drijber	
20 June	Norwegian National Road Race Championships		Tobias Foss (NOR)	Norway	Kristiansand	
20 June	Belgian National Road Race Championships		Wout van Aert (BEL)	Belgium	Waregem	
