= Lars Boven =

Dutch cyclist (born 2001)

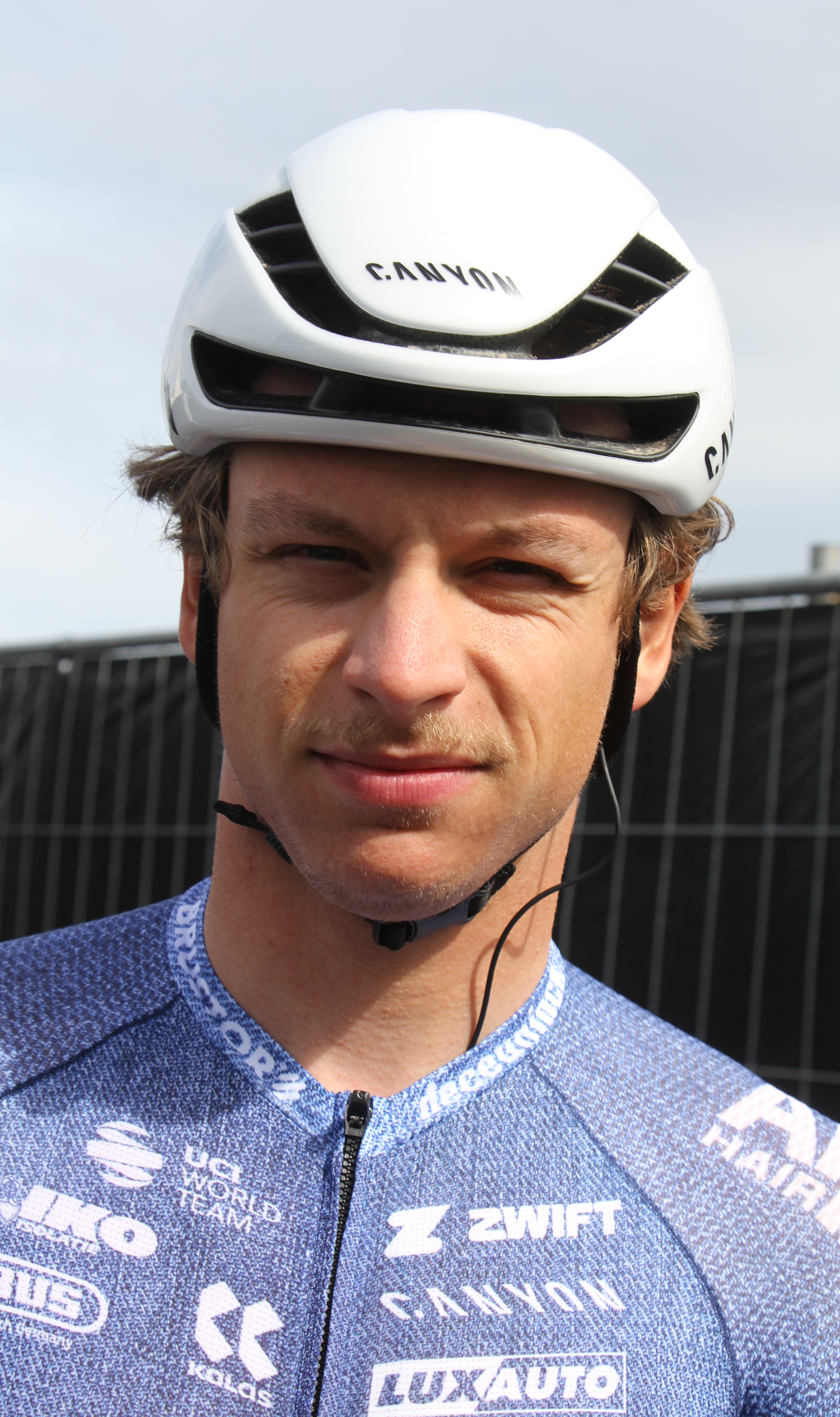
- Lars Boven (2024)

Personal information
- Born: 13 August 2001 (age 25) Reutum, Tubbergen
- Height: 1.72 m (5 ft 8 in)
- Weight: 62 kg (137 lb)

Cycling career
- Sport: Cycling
- Current team: Alpecin–Premier Tech
- Discipline: Road
- Role: Rider

Amateur team
- 2014–2019: AWV de Zwaluwen

Professional teams
- 2020–2023: Jumbo–Visma Development Team
- 2024–: Alpecin–Deceuninck
Medal record
Cycling
Representing Netherlands
European Road Cycling Championships
Silver medal – second place	2019	Junior Time Trial
Bronze medal – third place	2022	Under-23 Team Relay

Lars Boven (born 13 August 2001) is a Dutch professional racing cyclist, who rides for UCI WorldTeam Alpecin–Premier Tech.

== Biography ==
As a junior, Boven was active in both cyclo-cross and road cycling. In cyclo-cross, he participated in the UCI Cyclo-cross World Cup and UCI Cyclo-cross World Championships without achieving top results. On the road, he drew attention, especially in his second season as a junior. In 2019 he became Dutch Junior Champion in the individual time trial and won the silver medal in the same discipline at the European Championships. In the UCI Junior Nations' Cup, he finished third in the junior race of Paris–Roubaix and second in the general classification of the Tour du Pays de Vaud.

In 2020, Boven joined the Jumbo-Visma Development Team, the development squad for the Jumbo-Visma World Tour team. His father, Jan Boven, works there as a directeur sportif. In September, he won a stage of the Bałtyk–Karkonosze Tour. In the U23 category, he achieved his first success in his first season by winning the third stage of the Bałtyk-Karkonosze Tour. In the 2021 season, he achieved two prologue victories in smaller stage races, before winning the overall classification of the Flanders Tomorrow Tour in the 2022 season. He also won the bronze medal with the national team in the U23 mixed relay at the 2022 UEC European Road Championships. Although Boven was still riding for the development team in 2023, he was already used several times in the UCI WorldTeam, including in the Deutschland Tour 2022 and the Volta a la Comunitat Valenciana 2023.

After four years in the Jumbo-Visma Development Team, Boven was not taken over into their elite team. However, for the 2024 season he received a professional contract with the UCI WorldTeam Alpecin-Deceuninck. The best result in his debut season as a professional cyclist was a third place in a stage of the 2024 Tour Down Under.

== Major results ==
2018
1st Stage 1 (TTT) Tour du Pays de Vaud
1st Junior Cycling Tour Assen
2019
1st Time trial, National Junior Road Championships
1st Stage 4 Acht van Bladel (Individual time trial)
2nd Time trial, UEC European Junior Road Championships
2nd Overall Tour du Pays de Vaud
2nd Classique des Alpes
3rd Paris–Roubaix Juniors
4th EPZ Omloop van Borsele
7th Time trial, UCI Junior Road World Championships
2020
1st Stage 3 Bałtyk–Karkonosze Tour
2021
1st Prologue Istrian Spring Trophy
1st Prologue (TTT) Tour Alsace (Loe van Belle and Johannes Staune-Mittet)
4th Time trial, National Under-23 Road Championships
7th Overall Flanders Tomorrow Tour
2022
1st Overall Flanders Tomorrow Tour

1st Points classification
1st Stage 2

1st Stage 2a (TTT), Ronde de l'Isard
3rd Team relay, UEC European Under-23 Road Championships
6th Gran Premio di Poggiana
8th Overall Tour Alsace
2023
2nd Grand Prix Cerami
4th Super 8 Classic
4th Paris-Roubaix Espoirs
6th Liège–Bastogne–Liège Espoirs
7th Overall Olympia's Tour

1st Points classification

2024
4th Figueira Champions Classic

== Cyclo-cross ==
2018–2019
1st Trophy des AP Assurances Juniors #5, Antwerp
2nd National Junior Championships
