= Jed Smithson =

British cyclist (born 2005)

Personal information
- Born: 19 August 2005 (age 21) Oxford, England
- Height: 1.8 m (5 ft 11 in)

Cycling career
- Sport: Cycling
- Current team: Visma–Lease a Bike Development
- Discipline: Road
- Role: Rider

Amateur team
- 2022–2023: Fensham Howes–MAS Design

Professional team
- 2024–2025: Visma–Lease a Bike Development

Jed Smithson (born 19 August 2005) is a British professional cyclist who rode for Visma–Lease a Bike Development in 2024 and 2025 and UCI Continental team Hagens Berman Jayco for the 2026 season.

== Career ==
In 2023, he rode for British-based Fensham Howes-MAS Design team. That year, Smithson won the junior Danilith Nokere Koerse race. He signed for Visma–Lease a Bike Development ahead of the 2024 season, alongside compatriots Matthew Brennan and Tomos Pattinson. He won a stage and the points classification in the 2025 Tour of South Bohemia. He also finished in the top 10 five times in the Tour de Bretagne. He also made several appearances for the elite team and competed in the 2025 Tour of Denmark and the 2025 Super 8 Classic.

He signed for UCI Continental team Hagens Berman Jayco ahead of the 2026 season.

Ahead of the 2027 season, he signed for UCI WorldTeam Team Jayco-AlUla.

== Major results ==
=== Road ===
2022
1st Trofee van Vlaanderen
3rd Gent–Wevelgem Juniors
5th Road race, National Junior Championships
5th Guido Reybrouck Classic
10th Nokere Koerse Juniors
2023
1st Nokere Koerse Juniors
Grand Prix Rüebliland

1st Points classification
1st Stage 1

1st Stage 3 Junior Tour of Wales
2nd Grand Prix Bob Jungels
5th Gent–Wevelgem Junioren
5th Kuurne–Brussels–Kuurne Juniors
2025
Okolo Jižních Čech

1st Points classification
1st Stage 1

4th Youngster Coast Challenge
5th Trofej Umag
5th Grand Prix Cerami
9th Overall Tour de Bretagne
9th Poreč Trophy

=== Track ===
2022
UEC European Junior Championships

2nd Elimination
2nd Individual pursuit
3rd Scratch

2nd Madison, National Junior Championships (with Ben Wiggins)
3rd Team pursuit, National Championships
2023
2nd Team pursuit, UEC European Junior Championships
2024
3rd Team pursuit, National Championships
