= Loe van Belle =

Dutch racing cyclist

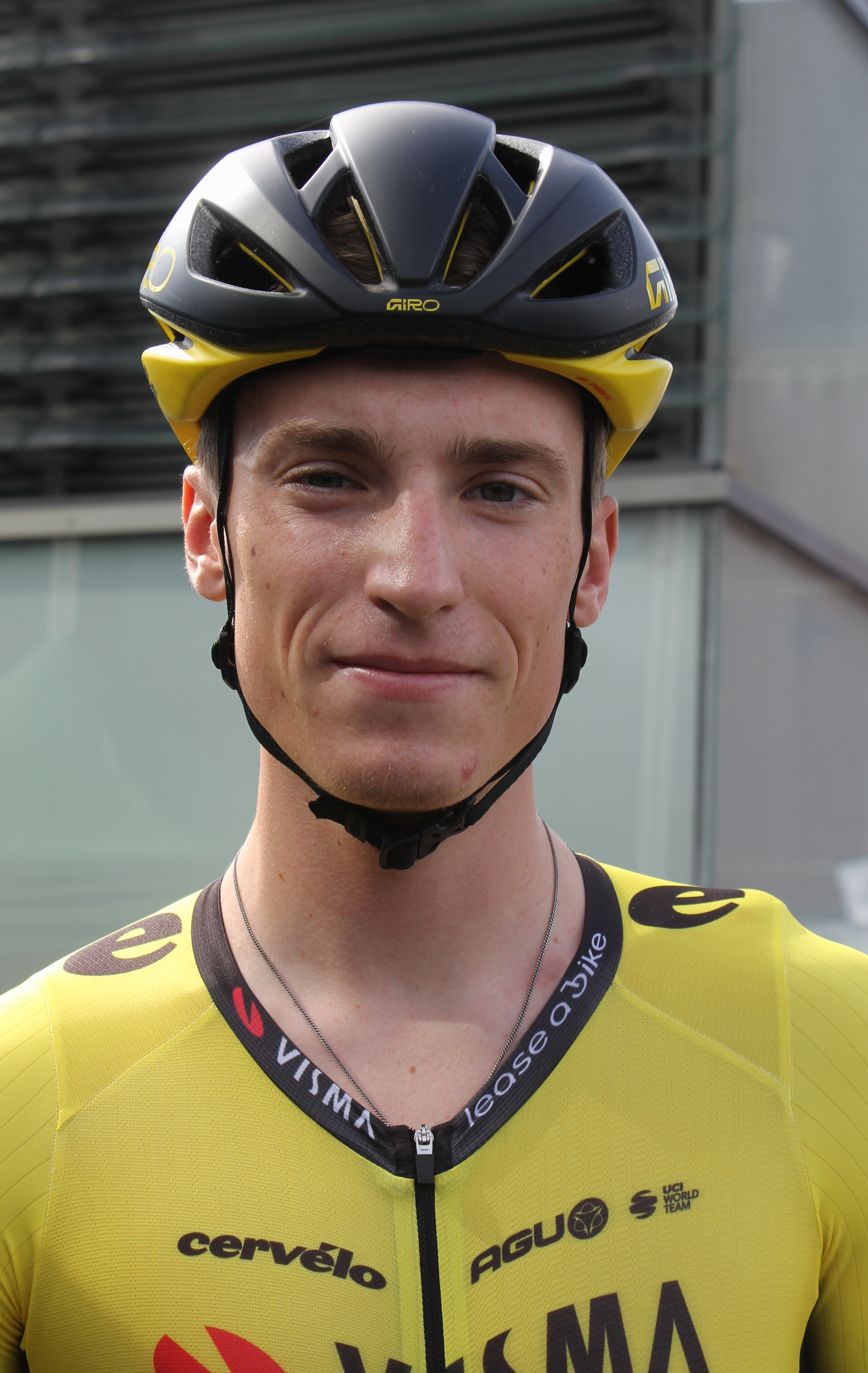
- Loe van Belle (2024)

Personal information
- Full name: Loe van Belle
- Born: 24 January 2002 (age 24) Zoetermeer, Netherlands
- Height: 1.84 m (6 ft 1/2 in)

Cycling career
- Sport: Cycling
- Current team: Visma–Lease a Bike
- Discipline: Road
- Role: Rider

Professional teams
- 2021–2023: Jumbo–Visma Development Team
- 2024–: Visma–Lease a Bike

Loe van Belle (born 24 January 2002) is a Dutch professional racing cyclist, who currently rides for UCI WorldTeam Visma–Lease a Bike.

In September 2022, Team Jumbo–Visma announced that van Belle would continue to compete for Jumbo-Visma Development Team until the end of 2023 and from 2024 onwards switch to the World Tour team for the following 2 years.

His sister Lisa is also a professional cyclist.

== Major results ==
=== Road ===
2019
2nd Omloop der Vlaamse Gewesten
9th Danilith Nokere Koerse Juniors
9th Overall Oberösterreich Juniorenrundfahrt
10th Kuurne–Brussels–Kuurne Juniors
10th Overall SPIE Internationale Juniorendriedaagse
2020
1st Time trial, National Junior Championships
2021
Flanders Tomorrow Tour

1st Sprints classification
1st Stage 1

1st Stage 2 Tour du Pays de Montbéliard
1st Prologue (TTT) Tour Alsace
10th Coppa della Pace
2022
2nd Road race, National Under-23 Championships
9th Overall Tour de l'Avenir

1st Prologue (TTT)

9th Overall Tour de Bretagne
2023
3rd Giro del Belvedere
3rd Ster van Zwolle
2024
9th Rund um Köln

=== Track ===
2019
National Junior Championships

1st Omnium
1st Individual pursuit
2nd Points race
3rd Team pursuit

2020
UEC European Junior Championships

1st Scratch
1st Omnium
