= Team Jumbo–Visma =

Team Jumbo–Visma is a name previously used for:

- Visma–Lease a Bike (men's team), a professional cycling team that competes on the UCI World Tour
- Visma–Lease a Bike (women's team), a professional cycling team that competes on the UCI Women's World Tour
- Visma–Lease a Bike Development, a developmental cycling team that started competing from the 2020 season
