= Michel Hessmann =

German cyclist (born 2001)

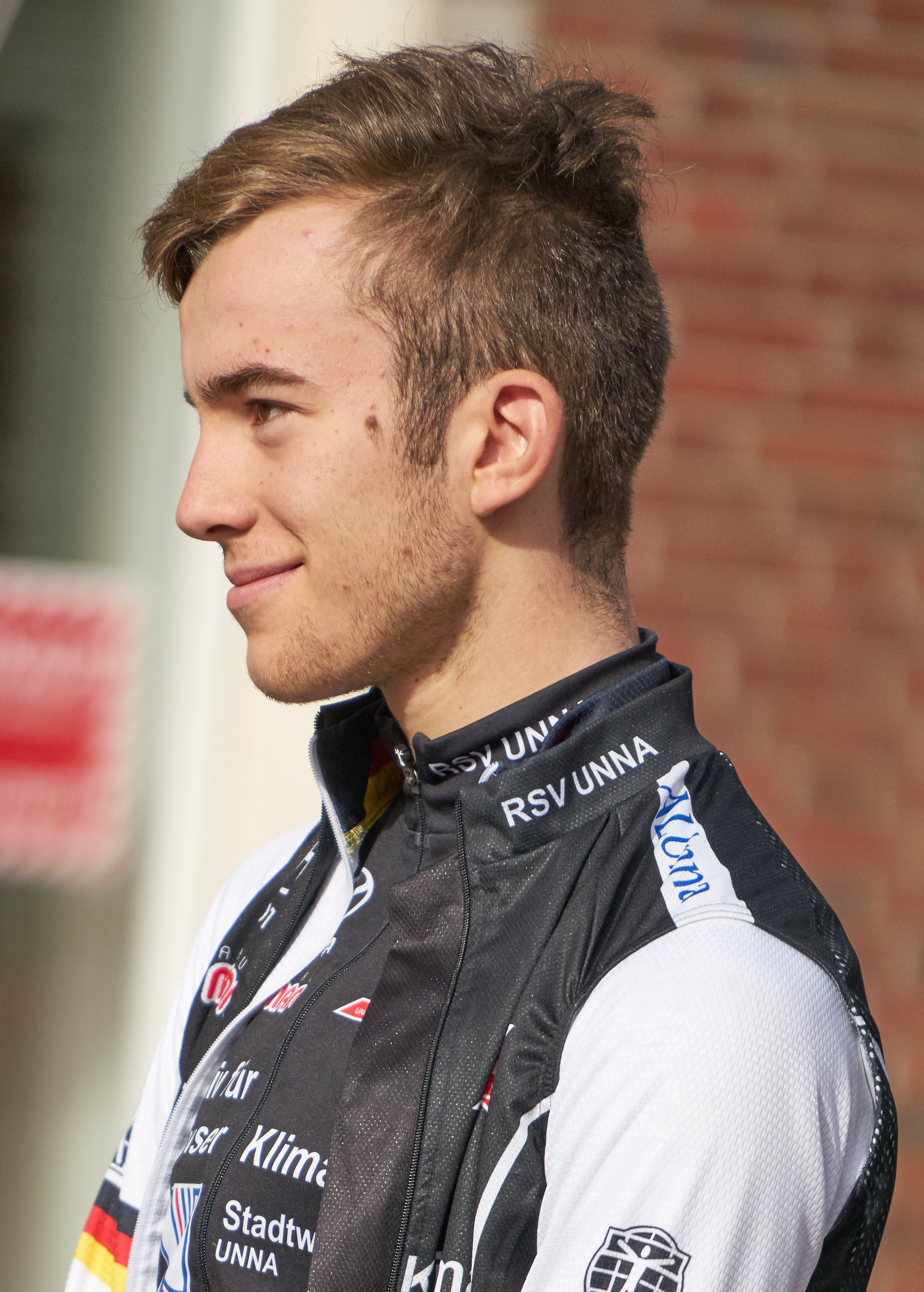
- Hessmann in 2018

Personal information
- Full name: Michel Hessmann
- Born: 6 April 2001 (age 25) Münster, Germany
- Height: 1.90 m (6 ft 3 in)
- Weight: 78 kg (172 lb)

Cycling career
- Sport: Cycling
- Current team: Movistar Team
- Discipline: Road
- Role: Rider

Amateur teams
- 2012–2015: RSV Coesfeld
- 2016–2019: RSV Unna 1968
- 2018–2019: ROSE Team NRW

Professional teams
- 2020–2021: Jumbo–Visma Development Team
- 2020: Team Jumbo–Visma (development) (Note: Hessmann competed at the 2020 Czech Cycling Tour with Team Jumbo–Visma, following the introduction of a UCI rule allowing riders registered with a development team to participate in UCI ProSeries or Class 1 events.)
- 2022–2024: Team Jumbo–Visma
- 2025–: Movistar Team

Michel Hessmann (born 6 April 2001) is a German professional racing cyclist, who currently rides for UCI WorldTeam Movistar Team.

He was suspended by his team, Team Jumbo–Visma, on 16 August 2023, following a positive out-of-competition doping test for an unnamed diuretic.

== Major results ==
2018
1st Time trial, National Junior Road Championships
4th Time trial, UCI Junior Road World Championships
4th Time trial, UEC European Junior Road Championships
4th Johan Museeuw Classic
6th Overall Trophée Centre Morbihan
7th Overall Saarland Trofeo
9th Overall Giro della Lunigiana

1st Young rider classification

2019
1st Overall Trophée Centre Morbihan

1st Stage 2 (ITT)

National Junior Road Championships

2nd Time trial
2nd Road race

4th Overall Course de la Paix Juniors
5th Time trial, UCI Junior Road World Championships
5th Overall Giro della Lunigiana
5th GP Luxembourg
7th Trofeo Emilio Paganessi
2020
1st National Under-23 XC MTB Championships
UEC European Road Championships

1st Team relay
6th Under-23 time trial

10th Overall Müller - Die lila Logistik Rad-Bundesliga

1st Ilsfeld-Auenstein

2021
National Under-23 Road Championships

1st Time trial
2nd Road race

1st Mountains classification, Grand Prix Priessnitz spa
3rd Overall Kreiz Breizh Elites

1st Stage 1 (TTT)

4th Time trial, UEC European Under-23 Road Championships
7th Giro del Belvedere
8th Overall Orlen Nations Grand Prix
8th Time trial, UCI Road World Under-23 Championships
10th Ster van Zwolle
2022
3rd Overall Tour de l'Avenir

1st Stage 5 (TTT)

5th Time trial, UCI Road World Under-23 Championships

=== Grand Tour general classification results timeline ===
Grand Tour	2023
Giro d'Italia	33
Tour de France	–
Vuelta a España	–
