= Jasper Schoofs =

Belgian cyclist

Personal information
- Born: 30 March 2006 (age 20)
- Height: 1.86 m (6 ft 1 in)
- Weight: 68 kg (150 lb)

Cycling career
- Sport: Cycling
- Current team: Soudal–Quick-Step Devo Team
- Disciplines: Road; Cyclo-cross
- Role: Rider

Amateur team
- 2023–2024: Acrog–Tormans

Professional team
- 2025–: Soudal–Quick-Step Devo Team
Medal record
Men's road cycling
Representing Belgium
World Championships
Silver medal – second place	2024 Zurich	Junior time trial
European Championships
Silver medal – second place	2024 Limburg	Junior time trial

Jasper Schoofs (born 30 March 2006) is a Belgian professional racing cyclist, who currently rides for UCI Continental team Soudal–Quick-Step Devo Team.

== Career ==
From the Campine region of Belgium, he began racing at the age of ten years-old having also participated in judo, breakdance, and running. He was Belgian age-group time trial champion in 2021 and 2022. In 2021, he won a stage in the Triptyque Ardennais and won a hilly race in Herbeumont, Luxembourg. That winter, he was on the podium at the Belgian National Cyclo-cross Championships in Middelkerke. In 2022, he won the Pévèle Classic in France.

In 2024, he placed second in the junior time trial at both the European and World Junior Championships, and began riding for Soudal–Quick-Step Devo Team the following year, making his debut in a professional race debut in France at La Roue Tourangelle. He had first joined the team in a training camp in December 2023.

In 2026, he was a stage winner and a pink jersey holder at the Giro Next Gen. In August, he was active at the 2026 Tour de l'Avenir stage race, finishing runner-up on the queen mountain stage to Kasper Borremans.

== Major results ==
2023
1st Overall Vuelta al Besaya

1st Points classification
1st Young rider classification
1st Stages 1 & 3 (TTT)

1st Stage 2a (TTT) Aubel–Thimister–Stavelot
2nd Time trial, National Junior Road Championships
4th Overall Gipuzkoa Klasikoa

1st Stage 1

2024
1st Overall Saarland Trofeo
1st Pévèle Classics
1st Romsée–Stavelot–Romsée
1st Stage 2a (TTT) Aubel–Thimister–Stavelot
2nd Time trial, UCI Junior Road World Championships
2nd Time trial, European Junior Road Championships
National Junior Road Championships

2nd Road race
2nd Time trial

2nd Overall Oberösterreich Juniorenrundfahrt
3rd Overall Vuelta al Besaya

1st Stage 3

3rd E3 Saxo Classic Juniors
4th Overall La Philippe Gilbert Juniors

1st Stage 1

4th Gent–Wevelgem Juniors
6th Overall Trophée Centre Morbihan
6th Overall Ain Bugey Valromey Tour
6th Paris–Roubaix Juniors
2025
1st Mountains classification, Tour Alsace
9th Overall Giro della Valle d'Aosta
2026
1st Stage 3 Giro Next Gen
2nd Time trial, National Under-23 Road Championships
6th Paris–Roubaix Espoirs
9th Overall Tour de l'Avenir
