= Maurice Ballerstedt =

German cyclist (born 2001)

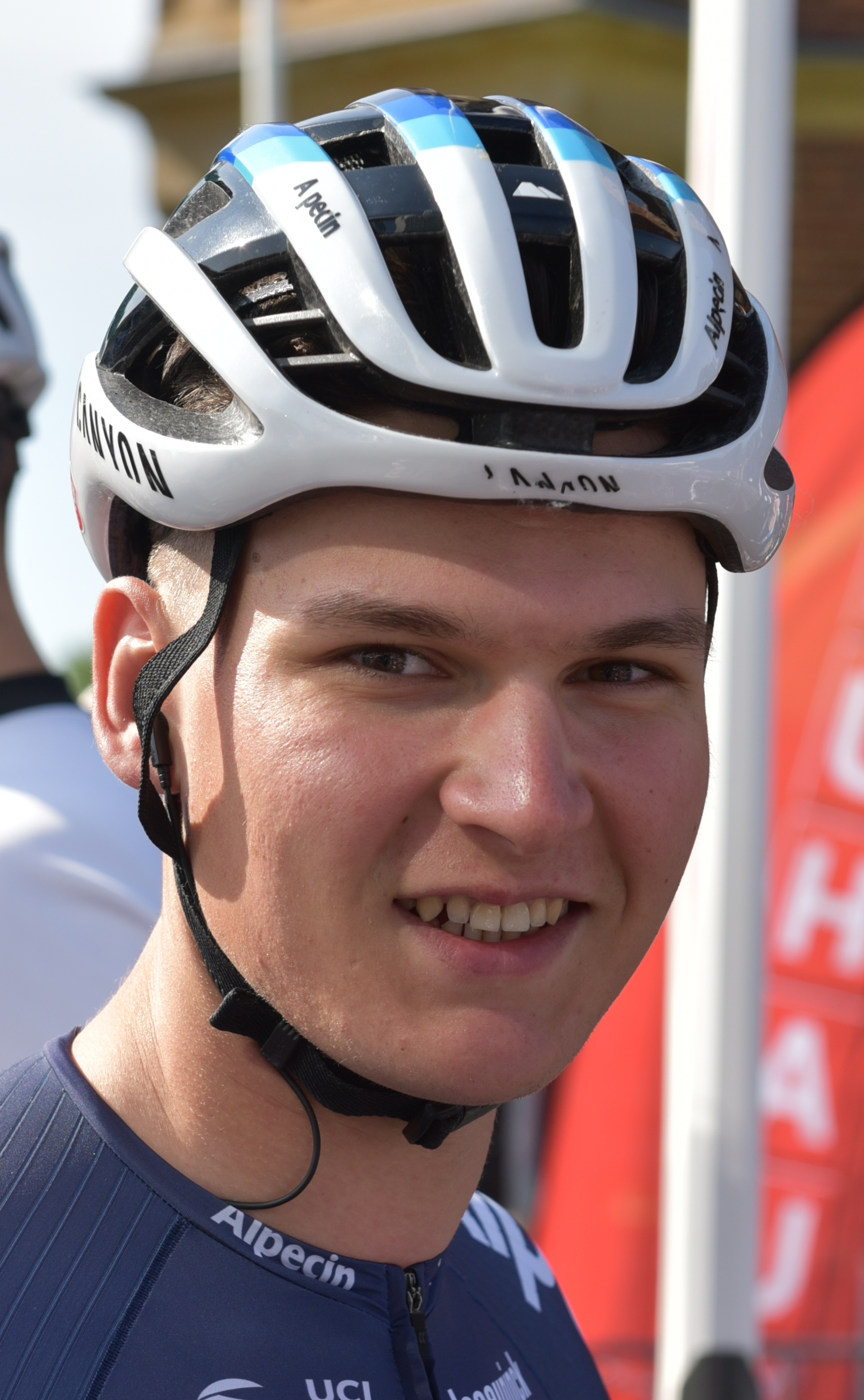
- Ballerstedt in 2022

Personal information
- Full name: Maurice Ballerstedt
- Born: 16 January 2001 (age 25) Berlin, Germany
- Height: 1.86 m (6 ft 1 in)
- Weight: 74 kg (163 lb)

Cycling career
- Sport: Cycling
- Discipline: Road
- Role: Rider

Amateur teams
- 2010–2014: RSV Blankenfelde
- 2015–2019: SC Berlin
- 2018: LV Berlin

Professional teams
- 2020–2021: Jumbo–Visma Development Team
- 2022–2024: Alpecin–Fenix
- 2026-: Alpecin–Premier Tech
Medal record
Representing Germany
Men's road bicycle racing
European Championships
Gold medal – first place	2022 Anadia	Under-23 team time trial
Silver medal – second place	2019 Alkmaar	Junior time trial

Maurice Ballerstedt (born 16 January 2001) is a German professional racing cyclist, who last rode for UCI WorldTeam Alpecin–Deceuninck.

== Biography ==
Ballerstedt emerged as a strong junior rider in 2019, his second year in the junior ranks (under-19). He finished second overall in the Course de la Paix Juniors, and third in both the Saarland Trofeo and the Grand Prix Général Patton, all events in the UCI Junior Nations' Cup. In August, despite back pain, he won the silver medal in the European Junior Road Championships time trial, finishing behind solo winner Andrii Ponomar.

In 2020 and 2021, he rode as an under-23 rider for the Jumbo–Visma Development Team. In 2021, he won the general classification of the Tour du Pays de Montbéliard after winning the final stage. He also finished second in the German Under-23 National Time Trial Championships and tenth in the European Under-23 Time Trial Championships.

Ballerstedt turned professional with UCI ProTeam Alpecin–Fenix in 2022, signing a contract through 2024. In his first season as a professional, he won the German Under-23 National Time Trial Championships. He was also part of the German team that won the mixed relay at the 2022 European Road Championships.

== Major results ==
2018
3rd Overall Internationale Cottbuser Junioren-Etappenfahrt
2019
1st GP Luxembourg
UEC European Junior Road Championships

2nd Time trial
9th Road race

2nd Overall Course de la Paix Juniors
3rd Overall LVM Saarland Trofeo

1st Stage 3b (TTT)

3rd GP Général Patton
10th Gent–Wevelgem Juniors
2020
8th Overall Orlen Nations Grand Prix
2021
1st Overall Tour du Pays de Montbéliard

1st Young rider classification
1st Stage 3

1st Stage 1 (TTT) Kreiz Breizh Elites
National Under-23 Road Championships

2nd Time trial
5th Road race

8th Egmont Cycling Race
10th Time trial, UEC European Under-23 Road Championships
2022
UEC European Under-23 Road Championships

1st Team relay
9th Road race

National Under-23 Road Championships

1st Time trial
5th Road race

2023
8th Elfstedenronde
2024
2nd Ronde van Limburg

=== Grand Tour general classification results timeline ===
Grand Tour	2023	2024
Giro d'Italia	—	—
Tour de France	—	—
Vuelta a España	143	126

Legend
—	Did not compete
DNF	Did not finish
