= Jonas Kind Høydahl =

Norwegian cyclist (born 2005)

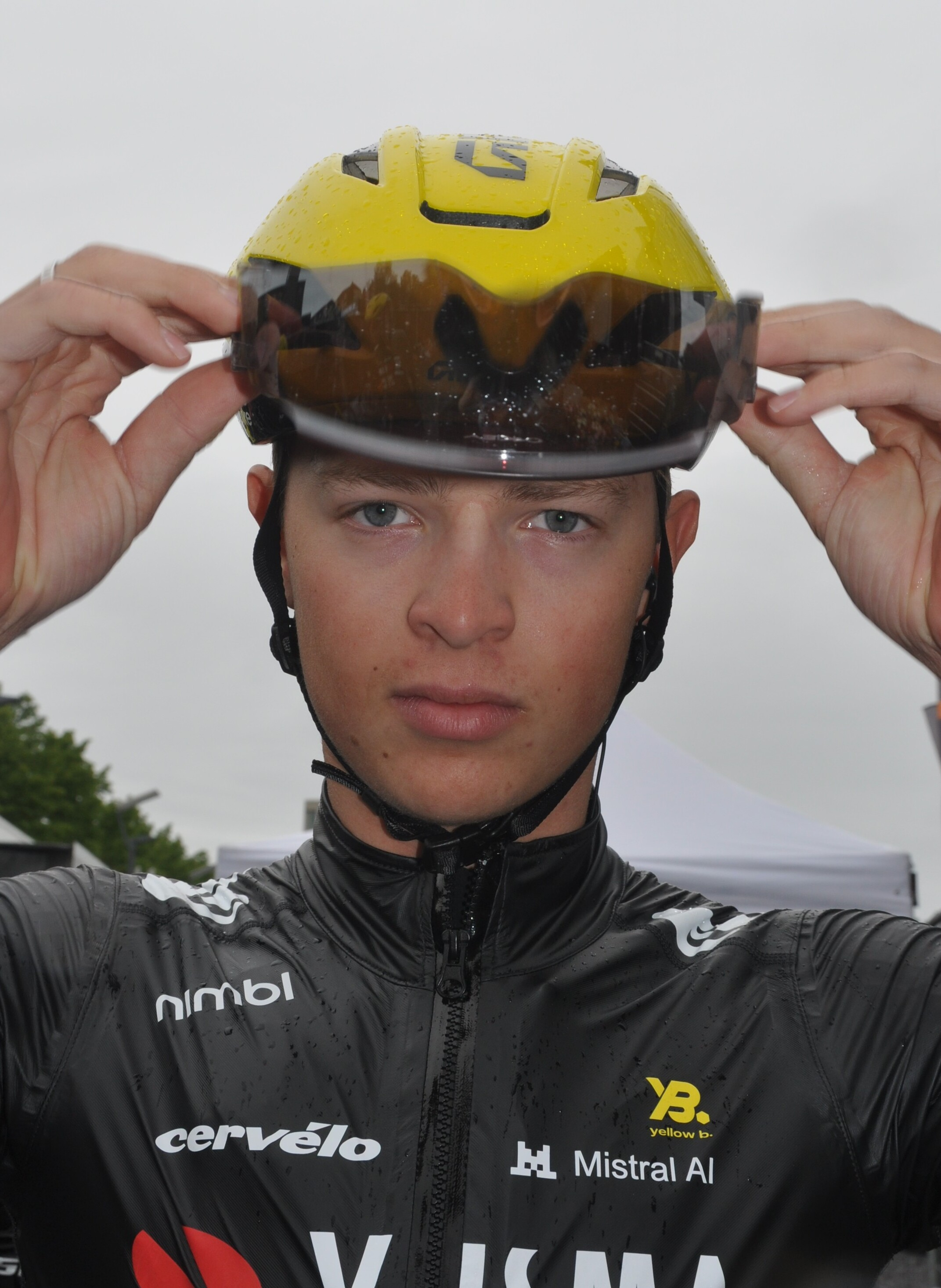
- Høydahl at the 2026 Rund um Köln

Personal information
- Born: 19 December 2005 (age 20) Sande, Norway
- Height: 1.83 m (6 ft 0 in)
- Weight: 67 kg (148 lb)

Cycling career
- Sport: Cycling
- Current team: Visma–Lease a Bike Development
- Discipline: Road
- Role: Rider

Professional team
- 2024–: Visma–Lease a Bike Development

Jonas Kind Høydahl (born 19 December 2005) is a Norwegian professional cyclist who rides for Visma–Lease a Bike Development.

== Career ==
As a child he took part in many sports such as gymnastics, cross-country skiing and handball. Initially a mountain biker and cyclo-cross rider, he made his debut in a road race in 2022 at the Tour te Fjells.

He joined Visma–Lease a Bike Development in 2023 ahead of the 2024 season, agreeing a two-year contract. He extended his contract with the team ahead of the 2026 season.

== Personal life ==
From Sande in Vestfold, he is the son of Norwegian cyclist Rune Høydahl.

== Major results ==
2026
4th Overall Oberösterreich Rundfahrt
