= Matisse Van Kerckhove =

Belgian cyclist

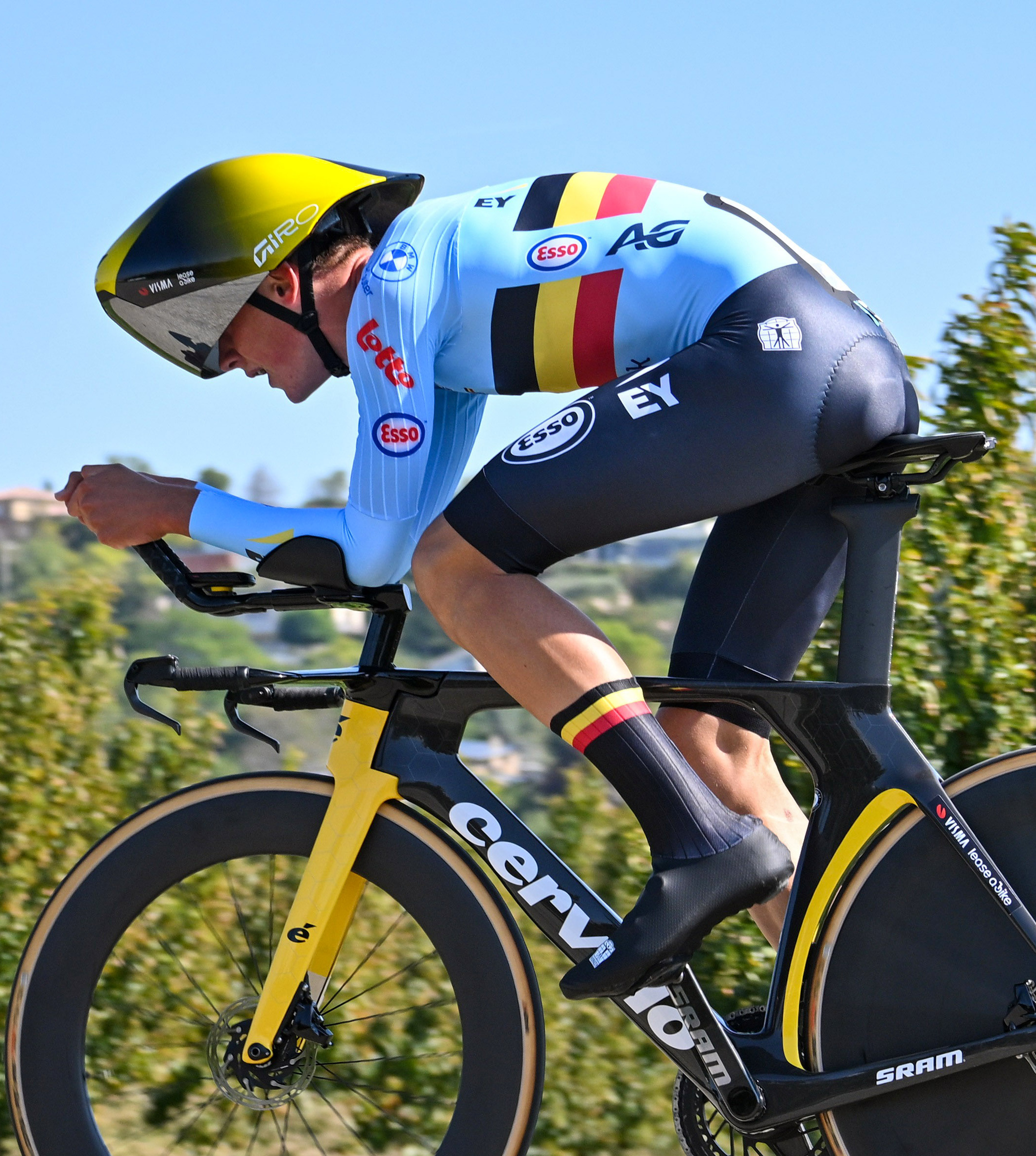
- Van Kerckhove in 2025

Personal information
- Born: 11 September 2006 (age 20) Antwerp, Belgium
- Height: 1.85 m (6 ft 1 in)
- Weight: 70 kg (154 lb)

Cycling career
- Sport: Cycling
- Current team: Visma–Lease a Bike Development
- Discipline: Road
- Role: Rider

Amateur teams
- 2023: Penya Ciclista Baix Ebre
- 2024: Crabbé–Dstny Juniors

Professional team
- 2025–2026: Visma–Lease a Bike Development
Medal record
Men's road cycling
Representing Belgium
World Championships
Bronze medal – third place	2024 Zurich	Junior time trial
European Championships
Silver medal – second place	2025 Guilherand-Granges	Under-23 time trial
Silver medal – second place	2026 Ljubljana	Under-23 time trial

Matisse Van Kerckhove (born 11 September 2006) is a Belgian cyclist, who currently rides for UCI Continental team Visma–Lease a Bike Development. In 2027, he will join UCI WorldTeam Visma–Lease a Bike on a two-year contract.

His younger brother Seff is also a cyclist.

== Major results ==
2024
1st Stage 2a (ITT) Ronde des Vallées
3rd Time trial, UCI Junior Road World Championships
3rd Time trial, National Junior Road Championships
6th Time trial, UEC European Junior Road Championships
2025
2nd Time trial, UEC European Under-23 Road Championships
2nd Time trial, National Under-23 Road Championships
5th Giro del Belvedere
6th Flèche Ardennaise
9th G.P. Palio del Recioto
10th Overall Grand Prix Jeseníky
10th Gent–Wevelgem Beloften
2026 (2 pro wins)
1st Time trial, National Under-23 Road Championships
1st Overall Flèche du Sud

1st Young rider classification
1st Stage 3

1st Overall Alpes Isère Tour

1st Points classification
1st Young rider classification
1st Stage 1

1st Overall Istrian Spring Tour

1st Mountains classification
1st Stage 2

1st Chrono Challenge Borlo
1st Stage 5 Giro Next Gen
4th Liège–Bastogne–Liège Espoirs
