= Visma–Lease a Bike =

Team Visma–Lease a Bike may refer to:

- Team Visma–Lease a Bike (men's team), a professional cycling team that competes on the UCI World Tour
- Team Visma–Lease a Bike (women's team), a professional cycling team that competes on the UCI Women's World Tour
- Team Visma–Lease a Bike Development, a developmental cycling team that started competing from the 2020 season
