= 2020 Settimana Internazionale di Coppi e Bartali =

Italian cycling race

2020 UCI Europe Tour

Race details
- Dates: 1–4 September 2020 (Note: The race was originally scheduled for 25 to 29 March, but due to the COVID-19 pandemic, it was initially cancelled before it was postponed to the beginning of September.)
- Stages: 4, including one split stage
- Distance: 612.7 km (380.7 mi)
- Winning time: 15h 15' 54"

Results
Jersey awarded to the overall winner	Winner	Jhonatan Narváez (ECU)	(Ineos Grenadiers)
	Second	Andrea Bagioli (ITA)	(Deceuninck–Quick-Step)
	Third	João Almeida (POR)	(Deceuninck–Quick-Step)
Jersey awarded to the points classification winner	Points	Jhonatan Narváez (ECU)	(Ineos Grenadiers)
Jersey awarded to the mountains classification winner	Mountains	Julen Amezqueta (ESP)	(Caja Rural–Seguros RGA)
Jersey awarded to the youth classification winner	Youth	Jhonatan Narváez (ECU)	(Ineos Grenadiers)
	Team	Astana	

The 2020 Settimana Internazionale di Coppi e Bartali was a road cycling stage race that took place between 1 and 4 September 2020 in the Italian region of Emilia-Romagna. It was the 35th edition of the Settimana Internazionale di Coppi e Bartali and was part of the 2020 UCI Europe Tour as a category 2.1 event.

The race was originally scheduled to be held from 25 to 29 March, but the COVID-19 pandemic forced its cancellation. However, in May, with the new UCI post-lockdown racing calendar, the race was rescheduled for 1 to 4 September.

== Teams ==
Nine UCI WorldTeams, eleven UCI ProTeams, and eight UCI Continental teams made up the twenty-eight teams that participated in the race. Of these teams, Giotti Victoria, with five riders, was the only one to not enter the maximum allowed of six riders. 117 of the 167 riders to start the race finished.

UCI WorldTeams

- Astana
- Bahrain–McLaren
- Bora–Hansgrohe
- Deceuninck–Quick-Step
- Ineos Grenadiers
- Movistar Team
- NTT Pro Cycling
- Trek–Segafredo
- UAE Team Emirates

UCI ProTeams

- Alpecin–Fenix
- Androni Giocattoli–Sidermec
- Bardiani–CSF–Faizanè
- Bingoal–Wallonie Bruxelles
- Burgos BH
- Caja Rural–Seguros RGA
- Circus–Wanty Gobert
- Gazprom–RusVelo
- Nippo–Delko–One Provence
- Rally Cycling
- Vini Zabù–KTM

UCI Continental Teams

- Beltrami TSA–Marchiol
- Colombia Tierra de Atletas–GW Bicicletas
- General Store–Essegibi–Fratelli Curia
- Giotti Victoria
- Jumbo–Visma Development Team
- Efapel
- Team Colpack–Ballan
- Work Service–Dinatek–Vega

== Route ==
Stage characteristics and winners
Stage	Date	Route	Distance	Type	Winner
1a	1 September	Gatteo to Gatteo	97.8 km (60.8 mi)	Flat stage	Olav Kooij (NED)
1b	1 September	Gatteo to Gatteo	13.3 km (8.3 mi)	Team time trial	Deceuninck–Quick-Step
2	2 September	Riccione to Sogliano al Rubicone	166.5 km (103.5 mi)	Hilly stage	Andrea Bagioli (ITA)
3	3 September	Riccione to Riccione	168.9 km (104.9 mi)	Medium mountain stage	Jhonatan Narváez (ECU)
4	4 September	Forlì to Forlì	166.2 km (103.3 mi)	Hilly stage	Pascal Eenkhoorn (NED)
Total			612.7 km (380.7 mi)		

== Stages ==
=== Stage 1a ===
1 September 2020 — Gatteo to Gatteo, 97.8 km (60.8 mi)

Stage 1a Result
Rank	Rider	Team	Time
1	Olav Kooij (NED)	Jumbo–Visma Development Team	2h 08' 26"
2	Ethan Hayter (GBR)	Ineos Grenadiers	+ 0"
3	Phil Bauhaus (GER)	Bahrain–McLaren	+ 0"
4	Gianni Vermeersch (BEL)	Alpecin–Fenix	+ 0"
5	Davide Persico (ITA)	Team Colpack–Ballan	+ 0"
6	Andrea Pasqualon (ITA)	Circus–Wanty Gobert	+ 0"
7	Francesco Di Felice (ITA)	Efapel	+ 0"
8	Jempy Drucker (LUX)	Bora–Hansgrohe	+ 0"
9	Biniam Girmay (ERI)	Nippo–Delko–One Provence	+ 0"
10	Alex Molenaar (NED)	Burgos BH	+ 0"

General classification after Stage 1a
Rank	Rider	Team	Time
1	Olav Kooij (NED)	Jumbo–Visma Development Team	2h 08' 20"
2	Ethan Hayter (GBR)	Ineos Grenadiers	+ 2"
3	Phil Bauhaus (GER)	Bahrain–McLaren	+ 4"
4	Gianni Vermeersch (BEL)	Alpecin–Fenix	+ 6"
5	Davide Persico (ITA)	Team Colpack–Ballan	+ 6"
6	Andrea Pasqualon (ITA)	Circus–Wanty Gobert	+ 6"
7	Francesco Di Felice (ITA)	Efapel	+ 6"
8	Jempy Drucker (LUX)	Bora–Hansgrohe	+ 6"
9	Biniam Girmay (ERI)	Nippo–Delko–One Provence	+ 6"
10	Alex Molenaar (NED)	Burgos BH	+ 6"

=== Stage 1b ===
1 September 2020 — Gatteo to Gatteo, 13.3 km (8.3 mi) (TTT)

Stage 1b Result
Rank	Team	Time
1	Deceuninck–Quick-Step	14' 32"
2	Ineos Grenadiers	+ 8"
3	Bora–Hansgrohe	+ 11"
4	NTT Pro Cycling	+ 14"
5	Jumbo–Visma Development Team	+ 17"
6	Movistar Team	+ 18"
7	Astana	+ 18"
8	UAE Team Emirates	+ 19"
9	Bahrain–McLaren	+ 19"
10	Trek–Segafredo	+ 22"

General classification after Stage 1b
Rank	Rider	Team	Time
1	Mikkel Frølich Honoré (DEN)	Deceuninck–Quick-Step	2h 22' 58"
2	James Knox (GBR)	Deceuninck–Quick-Step	+ 0"
3	João Almeida (POR)	Deceuninck–Quick-Step	+ 0"
4	Andrea Bagioli (ITA)	Deceuninck–Quick-Step	+ 0"
5	Pieter Serry (BEL)	Deceuninck–Quick-Step	+ 0"
6	Mauri Vansevenant (BEL)	Deceuninck–Quick-Step	+ 3"
7	Ethan Hayter (GBR)	Ineos Grenadiers	+ 4"
8	Jhonatan Narváez (ECU)	Ineos Grenadiers	+ 8"
9	Brandon Rivera (COL)	Ineos Grenadiers	+ 8"
10	Owain Doull (GBR)	Ineos Grenadiers	+ 8"

=== Stage 2 ===
2 September 2020 — Riccione to Sogliano al Rubicone, 166.5 km (103.5 mi)

Stage 2 Result
Rank	Rider	Team	Time
1	Andrea Bagioli (ITA)	Deceuninck–Quick-Step	4h 21' 58"
2	Jhonatan Narváez (ECU)	Ineos Grenadiers	+ 1"
3	Nicola Conci (ITA)	Trek–Segafredo	+ 1"
4	Diego Ulissi (ITA)	UAE Team Emirates	+ 1"
5	Mauro Finetto (ITA)	Nippo–Delko–One Provence	+ 6"
6	João Almeida (POR)	Deceuninck–Quick-Step	+ 6"
7	Jacopo Mosca (ITA)	Trek–Segafredo	+ 9"
8	Jan Bakelants (BEL)	Circus–Wanty Gobert	+ 9"
9	Gavin Mannion (USA)	Rally Cycling	+ 9"
10	Luca Wackermann (ITA)	Vini Zabù–KTM	+ 9"

General classification after Stage 2
Rank	Rider	Team	Time
1	Andrea Bagioli (ITA)	Deceuninck–Quick-Step	6h 44' 46"
2	Jhonatan Narváez (ECU)	Ineos Grenadiers	+ 13"
3	João Almeida (POR)	Deceuninck–Quick-Step	+ 16"
4	Nicola Conci (ITA)	Trek–Segafredo	+ 29"
5	Diego Ulissi (ITA)	UAE Team Emirates	+ 30"
6	James Knox (GBR)	Deceuninck–Quick-Step	+ 30"
7	Iván Sosa (COL)	Ineos Grenadiers	+ 34"
8	Jacopo Mosca (ITA)	Trek–Segafredo	+ 41"
9	Merhawi Kudus (ERI)	Astana	+ 42"
10	Mauro Finetto (ITA)	Nippo–Delko–One Provence	+ 46"

=== Stage 3 ===
3 September 2020 — Riccione to Riccione, 168.9 km (104.9 mi)

Stage 3 Result
Rank	Rider	Team	Time
1	Jhonatan Narváez (ECU)	Ineos Grenadiers	4h 37' 04"
2	Pascal Eenkhoorn (NED)	Jumbo–Visma Development Team	+ 0"
3	Biniam Girmay (ERI)	Nippo–Delko–One Provence	+ 0"
4	Jacopo Mosca (ITA)	Trek–Segafredo	+ 0"
5	Ethan Hayter (GBR)	Ineos Grenadiers	+ 0"
6	Fabio Felline (ITA)	Astana	+ 0"
7	Gianni Vermeersch (BEL)	Alpecin–Fenix	+ 0"
8	Nicola Conci (ITA)	Trek–Segafredo	+ 0"
9	Giovanni Visconti (ITA)	Vini Zabù–KTM	+ 0"
10	Alessandro Covi (ITA)	UAE Team Emirates	+ 0"

General classification after Stage 3
Rank	Rider	Team	Time
1	Andrea Bagioli (ITA)	Deceuninck–Quick-Step	11h 21' 50"
2	Jhonatan Narváez (ECU)	Ineos Grenadiers	+ 3"
3	João Almeida (POR)	Deceuninck–Quick-Step	+ 16"
4	Nicola Conci (ITA)	Trek–Segafredo	+ 29"
5	Diego Ulissi (ITA)	UAE Team Emirates	+ 30"
6	Iván Sosa (COL)	Ineos Grenadiers	+ 34"
7	Jacopo Mosca (ITA)	Trek–Segafredo	+ 41"
8	Merhawi Kudus (ERI)	Astana	+ 42"
9	Mauro Finetto (ITA)	Nippo–Delko–One Provence	+ 46"
10	Pascal Eenkhoorn (NED)	Jumbo–Visma Development Team	+ 49"

=== Stage 4 ===
4 September 2020 — Forlì to Forlì, 166.2 km (103.3 mi)

Stage 4 Result
Rank	Rider	Team	Time
1	Pascal Eenkhoorn (NED)	Jumbo–Visma Development Team	3h 54' 05"
2	Diego Ulissi (ITA)	UAE Team Emirates	+ 0"
3	Jhonatan Narváez (ECU)	Ineos Grenadiers	+ 0"
4	Vyacheslav Kuznetsov (RUS)	Gazprom–RusVelo	+ 0"
5	Andrea Pasqualon (ITA)	Circus–Wanty Gobert	+ 0"
6	Gianni Vermeersch (BEL)	Alpecin–Fenix	+ 0"
7	Andrea Bagioli (ITA)	Deceuninck–Quick-Step	+ 0"
8	Giovanni Visconti (ITA)	Vini Zabù–KTM	+ 0"
9	Arjen Livyns (BEL)	Bingoal–Wallonie Bruxelles	+ 0"
10	Gavin Mannion (USA)	Rally Cycling	+ 0"

General classification after Stage 4
Rank	Rider	Team	Time
1	Jhonatan Narváez (ECU)	Ineos Grenadiers	15h 15' 54"
2	Andrea Bagioli (ITA)	Deceuninck–Quick-Step	+ 1"
3	João Almeida (POR)	Deceuninck–Quick-Step	+ 17"
4	Diego Ulissi (ITA)	UAE Team Emirates	+ 25"
5	Nicola Conci (ITA)	Trek–Segafredo	+ 30"
6	Pascal Eenkhoorn (NED)	Jumbo–Visma Development Team	+ 40"
7	Jacopo Mosca (ITA)	Trek–Segafredo	+ 42"
8	Merhawi Kudus (ERI)	Astana	+ 43"
9	Mauro Finetto (ITA)	Nippo–Delko–One Provence	+ 47"
10	Gavin Mannion (USA)	Rally Cycling	+ 53"

== Classification leadership table ==
Classification leadership by stage
Stage	Winner	General classification	Points classification	Mountains classification	Young rider classification	Team classification
1a	Olav Kooij	Olav Kooij	Olav Kooij	Johan Jacobs	Olav Kooij	Ineos Grenadiers
1b	Deceuninck–Quick-Step	Mikkel Frølich Honoré	Olav Kooij	Johan Jacobs	Mikkel Frølich Honoré	Deceuninck–Quick-Step
2	Andrea Bagioli	Andrea Bagioli	Andrea Bagioli	Johan Jacobs	Andrea Bagioli	Deceuninck–Quick-Step
3	Jhonatan Narváez	Andrea Bagioli	Jhonatan Narváez	Julen Amezqueta	Andrea Bagioli	Deceuninck–Quick-Step
4	Pascal Eenkhoorn	Jhonatan Narváez	Jhonatan Narváez	Julen Amezqueta	Jhonatan Narváez	Astana
Final		Jhonatan Narváez	Jhonatan Narváez	Julen Amezqueta	Jhonatan Narváez	Astana

- On stage 1b, Ethan Hayter, who was second in the points classification, wore the red-and-white jersey, because first-placed Olav Kooij wore the white jersey as the leader of the general classification. For the same reason, Davide Persico, who was third in the young rider classification, wore the orange jersey, as Hayter was also second in the young rider classification.
- On stage 2, João Almeida, who was second in the young rider classification, wore the orange jersey, because first-placed Mikkel Frølich Honoré wore the white jersey as the leader of the general classification.
- On stage 3, Olav Kooij, who was second in the points classification, wore the red-and-white jersey, because first-placed Andrea Bagioli wore the white jersey as the leader of the general classification. For the same reason, Jhonatan Narváez, who was second in the young rider classification, wore the orange jersey.
- On stage 4, João Almeida, who was third in the young rider classification, wore the orange jersey, because first-placed Andrea Bagioli wore the white jersey as the leader of the general classification and second-placed Jhonatan Narváez wore the red-and-white jersey as the leader of the points classification.

== Final classification standings ==
Legend
Denotes the winner of the general classification	Denotes the winner of the mountains classification
Denotes the winner of the points classification	Denotes the winner of the young rider classification

=== General classification ===
Final general classification (1–10)
Rank	Rider	Team	Time
1	Jhonatan Narváez (ECU)	Ineos Grenadiers	15h 15' 54"
2	Andrea Bagioli (ITA)	Deceuninck–Quick-Step	+ 1"
3	João Almeida (POR)	Deceuninck–Quick-Step	+ 17"
4	Diego Ulissi (ITA)	UAE Team Emirates	+ 25"
5	Nicola Conci (ITA)	Trek–Segafredo	+ 30"
6	Pascal Eenkhoorn (NED)	Jumbo–Visma Development Team	+ 40"
7	Jacopo Mosca (ITA)	Trek–Segafredo	+ 42"
8	Merhawi Kudus (ERI)	Astana	+ 43"
9	Mauro Finetto (ITA)	Nippo–Delko–One Provence	+ 47"
10	Gavin Mannion (USA)	Rally Cycling	+ 53"

=== Points classification ===
Final points classification (1–10)
Rank	Rider	Team	Points
1	Jhonatan Narváez (ECU)	Ineos Grenadiers	24
2	Pascal Eenkhoorn (NED)	Jumbo–Visma Development Team	18
3	Diego Ulissi (ITA)	UAE Team Emirates	13
4	Andrea Bagioli (ITA)	Deceuninck–Quick-Step	12
5	Ethan Hayter (GBR)	Ineos Grenadiers	12
6	Olav Kooij (NED)	Jumbo–Visma Development Team	10
7	Gianni Vermeersch (BEL)	Alpecin–Fenix	10
8	Nicola Conci (ITA)	Trek–Segafredo	7
9	Jacopo Mosca (ITA)	Trek–Segafredo	7
10	Andrea Pasqualon (ITA)	Circus–Wanty Gobert	7

=== Mountains classification ===
Final mountains classification (1–10)
Rank	Rider	Team	Points
1	Julen Amezqueta (ESP)	Caja Rural–Seguros RGA	31
2	Ben O'Connor (AUS)	AG2R La Mondiale	26
3	Johan Jacobs (SUI)	Movistar Team	25
4	Jon Irisarri (ESP)	Caja Rural–Seguros RGA	13
5	Iván Sosa (COL)	Ineos Grenadiers	12
6	Jan Bakelants (BEL)	Circus–Wanty Gobert	9
7	Jesús Ezquerra (ESP)	Burgos BH	9
8	James Knox (GBR)	Deceuninck–Quick-Step	6
9	Simone Petilli (ITA)	Circus–Wanty Gobert	6
10	Umberto Marengo (ITA)	Vini Zabù–KTM	6

=== Young rider classification ===
Final young rider classification (1–10)
Rank	Rider	Team	Time
1	Jhonatan Narváez (ECU)	Ineos Grenadiers	15h 15' 54"
2	Andrea Bagioli (ITA)	Deceuninck–Quick-Step	+ 1"
3	João Almeida (POR)	Deceuninck–Quick-Step	+ 17"
4	Nicola Conci (ITA)	Trek–Segafredo	+ 30"
5	Pascal Eenkhoorn (NED)	Jumbo–Visma Development Team	+ 40"
6	Einer Rubio (COL)	Movistar Team	+ 1' 00"
7	Kevin Inkelaar (NED)	Bahrain–McLaren	+ 1' 07"
8	Ide Schelling (NED)	Bora–Hansgrohe	+ 1' 39"
9	Alessandro Covi (ITA)	UAE Team Emirates	+ 4' 33"
10	Gino Mäder (SUI)	NTT Pro Cycling	+ 5' 33"

=== Team classification ===
Final team classification (1–10)
Rank	Team	Time
1	Astana	45h 20' 45"
2	Deceuninck–Quick-Step	+ 5"
3	Androni Giocattoli–Sidermec	+ 19"
4	Nippo–Delko–One Provence	+ 5' 55"
5	UAE Team Emirates	+ 6' 27"
6	Ineos Grenadiers	+ 10' 59"
7	Caja Rural–Seguros RGA	+ 26' 53"
8	Vini Zabù–KTM	+ 27' 30"
9	Movistar Team	+ 28' 22"
10	Burgos BH	+ 30' 22"
