= Jacopo Mosca =

Italian cyclist

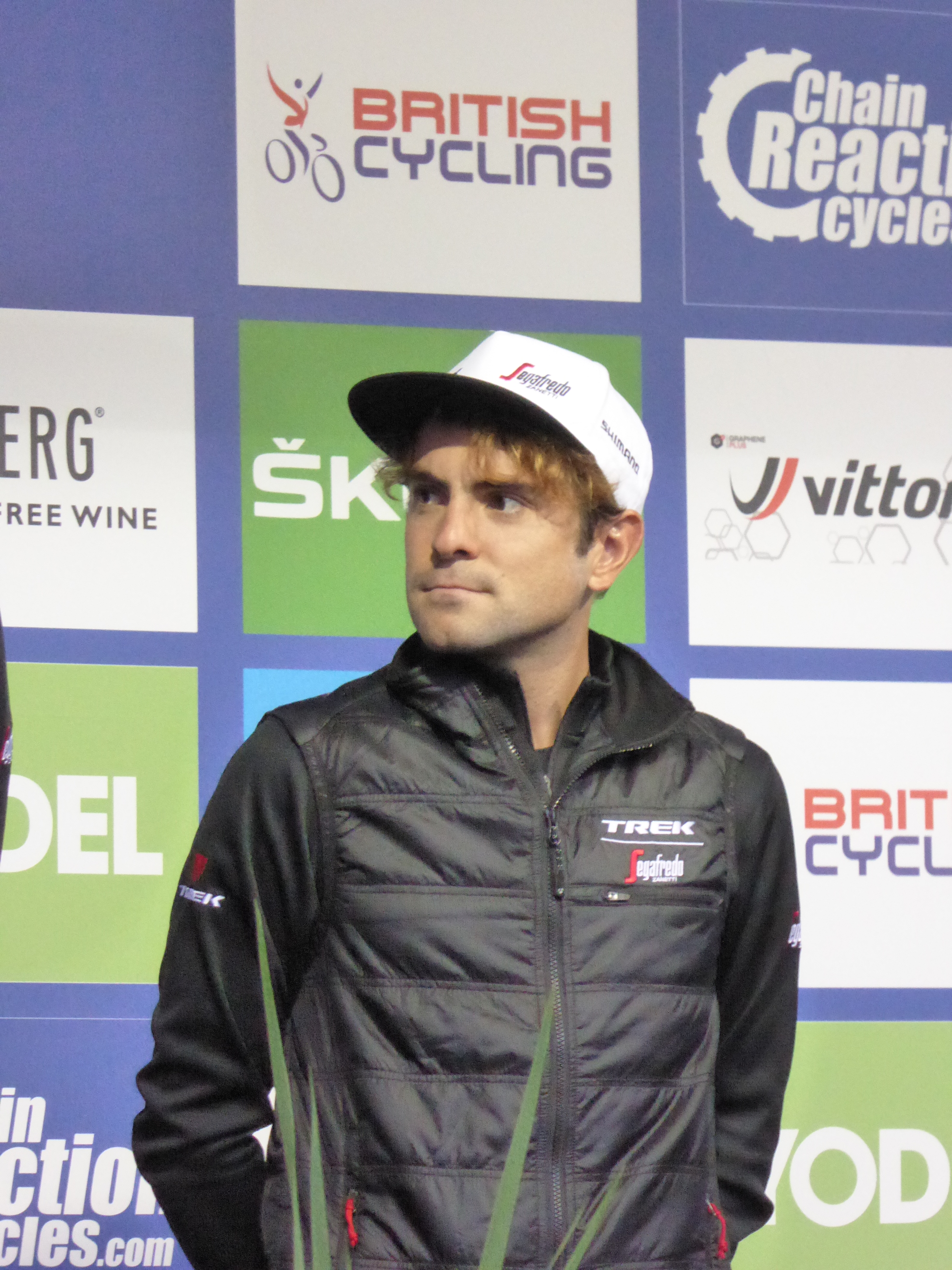
- Mosca at the 2016 Tour of Britain

Personal information
- Full name: Jacopo Mosca
- Born: 29 August 1993 (age 33) Savigliano, Italy

Cycling career
- Sport: Cycling
- Current team: Lidl–Trek
- Discipline: Road
- Role: Rider

Amateur teams
- 2013: GS Podenzano
- 2014–2016: Viris Maserati–Sisal Matchpoint
- 2016: Trek–Segafredo (stagiaire)

Professional teams
- 2017–2018: Wilier Triestina–Selle Italia
- 2019: D'Amico–UM Tools
- 2019–: Trek–Segafredo

Major wins
- Stage races Tour of Hainan (2017)

Jacopo Mosca (born 29 August 1993) is an Italian cyclist, who currently rides for UCI WorldTeam Lidl–Trek. In May 2018, he was named in the startlist for the Giro d'Italia. In August 2019, he was named in the startlist for the 2019 Vuelta a España. He married racing cyclist Elisa Longo Borghini in 2023.

== Major results ==
2011
1st Trofeo Comune di Vertova
7th Overall Giro della Lunigiana
2014
6th Trofeo Edil C
9th Gran Premio Industrie del Marmo
2015
6th Memorial Vincenzo Mantovani
7th Trofeo Edil C
8th Gran Premio Industrie del Marmo
9th Coppa della Pace
2016
10th Overall Tour of Britain
2017
1st Overall Tour of Hainan

1st Stage 7

1st Mountains classification, Tour de Korea
10th Overall Tour of Qinghai Lake
2018
1st Points classification, Tirreno–Adriatico
3rd Overall Tour of China I

1st Stage 4

2019
9th Overall Szlakiem Walk Majora Hubala
9th Overall Oberösterreich Rundfahrt
2020
4th Memorial Marco Pantani
4th Coppa Sabatini
4th Giro dell'Appennino
7th Overall Settimana Internazionale di Coppi e Bartali

=== Grand Tour general classification results timeline ===
| Grand Tour | 2018 | 2019 | 2020 | 2021 | 2022 | 2023 |
|---|---|---|---|---|---|---|
| Giro d'Italia | 98 | — | 31 | 52 | 103 | — |
| Tour de France | — | — | — | — | — | — |
| Vuelta a España | — | 85 | — | — | — | 92 |

Legend
| — | Did not compete |
| DNF | Did not finish |
