= Flanders Tomorrow Tour =

Belgian multi-day road cycling race

Race details
- Date: September
- Region: West Flanders
- Discipline: Road race
- Competition: UCI Europe Tour
- Type: Stage race
- Web site: bredenekoksijdeclassic.be/flanders-tomorrow-tour

History
- First edition: 2021
- Editions: 4 (as of 2026)
- First winner: Mick van Dijke (NED)
- Most wins: No repeat winners
- Most recent: Mads Landbo (DEN)

The Flanders Tomorrow Tour is a multi-day road bicycle race held annually in West Flanders, Belgium. In 2021, it was added to the UCI Europe Tour calendar as a category 2.2U event, so is reserved for under-23 riders.

The race consists of four stages over three days, including an individual time trial. The route crosses the province of West Flanders and is mostly flat with short climbs.

== Winners ==
Year	Country	Rider	Team
2021	Netherlands	Mick van Dijke	Jumbo–Visma Development Team
2022	Netherlands	Lars Boven	Jumbo–Visma Development Team
2023	Sweden	Jakob Söderqvist	Sweden (national team)
2024–2025	No race		
2026	Denmark	Mads Landbo	Team ColoQuick
