= Tomos Pattinson =

British cyclist (born 2005)

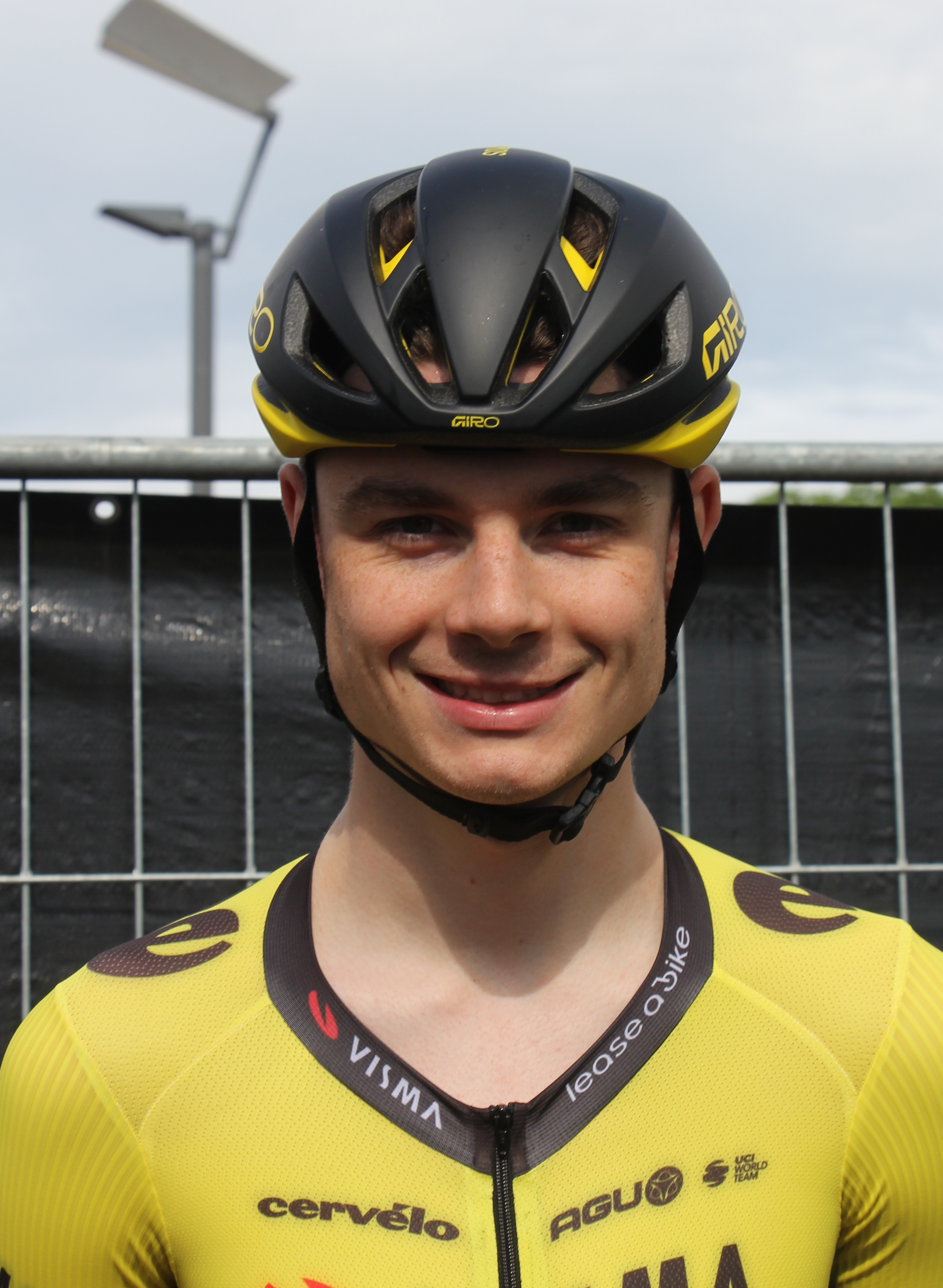
- Pattinson in 2024

Personal information
- Born: 17 October 2005 (age 21) Dudley
- Height: 1.85 m (6 ft 1 in)

Cycling career
- Sport: Cycling
- Current team: EF Education–Aevolo
- Disciplines: Track; Road
- Role: Rider

Amateur team
- 2022-2023: Tofauti Everyone Active

Professional teams
- 2024–2025: Visma–Lease a Bike Development
- 2026: EF Education–Aevolo
- 2027–: EF Education–EasyPost

Tomos Pattinson (born 17 October 2005) is a British professional cyclist who rides for UCI Continental team EF Education–Aevolo. In 2024, he became British U23 Time Trial Champion. He will join UCI WorldTeam EF Education–EasyPost in 2027.

== Early life ==
He is from Brierley Hill in the Metropolitan Borough of Dudley.

== Career ==
A member of Halesowen Cycling Club in Halesowen, Pattinson won the junior title in the RTTC National Hill Climb Championship in Derbyshire on 31 October 2021, at the age of 16 years-old. In 2022, he had a stage victory in the Junior Tour of Ireland and placed sixth overall at the Phillips Gilbert Juniors. He finished fourth overall at the Junior Tour of Wales. In 2023, he rode for the Tofauti Everyone Active team. In May 2023, he won the junior Liège-Bastogne-Liège in Belgium. He competed for Britain 2023 UCI Road World Championships – Men's junior road race in Glasgow.

He signed for Visma–Lease a Bike Development ahead of the 2024 season. He won the U23 time trial at the British National Time Trial Championships in Catterick, North Yorkshire on 19 June 2024.

Having ridden for EF Education–Aevolo in 2026, in November, it was announced Pattison would join UCI WorldTeam EF Education–EasyPost for the 2027 season.

== Major results ==
2022
4th Liège–Bastogne–Liège Juniors
6th Overall La Philippe Gilbert Juniors
9th Overall GP Général Patton
2023
1st Overall Junior Tour of Wales

1st Stage 1 (ITT)

1st Liège–Bastogne–Liège Juniors
3rd Overall Saarland Trofeo
3rd Overall Tour de Gironde
3rd Overall Gipuzkoa Klasikoa
3rd Road race, National Junior Road Championships
4th Overall Ronde des Vallées Juniors
6th Overall Guido Reybrouck Juniors
2024
1st Time trial, National Under-23 Road Championships
3rd Overall Istrian Spring Trophy
8th Giro del Belvedere
2025
3rd Eschborn–Frankfurt Under-23
4th Overall Istrian Spring Tour
5th Time trial, National Under-23 Road Championships
5th Coppa Città di San Daniele
8th Overall Orlen Nations Grand Prix
9th Giro del Belvedere
2026
6th Visit South Aegean GP
6th Coppa Città di San Daniele
8th Overall Circuit des Ardennes
