= Saarland Trofeo =

Junior cycling race in Germany

Trofeo Karlsberg
Race details
- Date: May/June
- Region: Saarland
- Discipline: Road race
- Competition: UCI Junior Nations' Cup
- Type: Stage race
- Web site: www.trofeo.online

History
- First edition: 1988
- Editions: 36 (as of 2024)
- First winner: Roman Judèz (YUG)
- Most wins: Mads Pedersen (DEN) (2 wins)
- Most recent: Jasper Schoofs (BEL)

The Saarland Trofeo, formerly the Trofeo Karlsberg, is a junior multi-day cycling race held annually in Germany. It is part of the UCI Junior Nations' Cup.

== Winners ==
Year	Winner	Second	Third
1988	(Socialist Federal Republic of Yugoslavia) Roman Judez		
1989	(United States) Bobby Julich		
1990	(East Germany) Volker Marquard		
1991–1992	No overall winner		
1993	(Germany) Jêrome Klein		
1994	(Germany) Andreas Klier		
1995	(Germany) Holger Loew		
1996	(Russia) Dimitri Dementiev		
1997	(Germany) Robert Kaiser	(United States) Bryan Hayes	
1998	(France) Anthony Geslin		
1999	(Sweden) Petter Renäng		
2000	(Germany) Marcel Sieberg		
2001	(Germany) Marcus Burghardt	(Germany) Thomas Fothen	(France) Mathieu Perget
2002	(Germany) Felix Odebrecht	(Germany) Sebastian Schwager	(Germany) Nico Graf
2003	(Russia) Anton Rechetnikov		
2004	(Denmark) Anders Berendt Hansen		
2005	(Latvia) Gatis Smukulis	(Austria) Stefan Denifl	(Germany) Florian Frohn
2006	(Germany) Oliver Giesecke	(Russia) Dmitriy Sokolov	(Austria) Matthias Krizek
2007	(Austria) Matthias Brändle	(Germany) Dominik Nerz	(Latvia) Indulis Bekmanis
2008	(Poland) Michał Kwiatkowski	(Norway) Vegard Breen	(Netherlands) Wilco Kelderman
2009	(Denmark) Emil Hovmand	(Netherlands) Dylan van Baarle	(Germany) Nikias Arndt
2010	(United States) Lawson Craddock	(Luxembourg) Bob Jungels	(Germany) Jasha Sütterlin
2011	(France) Pierre-Henri Lecuisinier	(Denmark) Rasmus Lund Hestbek	(Netherlands) Ivar Slik
2012	(Denmark) Mads Pedersen	(Sweden) Fredrik Ludvigsson	(United States) Taylor Eisenhart
2013	(Denmark) Mads Pedersen	(United States) Geoffrey Curran	(Denmark) Mathias Rask Jeppesen
2014	(Republic of Ireland) Eddie Dunbar	(Germany) Lennard Kämna	(Austria) Benjamin Brkic
2015	(Germany) Patrick Haller	(Belgium) Thomas Vereecken	(France) Clément Bétouigt-Suire
2016	(United States) Brandon McNulty	(United Kingdom) Ethan Hayter	(United States) Ian Garrison
2017	(Germany) Julius Johansen	(Germany) Niklas Märkl	(Netherlands) Daan Hoole
2018	(Norway) Søren Wærenskjold	(Czech Republic) Karel Vacek	(Norway) Ludvig Aasheim
2019	(Germany) Hannes Wilksch	(Germany) Marco Brenner	(Germany) Maurice Ballerstedt
2020	Cancelled		
2021	(Norway) Trym Brennsæter	(Germany) Moritz Kärsten	(Belgium) Maxence Place
2022	(Luxembourg) Mathieu Kockelmann	(France) Thibaud Gruel	(Norway) Jørgen Nordhagen
2023	(Germany) Louis Leidert	(Denmark) Patrick Frydkjær	(United Kingdom) Tomos Pattinson
2024	(Belgium) Jasper Schoofs	(United States) Ashlin Barry	(Norway) Felix Ørn-Kristoff
