= Tour du Pays de Montbéliard =

French multi-day road cycling race

Race details
- Date: June
- Region: Doubs, France
- Discipline: Road race
- Competition: UCI Europe Tour
- Type: Stage race
- Organiser: CC Étupes
- Web site: www.facebook.com/1er-Tour-du-Pays-de-Montb%C3%A9liard-117022319682298/

History
- First edition: 2020
- Editions: 4 (as of 2023)
- First winner: Stefan Bennett (FRA)
- Most wins: No repeat winners
- Most recent: Sten Van Gucht (BEL)

The Tour du Pays de Montbéliard is a multi-day road bicycle race held annually in the French Department of Doubs. The race was initially on the French national amateur calendar, having replaced the Grand Prix du Pays de Montbéliard. In 2021, it was added to the UCI Europe Tour calendar as a category 2.2U event, and in 2022 was changed to 2.2, removing the under-23 age limit.

The race consists of a short prologue on Friday and two circuit stages on Saturday and Sunday.

== Winners ==
Year	Country	Rider	Team
2020	France	Stefan Bennett	Pro Immo Nicolas Roux
2021	Germany	Maurice Ballerstedt	Jumbo–Visma Development Team
2022	Czech Republic	Michael Kukrle	Elkov–Kasper
2023	Belgium	Sten Van Gucht	Bourg-en-Bresse Ain Cyclisme
