= Mick van Dijke =

Dutch racing cyclist (born 2000)

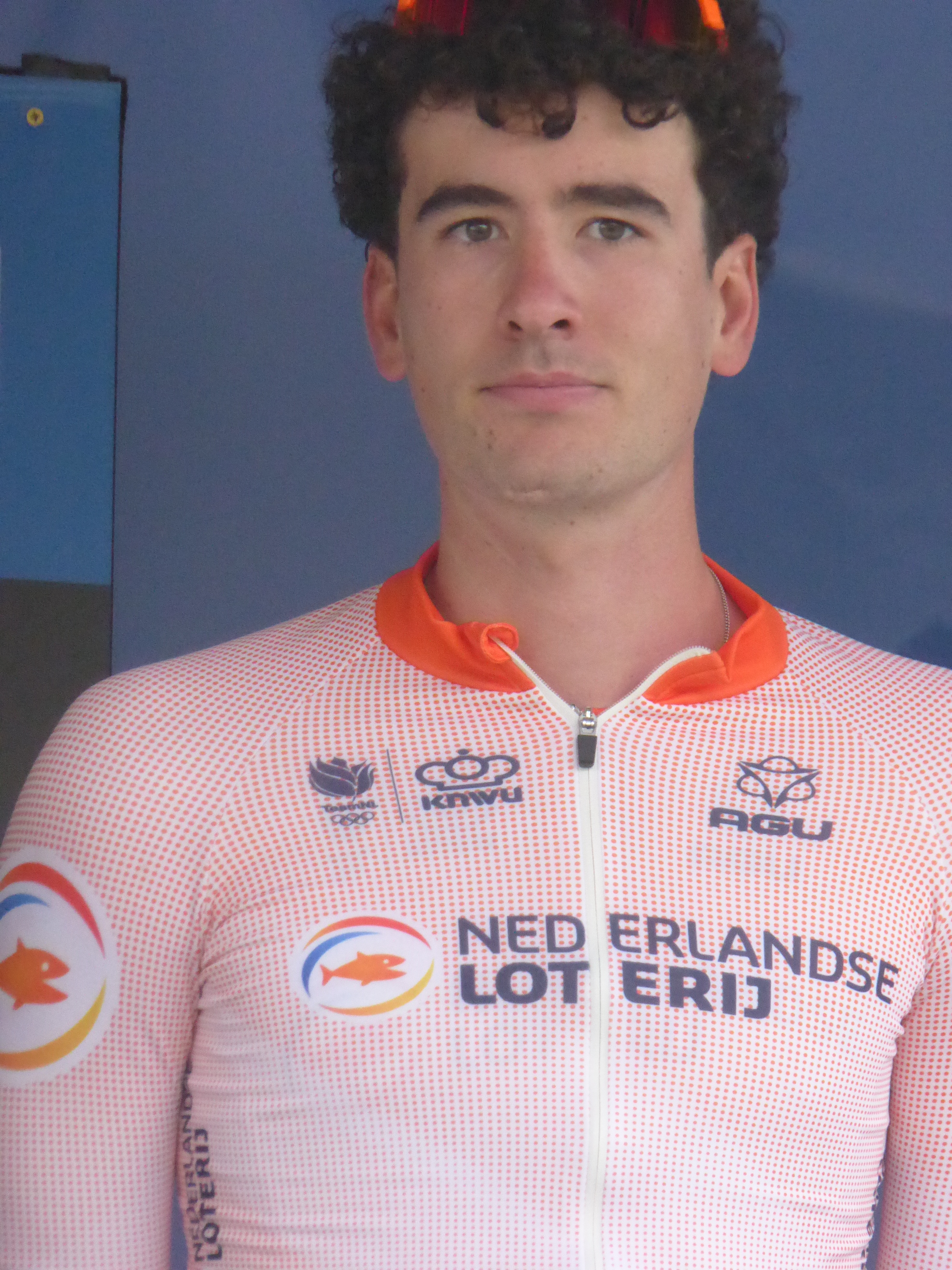
- Van Dijke in 2023

Personal information
- Full name: Mick van Dijke
- Born: 15 March 2000 (age 26) Goes, Netherlands
- Height: 1.9 m (6 ft 3 in)
- Weight: 74 kg (163 lb)

Cycling career
- Sport: Cycling
- Current team: Red Bull–Bora–Hansgrohe
- Discipline: Road
- Role: Rider

Amateur team
- 2019: ZRTC Theo Middelkamp

Professional teams
- 2020–2021: Jumbo–Visma Development Team
- 2021–2024: Team Jumbo–Visma
- 2025–: Red Bull–Bora–Hansgrohe

Mick van Dijke (born 15 March 2000) is a Dutch professional racing cyclist, who currently rides for UCI WorldTeam Red Bull–Bora–Hansgrohe. His twin brother Tim van Dijke also rides for the same team.

Van Dijke was contracted to join UCI WorldTeam Team Jumbo–Visma in the 2022 season, having signed a contract in July 2021. After showing promise with great results in 2021, it was announced that he would make an immediate transfer to the World Tour Team from early September for the remaining of the season and the following three years.

== Major results ==
2020
2nd Road race, National Under-23 Road Championships
2nd Overall Orlen Nations Grand Prix

1st Stage 1 (TTT)

9th GP Kranj
2021
National Under-23 Road Championships

1st Time trial
2nd Road race

1st Overall Flanders Tomorrow Tour

1st Points classification
1st Stages 3a (ITT) & 4

1st Stage 2 (TTT) Tour de l'Avenir
1st GP Vorarlberg
2nd Overall Kreiz Breizh Elites

1st Young rider classification
1st Stages 1 (TTT) & 3

3rd Overall CRO Race

1st Young rider classification

4th Overall Orlen Nations Grand Prix
5th Time trial, UCI Road World Under-23 Championships
7th Paris–Troyes
2022
2nd Visit Friesland Elfsteden Race
6th Overall ZLM Tour
6th Ronde van Drenthe
7th Overall Danmark Rundt
2024
2nd Time trial, National Road Championships
9th Vuelta a Murcia
2026 (1 pro win)
1st Stage 3 Eneco Tour
5th Overall ZLM Tour
6th Paris–Roubaix
