= Visma–Lease a Bike Development =

Dutch cycling team

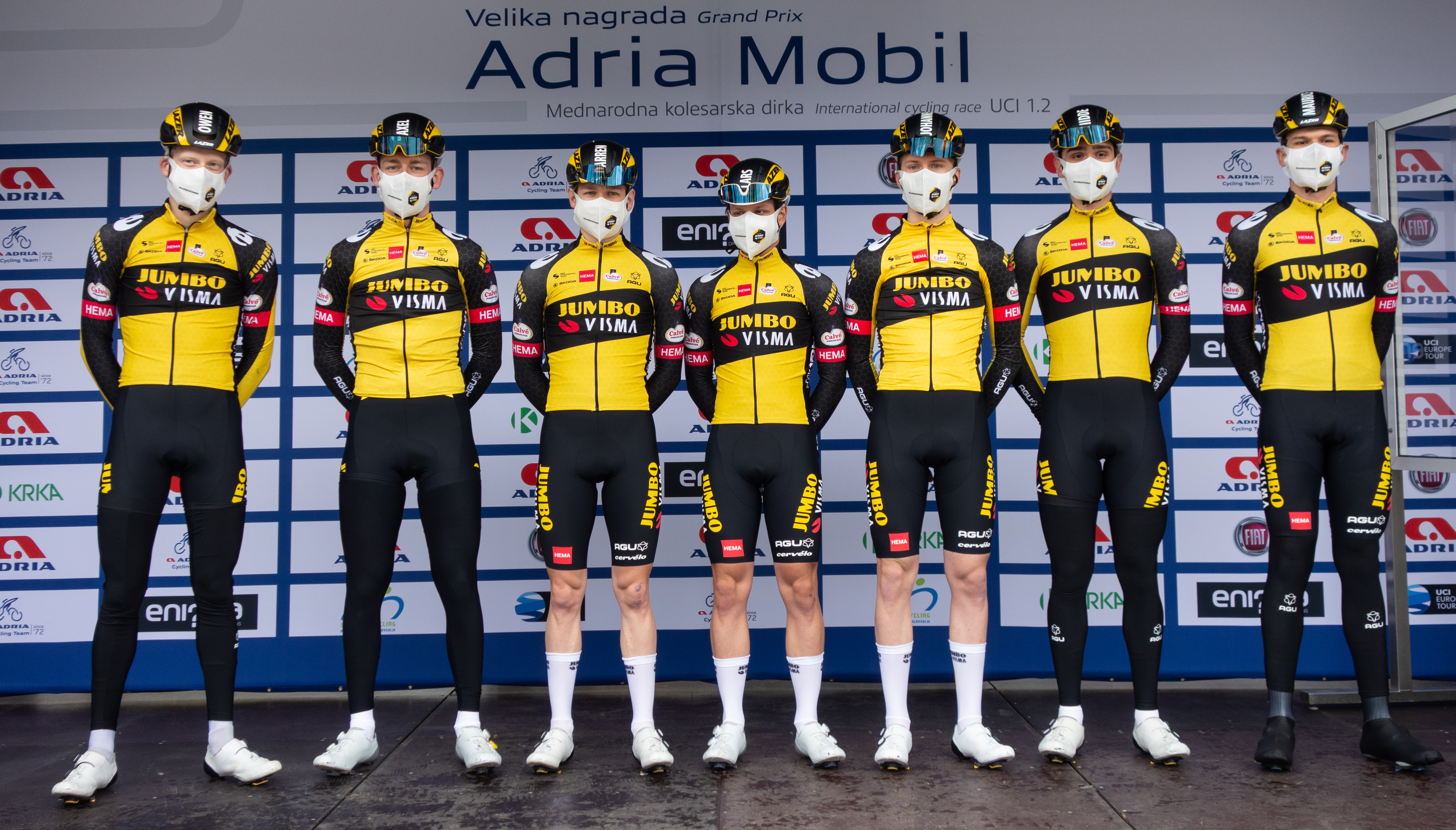

Team information
- UCI code: VLD
- Registered: Netherlands
- Founded: 2019
- Disciplines: Road; Cyclo-cross
- Status: UCI Continental
- Bicycles: Cervélo

Key personnel
- General manager: Robbert De Groot
- Team manager: Robert Wagner

Team name history
- 2020–2023 2024–: Jumbo–Visma Development Team; Visma–Lease a Bike Development

Visma–Lease a Bike Development is a Dutch UCI Continental team which was founded in mid-2019, and started competing in the 2020 season onwards. It is part of the wider Visma–Lease a Bike team, developing younger riders.

== Team roster ==
As of 30 June 2025.

Rider	Date of birth
Patryk Goszczurny (POL)	14 March 2006 (age 20)
Jonas Kind Høydahl (NOR)	19 December 2005 (age 20)
Cedric Keppens (BEL)	10 March 2006 (age 20)
Ian Kings (GER)	15 April 2006 (age 20)
Sjors Lugthart (NED)	22 June 2005 (age 21)
Pietro Mattio (ITA)	27 June 2004 (age 22)
Tomos Pattinson (GBR)	17 October 2005 (age 20)

Rider	Date of birth
Tim Rex (BEL)	11 April 2004 (age 22)
Elliot Rowe (GBR)	1 June 2006 (age 20)
William Smith (GBR)	21 March 2004 (age 22)
Jed Smithson (GBR)	19 August 2005 (age 21)
Mikal Grimstad Uglehus (NOR)	15 May 2005 (age 21)
Matisse Van Kerckhove (BEL)	11 September 2006 (age 19)

== Major wins ==
2020
New Zealand National Under-23 Time Trial Championships, Finn Fisher-Black
New Zealand National Under-23 Road Race Championships, Finn Fisher-Black
Trofej Umag, Olav Kooij
Poreč Trophy, Olav Kooij
GP Kranj, Olav Kooij
Stage 1a Settimana Internazionale di Coppi e Bartali, Olav Kooij
Stage 4 Settimana Internazionale di Coppi e Bartali, Pascal Eenkhoorn
Stage 3 Bałtyk–Karkonosze Tour, Lars Boven
2021
New Zealand National Under-23 Time Trial Championships, Finn Fisher-Black
Overall Istrian Spring Trophy, Finn Fisher-Black

Prologue, Lars Boven

Netherlands National Under-23 Time Trial Championships, Mick van Dijke
Netherlands National Under-23 Road Race Championships, Tim van Dijke
Germany National Under-23 Time Trial Championships, Michel Hessmann
Prologue (TTT) Tour Alsace (Note: The winning riders were Lars Boven, Johannes Staune-Mittet, and Loe van Belle)
Stage 1 (TTT) Kreiz Breizh Elites (Note: The winning riders were Maurice Ballerstedt, Owen Geleijn, Michel Hessmann, Mick van Dijke, Tim van Dijke, and Hidde van Veenendaal)
Stage 4 Kreiz Breizh Elites, Mick van Dijke
Overall Tour du Pays de Montbéliard, Maurice Ballerstedt

Stage 2, Loe van Belle
Stage 3, Maurice Ballerstedt

Overall Flanders Tomorrow Tour, Mick van Dijke

Stage 1, Loe van Belle
Stages 3a (ITT) & 3b, Mick van Dijke

Overall Ronde de l'Isard, Gijs Leemreize

Stage 3, Johannes Staune-Mittet
Stage 5, Gijs Leemreize

2022
Stage 3b Le Triptyque des Monts et Chateaux, Per Strand Hagenes
Stage 2 Oberösterreich Rundfahrt, Per Strand Hagenes
Overall Flanders Tomorrow Tour, Lars Boven

Stage 2, Lars Boven

Overall Ronde de l'Isard, Johannes Staune-Mittet

Stage 1, Johannes Staune-Mittet
Stage 2 (TTT) (Note: The winning riders were Lars Boven, Tijmen Graat, Johannes Staune-Mittet, Archie Ryan, and Darren van Bekkum)
Stage 5, Archie Ryan

Paris–Tours Espoirs, Per Strand Hagenes
2023
Overall Istrian Spring Trophy, Tijmen Graat

Stage 2, Tijmen Graat

Stage 1 (ITT) Olympia's Tour, Per Strand Hagenes
Stage 5 Olympia's Tour, Jesse Kramer
Giro del Belvedere, Johannes Staune-Mittet
G.P. Palio del Recioto, Tijmen Graat
Flèche Ardennaise, Menno Huising
Overall Giro Next Gen, Johannes Staune-Mittet

Stage 4, Johannes Staune-Mittet

Coppa Città di San Daniele, Archie Ryan
2024
Umag Trophy, Matthew Brennan
Poreč Trophy, Matthew Brennan
Stage 7 Tour de Bretagne, Jesse Kramer
Overall Ronde de l'Isard, Darren van Bekkum

Stage 4, Darren van Bekkum

Stage 8 Giro Next Gen, Matthew Brennan
United Kingdom National Under-23 Time Trial Championships, Tomos Pattinson
Stage 3 Tour Alsace, Jørgen Nordhagen
Gran Premio di Poggiana, Jørgen Nordhagen
Overall Giro della Regione Friuli Venezia Giulia, Jørgen Nordhagen

Stage 3, Jørgen Nordhagen

Coppa Città di San Daniele, Jørgen Nordhagen
2025
Le Tour des 100 Communes, Matthew Brennan
Grand Prix de la Ville de Lillers, Matthew Brennan
Rund um Köln, Matthew Brennan
Stage 8 Giro Next Gen, Jørgen Nordhagen
2026
1st Overall Istrian Spring Tour, Matisse Van Kerckhove

== National champions ==
2020
New Zealand Under–23 Time Trial, Finn Fisher-Black
New Zealand Under–23 Road Race, Finn Fisher-Black
Germany Under–23 Cross Country, Michel Hessmann
2021
New Zealand Under–23 Time Trial, Finn Fisher-Black
Netherlands Under–23 Time Trial, Mick van Dijke
Netherlands Under–23 Road Race, Tim van Dijke
Germany Under–23 Time Trial, Michel Hessmann
2024
Great Britain Under-23 Time Trial, Tomos Pattinson

== See also ==
- Visma–Lease a Bike (men's team)
- Visma–Lease a Bike (women's team)
