= Lennard Hofstede =

Dutch cyclist (born 1994)

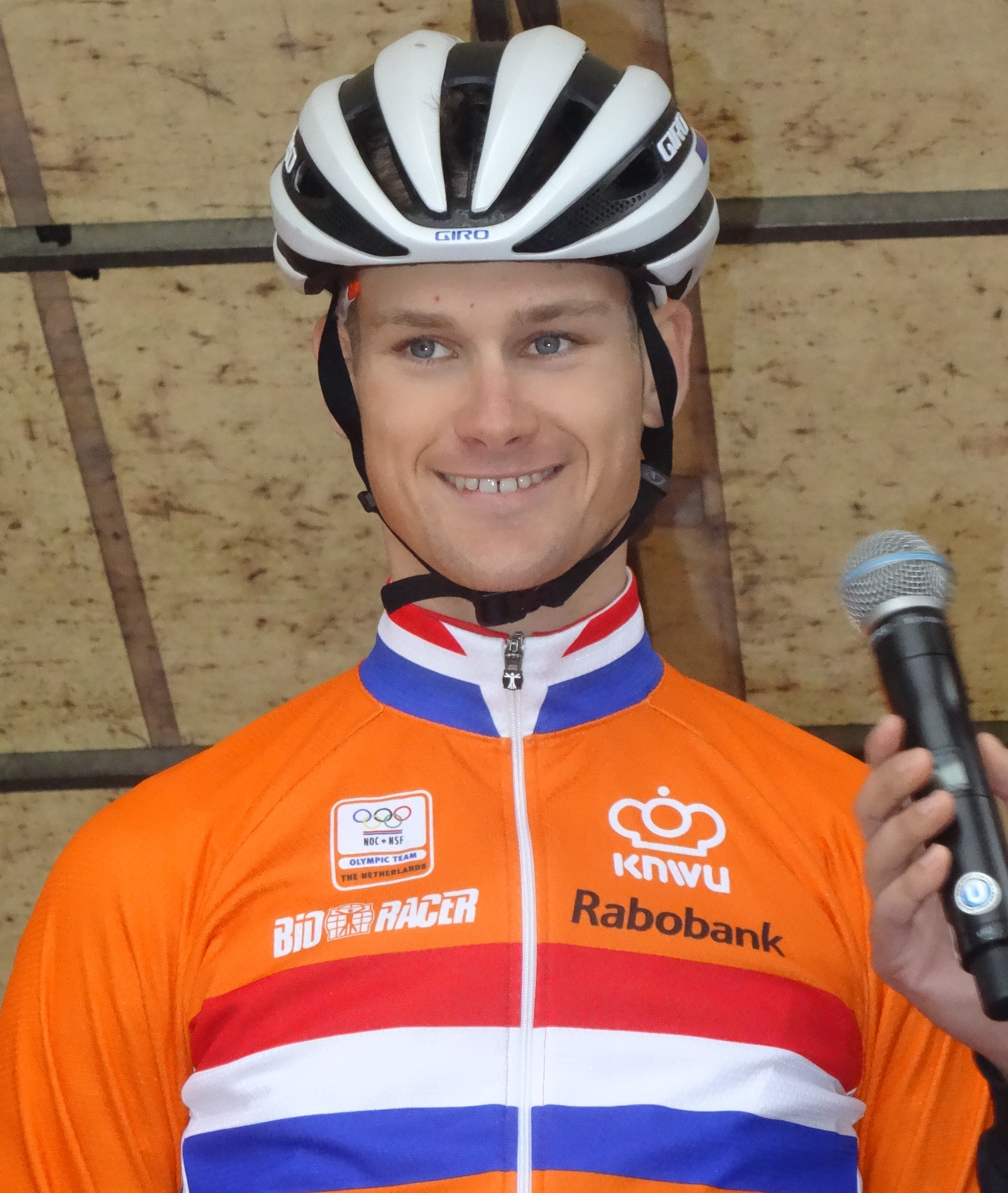
- Hofstede in 2014

Personal information
- Born: 29 December 1994 (age 31) Poeldijk, Netherlands
- Height: 1.88 m (6 ft 2 in)
- Weight: 73 kg (161 lb)

Cycling career
- Sport: Cycling
- Current team: Retired
- Discipline: Road
- Role: Rider

Amateur team
- 2013–2016: Rabobank Development Team

Professional teams
- 2017–2018: Team Sunweb
- 2019–2023: Team Jumbo–Visma

Lennard Hofstede (born 29 December 1994) is a Dutch former racing cyclist, who competed as a professional from 2013 to 2023. He rode at the 2014 UCI Road World Championships. He was named in the startlist for the 2017 Vuelta a España, which was his first Grand Tour. In May 2018, he was named in the startlist for the 2018 Giro d'Italia, the time he comepeted in the race.

== Major results ==
2012
1st Stage 1 Driedaagse van Axel
3rd Overall GP Général Patton
10th Kuurne–Brussels–Kuurne Juniores
2015
3rd Coppa dei Laghi-Trofeo Almar
4th Piccolo Giro di Lombardia
10th Overall Tour des Pays de Savoie
2016
1st Overall Rhône-Alpes Isère Tour

1st Young rider classification
1st Stage 2

3rd Overall Tour de Bretagne
4th Liège–Bastogne–Liège Espoirs
10th Flèche Ardennaise
2017
5th Overall Danmark Rundt
9th Overall Tour de Yorkshire

=== Grand Tour general classification results timeline ===
Grand Tour	2017	2018	2019	2020	2021
Giro d'Italia	—	144	—	—	—
Tour de France	—	—	—	—	—
Vuelta a España	DNF	—	152	51	128

Legend
—	Did not compete
DNF	Did not finish
