= UCI Road World Championships – Junior men's time trial =

World championship individual time trial race for junior men

UCI Juniors Road World Championships – Men's time trial is the annual world championship for road bicycle racing in the discipline of time trial, organised by the world governing body, the Union Cycliste Internationale. The event was first run in 1994. In 2020 no junior race was held due to the COVID-19 pandemic.

== Medal winners ==
Championships	Gold	Silver	Bronze
1994 Quito	Dean Rogers (AUS)	Heath Sandall (USA)	Laurent Lefèvre (FRA)
1995 Forlì	Joshua Kane Collingwood (AUS)	Mirko Lauria (ITA)	Cadel Evans (AUS)
1996 Novo Mesto	Simone Lo Vano (ITA)	Mathew Hayman (AUS)	Yuriy Krivtsov (UKR)
1997 San Sebastián	Torsten Hiekmann (GER)	Michael Rogers (AUS)	Alexei Markov (RUS)
1998 Valkenburg	Fabian Cancellara (SUI)	Torsten Hiekmann (GER)	Filippo Pozzato (ITA)
1999 Verona	Fabian Cancellara (SUI)	Ruslan Kayumov (RUS)	Christian Knees (GER)
2000 Plouay	Piotr Mazur (POL)	Vladimir Gusev (RUS)	Christian Müller (GER)
2001 Lisbon	Jurgen Van den Broeck (BEL)	Oleksandr Kvachuk (UKR)	Niels Scheuneman (NED)
2002 Zolder and Hasselt	Mikhail Ignatiev (RUS)	Mark Jamieson (AUS)	Vincenzo Nibali (ITA)
2003 Hamilton	Mikhail Ignatiev (RUS)	Dmytro Grabovskyy (UKR)	Viktor Renang (SWE)
2004 Verona	Patrick Gretsch (GER)	Roman Kreuziger (CZE)	Stefan Schäfer (GER)
2005 Vienna	Marcel Kittel (GER)	Alexandre Pliușchin (MDA)	Siarhei Papok (BLR)
2006 Spa & Gent	Marcel Kittel (GER)	Etienne Pierret (FRA)	Tony Gallopin (FRA)
2007 Aguascalientes	Taylor Phinney (USA)	John Degenkolb (GER)	Nikita Novikov (RUS)
2008 Cape Town	Michał Kwiatkowski (POL)	Jakob Steigmiller (GER)	Taylor Phinney (USA)
2009 Moscow	Luke Durbridge (AUS)	Lawson Craddock (USA)	Lasse Norman Hansen (DEN)
2010 Offida	Bob Jungels (LUX)	Jasha Sütterlin (GER)	Lawson Craddock (USA)
2011 Copenhagen	Mads Würtz Schmidt (DEN)	James Oram (NZL)	David Edwards (AUS)
2012 Valkenburg	Oskar Svendsen (NOR)	Matej Mohorič (SLO)	Maximilian Schachmann (GER)
2013 Florence	Igor Decraene (BEL)	Mathias Krigbaum (DEN)	Zeke Mostov (USA)
2014 Ponferrada	Lennard Kämna (GER)	Adrien Costa (USA)	Michael Storer (AUS)
2015 Richmond	Leo Appelt (GER)	Adrien Costa (USA)	Brandon McNulty (USA)
2016 Doha	Brandon McNulty (USA)	Mikkel Bjerg (DEN)	Ian Garrison (USA)
2017 Bergen	Tom Pidcock (GBR)	Antonio Puppio (ITA)	Filip Maciejuk (POL)
2018 Innsbruck	Remco Evenepoel (BEL)	Lucas Plapp (AUS)	Andrea Piccolo (ITA)
2019 Yorkshire	Antonio Tiberi (ITA)	Enzo Leijnse (NED)	Marco Brenner (GER)
2021 Flanders	Gustav Wang (DEN)	Josh Tarling (GBR)	Alec Segaert (BEL)
2022 Wollongong	Josh Tarling (GBR)	Hamish McKenzie (AUS)	Emil Herzog (GER)
2023 Glasgow	Oscar Chamberlain (AUS)	Ben Wiggins (GBR)	Louis Leidert (GER)
2024 Zurich	Paul Seixas (FRA)	Jasper Schoofs (BEL)	Matisse van Kerckhove (BEL)
2025 Kigali	Michiel Mouris (NED)	Ashlin Barry (USA)	Seff Van Kerckhove (BEL)

=== Medallists by nation ===
Rank	Nation	Gold	Silver	Bronze	Total
1	Germany	6	4	7	17
2	Australia	4	5	3	12
3	Belgium	3	1	3	7
4	United States	2	5	5	12
5	Italy	2	2	3	7
6	Russia	2	2	2	6
7	Denmark	2	2	1	5
8	Great Britain	2	2	0	4
9	Poland	2	0	1	3
10	Switzerland	2	0	0	2
11	France	1	1	2	4
12	Netherlands	1	1	1	3
13	Luxembourg	1	0	0	1
13	Norway	1	0	0	1
15	Ukraine	0	2	1	3
16	Czech Republic	0	1	0	1
16	Moldova	0	1	0	1
16	New Zealand	0	1	0	1
16	Slovenia	0	1	0	1
20	Belarus	0	0	1	1
20	Sweden	0	0	1	1
Totals (21 entries)		31	31	31	93
