= Johannes Staune-Mittet =

Norwegian cyclist (born 2002)

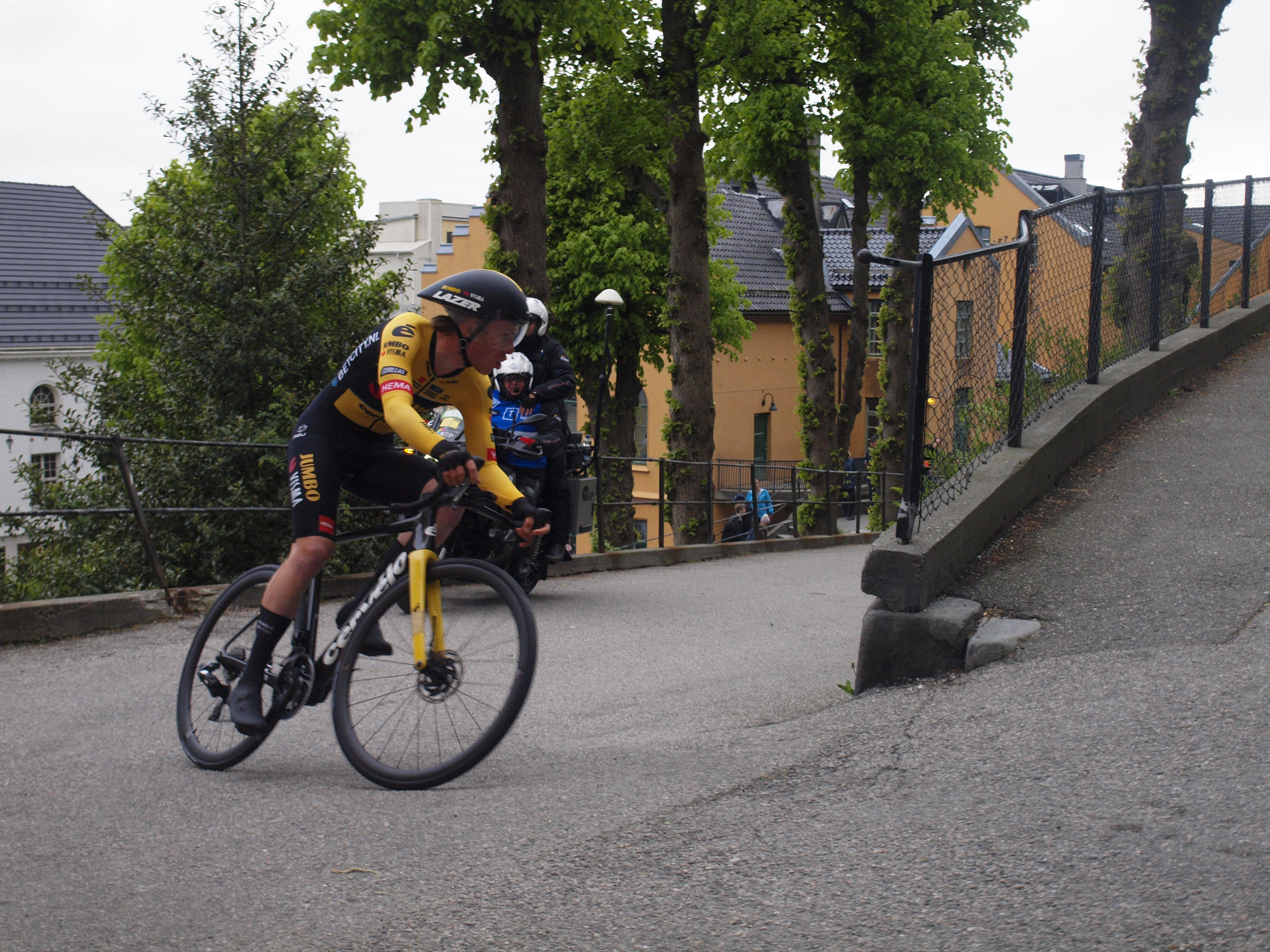
- Staune-Mittet at the 2023 Tour of Norway

Personal information
- Full name: Johannes Staune-Mittet
- Born: 18 January 2002 (age 24) Lillehammer, Norway
- Height: 1.82 m (6 ft 0 in)

Cycling career
- Sport: Cycling
- Current team: Decathlon CMA CGM Team
- Discipline: Road
- Role: Rider

Professional teams
- 2021–2023: Jumbo–Visma Development Team
- 2024: Visma–Lease a Bike
- 2025–: Decathlon–AG2R La Mondiale

Johannes Staune-Mittet (born 18 January 2002) is a Norwegian professional racing cyclist, who currently rides for UCI WorldTeam Decathlon CMA CGM Team.

== Major results ==
2019
1st Time trial, National Junior Road Championships
8th Overall Grand Prix Rüebliland
9th Overall Tour du Pays de Vaud
2020
2nd Time trial, National Junior Road Championships
2021
1st Prologue (TTT) Tour Alsace
4th Overall Ronde de l'Isard

1st Stage 3

4th Overall Tour of Małopolska

1st Young rider classification

10th Trofeo Piva
10th Liège–Bastogne–Liège Espoirs
2022
1st Overall Ronde de l'Isard

1st Young rider classification
1st Stages 1 & 2a (TTT)

2nd Road race, National Under-23 Road Championships
2nd Overall Tour de l'Avenir
3rd Overall Oberösterreich Rundfahrt

1st Young rider classification

3rd G.P. Palio del Recioto
5th Overall Alpes Isère Tour
5th Overall Sazka Tour

1st Young rider classification

6th Liège–Bastogne–Liège Espoirs
10th Overall Istrian Spring Trophy
2023 (1 pro win)
1st Overall Giro Next Gen

1st Mountains classification
1st Stage 4

1st Giro del Belvedere
1st Stage 3 Czech Tour
5th G.P. Palio del Recioto
2025
8th Overall Vuelta a Andalucía
