= Pascal Eenkhoorn =

Dutch cyclist

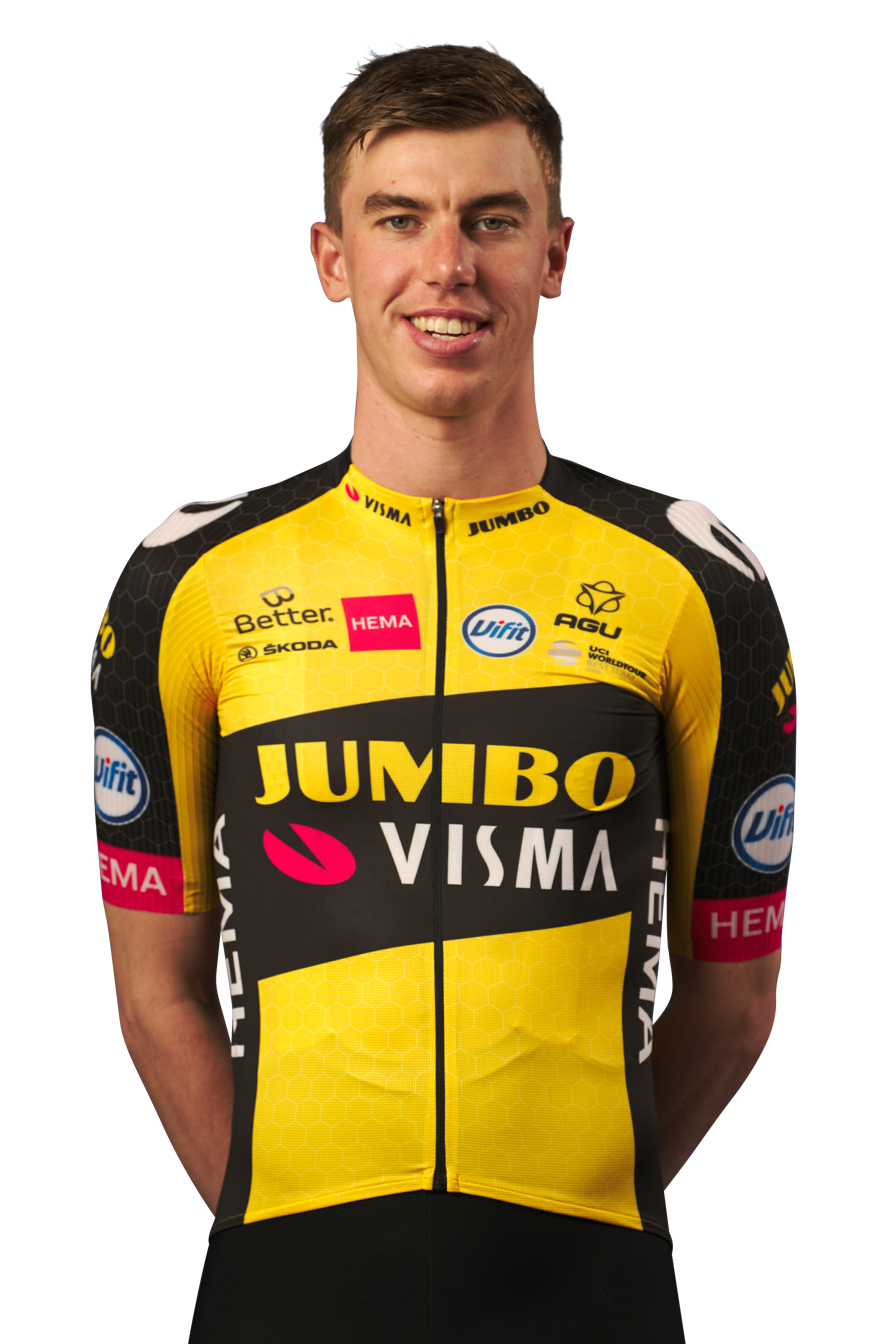
- Eenkhoorn in 2021

Personal information
- Nickname: The Master
- Born: 8 February 1997 (age 29) Zwolle, Netherlands
- Height: 1.85 m (6 ft 1 in)
- Weight: 70 kg (154 lb)

Cycling career
- Sport: Cycling
- Current team: Soudal–Quick-Step
- Discipline: Road
- Role: Rider

Amateur team
- 2016–2017: BMC Development Team

Professional teams
- 2018–2022: LottoNL–Jumbo
- 2023–2024: Lotto–Dstny
- 2025–: Soudal–Quick-Step

Major wins
- One-day races and Classics National Road Race Championships (2022)

Pascal Eenkhoorn (born 8 February 1997) is a Dutch cyclist, who currently rides for UCI WorldTeam Soudal–Quick-Step.

== Career ==
Eenkhoorn was born in Zwolle. After being part of the BMC Development Team in 2016 and 2017, Eenkhoorn signed a three-year contract with LottoNL–Jumbo starting in 2018. In December 2017, he was suspended for 2 months by his team, for possession of sleeping pills during a pre-season training camp – violating the team's internal rules.

In 2022, Eenkhoorn won the Dutch National Road Race Championships.

== Major results ==
2014
1st Mountains classification, Course de la Paix Juniors
2nd Time trial, National Junior Road Championships
2nd Overall Aubel–Thimister–La Gleize

1st Young rider classification

3rd Grand Prix Bati-Metallo
5th Overall Trophée Centre Morbihan
2015
1st La Bernaudeau Junior
1st Grand Prix André Noyelle
National Junior Road Championships

2nd Road race
2nd Time trial

2nd Paris–Roubaix Juniors
5th Overall Niedersachsen Rundfahrt der Junioren
8th Overall Grand Prix Rüebliland
9th Trofeo comune di Vertova Memorial Pietro Merelli
2016
2nd Time trial, National Under-23 Road Championships
5th Overall Tour de Berlin

1st Young rider classification
1st Prologue

2017
1st Overall Olympia's Tour

1st Young rider classification
1st Prologue

National Under-23 Road Championships

2nd Time trial
5th Road race

2nd Overall Rhône-Alpes Isère Tour

1st Young rider classification

8th Overall Tour de Normandie

1st Young rider classification

2018 (2 pro wins)
1st Stage 1a Settimana Internazionale di Coppi e Bartali
1st Stage 3 Colorado Classic
10th Overall Tour of Britain

1st Stage 5 (TTT)

2019
7th Road race, UCI Road World Under-23 Championships
2020 (1)
4th Road race, National Road Championships
6th Overall Settimana Internazionale di Coppi e Bartali

1st Stage 4

8th Overall Czech Cycling Tour
2021 (1)
1st Heistse Pijl
5th Overall Tour de Wallonie
10th Overall Tour de Pologne
2022 (1)
1st Road race, National Road Championships
Combativity award Stage 13 Giro d'Italia
2023
1st Mountains classification, Tour de Suisse
3rd Volta Limburg Classic
7th Vuelta a Murcia
2024
2nd Volta NXT Classic
2nd Polynormande
2025
10th Overall Deutschland Tour
2026
7th NXT Classic

=== Grand Tour general classification results timeline ===
Grand Tour	2022	2023	2024	2025
Giro d'Italia	62	—	—	—
Tour de France	—	91	—	49
Vuelta a España	—	—	—	

=== Major championships timeline ===
Event		2018	2019	2020	2021	2022
Olympic Games	Road race	Not held			—	NH
World Championships	Road race	—	—	DNF	66	
National Championships	Road race	47	60	4	30	1

Legend
—	Did not compete
DNF	Did not finish
DSQ	Disqualified
NH	Not held

Sporting positions
Preceded by Timo Roosen	Dutch National Road Race; Champion; 2022	Succeeded by Incumbent
