= 2015 Eneco Tour =

2015 UCI World Tour, race 21 of 28

Race details
- Dates: 10–16 August 2015
- Stages: 7
- Distance: 1,120.7 km (696.4 mi)

Results
Jersey awarded to the overall winner	Winner	Tim Wellens (BEL)	(Lotto–Soudal)
	Second	Greg Van Avermaet (BEL)	(BMC Racing Team)
	Third	Wilco Kelderman (NED)	(LottoNL–Jumbo)
Jersey awarded to the points classification winner	Points	André Greipel (GER)	(Lotto–Soudal)
Jersey awarded to the combativity classification winner	Combativity	Gijs Van Hoecke (BEL)	(Topsport Vlaanderen–Baloise)
	Team	Lotto–Soudal	

The 2015 Eneco Tour was a road cycling stage race that took place in the Netherlands and Belgium between 10 and 16 August 2015. It was the 11th edition of the Eneco Tour stage race and was the twenty-first race of the 2015 UCI World Tour.

The Eneco Tour is an unusual race in the cycling season: it primarily favours classics riders rather than climbers. The first three stages of the race were suitable for sprinters; the fourth stage was an individual time trial; and the final three stages were suitable for the classics riders. Elia Viviani (Team Sky) won the first stage and was the first rider to wear the leader's jersey. Jesper Asselman (Team Roompot) took over the lead after the second stage due to time bonuses, before losing it in the time trial to Jos van Emden (LottoNL–Jumbo). Wilco Kelderman (also LottoNL–Jumbo) took the lead after the fifth stage, but lost it to Tim Wellens (Lotto–Soudal) the following day. Wellens defended his lead on the final stage to win his second successive Eneco Tour; he had been the defending champion after victory in 2014. Greg Van Avermaet (BMC Racing Team) was second, with Kelderman third.

The points classification was won by André Greipel (Lotto–Soudal) and the combativity award by Gijs Van Hoecke (Topsport Vlaanderen–Baloise). Lotto–Soudal also won the team classification.

== Teams ==
The 17 UCI World Tour teams were automatically entitled and obliged to start the race; three UCI Professional Continental teams were invited as wildcards to form a twenty-team peloton. Each team entered eight riders to form a 160-rider peloton; one rider, BMC Racing Team's Daniel Oss, withdrew before the race due to a fall in training, so 159 riders started the race.

World Tour teams

- AG2R La Mondiale
- Astana
- BMC Racing Team
- Cannondale–Garmin
- Etixx–Quick-Step
- FDJ
- Team Giant–Alpecin
- IAM Cycling
- Team Katusha
- Lampre–Merida
- LottoNL–Jumbo
- Lotto–Soudal
- Movistar Team
- Orica–GreenEDGE
- Team Sky
- Tinkoff–Saxo
- Trek Factory Racing

Professional Continental teams

- Team Roompot
- Wanty–Groupe Gobert
- Topsport Vlaanderen–Baloise

== Schedule ==
The first three stages of the race were flat road stages, with no classified climbs. All of these stages were expected to suit the sprinters, though crosswinds had the potential to make the stages more difficult. The decisive section of the race was expect to start with the individual time trial on stage 4. The final three stages of the race were expected to suit classics riders: the fifth and sixth stages were hilly stages in the style of the Ardennes classics, while the final stage used roads that feature in the cobbled classics. One change to the regulations in 2015 was the introduction of a "golden kilometre", a series of three intermediate sprints on each road stage approximately 20 kilometres (12 mi) before the finish. The first three riders across each of these sprint points won bonus seconds in the general classification. This replicated the system from the 2015 Tour of Belgium, where the golden kilometre system had played a part in the victory of Greg Van Avermaet (BMC Racing Team).

Stage	Date	Route	Distance	Type	Winner
1	10 August	Bolsward (Netherlands) to Bolsward (Netherlands)	183.5 km (114 mi)	Flat stage	Elia Viviani (ITA)
2	11 August	Breda (Netherlands) to Breda (Netherlands)	180 km (112 mi)	Flat stage	André Greipel (GER)
3	12 August	Beveren (Belgium) to Ardooie (Belgium)	171.9 km (107 mi)	Flat stage	Tom Boonen (BEL)
4	13 August	Hoogerheide (Netherlands) to Hoogerheide (Netherlands)	13.9 km (9 mi)	Individual time trial	Jos van Emden (NED)
5	14 August	Riemst (Belgium) to Sittard-Geleen (Netherlands)	179.6 km (112 mi)	Hilly stage	Johan Le Bon (FRA)
6	15 August	Heerlen (Netherlands) to Houffalize (Belgium)	198 km (123 mi)	Hilly stage	Tim Wellens (BEL)
7	16 August	Sint-Pieters-Leeuw (Belgium) to Geraardsbergen (Belgium)	193.8 km (120 mi)	Hilly stage with cobblestones	Manuel Quinziato (ITA)

== Pre-race favourites ==
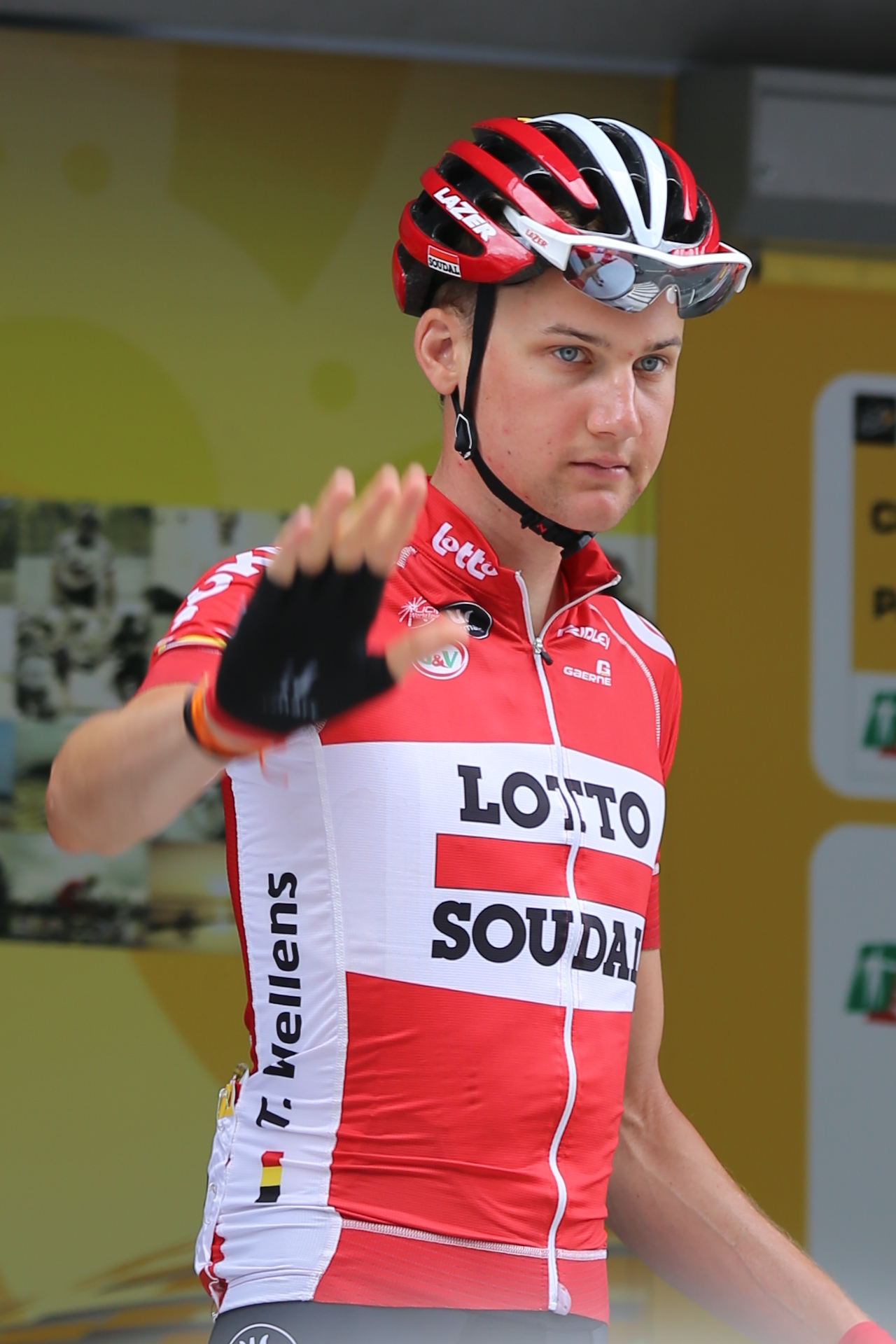
Tim Wellens (Lotto–Soudal), winner of the 2014 Eneco Tour (photographed at the 2015 Tour de France)

Most World Tour stage races are won by strong climbers. The Eneco Tour is unusual because the favourites for overall victory were classics riders—those who perform strongly in the Ardennes classics and the cobbled classics that feature in the early part of the cycling season.

The defending champion was Tim Wellens (Lotto–Soudal), who won the 2014 Eneco Tour in the penultimate stage. He was one of the favourites again, although Cycling Weekly predicted that he would be given less freedom to attack as the defending champion. One other former winner of the race took part in 2015: Lars Boom (Astana) had won in 2012. He was another strong favourite in 2015, especially as the race included a longer time trial than other recent editions of the race. Other favourites included Niki Terpstra (Etixx–Quick-Step), who was third in 2012, Greg Van Avermaet (BMC Racing Team), who was in strong form after coming close to victory in the Clásica de San Sebastián, Philippe Gilbert (also BMC) and Wilco Kelderman (LottoNL–Jumbo).

The first three stages of the race were flat and therefore particularly suitable for sprinters. Prominent sprinters taking part in the race included André Greipel (Lotto–Soudal), Giacomo Nizzolo (Trek Factory Racing), Elia Viviani (Team Sky), Andrea Guardini (Astana) and Edward Theuns (Topsport Vlaanderen–Baloise).

== Stages ==
=== Stage 1 ===
10 August 2015 – Bolsward to Bolsward, 183.5 km (114.0 mi)

The first stage was a 183.5-kilometre (114.0 mi) flat stage in the Netherlands, starting and finishing in Bolsward. The race began with a large loop south of the town, through Sneek and then north along the coast from Oudemirdum, then returning to Bolsward. After the first time across the finish line, the race turned north for a shorter loop, through Franeker and then south along the coast from Harlingen, before returning to Bolsward for the second time across the finish line. There were then two laps of a 20.4-kilometre (12.7 mi) finishing circuit. The stage contained no climbs.

The day's early breakaway was formed by Nathan Haas (Cannondale–Garmin), Frederik Veuchelen (Wanty–Groupe Gobert), Laurens De Vreese (Astana), Jesper Asselman (Team Roompot), Nico Denz (AG2R La Mondiale), and David Boucher (FDJ). The racing conditions were fairly easy, as there were no crosswinds. The breakaway's lead was over seven minutes at one point, but this was quickly closed down by the peloton and reduced to three minutes with 40 kilometres (25 mi) remaining. There were three intermediate sprints in the space of 1 kilometre (0.62 mi), described as a "golden kilometre", which were won by Denz, Asselman and de Vreese respectively. The breakaway was then caught and Team Sky and Lotto–Soudal drove the peloton towards the finish line. Sky's Andy Fenn was leading out his teammate Elia Viviani and, with 500 metres (1,600 ft) remaining, Viviani was able to follow the wheel of André Greipel (Lotto–Soudal). Greipel opened his sprint with a long distance to the finish line and Viviani was able to follow him and then come past him to take the stage victory. Danny van Poppel (Trek Factory Racing) finished second and Jean-Pierre Drucker (BMC Racing Team) third, with Greipel in fourth place.

Result of stage 1
Rank	Rider	Team	Time
1	Elia Viviani (ITA)	Team Sky	4h 06' 18"
2	Danny van Poppel (NED)	Trek Factory Racing	+0"
3	Jean-Pierre Drucker (LUX)	BMC Racing Team	+0"
4	André Greipel (GER)	Lotto–Soudal	+0"
5	Jonas Vangenechten (BEL)	IAM Cycling	+0"
6	Andrea Guardini (ITA)	Astana	+0"
7	Magnus Cort (DEN)	Orica–GreenEDGE	+0"
8	Moreno Hofland (NED)	LottoNL–Jumbo	+0"
9	José Joaquín Rojas (ESP)	Movistar Team	+0"
10	Dylan Groenewegen (NED)	Team Roompot	+0"
Source: ProCyclingStats

General classification after stage 1
Rank	Rider	Team	Time
1	Elia Viviani (ITA)	Team Sky	4h 06' 08"
2	Danny van Poppel (NED)	Trek Factory Racing	+4"
3	Jesper Asselman (NED)	Team Roompot	+4"
4	Laurens De Vreese (BEL)	Astana	+5"
5	Nico Denz (GER)	AG2R La Mondiale	+5"
6	Jean-Pierre Drucker (LUX)	BMC Racing Team	+6"
7	Nathan Haas (AUS)	Cannondale–Garmin	+8"
8	André Greipel (GER)	Lotto–Soudal	+10"
9	Jonas Vangenechten (BEL)	IAM Cycling	+10"
10	Andrea Guardini (ITA)	Astana	+10"
Source: ProCyclingStats

=== Stage 2 ===
11 August 2015 – Breda to Breda, 180 km (110 mi)

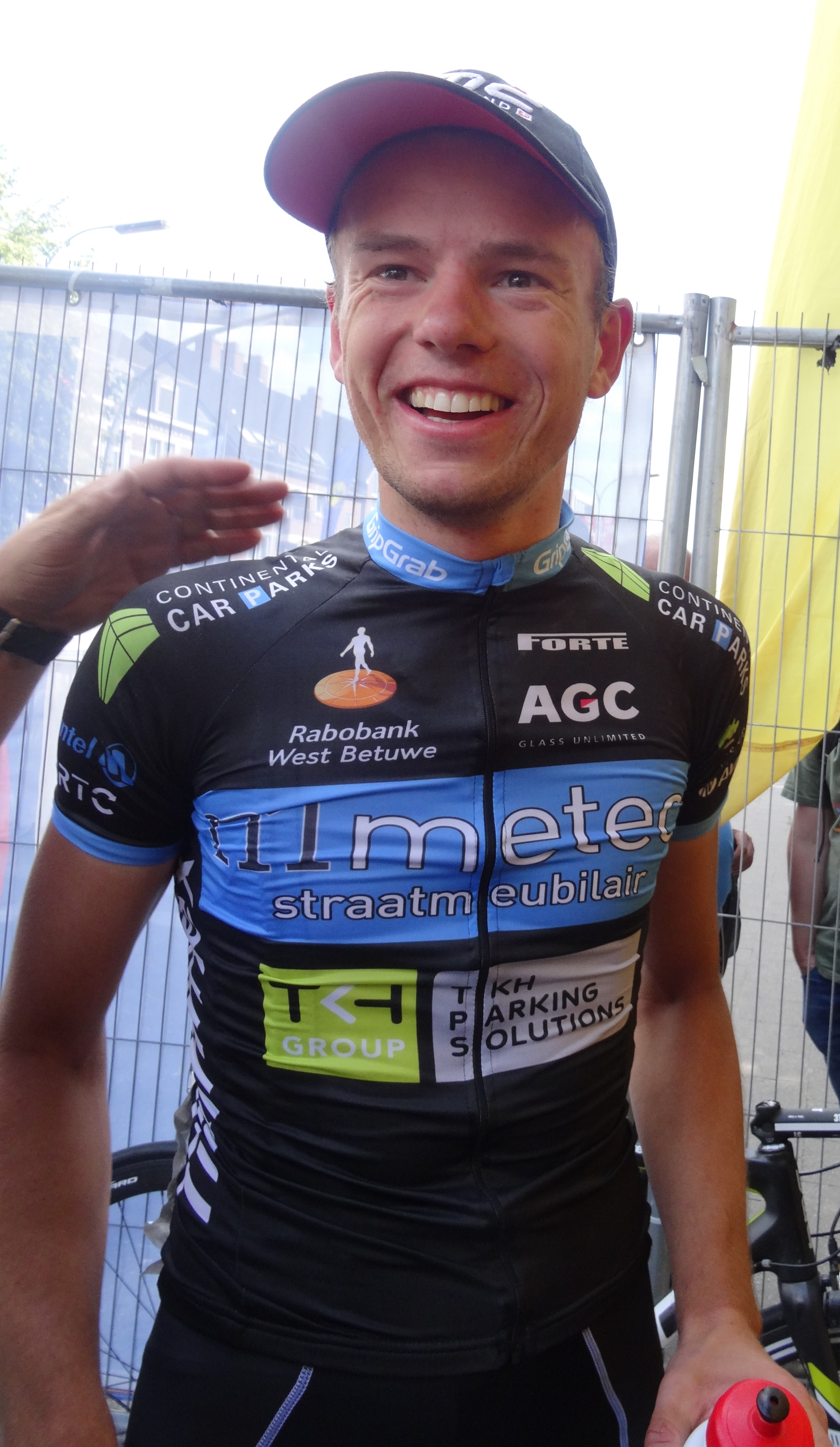
Jesper Asselman (Team Roompot) (photographed in 2014) spent a second day in the breakaway and moved into the race lead due to bonus seconds.

The second stage of the race started in the south of the Netherlands, starting and finishing in Breda. The course was 180.7 kilometres (112.3 mi) in length and, like the first stage, was entirely flat. The stage began with a loop to the south of Breda, around Ulvenhout, then crossed the finish line to begin a much larger loop. This second loop took the riders north to Wagenberg, then south-west to Bosschenhoofd and south-east to Meer, where the Tour entered Belgium for the first time. Here the route turned north again, passing to the east of Ulvenhout and returning to cross the finish line for the second time. The final part of the stage was two laps of a finishing circuit to the east of Breda; these laps included the golden kilometre.

The early breakaway was formed by two riders, Gijs Van Hoecke (Topsport Vlaanderen–Baloise) and, for the second day running, Jesper Asselman. The two riders briefly had a lead of seven minutes, but this was controlled by Team Sky, especially Ian Stannard. Asselman allowed Van Hoecke to win the two early sprints for the combativity jersey and, in return, was allowed to win all three sprints in the golden kilometre. The two riders had a two-minute advantage at this point. In the main peloton, Philippe Gilbert and Andriy Hryvko (Astana) competed for the remaining one-second bonuses: Gilbert won the first and third; Hryvko won the second. Asselman and Van Hoecke were then caught by the peloton—led by Lotto–Soudal—with 15 kilometres (9.3 mi) remaining. Despite several crashes in the final kilometres of the stage, the peloton came to the finish together. Etixx–Quick-Step attempted to lead out Tom Boonen as they entered the final 1 kilometre (0.62 mi), but Lotto-Soudal were able to bring Greipel to the front to open his sprint with 150 metres (490 ft) to the finish line. He finished comfortably ahead of Guarnieri, with Boonen in third.

Asselman finished in 78th place on the stage, in the same time as Greipel. As a result of the bonus seconds won in the golden kilometre, he moved into the overall lead of the race. Greipel was in second place, five seconds behind and on the same time as Elia Viviani. This was the first time that any rider from Team Roompot had worn a leader's jersey in a UCI race.

Result of stage 2
Rank	Rider	Team	Time
1	André Greipel (GER)	Lotto–Soudal	4h 12' 52"
2	Jacopo Guarnieri (ITA)	Team Katusha	+0"
3	Tom Boonen (BEL)	Etixx–Quick-Step	+0"
4	Jean-Pierre Drucker (LUX)	BMC Racing Team	+0"
5	Danny van Poppel (NED)	Trek Factory Racing	+0"
6	Arnaud Démare (FRA)	FDJ	+0"
7	Viacheslav Kuznetsov (RUS)	Team Katusha	+0"
8	Roy Jans (BEL)	Wanty–Groupe Gobert	+0"
9	Sébastien Turgot (FRA)	AG2R La Mondiale	+0"
10	Sacha Modolo (ITA)	Lampre–Merida	+0"
Source: ProCyclingStats

General classification after stage 2
Rank	Rider	Team	Time
1	Jesper Asselman (NED)	Team Roompot	8h 18' 55"
2	André Greipel (GER)	Lotto–Soudal	+5"
3	Elia Viviani (ITA)	Team Sky	+5"
4	Danny van Poppel (NED)	Trek Factory Racing	+9"
5	Jacopo Guarnieri (ITA)	Team Katusha	+9"
6	Gijs Van Hoecke (BEL)	Topsport Vlaanderen–Baloise	+9"
7	Laurens De Vreese (BEL)	Astana	+10"
8	Nico Denz (GER)	AG2R La Mondiale	+10"
9	Jean-Pierre Drucker (LUX)	BMC Racing Team	+11"
10	Tom Boonen (BEL)	Etixx–Quick-Step	+11"
Source: ProCyclingStats

=== Stage 3 ===
12 August 2015 – Beveren to Ardooie, 171.9 km (106.8 mi)

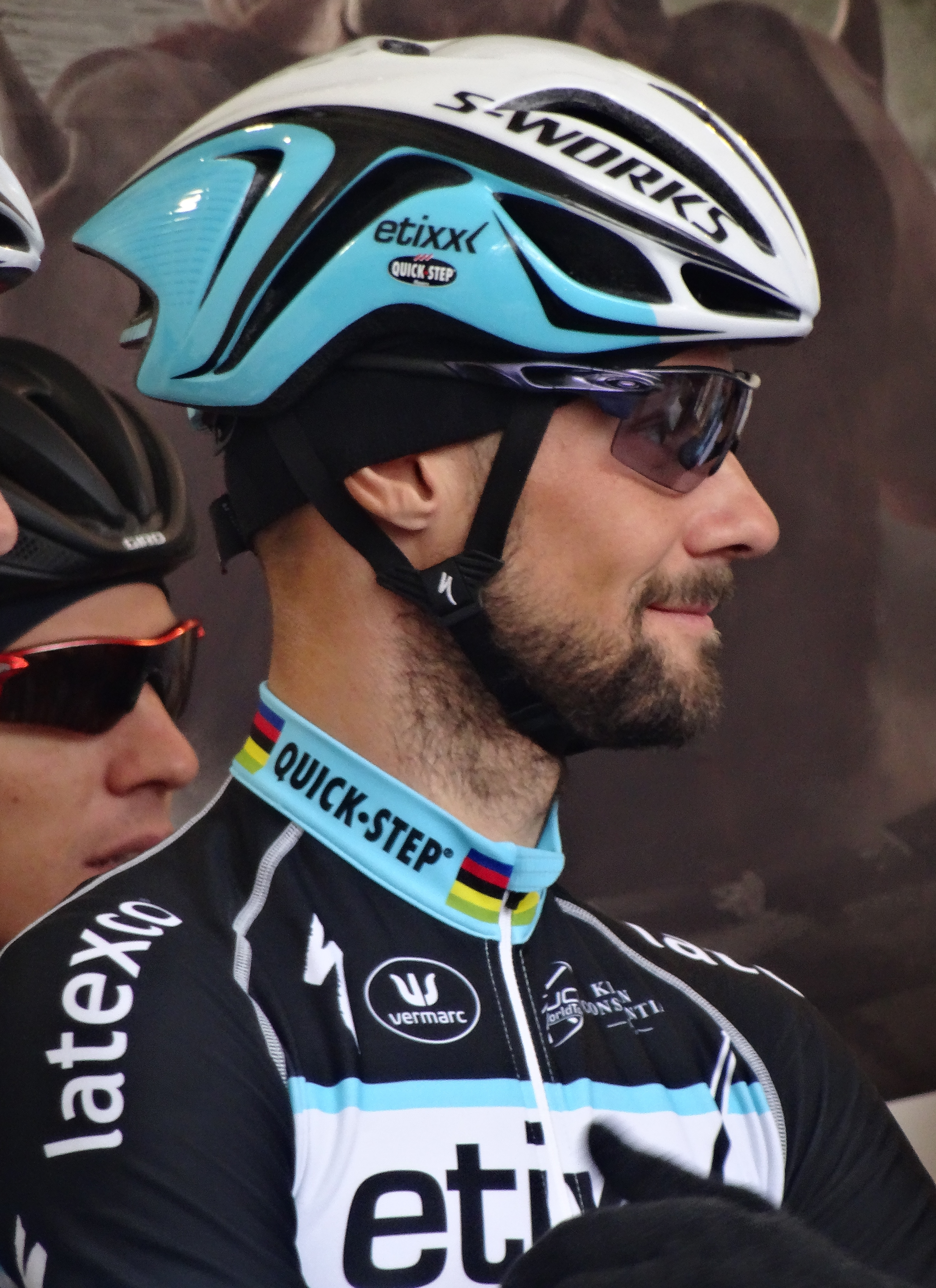
Tom Boonen (Etixx–Quick-Step) (photographed in February 2015) won stage 3.

The third stage of the race took place entirely in Belgium. It was a 171.9-kilometre (106.8 mi) course that contained no classified climbs; it was the final flat stage of the race. The route began in Beveren with a circuit around the municipality. The course then took the riders west as far as Bassevelde, before turning south-west towards Ardooie. After the riders crossed the finish line for the first time, they began two laps of a finishing circuit around the town; these included the golden kilometre.

The breakaway was formed by three riders early in the race. These were David Boucher (FDJ), Edward Theuns (Topsport Vlaanderen–Baloise) and Frederik Veuchelen (Wanty–Groupe Gobert). They built a lead that reached four minutes, but were always under control by the peloton. Team Roompot did a lot of the work at the front of the peloton controlling the breakaway. With 48 kilometres (30 mi) remaining, Gorka Izagirre (Movistar Team) and Hugo Houle (AG2R La Mondiale) touched wheels and crashed after a sharp corner. Houle continued, but Izagirre was forced to abandon the race and was taken to hospital in an ambulance following a blow to his head on a traffic signal. Theuns won all three of the golden kilometre sprints; the nine bonus seconds moved him up to fifth place overall at the end of the stage. The breakaway was caught with 20 kilometres (12 mi) remaining and, apart from a brief attack from Nathan Haas (Cannondale–Garmin), the peloton came to the finish together.

The peloton was led first by Team Giant–Alpecin and then by Lotto–Soudal and Etixx–Quick-Step. The peloton split slightly due to Etixx–Quick-Step's work. Arnaud Démare (FDJ) was the first to start sprinting. Tom Boonen, however, was able to follow him, despite clashing wheels at one point, and came past in the final metres to take the stage victory. Démare was second with Viviani third. Boonen moved up into second place overall following the stage, one second behind Asselman and on the same time as Viviani.

After the stage, Boucher was thrown out of the race by his team. He had recently been told that his contract would not be renewed and had disobeyed team orders not to go in the day's breakaway.

Result of stage 3
Rank	Rider	Team	Time
1	Tom Boonen (BEL)	Etixx–Quick-Step	3hr 54' 25"
2	Arnaud Démare (FRA)	FDJ	+0"
3	Elia Viviani (ITA)	Team Sky	+0"
4	Andrea Guardini (ITA)	Astana	+0"
5	Dylan Groenewegen (NED)	Team Roompot	+0"
6	André Greipel (GER)	Lotto–Soudal	+0"
7	Rüdiger Selig (GER)	Team Katusha	+0"
8	Sacha Modolo (ITA)	Lampre–Merida	+0"
9	Danny van Poppel (NED)	Trek Factory Racing	+0"
10	Roy Jans (BEL)	Wanty–Groupe Gobert	+0"
Source: ProCyclingStats

General classification after stage 3
Rank	Rider	Team	Time
1	Jesper Asselman (NED)	Team Roompot	12hr 13' 20"
2	Tom Boonen (BEL)	Etixx–Quick-Step	+1"
3	Elia Viviani (ITA)	Team Sky	+1"
4	André Greipel (GER)	Lotto–Soudal	+5"
5	Edward Theuns (BEL)	Topsport Vlaanderen–Baloise	+6"
6	Danny van Poppel (NED)	Trek Factory Racing	+9"
7	Arnaud Démare (FRA)	FDJ	+9"
8	Jacopo Guarnieri (ITA)	Team Katusha	+9"
9	Gijs Van Hoecke (BEL)	Topsport Vlaanderen–Baloise	+9"
10	Frederik Veuchelen (BEL)	Wanty–Groupe Gobert	+9"
Source: ProCyclingStats

=== Stage 4 ===
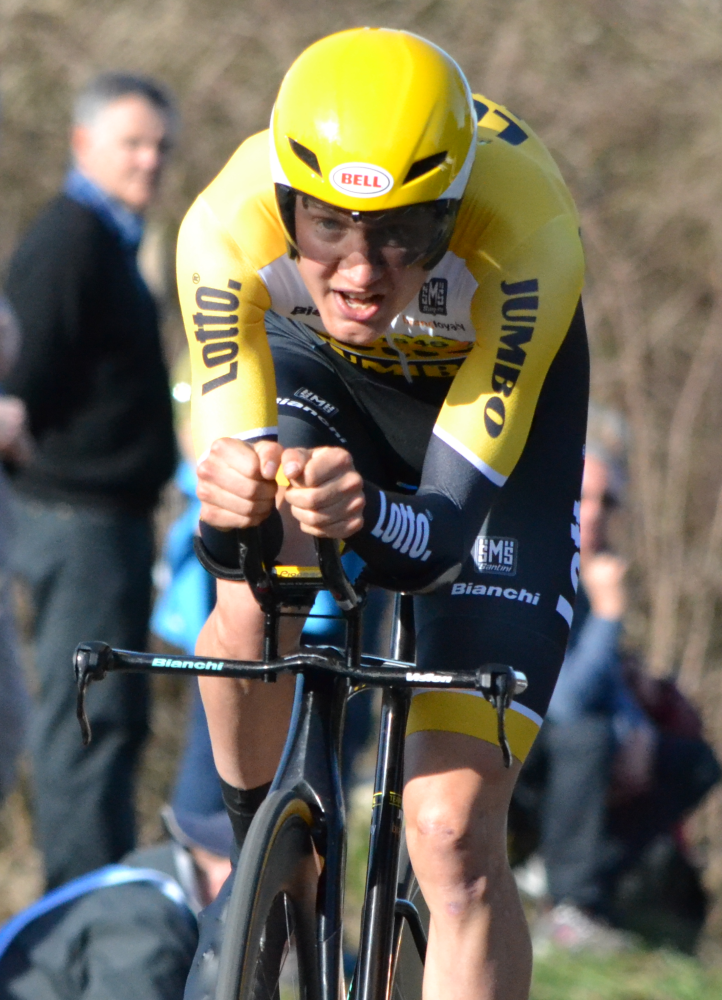
Wilco Kelderman (LottoNL–Jumbo), photographed in the time trial at Paris–Nice, came second in stage 5.

13 August 2015 – Hoogerheide to Hoogerheide, 13.9 km (8.6 mi) (ITT)

Stage 4 was a 13.9-kilometre (8.6 mi) individual time trial around Hoogerheide in the Netherlands. The course was fairly flat, with a slight downhill section towards the start and a gentle uphill section towards the finish, the Rijzendeweg.

An early leading time was set by Adriano Malori (Movistar Team), with a time of 16' 40" and an average speed of 49.99 km/h (31.06 mph). Soon afterwards, however, that time was beaten by Jos van Emden (LottoNL–Jumbo). Van Emden was seven seconds quicker than Malori and was the first rider to complete the course at an average speed of over 50 km/h (31 mph). The only other rider to come close to Van Emden's time was his teammate Wilco Kelderman, who finished the course five seconds behind to take second place. Van Emden won the stage, the first WorldTour victory of the year for LottoNL–Jumbo. Van Emden also moved into the overall lead of the race.

Several other contenders for overall victory finished the course in good times. These included BMC's Greg Van Avermaet and Philippe Gilbert and Astana's Lars Boom. Etixx–Quick-Step's riders were less successful, however. Their best-placed rider was Julian Alaphillippe, 41 seconds behind Van Emden. Niki Terpstra, who had been considered a favourite for the overall victory, suffered mechanical problems, changed bikes twice and finished 1' 26" back.

Result of stage 4
Rank	Rider	Team	Time
1	Jos van Emden (NED)	LottoNL–Jumbo	16' 34"
2	Wilco Kelderman (NED)	LottoNL–Jumbo	+5"
3	Adriano Malori (ITA)	Movistar Team	+7"
4	Lars Boom (NED)	Astana	+7"
5	Matthias Brändle (AUT)	IAM Cycling	+11"
6	Greg Van Avermaet (BEL)	BMC Racing Team	+14"
7	Manuel Quinziato (ITA)	BMC Racing Team	+16"
8	Philippe Gilbert (BEL)	BMC Racing Team	+20"
9	Michael Hepburn (AUS)	Orica–GreenEDGE	+21"
10	Michael Rogers (AUS)	Tinkoff–Saxo	+21"
Source: ProCyclingStats

General classification after stage 4
Rank	Rider	Team	Time
1	Jos van Emden (NED)	LottoNL–Jumbo	12hr 30' 9"
2	Wilco Kelderman (NED)	LottoNL–Jumbo	+5"
3	Adriano Malori (ITA)	Movistar Team	+7"
4	Lars Boom (NED)	Astana	+7"
5	Matthias Brändle (AUT)	IAM Cycling	+11"
6	Greg Van Avermaet (BEL)	BMC Racing Team	+14"
7	Manuel Quinziato (ITA)	BMC Racing Team	+16"
8	Philippe Gilbert (BEL)	BMC Racing Team	+18"
9	Michael Hepburn (AUS)	Orica–GreenEDGE	+21"
10	Michael Rogers (AUS)	Tinkoff–Saxo	+21"
Source: ProCyclingStats

=== Stage 5 ===
14 August 2015 – Riemst to Sittard-Geleen, 179.6 km (111.6 mi)

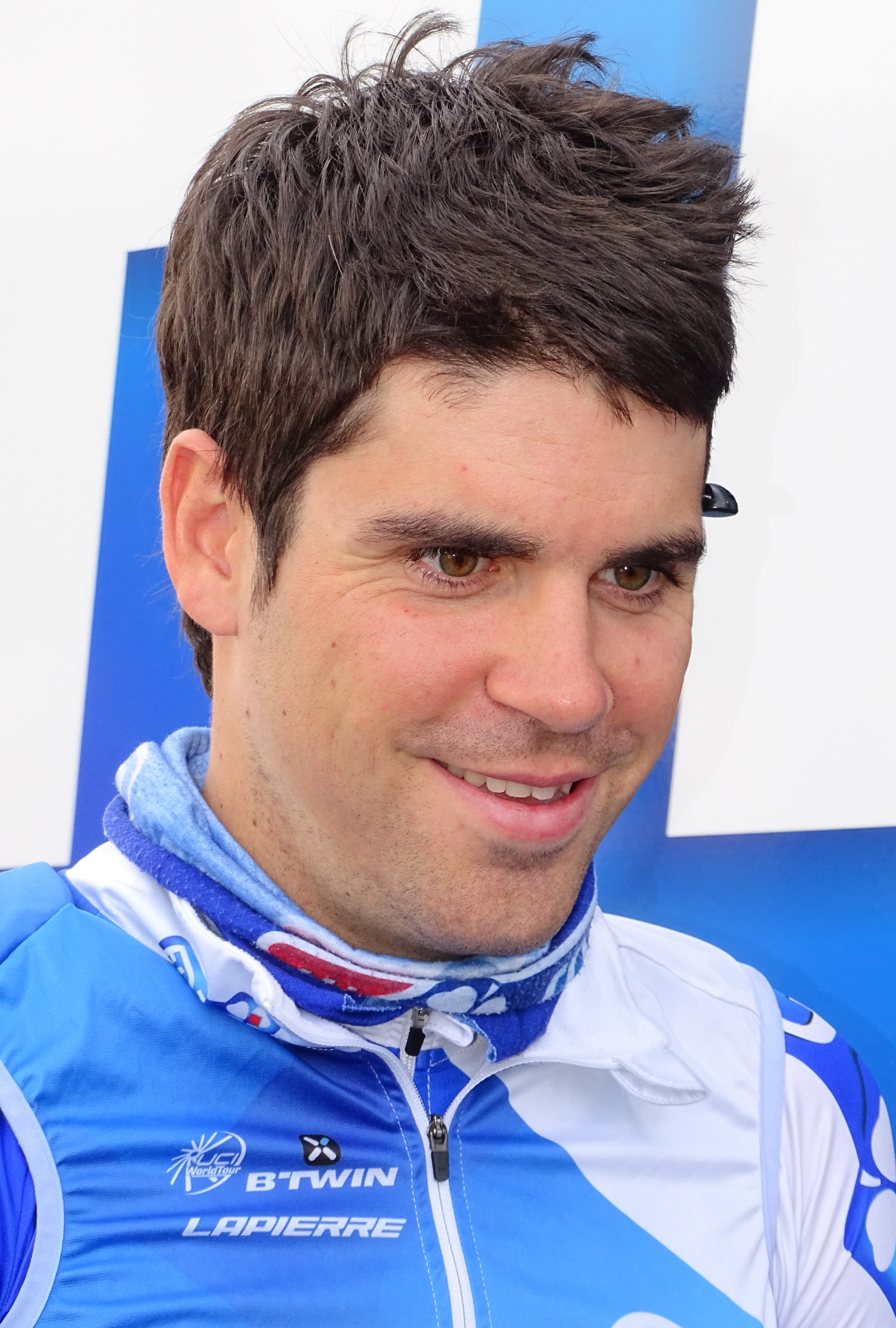
Johan Le Bon (FDJ) won stage 5 from the breakaway (photograph from the 2015 E3 Harelbeke).

The fifth stage of the race was the first hilly stage, with 23 categorised climbs. Many of these climbs (known as hellingen) feature in the Amstel Gold Race. It began in Riemst in the Belgian province of Limburg. The riders completed one and a half laps of a circuit of the town; this included the first climb of the day, the Muizenberg. The course then left the town to the east, crossing the Halembaye, before crossing the border into the Dutch province of Limburg. As the route continued to the east, the riders climbed the Heiweg, the Bergenhuizen, the Camerig and the Schuttebergsweg. The route then turned to the north, though it frequently turned back on itself to take in the various climbs. These included the Mamelisserweg, the Gulperbergweg, the Eyserbosweg, the Hulsberg, the Schanternelsweg, the Fromberg and the Sweikhuizerberg. After this, the route entered two and a half laps of a finishing circuit around Sittard-Geleen. On the two complete laps, the riders climbed the Windraak, the Kollenberg, the Sittarderweg and the Weg langs Stammen. The golden kilometre came on the first lap between the last two of these climbs. After the two complete laps, the riders climbed the Windraak once more, before finishing in Sittard-Geleen.

The breakaway was formed after 60 kilometres (37 mi) by Dylan van Baarle (Cannondale–Garmin) and Johan Le Bon (FDJ). Van Baarle was the better placed of the riders, 29 seconds behind Van Emden, with Le Bon ten seconds further behind. LottoNL–Jumbo controlled the peloton on behalf of Van Emden, assisted by Etixx–Quick-Step. Van Baarle and Le Bon had a lead of five minutes at one point; this was reduced to three and a half minutes with 35 kilometres (22 mi) remaining. The breakaway riders did not contest the bonus seconds in the golden kilometre, though Van Avermaet and Gilbert took the remaining seconds in the main peloton. A heavy thunderstorm started as the riders entered the finishing circuit and disrupted the chasing group, with no team taking responsibility for the chase; Le Bon and van Baarle had a lead of over two minutes as they entered the final lap. Lars Petter Nordhaug (Team Sky) and Lars Boom (Astana) both put in brief attacks but soon sat up. The lead was reduced to just over a minute with 15 kilometres (9.3 mi) remaining; at this point, as the riders crossed the Weg langs Stammen, André Greipel put in an attack and was joined by Wellens, Kelderman, Team Giant–Alpecin's Georg Preidler and Orica–GreenEDGE's Magnus Cort to form a chase group.

The five-man chase group did not work well together, with only Greipel and Wellens consistently working at the front of the group. Kelderman put in a brief surge on the final climb of the Windraak to reduce van Baarle and Le Bon's lead, but the group was not able to bring the leading pair back. Van Baarle and Le Bon worked together until the final 2 kilometres (1.2 mi), when Le Bon attacked in the slipstream of one of the motorbikes following the race. Van Baarle continued chasing but, with both riders exhausted from their efforts through the day, he was unable properly to regain contact. Le Bon was able to hold on in the sprint to take the stage victory, with Van Baarle finishing second on the same time. Cort won the sprint for third, with Wellens and Kelderman on the same time. Kelderman took over the race lead, one second ahead of Le Bon, with Van Emden dropping to fourth.

Result of stage 5
Rank	Rider	Team	Time
1	Johan Le Bon (FRA)	FDJ	4h 13' 50"
2	Dylan van Baarle (NED)	Cannondale–Garmin	+0"
3	Magnus Cort (DEN)	Orica–GreenEDGE	+9"
4	Tim Wellens (BEL)	Lotto–Soudal	+9"
5	Wilco Kelderman (NED)	LottoNL–Jumbo	+9"
6	André Greipel (GER)	Lotto–Soudal	+ 11"
7	Georg Preidler (AUT)	Team Giant–Alpecin	+ 15"
8	Tiesj Benoot (BEL)	Lotto–Soudal	+ 27"
9	Philippe Gilbert (BEL)	BMC Racing Team	+ 27"
10	Lars Boom (NED)	Astana	+ 27"
Source: ProCyclingStats

General classification after stage 5
Rank	Rider	Team	Time
1	Wilco Kelderman (NED)	LottoNL–Jumbo	16hr 44' 13"
2	Dylan van Baarle (NED)	Cannondale–Garmin	+1"
3	Johan Le Bon (FRA)	FDJ	+8"
4	Jos van Emden (NED)	LottoNL–Jumbo	+13"
5	Tim Wellens (BEL)	Lotto–Soudal	+19"
6	Lars Boom (NED)	Astana	+20"
7	Greg Van Avermaet (BEL)	BMC Racing Team	+26"
8	Manuel Quinziato (ITA)	BMC Racing Team	+29"
9	Philippe Gilbert (BEL)	BMC Racing Team	+29"
10	Michael Rogers (AUS)	Tinkoff–Saxo	+34"
Source: ProCyclingStats

=== Stage 6 ===
15 August 2015 – Heerlen to Houffalize, 208.6 km (129.6 mi)

The sixth stage was another hilly stage, with 14 climbs coming in 208.6 kilometres (129.6 mi). The race started in the Netherlands, in Heerlen, with a circuit that included the climb of the Bergseweg. The route left the town to the south, crossing the Mamelisserweg and the Schuttebergsweg before entering Belgium. The route continued to the south as it entered the Ardennes. The riders climbed the Col de Spitzberg, the Côte la Firme Libert and the Côte de Wanneranval on the way to the finishing town of Houffalize. The course first climbed the Côte Saint-Roch; this climb is part of the Liège–Bastogne–Liège course and is 1 kilometre (0.62 mi) in length with an average gradient of 11%. The route loops around to the south of the town before entering two laps of a finishing circuit. The circuit crossed the Côte Saint-Roch again, then the Rue Bois des Moines, the Côte d'Achouffe and the Côte Petite Mormont, before finishing in Houffalize. The significant difference from previous year's editions of the Eneco Tour was the absence of La Redoute from the finish.

The day's early breakaway was formed by Jan Polanc (Lampre–Merida), Matthias Brändle (IAM Cycling), Nikias Arndt (Team Giant–Alpecin), Sébastien Turgot (AG2R La Mondiale) and Jérôme Baugnies (Wanty–Groupe Gobert). Though they had a four-minute lead at one stage, they were caught as the race entered the finishing circuit. Andrey Amador (Movistar Team) was the first to attack from the peloton, with numerous other attacks following, and a new, eight-man leading group was formed. This did not initially include Kelderman, the race leader, but he was able to rejoin the lead group as it grew to nineteen riders. Brändle attacked again and briefly led the race, but he was caught by work from Van Avermaet. Simon Geschke (Team Giant–Alpecin) attacked and was joined by Michael Rogers (Tinkoff–Saxo). Wellens soon attacked from the group behind; he caught and passed Geschke and Rogers on the Côte Saint-Roch, then won nine seconds in the sprints in the golden kilometre. Van Avermaet attacked from the main group; he too passed Geschke and Rogers to take second place in all three sprints and win six seconds.

Kelderman was once again dropped from the main group and was then again able to rejoin it, but the group was not able to chase Wellens down. Geschke and Van Avermaet rode together, while Jan Bakelants (AG2R La Mondiale) and Tom-Jelte Slagter (Cannondale–Garmin) attacked from the main group. Wellens's lead extended during the downhill run into Houffalize; he won the stage by 49 seconds ahead of Van Avermaet, with Geschke third. Wellens moved into the overall lead, 1' 03" ahead of Van Avermaet, with Kelderman dropping to third.

Result of stage 6
Rank	Rider	Team	Time
1	Tim Wellens (BEL)	Lotto–Soudal	5hr 28' 46"
2	Greg Van Avermaet (BEL)	BMC Racing Team	+49"
3	Simon Geschke (GER)	Team Giant–Alpecin	+51"
4	Jan Bakelants (BEL)	AG2R La Mondiale	+1' 03"
5	Tom-Jelte Slagter (NED)	Cannondale–Garmin	+1' 07"
6	Philippe Gilbert (BEL)	BMC Racing Team	+1' 13"
7	Tiesj Benoot (BEL)	Lotto–Soudal	+1' 13"
8	Fabio Felline (ITA)	Trek Factory Racing	+1' 13"
9	Andriy Hryvko (UKR)	Astana	+1' 13"
10	Wilco Kelderman (NED)	LottoNL–Jumbo	+1' 17"
Source: ProCyclingStats

General classification after stage 6
Rank	Rider	Team	Time
1	Tim Wellens (BEL)	Lotto–Soudal	22hr 12' 59"
2	Greg Van Avermaet (BEL)	BMC Racing Team	+1' 03"
3	Wilco Kelderman (NED)	LottoNL–Jumbo	+1' 17"
4	Philippe Gilbert (BEL)	BMC Racing Team	+1' 40"
5	Fabio Felline (ITA)	Trek Factory Racing	+1' 48"
6	Michael Rogers (AUS)	Tinkoff–Saxo	+1' 51"
7	Andriy Hryvko (UKR)	Astana	+1' 54"
8	Christopher Juul-Jensen (DEN)	Tinkoff–Saxo	+2' 05"
9	Tiesj Benoot (BEL)	Lotto–Soudal	+2' 13"
10	Jan Bakelants (BEL)	AG2R La Mondiale	+2' 13"
Source: ProCyclingStats

=== Stage 7 ===
16 August 2015 – Sint-Pieters-Leeuw to Geraardsbergen, 193.8 km (120.4 mi)

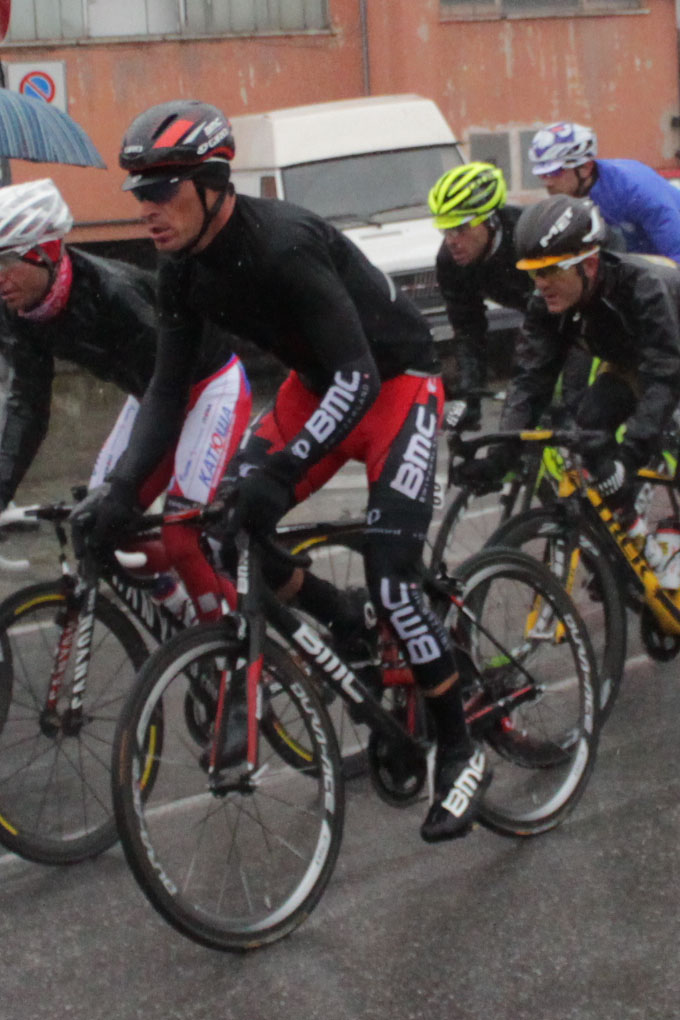
Manuel Quinziato (BMC Racing Team) won his second professional victory on stage 7 (pictured at the 2013 Milan–San Remo).

The final stage of the race took place entirely in Belgium. It was a 193.8-kilometre (120.4 mi) route that started in Sint-Pieters-Leeuw on the outskirts of Brussels and ended in Geraardsbergen in the area of East Flanders known as the Flemish Ardennes. The principal feature of stage 6 was the series of cobbled climbs. The stage began with a circuit in Sint-Pieters-Leeuw, then headed west. The first climb was the Pelikaanberg, but this was the only climb in the first 80 kilometres (50 mi) of racing. The final 110 kilometres (68 mi) included 16 climbs. The first of these, the Mont, came as the route turned north towards Oudenaarde and was followed by the Kanarieberg and the Edelareberg. Here the riders turned to the east and crossed a series of climbs also used in the Tour of Flanders: the Leberg, the Berendries and the Valkenberg. The riders then crossed the Tenbosse before entering the two and a half laps of the finishing circuit. This included four climbs: the Denderoordberg, the Muur van Geraardsbergen (the final climb in the Tour of Flanders until 2012), the Bosberg and the Okerzelerstraat. After two complete laps, the route finished halfway up the Muur van Geraardsbergen.

There was a fourteen-rider breakaway that formed at the beginning of the day's racing. This group never had a large advantage and broke up on the first ascent of the Muur. The lead group after the climb was formed of three men: Manuel Quinziato (BMC Racing Team), Björn Leukemans (Wanty–Groupe Gobert) and Yves Lampaert (Etixx–Quick-Step). Attacks came from the main group and eventually a ten-man chasing group was formed. The leading three riders kept a lead of approximately a minute as riders came and went from the chasing group; the chasers were caught by the main peloton (led by Lotto–Soudal) with approximately 10 kilometres (6.2 mi) to the finish line.

Quinziato, the weakest climber of the three leading riders, attacked at the summit of the Denderoordberg, the penultimate climb of the day, quickly dropping Lampaert. Leukemans attempted to hold Quinziato's wheel, but was dropped on the flat. Quinziato soon had half a minute's lead and entered the base of the Muur alone. He had more difficulty on the climb, however: as Leukemans and Lampaert reached the cobbles, they quickly began to catch him. Quinziato eventually crossed the line with just a few seconds to spare. This was the second professional victory of his career, nine years after his first, which had come in the 2006 Eneco Tour. Wellens finished in a large group 42 seconds back and sealed his overall victory in the race.

Result of stage 7
Rank	Rider	Team	Time
1	Manuel Quinziato (ITA)	BMC Racing Team	4hr 18' 18"
2	Björn Leukemans (BEL)	Wanty–Groupe Gobert	+3"
3	Yves Lampaert (BEL)	Etixx–Quick-Step	+8"
4	Greg Van Avermaet (BEL)	BMC Racing Team	+38"
5	Julian Alaphilippe (FRA)	Etixx–Quick-Step	+38"
6	Tiesj Benoot (BEL)	Lotto–Soudal	+40"
7	Filippo Pozzato (ITA)	Lampre–Merida	+40"
8	Jan Bakelants (BEL)	AG2R La Mondiale	+42"
9	Philippe Gilbert (BEL)	BMC Racing Team	+42"
10	Magnus Cort (DEN)	Orica–GreenEDGE	+42"
Source: ProCyclingStats

Result of general classification
Rank	Rider	Team	Time
1	Tim Wellens (BEL)	Lotto–Soudal	26hr 31' 59"
2	Greg Van Avermaet (BEL)	BMC Racing Team	+59"
3	Wilco Kelderman (NED)	LottoNL–Jumbo	+1' 17"
4	Philippe Gilbert (BEL)	BMC Racing Team	+1' 40"
5	Fabio Felline (ITA)	Trek Factory Racing	+1' 48"
6	Andriy Hryvko (UKR)	Astana	+1' 54"
7	Michael Rogers (AUS)	Tinkoff–Saxo	+2' 02"
8	Tiesj Benoot (BEL)	Lotto–Soudal	+2' 11"
9	Christopher Juul-Jensen (DEN)	Tinkoff–Saxo	+2' 11"
10	Julian Alaphilippe (FRA)	Etixx–Quick-Step	+2' 11"
Source: ProCyclingStats

== Classification leadership table ==
There were four principal classifications in the race. The first of these was the general classification, calculated by adding up the time each rider took to ride each stage. Time bonuses were applied for winning stages (10, 6 and 4 seconds to the first three riders) and for the three "golden kilometre" sprints on each stage. At each of these sprints, the first three riders were given 3-, 2- and 1-second bonuses respectively. The rider with the lowest cumulative time was the winner of the general classification. The rider leading the classification won a white jersey.

There was also a points classification. On each road stage the riders were awarded points for finishing in the top 10 places, with other points awarded for intermediate sprints. The rider with the most accumulated points was the leader of the classification and won the red jersey. The combativity classification was based solely on points won at the intermediate sprints; the leading rider won the green jersey. The final stage was a team classification: on each stage the times of the best three riders on each team were added up. The team with the lowest cumulative time over the seven stages won the team classification.

Stage	Winner	General classification	Points classification	Combativity classification	Team classification
1	Elia Viviani	Elia Viviani	Elia Viviani	Nathan Haas	Team Roompot
2	André Greipel	Jesper Asselman	André Greipel	Jesper Asselman	Team Roompot
3	Tom Boonen	Jesper Asselman	André Greipel	Jesper Asselman	Team Roompot
4	Jos van Emden	Jos van Emden	André Greipel	Jesper Asselman	LottoNL–Jumbo
5	Johan Le Bon	Wilco Kelderman	André Greipel	Jesper Asselman	LottoNL–Jumbo
6	Tim Wellens	Tim Wellens	André Greipel	Gijs Van Hoecke	Lotto–Soudal
7	Manuel Quinziato	Tim Wellens	André Greipel	Gijs Van Hoecke	Lotto–Soudal
Final		Tim Wellens	André Greipel	Gijs Van Hoecke	Lotto–Soudal
