= 2015 Grand Prix Cycliste de Montréal =

2015 UCI World Tour, race 26 of 28
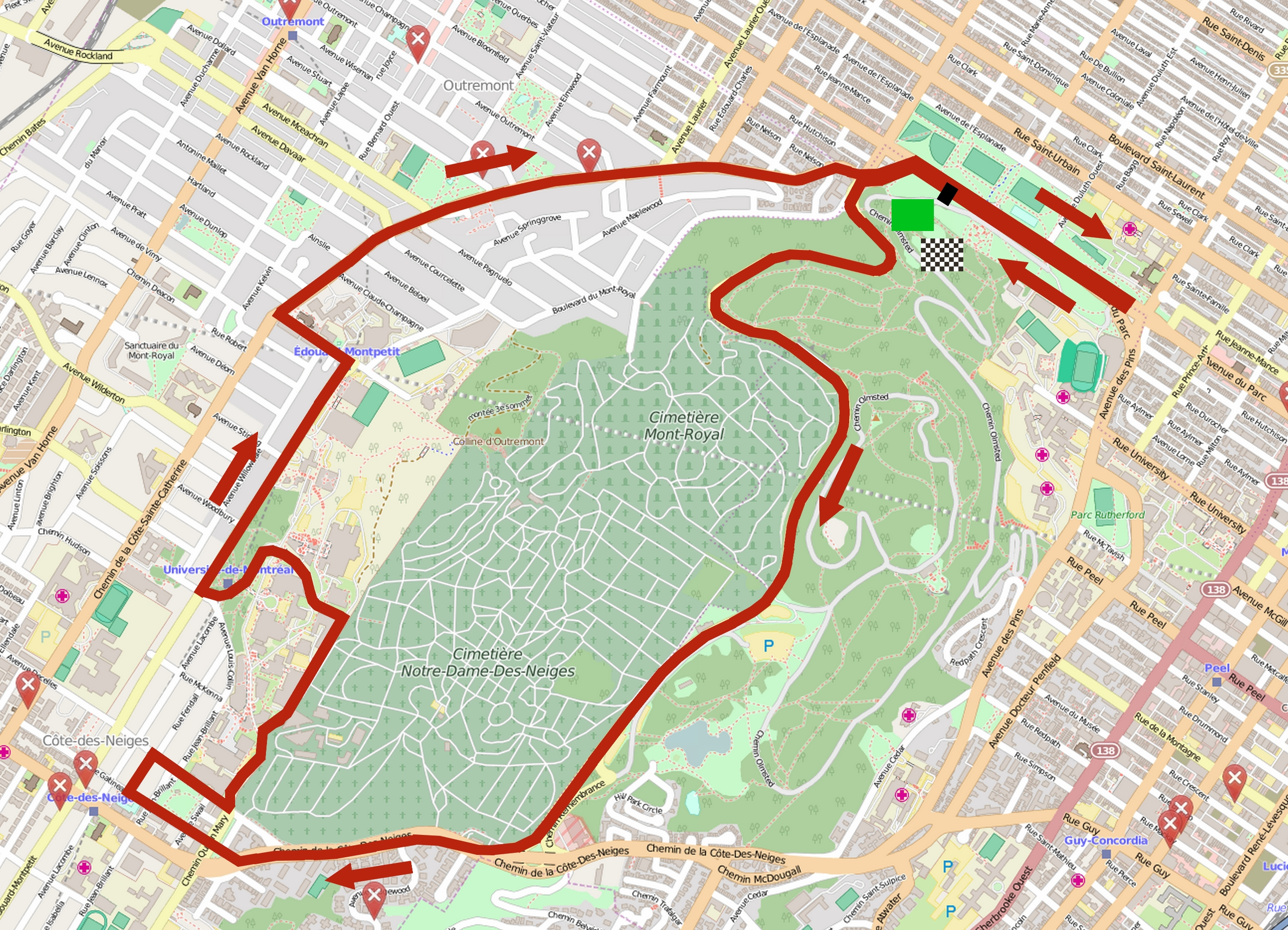

Race details
- Dates: 13 September 2015
- Stages: 1
- Distance: 205.7 km (127.8 mi)
- Winning time: 5h 20' 09"

Results
	Winner	Tim Wellens (BEL)	(Lotto–Soudal)
	Second	Adam Yates (GBR)	(Orica–GreenEDGE)
	Third	Rui Costa (POR)	(Lampre–Merida)

The 2015 Grand Prix Cycliste de Montréal was the sixth edition of the Grand Prix Cycliste de Montréal one-day cycling race. It took place on 13 September and was the twenty-sixth race of the 2015 UCI World Tour.

It was won by Belgian rider Tim Wellens (Lotto–Soudal) in a sprint finish ahead of Adam Yates. Rui Costa won the sprint for the third place.

== Teams ==
As the Grand Prix Cycliste de Québec was a UCI World Tour event, all 17 UCI ProTeams were invited automatically and obligated to send a squad. Three UCI Professional Continental teams (Bora-Argon 18, Drapac, and Team Europcar) and a Canadian national squad also competed in the race, and as such, forming the event's 21-team peloton.

The 21 teams that competed in the race were:

- AG2R La Mondiale
- Astana
- Bora–Argon 18
- BMC Racing Team
- Canada (national team) †
- Cannondale–Garmin
- Drapac Professional Cycling
- Etixx–Quick-Step
- Team Europcar
- FDJ
- Team Giant–Alpecin
- IAM Cycling
- Team Katusha
- Lampre–Merida
- LottoNL–Jumbo
- Lotto–Soudal
- Movistar Team
- Orica–GreenEDGE
- Team Sky
- Tinkoff–Saxo
- Trek Factory Racing

== Results ==
	Cyclist	Team	Time	UCI World Tour Points
1	Tim Wellens (BEL)	Lotto–Soudal	5h 20' 09"	80
2	Adam Yates (GBR)	Orica–GreenEDGE	s.t.	60
3	Rui Costa (POR)	Lampre–Merida	+2"	50
4	Jan Bakelants (BEL)	AG2R La Mondiale	+4"	40
5	Tiesj Benoot (BEL)	Lotto–Soudal	+4"	30
6	Wilco Kelderman (NED)	LottoNL–Jumbo	+5"	22
7	Romain Bardet (FRA)	AG2R La Mondiale	+5"	14
8	Robert Gesink (NED)	LottoNL–Jumbo	+9"	10
9	Philippe Gilbert (BEL)	BMC Racing Team	+9"	6
10	Tom-Jelte Slagter (NED)	Cannondale–Garmin	+9"	2
