= 2024 Clásica Jaén Paraíso Interior =

2024 UCI Europe Tour

Race details
- Dates: 12 February 2024
- Distance: 158.3 km (98.36 mi)
- Winning time: 3h 43' 50"

Results
	Winner	Oier Lazkano (ESP)	(Movistar Team)
	Second	Bastien Tronchon (FRA)	(Decathlon–AG2R La Mondiale)
	Third	Jan Tratnik (SLO)	(Visma–Lease a Bike)

The 2024 Clásica Jaén Paraíso Interior was the third edition of the Clásica Jaén Paraíso Interior road cycling race. It was held on 12 February 2024 in the titular province of Spain as a category 1.1 event on the 2024 UCI Europe Tour calendar.

== Teams ==
Five UCI WorldTeams, seven UCI ProTeams, and two UCI Continental teams made up the fourteen teams that participated in the race.

UCI WorldTeams

- Decathlon–AG2R La Mondiale
- Ineos Grenadiers
- Movistar Team
- Visma–Lease a Bike
- UAE Team Emirates

UCI ProTeams

- Burgos BH
- Caja Rural–Seguros RGA
- Equipo Kern Pharma
- Euskaltel–Euskadi
- Lotto–Dstny
- Q36.5 Pro Cycling Team
- Team Flanders–Baloise

UCI Continental Teams

- Illes Balears Arabay Cycling
- Lidl–Trek Future Racing

== Results ==
Result
Rank	Rider	Team	Time
1	Oier Lazkano (ESP)	Movistar Team	3h 43' 50"
2	Bastien Tronchon (FRA)	Decathlon–AG2R La Mondiale	+ 28"
3	Jan Tratnik (SLO)	Visma–Lease a Bike	+ 28"
4	Tim Wellens (BEL)	UAE Team Emirates	+ 28"
5	Nicolas Prodhomme (FRA)	Decathlon–AG2R La Mondiale	+ 42"
6	Sepp Kuss (USA)	Visma–Lease a Bike	+ 47"
7	Michał Kwiatkowski (POL)	Ineos Grenadiers	+ 1' 22"
8	Carlos Canal (ESP)	Movistar Team	+ 1' 22"
9	Cedric Beullens (BEL)	Lotto–Dstny	+ 1' 22"
10	Marc Soler (ESP)	UAE Team Emirates	+ 1' 22"
