= 2014 Eneco Tour =

2014 UCI World Tour, race 21 of 29

Race details
- Dates: 11–17 August 2014
- Stages: 7
- Distance: 1,067.4 km (663.3 mi)
- Winning time: 25h 30' 15"

Results
Jersey awarded to the overall winner	Winner	Tim Wellens (Belgium)	(Lotto–Belisol)
	Second	Lars Boom (Netherlands)	(Belkin Pro Cycling)
	Third	Tom Dumoulin (Netherlands)	(Giant–Shimano)
Jersey awarded to the points classification winner	Points	Tom Dumoulin (Netherlands)	(Giant–Shimano)
Jersey awarded to the sprints classification winner	Sprints	Kenneth Vanbilsen (Belgium)	(Topsport Vlaanderen–Baloise)
	Team	Garmin–Sharp	

The 2014 Eneco Tour was the tenth running of the Eneco Tour cycling stage race. It started on 11 August in Terneuzen and ended on 17 August in Sittard-Geleen, after seven stages. It was the 21st race of the 2014 UCI World Tour season.

== Teams ==
All 18 teams in the UCI's Proteam category were entitled, and obliged, to enter the race. Two UCI Professional Continental teams were also invited.

- Ag2r–La Mondiale
- Astana
- BMC Racing Team
- FDJ.fr
- Movistar Team
- Team Sky
- Giant–Shimano
- Cannondale
- Garmin–Sharp
- Omega Pharma–Quick-Step
- Wanty–Groupe Gobert†
- Astana
- Lampre–Merida
- Orica–GreenEDGE
- Team Katusha
- Belkin Pro Cycling
- Team Europcar
- Lotto–Belisol
- Trek Factory Racing
- Tinkoff–Saxo
- Topsport Vlaanderen–Baloise†

†: Invited Pro-Continental teams

== Schedule ==
The race consisted of seven stages, including one individual time trial stage. Just as the previous season, the race finished with a stage including the Muur van Geraardsbergen, which was famous for its presence in the Tour of Flanders single-day race.

Stage	Date	Course	Distance	Type	Winner
1	11 August	Terneuzen (Netherlands) to Terneuzen	183.1 km (113.8 mi)	Flat stage	Andrea Guardini (ITA)
2	12 August	Waalwijk (Netherlands) to Nieuwkuijk (Netherlands)	175.8 km (109.2 mi)	Flat stage	Zdeněk Štybar (CZE)
3	13 August	Breda (Netherlands) to Breda	9.6 km (6.0 mi)	Individual time trial	Tom Dumoulin (NED)
4	14 August	Koksijde (Belgium) to Ardooie (Belgium)	179.1 km (111.3 mi)	Flat stage	Nacer Bouhanni (FRA)
5	15 August	Geraardsbergen (Belgium) to Geraardsbergen	162.5 km (101.0 mi)	Intermediate stage	Greg Van Avermaet (BEL)
6	16 August	Heerlen (Netherlands) to Aywaille (Belgium)	173.9 km (108.1 mi)	Intermediate stage	Tim Wellens (BEL)
7	17 August	Riemst (Belgium) to Sittard-Geleen (Netherlands)	183.4 km (114.0 mi)	Intermediate stage	Guillaume Van Keirsbulck (BEL)
Total		1,067.4 km (663.3 mi)			

== Stages ==
=== Stage 1 ===
11 August 2014 — Terneuzen (Netherlands) to Terneuzen, 183.1 km (113.8 mi)

Stage 1 Result

	Rider	Team	Time
1	Andrea Guardini (ITA)	Astana	4h 14' 33"
2	Yohann Gène (FRA)	Team Europcar	+ 0"
3	Davide Cimolai (ITA)	Lampre–Merida	+ 0"
4	Jens Debusschere (BEL)	Lotto–Belisol	+ 0"
5	Boy van Poppel (NED)	Trek Factory Racing	+ 0"
6	Alexander Porsev (RUS)	Team Katusha	+ 0"
7	Tom Dumoulin (NED)	Giant–Shimano	+ 0"
8	Matteo Trentin (ITA)	Omega Pharma–Quick-Step	+ 0"
9	Sep Vanmarcke (BEL)	Belkin Pro Cycling	+ 0"
10	Michael Van Staeyen (BEL)	Topsport Vlaanderen–Baloise	+ 0"

General Classification after Stage 1

	Rider	Team	Time
1	Andrea Guardini (ITA)	Astana	4h 14' 23"
2	Yohann Gène (FRA)	Team Europcar	+ 4"
3	Laurens De Vreese (BEL)	Wanty–Groupe Gobert	+ 5"
4	Davide Cimolai (ITA)	Lampre–Merida	+ 6"
5	Lars Boom (NED)	Belkin Pro Cycling	+ 7"
6	Alex Dowsett (GBR)	Movistar Team	+ 8"
7	Kenneth Vanbilsen (BEL)	Topsport Vlaanderen–Baloise	+ 8"
8	Philippe Gilbert (BEL)	BMC Racing Team	+ 9"
9	Jens Debusschere (BEL)	Lotto–Belisol	+ 10"
10	Boy van Poppel (NED)	Trek Factory Racing	+ 10"

=== Stage 2 ===
12 August 2014 — Waalwijk (Netherlands) to Vlijmen (Netherlands), 175.8 km (109.2 mi)

Stage 2 Result

	Rider	Team	Time
1	Zdeněk Štybar (CZE)	Omega Pharma–Quick-Step	4h 06' 16"
2	Lars Boom (NED)	Belkin Pro Cycling	+ 0"
3	Sep Vanmarcke (BEL)	Belkin Pro Cycling	+ 0"
4	Marco Marcato (ITA)	Cannondale	+ 0"
5	Manuel Quinziato (ITA)	BMC Racing Team	+ 0"
6	Roy Jans (BEL)	Wanty–Groupe Gobert	+ 0"
7	Davide Appollonio (ITA)	Ag2r–La Mondiale	+ 0"
8	Bauke Mollema (NED)	Belkin Pro Cycling	+ 0"
9	Julien Vermote (BEL)	Omega Pharma–Quick-Step	+ 0"
10	Stig Broeckx (BEL)	Lotto–Belisol	+ 0"

General Classification after Stage 2

	Rider	Team	Time
1	Zdeněk Štybar (CZE)	Omega Pharma–Quick-Step	8h 20' 39"
2	Lars Boom (NED)	Belkin Pro Cycling	+ 1"
3	Sep Vanmarcke (BEL)	Belkin Pro Cycling	+ 6"
4	Pavel Brutt (RUS)	Team Katusha	+ 7"
5	Philippe Gilbert (BEL)	BMC Racing Team	+ 9"
6	Marco Marcato (ITA)	Cannondale	+ 10"
7	Nikolay Trusov (RUS)	Tinkoff–Saxo	+ 10"
8	Roy Jans (BEL)	Wanty–Groupe Gobert	+ 10"
9	Aidis Kruopis (LTU)	Orica–GreenEDGE	+ 10"
10	Jens Keukeleire (BEL)	Orica–GreenEDGE	+ 10"

=== Stage 3 ===
13 August 2014 — Breda (Netherlands) to Breda, 9.6 km (6.0 mi), individual time trial (ITT)

Stage 3 Result

	Rider	Team	Time
1	Tom Dumoulin (NED)	Giant–Shimano	10' 55"
2	Fabian Cancellara (SUI)	Trek Factory Racing	+ 2"
3	Geraint Thomas (GBR)	Team Sky	+ 10"
4	Manuel Quinziato (ITA)	BMC Racing Team	+ 14"
5	Jesse Sergent (NZL)	Trek Factory Racing	+ 15"
6	Steve Cummings (GBR)	BMC Racing Team	+ 17"
7	Andriy Hrivko (UKR)	Astana	+ 17"
8	Moreno Moser (ITA)	Cannondale	+ 18"
9	Lars Boom (NED)	Belkin Pro Cycling	+ 19"
10	Rohan Dennis (AUS)	BMC Racing Team	+ 20"

General Classification after Stage 3

	Rider	Team	Time
1	Lars Boom (NED)	Belkin Pro Cycling	8h 31' 54"
2	Tom Dumoulin (NED)	Giant–Shimano	+ 4"
3	Manuel Quinziato (ITA)	BMC Racing Team	+ 4"
4	Andriy Hrivko (UKR)	Astana	+ 7"
5	Zdeněk Štybar (CZE)	Omega Pharma–Quick-Step	+ 12"
6	Geraint Thomas (GBR)	Team Sky	+ 14"
7	Niki Terpstra (NED)	Omega Pharma–Quick-Step	+ 18"
8	Kristijan Koren (SLO)	Cannondale	+ 19"
9	Sep Vanmarcke (BEL)	Belkin Pro Cycling	+ 21"
10	Philippe Gilbert (BEL)	BMC Racing Team	+ 21"

=== Stage 4 ===
14 August 2014 — Koksijde (Belgium) to Ardooie (Belgium), 179.1 km (111.3 mi)

Stage 4 Result

	Rider	Team	Time
1	Nacer Bouhanni (FRA)	FDJ.fr	4h 13' 59"
2	Luka Mezgec (SLO)	Giant–Shimano	+ 0"
3	Giacomo Nizzolo (ITA)	Trek Factory Racing	+ 0"
4	Michael Van Staeyen (BEL)	Topsport Vlaanderen–Baloise	+ 0"
5	Jens Debusschere (BEL)	Lotto–Belisol	+ 0"
6	Andrea Guardini (ITA)	Astana	+ 0"
7	Tyler Farrar (USA)	Garmin–Sharp	+ 0"
8	Yohann Gène (FRA)	Team Europcar	+ 0"
9	Roy Jans (BEL)	Wanty–Groupe Gobert	+ 0"
10	Nikolay Trusov (RUS)	Tinkoff–Saxo	+ 0"

General Classification after Stage 4

	Rider	Team	Time
1	Lars Boom (NED)	Belkin Pro Cycling	12h 45' 53"
2	Tom Dumoulin (NED)	Giant–Shimano	+ 4"
3	Manuel Quinziato (ITA)	BMC Racing Team	+ 4"
4	Andriy Hrivko (UKR)	Astana	+ 7"
5	Zdeněk Štybar (CZE)	Omega Pharma–Quick-Step	+ 9"
6	Geraint Thomas (GBR)	Team Sky	+ 14"
7	Sep Vanmarcke (BEL)	Belkin Pro Cycling	+ 17"
8	Niki Terpstra (NED)	Omega Pharma–Quick-Step	+ 18"
9	Kristijan Koren (SLO)	Cannondale	+ 19"
10	Jens Keukeleire (BEL)	Orica–GreenEDGE	+ 21"

=== Stage 5 ===
15 August 2014 — Geraardsbergen (Belgium) to Geraardsbergen, 162.5 km (101.0 mi)

Stage 5 Result

	Rider	Team	Time
1	Greg Van Avermaet (BEL)	BMC Racing Team	3h 48' 37"
2	Tom Dumoulin (NED)	Giant–Shimano	+ 1"
3	Pavel Brutt (RUS)	Team Katusha	+ 1"
4	Matti Breschel (DEN)	Tinkoff–Saxo	+ 1"
5	Lars Boom (NED)	Belkin Pro Cycling	+ 1"
6	Niki Terpstra (NED)	Omega Pharma–Quick-Step	+ 6"
7	Geraint Thomas (GBR)	Team Sky	+ 6"
8	Tim Wellens (BEL)	Lotto–Belisol	+ 6"
9	Filippo Pozzato (ITA)	Lampre–Merida	+ 6"
10	Philippe Gilbert (BEL)	BMC Racing Team	+ 6"

General Classification after Stage 5

	Rider	Team	Time
1	Tom Dumoulin (NED)	Giant–Shimano	16h 34' 29"
2	Lars Boom (NED)	Belkin Pro Cycling	+ 2"
3	Manuel Quinziato (ITA)	BMC Racing Team	+ 11"
4	Andriy Hrivko (UKR)	Astana	+ 14"
5	Geraint Thomas (GBR)	Team Sky	+ 21"
6	Pavel Brutt (RUS)	Team Katusha	+ 23"
7	Sep Vanmarcke (BEL)	Belkin Pro Cycling	+ 24"
8	Greg Van Avermaet (BEL)	BMC Racing Team	+ 25"
9	Niki Terpstra (NED)	Omega Pharma–Quick-Step	+ 25"
10	Jens Keukeleire (BEL)	Orica–GreenEDGE	+ 28"

=== Stage 6 ===
16 August 2014 — Heerlen (Netherlands) to Aywaille (Belgium), 173.9 km (108.1 mi)

Stage 6 Result

	Rider	Team	Time
1	Tim Wellens (BEL)	Lotto–Belisol	4h 28' 19"
2	Lars Boom (NED)	Belkin Pro Cycling	+ 50"
3	Greg Van Avermaet (BEL)	BMC Racing Team	+ 52"
4	Tom Dumoulin (NED)	Giant–Shimano	+ 52"
5	Geraint Thomas (GBR)	Team Sky	+ 56"
6	Andriy Hrivko (UKR)	Astana	+ 58"
7	Jelle Vanendert (BEL)	Lotto–Belisol	+ 59"
8	Niki Terpstra (NED)	Omega Pharma–Quick-Step	+ 59"
9	Philippe Gilbert (BEL)	BMC Racing Team	+ 59"
10	Marco Marcato (ITA)	Cannondale	+ 59"

General Classification after Stage 6

	Rider	Team	Time
1	Tim Wellens (BEL)	Lotto–Belisol	21h 03' 27"
2	Lars Boom (NED)	Belkin Pro Cycling	+ 7"
3	Tom Dumoulin (NED)	Giant–Shimano	+ 13"
4	Andriy Hrivko (UKR)	Astana	+ 33"
5	Greg Van Avermaet (BEL)	BMC Racing Team	+ 34"
6	Geraint Thomas (GBR)	Team Sky	+ 38"
7	Niki Terpstra (NED)	Omega Pharma–Quick-Step	+ 45"
8	Philippe Gilbert (BEL)	BMC Racing Team	+ 48"
9	Jens Keukeleire (BEL)	Orica–GreenEDGE	+ 56"
10	Sebastian Langeveld (NED)	Garmin–Sharp	+ 1' 04"

=== Stage 7 ===
17 August 2014 — Riemst (Belgium) to Sittard-Geleen (Netherlands), 183.4 km (114.0 mi)

Niki Terpstra was disqualified for aggressive behaviour during this stage towards Maarten Wynants.

Stage 7 Result

	Rider	Team	Time
1	Guillaume Van Keirsbulck (BEL)	Omega Pharma–Quick-Step	4h 25' 47"
2	Matteo Trentin (ITA)	Omega Pharma–Quick-Step	+ 46"
3	Yves Lampaert (BEL)	Topsport Vlaanderen–Baloise	+ 46"
4	Julien Vermote (BEL)	Omega Pharma–Quick-Step	+ 46"
5	Kristijan Koren (SLO)	Cannondale	+ 46"
6	Laurens De Vreese (BEL)	Wanty–Groupe Gobert	+ 46"
7	Pablo Lastras (ESP)	Movistar Team	+ 46"
8	Danilo Hondo (GER)	Trek Factory Racing	+ 46"
9	Silvan Dillier (SUI)	BMC Racing Team	+ 46"
10	Dylan van Baarle (NED)	Garmin–Sharp	+ 46"

Final General Classification

	Rider	Team	Time
1	Tim Wellens (BEL)	Lotto–Belisol	25h 30' 15"
2	Lars Boom (NED)	Belkin Pro Cycling	+ 7"
3	Tom Dumoulin (NED)	Giant–Shimano	+ 13"
4	Andriy Hrivko (UKR)	Astana	+ 33"
5	Greg Van Avermaet (BEL)	BMC Racing Team	+ 34"
6	Geraint Thomas (GBR)	Team Sky	+ 38"
7	Philippe Gilbert (BEL)	BMC Racing Team	+ 48"
8	Jens Keukeleire (BEL)	Orica–GreenEDGE	+ 56"
9	Sebastian Langeveld (NED)	Garmin–Sharp	+ 1' 04"
10	Marco Marcato (ITA)	Cannondale	+ 1' 11"

== Classification leadership table ==
Stage	Winner	General classification	Points classification	Combativity Classification	Team classification
1	Andrea Guardini	Andrea Guardini	Andrea Guardini	Kenneth Vanbilsen	Team Katusha
2	Zdeněk Štybar	Zdeněk Štybar	Lars Boom	Kenneth Vanbilsen	Belkin Pro Cycling
3	Tom Dumoulin	Lars Boom	Lars Boom	Kenneth Vanbilsen	BMC Racing Team
4	Nacer Bouhanni	Lars Boom	Andrea Guardini	Kenneth Vanbilsen	BMC Racing Team
5	Greg Van Avermaet	Tom Dumoulin	Tom Dumoulin	Kenneth Vanbilsen	BMC Racing Team
6	Tim Wellens	Tim Wellens	Tom Dumoulin	Kenneth Vanbilsen	Belkin Pro Cycling
7	Guillaume Van Keirsbulck	Tim Wellens	Tom Dumoulin	Kenneth Vanbilsen	Garmin–Sharp
Final		Tim Wellens	Tom Dumoulin	Kenneth Vanbilsen	Garmin–Sharp

== UCI World Tour points ==
The 2014 Eneco Tour was part of the UCI World Tour and so the riders could earn UCI World Tour points. Below is states which riders won points and where. For each stage, points were given to the top five in each stage: 6, 4, 2, 1 and 1. At the end of the tour, the top 10 in the standings receive points as follows: 100, 80, 70, 60, 50, 40, 30, 20, 10 and 4. This resulted in the following points being earned during this tour:

	Cyclist	Team	Points
1	Tim Wellens (BEL)	Lotto–Belisol	106
2	Lars Boom (NED)	Belkin Pro Cycling	89
3	Tom Dumoulin (NED)	Giant–Shimano	81
4	Andriy Hrivko (UKR)	Astana	60
5	Greg Van Avermaet (BEL)	BMC Racing Team	58
6	Geraint Thomas (GBR)	Team Sky	43
7	Philippe Gilbert (BEL)	BMC Racing Team	30
8	Jens Keukeleire (BEL)	Orica–GreenEDGE	20
9	Sebastian Langeveld (NED)	Garmin–Sharp	10
10	Nacer Bouhanni (FRA)	FDJ.fr	6
10	Andrea Guardini (ITA)	Astana	6
10	Zdeněk Štybar (CZE)	Omega Pharma–Quick-Step	6
10	Guillaume Van Keirsbulck (BEL)	Omega Pharma–Quick-Step	6
14	Marco Marcato (ITA)	Cannondale	5
15	Fabian Cancellara (SUI)	Trek Factory Racing	4
15	Yohann Gène (FRA)	Astana	4
15	Luka Mezgec (SLO)	Giant–Shimano	4
15	Matteo Trentin (ITA)	Omega Pharma–Quick-Step	4
19	Pavel Brutt (RUS)	Team Katusha	2
19	Davide Cimolai (ITA)	Lampre–Merida	2
19	Jens Debusschere (BEL)	Lotto–Belisol	2
19	Giacomo Nizzolo (ITA)	Trek Factory Racing	2
19	Manuel Quinziato (ITA)	BMC Racing Team	2
19	Sep Vanmarcke (BEL)	Belkin Pro Cycling	2
25	Matti Breschel (DEN)	Tinkoff–Saxo	1
25	Kristijan Koren (SLO)	Cannondale	1
25	Jesse Sergent (NZL)	Trek Factory Racing	1
25	Boy van Poppel (NED)	Trek Factory Racing	1
25	Julien Vermote (BEL)	Omega Pharma–Quick-Step	1
