= 2023 Clásica Jaén Paraíso Interior =

2023 UCI Europe Tour

Race details
- Dates: 13 February 2023
- Distance: 178.9 km (111.2 mi)
- Winning time: 4h 36' 41"

Results
	Winner	Tadej Pogačar (SLO)	(UAE Team Emirates)
	Second	Ben Turner (GBR)	(Ineos Grenadiers)
	Third	Tim Wellens (BEL)	(UAE Team Emirates)

The 2023 Clásica Jaén Paraíso Interior was the second edition of the Clásica Jaén Paraíso Interior road cycling race. It was held on 13 February 2023 in the titular province of Spain as a category 1.1 event on the 2023 UCI Europe Tour calendar.

== Teams ==
Seven UCI WorldTeams, eight UCI ProTeams, and one UCI Continental team made up the sixteen teams that participated in the race.

UCI WorldTeams

- Arkéa–Samsic
- Astana Qazaqstan Team
- Cofidis
- Ineos Grenadiers
- Intermarché–Circus–Wanty
- Movistar Team
- UAE Team Emirates

UCI ProTeams

- Burgos BH
- Caja Rural–Seguros RGA
- Equipo Kern Pharma
- Euskaltel–Euskadi
- Israel–Premier Tech
- Lotto–Dstny
- Q36.5 Pro Cycling Team
- Team Flanders–Baloise

UCI Continental Teams

- Electro Hiper Europa

== Results ==
Result
Rank	Rider	Team	Time
1	Tadej Pogačar (SLO)	UAE Team Emirates	4h 36' 41"
2	Ben Turner (GBR)	Ineos Grenadiers	+ 49"
3	Tim Wellens (BEL)	UAE Team Emirates	+ 49"
4	Marc Hirschi (SUI)	UAE Team Emirates	+ 1' 17"
5	Andreas Kron (DEN)	Lotto–Dstny	+ 1' 17"
6	Ben Tulett (GBR)	Ineos Grenadiers	+ 1' 17"
7	Lorenzo Rota (ITA)	Intermarché–Circus–Wanty	+ 1' 17"
8	Georg Zimmermann (GER)	Intermarché–Circus–Wanty	+ 1' 31"
9	Warren Barguil (FRA)	Arkéa–Samsic	+ 1' 31"
10	Gorka Izagirre (ESP)	Movistar Team	+ 1' 31"
