= Tim Wellens =

Belgian road racing cyclist (born 1991)

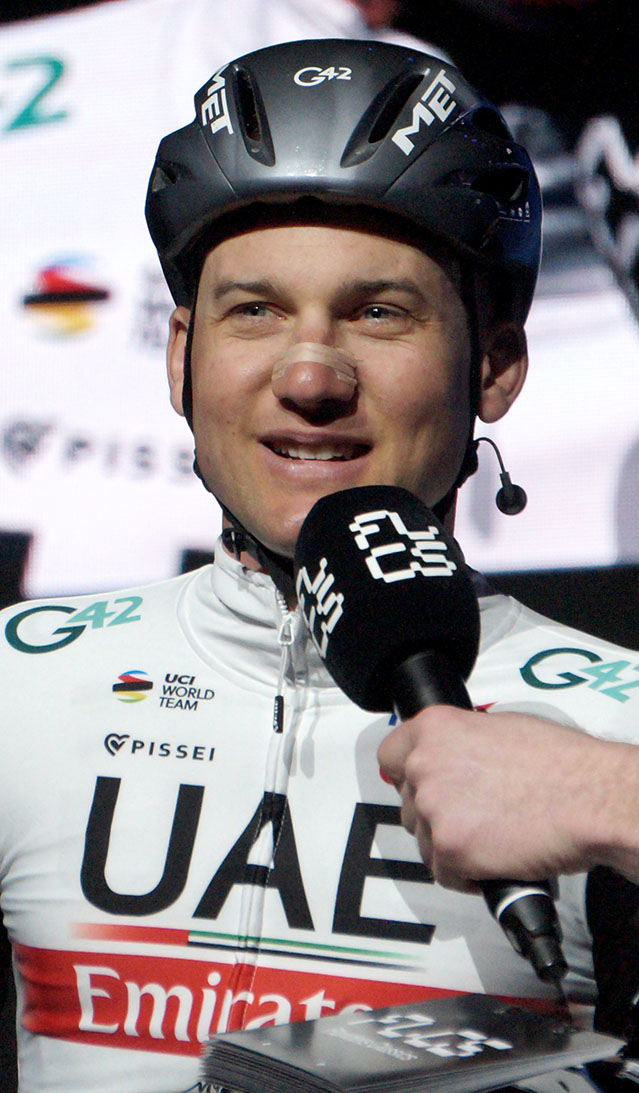
- Wellens at the 2023 Omloop Het Nieuwsblad

Personal information
- Full name: Tim Wellens
- Born: 10 May 1991 (age 35) Sint-Truiden, Flanders, Belgium
- Height: 1.82 m (6 ft 0 in)
- Weight: 71 kg (157 lb)

Cycling career
- Sport: Cycling
- Current team: UAE Team Emirates XRG
- Discipline: Road
- Role: Rider
- Rider type: Puncheur; Classics specialist

Amateur teams
- 2009: Avia Cycling Team
- 2010–2012: Davo–Lotto

Professional teams
- 2012–2022: Lotto–Belisol
- 2023–: UAE Team Emirates

Major wins
- Grand Tours Tour de France 1 individual stage (2025) Giro d'Italia 2 individual stages (2016, 2018) Vuelta a España 2 individual stages (2020) Stage races Benelux Tour (2014, 2015, 2023, 2024) Tour de Pologne (2016) Tour of Guangxi (2017) Tour de Wallonie (2018) Tour of Britain (2026) Vuelta a Andalucía (2018) One-day races and Classics National Road Race Championships (2025) National Time Trial Championships (2024) GP de Montréal (2015) Brabantse Pijl (2018)

Tim Wellens (born 10 May 1991) is a Belgian professional road cyclist, who rides for UCI WorldTeam UAE Team Emirates XRG.

Since turning professional in 2012, and coming from a family of professional cyclists, Wellens has taken almost forty professional victories including a record four overall victories (2014, 2015, 2023, 2024) – as well as four stage wins – in the Benelux Tour. Further to this, Wellens has taken UCI World Tour victories at the 2015 Grand Prix Cycliste de Montréal, the 2016 Tour de Pologne and the 2017 Tour of Guangxi. He has also won five Grand Tour stages – one each at the 2016 Giro d'Italia and the 2018 Giro d'Italia, two at the 2020 Vuelta a España, and one at the 2025 Tour de France – and the Belgian National Time Trial Championships in 2024.

== Career ==
Born in Sint-Truiden, Wellens rode as a junior for the Avia Cycling Team alongside the likes of Dylan Teuns and Gijs Van Hoecke, before riding for two-and-half seasons with the Davo–Lotto development team. He won the young rider classification at the 2012 Circuit des Ardennes, prior to turning professional in the middle of that season, joining the Lotto–Belisol team.

=== Lotto–Belisol (2012–2022) ===
==== 2012–2014 ====
Wellens made his début with the Lotto–Belisol team at the 2012 GP José Dubois, where he finished eighth; he later made his first appearances on the UCI World Tour, by competing in the Canadian pair of races in Quebec and Montreal, attempting to bridge to each race's breakaway during the respective events. Wellens performed strongly in the season-ending Tour of Beijing, finishing each of the race's stages inside the top 25 placings – taking a best of fifth on the final stage – en route to a final overall finish of tenth, and second to Saxo Bank–Tinkoff Bank rider Rafał Majka in the young rider classification.

In his first full season with the team in 2013, Wellens recorded his best overall finish at the Tour de Wallonie, where he finished in eighth place. He also finished second in both the mountains and young rider classifications, losing out on the latter on countback to compatriot Olivier Chevalier.

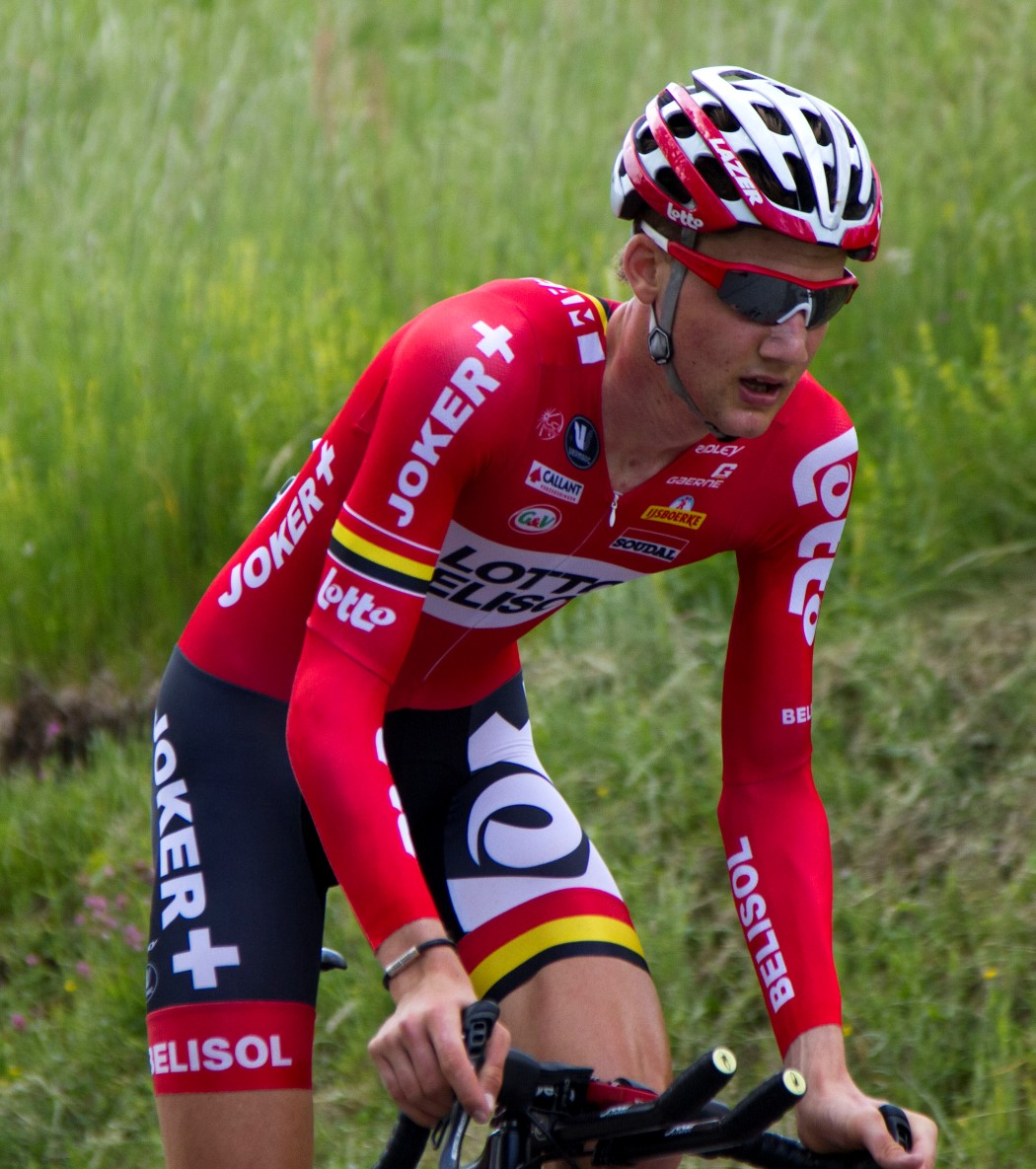
Wellens at the 2014 Giro d'Italia

In May 2014, and having finished second to Kristof Vandewalle in the Belgian National Time Trial Championships, Wellens made his Grand Tour début at the Giro d'Italia. During the race, he recorded two second-place stage finishes – on stage six behind overall leader Michael Matthews at Monte Cassino, and stage seventeen behind Stefano Pirazzi in Vittorio Veneto. After another second-place finish in the general classification, to Philippe Gilbert, at June's Ster ZLM Toer, Wellens took his first professional victories at the Eneco Tour in August. On the sixth stage, Wellens attacked with around 10 kilometres (6.2 miles) remaining and ultimately soloed to the win in Aywaille, almost a minute clear of his nearest rival. Having assumed the race leader's white jersey, Wellens maintained his seven-second race lead through the final stage for the overall victory. Before the end of the season, Wellens recorded further high placings at the GP Ouest-France (sixth) and the Giro di Lombardia (fourth).

==== 2015 ====
Wellens started the season with finishes of tenth in the Trofeo Andratx–Mirador d'Es Colomer and second in the Trofeo Serra de Tramuntana one-day races held as part of the Vuelta a Mallorca, and also finished tenth overall at Paris–Nice. Wellens made his first start at the Tour de France, but he later described his race performance as "really bad". During stage six of August's Eneco Tour, Wellens attacked on the Côte Saint-Roch, then won nine seconds in the sprints in the golden kilometre. The main group was not able to chase Wellens down and his lead extended during the downhill run into Houffalize; he won the stage by 49 seconds ahead of Greg Van Avermaet, with Simon Geschke third. Wellens moved into the overall lead, 1' 03" ahead of Van Avermaet, with Wilco Kelderman dropping to third. Wellens defended his lead on the final stage to win his second successive Eneco Tour. The following month, Wellens won his first one-day race as a professional, winning the Grand Prix Cycliste de Montréal in a sprint against Adam Yates, after the duo broke clear of the field in the closing stages.

==== 2016 ====
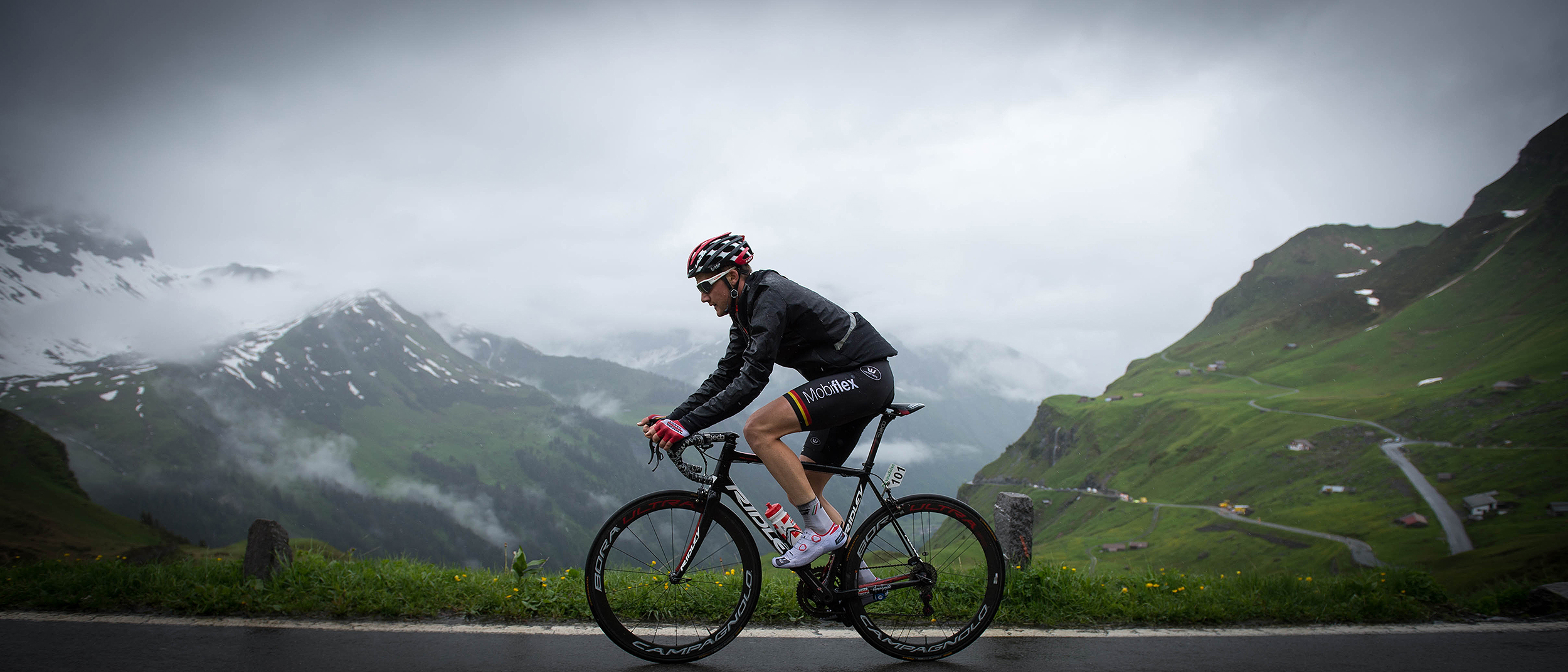
Wellens at the 2016 Tour de Suisse

Wellens won the final stage of Paris–Nice; having been a part of the day's breakaway, Wellens was its last survivor and remained clear until the final climb of Col d'Èze, where he was caught by Richie Porte and Alberto Contador. The trio worked together on the descent, as Porte and Contador were chasing the general classification victory, but Wellens ultimately won the sprint on the Promenade des Anglais. Having placed in the top ten at the Amstel Gold Race, Wellens won the sixth stage of the Giro d'Italia, attacking from the breakaway, that he had earlier bridged across to, with around 15 kilometres (9.3 miles) remaining before the finish in Roccaraso – for his first Grand Tour stage win.

A second-place finish to Philippe Gilbert at the Belgian National Road Race Championships followed, before he took another solo victory, winning the fifth stage of the 2016 Tour de Pologne into Zakopane after a 35-kilometre (22-mile) solo move in driving rain. Wellens ultimately won the stage by almost 4 minutes, while further back, a total of 85 riders abandoned the race. With the penultimate stage cancelled due to bad weather, Wellens ultimately won the race by more than four minutes, also winning the sprints and mountains classifications. He was later selected to ride for Belgium in the road race and the time trial at the Rio Olympics.

==== 2017 ====
Wellens took three early-season victories in Spain, as he won the Trofeo Serra de Tramuntana and Trofeo Andratx–Mirador d'Es Colomer one-day races – part of the Vuelta a Mallorca – on consecutive days in January, before winning the final stage of the Vuelta a Andalucía from a small lead group the following month. At Strade Bianche, Wellens was one of four riders that went clear of the field with around 25 kilometres (16 miles) remaining, but was ultimately beaten to the finish in Siena by Michał Kwiatkowski and Greg Van Avermaet. Wellens abandoned the Tour de France during stage 15, because of heat and pollen allergies which he refused to treat with a therapeutic use exemption (TUE), which he does not approve to use. Despite having asthma, Wellens does not use an inhaler and likened such usage to "cheating".

Wellens won the penultimate stage of the BinckBank Tour into Houffalize, getting the better of Tom Dumoulin in a sprint à deux. He was unable to overturn his four-second pre-stage deficit to Dumoulin on the final stage, with Dumoulin ultimately prevailing by seventeen seconds in the general classification. After a fifth-place finish at the Grand Prix Cycliste de Québec, Wellens won the Grand Prix de Wallonie after a 16-kilometre (9.9-mile) solo move from a lead group of around twenty riders that had formed in the windy conditions. He completed the season with seven victories in total, as he added a stage win and the general classification victory at the inaugural Tour of Guangxi.

==== 2018 ====
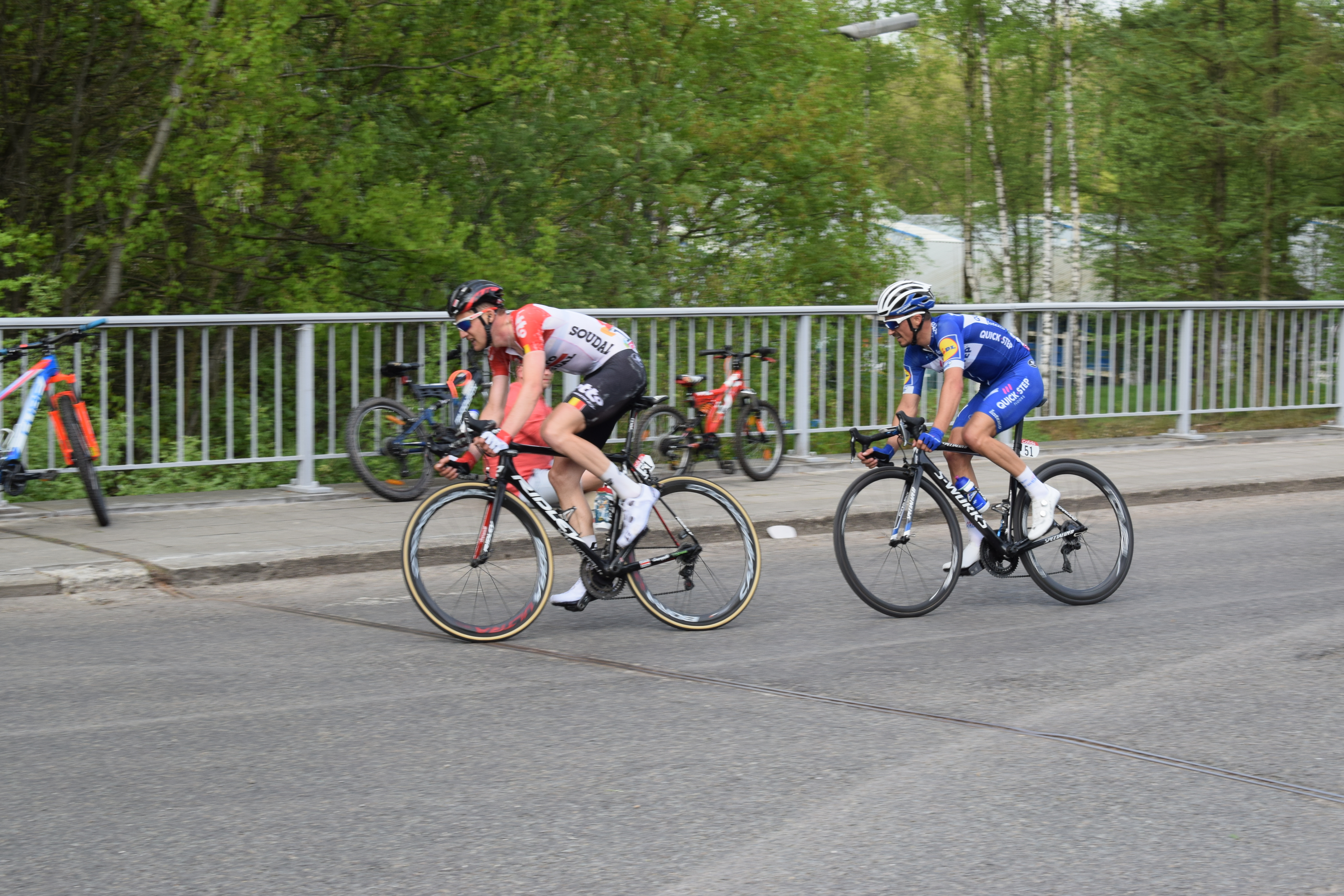
Wellens (left) leading Julian Alaphilippe at the 2018 Liège–Bastogne–Liège

His first victory of the 2018 season came at the Trofeo Serra de Tramuntana, winning the race for the second year in a row. At the Vuelta a Andalucía, Wellens won stage 4 and took the lead of the overall standings, by beating Mikel Landa on the cobbled climb of Alcalá de los Gazules. He held the lead through the final individual time trial in Barbate, taking the overall victory by eight seconds from Wout Poels. He then finished fifth overall at Paris–Nice, winning the points classification as a result of five top-ten stage finishes across the eight-stage race. At Brabantse Pijl, Wellens attacked with around 8 kilometres (5.0 miles) remaining before the finish in Overijse, ultimately soloing to victory by nine seconds over a group of six riders. He concluded the spring classics portion of the season with top-ten finishes at the Amstel Gold Race (sixth) and La Flèche Wallonne (seventh).

Wellens won the fourth stage of the Giro d'Italia, winning on an uphill finish in Caltagirone on Sicily, for his second career stage victory at the race. He ultimately had to withdraw from the race prior to the final rest day due to illness. Later in the season, Wellens won the second stage of the Tour de Wallonie into Namur, taking the overall lead in the process. Having lost the lead to Quinten Hermans by three seconds prior to the final stage, Wellens was able to gain the time back at intermediate sprints, and took the race victory on countback from Hermans. He then recorded third-place finishes at the BinckBank Tour and the Bretagne Classic Ouest-France, and also finished in fifth place at Il Lombardia – after which he cycled a 1,000-kilometre (620-mile) journey back to Belgium with teammate Thomas De Gendt, following his seven-win season.

==== 2019 ====
Wellens started the 2019 season with a block of racing in Spain, starting at the Vuelta a Mallorca one-day races – where he finished fifth in the Trofeo Ses Salines, second in the Trofeo Andratx–Lloseta, before taking a third consecutive victory in the Trofeo Serra de Tramuntana. He then took two stage victories at the Vuelta a Andalucía, including winning on the cobbled climb of Alcalá de los Gazules for the second year in succession. After this, he recorded third-place finishes at Omloop Het Nieuwsblad in March, Brabantse Pijl in April, and June's Tour of Belgium, where he also won the individual time trial on stage three.

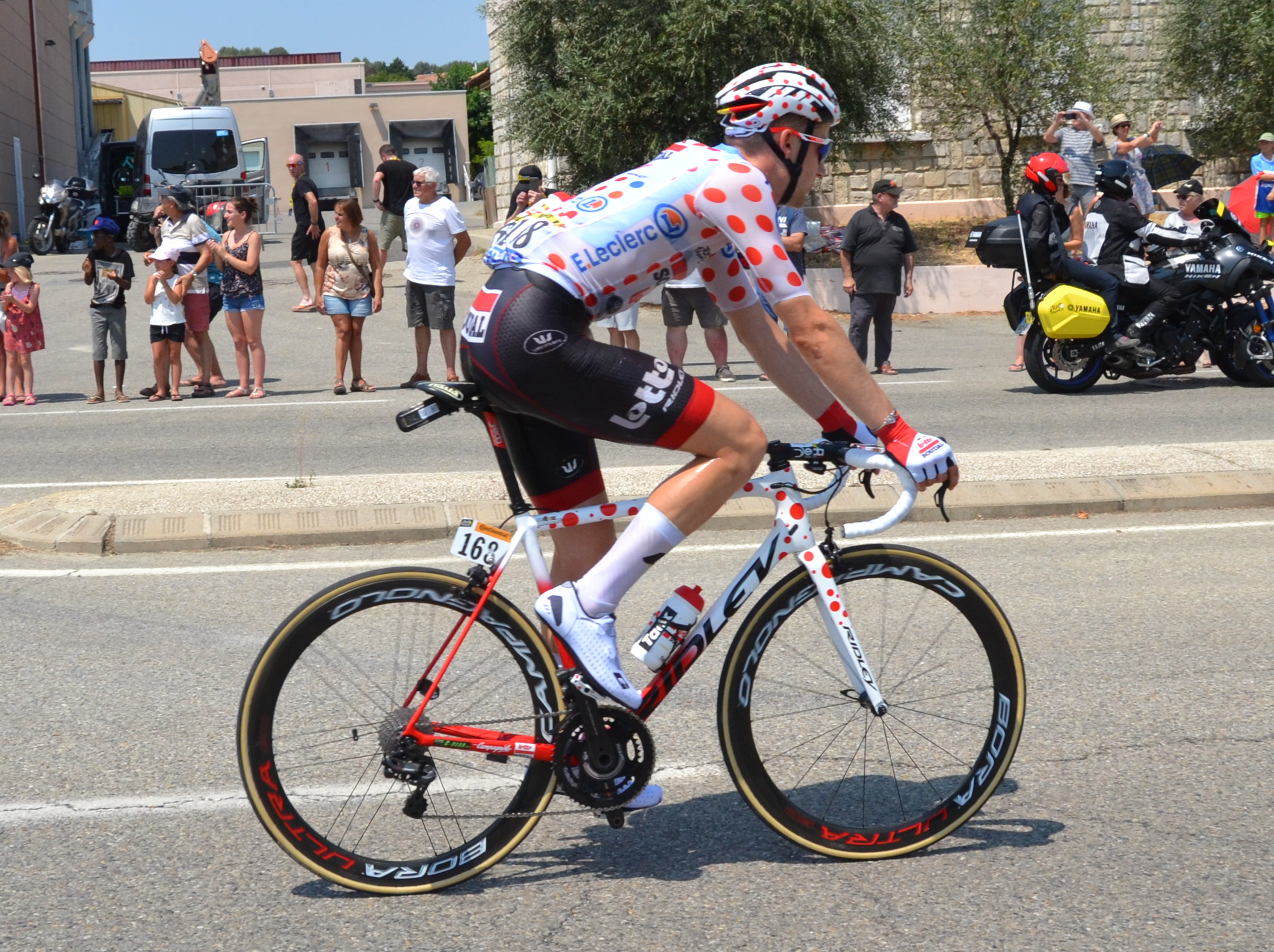
Wellens at the 2019 Tour de France, where he held the mountains classification lead for 15 stages

At the Tour de France, Wellens took the lead in the mountains classification following the third stage, having attacked from a five-rider lead group with around 45 kilometres (28 miles) remaining. He held the mountains classification lead until stage 17 – having featured in multiple further breakaways – ceding the jersey to Romain Bardet, who would go on to win the jersey. Following the Tour de France, Wellens finished third overall at the BinckBank Tour; having won the fourth stage to take the race lead, Wellens lost more than 40 seconds on the final stage into Geraardsbergen, and dropped behind Laurens De Plus and Oliver Naesen in the general classification. Wellens recorded four more top-ten finishes before the end of the season, but no podium results.

==== 2020–2022 ====
Wellens started 2020 with a fifth-place finish at the Volta ao Algarve, prior to the COVID-19 pandemic-enforced suspension of racing. Following a fifth-place finish at the Tour de Luxembourg, Wellens rode the Vuelta a España for the first time in his career. He won two stages during the race, and finished second to Guillaume Martin in the mountains classification.

With the Vuelta a Mallorca races postponed to late-spring due to the COVID-19 pandemic in Spain, Wellens started his 2021 season racing in France, making several attacks in a sixth-place finish at the Grand Prix La Marseillaise. In his next start, at the Étoile de Bessèges, Wellens won the third stage with a 16-kilometre (9.9-mile) solo attack to take the race lead, and ultimately held on to the general classification lead for the remainder of the race. Over the remainder of the season, Wellens took three top-ten overall finishes in UCI World Tour stage races: seventh at Tirreno–Adriatico, sixth at the Tour de Pologne, and fourth at the renamed Benelux Tour.

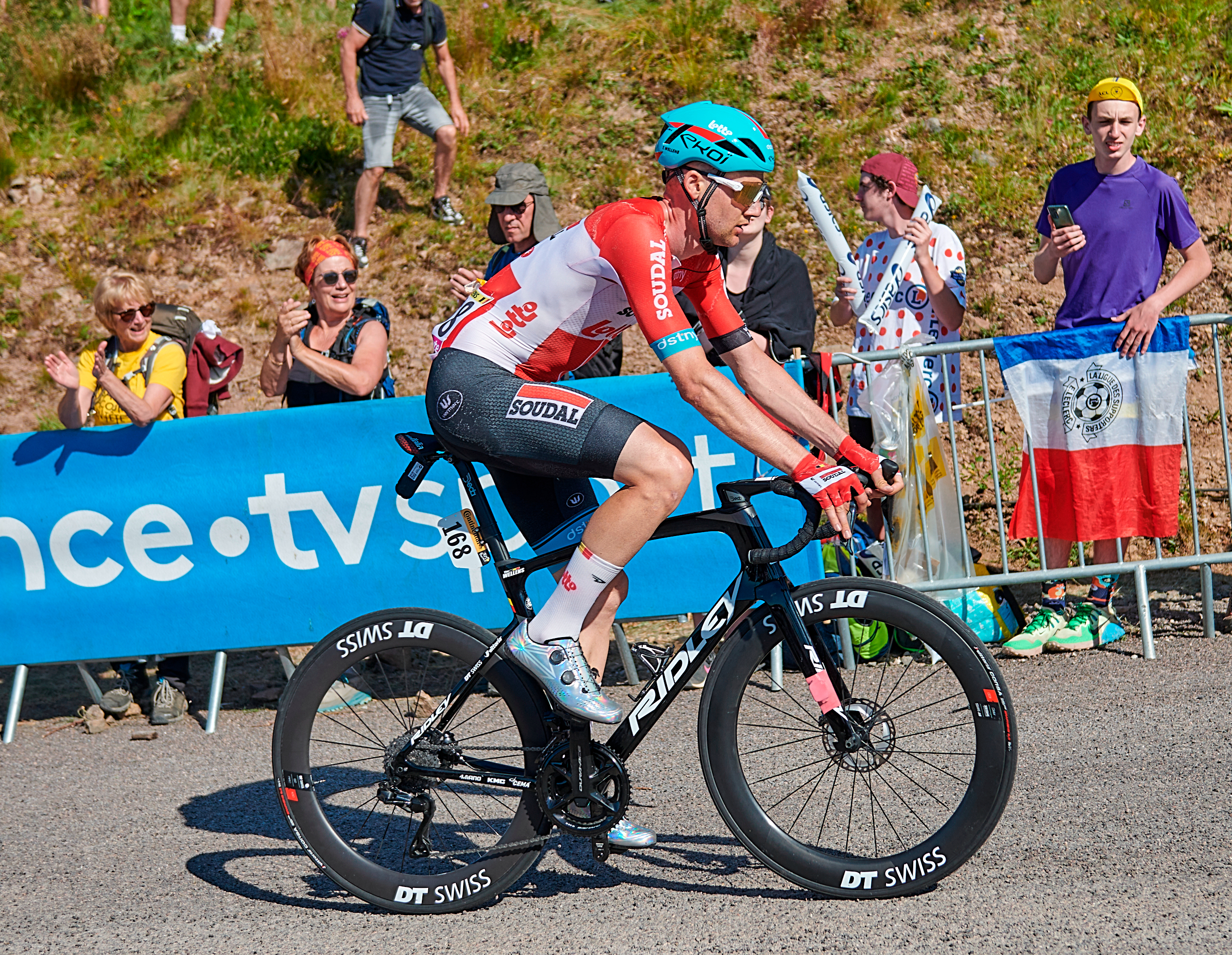
Wellens at the 2022 Tour de France

Wellens took his fourth victory at the Trofeo Serra de Tramuntana in January 2022, winning a small group sprint. Having finished in the top ten placings in two of the other Vuelta a Mallorca races, Wellens also took a second-place finish at the Clásica Jaén Paraíso Interior, behind Alexey Lutsenko. He then won the second stage of the Tour des Alpes-Maritimes et du Var, beating Nairo Quintana to the line in La Turbie to take the leader's jersey. Quintana would go on to win the race on the final day, while Wellens finished 90 seconds behind – but this was still good enough to finish in second overall. Before the end of the spring, Wellens had also recorded top-ten finishes at Strade Bianche (eighth), and Brabantse Pijl (ninth), having been relegated from the podium of the latter due to an irregular sprint. His best result for the remainder of the season was a second-place overall finish at the Tour of Belgium, finishing in the same time as race winner Mauro Schmid – having been denied bonus seconds at intermediate sprint points by Schmid's Quick-Step Alpha Vinyl Team teammate Yves Lampaert impeding him, a move for which Lampaert was disqualified for.

=== UAE Team Emirates (2023–present) ===
After a decade with Lotto–Soudal, Wellens joined UAE Team Emirates on a two-year contract from the 2023 season. Wellens started his season with a block of racing in Spain, recording his first podium finish with the team: a third-place result at the Clásica Jaén Paraíso Interior in February. The following week, he took his first win, taking the third stage of the Vuelta a Andalucía – which finished at Alcalá de los Gazules, on a cobbled climb where Wellens had previously won in 2018 and 2019. He was part of the lead group at Kuurne–Brussels–Kuurne, finishing in fifth position, before his season was impacted by injuries suffered in a mass crash at the Tour of Flanders, breaking his collarbone in four places. Having missed the Tour de France as a result, Wellens took one further victory during the season – the general classification at the Renewi Tour, winning the race for a record third time.

In the early part of 2024, Wellens recorded six top-five finishes without any victories, his best result being a runner-up finish to Wout van Aert at February's Kuurne–Brussels–Kuurne from a three-rider sprint. Following a third-place finish at Brabantse Pijl in April, Wellens signed a one-year contract extension with UAE Team Emirates, until the end of the 2025 season. In June, Wellens won his first national title at elite level, when he won the Belgian National Time Trial Championships in Binche, finishing nine seconds ahead of Alec Segaert. He rode in support of Tadej Pogačar at the Tour de France, but found individual success in some of the UCI World Tour races that followed the Tour de France. He won the second stage, an individual time trial, at the Tour de Pologne, before taking a fourth overall victory at the Renewi Tour, taking the leader's jersey from Segaert on the final day.

== Personal life ==
Wellens is married with a son, born in 2022. His father Leo Wellens and uncles Paul Wellens and Johan Wellens all competed professionally in cycling during the 1970s and the 1980s.

== Major results ==
2008
1st Cross-country, National Junior Mountain Bike Championships
4th Overall Liège–La Gleize
2009
2nd Overall Tour d'Istrie

1st Stage 1

3rd Overall Tre Giorni Orobica
5th Road race, National Junior Road Championships
5th Overall Liège–La Gleize

1st Stage 4

2010
7th Overall Tour des Pays de Savoie
2011
5th Time trial, National Under-23 Road Championships
5th Overall Tour des Pays de Savoie
2012
2nd Overall Toscana-Terra di Ciclismo
2nd Overall Vuelta a Navarra
4th Circuit de Wallonie
8th Overall Circuit des Ardennes

1st Young rider classification

10th Overall Tour de l'Avenir
10th Overall Tour of Beijing
2013
8th Overall Tour de Wallonie
2014 (2 pro wins)
1st Overall Eneco Tour

1st Stage 6

2nd Time trial, National Road Championships
2nd Overall Ster ZLM Toer
4th Giro di Lombardia
6th GP Ouest-France
2015 (3)
1st Overall Eneco Tour

1st Stage 6

1st Grand Prix Cycliste de Montréal
2nd Trofeo Serra de Tramuntana
10th Overall Paris–Nice
10th Trofeo Andratx–Mirador d'Es Colomer
2016 (4)
1st Overall Tour de Pologne

1st Mountains classification
1st Sprints classification
1st Stage 5

Giro d'Italia

1st Stage 6
Held after Stages 7–9

1st Stage 7 Paris–Nice
2nd Road race, National Road Championships
10th Trofeo Serra de Tramuntana
10th Amstel Gold Race
2017 (7)
1st Overall Tour of Guangxi

1st Stage 4

1st Grand Prix de Wallonie
1st Trofeo Serra de Tramuntana
1st Trofeo Andratx–Mirador d'Es Colomer
1st Stage 5 Vuelta a Andalucía
2nd Overall BinckBank Tour

1st Stage 6

3rd Strade Bianche
4th Brabantse Pijl
5th Grand Prix Cycliste de Québec
9th Grote Prijs Jef Scherens
2018 (7)
1st Overall Tour de Wallonie

1st Stage 2

1st Overall Vuelta a Andalucía

1st Stage 4

1st Brabantse Pijl
1st Trofeo Serra de Tramuntana
1st Stage 4 Giro d'Italia
3rd Overall BinckBank Tour
3rd Bretagne Classic
5th Overall Paris–Nice

1st Points classification

5th Giro di Lombardia
6th Amstel Gold Race
7th La Flèche Wallonne
7th Trofeo Lloseta–Andratx
2019 (5)
1st Trofeo Serra de Tramuntana
2nd Trofeo Andratx–Lloseta
3rd Overall BinckBank Tour

1st Stage 4

3rd Overall Tour of Belgium

1st Stage 3 (ITT)

3rd Omloop Het Nieuwsblad
3rd Brabantse Pijl
4th Grand Prix Cycliste de Montréal
5th Trofeo Campos, Porreres, Felanitx, Ses Salines
8th Bretagne Classic
9th Overall Vuelta a Andalucía

1st Points classification
1st Stages 1 & 3 (ITT)

9th Grand Prix Cycliste de Québec
10th Strade Bianche
10th Tre Valli Varesine
Tour de France

Held after Stages 3–17
Combativity award Stages 3 & 6

2020 (2)
Vuelta a España

1st Stages 5 & 14
Held after Stages 5–6

4th Overall Tour de Luxembourg
5th Overall Volta ao Algarve
2021 (2)
1st Overall Étoile de Bessèges

1st Stage 3

4th Overall Benelux Tour
6th Overall Tour de Pologne
6th Grand Prix La Marseillaise
7th Overall Tirreno–Adriatico
2022 (2)
1st Trofeo Serra de Tramuntana
2nd Overall Tour des Alpes-Maritimes et du Var

1st Stage 2

2nd Overall Tour of Belgium
2nd Clásica Jaén Paraíso Interior
4th Trofeo Calvià
8th Strade Bianche
8th Trofeo Pollença–Port d'Andratx
9th Brabantse Pijl
9th Japan Cup
2023 (2)
1st Overall Renewi Tour
1st Stage 3 Vuelta a Andalucía
3rd Clásica Jaén Paraíso Interior
5th Overall Tour of Guangxi
5th Kuurne–Brussels–Kuurne
6th Vuelta a Murcia
2024 (3)
1st Time trial, National Road Championships
1st Overall Renewi Tour
1st Stage 2 (ITT) Tour de Pologne
2nd Kuurne–Brussels–Kuurne
3rd Brabantse Pijl
3rd Vuelta a Murcia
4th E3 Saxo Classic
4th Clásica Jaén Paraíso Interior
6th Grand Prix de Wallonie
7th Overall Tour of Guangxi
2025 (2)
1st Road race, National Road Championships
Tour de France

1st Stage 15
Held after Stages 3 & 6–9

UCI Gravel World Series

1st Valkenburg

3rd Overall Renewi Tour
3rd Strade Bianche
5th Overall Vuelta a Andalucía
8th E3 Saxo Classic
8th Vuelta a Murcia
9th Veneto Classic
10th Clásica Jaén Paraíso Interior
2026 (2)
1st Overall Tour of Britain
1st Clásica Jaén Paraíso Interior
2nd Time trial, National Road Championships
9th Overall Vuelta a Andalucía

=== Grand Tour general classification results timeline ===
Grand Tour	2014	2015	2016	2017	2018	2019	2020	2021	2022	2023	2024	2025
Giro d'Italia	54	—	96	—	DNF	—	—	—	—	—	—	—
Tour de France	—	129	—	DNF	—	94	—	—	DNF	—	80	37
Vuelta a España	—	—	—	—	—	—	78	—	—	—	—	—

=== Classics results timeline ===
Monument	2012	2013	2014	2015	2016	2017	2018	2019	2020	2021	2022	2023	2024	2025
Milan–San Remo	—	—	—	15	—	18	—	—	—	78	—	67	56	106
Tour of Flanders	—	—	—	—	—	—	—	34	DNF	25	43	DNF	12	DNF
Paris–Roubaix	—	—	—	—	—	—	—	—	—	—	—	—	15	DNF
Liège–Bastogne–Liège	—	DNF	43	93	48	35	16	11	33	24	86	—	—	—
Giro di Lombardia	50	—	4	71	DNF	20	5	29	OTL	82	58	—	—	—
Classic	2012	2013	2014	2015	2016	2017	2018	2019	2020	2021	2022	2023	2024	2025
Omloop Het Nieuwsblad	—	—	—	—	—	—	69	3	28	24	DNS	26	12	46
Kuurne–Brussels–Kuurne	—	NH	—	—	—	—	—	—	—	75	—	5	2	71
Strade Bianche	—	—	—	—	—	3	—	10	—	13	8	13	13	3
E3 Saxo Bank Classic	—	—	—	—	—	—	—	—	NH	—	—	DNF	4	8
Brabantse Pijl	—	19	—	—	38	4	1	3	49	—	9	—	3	—
Amstel Gold Race	—	—	68	19	10	42	6	DNF	NH	29	20	—	—	DNF
La Flèche Wallonne	—	139	61	31	65	18	7	17	21	36	23	—	—	—
Clásica de San Sebastián	—	102	44	31	13	DNF	DNF	DNF	NH	—	—	—	—	—
Bretagne Classic	—	115	6	110	96	83	3	8	—	—	—	—	—	DNF
Grand Prix Cycliste de Québec	DNF	51	108	120	14	5	28	9	Not held		—	35	88	80
Grand Prix Cycliste de Montréal	34	20	24	1	43	12	21	4	Not held		—	DNF	DNF	DNF

Legend
—	Did not compete
DNF	Did not finish
DNS	Did not start
OTL	Outside time limit
NH	Not held
