= Clásica Jaén Paraíso Interior =

Spanish one-day road cycling race

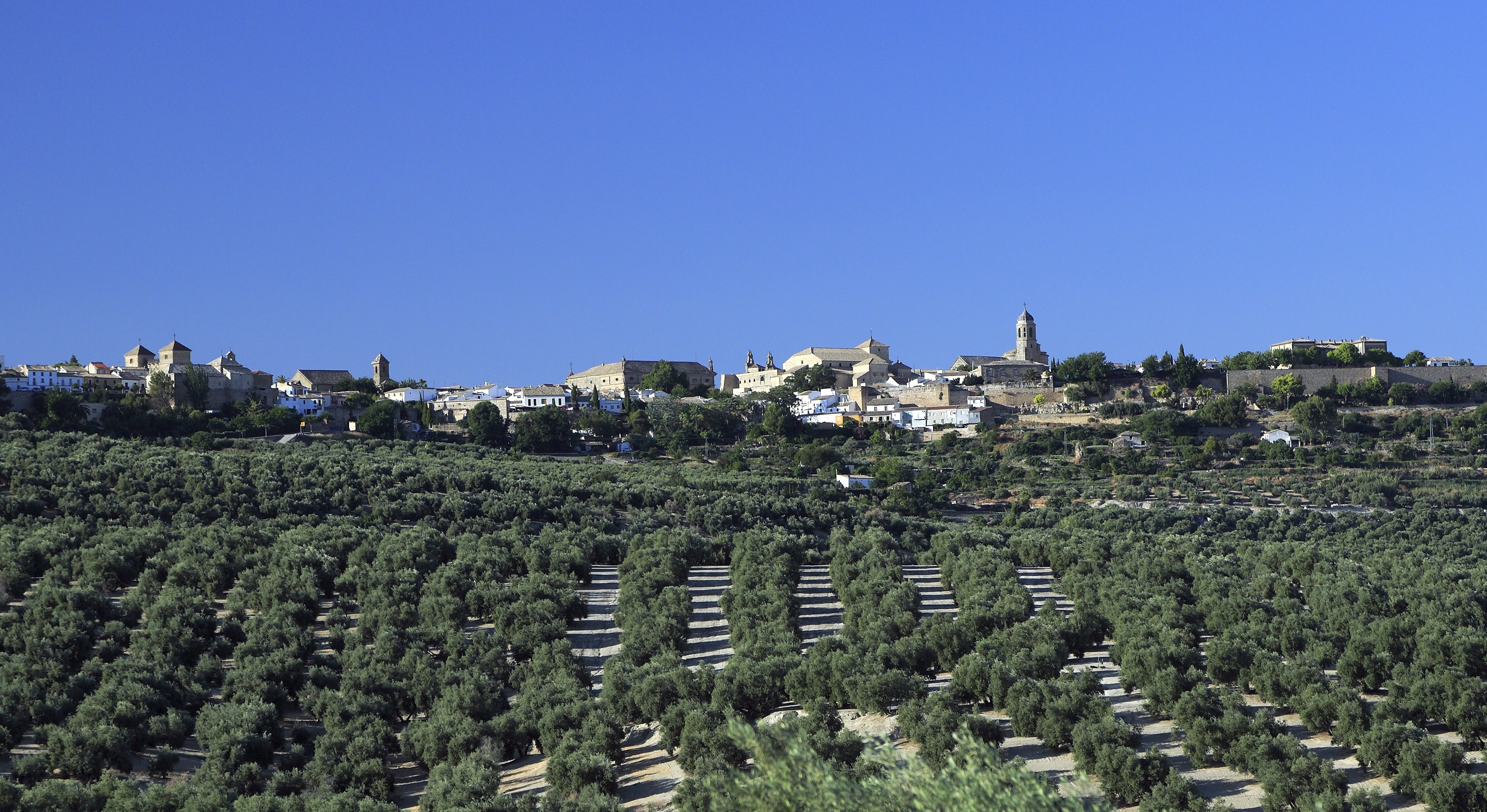
- A view of Úbeda and the surrounding fields of olive groves, where the gravel roads play an important role in the development of the race.

Race details
- Date: Mid-February
- Region: Jaén, Spain
- English name: Jaén Classic
- Local name: Clásica Jaén Paraíso Interior
- Discipline: Road race
- Competition: UCI Europe Tour
- Type: Single day race
- Organiser: Unidad Editorial and Úbeda municipality
- Race director: Pascual Momparler
- Web site: clasicajaen.com

History
- First edition: 2022
- Editions: 5 (as of 2026)
- First winner: Alexey Lutsenko (KAZ)
- Most wins: No repeat winners
- Most recent: Tim Wellens (BEL)

The Clásica Jaén Paraíso Interior is an elite men's professional road bicycle racing event held in the Province of Jaén, Spain.

Its first edition was held in 2022, being part of the UCI Europe Tour, with a 1.1 classification. The race in this edition started from the city of Baeza and had the finish line in the city center of Úbeda. The organisers designed a race with several gravel sectors through olive groves, and a steep finish between the Renaissance palaces of Úbeda, having a direct inspiration in the gravel and Siena finish of the Italian race Strade Bianche.

In the next years, the route introduced small changes, moving the start to Úbeda, and having a final circuit of 2 laps around 5 gravel sectors, with the finish line in the city center of Úbeda.

== Winners ==
Year	Country	Rider	Team
2022	Kazakhstan	Alexey Lutsenko	Astana Qazaqstan Team
2023	Slovenia	Tadej Pogačar	UAE Team Emirates
2024	Spain	Oier Lazkano	Movistar Team
2025	Poland	Michał Kwiatkowski	Ineos Grenadiers
2026	Belgium	Tim Wellens	UAE Team Emirates XRG
