= Riemst =

Municipality in province of Limburg, Belgium

- Municipality
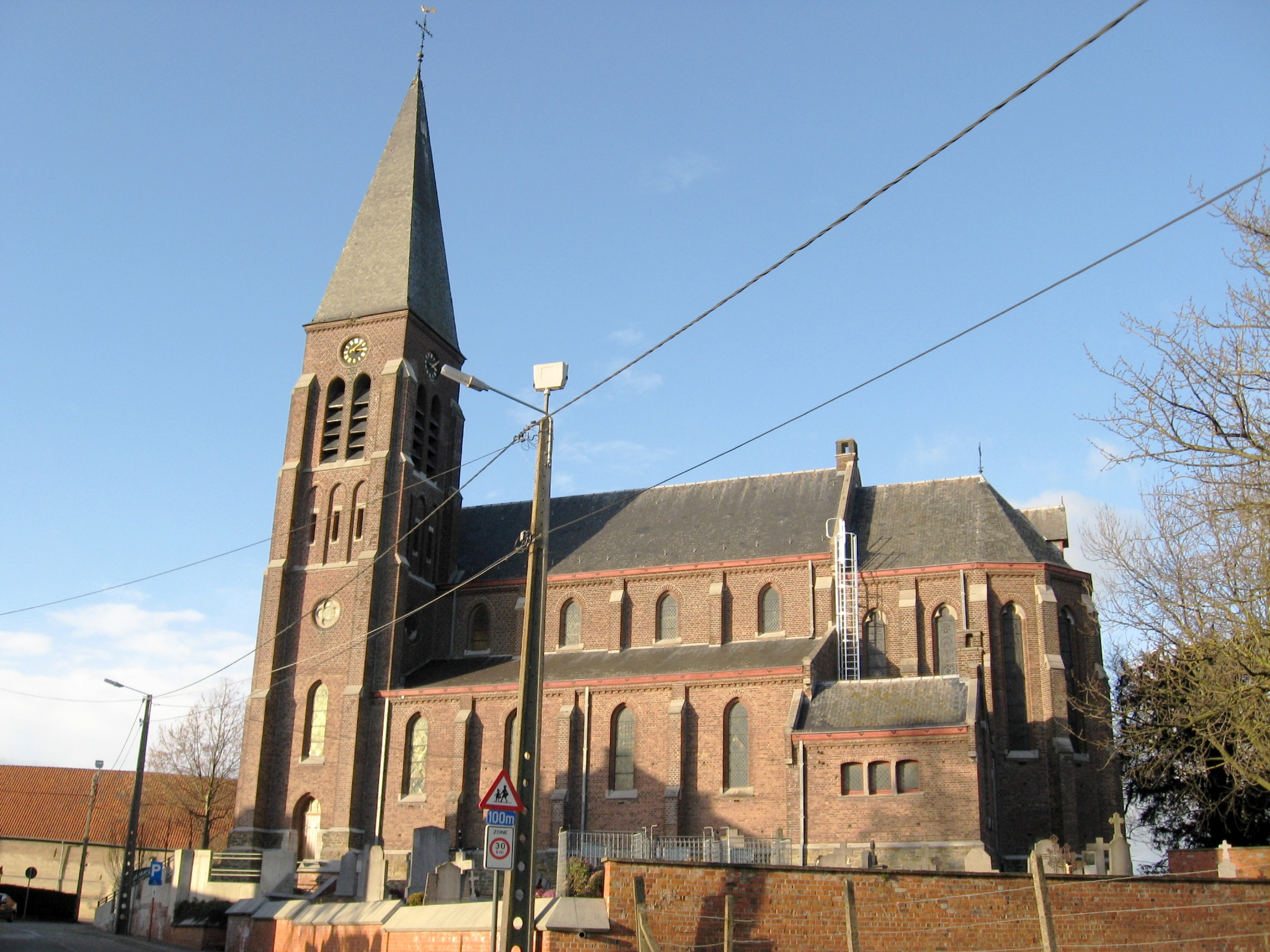

- Flag Coat of arms

- Location of Riemst in Limburg
- Interactive map of Riemst
- Location in Belgium
- Coordinates: 50°48′N 05°36′E
- Country: Belgium
- Community: Flemish Community
- Region: Flemish Region
- Province: Limburg
- Arrondissement: Tongeren

Government
  - Mayor: Mark Vos (CD&V)
  - Governing party: CD&V

Area
  - Total: 58.06 km^{2} (22.42 sq mi)

Population (2018-01-01)
  - Total: 16,665
  - Density: 287.0/km^{2} (743.4/sq mi)
- Postal codes: 3770
- NIS code: 73066
- Area codes: 012
- Website: www.riemst.be

Riemst (Dutch pronunciation: [rimst]; Limburgish: Riems) is a small town and a municipality in the Belgian province of Limburg. Riemst is in the Flemish-speaking area of Belgium.

On January 1, 2018 Riemst had a total population of 16,665. The total area is 57.88 km^{2} which gives a population density of 276 inhabitants per km^{2}.

Riemst was the site of the Battle of Lauffeld, fought in 1747.

The bridge in the Borough Vroenhoven was part of the start of World War II, when the Germans launched a coordinated attack on the area.

Paul Schiepers (born in 1919) was the last mayor of the borough of Riemst before it joined with the other boroughs to form the current town of Riemst. He died on August 18, 1978.

== Boroughs ==
Genoelselderen, Herderen, Kanne, Membruggen, Millen, Riemst, Val-Meer, Lafelt, Vlijtingen, Vroenhoven, Heukelom and Zichen-Zussen-Bolder

== Gallery ==
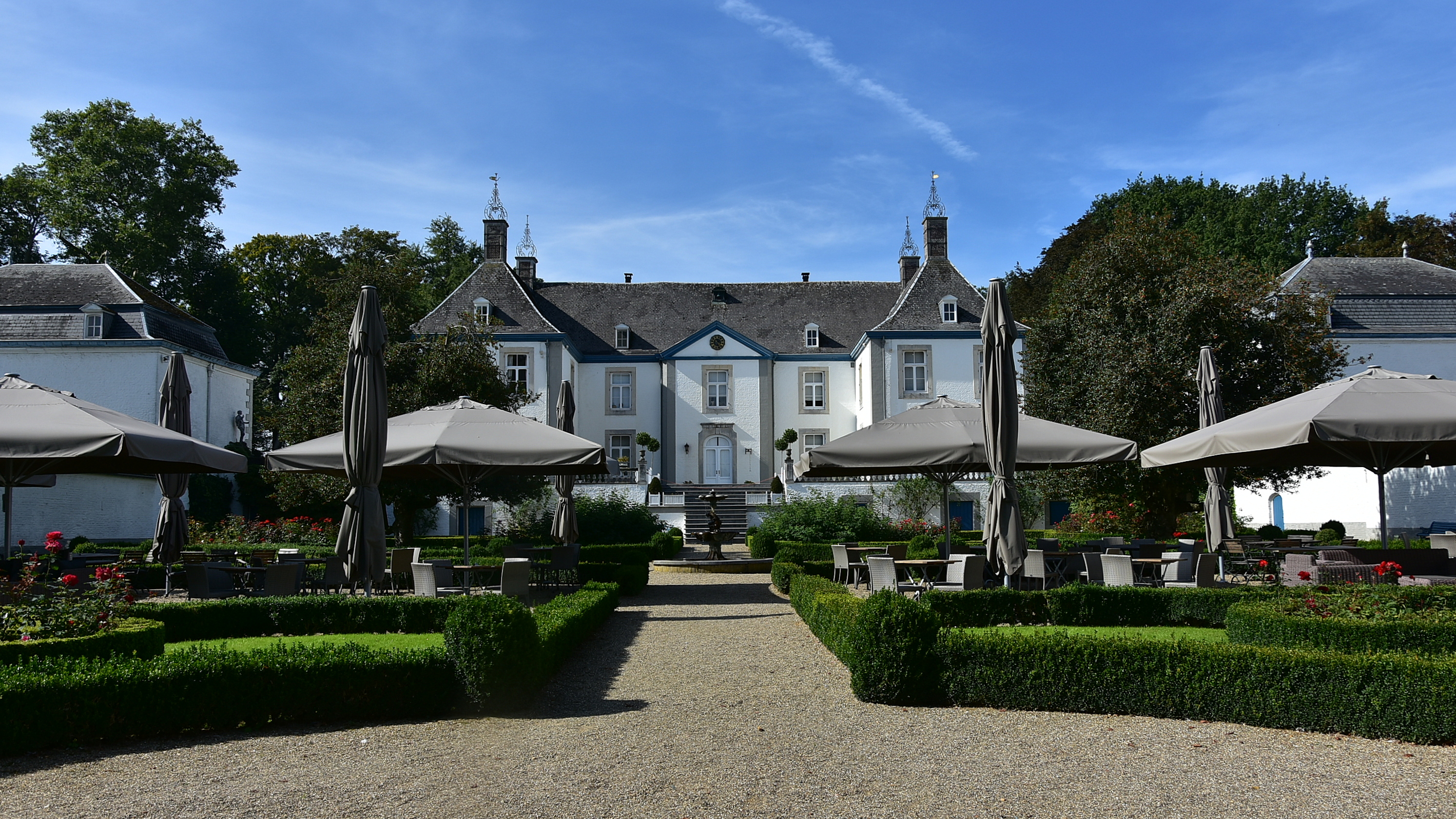
Elderen (wine) castle at Genoelselderen

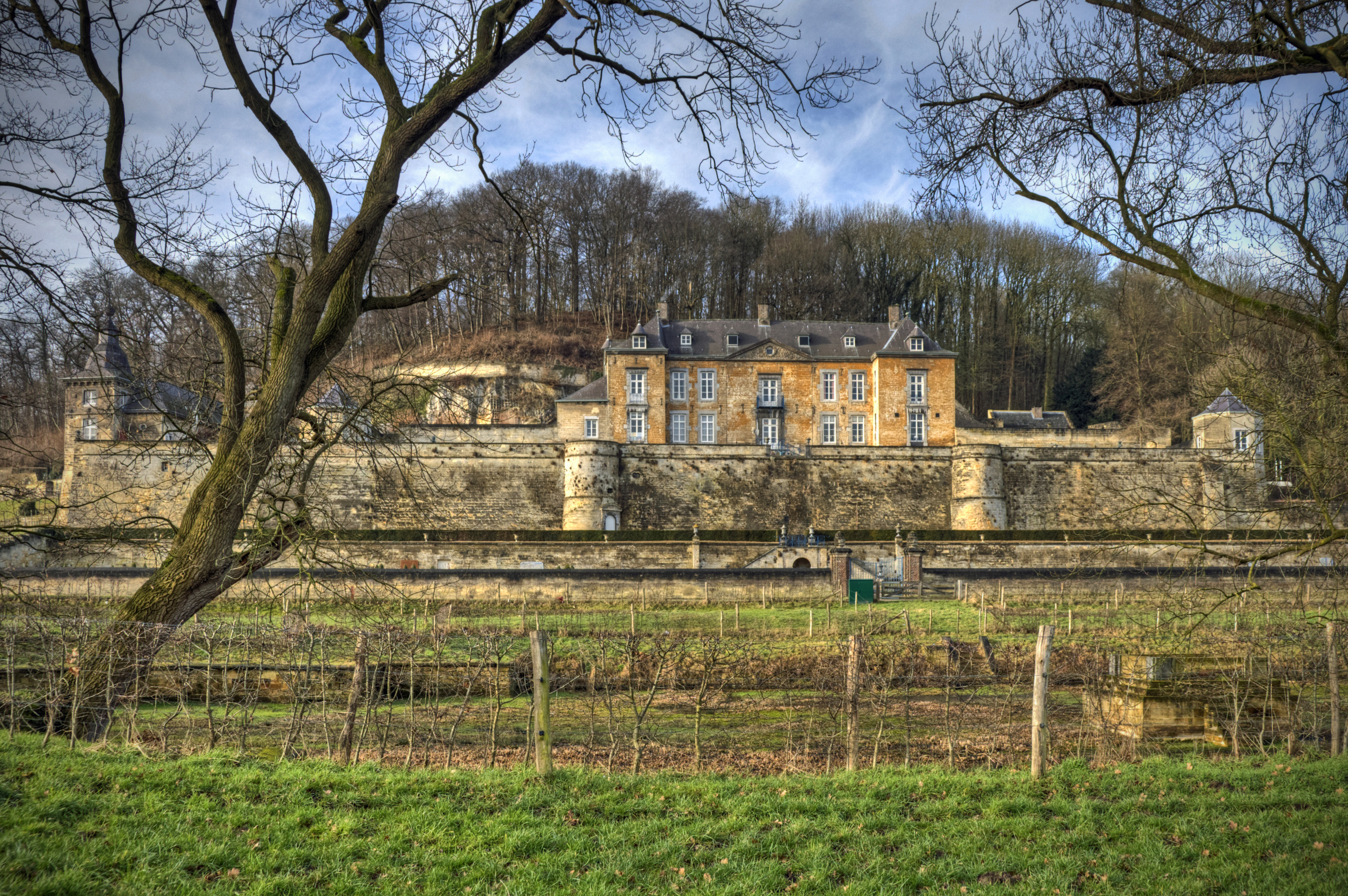
Neercanne castle at Kanne

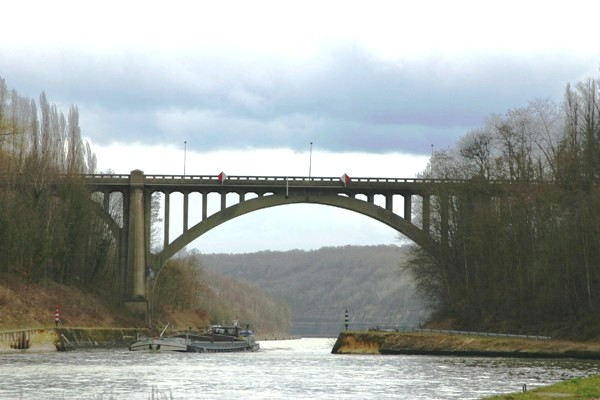
Bridge Albert Canal near Vroenhoven

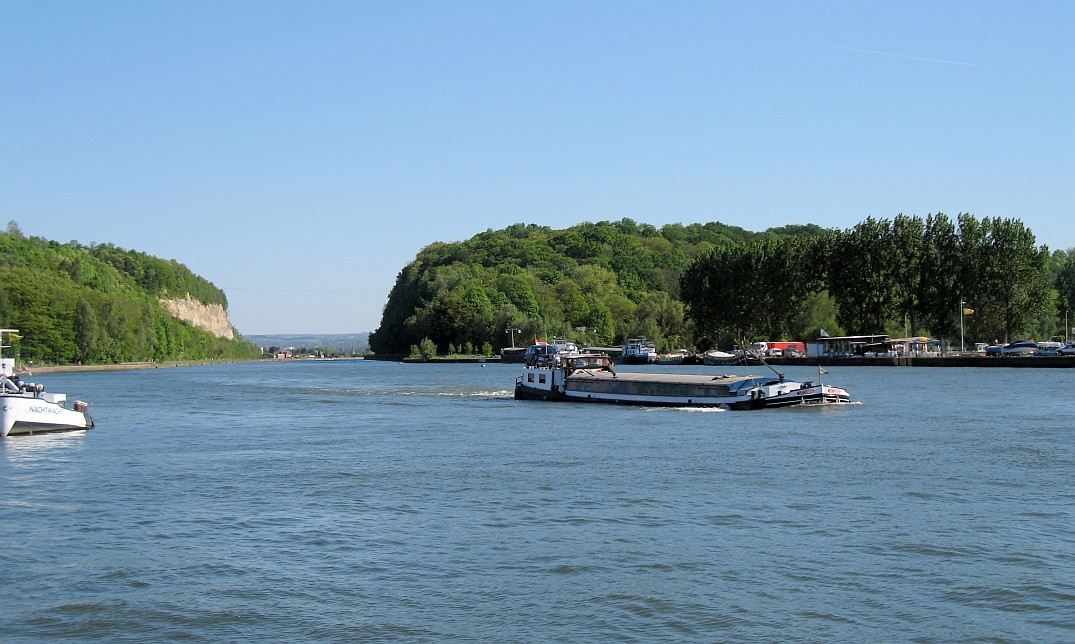
Albert Canal near Kanne
