= 2020 Ineos Grenadiers season =

INEOS Grenadiers
- UCI code: INS
- Status: UCI WorldTeam
- Manager: Dave Brailsford
- Main sponsor(s): Ineos
- Based: National Cycling Centre; Manchester; England
- Bicycles: Pinarello
- Groupset: Shimano

Season victories
- One-day races: 1
- Stage race overall: 3
- Stage race stages: 14
- Grand Tours: 1
- World Championships: 1
- National Championships: 1
- Most wins: Filippo Ganna (7)
- Jersey

The jersey used by the team in 2020 when they were known as Team Ineos.

The 2020 cycling season began in Australia at the Tour Down Under for Team Ineos in January. This is the tenth season for the team and second with the current sponsor. Effective from August 2020 the team became known as Ineos Grenadiers.

== 2020 roster ==
As of 2 February 2020.

| Rider | Date of birth |
|---|---|
| Leonardo Basso (ITA) | 25 December 1993 (aged 26) |
| Egan Bernal (COL) | 13 January 1997 (aged 22) |
| Richard Carapaz (ECU) | 29 May 1993 (aged 26) |
| Jonathan Castroviejo (ESP) | 27 April 1987 (aged 32) |
| Rohan Dennis (AUS) | 28 May 1990 (aged 29) |
| Owain Doull (GBR) | 2 May 1993 (aged 26) |
| Eddie Dunbar (IRL) | 1 September 1996 (aged 23) |
| Chris Froome (GBR) | 20 May 1985 (aged 34) |
| Filippo Ganna (ITA) | 25 July 1996 (aged 23) |
| Tao Geoghegan Hart (GBR) | 30 March 1995 (aged 24) |
| Michał Gołaś (POL) | 29 April 1984 (aged 35) |
| Ethan Hayter (GBR) | 18 September 1998 (aged 21) |
| Sebastián Henao (COL) | 5 August 1993 (aged 26) |
| Vasil Kiryienka (Note: Kiryienka retired from the sport on 30 January.) (BLR) | 28 June 1981 (aged 38) |
| Christian Knees (GER) | 5 March 1981 (aged 38) |

| Rider | Date of birth |
|---|---|
| Michał Kwiatkowski (POL) | 2 June 1990 (aged 29) |
| Chris Lawless (GBR) | 4 November 1995 (aged 24) |
| Gianni Moscon (ITA) | 20 April 1994 (aged 25) |
| Jhonatan Narváez (ECU) | 4 March 1997 (aged 22) |
| Salvatore Puccio (ITA) | 31 August 1989 (aged 30) |
| Brandon Rivera (COL) | 21 March 1996 (aged 23) |
| Carlos Rodriguez (ESP) | 2 February 2001 (aged 18) |
| Luke Rowe (GBR) | 10 March 1990 (aged 29) |
| Pavel Sivakov (RUS) | 11 July 1997 (aged 22) |
| Iván Sosa (COL) | 31 October 1997 (aged 22) |
| Ian Stannard (GBR) | 25 May 1987 (aged 32) |
| Ben Swift (GBR) | 5 November 1987 (aged 32) |
| Geraint Thomas (GBR) | 25 May 1986 (aged 33) |
| Dylan van Baarle (NED) | 21 May 1992 (aged 27) |
| Cameron Wurf (Note: Wurf joined the team on 31 January.) (AUS) | 3 August 1983 (aged 36) |

Riders who joined the team for the 2020 season

| Rider | 2019 team |
|---|---|
| Richard Carapaz | Movistar Team |
| Rohan Dennis | Bahrain–Merida |
| Ethan Hayter | Neo-pro |
| Brandon Rivera | GW–Shimano |
| Carlos Rodriguez | neo-pro (Kometa development team) |
| Cameron Wurf | |

Riders who left the team during or after the 2019 season

| Rider | 2020 team |
|---|---|
| David de la Cruz | UAE Team Emirates |
| Kenny Elissonde | Trek–Segafredo |
| Kristoffer Halvorsen | EF Pro Cycling |
| Wout Poels | Bahrain–McLaren |
| Diego Rosa | Arkéa–Samsic |

== Season victories ==
| Date | Race | Competition | Rider | Country | Location |
|---|---|---|---|---|---|
| 26 January | Tour Down Under, Young rider classification | UCI World Tour | Pavel Sivakov (RUS) | Australia | |
| 26 January | Tour Down Under, Team classification | UCI World Tour | (Note: The riders in the squad were Rohan Dennis, Owain Doull, Chris Lawless, Luke Rowe, Pavel Sivakov, Ian Stannard and Dylan van Baarle.) | Australia | |
| 16 February | Tour de la Provence, Stage 4 | UCI Europe Tour; UCI ProSeries | Owain Doull (GBR) | France | Aix-en-Provence |
| 23 February | Volta ao Algarve, Team classification | UCI Europe Tour; UCI ProSeries | (Note: The riders in the squad were Rohan Dennis, Michał Kwiatkowski, Luke Rowe, Ben Swift, Geraint Thomas, Dylan van Baarle and Cameron Wurf.) | Portugal | |
| 1 August | Vuelta a Burgos, Stage 5 | UCI Europe Tour; UCI ProSeries | Iván Sosa (COL) | Spain | Lagunas de Neila |
| 3 August | Route d'Occitanie, Stage 3 | UCI Europe Tour | Egan Bernal (COL) | France | Col de Beyrède |
| 4 August | Route d'Occitanie, Overall | UCI Europe Tour | Egan Bernal (COL) | France | |
| 4 August | Route d'Occitanie, Points classification | UCI Europe Tour | Egan Bernal (COL) | France | |
| 4 August | Route d'Occitanie, Young rider classification | UCI Europe Tour | Egan Bernal (COL) | France | |
| 7 August | Tour de Pologne, Stage 3 | UCI World Tour | Richard Carapaz (ECU) | Poland | Bielsko-Biała |
| 19 August | Tour de Wallonie, Mountains classification | UCI Europe Tour; UCI ProSeries | Michał Gołaś (POL) | Belgium | |
| 19 August | Tour de Wallonie, Young rider classification | UCI Europe Tour; UCI ProSeries | Jhonatan Narváez (ECU) | Belgium | |
| 3 September | Settimana Internazionale di Coppi e Bartali, Stage 3 | UCI Europe Tour | Jhonatan Narváez (ECU) | Italy | Riccione |
| 4 September | Settimana Internazionale di Coppi e Bartali, Overall | UCI Europe Tour | Jhonatan Narváez (ECU) | Italy | |
| 4 September | Settimana Internazionale di Coppi e Bartali, Points classification | UCI Europe Tour | Jhonatan Narváez (ECU) | Italy | |
| 4 September | Settimana Internazionale di Coppi e Bartali, Young rider classification | UCI Europe Tour | Jhonatan Narváez (ECU) | Italy | |
| 14 September | Tirreno–Adriatico, Stage 8 | UCI World Tour | Filippo Ganna (ITA) | Italy | San Benedetto del Tronto |
| 17 September | Tour de France, Stage 18 | UCI World Tour | Michał Kwiatkowski (POL) | France | La Roche-sur-Foron |
| 19 September | Giro dell'Appennino | UCI Europe Tour | Ethan Hayter (GBR) | Italy | Genova |
| 3 October | Giro d'Italia, Stage 1 | UCI World Tour | Filippo Ganna (ITA) | Italy | Palermo |
| 7 October | Giro d'Italia, Stage 5 | UCI World Tour | Filippo Ganna (ITA) | Italy | Camigliatello Silano |
| 15 October | Giro d'Italia, Stage 12 | UCI World Tour | Jhonatan Narváez (ECU) | Italy | Cesenatico |
| 17 October | Giro d'Italia, Stage 14 | UCI World Tour | Filippo Ganna (ITA) | Italy | Valdobbiadene |
| 18 October | Giro d'Italia, Stage 15 | UCI World Tour | Tao Geoghegan Hart (GBR) | Italy | Piancavallo |
| 20 October | Giro d'Italia, Stage 20 | UCI World Tour | Tao Geoghegan Hart (GBR) | Italy | Sestriere |
| 25 October | Giro d'Italia, Stage 21 | UCI World Tour | Filippo Ganna (ITA) | Italy | Milan |
| 25 October | Giro d'Italia, Overall | UCI World Tour | Tao Geoghegan Hart (GBR) | Italy | |
| 25 October | Giro d'Italia, Young rider classification | UCI World Tour | Tao Geoghegan Hart (GBR) | Italy | |
| 25 October | Giro d'Italia, Teams classification | UCI World Tour | (Note: The riders in the squad were Jonathan Castroviejo, Rohan Dennis, Filippo Ganna, Tao Geoghegan Hart, Jhonatan Narváez, Salvatore Puccio, Ben Swift, and Geraint Thomas.) | Italy | |

== National, Continental and World champions ==
| Date | Discipline | Jersey | Rider | Country | Location |
|---|---|---|---|---|---|
| 21 August | Italian National Time Trial Champion | | Filippo Ganna (ITA) | Italy | Bassano del Grappa |
| 25 September | World Time Trial Champion | | Filippo Ganna (ITA) | Italy | Imola |
