= Paul Martens =

German racing cyclist

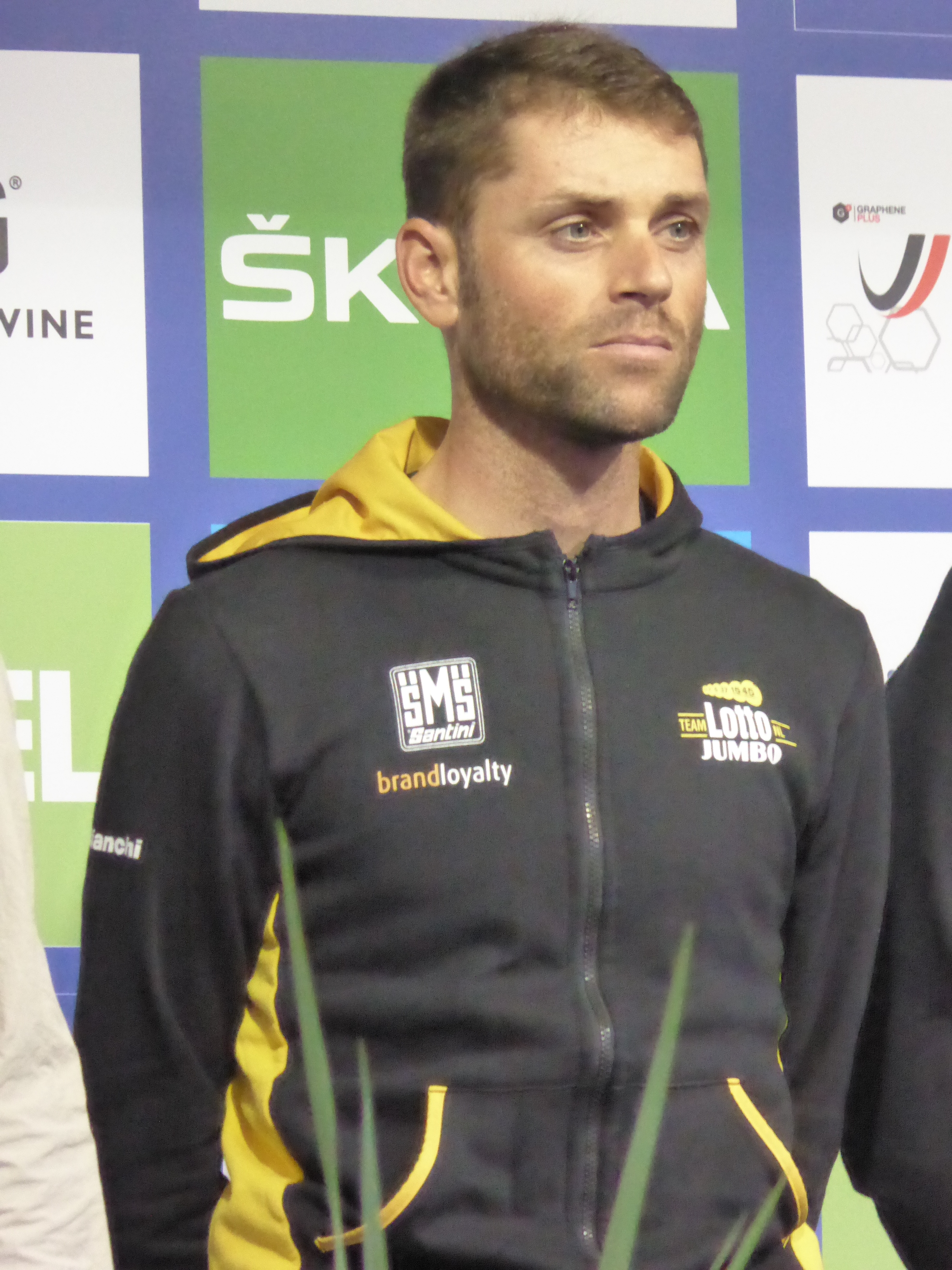
- Martens at the 2016 Tour of Britain.

Personal information
- Full name: Paul Martens
- Born: 26 October 1983 (age 43) Rostock, East Germany
- Height: 1.78 m (5 ft 10 in)
- Weight: 69 kg (152 lb; 10 st 12 lb)

Cycling career
- Sport: Cycling
- Current team: Retired
- Discipline: Road
- Role: Rider

Amateur teams
- 2001: Mecklenburg Vorpommern
- 2004: Frankfurter RC 90
- 2004: Team Ispo Lotusan Cottbus
- 2005: Berliner TSC
- 2005: KED Bianchi–Berlin
- 2005: T-Mobile Team (stagiaire)

Professional teams
- 2006–2007: Skil–Shimano
- 2008–2021: Rabobank

Major wins
- Stage races Tour de Luxembourg (2013)

Paul Martens (born 26 October 1983) is a German former professional road bicycle racer, who rode professionally between 2006 and 2021 for the Skil–Shimano and Team Jumbo–Visma teams. Martens achieved seven victories during his professional career, including a stage win and a general classification win at the Tour de Luxembourg, and stage wins at the Volta ao Algarve, the Vuelta a Burgos and the Tour of Belgium.

== Career ==
=== Amateur years ===
Martens started racing junior level events in 2000 showing no particular specialization finishing in the middle of the pack in the Niedersachsen Juniors and Cottbuser Juniors races. In 2001 he started to show some form finishing 3rd in Stage 1 of the Trofeo Karlsberg beating the chasing peloton by 2 seconds. Later in the year he finished 10th overall at the Münsterland Tour Juniors, a race he would win the senior version of later in his career. In 2002 he rode the Jadranska Magistrala finishing 56th overall with his best result coming in the stage 3 sprint where he finished 16th. In late May 2002 he rode the Tour de Berlin where he finished 13th overall but was the first rider born in 1983 or later so he won the young rider classification.

He started 2003 with a win in the Rund um Sebnitz in Germany, and he also took a podium placing on Stage 1 of the Tour de Berlin. 2004 saw Martens finish second at the under-23 German National Time Trial Championships, and finished 13th in both the European and World under-23 time trials later in the season. Martens signed for amateur team KED Bianchi Team Berlin for the 2005 season, this gave him a calendar with more UCI races over the year. He started the year with a win at the Harzrundfahrt national event, followed by 5th in the Stage 1 sprint of Circuit des Ardennes and a win at the Under-23 German National Time Trial Championships. For the later part of the 2005 season he was a stagiaire at UCI ProTeam T-Mobile Team.

=== Skil–Shimano (2006–2007) ===
In November 2005 Skil–Shimano announced they had signed Martens to their team on a two-year contract.

==== 2006 ====
Martens' professional career began in Qatar with the International Grand Prix Doha where he finished in second-to-last position, nearly 4' 30" down on the winner. Having acted as a domestique in his next starts in stage races, Martens moved onto the Cobbled classics and Ardennes classics. Martens contested, for the only time in his career, the Tour of Flanders and Paris–Roubaix, finishing just the latter and at almost 20 minutes down in 99th position. He recorded two top-10 stage finishes at April's Rheinland-Pfalz Rundfahrt, followed by a top 10 in Stage 4 of Tour de Picardie the following month. The Tour de Luxembourg brought Martens' first professional win, winning Stage 3 ahead of eventual overall winner Christian Vande Velde. Martens' second professional win came at the Münsterland Giro where he took the early breakaway and held the peloton off by two seconds.

==== 2007 ====
Martens started 2007 at the Vuelta a Andalucía where he finished 6th in the bunch sprint of stage 2 and ended 21st overall after the 5 stages. He failed to finish at Omloop Het Volk and the Nokere Koerse, but finished third at the Grand Prix Rudy Dhaenens. The first top-10 result in a stage race came at the final edition of Rheinland-Pfalz Rundfahrt where Martens finished 4th in Stage 3 and then 2nd in Stage 4 to finish 5th overall, 16 seconds down on the winner. At the Tour de Luxembourg in June, Martens finished in the top-10 in 3 stages and ultimately finished 4th overall, 25 seconds down on the winner. Stage 3 of the Ster Elektrotoer was won by Martens from a reduced bunch sprint after a hilly battle on the Cauberg, which earned him the race leader's jersey; he lost the race lead to Sebastian Langeveld on the final day and finished second overall. In August he raced the Rund um die Hainleite where he came third in another reduced bunch sprint. His last major result came at the Eneco Tour where he finished 9th overall.

=== Rabobank (2008–2021) ===
In October 2007, Martens announced he would ride for UCI ProTeam Rabobank from 2008 on an initial two-year contract, saying his three professional wins in two years at Skil–Shimano were impressive.

==== 2008–2009 ====
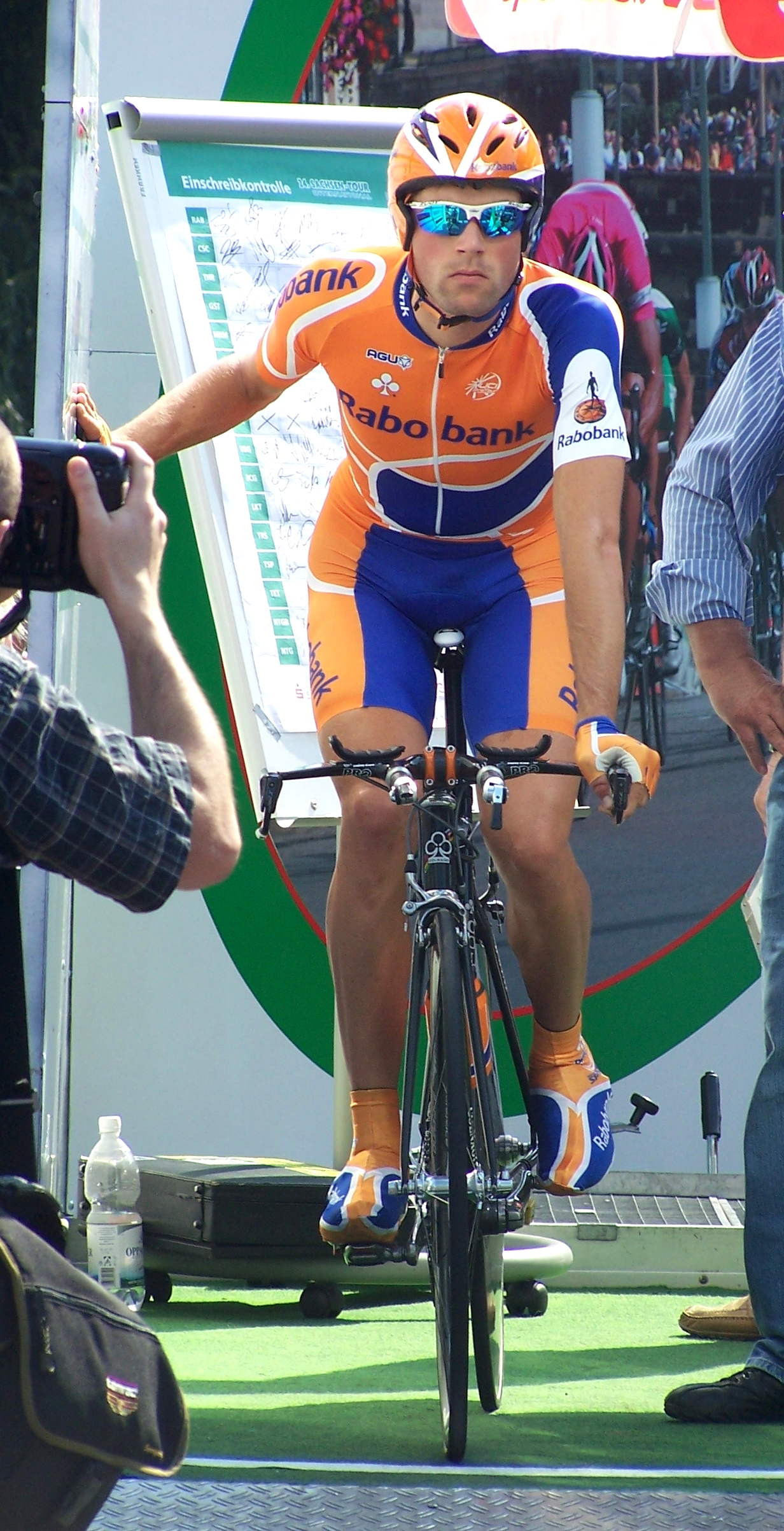
Martens at the 2008 Sachsen Tour, where he finished in eighth overall

In his first season with the team, Martens took top-ten overall finishes at the Ster Elektrotoer (sixth), the Regio-Tour (sixth) and the Sachsen Tour (eighth), and he finished in tenth at the Coppa Sabatini one-day race. The following year, he finished on the podium at the GP Ouest-France – held as part of the UCI ProTour – where he finished third behind Simon Gerrans and Pierrick Fédrigo. He also recorded top-ten results at the Eschborn–Frankfurt City Loop (fifth), the Giro del Piemonte (sixth), and a repeat of his eighth-place overall finish from the previous year, at the Sachsen Tour.

==== 2010s ====
He recorded his first victory with Rabobank in 2010, winning the Grand Prix de Wallonie, ahead of Riccardo Riccò and Cadel Evans. He also recorded fourth-place finishes at Brabantse Pijl, Paris–Brussels and the Gran Premio Bruno Beghelli, while also finishing in the top-ten placings at the Grote Prijs Jef Scherens (sixth), and the E3 Prijs Vlaanderen (eighth). In 2011, Martens recorded tenth-place finishes in two of the Ardennes classics – at the Amstel Gold Race and La Flèche Wallonne. At the 2012 Vuelta a Burgos, Martens took a stage victory on the penultimate day of the race, winning on an uphill finish at Clunia.

On his first race day of the 2013 season, Martens won the opening stage of the Volta ao Algarve into Albufeira; he and Tiago Machado had gone clear of the field within the closing stages, and they managed to remain clear while teammate Theo Bos led home the peloton in third place, a few metres behind. Later in the spring, he finished third in the Volta Limburg Classic in a sprint finish of a select group of riders. In June, Martens took his first overall stage race success, by winning the general classification at the Tour de Luxembourg; he was third overall heading into final stage, but was able to overhaul Jonathan Hivert and Matthias Brändle on the hilly finishing circuit in Luxembourg City, and took the overall victory by four seconds ahead of Hivert. He later took top-ten overall finishes at the Tour de Wallonie (ninth) and the Arctic Race of Norway (fifth).

In June 2014, Martens won the final, hilly stage of the Tour of Belgium in a sprint finish in Oreye. He then finished second to Mathieu van der Poel at the Ronde van Limburg, and fourth overall at the Ster ZLM Toer in his next two starts. Martens made his Tour de France début in 2015, but he took no further individual wins over the next few years, with his best result coming at the 2017 Volta Limburg Classic, where he finished in fifth place, behind the lead group.

==== 2020–2021 ====
In February 2020, Martens announced that he would retire from cycling at the end of the season; however, due to the COVID-19 pandemic, Martens intended to prolong his career until the middle of the 2021 season. He retired following the 2021 Giro d'Italia, where he finished 99th.

== Major results ==
2001
1st Madison (with Florian Piper), National Junior Track Championships
10th Overall Münsterland Tour Juniors
2002
1st Young rider classification, Tour de Berlin
2003
1st Rund um Sebnitz
2004
2nd Time trial, National Under-23 Road Championships
2005
1st Time trial, National Under-23 Road Championships
1st Harzrundfahrt
2006
1st Münsterland Giro
1st Stage 2 Tour de Luxembourg
2007
2nd Overall Ster Elektrotoer

1st Stage 2

3rd Rund um die Hainleite
3rd Grand Prix Rudy Dhaenens
4th Overall Tour de Luxembourg
5th Overall Rheinland-Pfalz Rundfahrt
9th Overall Eneco Tour
2008
6th Overall Ster Elektrotoer
6th Overall Regio-Tour
8th Overall Sachsen Tour
10th Coppa Sabatini
2009
3rd GP Ouest-France
5th Eschborn–Frankfurt City Loop
6th Giro del Piemonte
8th Overall Sachsen Tour
2010
1st Grand Prix de Wallonie
4th Brabantse Pijl
4th Paris–Brussels
4th Gran Premio Bruno Beghelli
6th Grote Prijs Jef Scherens
8th E3 Prijs Vlaanderen
2011
10th Amstel Gold Race
10th La Flèche Wallonne
2012
1st Stage 4 Vuelta a Burgos
2013
1st Overall Tour de Luxembourg
1st Stage 1 Volta ao Algarve
3rd Volta Limburg Classic
5th Overall Arctic Race of Norway
9th Overall Tour de Wallonie
2014
1st Stage 5 Tour of Belgium
2nd Ronde van Limburg
4th Overall Ster ZLM Toer
2015
10th Overall Tour du Poitou-Charentes
2017
5th Volta Limburg Classic
10th Cadel Evans Great Ocean Road Race
2019
1st Stage 1 (TTT) UAE Tour

=== Grand Tour general classification results timeline ===
Grand Tour	2008	2009	2010	2011	2012	2013	2014	2015	2016	2017	2018	2019	2020	2021
Giro d'Italia	78	—	—	—	—	63	—	—	—	—	—	75	—	99
Tour de France	—	—	—	—	—	—	—	80	98	82	81	—	—	—
/ Vuelta a España	—	DNF	—	119	—	—	58	—	—	—	—	—	109	—

Legend
—	Did not compete
DNF	Did not finish
