= 2020 Route d'Occitanie =

2020 UCI Europe Tour

Race details
- Dates: 1–4 August 2020
- Stages: 4
- Distance: 720 km (447.4 mi)
- Winning time: 17h 57' 27"

Results
Jersey awarded to the overall winner	Winner	Egan Bernal (COL)	(Team Ineos)
	Second	Pavel Sivakov (RUS)	(Team Ineos)
	Third	Aleksandr Vlasov (RUS)	(Astana)
Jersey awarded to the points classification winner	Points	Egan Bernal (COL)	(Team Ineos)
Jersey awarded to the mountains classification winner	Mountains	Lilian Calmejane (FRA)	(Total Direct Énergie)
Jersey awarded to the youth classification winner	Youth	Egan Bernal (COL)	(Team Ineos)
	Team	Trek–Segafredo	

The 2020 Route d'Occitanie was a men's road bicycle race which took place from 1 to 4 August 2020 in France. It was the 44th edition of the Route d'Occitanie. The race was rated as a 2.1 event and formed part of the 2020 UCI Europe Tour.

== Teams ==
Twenty-one teams participated in the race. The teams that participated were:

UCI WorldTeams

- AG2R La Mondiale
- Astana
- Bahrain–McLaren
- CCC Team
- Cofidis
- Groupama–FDJ
- Team Ineos
- Trek–Segafredo

UCI Professional Continental Teams

- Arkéa–Samsic
- Bardiani–CSF–Faizanè
- B&B Hotels–Vital Concept
- Caja Rural–Seguros RGA
- Circus–Wanty Gobert
- Euskaltel–Euskadi
- Nippo–Delko–One Provence
- Riwal Readynez
- Total Direct Énergie

UCI Continental Teams

- Bike Aid
- Equipo Kern Pharma
- Natura4Ever–Roubaix–Lille Métropole
- St. Michel–Auber93

== Route ==
Stage characteristics and winners
Stage	Date	Course	Distance	Type	Stage winner
1	1 August	Saint-Affrique to Cazouls-lès-Béziers	187 km (116 mi)	Hilly stage	Bryan Coquard (FRA)
2	2 August	Carcassonne to Cap Découverte	174.5 km (108.4 mi)	Hilly stage	Sonny Colbrelli (ITA)
3	3 August	Saint-Gaudens to Col de Beyrède	163.5 km (101.6 mi)	Mountain stage	Egan Bernal (COL)
4	4 August	Lectoure to Rocamadour	195 km (121 mi)	Hilly stage	Benoît Cosnefroy (FRA)
Total		720 km (450 mi)			

== Stages ==
=== Stage 1 ===
1 August 2020 – Saint-Affrique to Cazouls-lès-Béziers, 187 km (116 mi)

Stage 1 Result
Rank	Rider	Team	Time
1	Bryan Coquard (FRA)	B&B Hotels–Vital Concept	4h 35' 00"
2	Elia Viviani (ITA)	Cofidis	+ 0"
3	Sonny Colbrelli (ITA)	Bahrain–McLaren	+ 0"
4	Andrea Pasqualon (ITA)	Circus–Wanty Gobert	+ 0"
5	Clément Venturini (FRA)	AG2R La Mondiale	+ 0"
6	Egan Bernal (COL)	Team Ineos	+ 0"
7	Josef Černý (CZE)	CCC Team	+ 0"
8	Romain Bardet (FRA)	AG2R La Mondiale	+ 0"
9	Anthony Maldonado (FRA)	St. Michel–Auber93	+ 0"
10	Nick van der Lijke (NED)	Riwal Readynez	+ 0"

General classification after Stage 1
Rank	Rider	Team	Time
1	Bryan Coquard (FRA)	B&B Hotels–Vital Concept	4h 34' 50"
2	Elia Viviani (ITA)	Cofidis	+ 4"
3	Lilian Calmejane (FRA)	Total Direct Énergie	+ 5"
4	Sonny Colbrelli (ITA)	Bahrain–McLaren	+ 6"
5	Andreas Kron (DEN)	Riwal Readynez	+ 9"
6	Andrea Pasqualon (ITA)	Circus–Wanty Gobert	+ 10"
7	Clément Venturini (FRA)	AG2R La Mondiale	+ 10"
8	Egan Bernal (COL)	Team Ineos	+ 10"
9	Josef Černý (CZE)	CCC Team	+ 10"
10	Romain Bardet (FRA)	AG2R La Mondiale	+ 10"

=== Stage 2 ===
2 August 2020 – Carcassonne to Cap Découverte, 174.5 km (108.4 mi)

Stage 2 Result
Rank	Rider	Team	Time
1	Sonny Colbrelli (ITA)	Bahrain–McLaren	4h 22' 23"
2	Bryan Coquard (FRA)	B&B Hotels–Vital Concept	+ 0"
3	Niccolò Bonifazio (ITA)	Total Direct Énergie	+ 0"
4	Arvid de Kleijn (NED)	Riwal Readynez	+ 0"
5	Clément Venturini (FRA)	AG2R La Mondiale	+ 0"
6	Andrea Pasqualon (ITA)	Circus–Wanty Gobert	+ 0"
7	Matteo Malucelli (ITA)	Caja Rural–Seguros RGA	+ 0"
8	Elia Viviani (ITA)	Cofidis	+ 0"
9	Warren Barguil (FRA)	Arkéa–Samsic	+ 0"
10	David González (ESP)	Caja Rural–Seguros RGA	+ 0"

General classification after Stage 2
Rank	Rider	Team	Time
1	Bryan Coquard (FRA)	B&B Hotels–Vital Concept	8h 57' 07"
2	Sonny Colbrelli (ITA)	Bahrain–McLaren	+ 2"
3	Elia Viviani (ITA)	Cofidis	+ 10"
4	Lilian Calmejane (FRA)	Total Direct Énergie	+ 11"
5	Niccolò Bonifazio (ITA)	Total Direct Énergie	+ 12"
6	Michał Paluta (POL)	CCC Team	+ 12"
7	Emil Vinjebo (DEN)	Riwal Readynez	+ 12"
8	Ibai Azurmendi (ESP)	Euskaltel–Euskadi	+ 15"
9	Andreas Kron (DEN)	Riwal Readynez	+ 15"
10	Clément Venturini (FRA)	AG2R La Mondiale	+ 16"

=== Stage 3 ===
3 August 2020 – Saint-Gaudens to Col de Beyrède, 163.5 km (101.6 mi)

Stage 3 Result
Rank	Rider	Team	Time
1	Egan Bernal (COL)	Team Ineos	4h 36' 44"
2	Pavel Sivakov (RUS)	Team Ineos	+ 10"
3	Aleksandr Vlasov (RUS)	Astana	+ 17"
4	Thibaut Pinot (FRA)	Groupama–FDJ	+ 31"
5	Bauke Mollema (NED)	Trek–Segafredo	+ 1' 05"
6	Warren Barguil (FRA)	Arkéa–Samsic	+ 1' 09"
7	Richie Porte (AUS)	Trek–Segafredo	+ 1' 11"
8	Romain Bardet (FRA)	AG2R La Mondiale	+ 1' 18"
9	Rafael Valls (ESP)	Bahrain–McLaren	+ 1' 39"
10	Sébastien Reichenbach (SUI)	Groupama–FDJ	+ 1' 39"

General classification after Stage 3
Rank	Rider	Team	Time
1	Egan Bernal (COL)	Team Ineos	13h 33' 57"
2	Pavel Sivakov (RUS)	Team Ineos	+ 14"
3	Aleksandr Vlasov (RUS)	Astana	+ 23"
4	Thibaut Pinot (FRA)	Groupama–FDJ	+ 41"
5	Bauke Mollema (NED)	Trek–Segafredo	+ 1' 15"
6	Warren Barguil (FRA)	Arkéa–Samsic	+ 1' 19"
7	Richie Porte (AUS)	Trek–Segafredo	+ 1' 21"
8	Romain Bardet (FRA)	AG2R La Mondiale	+ 1' 28"
9	Rafael Valls (ESP)	Bahrain–McLaren	+ 1' 49"
10	Sébastien Reichenbach (SUI)	Groupama–FDJ	+ 1' 49"

=== Stage 4 ===
4 August 2020 – Lectoure to Rocamadour, 195 km (121 mi)

Stage 4 Result
Rank	Rider	Team	Time
1	Benoît Cosnefroy (FRA)	AG2R La Mondiale	4h 23' 28"
2	Bauke Mollema (NED)	Trek–Segafredo	+ 2"
3	Thibaut Pinot (FRA)	Groupama–FDJ	+ 2"
4	Egan Bernal (COL)	Team Ineos	+ 2"
5	Aleksandr Vlasov (RUS)	Astana	+ 2"
6	Alexis Vuillermoz (FRA)	AG2R La Mondiale	+ 7"
7	Pavel Sivakov (RUS)	Team Ineos	+ 7"
8	Richie Porte (AUS)	Trek–Segafredo	+ 7"
9	Rafael Valls (ESP)	Bahrain–McLaren	+ 10"
10	Warren Barguil (FRA)	Arkéa–Samsic	+ 12"

Final general classification
Rank	Rider	Team	Time
1	Egan Bernal (COL)	Team Ineos	17h 57' 27"
2	Pavel Sivakov (RUS)	Team Ineos	+ 19"
3	Aleksandr Vlasov (RUS)	Astana	+ 23"
4	Thibaut Pinot (FRA)	Groupama–FDJ	+ 37"
5	Bauke Mollema (NED)	Trek–Segafredo	+ 1' 09"
6	Richie Porte (AUS)	Trek–Segafredo	+ 1' 26"
7	Warren Barguil (FRA)	Arkéa–Samsic	+ 1' 29"
8	Romain Bardet (FRA)	AG2R La Mondiale	+ 1' 52"
9	Rafael Valls (ESP)	Bahrain–McLaren	+ 1' 57"
10	Sébastien Reichenbach (SUI)	Groupama–FDJ	+ 2' 06"

== Classification leadership ==
Classification leadership by stage
Stage	Winner	General classification	Points classification	Mountains classification	Young rider classification	Team classification
1	Bryan Coquard	Bryan Coquard	Bryan Coquard	Andreas Kron	Andreas Kron	AG2R La Mondiale
2	Sonny Colbrelli	Bryan Coquard	Bryan Coquard	Andreas Kron	Michał Paluta	AG2R La Mondiale
3	Egan Bernal	Egan Bernal	Bryan Coquard	Lilian Calmejane	Egan Bernal	Groupama–FDJ
4	Benoît Cosnefroy	Egan Bernal	Egan Bernal	Lilian Calmejane	Egan Bernal	Trek–Segafredo
Final		Egan Bernal	Egan Bernal	Lilian Calmejane	Egan Bernal	Trek–Segafredo

- On stage two, Elia Viviani, who was second in the points classification, wore the green jersey, because first placed Bryan Coquard wore the orange jersey as leader of the general classification.
- On stage two, Egan Bernal, who was second in the young rider classification, wore the white jersey, because first placed Andreas Kron wore the blue polkadot jersey as leader of the mountains classification.
- On stages three and four, Pavel Sivakov, who was second in the young rider classification, wore the white jersey, because first placed Egan Bernal wore the orange jersey as leader of the general classification.

== Final classification standings ==
Legend
Denotes the winner of the general classification	Denotes the winner of the mountains classification
Denotes the winner of the points classification	Denotes the winner of the young rider classification

=== General classification ===
Final general classification(1–10)
Rank	Rider	Team	Time
1	Egan Bernal (COL)	Team Ineos	17h 57' 27"
2	Pavel Sivakov (RUS)	Team Ineos	+ 19"
3	Aleksandr Vlasov (RUS)	Astana	+ 23"
4	Thibaut Pinot (FRA)	Groupama–FDJ	+ 37"
5	Bauke Mollema (NED)	Trek–Segafredo	+ 1' 09"
6	Richie Porte (AUS)	Trek–Segafredo	+ 1' 26"
7	Warren Barguil (FRA)	Arkéa–Samsic	+ 1' 29"
8	Romain Bardet (FRA)	AG2R La Mondiale	+ 1' 52"
9	Rafael Valls (ESP)	Bahrain–McLaren	+ 1' 57"
10	Sébastien Reichenbach (SUI)	Groupama–FDJ	+ 2' 06"

=== Points classification ===
Final points classification (1–10)
Rank	Rider	Team	Points
1	Egan Bernal (COL)	Team Ineos	37
2	Bryan Coquard (FRA)	B&B Hotels–Vital Concept	37
3	Sonny Colbrelli (ITA)	Bahrain–McLaren	35
4	Elia Viviani (ITA)	Cofidis	25
5	Andrea Pasqualon (ITA)	Circus–Wanty Gobert	23
6	Clément Venturini (FRA)	AG2R La Mondiale	22
7	Bauke Mollema (NED)	Trek–Segafredo	19
8	Thibaut Pinot (FRA)	Groupama–FDJ	18
9	Benoît Cosnefroy (FRA)	AG2R La Mondiale	17
10	Pavel Sivakov (RUS)	Team Ineos	17

=== Mountains classification ===
Final mountains classification (1–10)
Rank	Rider	Team	Points
1	Lilian Calmejane (FRA)	Total Direct Énergie	33
2	Harold Tejada (COL)	Astana	20
3	Georg Zimmermann (GER)	CCC Team	17
4	Julien Bernard (FRA)	Trek–Segafredo	16
5	Egan Bernal (COL)	Team Ineos	12
6	Martí Márquez (ESP)	Equipo Kern Pharma	10
7	Pavel Sivakov (RUS)	Team Ineos	10
8	Benoît Cosnefroy (FRA)	AG2R La Mondiale	10
9	Aleksandr Vlasov (RUS)	Astana	8
10	Matthieu Ladagnous (FRA)	Groupama–FDJ	8

=== Young rider classification ===
Final young rider classification (1–10)
Rank	Rider	Team	Time
1	Egan Bernal (COL)	Team Ineos	17h 57' 27"
2	Pavel Sivakov (RUS)	Team Ineos	+ 19"
3	Aleksandr Vlasov (RUS)	Astana	+ 23"
4	Rémy Rochas (FRA)	Nippo–Delko–One Provence	+ 2' 15"
5	Valentin Madouas (FRA)	Groupama–FDJ	+ 2' 52"
6	Jhojan García (COL)	Caja Rural–Seguros RGA	+ 3' 02"
7	Giovanni Carboni (ITA)	Bardiani–CSF–Faizanè	+ 4' 00"
8	Niklas Eg (DEN)	Trek–Segafredo	+ 4' 15"
9	Álvaro Cuadros (ESP)	Caja Rural–Seguros RGA	+ 5' 29"
10	Michel Ries (LUX)	Trek–Segafredo	+ 7' 46"

=== Teams classification ===
Final teams classification (1–10)
Rank	Team	Time
1	Trek–Segafredo	53h 57' 51"
2	Groupama–FDJ	+ 9"
3	AG2R La Mondiale	+ 59"
4	Astana	+ 2' 51"
5	Team Ineos	+ 3' 00"
6	Bahrain–McLaren	+ 3' 18"
7	Caja Rural–Seguros RGA	+ 6' 20"
8	Arkéa–Samsic	+ 13' 41"
9	Circus–Wanty Gobert	+ 13' 52"
10	Nippo–Delko–One Provence	+ 22' 46"
