= Coppa Italia (disambiguation) =

Coppa Italia (English: "Italy Cup") is the men's association football tournament.

Coppa Italia may also refer to:

== Association football ==
- Italian Women's Cup, women's tournament
- Coppa Italia Serie C, reserved for Serie C teams
- Coppa Italia Serie D, reserved for Serie D teams
- Coppa Italia Dilettanti, reserved for Eccellenza and Promozione teams

== Other sports ==
- Italian Basketball Cup
- Coppa Italia (ice hockey)
- Italian Road Cycling Cup
- Coppa Italia (rugby union)
- Coppa Italia (men's water polo)
