= Beghelli =

Beghelli may refer to:

- Gran Premio Bruno Beghelli, a men's road bicycle race held annually in Monteveglio, Italy
- Beghelli Bologna, a basketball club based in Bologna, Italy
