= 2018 Brabantse Pijl =

- Event poster with previous winner Sonny Colbrelli

Race details
- Dates: 11 April 2018
- Stages: 1
- Distance: 201.9 km (125.5 mi)
- Winning time: 4h 42' 48"

Results
	Winner	Tim Wellens (BEL)	(Lotto–Soudal)
	Second	Sonny Colbrelli (ITA)	(Bahrain–Merida)
	Third	Tiesj Benoot (BEL)	(Lotto–Soudal)

The 2018 Brabantse Pijl was the 58th edition of the Brabantse Pijl cycling race, held on 11 April 2018. It started in Leuven and finished in Overijse. Tim Wellens of Lotto won the race.

== Teams ==
A total of 21 teams participated in the race, including 7 UCI WorldTeams and 14 UCI Professional Continental teams. Each team had a maximum of seven riders.

UCI WorldTeams

- Bahrain–Merida
- Lotto–Soudal
- Quick-Step Floors
- LottoNL–Jumbo
- BMC Racing Team
- Mitchelton–Scott
- Team Dimension Data

UCI Professional Continental teams

- Aqua Blue Sport
- Cofidis
- Israel Cycling Academy
- Roompot–Nederlandse Loterij
- Fortuneo–Samsic
- Vérandas Willems–Crelan
- Wanty–Groupe Gobert
- CCC–Sprandi–Polkowice
- Direct Énergie
- Nippo–Vini Fantini–Europa Ovini
- Sport Vlaanderen–Baloise
- Team Novo Nordisk
- Vital Concept
- WB Aqua Protect Veranclassic

== Result ==
Final general classification

Rank	Rider	Time
1	Tim Wellens (BEL)	4h 42' 48"
2	Sonny Colbrelli (ITA)	+ 9"
3	Tiesj Benoot (BEL)	+ 9"
4	Pieter Serry (BEL)	+ 9"
5	Jan Tratnik (SLO)	+ 9"
6	Andrea Pasqualon (ITA)	+ 9"
7	Dylan Teuns (BEL)	+ 9"
8	Huub Duyn (NED)	+ 12"
9	Thomas Sprengers (BEL)	+ 14"
10	Daryl Impey (RSA)	+ 14"
