= Andrea Pasqualon =

Italian road cyclist

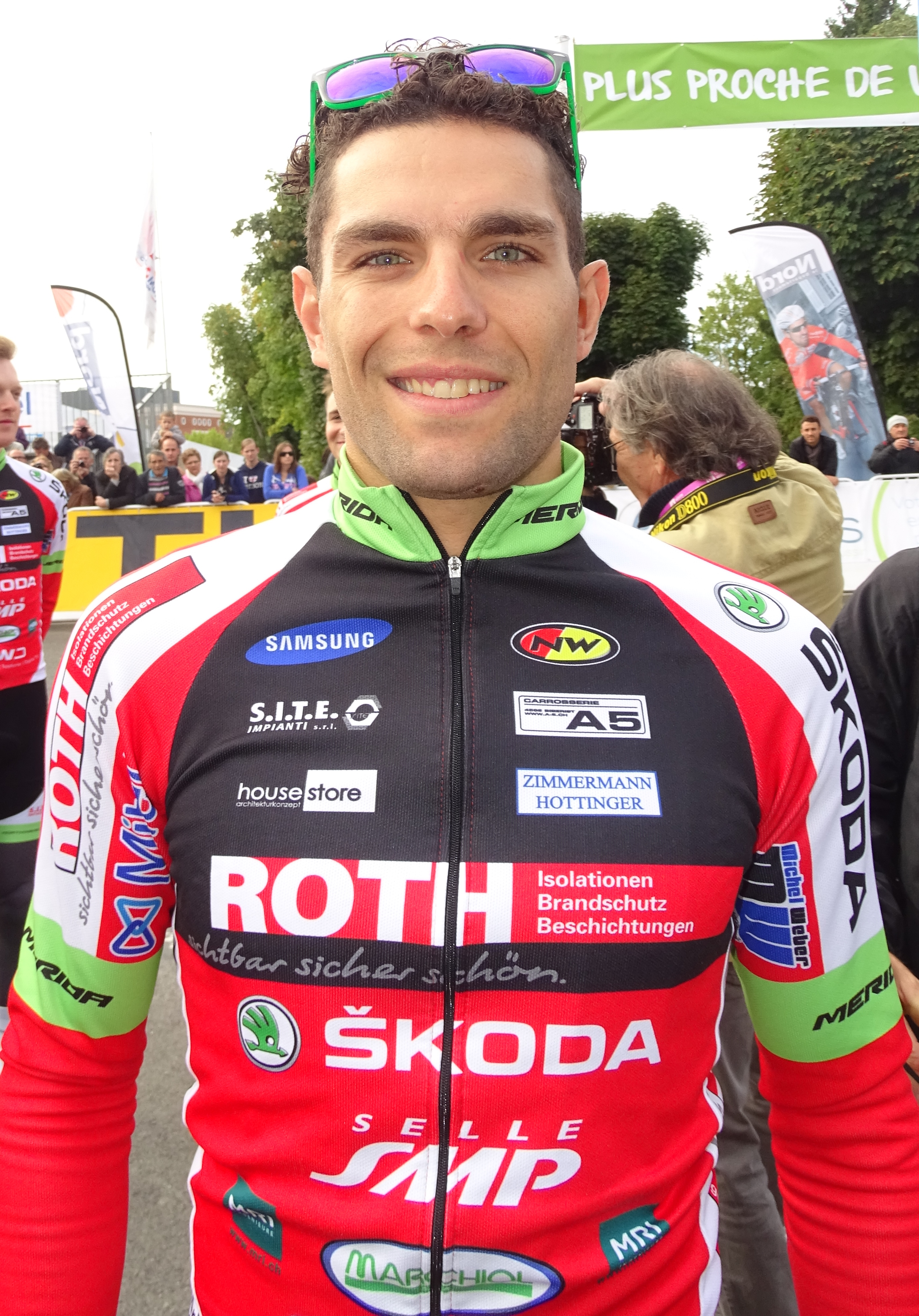
- Pasqualon at the 2015 Grand Prix de Fourmies.

Personal information
- Full name: Andrea Pasqualon
- Born: 2 January 1988 (age 38) Bassano del Grappa, Italy
- Height: 1.74 m (5 ft 9 in)
- Weight: 68 kg (150 lb)

Cycling career
- Sport: Cycling
- Current team: Team Bahrain Victorious
- Discipline: Road
- Role: Rider (retired)
- Rider type: Sprinter

Amateur teams
- 2008: Termopiave Meccanica 2P Cassolato Colori
- 2009–2010: Zalf–Désirée–Fior

Professional teams
- 2010: Lampre–Farnese Vini (stagiaire)
- 2011–2013: Colnago–CSF Inox
- 2014: Area Zero Pro Team
- 2015–2016: Roth–Škoda
- 2017–2020: Wanty–Groupe Gobert
- 2021–2022: Intermarché–Wanty–Gobert Matériaux
- 2023–2025: Team Bahrain Victorious

Major wins
- Stage races Tour de Luxembourg (2018)

Andrea Pasqualon (born 2 January 1988 is a retired Italian cyclist, who last rode for UCI WorldTeam Team Bahrain Victorious. In June 2017, he was named in the startlist for the Tour de France.

== Major results ==
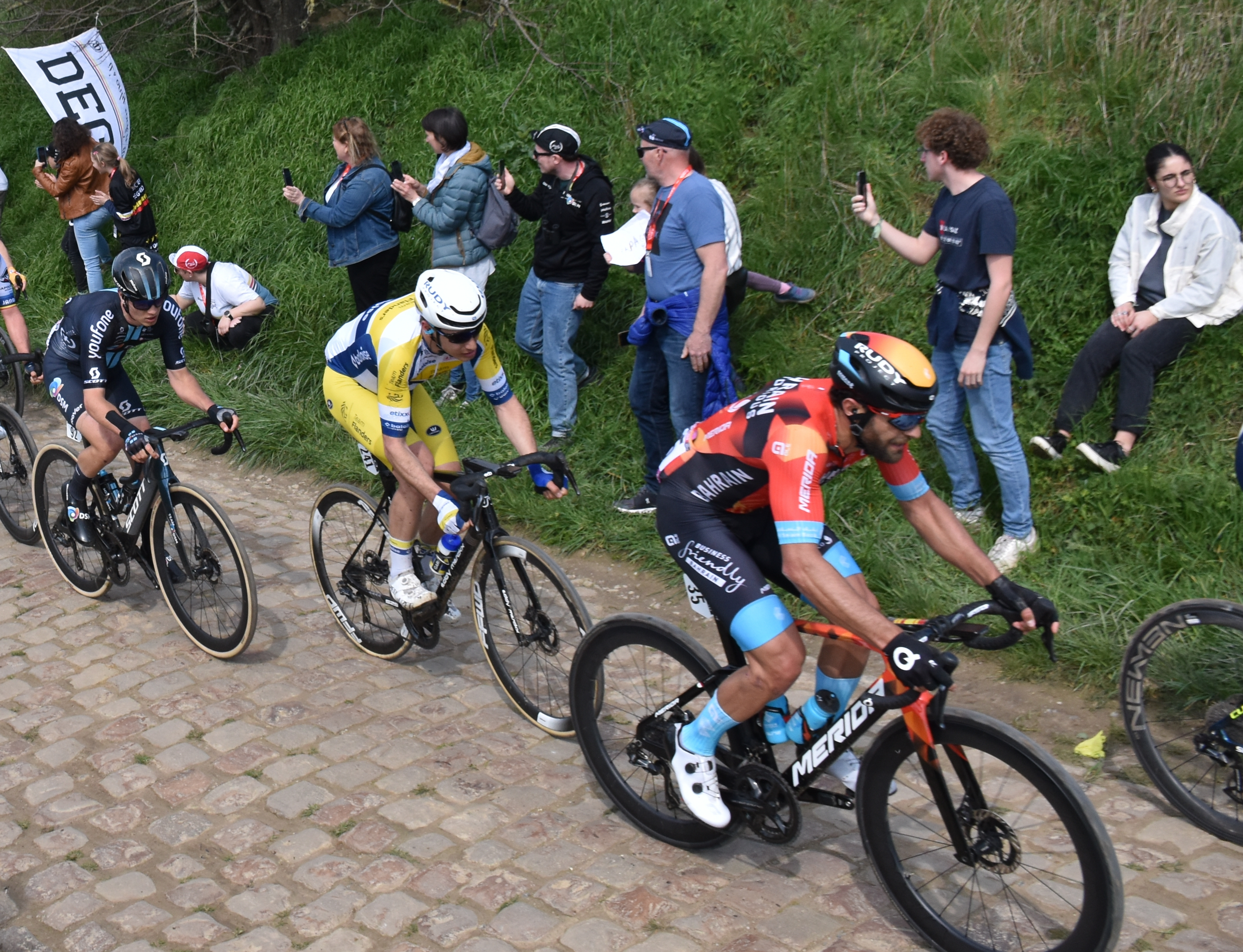
Paris-Roubaix 2023 - Secteur pavé de Quiévy à Saint-Python - N° 35 Andrea Pasqualon.

2009
2nd Trofeo Città di Brescia
6th Coppa San Geo
6th Giro del Medio Brenta
10th Trofeo Alcide Degasperi
2010
1st Trofeo Banca Popolare di Vicenza
1st Giro del Casentino
7th Trofeo Città di Brescia
8th Trofeo Alcide Degasperi
9th Trofeo Franco Balestra
9th Giro del Medio Brenta
2012
4th Trofeo Matteotti
2013
1st Stage 2 Tour du Limousin
2nd Coppa Sabatini
2014
1st Grand Prix Südkärnten
1st Stage 7 Vuelta a Colombia
3rd Gran Premio della Costa Etruschi
3rd Trofeo Laigueglia
5th Giro dell'Appennino
5th Gran Premio Bruno Beghelli
7th Gran Premio Industria e Commercio di Prato
2015
2nd Overall Boucles de la Mayenne

1st Points classification
1st Stage 1

2nd Grand Prix de la ville de Nogent-sur-Oise
2nd Trofeo Matteotti
3rd Tour de Berne
6th Paris–Troyes
6th Ronde van Noord-Holland
6th Coppa Ugo Agostoni
6th Memorial Marco Pantani
7th Overall Tour du Limousin
7th Rund um Köln
10th Overall Oberösterreich Rundfahrt

1st Stage 2

2016
2nd Grand Prix of Aargau Canton
2nd Coppa Sabatini
3rd Race Horizon Park Classic
10th Race Horizon Park Race for Peace
2017
1st Coppa Sabatini
5th Primus Classic
6th Gran Premio Bruno Beghelli
7th Binche–Chimay–Binche
8th Paris–Tours
10th Paris–Bourges
2018
1st Overall Tour de Luxembourg

1st Points classification
1st Stages 2 & 3

1st Grand Prix de Plumelec-Morbihan
4th Grand Prix de Denain
4th Eschborn–Frankfurt
5th Binche–Chimay–Binche
6th Brabantse Pijl
6th Grand Prix of Aargau Canton
6th Boucles de l'Aulne
7th La Drôme Classic
7th Grand Prix de la Ville de Lillers
7th Paris–Bourges
2019
1st Stage 5 Tour Poitou-Charentes en Nouvelle-Aquitaine
2nd Grand Prix of Aargau Canton
3rd Overall Tour de Luxembourg
4th Paris–Bourges
7th Tacx Pro Classic
7th Grand Prix de Plumelec-Morbihan
8th Gran Premio Bruno Beghelli
2020
2nd Coppa Sabatini
3rd Trofeo Playa de Palma
5th Trofeo Campos, Porreres, Felanitx, Ses Salines
5th Memorial Marco Pantani
9th Giro della Toscana
2021
2nd Ronde van Drenthe
3rd Le Samyn
3rd Paris–Chauny
4th Eschborn–Frankfurt
7th La Roue Tourangelle
8th Paris–Tours
8th Grand Prix of Aargau Canton
8th Giro del Veneto
10th Binche–Chimay–Binche
2022
1st Circuit de Wallonie
7th Egmont Cycling Race
8th Omloop Het Nieuwsblad
10th Antwerp Port Epic
10th Schaal Sels
2023
8th Omloop Het Nieuwsblad
8th Dwars door Vlaanderen

=== Grand Tour general classification results timeline ===
Grand Tour	2017	2018	2019	2020	2021	2022	2023	2024	2025
Giro d'Italia	—	—	—	—	72	—	65	81	DNF
Tour de France	137	95	88	—	—	51	—	—	—
Vuelta a España	—	—	—	—	—	—	—	—	—

Legend
—	Did not compete
DNF	Did not finish
IP	In progress
