= 2019 Gran Premio Bruno Beghelli =

2019 UCI Europe Tour

Race details
- Dates: 6 October 2019
- Stages: 1
- Distance: 199.3 km (123.8 mi)
- Winning time: 4h 35' 59"

Results
	Winner	Sonny Colbrelli (ITA)	(Bahrain–Merida)
	Second	Alejandro Valverde (ESP)	(Movistar Team)
	Third	Jack Haig (AUS)	(Mitchelton–Scott)

The 2019 Gran Premio Bruno Beghelli was the 24th edition of the Gran Premio Bruno Beghelli road cycling one day race. It was held on 6 October 2019 as part of the 2019 UCI Europe Tour in category 1.HC, over a distance of 199.3 km, starting and ending in Monteveglio.

The race was won by Sonny Colbrelli of Bahrain–Merida.

== Teams ==
Twenty-five teams were invited to take part in the race. These included eleven UCI WorldTeams, eight UCI Professional Continental teams and six UCI Continental teams.

UCI WorldTeams

- AG2R La Mondiale
- Astana
- Bahrain–Merida
- EF Education First
- Groupama–FDJ
- Movistar Team
- Team Jumbo–Visma
- Mitchelton–Scott
- Trek–Segafredo
- UAE Team Emirates
- Team Ineos

UCI Professional Continental Teams

- Androni Giocattoli–Sidermec
- Arkéa–Samsic
- Bardiani–CSF
- Caja Rural–Seguros RGA
- Gazprom–RusVelo
- Neri Sottoli–Selle Italia–KTM
- Nippo–Vini Fantini–Faizanè
- Wanty–Gobert

UCI Continental Teams

- Amore & Vita–Prodir
- Biesse–Carrera
- Team Beltrami TSA–Hopplà–Petroli Firenze
- Giotti Victoria–Palomar
- Team Colpack
- Sangemini–Trevigiani–MG.K Vis

== Results ==
Result
Rank	Rider	Team	Time
1	Sonny Colbrelli (ITA)	Bahrain–Merida	4h 35' 59"
2	Alejandro Valverde (ESP)	Movistar Team	+ 0"
3	Jack Haig (AUS)	Mitchelton–Scott	+ 0"
4	David Gaudu (FRA)	Groupama–FDJ	+ 0"
5	Bauke Mollema (NED)	Trek–Segafredo	+ 0"
6	Guillaume Martin (FRA)	Wanty–Gobert	+ 0"
7	Iván García Cortina (ESP)	Bahrain–Merida	+ 5"
8	Andrea Pasqualon (ITA)	Wanty–Gobert	+ 7"
9	Sep Vanmarcke (BEL)	EF Education First	+ 7"
10	Jon Aberasturi (ESP)	Caja Rural–Seguros RGA	+ 7"
