= Camous =

Commune in Haute-Pyrénées, France

- Part of Beyrède-Jumet-Camous
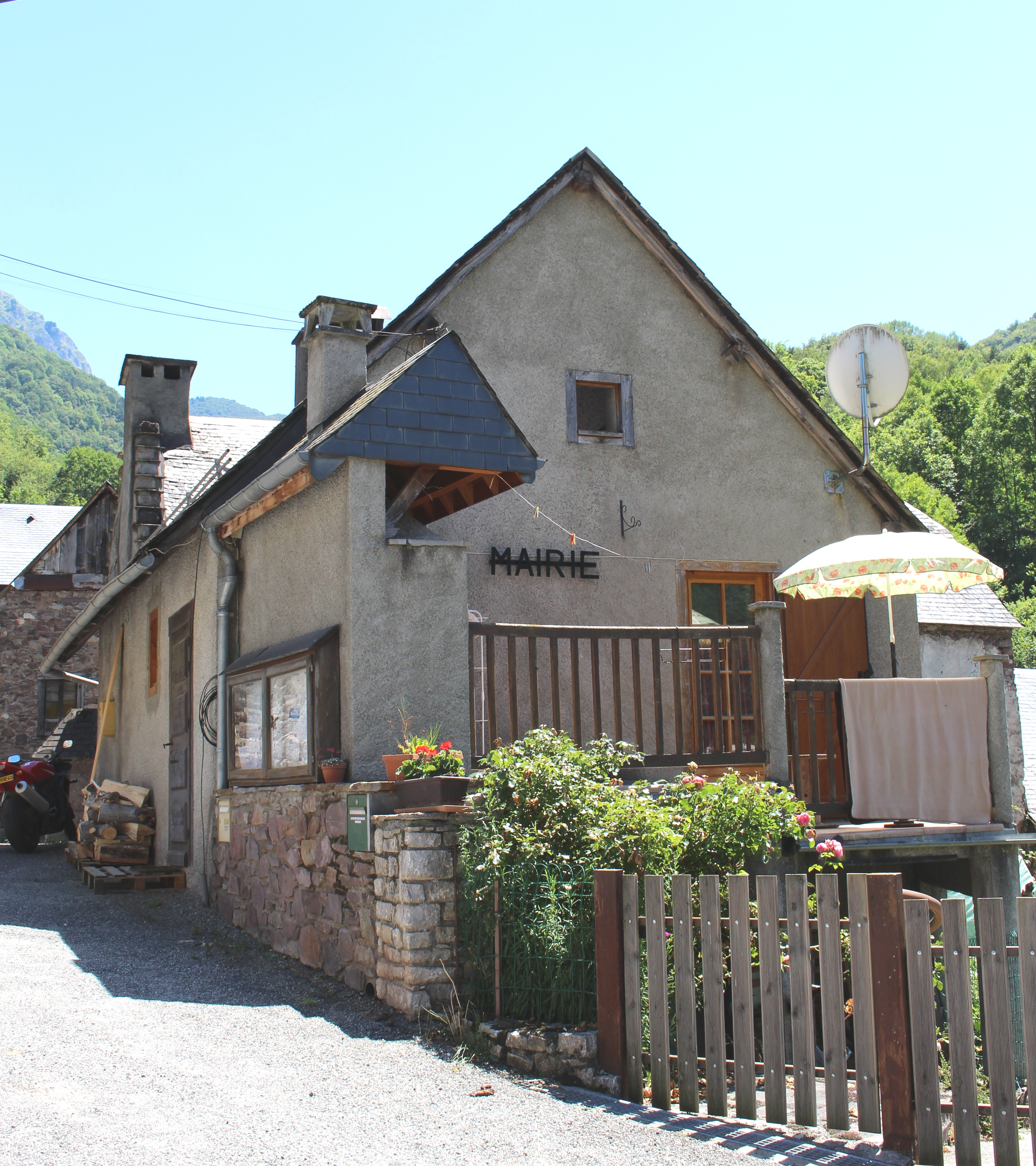
- View of town hall Mairie de Beyrède-Jumet-Camous

- Coat of arms
- Location of Camous
- Location within France Location within Occitanie
- Coordinates: 42°56′45″N 0°22′35″E
- Country: France
- Region: Occitania
- Department: Hautes-Pyrénées
- Arrondissement: Bagnères-de-Bigorre
- Canton: Neste, Aure et Louron
- Commune: Beyrède-Jumet-Camous
- Area^{1}: 3.29 km^{2} (1.27 sq mi)
- Highest elevation: 1,605 m (5,266 ft)
- Lowest elevation: 640 m (2,100 ft)
- Population (2022): 32
  - Density: 9.7/km^{2} (25/sq mi)
- Time zone: UTC+01:00 (CET)
  - Summer (DST): UTC+02:00 (CEST)
- Postal code: 65410
- ^{1} French Land Register data, which excludes lakes, ponds, glaciers > 1 km^{2} (0.386 sq mi or 247 acres) and river estuaries.

Camous (Gascon: Camors) is a former commune in the Hautes-Pyrénées department in south-western France. On 1 January 2019, it was merged into the new commune Beyrède-Jumet-Camous.

== See also ==
- Communes of the Hautes-Pyrénées department
