= Sonny Colbrelli =

Italian road racing cyclist

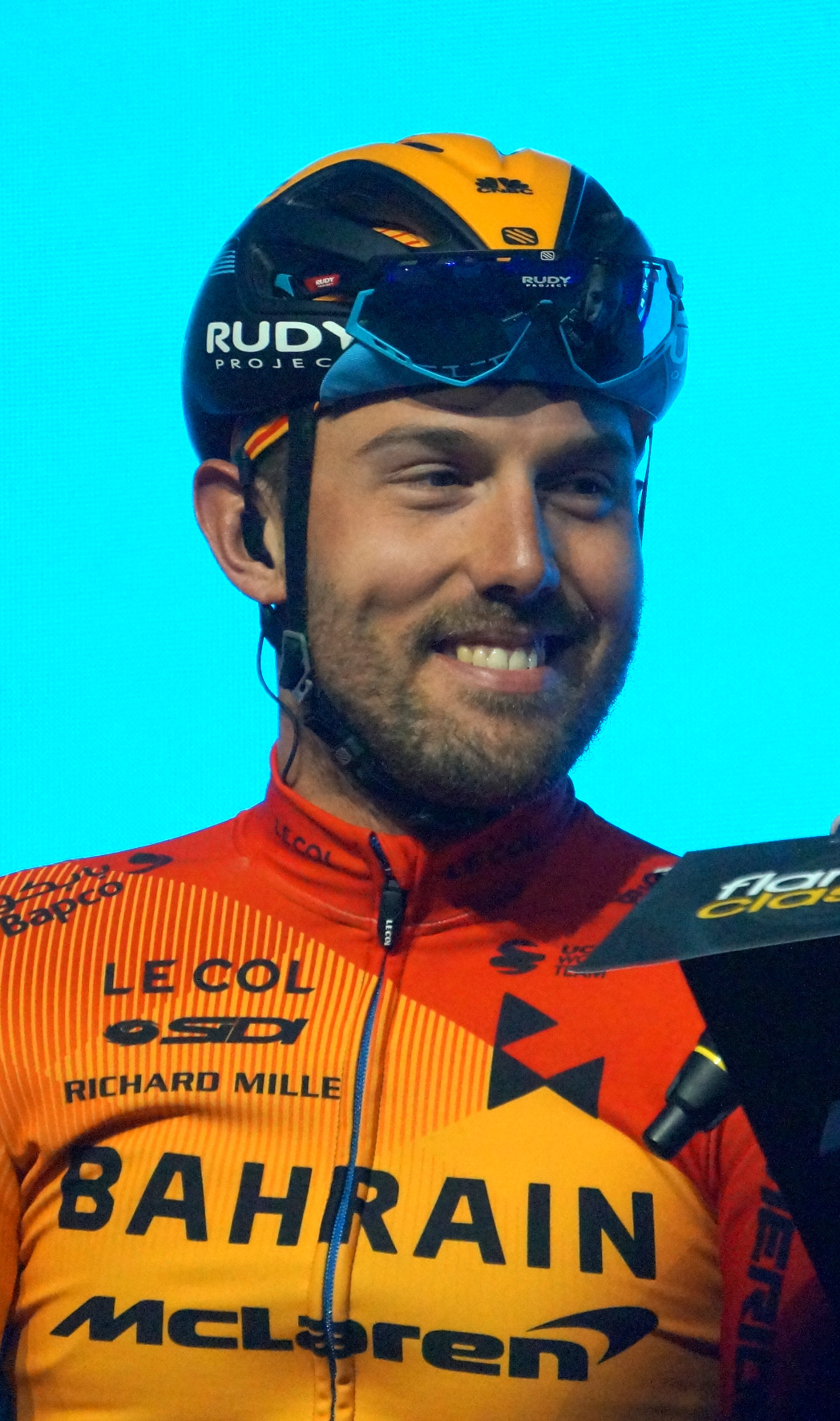
- Colbrelli in 2020

Personal information
- Full name: Sonny Colbrelli
- Nickname: Cobra
- Born: 17 May 1990 (age 36) Desenzano del Garda, Italy
- Height: 1.76 m (5 ft 9 1/2 in)
- Weight: 74 kg (163 lb; 11 st 9 lb)

Cycling career
- Sport: Cycling
- Current team: Retired
- Discipline: Road
- Role: Rider
- Rider type: Sprinter; Classics specialist

Amateur teams
- 2009–2011: Zalf–Désirée–Fior
- 2010: → Colnago–CSF Inox (stagiaire)
- 2011: → Colnago–CSF Inox (stagiaire)

Professional teams
- 2012–2016: Colnago–CSF Bardiani
- 2017–2022: Bahrain–Merida

Major wins
- Stage races Benelux Tour (2021) One-day races and Classics European Road Race Championships (2021) National Road Race Championships (2021) Paris–Roubaix (2021) Gran Premio Bruno Beghelli (2015, 2019) Gran Piemonte (2018) Brabantse Pijl (2017) Gran Premio di Lugano (2016) Tre Valli Varesine (2016)
Medal record
Representing Italy
Men's road bicycle racing
European Championships
Gold medal – first place	2021 Trento	Road race

Sonny Colbrelli (born 17 May 1990) is an Italian former road bicycle racer, who competed as a professional from 2012 to 2022.

== Career ==
Born in Desenzano del Garda, Colbrelli has competed as a professional since the start of the 2012 season, joining Colnago–CSF Bardiani as a neo-pro, from the Zalf–Désirée–Fior amateur squad. Colbrelli had previously competed for the team in two stagiaire spells at the end of the 2010 and 2011 seasons.

Colbrelli made his Grand Tour début at the 2012 Giro d'Italia, where he was earmarked as a lead-out man for the team's sprinter, Sacha Modolo; Colbrelli took his first top ten placing on stage 13, when he finished ninth having led out Modolo to a fourth-place finish.

=== Bahrain–Merida (2017–2022) ===
On 12 April 2017, Colbrelli won Brabantse Pijl, riding for Bahrain–Merida. In June 2017, he was named in the startlist for the Tour de France.

==== 2021 season ====
After three top-ten finishes in one-day races during the opening quarter of the year, Colbrelli took stage victories at the Tour de Romandie and the Critérium du Dauphiné, winning the points classification at both races. He then won the Italian National Road Race Championships for the first time, outsprinting Fausto Masnada, after both riders attacked on the final lap of a hilly course in and around Imola. He took three top-five stage finishes at the Tour de France, as he finished third in the points classification, behind Mark Cavendish and Michael Matthews. He next started at the Benelux Tour, where he won the sixth stage after a 25-kilometre (16-mile) solo attack into Houffalize. Assuming the race leader's blue jersey for the final stage, which included three ascents of the Muur van Geraardsbergen, Colbrelli finished second on the stage behind teammate Matej Mohorič, but Mohorič did not gain enough time to take the overall victory.

The following weekend, Colbrelli formed part of an eight-man Italian team for the road race at the UEC European Road Championships, held in Trento. On the third of eight laps of a 13-kilometre (8.1-mile) finishing circuit, Colbrelli joined compatriot Matteo Trentin as part of a ten-rider lead group; he, and France's Benoît Cosnefroy, later followed an attack by Belgium's Remco Evenepoel on the penultimate lap. Once Cosnefroy was dropped, Colbrelli tactically sat on Evenepoel's wheel and refused to relay with him; at the finish, Colbrelli led into the final corner and pulled clear of Evenepoel to win the gold medal. Ahead of the UCI Road World Championships, Colbrelli finished second to Michael Valgren at the Coppa Sabatini, and he won the Memorial Marco Pantani.

As one of the leaders for the Italian team at the World Championships, Colbrelli was unable to follow the attacks in the closing laps, and ultimately finished tenth in the road race. Colbrelli's next start came at Paris–Roubaix, which had been delayed from April to October due to the COVID-19 pandemic in France, and was held in wet conditions that made some of the cobbled sectors muddy and slippery. Colbrelli attacked several times with around 85–95 kilometres (53–59 miles) remaining, before forming a group with Mathieu van der Poel and Guillaume Boivin. This trio later caught Florian Vermeersch and Tom Van Asbroeck from the original breakaway, leaving just Gianni Moscon clear with 30 kilometres (19 miles) remaining. Moscon suffered a mechanical and a crash in the next few kilometres, which ultimately led to him being caught on the Carrefour de l'Arbre cobbled sector by Colbrelli, van der Poel and Vermeersch. Once Moscon was dropped, the remaining trio contested the sprint at Roubaix Velodrome. As the finish approached the three mud-covered riders slowed to almost half speed and watched one another; Vermeersch was first to launch the sprint, however Colbrelli went round the outside of him in the closing metres to take the victory. Upon crossing the line he came to a stop, hoisted his bike in the air like a trophy, collapsed and wept as van der Poel, who finished 3rd, collapsed on the infield grass. As a result, Colbrelli became the first Italian rider to win the race since Andrea Tafi in 1999, and the third rider to win in his first start in the race.

==== 2022 season ====
Colbrelli began his season by finishing second in the Omloop Het Nieuwsblad. However, he was forced to withdraw from Paris–Nice after suffering from bronchitis, which also prevented him from competing in Milan–San Remo.

===== Cardiac arrest =====
He made his return to racing at the Volta a Catalunya on 21 March 2022 (two days after Milan–San Remo), sprinting to second place on the opening stage. However, after the stage, he collapsed, fell unconscious, and required emergency medical treatment before being transferred to Josep Trueta Hospital in a conscious and stable condition for further assessments. It was later revealed that Colbrelli suffered a cardiac arrhythmia that led to cardiac arrest and had paused his training and competition to recover.

On 1 April 2022, Colbrelli received a subcutaneous implantable defibrillator (ICD) to reset his heart rhythm in case he suffers another cardiac arrest, thus making him unfit to participate in high intensity, competitive sports due to Italian Cardiological Guidelines for Competitive Sports Eligibility for athletes with heart disease (COCIS). As a result of his hiatus, Colbrelli was unable to defend his Paris-Roubaix title.

The incident drew comparisons to Christian Eriksen, a professional footballer who also suffered cardiac arrest and collapsed during physical activity.

In October 2022, Colbrelli announced his retirement from the sport due to heart problems.

== Major results ==
2008
2nd Trofeo Città di Ivrea
3rd Trofeo Emilio Paganessi
2009
2nd Giro del Veneto
2010
1st Trofeo Alcide Degasperi
6th Road race, UCI Under-23 Road World Championships
7th Circuito del Porto
2011
2nd Trofeo Zsšdi
2nd Trofeo Banca Popolare di Vicenza
3rd Trofeo Franco Balestra
3rd Gran Premio della Liberazione
10th Overall Coupe des nations Ville Saguenay
2012
1st Stage 1b (TTT) Giro di Padania
2nd Coppa Bernocchi
9th Gran Premio Bruno Beghelli
2013
2nd Volta Limburg Classic
2nd Tour of Almaty
5th Gran Premio Bruno Beghelli
7th Ronde van Drenthe
8th Gran Premio Industria e Commercio di Prato
2014 (5 pro wins)
1st Overall Italian Cup
1st Giro dell'Appennino
1st Memorial Marco Pantani
1st Gran Premio Industria e Commercio di Prato
1st Coppa Sabatini
1st Stage 2 Tour of Slovenia
2nd Gran Premio di Lugano
2nd Volta Limburg Classic
2nd Tre Valli Varesine
3rd Roma Maxima
4th Trofeo Laigueglia
5th Gran Premio Città di Camaiore
5th Grand Prix Pino Cerami
6th Milan–San Remo
2015 (3)
1st Overall Italian Cup
1st Overall Tour du Limousin

1st Young rider classification
1st Stage 1

1st Gran Premio Bruno Beghelli
3rd Gran Piemonte
5th Gran Premio della Costa Etruschi
5th Coppa Ugo Agostoni
6th Gran Premio Industria e Commercio di Prato
6th Coppa Sabatini
10th Coppa Bernocchi
2016 (7)
1st Overall Italian Cup
1st Gran Premio di Lugano
1st Coppa Ugo Agostoni
1st Coppa Sabatini
1st Tre Valli Varesine
1st Stage 5 Tour du Poitou-Charentes
2nd Overall Tour du Limousin

1st Stages 3 & 4

2nd Overall Giro di Toscana
2nd Trofeo Laigueglia
2nd Volta Limburg Classic
3rd Amstel Gold Race
4th Gran Premio Bruno Beghelli
5th Gran Piemonte
6th Brabantse Pijl
9th Milan–San Remo
2017 (3)
1st Brabantse Pijl
1st Coppa Bernocchi
1st Stage 2 Paris–Nice
2nd Coppa Sabatini
2nd Gran Premio Bruno Beghelli
3rd Bretagne Classic
5th Memorial Marco Pantani
7th E3 Harelbeke
9th Amstel Gold Race
10th Tour of Flanders
10th Grand Prix Cycliste de Québec
2018 (4)
1st Gran Piemonte
1st Coppa Bernocchi
1st Stage 3 Tour de Suisse
1st Stage 1 (TTT) Hammer Sportzone Limburg
2nd Grand Prix Cycliste de Montréal
2nd Brabantse Pijl
2nd Coppa Sabatini
3rd Overall Dubai Tour

1st Stage 4

3rd Kuurne–Brussels–Kuurne
8th Omloop Het Nieuwsblad
9th Milan–San Remo
2019 (3)
1st Gran Premio Bruno Beghelli
1st Stage 4 Tour of Oman
2nd Road race, National Road Championships
2nd Overall Deutschland Tour

1st Points classification
1st Stage 4

2nd Coppa Sabatini
5th Memorial Marco Pantani
8th Trofeo Matteotti
9th EuroEyes Cyclassics
2020 (1)
1st Stage 2 Route d'Occitanie
3rd Road race, National Road Championships
4th Brabantse Pijl
6th Overall BinckBank Tour
7th Kuurne–Brussels–Kuurne
2021 (8)
1st Road race, UEC European Road Championships
1st Road race, National Road Championships
1st Overall Benelux Tour

1st Stage 6

1st Overall Italian Cup
1st Paris–Roubaix
1st Memorial Marco Pantani
Tour de Romandie

1st Points classification
1st Stage 2

Critérium du Dauphiné

1st Points classification
1st Stage 3

2nd Coppa Sabatini
4th Gent–Wevelgem
6th Kuurne–Brussels–Kuurne
8th Milan–San Remo
10th Road race, UCI Road World Championships
2022
2nd Omloop Het Nieuwsblad

=== Grand Tour general classification results timeline ===
Grand Tour	2012	2013	2014	2015	2016	2017	2018	2019	2020	2021
Giro d'Italia	100	89	94	100	95	—	—	—	—	—
Tour de France	—	—	—	—	—	122	109	85	93	52
Vuelta a España	Did not contest during his career									

=== Classics results timeline ===
Monument	2012	2013	2014	2015	2016	2017	2018	2019	2020	2021	2022
Milan–San Remo	—	12	6	18	9	13	9	43	63	8	—
Tour of Flanders	—	—	—	—	—	10	23	30	47	55	—
Paris–Roubaix	—	—	—	—	—	—	—	—	NH	1	—
Liège–Bastogne–Liège	Did not contest during his career										
Giro di Lombardia	DNF	—	—	DNF	DNF	—	—	—	—	—	—
Classic	2012	2013	2014	2015	2016	2017	2018	2019	2020	2021	2022
Omloop Het Nieuwsblad	—	—	—	—	—	35	8	38	50	DNF	2
Kuurne–Brussels–Kuurne	—	NH	—	—	—	52	3	DNF	7	6	75
E3 Harelbeke	—	—	—	—	—	7	49	13	NH	57	—
Gent–Wevelgem	—	—	—	—	DNF	13	124	DNF	DNF	4	—
Brabantse Pijl	—	—	DNF	DNF	6	1	2	49	4	64	—
Amstel Gold Race	—	—	DNF	107	3	9	74	72	NH	72	—
Hamburg Cyclassics	—	—	—	—	—	85	67	9	Not held		—
Bretagne Classic	—	—	72	—	43	3	20	—	—	—	—
Grand Prix Cycliste de Québec	—	—	—	—	—	10	115	37	Not held		—
Grand Prix Cycliste de Montréal	—	—	—	—	—	19	2	DNF	Not held		—

=== Major championships timeline ===
Event		2014	2015	2016	2017	2018	2019	2020	2021
World Championships	Road race	13	—	DNF	59	—	11	—	10
European Championships	Road race	Did not exist		29	—	14	—	—	1
National Championships	Road race	DNF	DNF	—	8	66	2	3	1

Legend
—	Did not compete
DNF	Did not finish
NH	Not held
