= 2017 Gran Premio Bruno Beghelli =

2017 UCI Europe Tour

Race details
- Dates: 1 October 2017
- Stages: 1
- Distance: 198.9 km (123.6 mi)
- Winning time: 4h 27' 30"

Results
	Winner	Luis León Sánchez (ESP)
	Second	Sonny Colbrelli (ITA)
	Third	Elia Viviani (ITA)

The 2017 Gran Premio Bruno Beghelli was the 22nd edition of the Gran Premio Bruno Beghelli road cycling one day race. It was held on 1 October 2017 as part of UCI Europe Tour in category 1.HC.

== Teams ==
Twenty-four teams of up to eight riders started the race:

UCI WorldTeams

- FDJ
- Bahrain–Merida
- Team Dimension Data
- Cannondale–Drapac
- Astana
- Team Sky
- UAE Team Emirates
- Trek–Segafredo
- AG2R La Mondiale
- Orica–Scott

UCI Professional Continental teams

- Bardiani–CSF
- Cofidis
- Gazprom–RusVelo
- CCC–Sprandi–Polkowice
- Israel Cycling Academy
- Wanty–Groupe Gobert
- Wilier Triestina–Selle Italia
- Nippo–Vini Fantini
- Caja Rural–Seguros RGA
- Androni–Sidermec–Bottecchia

UCI Continental teams

- Sangemini–MG.K Vis
- GM Europa Ovini
- Amore & Vita–Selle SMP
- Unieuro Trevigiani–Hemus 1896

== Result ==
Final general classification

Rank	Rider	Team	Time
1	Luis León Sánchez (ESP)	Astana	4h 27' 30"
2	Sonny Colbrelli (ITA)	Bahrain–Merida	+ 6"
3	Elia Viviani (ITA)	Team Sky	s.t.
4	Michael Albasini (SUI)	Orica–Scott	s.t.
5	Alberto Bettiol (ITA)	Cannondale–Drapac	s.t.
6	Andrea Pasqualon (ITA)	Wanty–Groupe Gobert	s.t.
7	Marco Canola (ITA)	Nippo–Vini Fantini	s.t.
8	Julien Simon (FRA)	Cofidis	s.t.
9	Simone Consonni (ITA)	UAE Team Emirates	s.t.
10	Magnus Cort (DEN)	Orica–Scott	s.t.
