= 2017 Brabantse Pijl =

2017 UCI Europe Tour
- Event poster with previous winner Petr Vakoč

Race details
- Dates: 12 April 2017
- Stages: 1
- Distance: 197 km (122 mi)
- Winning time: 4h 44' 22"

Results
	Winner	Sonny Colbrelli (ITA)	(Bahrain–Merida)
	Second	Petr Vakoč (CZE)	(Quick-Step Floors)
	Third	Tiesj Benoot (BEL)	(Lotto–Soudal)

The 2017 Brabantse Pijl was a one-day road cycling race that took place on 12 April 2017. It was the 57th edition of the Brabantse Pijl and was rated as a 1.HC event as part of the 2017 UCI Europe Tour.

Italian Sonny Colbrelli (Bahrain–Merida) won the race in a sprint ahead of previous victor Petr Vakoč of Quick-Step Floors.

== Teams ==
Twenty-four teams were invited to take part in the race. These included nine UCI WorldTeams and fifteen UCI Continental Circuits#UCI Professional Continental teams.

UCI WorldTeams

- Bahrain–Merida
- BMC Racing Team
- Cannondale–Drapac
- Team Dimension Data
- Lotto–Soudal
- LottoNL–Jumbo
- Orica–Scott
- Quick-Step Floors
- Team Sunweb

UCI Professional Continental Teams

- Aqua Blue Sport
- Bardiani–CSF
- CCC–Sprandi–Polkowice
- Cofidis
- Direct Énergie
- Gazprom–RusVelo
- Israel Cycling Academy
- Team Manzana Postobón
- Team Novo Nordisk
- Roompot–Nederlandse Loterij
- Sport Vlaanderen–Baloise
- Vérandas Willems–Crelan
- Wanty–Groupe Gobert
- WB Veranclassic Aqua Protect
- Fortuneo–Vital Concept

== Result ==
Result
Rank	Rider	Team	Time
1	Sonny Colbrelli (ITA)	Bahrain–Merida	4h 44' 22"
2	Petr Vakoč (CZE)	Quick-Step Floors	+ 0"
3	Tiesj Benoot (BEL)	Lotto–Soudal	+ 0"
4	Tim Wellens (BEL)	Lotto–Soudal	+ 0"
5	Bert-Jan Lindeman (NED)	LottoNL–Jumbo	+ 0"
6	Christopher Juul-Jensen (DEN)	Orica–Scott	+ 0"
7	Dries Devenyns (BEL)	Quick-Step Floors	+ 0"
8	Silvan Dillier (SUI)	BMC Racing Team	+ 0"
9	Victor Campenaerts (BEL)	LottoNL–Jumbo	+ 6"
10	Laurens De Plus (BEL)	Quick-Step Floors	+ 6"
