= 2013 Volta Limburg Classic =

2013 Hel van het Mergelland
Race details
- Dates: 30 March 2013
- Stages: 1
- Distance: 196 km (121.8 mi)
- Winning time: 4h 55' 46"

Results
	Winner	Rüdiger Selig (GER)
	Second	Sonny Colbrelli (ITA)
	Third	Paul Martens (GER)

The 2013 Volta Limburg Classic was the 40th edition of the Volta Limburg Classic cycle race and was held on 30 March 2013. The race started and finished in Eijsden. The race was won by Rüdiger Selig.

== General classification ==
Final general classification

Rank	Rider	Time
1	Rüdiger Selig (GER)	4h 55' 46"
2	Sonny Colbrelli (ITA)	+ 0"
3	Paul Martens (GER)	+ 0"
4	Davide Rebellin (ITA)	+ 0"
5	Pim Ligthart (NED)	+ 0"
6	Sander Armée (BEL)	+ 4"
7	Mike Terpstra (NED)	+ 4"
8	Marc de Maar (CUR)	+ 4"
9	Luc Hagenaars (NED)	+ 4"
10	Sébastien Delfosse (BEL)	+ 4"
