= Beyrède-Jumet-Camous =

- Commune
- Location of Beyrède-Jumet-Camous
- Location within France Location within Occitanie
- Coordinates: 42°57′32″N 0°22′36″E
- Country: France
- Region: Occitania
- Department: Hautes-Pyrénées
- Arrondissement: Bagnères-de-Bigorre
- Canton: Neste, Aure et Louron
- Intercommunality: Aure-Louron
- Area^{1}: 19.19 km^{2} (7.41 sq mi)
- Highest elevation: 1,924 m (6,312 ft)
- Lowest elevation: 635 m (2,083 ft)
- Population (2023): 194
  - Density: 10.1/km^{2} (26.2/sq mi)
- Time zone: UTC+01:00 (CET)
  - Summer (DST): UTC+02:00 (CEST)
- INSEE/Postal code: 65092 /65410
- ^{1} French Land Register data, which excludes lakes, ponds, glaciers > 1 km^{2} (0.386 sq mi or 247 acres) and river estuaries.

Beyrède-Jumet-Camours (Occitan: Beirede) is a commune in the Hautes-Pyrénées department in southwestern France. It was established on 1 January 2019 by merger of the former communes of Beyrède-Jumet (the seat) and Camous.

== See also ==
- Communes of the Hautes-Pyrénées department
