= 2021 Paris–Roubaix =

Cycling race

2021 UCI World Tour, race 28 of 29
- Event poster with previous winner Philippe Gilbert

Race details
- Dates: 3 October 2021
- Stages: 1
- Distance: 257.7 km (160.1 mi)
- Winning time: 6h 01' 57"

Results
	Winner	Sonny Colbrelli (ITA)	(Team Bahrain Victorious)
	Second	Florian Vermeersch (BEL)	(Lotto–Soudal)
	Third	Mathieu van der Poel (NED)	(Alpecin–Fenix)

The 2021 Paris–Roubaix was a road cycling one-day race that took place on 3 October 2021 in France. It was the 118th edition of Paris–Roubaix and the 28th event of the 2021 UCI World Tour. The race was won by Italian Sonny Colbrelli in a sprint finish.

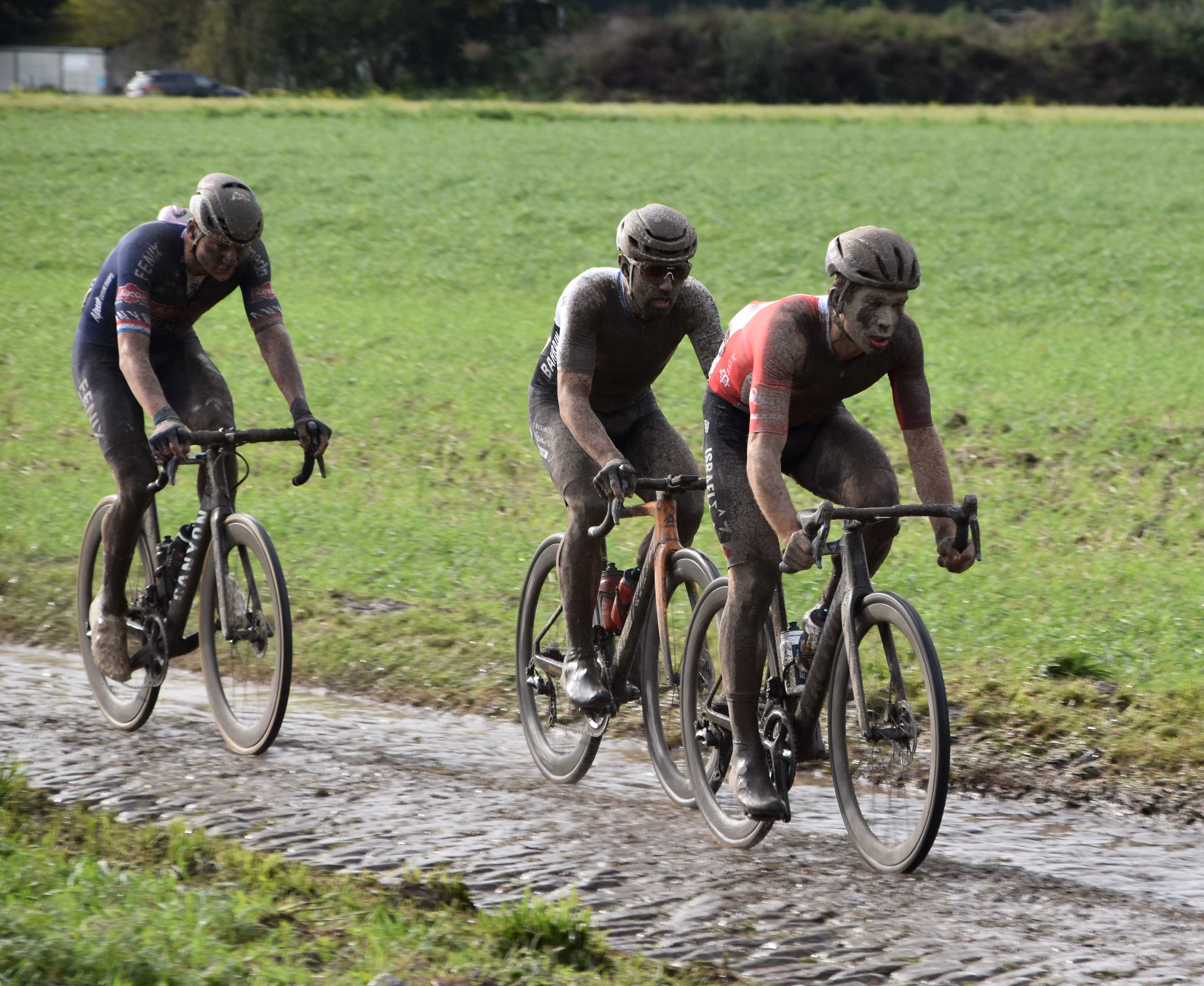
The race was held in wet and rainy conditions, for the first time in nearly 20 years

== Teams ==
All nineteen UCI WorldTeams and six UCI ProTeams participated to the race. Of the twenty-five teams, only Team BikeExchange did not compete with the maximum allowed seven riders. 96 of the 174 riders to start the race finished.

UCI WorldTeams

- AG2R Citroën Team
- Astana–Premier Tech
- Bora–Hansgrohe
- Cofidis
- Deceuninck–Quick-Step
- EF Education–Nippo
- Groupama–FDJ
- Ineos Grenadiers
- Intermarché–Wanty–Gobert Matériaux
- Israel Start-Up Nation
- Lotto–Soudal
- Movistar Team
- Team Bahrain Victorious
- Team BikeExchange
- Team DSM
- Team Jumbo–Visma
- Team Qhubeka NextHash
- Trek–Segafredo
- UAE Team Emirates

UCI ProTeams

- Alpecin–Fenix
- Arkéa–Samsic
- B&B Hotels p/b KTM
- Bingoal Pauwels Sauces WB
- Delko
- Team TotalEnergies

== Summary ==
Originally scheduled to take place on 11 April 2021, the race was postponed due to the COVID-19 pandemic in France. The planned race in 2020 was also cancelled due to the pandemic. For the first time, Paris–Roubaix Femmes was held, taking place the day before the men's race.

Italy's Sonny Colbrelli won the race in a three-man sprint ahead of Florian Vermeersch and Mathieu van der Poel. It was the first time an Italian cyclist had won the race since Andrea Tafi won the 1999 edition. The Paris–Roubaix weekend was wet and rainy, for the first time for nearly 20 years.

== Result ==
Result
Rank	Rider	Team	Time
1	Sonny Colbrelli (ITA)	Team Bahrain Victorious	6h 01' 57"
2	Florian Vermeersch (BEL)	Lotto–Soudal	+ 0"
3	Mathieu van der Poel (NED)	Alpecin–Fenix	+ 0"
4	Gianni Moscon (ITA)	Ineos Grenadiers	+ 44"
5	Yves Lampaert (BEL)	Deceuninck–Quick-Step	+ 1' 16"
6	Christophe Laporte (FRA)	Cofidis	+ 1' 16"
7	Wout van Aert (BEL)	Team Jumbo–Visma	+ 1' 16"
8	Tom Van Asbroeck (BEL)	Israel Start-Up Nation	+ 1' 16"
9	Guillaume Boivin (CAN)	Israel Start-Up Nation	+ 1' 16"
10	Heinrich Haussler (AUS)	Team Bahrain Victorious	+ 1' 16"
