= 2016 Gran Premio Bruno Beghelli =

2016 UCI Europe Tour

Race details
- Dates: 25 September 2016
- Stages: 1
- Distance: 200.4 km (124.5 mi)
- Winning time: 4h 25' 21"

Results
	Winner	Nicola Ruffoni (ITA)
	Second	Filippo Pozzato (ITA)
	Third	Jens Keukeleire (BEL)

The 2016 Gran Premio Bruno Beghelli was the 21st edition of the Gran Premio Bruno Beghelli road cycling one day race. It was held on 25 September 2016 as part of UCI Europe Tour in category 1.HC.

== Teams ==
Twenty-five teams of up to eight riders started the race:

UCI WorldTeams

- FDJ
- Lampre–Merida
- BMC Racing Team
- Trek–Segafredo
- Team Dimension Data
- Astana
- Movistar Team
- AG2R La Mondiale
- Cannondale–Drapac
- Orica–BikeExchange

UCI Professional Continental teams

- Bardiani–CSF
- Nippo–Vini Fantini
- Caja Rural–Seguros RGA
- Androni Giocattoli–Sidermec
- Delko–Marseille Provence KTM
- Fortuneo–Vital Concept
- Wanty–Groupe Gobert
- Cofidis
- Topsport Vlaanderen–Baloise
- Gazprom–RusVelo
- Bora–Argon 18
- CCC–Sprandi–Polkowice
- Wilier Triestina–Southeast

UCI Continental team

- GM Europa Ovini

National team

- Italy

== Result ==
Final general classification

Rank	Rider	Team	Time
1	Nicola Ruffoni (ITA)	Bardiani–CSF	4h 25' 21"
2	Filippo Pozzato (ITA)	Wilier Triestina–Southeast	s.t.
3	Jens Keukeleire (BEL)	Orica–BikeExchange	s.t.
4	Sonny Colbrelli (ITA)	Bardiani–CSF	s.t.
5	Simone Consonni (ITA)	Italy	s.t.
6	Jacopo Guarnieri (ITA)	Italy	s.t.
7	Danilo Napolitano (ITA)	Wanty–Groupe Gobert	s.t.
8	Kristian Sbaragli (ITA)	Team Dimension Data	s.t.
9	Magnus Cort (DEN)	Orica–BikeExchange	s.t.
10	Francesco Gavazzi (ITA)	Androni Giocattoli–Sidermec	s.t.
