= 2022 Omloop Het Nieuwsblad =

Bicycle race

2022 UCI World Tour, race 2 of 32
- Event poster with previous winner Davide Ballerini

Race details
- Dates: 26 February 2022
- Stages: 1
- Distance: 204.2 km (126.9 mi)

Results
	Winner	Wout van Aert (BEL)	(Team Jumbo–Visma)
	Second	Sonny Colbrelli (ITA)	(Team Bahrain Victorious)
	Third	Greg Van Avermaet (BEL)	(AG2R Citroën Team)

The 2022 Omloop Het Nieuwsblad is a road cycling one-day race that took place on 26 February 2022 in Belgium, starting in Gent and finishing in Ninove. It was the 77th edition of the Omloop Het Nieuwsblad and the second event of the 2022 UCI World Tour.

Omloop Het Nieuwsblad is a race that is usually won by a solo rider or is decided by a sprint from a small group of several riders. This year was no exception, winner Wout van Aert attacked with 13 km to go from the group of favorites. Victor Campenaerts was the first to try chase Van Aert down from the group of 20 riders. van Aert held his lead to the line extending the gap to 22 seconds. The group of 20 sprint out for the rest of the places of the podium with Sonny Colbrelli beating Greg Van Avermaet.

== Teams ==
Twenty-five teams participated in the race, including all eighteen UCI WorldTour teams and seven UCI ProTeams. Each team entered seven riders, except for Team BikeExchange–Jayco who entered five, and Movistar Team and Groupama–FDJ who entered six each, for a total of 171 riders.

UCI WorldTeams

- Quick-Step Alpha Vinyl Team
- Team Jumbo–Visma
- Lotto–Soudal
- Intermarché–Wanty–Gobert Matériaux
- AG2R Citroën Team
- Trek–Segafredo
- Astana Qazaqstan Team
- Team Bahrain Victorious
- Bora–Hansgrohe
- Cofidis
- EF Education–EasyPost
- Groupama–FDJ
- Ineos Grenadiers
- Israel–Premier Tech
- Movistar Team
- Team BikeExchange–Jayco
- Team DSM
- UAE Team Emirates

UCI ProTeams

- B&B Hotels–KTM
- Bingoal Pauwels Sauces WB
- Sport Vlaanderen–Baloise
- Arkéa–Samsic
- Team TotalEnergies
- Uno-X Pro Cycling Team
- Alpecin–Fenix

== Result ==
Result
Rank	Rider	Team	Time
1	Wout van Aert (BEL)	Team Jumbo–Visma	4h 50' 46"
2	Sonny Colbrelli (ITA)	Team Bahrain Victorious	+ 22"
3	Greg Van Avermaet (BEL)	AG2R Citroën Team	+ 22"
4	Oliver Naesen (BEL)	AG2R Citroën Team	+ 22"
5	Victor Campenaerts (BEL)	Lotto–Soudal	+ 22"
6	Rasmus Tiller (NOR)	Uno-X Pro Cycling Team	+ 22"
7	Matteo Trentin (ITA)	UAE Team Emirates	+ 22"
8	Andrea Pasqualon (ITA)	Intermarché–Wanty–Gobert Matériaux	+ 22"
9	Florian Sénéchal (FRA)	Quick-Step Alpha Vinyl Team	+ 22"
10	Jasper Stuyven (BEL)	Trek–Segafredo	+ 22"
