= 2010 Grote Prijs Jef Scherens =

Race details
- Dates: 5 September 2010
- Stages: 1
- Distance: 183.3 km (113.9 mi)
- Winning time: 4h 09' 24"

Results
	Winner	Lars Boom (NED)
	Second	Maxime Vantomme (BEL)
	Third	Fabian Wegmann (GER)

The 2010 Grote Prijs Jef Scherens was the 44th edition of the Grote Prijs Jef Scherens cycle race and was held on 5 September 2010. The race started and finished in Leuven. The race was won by Lars Boom.

== General classification ==
Final general classification

Rank	Rider	Time
1	Lars Boom (NED)	4h 09' 24"
2	Maxime Vantomme (BEL)	+ 0"
3	Fabian Wegmann (GER)	+ 0"
4	Björn Leukemans (BEL)	+ 0"
5	Francesco Reda (ITA)	+ 0"
6	Paul Martens (GER)	+ 7"
7	Robbie McEwen (AUS)	+ 18"
8	Alexander Kristoff (NOR)	+ 18"
9	Stefan van Dijk (NED)	+ 18"
10	Aidis Kruopis (LTU)	+ 18"
