= Italian Road Cycling Cup =

Road bicycle racing competition

- Sport: Road bicycle racing
- Founded: 2007
- Country: Italy
- Most recent champion: Filippo Zana
- Most titles: Sonny Colbrelli (4 wins)

The Italian Road Cycling Cup (Italian: Coppa Italia di ciclismo) is a season-long road bicycle racing competition which consists of a number of standalone Italian races.

== History ==
The competition was established in 2007 and is open to all riders who ride with an Italian-licensed team. The current format of the Italian Cycling Cup groups all Italian one-day and stages races of HC and first category, i.e. all races just below UCI World Tour level. Since 2016 the competition also includes the time trial and road race of the Italian national championships.

In each race, the top 20 riders score points and the rider scoring the most points in total is crowned the Italian Cycling Cup champion. Separate classifications are held for the best young rider and the best team. The winning team used to receive a wildcard invitation for the Giro d'Italia the following season.

== Winners ==
Year	Winner	Team competition
2007	Alessandro Bertolini (ITA)	Tenax–Menikini
2008	Danilo Di Luca (ITA)	Diquigiovanni–Androni
2009	Giovanni Visconti (ITA)	CSF Group–Navigare
2010		Androni Giocattoli
2011		Androni Giocattoli
2012		Androni Giocattoli–Venezuela
2013	Diego Ulissi (ITA)	Lampre–Merida
2014	Sonny Colbrelli (ITA)	Neri Sottoli
2015	Sonny Colbrelli (ITA)	Southeast Pro Cycling
2016	Sonny Colbrelli (ITA)	Bardiani–CSF
2017	Diego Ulissi (ITA)	Androni–Sidermec–Bottecchia
2018	Domenico Pozzovivo (ITA)	Androni Giocattoli–Sidermec
2019	Giovanni Visconti (ITA)	Androni Giocattoli–Sidermec
2020	Diego Ulissi (ITA)	UAE Team Emirates
2021	Sonny Colbrelli (ITA)	Team Bahrain Victorious
2022	Filippo Zana (ITA)	UAE Team Emirates

== See also ==
- Belgian Road Cycling Cup
- French Road Cycling Cup
- Premier Calendar
