= 2012 Vuelta a Burgos =

Race details
- Dates: 1–5 August 2012
- Stages: 5
- Distance: 775 km (481.6 mi)
- Winning time: 18h 14' 12"

Results
	Winner	Daniel Moreno (ESP)	(Team Katusha)
	Second	Sergio Henao (COL)	(Team Sky)
	Third	Esteban Chaves (COL)	(Colombia–Coldeportes)

The 2012 Vuelta a Burgos was the 34th edition of the Vuelta a Burgos road cycling stage race, which was held from 1 August to 5 August 2012. The race started in Miranda de Ebro and finished at Lagunas de Neila. The race was won by Daniel Moreno of Team Katusha.

== General classification ==
Final general classification

Rank	Rider	Team	Time
1	Daniel Moreno (ESP)	Team Katusha	18h 14' 12"
2	Sergio Henao (COL)	Team Sky	+ 10"
3	Esteban Chaves (COL)	Colombia–Coldeportes	+ 16"
4	Franco Pellizotti (ITA)	Androni Giocattoli–Venezuela	+ 50"
5	Javier Moreno (ESP)	Movistar Team	+ 58"
6	Robert Gesink (NED)	Rabobank	+ 1' 03"
7	Giovanni Visconti (ITA)	Movistar Team	+ 1' 09"
8	Eros Capecchi (ITA)	Liquigas–Cannondale	+ 1' 28"
9	Igor Antón (ESP)	Euskaltel–Euskadi	+ 1' 29"
10	Tom Dumoulin (NED)	Argos–Shimano	+ 1' 43"
