= Cazouls-lès-Béziers =

- Commune
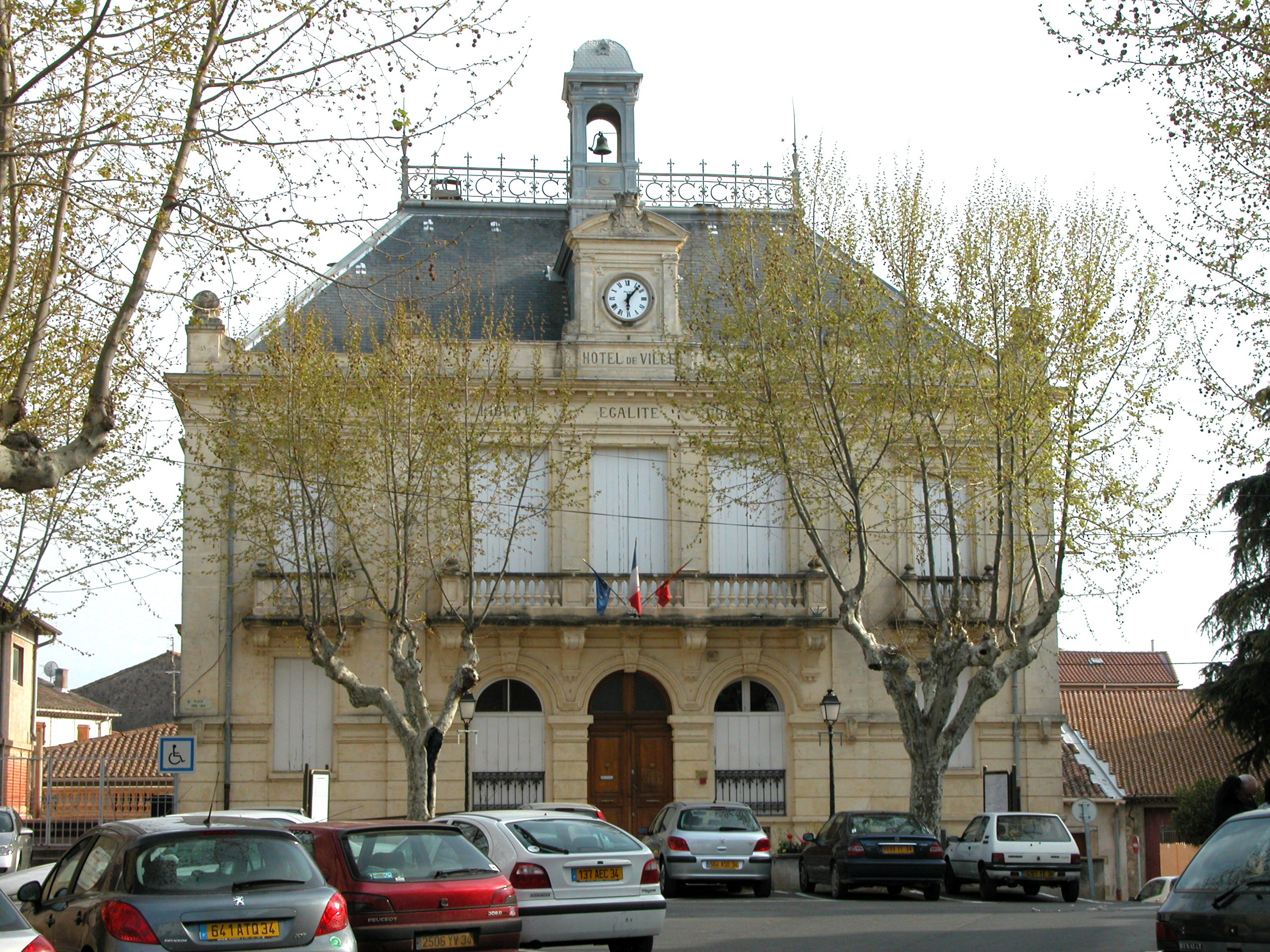
- Town hall

- Coat of arms
- Location of Cazouls-lès-Béziers
- Location within France Location within Occitanie
- Coordinates: 43°23′36″N 3°06′08″E
- Country: France
- Region: Occitania
- Department: Hérault
- Arrondissement: Béziers
- Canton: Cazouls-lès-Béziers
- Intercommunality: Domitienne

Government
  - Mayor (2020–2026): Philippe Vidal
- Area^{1}: 38.46 km^{2} (14.85 sq mi)
- Highest elevation: 204 m (669 ft)
- Lowest elevation: 16 m (52 ft)
- Population (2023): 5,261
  - Density: 136.8/km^{2} (354.3/sq mi)
- Time zone: UTC+01:00 (CET)
  - Summer (DST): UTC+02:00 (CEST)
- INSEE/Postal code: 34069 /34370
- ^{1} French Land Register data, which excludes lakes, ponds, glaciers > 1 km^{2} (0.386 sq mi or 247 acres) and river estuaries.

Cazouls-lès-Béziers (French pronunciation: [kazul lɛ bezje], literally Cazouls near Béziers; Languedocien: Càsols de Besièrs) is a commune in the Hérault department in southern France.

== Geography ==
The town of Cazouls lès Béziers is situated 15 kilometres north of the city of Béziers and is midway between the Mediterranean coast and the Languedoc Natural Park.

=== Climate ===
Cazouls-lès-Béziers has a mediterranean climate (Köppen climate classification Csa). The average annual temperature in Cazouls-lès-Béziers is 14.8 °C (58.6 °F). The average annual rainfall is 691.7 mm (27.23 in) with October as the wettest month. The temperatures are highest on average in July, at around 23.5 °C (74.3 °F), and lowest in January, at around 7.4 °C (45.3 °F). The highest temperature ever recorded in Cazouls-lès-Béziers was 41.0 °C (105.8 °F) on 30 July 2001; the coldest temperature ever recorded was −15.0 °C (5.0 °F) on 16 January 1985.

Climate data for Cazouls-lès-Béziers (1981–2010 averages, extremes 1980−2008)
Month	Jan	Feb	Mar	Apr	May	Jun	Jul	Aug	Sep	Oct	Nov	Dec	Year
Record high °C (°F)	21.8 (71.2)	23.0 (73.4)	29.5 (85.1)	31.0 (87.8)	37.3 (99.1)	38.7 (101.7)	41.0 (105.8)	40.2 (104.4)	36.4 (97.5)	33.5 (92.3)	24.2 (75.6)	23.5 (74.3)	41.0 (105.8)
Mean daily maximum °C (°F)	11.6 (52.9)	12.6 (54.7)	15.7 (60.3)	18.0 (64.4)	22.2 (72.0)	26.6 (79.9)	29.8 (85.6)	29.3 (84.7)	25.4 (77.7)	20.4 (68.7)	14.9 (58.8)	12.0 (53.6)	19.9 (67.8)
Daily mean °C (°F)	7.4 (45.3)	7.9 (46.2)	10.7 (51.3)	12.9 (55.2)	16.9 (62.4)	20.7 (69.3)	23.5 (74.3)	23.1 (73.6)	19.7 (67.5)	15.8 (60.4)	10.8 (51.4)	8.0 (46.4)	14.8 (58.6)
Mean daily minimum °C (°F)	3.3 (37.9)	3.3 (37.9)	5.7 (42.3)	7.9 (46.2)	11.6 (52.9)	14.8 (58.6)	17.2 (63.0)	17.0 (62.6)	14.0 (57.2)	11.2 (52.2)	6.7 (44.1)	3.9 (39.0)	9.8 (49.6)
Record low °C (°F)	−15.0 (5.0)	−9.2 (15.4)	−7.6 (18.3)	−1.0 (30.2)	2.8 (37.0)	6.5 (43.7)	9.0 (48.2)	8.0 (46.4)	5.2 (41.4)	−2.7 (27.1)	−7.0 (19.4)	−9.3 (15.3)	−15.0 (5.0)
Average precipitation mm (inches)	60.0 (2.36)	70.5 (2.78)	42.3 (1.67)	58.3 (2.30)	48.5 (1.91)	35.0 (1.38)	22.7 (0.89)	41.1 (1.62)	71.8 (2.83)	100.6 (3.96)	78.4 (3.09)	62.5 (2.46)	691.7 (27.23)
Average precipitation days (≥ 1.0 mm)	5.3	4.8	4.5	5.2	5.4	3.3	2.1	3.8	4.2	5.8	5.2	4.8	54.3
Source: Meteociel

== Population ==
Historical population
Year	Pop.	±% p.a.
1968	3,171	—
1975	3,050	−0.55%
1982	3,071	+0.10%
1990	3,251	+0.71%
1999	3,321	+0.24%
2007	4,050	+2.51%
2012	4,671	+2.89%
2017	4,987	+1.32%
2023	5,261	+0.90%
Source: INSEE

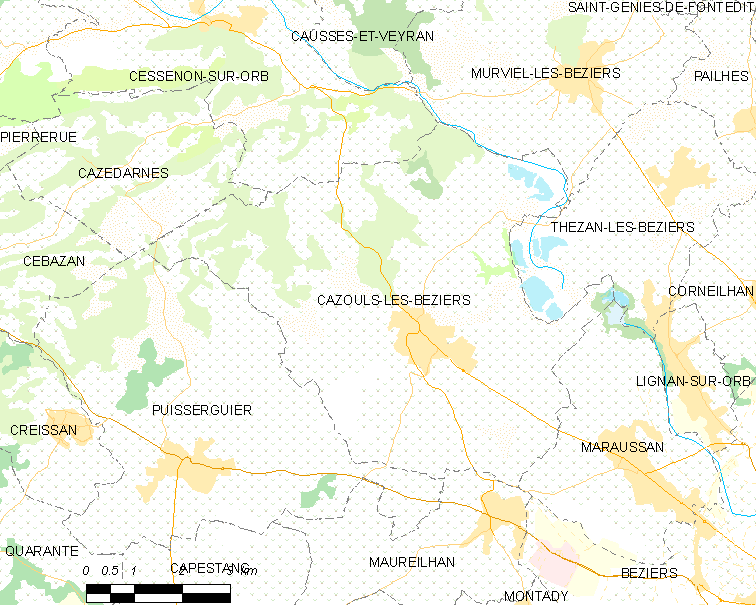
Map

== Economy ==
This is a rapidly growing town with new housing developments (lotissements), industrial zones and supermarkets. The town has good schools for students to the age of 16 years, a large new Gendarmerie and the most modern winery in the region. There is a good selection of supermarkets and other shops. Considerable improvements to roads and pavements make the town easy to explore. The local industry is substantially based on wine with many fine independent vintners and a large cooperative. The community is very active with many clubs and associations for sports and the arts, well supported by the Mairie. Sports facilities include a boulodrome, tennis courts, a 1.5 km exercise track and football and rugby pitches.

== Sights ==
=== Old town ===
Centred on the town square with the town hall, a fine church, an ancient clock tower and 2 bars, the buildings are mostly stone-built medieval houses that reflect their agrarian history. A walk through the old town will reveal narrow streets and interesting alleys interspersed with grand Maisons de Maître many sympathetically renovated. A substantial proportion of the older houses are now holiday homes and gîtes and the village centre is far livelier in summer than in winter.

=== Other sights ===
Places of interest include the Museum of Vignerons (Le Musee des Emiles), Roman Baths at Montmajou and the Chapelle de Notre Dame D’Ayde.

== See also ==
- Communes of the Hérault department

== Gallery ==
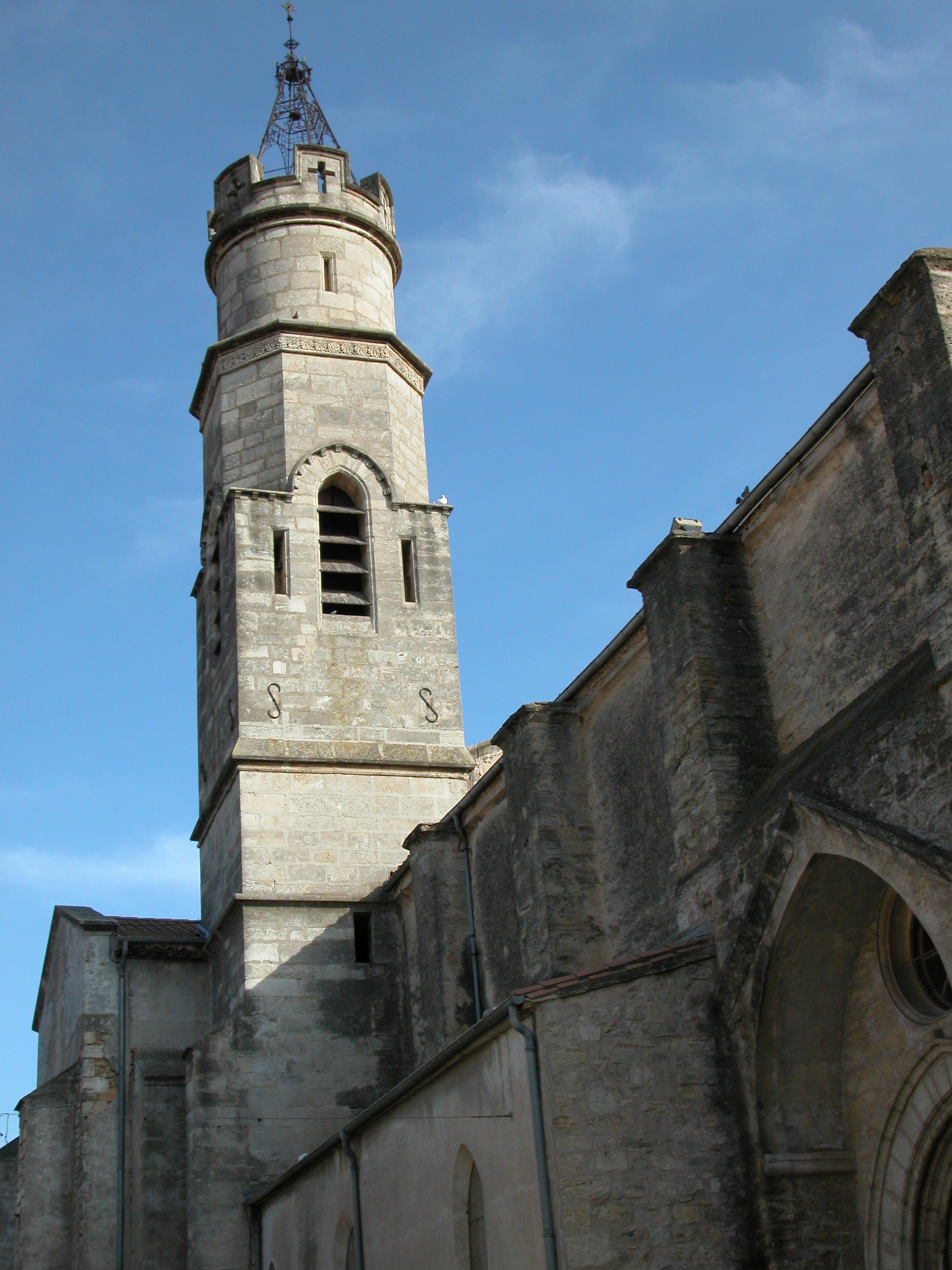
Church of Cazouls-lès-Béziers

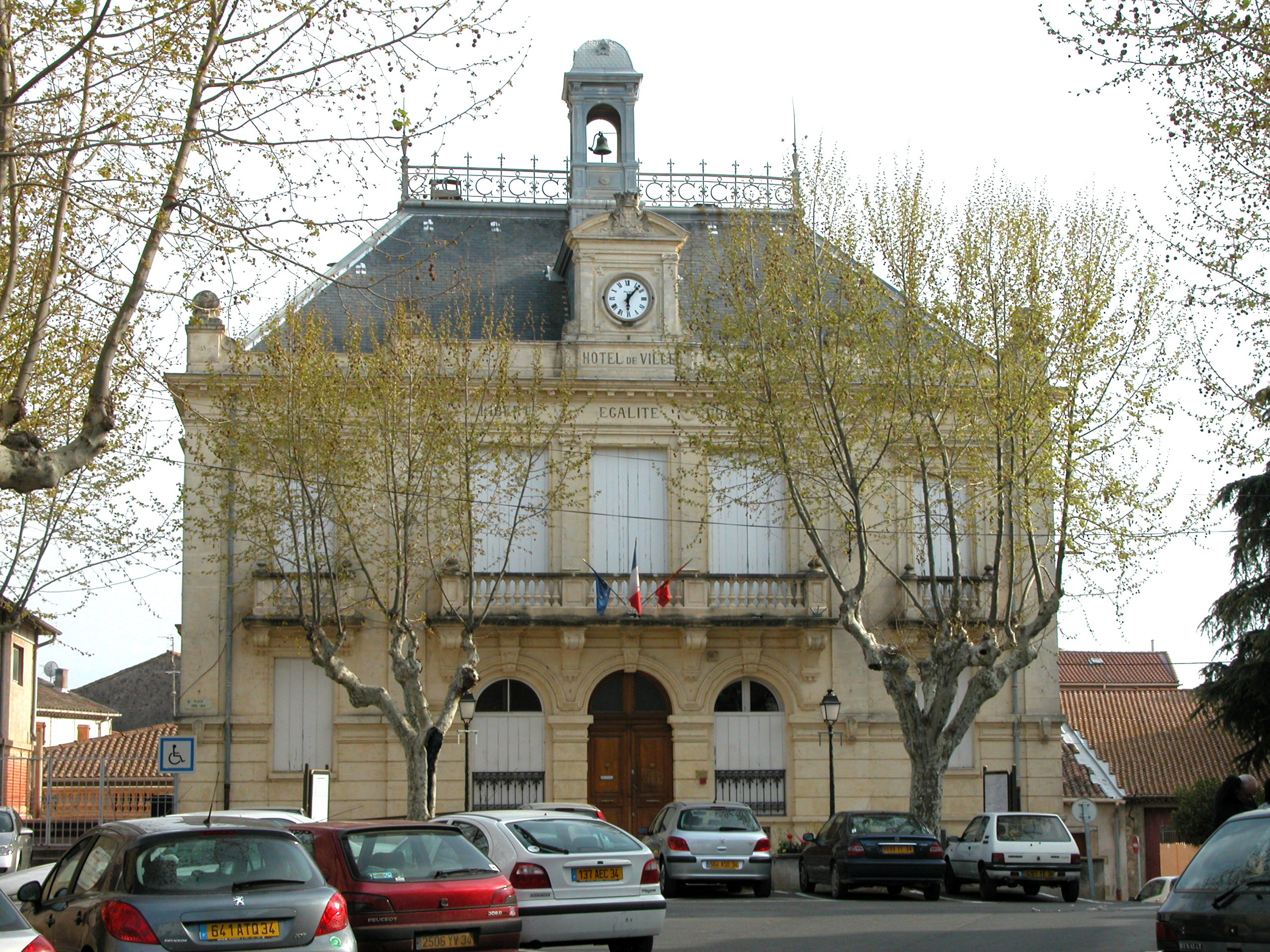
City hall

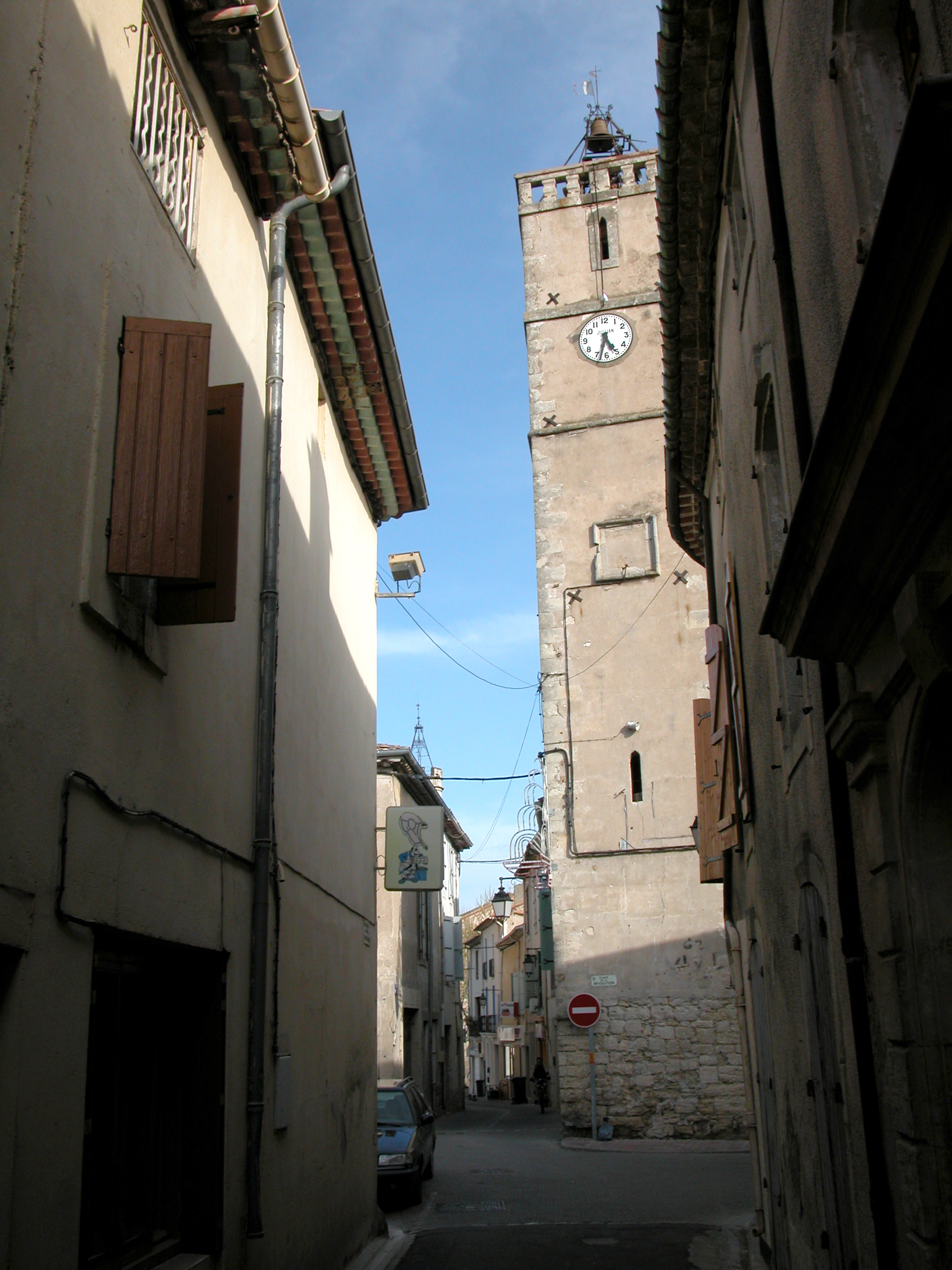
Clock tower

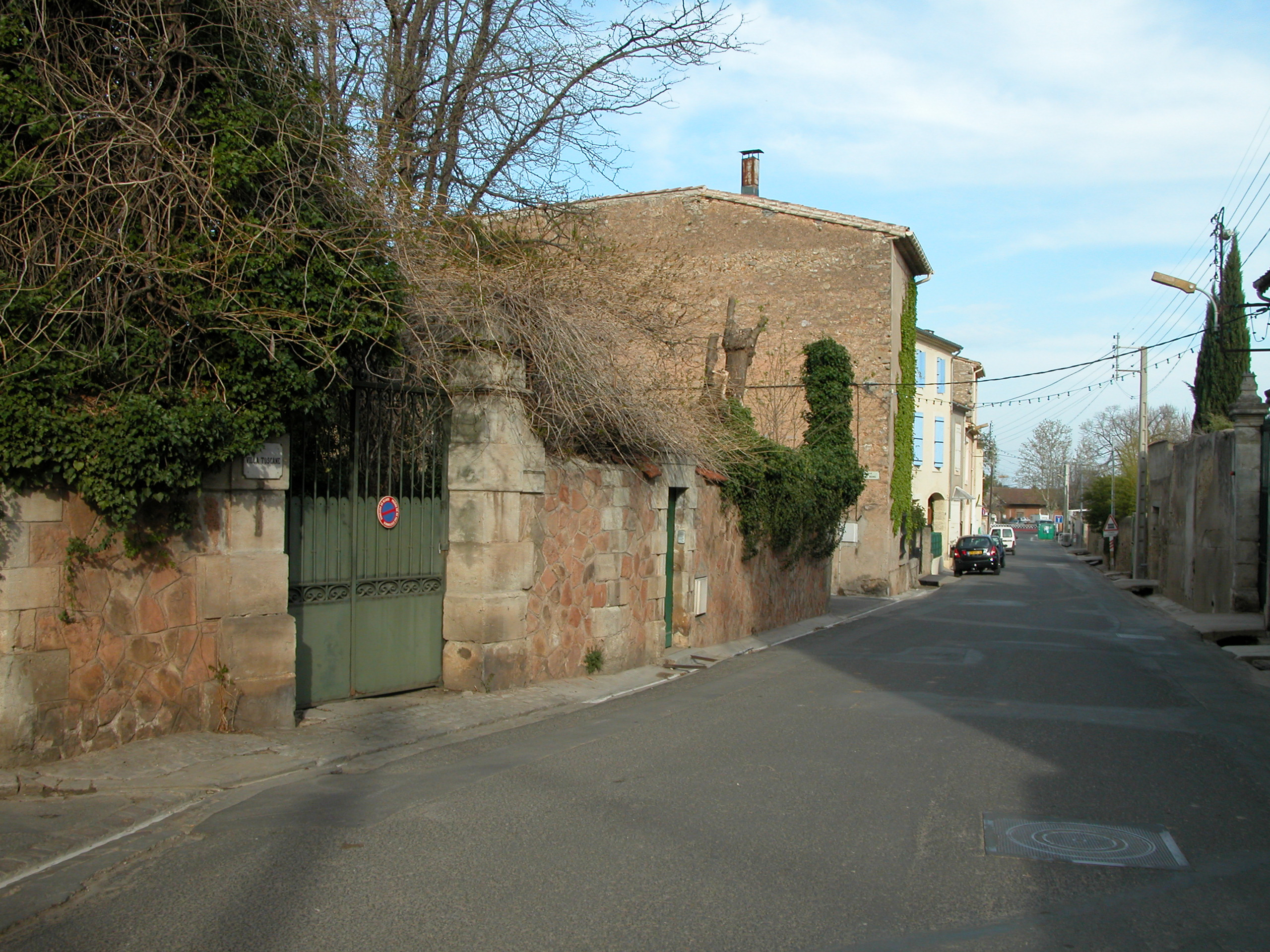
Street in Cazouls-lès-Béziers

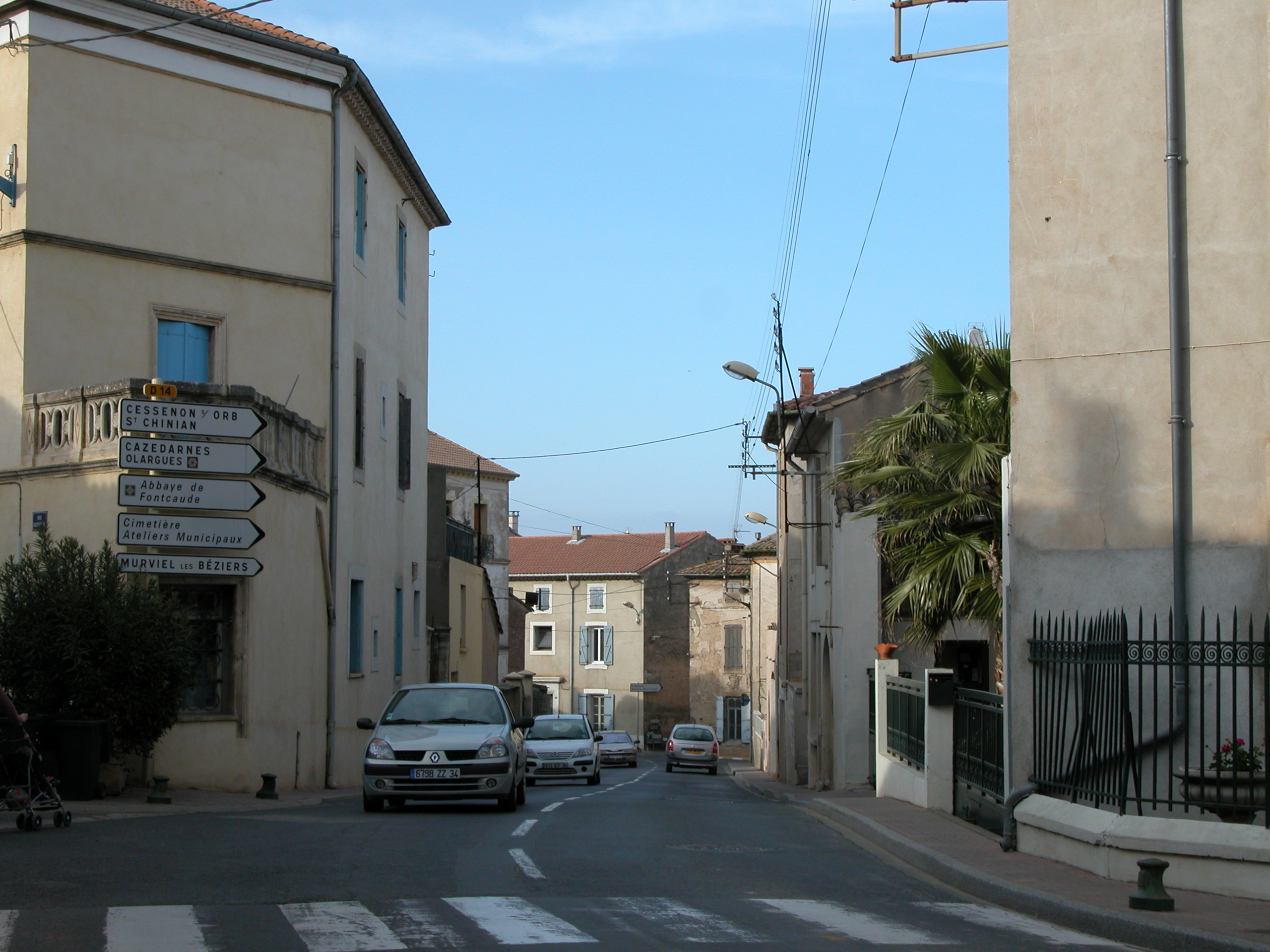
Street in Cazouls-lès-Béziers
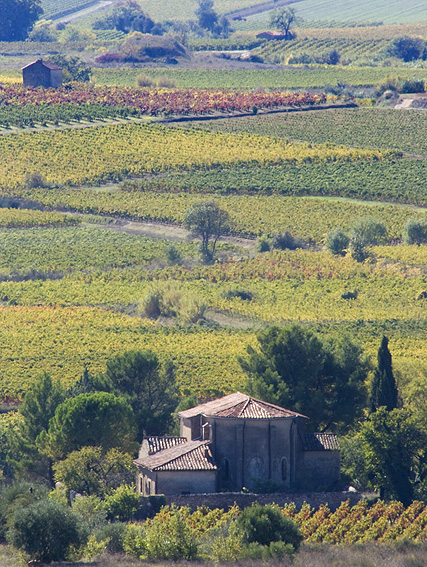
Abbey of Notre Dame D'Ayde

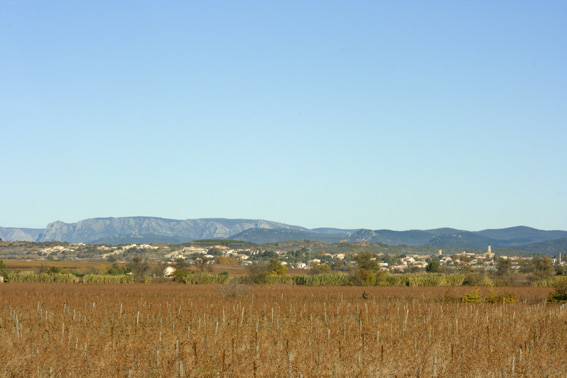
A view of Cazouls

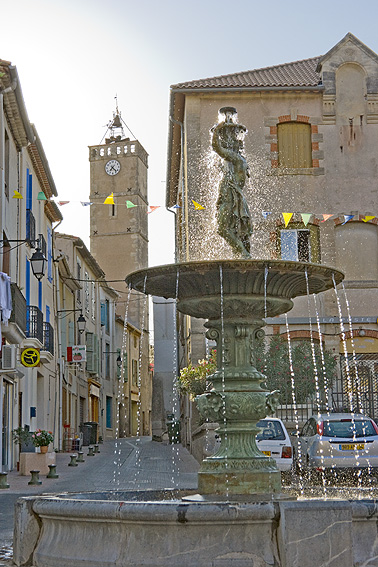
The fountain and tower

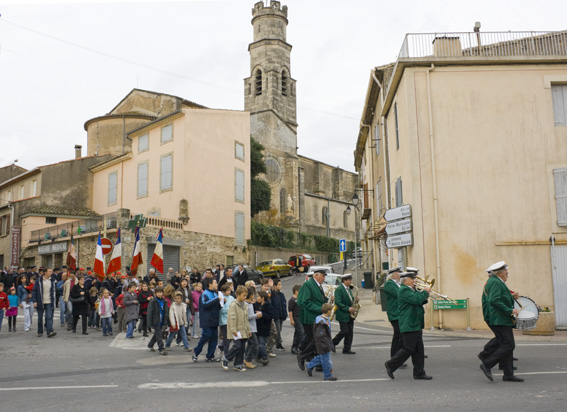
A parade with the band

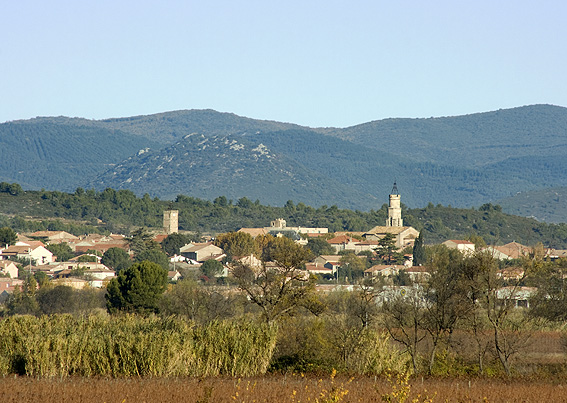
The church and the tower

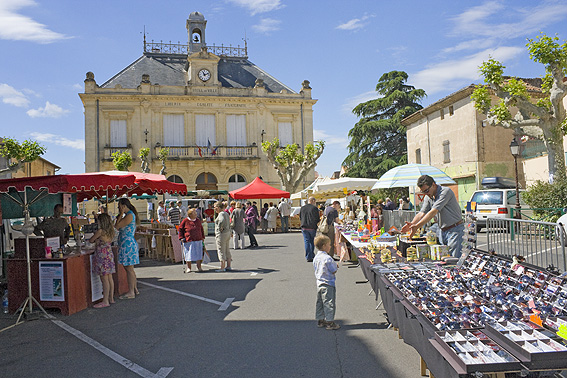
A market in the town square
