= Beyrède-Jumet =

Commune in Hautes-Pyrénées, France

- Part of Beyrède-Jumet-Camous
- Coat of arms
- Location of Beyrède-Jumet
- Location within France Location within Occitanie
- Coordinates: 42°57′32″N 0°22′36″E
- Country: France
- Region: Occitania
- Department: Hautes-Pyrénées
- Arrondissement: Bagnères-de-Bigorre
- Canton: Neste, Aure et Louron
- Commune: Beyrède-Jumet-Camous
- Area^{1}: 15.9 km^{2} (6.1 sq mi)
- Elevation: 688 m (2,257 ft)
- Highest elevation: 1,924 m (6,312 ft)
- Lowest elevation: 635 m (2,083 ft)
- Population (2023): 165
  - Density: 10.4/km^{2} (26.9/sq mi)
- Time zone: UTC+01:00 (CET)
  - Summer (DST): UTC+02:00 (CEST)
- Postal code: 65410
- ^{1} French Land Register data, which excludes lakes, ponds, glaciers > 1 km^{2} (0.386 sq mi or 247 acres) and river estuaries.

Beyrède-Jumet (Gascon: Veireda e Jumet) is a former commune in the Hautes-Pyrénées department in southwestern France. On 1 January 2019, it was merged into the new commune Beyrède-Jumet-Camous.

== See also ==
- Communes of the Hautes-Pyrénées department
