= Gran Premio Bruno Beghelli =

Italian one-day road cycling race

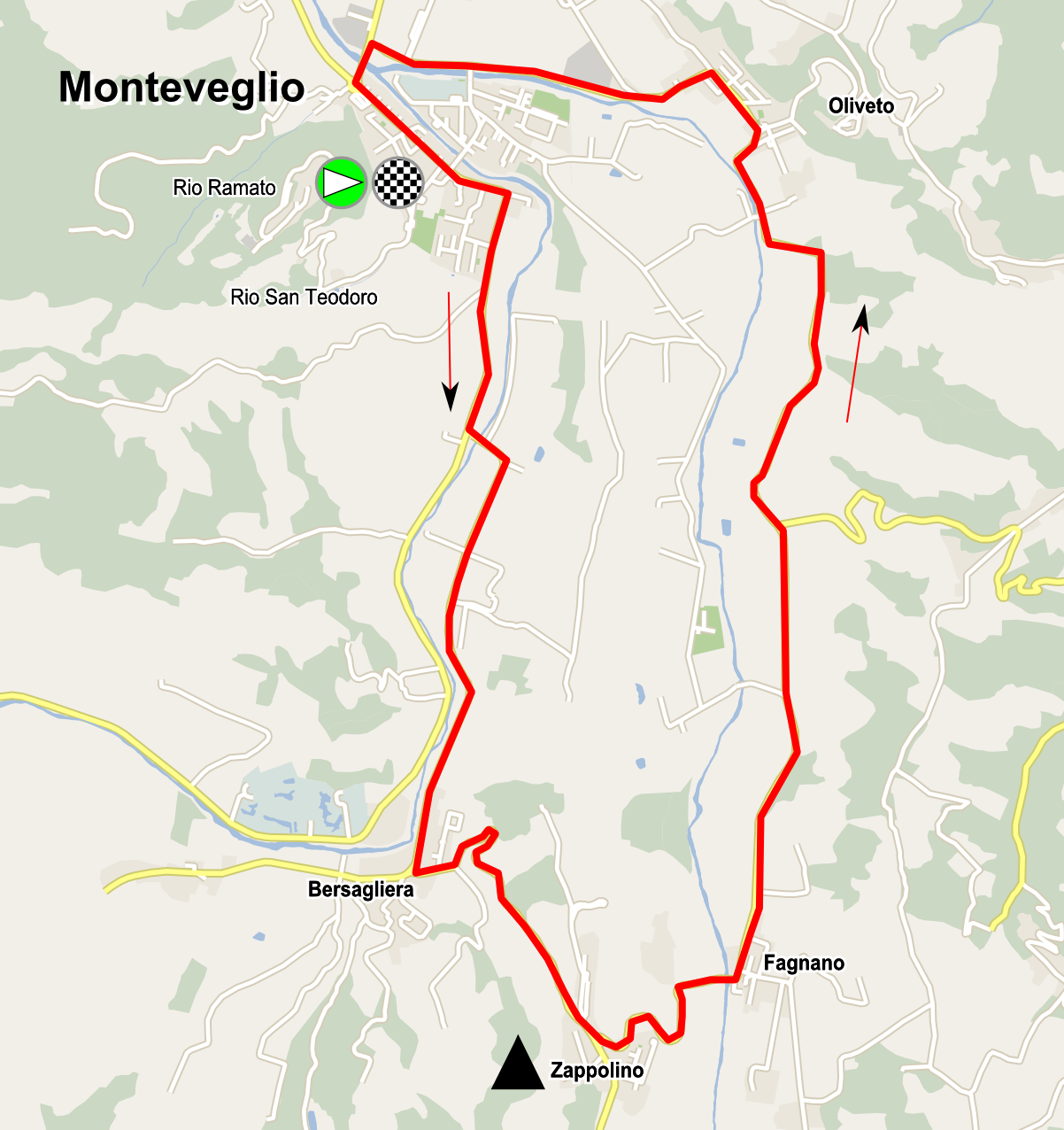

Race details
- Date: Mid October
- Region: Emilia-Romagna, Italy
- English name: Grand Prix Bruno Beghelli
- Local name(s): Gran Premio Bruno Beghelli (in Italian)
- Discipline: Road
- Competition: UCI Europe Tour
- Type: Single-day
- Organiser: Gruppo Sportivo Emilia
- Web site: www.gsemilia.it/a33_gp-bruno-beghelli.html

History
- First edition: 1996
- Editions: 24 (as of 2019)
- First winner: Mario Cipollini (ITA)
- Most wins: Stefano Zanini (ITA) (2 wins)
- Most recent: Sonny Colbrelli (ITA)

The Gran Premio Bruno Beghelli (also known as GP Beghelli) is a late season men's road bicycle race held annually in Monteveglio, near the city of Bologna, Italy. From 2005 to 2013, the race has been organised as a 1.1 event on the UCI Europe Tour, while in 2014 it was upgraded to 1.HC. It was first held in 1996, after the disappearance of the Milano–Vignola.

A women's race, the Gran Premio Bruno Beghelli Internazionale Donne Elite, has been held since 2016.

== Winners ==
Year	Country	Rider	Team
1996	Italy	Mario Cipollini	Saeco–AS Juvenes San Marino
1997	Italy	Stefano Zanini	Mapei–GB
1998	Italy	Stefano Zanini	Mapei–Bricobi
1999	Netherlands	Michael Boogerd	Rabobank
2000	Italy	Marco Serpellini	Lampre–Daikin
2001	Belgium	Andrei Tchmil	Lotto–Adecco
2002	Italy	Gianluca Bortolami	Tacconi Sport
2003	Italy	Luca Paolini	Quick-Step–Davitamon
2004	Germany	Danilo Hondo	Gerolsteiner
2005	Brazil	Murilo Fischer	Naturino–Sapore di Mare
2006	Italy	Sergio Marinangeli	Naturino–Sapore di Mare
2007	Italy	Damiano Cunego	Lampre–Fondital
2008	Italy	Alessandro Petacchi	LPR Brakes–Ballan
2009	Spain	Francisco Ventoso	Carmiooro A Style
2010	Italy	Dario Cataldo	Quick-Step
2011	Italy	Filippo Pozzato	Team Katusha
2012	Denmark	Nicki Sørensen	Saxo Bank–Tinkoff Bank
2013	Colombia	Leonardo Duque	Colombia
2014	Italy	Valerio Conti	Lampre–Merida
2015	Italy	Sonny Colbrelli	Bardiani–CSF
2016	Italy	Nicola Ruffoni	Bardiani–CSF
2017	Spain	Luis León Sánchez	Astana
2018	Netherlands	Bauke Mollema	Trek–Segafredo
2019	Italy	Sonny Colbrelli	Bahrain–Merida
