= 2024 Team Jayco–AlUla (men's team) season =

Team Jayco–AlUla
- 2024 season
- UCI code: JAY
- Status: UCI WorldTeam
- Owner: Gerry Ryan
- Manager: Brent Copeland (RSA)
- Main sponsor(s): Jayco; City of Al-'Ula
- Based: Australia

Season victories
- One-day races: 5
- Stage race overall: 2
- Stage race stages: 12
- National Championships: 5
- Most wins: (Netherlands) Dylan Groenewegen (4)

The 2024 season for the Team Jayco–AlUla team is the team's 13th season in existence, all of which have been as a UCI WorldTeam.

== Team roster ==
As of 5 January 2024.

Rider	Date of birth
Welay Berhe (ETH)	22 October 2001 (age 23)
Lawson Craddock (USA)	20 February 1992 (age 33)
Alessandro De Marchi (ITA)	19 May 1986 (age 38)
Davide De Pretto (ITA)	19 April 2002 (age 22)
Eddie Dunbar (IRE)	1 September 1996 (age 28)
Luke Durbridge (AUS)	9 April 1991 (age 33)
Felix Engelhardt (GER)	19 August 2000 (age 24)
Caleb Ewan (AUS)	11 July 1994 (age 30)
Anders Foldager (DEN)	27 July 2001 (age 23)
Dylan Groenewegen (NED)	21 June 1993 (age 31)
Lucas Hamilton (AUS)	12 February 1996 (age 29)
Chris Harper (AUS)	23 November 1994 (age 30)
Michael Hepburn (AUS)	17 August 1991 (age 33)
Amund Grøndahl Jansen (NOR)	11 February 1994 (age 31)
Christopher Juul-Jensen (DEN)	6 July 1989 (age 35)

Rider	Date of birth
Jan Maas (NED)	19 February 1996 (age 29)
Michael Matthews (AUS)	26 September 1990 (age 34)
Luka Mezgec (SLO)	27 June 1988 (age 36)
Kelland O'Brien (AUS)	22 May 1998 (age 26)
Jesús David Peña (COL)	8 May 2000 (age 24)
Luke Plapp (AUS)	25 December 2000 (age 24)
Rudy Porter (AUS)	15 December 2000 (age 24)
Blake Quick (AUS)	26 February 2000 (age 25)
Elmar Reinders (NED)	14 March 1992 (age 33)
Mauro Schmid (SUI)	4 December 1999 (age 25)
Callum Scotson (AUS)	10 August 1996 (age 28)
Campbell Stewart (NZL)	12 May 1998 (age 26)
Max Walscheid (GER)	13 June 1993 (age 31)
Simon Yates (GBR)	7 August 1992 (age 32)
Filippo Zana (ITA)	18 March 1999 (age 26)

Riders who joined the team for the 2024 season

Rider	2023 team
Davide De Pretto	neo-pro (Zalf Euromobil Fior)
Caleb Ewan	Lotto–Dstny
Anders Foldager	neo-pro (Biesse–Carrera)
Luke Plapp	Ineos Grenadiers
Mauro Schmid	Soudal–Quick-Step
Max Walscheid	Cofidis

Riders who left the team during or after the 2023 season

Rider	2024 team
Alexandre Balmer	Team Corratec–Vini Fantini
Kevin Colleoni	Intermarché–Wanty
Tsgabu Grmay	Retired
Lukas Pöstlberger	No team
Matteo Sobrero	Bora–Hansgrohe
Zdeněk Štybar	Retired

== Season victories ==
Date	Race	Competition	Rider	Country	Location	Ref.
20 January	Trofeo Luis Puig	UCI Europe Tour	Dylan Groenewegen (NED)	Spain	Valencia	
21 January	Ruta de la Cerámica	UCI Europe Tour	Michael Matthews (AUS)	Spain	Onda	
3 February	AlUla Tour, Stage 5	UCI Asia Tour	Simon Yates (GBR)	Saudi Arabia	Skyviews of Harrat Uwayrid	
3 February	AlUla Tour, Overall	UCI Asia Tour	Simon Yates (GBR)	Saudi Arabia		
10 February	Tour of Oman, Stage 1	UCI ProSeries	Caleb Ewan (AUS)	Oman	Muscat	
16 April	Tour of the Alps, Stage 2	UCI ProSeries	Alessandro De Marchi (ITA)	Italy/Austria	Stans	
20 May	Ronde van Limburg	UCI Europe Tour	Dylan Groenewegen (NED)	Belgium	Tongeren	
12 June	Tour of Slovenia, Stage 1	UCI ProSeries	Dylan Groenewegen (NED)	Slovenia	Ormož	
26 June	Tour of Slovakia, Stage 1 (TTT)	UCI Europe Tour	(Note: The winning riders were Felix Engelhardt, Anders Foldager, Mauro Schmid, Callum Scotson, and Max Walscheid.)	Slovakia	Dunajská Streda	
27 June	Tour of Slovakia, Stage 2	UCI Europe Tour	Anders Foldager (DEN)	Slovakia	Hlohovec	
30 June	Tour of Slovakia, Stage 5	UCI Europe Tour	Felix Engelhardt (GER)	Slovakia	Štrbské Pleso	
30 June	Tour of Slovakia, Overall	UCI Europe Tour	Mauro Schmid (SUI)	Slovakia		
30 June	Tour of Slovakia, Team classification	UCI Europe Tour	(Note: The riders in the squad were Felix Engelhardt, Anders Foldager, Michael Hepburn, Amund Grøndahl Jansen, Mauro Schmid, Callum Scotson, and Max Walscheid.)	Slovakia		
3 July	Tour of Austria, Stage 1	UCI Europe Tour	Davide De Pretto (ITA)	Austria	Bad Tatzmannsdorf	
4 July	Tour de France, Stage 6	UCI World Tour	Dylan Groenewegen (NED)	France	Dijon	
23 July	Vuelta a Castilla y León	UCI Europe Tour	Caleb Ewan (AUS)	Spain	Cistérniga	
6 August	Vuelta a Burgos, Stage 2	UCI ProSeries	Caleb Ewan (AUS)	Spain	Ojo Guareña	
28 August	Vuelta a España, Stage 11	UCI World Tour	Eddie Dunbar (IRL)	Spain	Padrón	
7 September	Vuelta a España, Stage 20	UCI World Tour	Eddie Dunbar (IRL)	Spain	Picón Blanco	
13 September	Grand Prix Cycliste de Québec	UCI World Tour	Michael Matthews (AUS)	Canada	Quebec	
25 September	Omloop van het Houtland	UCI Europe Tour	Max Walscheid (GER)	Belgium	Lichtervelde	

== National, Continental, and World Champions ==
Date	Discipline	Jersey	Rider	Country	Location	Ref.
4 January	Australian National Time Trial Championships		Luke Plapp (AUS)	Australia	Mount Helena	
7 January	Australian National Road Race Championships		Luke Plapp (AUS)	Australia	Buninyong	
20 June	Irish National Time Trial Championships		Eddie Dunbar (IRL)	Ireland	Athea	
23 June	Swiss National Road Race Championships		Mauro Schmid (SUI)	Switzerland	Aire-la-Ville	
23 June	Dutch National Road Race Championships		Dylan Groenewegen (NED)	Netherlands	Arnhem	
