= 2024 Soudal–Quick-Step season =

Soudal–Quick-Step
- 2024 season
- UCI code: SOQ
- Status: UCI WorldTeam
- Manager: Patrick Lefevere (BEL)
- Main sponsor(s): Soudal; Quick-Step Flooring
- Based: Belgium
- Bicycles: Specialized
- Groupset: Shimano

Season victories
- One-day races: 6
- Stage race overall: 1
- Stage race stages: 27
- World Championships: 1
- Most wins: Tim Merlier (BEL) (16)

The 2024 season for the Soudal–Quick-Step is the 22nd season in the team's existence. The team has been a UCI WorldTeam since 2005, when the tier was first established.

== Team roster ==
As of 16 January 2024.

Rider	Date of birth
Julian Alaphilippe (FRA)	11 June 1992 (aged 31)
Kasper Asgreen (DEN)	8 February 1995 (aged 28)
Ayco Bastiaens (BEL)	3 June 1996 (aged 27)
Mattia Cattaneo (ITA)	25 October 1990 (aged 33)
Josef Černý (CZE)	11 May 1993 (aged 30)
Remco Evenepoel (BEL)	25 January 2000 (aged 23)
Gil Gelders (BEL)	16 December 2002 (age 22)
Jan Hirt (CZE)	21 January 1991 (aged 32)
Antoine Huby (FRA)	19 January 2001 (aged 22)
James Knox (GBR)	4 November 1995 (aged 28)
Yves Lampaert (BEL)	10 April 1991 (aged 32)
Luke Lamperti (USA)	31 December 2002 (aged 21)
Mikel Landa (ESP)	13 December 1989 (aged 34)
William Junior Lecerf (BEL)	15 October 2002 (age 22)

Rider	Date of birth
Paul Magnier (FRA)	14 April 2004 (aged 19)
Fausto Masnada (ITA)	6 November 1993 (aged 30)
Tim Merlier (BEL)	30 October 1992 (aged 31)
Gianni Moscon (ITA)	20 April 1994 (aged 29)
Casper Pedersen (DEN)	15 March 1996 (aged 27)
Pepijn Reinderink (NED)	4 May 2002 (aged 21)
Pieter Serry (BEL)	21 November 1988 (aged 35)
Martin Svrček (SVK)	17 February 2003 (aged 20)
Bert Van Lerberghe (BEL)	29 September 1992 (aged 31)
Ilan Van Wilder (BEL)	14 May 2000 (aged 23)
Warre Vangheluwe (BEL)	23 July 2001 (age 23)
Mauri Vansevenant (BEL)	1 June 1999 (aged 24)
Louis Vervaeke (BEL)	6 October 1993 (aged 30)
Jordi Warlop (BEL)	4 June 1996 (aged 27)

== Season victories ==
Date	Race	Competition	Rider	Country	Location	Ref.
25 January	Trofeo Ses Salines-Felanitx	UCI Europe Tour	Paul Magnier (FRA)	Spain	Felanitx	
1 February	AlUla Tour, stage 3	UCI Asia Tour	Tim Merlier (BEL)	Saudi Arabia	Camel Cup Track	
2 February	AlUla Tour, stage 4	UCI Asia Tour	Tim Merlier (BEL)	Saudi Arabia	Maraya	
10 February	Figueira Champions Classic	UCI ProSeries	Remco Evenepoel (BEL)	Portugal	Figueira da Foz	
12 February	Tour of Oman, stage 3	UCI ProSeries	Paul Magnier (FRA)	Oman	Al-Bustan	
17 February	Volta ao Algarve, stage 4 (ITT)	UCI ProSeries	Remco Evenepoel (BEL)	Portugal	Albufeira	
18 February	Volta ao Algarve, overall	UCI ProSeries	Remco Evenepoel (BEL)	Portugal		
19 February	UAE Tour, stage 1	UCI World Tour	Tim Merlier (BEL)	United Arab Emirates	Liwa Palace	
22 February	UAE Tour, stage 4	UCI World Tour	Tim Merlier (BEL)	United Arab Emirates	Dubai Marina	
24 February	UAE Tour, stage 6	UCI World Tour	Tim Merlier (BEL)	United Arab Emirates	Abu Dhabi	
10 March	Paris–Nice, stage 8	UCI World Tour	Remco Evenepoel (BEL)	France	Nice	
13 March	Nokere Koerse	UCI ProSeries	Tim Merlier (BEL)	Belgium	Kruishoutem	
3 April	Scheldeprijs	UCI ProSeries	Tim Merlier (BEL)	Belgium	Schoten	
6 May	Giro d'Italia, stage 3	UCI World Tour	Tim Merlier (BEL)	Italy	Fossano	
16 May	Giro d'Italia, stage 12	UCI World Tour	Julian Alaphilippe (FRA)	Italy	Fano	
17 May	Four Days of Dunkirk, stage 4	UCI ProSeries	Warre Vangheluwe (BEL)	France	Pont-à-Marcq	
23 May	Giro d'Italia, stage 18	UCI World Tour	Tim Merlier (BEL)	Italy	Padua	
26 May	Giro d'Italia, stage 21	UCI World Tour	Tim Merlier (BEL)	Italy	Rome	
5 June	Critérium du Dauphiné, stage 4 (ITT)	UCI World Tour	Remco Evenepoel (BEL)	France	Neulise	
9 June	Tour de Suisse, stage 1 (ITT)	UCI World Tour	Yves Lampaert (BEL)	Liechtenstein	Vaduz	
13 June	Tour of Belgium, stage 2	UCI ProSeries	Tim Merlier (BEL)	Belgium	Knokke-Heist	
16 June	Tour of Belgium, stage 5	UCI ProSeries	Tim Merlier (BEL)	Belgium	Brussel	
13 June	Okolo Slovenska, stage 3	UCI Europe Tour	Julian Alaphilippe (FRA)	Slovakia	Dubnica nad Váhom	
5 July	Tour de France, stage 7 (ITT)	UCI World Tour	Remco Evenepoel (BEL)	France	Gevrey-Chambertin	
25 July	Czech Tour, stage 1	UCI Europe Tour	Luke Lamperti (USA)	Czech Republic	Ostrava	
28 July	Czech Tour, stage 4	UCI Europe Tour	Julian Alaphilippe (FRA)	Czech Republic	Šternberk	
16 August	Tour de Pologne, stage 5	UCI World Tour	Tim Merlier (BEL)	Poland	Katowice	
3 September	Tour of Britain, stage 1	UCI ProSeries	Paul Magnier (FRA)	United Kingdom	Kelso	
6 September	Tour of Britain, stage 4	UCI ProSeries	Paul Magnier (FRA)	United Kingdom	Newark-on-Trent	
7 September	Tour of Britain, stage 5	UCI ProSeries	Paul Magnier (FRA)	United Kingdom	Northampton	
20 September	Tour de Luxembourg, stage 3	UCI ProSeries	Mauri Vansevenant (BEL)	Luxembourg	Diekirch	
20 September	Kampioenschap van Vlaanderen	UCI Europe Tour	Tim Merlier (BEL)	Belgium	Koolskamp	
22 September	Gooikse Pijl	UCI Europe Tour	Tim Merlier (BEL)	Belgium	Gooik	
16 October	Tour of Guangxi, stage 2	UCI World Tour	Warre Vangheluwe (BEL)	China	Jingxi	

== National, Continental, and World Champions ==
Date	Discipline	Jersey	Rider	Country	Location	Ref.
15 September	European Continental Road Race Championships		Tim Merlier (BEL)	Belgium	Hasselt	
22 September	World Time Trial Championships		Remco Evenepoel (BEL)	Switzerland	Zürich	
