= 2024 Tudor Pro Cycling Team season =

Tudor Pro Cycling Team
- 2024 season
- UCI code: TUD
- Status: UCI ProTeam
- Manager: Raphael Meyer (SUI)
- Based: Switzerland
- Bicycles: BMC
- Groupset: SRAM

Season victories
- Stage race stages: 4
- Most wins: four riders (1 win each)

The 2024 season for the Tudor Pro Cycling Team team is the team's 6th season in existence, and its 2nd season as a UCI ProTeam.

== Team roster ==
As of 17 January 2024.

| Rider | Date of birth |
|---|---|
| Tom Bohli (SUI) | 17 January 1994 (age 31) |
| Marco Brenner (GER) | 27 August 2002 (age 22) |
| Nils Brun (SUI) | 14 June 2000 (age 24) |
| Aloïs Charrin (FRA) | 8 September 2000 (age 24) |
| Alberto Dainese (ITA) | 25 March 1998 (age 26) |
| Arvid de Kleijn (NED) | 21 March 1994 (age 30) |
| Jacob Eriksson (SWE) | 1 October 1999 (age 25) |
| Lucas Eriksson (SWE) | 10 April 1996 (age 28) |
| Robin Froidevaux (SUI) | 17 October 1998 (age 26) |
| Miká Heming (GER) | 6 April 2000 (age 24) |
| Alexander Kamp (DEN) | 14 December 1993 (age 31) |
| Petr Kelemen (CZE) | 18 November 2000 (age 24) |
| Arthur Kluckers (LUX) | 15 March 2000 (age 25) |
| Sebastian Kolze Changizi (DEN) | 29 December 2000 (age 24) |

| Rider | Date of birth |
|---|---|
| Alexander Krieger (GER) | 28 November 1991 (age 33) |
| Marius Mayrhofer (GER) | 18 September 2000 (age 24) |
| Simon Pellaud (SUI) | 6 November 1992 (age 32) |
| Rick Pluimers (NED) | 7 December 2000 (age 24) |
| Sébastien Reichenbach (SUI) | 28 May 1989 (age 35) |
| Michael Storer (AUS) | 28 February 1997 (age 28) |
| Florian Stork (GER) | 27 April 1997 (age 27) |
| Joel Suter (SUI) | 25 October 1998 (age 26) |
| Roland Thalmann (SUI) | 5 August 1993 (age 31) |
| Matteo Trentin (ITA) | 2 August 1989 (age 35) |
| Yannis Voisard (SUI) | 26 July 1998 (age 26) |
| Hannes Wilksch (GER) | 30 October 2001 (age 23) |
| Luc Wirtgen (LUX) | 7 July 1998 (age 26) |
| Maikel Zijlaard (NED) | 1 June 1999 (age 25) |

== Season victories ==
| Date | Race | Competition | Rider | Country | Location | Ref. |
|---|---|---|---|---|---|---|
| 4 March | Paris–Nice, stage 2 | UCI World Tour | Arvid de Kleijn (NED) | France | Montargis | |
| 19 March | Settimana Internazionale di Coppi e Bartali, stage 1 | UCI Europe Tour | Marco Brenner (GER) | Italy | Pesaro | |
| 4 April | Région Pays de la Loire Tour, stage 3 | UCI Europe Tour | Alberto Dainese (ITA) | France | Château-Gontier | |
| 23 April | Tour de Romandie, prologue | UCI World Tour | Maikel Zijlaard (NED) | Switzerland | Payerne | |

== National, Continental, and World Champions ==
| Date | Discipline | Jersey | Rider | Country | Location | Ref. |
