= 2024 Arkéa–B&B Hotels (men's team) season =

Arkéa–B&B Hotels
- 2024 season
- UCI code: BSE
- Status: UCI WorldTeam
- Manager: Emmanuel Hubert (FRA); Didier Rous (FRA)
- Main sponsor(s): Arkea; B&B Hotels
- Based: France

Season victories
- One-day races: 4
- Stage race stages: 5
- Most wins: (France) Arnaud Démare (France) Kévin Vauquelin (2 wins each)

The 2024 season for the Arkéa–B&B Hotels team is the team's 21st season in existence, the second as a UCI WorldTeam.

== Team roster ==
As of 14 January 2024.

Rider	Date of birth
Vincenzo Albanese (ITA)	12 November 1996 (aged 27)
Louis Barré (FRA)	6 April 2000 (aged 23)
Jenthe Biermans (BEL)	30 October 1995 (aged 28)
Amaury Capiot (BEL)	25 June 1993 (aged 30)
Clément Champoussin (FRA)	29 May 1998 (aged 25)
Ewen Costiou (FRA)	10 November 2002 (aged 21)
David Dekker (NED)	2 February 1998 (aged 25)
Anthony Delaplace (FRA)	11 September 1989 (aged 34)
Arnaud Démare (FRA)	26 August 1991 (aged 32)
Raúl García Pierna (ESP)	23 February 2001 (aged 22)
Élie Gesbert (FRA)	1 July 1995 (aged 28)
Donavan Grondin (FRA)	26 September 2000 (aged 23)
Thibault Guernalec (FRA)	31 July 1997 (aged 26)
Simon Guglielmi (FRA)	1 July 1997 (aged 26)
Laurens Huys (BEL)	28 September 1998 (aged 25)

Rider	Date of birth
Mathis Le Berre (FRA)	16 April 2001 (aged 22)
Kévin Ledanois (FRA)	13 July 1993 (aged 30)
Matis Louvel (FRA)	19 July 1999 (aged 24)
Daniel McLay (GBR)	3 January 1992 (aged 31)
Luca Mozzato (ITA)	15 February 1998 (aged 25)
Łukasz Owsian (POL)	24 February 1990 (aged 33)
Michel Ries (LUX)	11 March 1998 (aged 25)
Alan Riou (FRA)	2 April 1997 (aged 26)
Cristián Rodríguez (ESP)	3 March 1995 (aged 28)
Miles Scotson (AUS)	18 January 1994 (aged 29)
Florian Sénéchal (FRA)	10 July 1993 (aged 30)
Kevin Vauquelin (FRA)	26 April 2001 (aged 22)
Clément Venturini (FRA)	16 October 1993 (aged 30)
Alessandro Verre (ITA)	17 November 2001 (aged 22)

== Season victories ==
Date	Race	Competition	Rider	Country	Location	Ref.
4 February	Étoile de Bessèges, stage 5 (ITT)	UCI Europe Tour	Kévin Vauquelin (FRA)	France	Alès	
13 February	Tour of Oman, stage 4	UCI ProSeries	Amaury Capiot (FRA)	Oman	Yiti	
15 March	Bredene Koksijde Classic	UCI ProSeries	Luca Mozzato (ITA)	Belgium	Koksijde	
29 March	Route Adélie de Vitré	UCI Europe Tour	Jenthe Biermans (BEL)	France	Vitré	
3 April	Région Pays de la Loire Tour, stage 2	UCI Europe Tour	Ewen Costiou (FRA)	France	Sarthe	
30 June	Tour de France, stage 2	UCI World Tour	Kévin Vauquelin (FRA)	Italy	Bologna	
23 August	Tour Poitou-Charentes en Nouvelle-Aquitaine, stage 4	UCI Europe Tour	Arnaud Démare (FRA)	France	Poitiers	
11 September	Giro della Toscana	UCI Europe Tour	Clément Champoussin (FRA)	Italy	Pontedera	
22 September	Paris-Chauny	UCI Europe Tour	Arnaud Démare (FRA)	France	Chauny	
