= 2024 Le Samyn =

2024 UCI Europe Tour
- Poster with previous winners Milan Menten and Marta Bastianelli

Race details
- Dates: 27 February 2024
- Stages: 1
- Distance: 204.3 km (126.9 mi)
- Winning time: 4h 38' 40"

Results
	Winner	Laurenz Rex (BEL)	(Intermarché–Wanty)
	Second	António Morgado (POR)	(UAE Team Emirates)
	Third	Jenthe Biermans (BEL)	(Arkéa–B&B Hotels)

The 2024 Le Samyn was the 56th edition of the Le Samyn road cycling one day race in Belgium. It was a 1.1-rated event on the 2024 UCI Europe Tour and the first event in the 2024 Belgian Road Cycling Cup. The 204.3 kilometres (126.9 mi) long race started in Quaregnon and finished in Dour, with almost four laps of a finishing circuit that featured several cobbled sections and climbs.

== Teams ==
Five UCI WorldTeams, eight UCI ProTeams, and eleven UCI Continental teams made up the twenty-four teams that participated in the race. 116 of 164 riders finished the race.

UCI WorldTeams

- Alpecin–Deceuninck
- Arkéa–B&B Hotels
- Intermarché–Wanty
- Team dsm–firmenich PostNL
- UAE Team Emirates

UCI ProTeams

- Bingoal WB
- Equipo Kern Pharma
- Lotto–Dstny
- Q36.5 Pro Cycling Team
- TDT–Unibet Cycling Team
- Team Flanders–Baloise
- Uno-X Mobility

UCI Continental Teams

- Diftar Continental Cyclingteam
- Équipe Continentale Groupama–FDJ
- Israel Premier Tech Academy
- Metec–Solarwatt p/b Mantel
- Novapor Speedbike Team
- Philippe Wagner–Bazin
- St. Michel–Mavic–Auber93
- Tarteletto–Isorex
- Team Storck–Metropol Cycling
- Van Rysel–Roubaix
- VolkerWessels Cycling Team

== Result ==
Result
Rank	Rider	Team	Time
1	Laurenz Rex (BEL)	Intermarché–Wanty	4h 38' 40"
2	António Morgado (POR)	UAE Team Emirates	+ 0"
3	Jenthe Biermans (BEL)	Arkéa–B&B Hotels	+ 0"
4	Rasmus Tiller (NOR)	Uno-X Mobility	+ 0"
5	Timo Kielich (BEL)	Alpecin–Deceuninck	+ 0"
6	Jens Reynders (BEL)	Bingoal WB	+ 0"
7	Alexandre Delettre (FRA)	St. Michel–Mavic–Auber93	+ 0"
8	Laurence Pithie (NZL)	Équipe Continentale Groupama–FDJ	+ 0"
9	Amaury Capiot (BEL)	Arkéa–B&B Hotels	+ 0"
10	Vito Braet (BEL)	Intermarché–Wanty	+ 0"
