= 2026 Muscat Classic =

2026 UCI ProSeries

Race details
- Dates: 6 February 2026
- Stages: 1
- Distance: 176.2 km (109.5 mi)
- Winning time: 4h 14' 36"

Results
	Winner	Mauro Schmid (SUI)	(Team Jayco–AlUla)
	Second	Adam Yates (GBR)	(UAE Team Emirates XRG)
	Third	Luke Plapp (AUS)	(Team Jayco–AlUla)

The 2026 Muscat Classic was the 4th edition of the Muscat Classic single-day cycling race. It was held on 6 February 2026 over a distance of 176.2 km, starting in Al Mouj and ending in Al Bustan.

== Teams ==
Eleven UCI WorldTeams, six UCI ProTeams, and the Omani national team made up the 18 teams that participated in the race.

UCI WorldTeams

- Alpecin–Premier Tech
- EF Education–EasyPost
- Groupama–FDJ United
- Lotto–Intermarché
- Movistar Team
- Soudal–Quick-Step
- Team Jayco–AlUla
- UAE Team Emirates XRG
- Uno-X Mobility
- Visma–Lease a Bike
- XDS Astana Team

UCI ProTeams

- Burgos Burpellet BH
- Caja Rural–Seguros RGA
- Cofidis
- Pinarello–Q36.5 Pro Cycling Team
- Team TotalEnergies
- Tudor Pro Cycling Team

National Teams

- Oman

== Results ==
Result
Rank	Rider	Team	Time
1	Mauro Schmid (SUI)	Team Jayco–AlUla	4h 14' 36"
2	Adam Yates (GBR)	UAE Team Emirates XRG	+ 0"
3	Luke Plapp (AUS)	Team Jayco–AlUla	+ 4"
4	Christian Scaroni (ITA)	XDS Astana Team	+ 13"
5	Bart Lemmen (NED)	Visma–Lease a Bike	+ 13"
6	Rasmus Tiller (NOR)	Uno-X Mobility	+ 15"
7	Rui Oliveira (POR)	UAE Team Emirates XRG	+ 15"
8	Henok Mulubrhan (ERI)	XDS Astana Team	+ 15"
9	Mauri Vansevenant (BEL)	Soudal–Quick-Step	+ 15"
10	Natnael Tesfatsion (ERI)	Movistar Team	+ 15"
