= 2024 UCI Europe Tour =

Nineteenth season of the UCI Europe Tour

- Twentieth edition of the UCI Europe Tour

Details
- Dates: 20 January – 20 October
- Location: Europe
- Races: 196

The 2024 UCI Europe Tour is the 20th season of the UCI Europe Tour.

Throughout the season, points are being awarded to the top finishers of stages within stage races and the final general classification standings of each of the stages races and one-day events. The quality and complexity of a race also determined how many points were awarded to the top finishers, the higher the UCI rating of a race, the more points were awarded.

The UCI ratings from highest to lowest were as follows:

- Multi-day events: 2.Pro, 2.1 and 2.2
- One-day events: 1.Pro, 1.1 and 1.2

== Events ==
=== January ===
Races in the 2024 UCI Europe Tour
Race	Rating	Date	Winner	Team
(Spain) Clàssica Comunitat Valenciana 1969 – Gran Premi València	1.1	20 January	Dylan Groenewegen (NED)	Team Jayco–AlUla
(Spain) Ruta de la Ceramica – Gran Premio Castellón	1.1	21 January	Michael Matthews (AUS)	Team Jayco–AlUla
(Spain) Trofeo Calvià	1.1	24 January	Simon Carr (GBR)	EF Education–EasyPost
(Spain) Trofeo Ses Salines–Felanitx	1.1	25 January	Paul Magnier (FRA)	Soudal–Quick-Step
(Spain) Trofeo Serra Tramuntana	1.1	26 January	Lennert Van Eetvelt (BEL)	Lotto–Dstny
(Spain) Trofeo Pollença – Port d'Andratx	1.1	27 January	Pelayo Sánchez (ESP)	Movistar Team
(Turkey) Grand Prix Antalya Airport City	1.2	27 January	Binyan Ma (CHN)	China Glory–Mentech Continental Cycling Team
(France) Grand Prix La Marseillaise	1.1	28 January	Kevin Geniets (LUX)	Groupama–FDJ
(Spain) Trofeo Palma	1.1	28 January	Gerben Thijssen (BEL)	Intermarché–Wanty
(France) Étoile de Bessèges – Tour du Gard	2.1	31 January – 4 February	Mads Pedersen (DEN)	Lidl–Trek

=== February ===
Races in the 2024 UCI Europe Tour
Race	Rating	Date	Winner	Team
(Turkey) Grand Prix Apollon Temple	1.2	3 February	Binyan Ma (CHN)	China Glory–Mentech Continental Cycling Team
(Turkey) Tour of Antalya	2.1	8–11 February	Davide Piganzoli (ITA)	Polti–Kometa
(France) Tour de la Provence	2.1	8–11 February	Mads Pedersen (DEN)	Lidl–Trek
(Spain) Vuelta Ciclista a la Region de Murcia "Costa Calida"	1.1	10 February	Ben O'Connor (AUS)	Decathlon–AG2R La Mondiale
(Spain) Clásica Jaén	1.1	12 February	Oier Lazkano (ESP)	Movistar Team
(France) Classic Var	1.1	16 February	Lenny Martinez (FRA)	Groupama–FDJ
(France) Tour des Alpes-Maritimes	2.1	17–18 February	Benoît Cosnefroy (FRA)	Decathlon–AG2R La Mondiale
(Spain) O Gran Camiño – The Historical Route	2.1	22–25 February	Jonas Vingegaard (DEN)	Visma–Lease a Bike
(Turkey) Tour of Alanya	1.2	25 February	Julien Trarieux (FRA)	China Glory–Mentech Continental Cycling Team
(Belgium) Le Samyn	1.1	27 February	Laurenz Rex (BEL)	Intermarché–Wanty
(Croatia) Trofej Umag – Umag Trophy	1.2	28 February	Matthew Brennan (GBR)	Visma–Lease a Bike Development

=== March ===
Races in the 2024 UCI Europe Tour
Race	Rating	Date	Winner	Team
(France) Le Tour des 100 Communes	1.2	2 March	Halvor Dolven (NOR)	Uno-X Mobility Development Team
(Netherlands) Salverda Bouw Ster van Zwolle	1.2	2 March	Nicklas Pedersen (DEN)	TDT–Unibet Cycling Team
(Turkey) Grand Prix Syedra Ancient City	1.2	2 March	Lü Xianjing (CHN)	China Glory–Mentech Continental Cycling Team
(Belgium) Grand Prix Criquielion	1.1	2 March	Alec Segaert (BEL)	Lotto–Dstny
(Greece) Visit South Aegean Islands	2.2	2–3 March	André Drege (NOR)	Team Coop–Repsol
(Croatia) Poreč Trophy	1.2	3 March	Matthew Brennan (GBR)	Visma–Lease a Bike Development
(France) Grand Prix de la Ville de Lillers	1.2	3 March	Emmanuel Morin (FRA)	Van Rysel–Roubaix
(Belgium) Grote Prijs Jean-Pierre Monseré	1.1	3 March	Jarne Van de Paar (BEL)	Lotto–Dstny
(Croatia) Istrian Spring Trophy	2.2	7–10 March	Noa Isidore (FRA)	Decathlon–AG2R La Mondiale Development Team
(Greece) International Rhodes Grand Prix	1.2	9 March	Tyler Stites (USA)	Project Echelon Racing
(Greece) International Tour of Rhodes	2.2	14–17 March	André Drege (NOR)	Team Coop–Repsol
(Belgium) Youngster Coast Challenge	1.2U	15 March	Niklas Behrens (GER)	Lidl–Trek Future Racing
(France) Classic Loire Atlantique	1.1	16 March	Paul Lapeira (FRA)	Decathlon–AG2R La Mondiale
(Italy) Popolarissima	1.2	17 March	Daniel Skerl (ITA)	CTF Victorious
(Slovenia) GP Slovenian Istria	1.2	17 March	Marcin Budziński (POL)	Mazowsze Serce Polski
(Portugal) Clássica da Arrabida	1.2	17 March	Joseba López (ESP)	Caja Rural–Seguros RGA
(France) Cholet Agglo Tour	1.1	17 March	Paul Lapeira (FRA)	Decathlon–AG2R La Mondiale
(Netherlands) Dorpenomloop Rucphen	1.2	17 March	Johan Dorussen (NED)	Development Team DSM–Firmenich PostNL
(Slovenia) GP Brda–Collio	1.2	19 March	Marcin Budziński (POL)	Mazowsze Serce Polski
(Italy) Settimana Internazionale di Coppi e Bartali	2.1	19–23 March	Koen Bouwman (NED)	Visma–Lease a Bike
(Netherlands) Olympia's Tour	2.2	20–24 March	Tim Torn Teutenberg (GER)	Lidl–Trek Future Racing
(Portugal) Volta ao Alentejo	2.2	20–24 March	Eduard Prades (ESP)	Caja Rural–Seguros RGA
(Slovenia) GP Goriska & Vipava Valley	1.2	21 March	Mattia Negrente (ITA)	Astana Qazaqstan Development Team
(France) La Roue Tourangelle	1.1	24 March	Jason Tesson (FRA)	Team TotalEnergies
(Slovenia) GP Adria Mobil	1.2	24 March	Žak Eržen (SLO)	CTF Victorious
(France) Paris–Camembert	1.1	27 March	Benoît Cosnefroy (FRA)	Decathlon–AG2R La Mondiale
(France) La Route Adélie de Vitré	1.1	29 March	Jenthe Biermans (BEL)	Arkéa–B&B Hotels
(Netherlands) Volta NXT Classic	1.1	30 March	Timo Kielich (BEL)	Alpecin–Deceuninck

=== April ===
Races in the 2024 UCI Europe Tour
Race	Rating	Date	Winner	Team
(Italy) Giro del Belvedere	1.2U	1 April	Gal Glivar (SLO)	UAE Team Emirates Gen Z
(Italy) Gran Premio Palio del Recioto	1.2U	2 April	Alessandro Pinarello (ITA)	VF Group–Bardiani–CSF–Faizanè
(France) Région Pays de la Loire Tour	2.1	2–5 April	Marijn van den Berg (NED)	EF Education–EasyPost
(Turkey) Tour of Mersin	2.2	4–7 April	Marcin Budziński (POL)	Mazowsze Serce Polski
(France) Circuit des Ardennes	2.2	4–7 April	Joseph Blackmore (GBR)	Israel–Premier Tech
(France) Paris-Roubaix Espoirs	1.2U	7 April	Tim Torn Teutenberg (GER)	Lidl–Trek Future Racing
(Italy) Trofeo Piva	1.2U	7 April	Pavel Novák (CZE)	Team MBH Bank Colpack Ballan
(Italy) Giro d'Abruzzo	2.1	9–12 April	Alexey Lutsenko (KAZ)	Astana Qazaqstan Team
(France) Tour du Loir et Cher	2.2	10–14 April	Emil Toudal (DEN)	Team ColoQuick
(France) Classic Grand Besançon Doubs	1.1	12 April	Lenny Martinez (FRA)	Groupama–FDJ
(Netherlands) Arno Wallaard Memorial	1.2	13 April	Pete Uptegrove (NED)	Monda Vakantieparken-Ijsselstreek
(France) Tour du Jura Cycliste	1.1	13 April	David Gaudu (FRA)	Groupama–FDJ
(Belgium) Liège–Bastogne–Liège U23	1.2U	13 April	Joseph Blackmore (GBR)	Israel–Premier Tech
(France) Tour du Doubs	1.1	14 April	Lenny Martinez (FRA)	Groupama–FDJ
(Italy) Trofeo Città di San Vendemiano	1.2U	14 April	Florian Samuel Kajamini (ITA)	Team MBH Bank Colpack Ballan
(Bosnia and Herzegovina) Belgrade–Banja Luka	2.2	18–21 April	Piotr Pekala (POL)	Santic–Wibatech
(Italy) Giro della Romagna	1.1	21 April	António Morgado (POR)	UAE Team Emirates
(Italy) Giro della Provincia di Biella	1.2	21 April	Florian Samuel Kajamini (ITA)	Team MBH Bank Colpack Ballan
(Belgium) Gent–Wevelgem U23	1.2U	21 April	Huub Artz (NED)	Wanty–ReUz–Technord
(Italy) Gran Premio della Liberazione	1.2U	25 April	Davide Donati (ITA)	Biesse–Carrera
(France) Le Tour de Bretagne Cycliste	2.2	25 April – 1 May	Jakob Söderqvist (SWE)	Lidl–Trek Future Racing
(Spain) Vuelta Asturias Julio Alvarez Mendo	2.1	26–28 April	Isaac del Toro (MEX)	UAE Team Emirates
(United Kingdom) Rutland–Melton CiCLE Classic	1.2	28 April	The race was cancelled for safety reasons due to flooding across much of the course.	
(Austria) Kirschblütenrennen	1.2	28 April	Lukáš Kubiš (SVK)	Elkov–Kasper
(Belgium) Lotto Famenne Ardenne Classic	1.1	28 April	Arnaud De Lie (BEL)	Lotto–Dstny
(France) Grand Prix de la Somme	1.2	28 April	Corentin Devroute (FRA)	SCO Dijon

=== May ===
Races in the 2024 UCI Europe Tour
Race	Rating	Date	Winner	Team
(Austria) GP Vorarlberg	1.2	1 May	Jaka Primožič (SLO)	Hrinkow Advarics
(Belgium) Omloop van het Waasland	1.2	1 May	Samuel Leroux (FRA)	Van Rysel–Roubaix
(Germany) Eschborn–Frankfurt Under-23	1.2U	1 May	Wessel Mouris (NED)	Metec–Solarwatt p/b Mantel
(France) Ronde de l'Isard	2.2U	1–5 May	Darren van Bekkum (NED)	Visma–Lease a Bike Development
(Portugal) GP Beiras e Serra da Estrela	2.2	2–5 May	Artem Nych	Sabgal–Anicolor
(Norway) Sundvolden GP	1.2	4 May	Idar Andersen (NOR)	Uno-X Mobility Development Team
(Netherlands) Ronde van Overijssel	1.2	4 May	Declan Trezise (AUS)	ARA Skip Capital
(Italy) Circuito del Porto	1.2	5 May	Jakub Mareczko (ITA)	Team Corratec–Vini Fantini
(Belgium) Elfstedenronde	1.1	5 May	Alexander Kristoff (NOR)	Uno-X Mobility
(Norway) Ringerike GP	1.2	5 May	Idar Andersen (NOR)	Uno-X Mobility Development Team
(Luxembourg) Flèche du Sud	2.2	8–12 May	Pim Ronhaar (NED)	Baloise–Trek Lions
(Belgium) Circuit de Wallonie	1.1	9 May	Arnaud De Lie (BEL)	Lotto–Dstny
(Poland) Silesian Classic	1.2	11 May	Jakub Otruba (CZE)	ATT Investments
(France) Tour du Finistère	1.1	11 May	Benoît Cosnefroy (FRA)	Decathlon–AG2R La Mondiale
(Belgium) Flèche Ardennaise	1.2	12 May	Milan Donie (BEL)	Lotto–Dstny Development Team
(France) Boucles de l'Aulne	1.1	12 May	Axel Zingle (FRA)	Cofidis
(Italy) Gran Premio Industrie del Marmo	1.2U	12 May	Tommaso Dati (ITA)	Biesse–Carrera
(Greece) Tour of Hellas	2.1	15–19 May	Riccardo Zoidl (AUT)	Team Felt–Felbermayr
(Turkey) Tour of Sakarya	2.2	16–19 May	Willie Smit (RSA)	China Glory–Mentech Continental Cycling Team
(Netherlands) Veenendaal-Veenendaal Classic	1.1	18 May	Tord Gudmestad (NOR)	Uno-X Mobility
(Slovenia) GP Gorenjska	1.2	19 May	Michal Schuran (CZE)	ATT Investments
(Belgium) Antwerp Port Epic	1.1	19 May	Alexander Kristoff (NOR)	Uno-X Mobility
(Poland) Orlen Nations Grand Prix	2.Ncup	19 May	Mathys Rondel (FRA)	France (national team)
(France) Paris–Troyes	1.2	20 May	Liam Walsh (AUS)	Team BridgeLane
(Belgium) Ronde van Limburg	1.1	20 May	Dylan Groenewegen (NED)	Team Jayco–AlUla
Tour of Albania	2.2	20–24 May	Veljko Stojnić (SRB)	Serbia (national team)
(France) Alpes Isère Tour	2.2	22–26 May	Jarno Widar (BEL)	Lotto–Dstny
Tour of Estonia	2.1	23–25 May	Siim Kiskonen (EST)	Voltas–Tartu 2024 by CCN
(France) Tour de la Mirabelle	2.2	23–26 May	Oscar Nilsson-Julien (FRA)	AVC Aix-en-Provence
(Denmark) Grand Prix Herning	1.2	25 May	Rasmus Søjberg Pedersen (DEN)	Denmark (national team)
(Italy) Due Giorni Marchigiana G.P. Santa Rita	1.2	25 May	Kyrylo Tsarenko (UKR)	Team Corratec–Vini Fantini
(Italy) Due Giorni Marchigiana Trofeo Città di Castelfidardo	1.2	26 May	Francesco Della Lunga (ITA)	Hopplà–Petroli Firenze–Don Camillo
(Netherlands) Omloop der Kempen	1.2	26 May	Martijn Rasenberg (NED)	VolkerWessels Cycling Team
(Germany) Rund um Köln	1.1	26 May	Casper van Uden (NED)	Team dsm–firmenich PostNL
(Denmark) Fyen Rundt	1.2	26 May	Lasse Norman Leth (DEN)	Team CO:PLAY-Giant Store
(France) Mercan'Tour Classic	1.1	29 May	Lenny Martinez (FRA)	Groupama–FDJ
(Poland) Tour of Malopolska	2.2	30 May – 2 June	Riccardo Zoidl (AUT)	Team Felt–Felbermayr
(France) Ronde de l'Oise	2.2	30 May – 2 June	Pierre Barbier (FRA)	Philippe Wagner–Bazin
(Czech Republic) Course de la Paix U23 – Grand Prix Jeseníky	2.Ncup	30 May – 2 June	Brieuc Rolland (FRA)	France (national team)

=== June ===
Races in the 2024 UCI Europe Tour
Race	Rating	Date	Winner	Team
(Belgium) Heylen Vastgoed Heistse Pijl	1.1	1 June	Alexander Kristoff (NOR)	Uno-X Mobility
(Italy) Coppa della Pace	1.2U	2 June	Kevin Pezzo Rosola (ITA)	General Store–Essegibi–Fratelli Curia
Tour of Lithuania	2.2	5–9 June	Mads Andersen (DEN)	Airtox–Carl Ras
(Netherlands) ZLM Tour	2.1	5–9 June	Rune Herregodts (BEL)	Intermarché–Wanty
(Switzerland) Grosser Preis des Kantons Aargau	1.1	7 June	Maxim Van Gils (BEL)	Lotto–Dstny
(Italy) Giro Next Gen	2.2U	9–16 June	Jarno Widar (BEL)	Lotto–Dstny Development Team
(Poland) Tour de Kurpie	2.2	12–16 June	Tobiasz Pawlak (POL)	Mazowsze Serce Polski
(Austria) Oberösterreich Rundfahrt	2.2	13–16 June	Adrien Maire (FRA)	TDT–Unibet Cycling Team
(Poland) Course Cycliste de Solidarnosc et des Champions Olympiques	2.2	26–28 June	Tobiasz Pawlak (POL)	Mazowsze Serce Polski
(Slovakia) Okolo Slovenska	2.1	26–30 June	Mauro Schmid (SUI)	Team Jayco–AlUla
(Netherlands) Midden-Brabant Poort Omloop	1.2	30 June	Floris Van Tricht (BEL)	Israel Premier Tech Academy
(Belgium) SD WORX BW Classic	1.2	30 June	Laurens Sweeck (BEL)	Alpecin–Premier Tech Development Team

=== July ===
Races in the 2024 UCI Europe Tour
Race	Rating	Date	Winner	Team
(Italy) Trofeo Città di Brescia – Mem. Rino Fiori	1.2	2 July	Manuel Oioli (ITA)	Q36.5 Continental Team
Tour of Austria	2.1	2–7 July	Diego Ulissi (ITA)	UAE Team Emirates
(Turkey) GP Yıldızdağı	1.2	6 July	Samet Bulut (TUR)	Istanbul Büyükșehir Belediye Spor Türkiye
(Hungary) Visegrad 4 Kerekparverseny	1.2	6 July	Tilen Finkšt (SLO)	Adria Mobil
(Romania) Sibiu Cycling Tour	2.1	6–9 July	Florian Lipowitz (GER)	Red Bull–Bora–Hansgrohe
Visegrad 4 Bicycle Race – GP Slovakia	1.2	7 July	Martin Voltr (CZE)	Pierre Baguette Cycling
(Italy) Giro del Medio Brenta	1.2	7 July	Sergio Meris (ITA)	Team MBH Bank Colpack Ballan
(Portugal) GP Internacional Torres Vedras – Trofeu Joaquim Agostinho	2.2	11–14 July	Orluis Aular (VEN)	Caja Rural–Seguros RGA
(Turkey) Grand Prix Altinkale	1.2	13 July	Max Stedman (GBR)	Istanbul Büyükșehir Belediye Spor Türkiye
(France) Tour de l'Ain	2.1	13–15 July	Jefferson Alexander Cepeda (ECU)	EF Education–EasyPost
(Italy) Giro dell'Appennino	1.1	14 July	Jan Christen (SUI)	UAE Team Emirates
(Spain) Clásica Terres de l'Ebre	1.2	15 July	Abel Balderstone (ESP)	Caja Rural–Seguros RGA
(Italy) Giro della Valle d'Aosta	2.2U	17–21 July	Jarno Widar (BEL)	Lotto–Dstny Development Team
Visegrad 4 Bicycle Race – GP Czech Republic	1.2	20 July	Martin Voltr (CZE)	Pierre Baguette Cycling
Visegrad 4 Bicycle Race – Grand Prix Poland	1.2	21 July	Lukáš Kubiš (SVK)	Elkov–Kasper
(France) Grand Prix de la ville de Pérenchies	1.2	21 July	Théo Delacroix (FRA)	St. Michel–Mavic–Auber93
(Poland) Memoriał Andrzeja Trochanowskiego	1.2	23 July	Norbert Banaszek (POL)	Mazowsze Serce Polski
(Spain) Vuelta a Castilla y León	1.1	23 July	Caleb Ewan (AUS)	Team Jayco–AlUla
(Poland) Dookoła Mazowsza	2.2	24–27 July	Bartłomiej Proć (POL)	Santic–Wibatech
(France) Tour Alsace	2.2	24–28 July	Joris Delbove (FRA)	St. Michel–Mavic–Auber93
Volta a Portugal em Bicicleta	2.1	24 July – 4 August	Artem Nych	Sabgal–Anicolor
(Spain) Prueba Villafranca – Ordiziako Klasika	1.1	25 July	Jan Christen (SUI)	UAE Team Emirates
(Czech Republic) Czech Tour	2.1	25–28 July	Marc Hirschi (SUI)	UAE Team Emirates
(France) Kreiz Breizh Elites	2.2	27–29 July	Florian Dauphin (FRA)	Arkéa–B&B Hotels (continental team)
(Poland) Puchar MON	1.2	28 July	Konrad Czabok (POL)	Mazowsze Serce Polski

=== August ===
Races in the 2024 UCI Europe Tour
Race	Rating	Date	Winner	Team
(Romania) Cupa Max Ausnit	1.2	4 August	Kyrylo Tsarenko (UKR)	Team Corratec–Vini Fantini
(Romania) Tour of Szeklerland	2.2	7–10 August	Lev Gonov	XDS Astana Development Team
(Spain) Circuito de Getxo – Memorial Hermanos Otxoa	1.1	11 August	Jon Barrenetxea (ESP)	Movistar Team
(France) La Polynormande	1.1	11 August	Paul Lapeira (FRA)	Decathlon–AG2R La Mondiale
(Italy) Gran Premio di Poggiana	1.2U	11 August	Jørgen Nordhagen (NOR)	Visma–Lease a Bike Development
(France) Tour du Limousin	2.1	13–16 August	Alex Baudin (FRA)	Decathlon–AG2R La Mondiale
(Romania) Turul Romaniei	2.1	14–18 August	Davide Toneatti (ITA)	Astana Qazaqstan Development Team
(Belgium) Grote Prijs Jef Scherens	1.1	15 August	Markus Hoelgaard (NOR)	Uno-X Mobility
(Italy) Gran Premio Capodarco	1.2U	16 August	Filippo D'Aiuto (ITA)	General Store–Essegibi–Fratelli Curia
(France) Tour de l'Avenir	2.Ncup	18–24 August	Joseph Blackmore (GBR)	Great Britain (national team)
(France) Tour Poitou-Charentes en Nouvelle-Aquitaine	2.1	20–23 August	Søren Wærenskjold (NOR)	Uno-X Mobility
(Poland) Tour Battle of Warsaw	2.2	21–24 August	Alan Banaszek (POL)	Mazowsze Serce Polski
(Czech Republic) West Bohemia Tour	2.2U	22–25 August	Victor Vaneeckhoutte (BEL)	Lotto-Soudal U23
(Belgium) Druivenkoers - Overijse	1.1	23 August	Jelte Krijnsen (NED)	Q36.5 Pro Cycling Team
(France) Tour Cycliste International de la Guadeloupe	2.2	23 August – 1 September	Kevin Castillo (COL)	Team Sistecredito
(Turkey) Grand Prix Soğanlı	1.2	24 August	Natnael Berhane (ERI)	Istanbul Büyükșehir Belediye Spor Türkiye
Tour of Bulgaria	2.2	24–29 August	Matteo Malucelli (ITA)	JCL Team Ukyo
(France) Grand Prix de Plouay	1.2	25 August	Pierre Henry Basset (FRA)	CIC U Nantes Atlantique
(Netherlands) Ronde van de Achterhoek	1.2	25 August	Stian Rosenlund (DEN)	Airtox–Carl Ras
(Turkey) Grand Prix Kaisareia	1.2	25 August	Ben Dyball (AUS)	Victoire Hiroshima
(Belgium) Muur Classic	1.1	28 August	Jenno Berckmoes (BEL)	Lotto–Dstny
(Turkey) Tour of Routhe Salvation	2.2	30 August – 2 September	Rutger Wouters (GER)	Cycling Vlaanderen
(Bulgaria) In the footsteps of the Romans	2.2	31 August – 1 September	Alin Toader (ROU)	Team Novak

=== September ===
Races in the 2024 UCI Europe Tour
Race	Rating	Date	Winner	Team
(Slovenia) GP Kranj	1.2	1 September	Roman Ermakov	Bahrain Victorious Development Team
(Italy) Giro della Regione Friuli Venezia Giulia	2.2	4–7 September	Jørgen Nordhagen (NOR)	Visma–Lease a Bike Development
(Czech Republic) Okolo Jižních Čech	2.2	5–8 September	Marcin Budziński (POL)	Mazowsze Serce Polski
(Belgium) GP Rik van Looy	1.2	7 September	Simon Dehairs (BEL)	Alpecin–Premier Tech Development Team
(Belgium) Grote Prijs Stad Halle	1.2	8 September	Federico Savino (ITA)	Soudal–Quick-Step Devo Team
(Italy) Giro della Toscana	1.1	11 September	Clément Champoussin (FRA)	Arkéa–B&B Hotels
(Turkey) Tour of İstanbul	2.1	12–15 September	Mathieu Burgaudeau (FRA)	Team TotalEnergies
(Italy) Memorial Marco Pantani	1.1	14 September	Marc Hirschi (SUI)	UAE Team Emirates
(Italy) Trofeo Matteotti	1.1	15 September	Orluis Aular (VEN)	Caja Rural–Seguros RGA
(France) Grand Prix d'Isbergues	1.1	15 September	Arvid de Kleijn (NED)	Tudor Pro Cycling Team
(France) Grand Prix de la ville de Nogent-sur-Oise	1.2	15 September	Justin Ducret (FRA)	SCO Dijon-Team Material-velo.com
(Belgium) Kampioenschap van Vlaanderen	1.1	20 September	Tim Merlier (BEL)	Soudal–Quick-Step
(Belgium) Gooikse Pijl	1.1	22 September	Tim Merlier (BEL)	Soudal–Quick-Step
(France) Paris–Chauny	1.1	22 September	Arnaud Démare (FRA)	Arkéa–B&B Hotels
(Italy) Ruota d'Oro	1.2U	24 September	Roman Ermakov	Bahrain Victorious Development Team
(Belgium) Omloop van het Houtland	1.1	25 September	Max Walscheid (GER)	Team Jayco–AlUla
(France) Tour d'Eure-et-Loir	2.2	27–29 September	Antoine L'Hote (FRA)	Decathlon–CMA CGM Development Team
(Belgium) Grand Prix Cerami	1.2	28 September	Sente Sentjens (BEL)	Alpecin–Premier Tech Development Team

=== October ===
Races in the 2024 UCI Europe Tour
Race	Rating	Date	Winner	Team
(Belgium) Binche–Chimay–Binche	1.1	1 October	Arnaud De Lie (BEL)	Lotto–Dstny
(Italy) Coppa Città di San Daniele	1.2	1 October	Jørgen Nordhagen (NOR)	Visma–Lease a Bike Development
(Croatia) CRO Race	2.1	1–6 October	Brandon McNulty (USA)	UAE Team Emirates
(Netherlands) Visit Friesland Elfsteden Race	1.1	2 October	Taco van der Hoorn (NED)	Intermarché–Wanty
(Italy) Piccolo Giro di Lombardia	1.2U	5 October	Brieuc Rolland (FRA)	Équipe Continentale Groupama–FDJ
(Italy) Coppa Agostoni	1.1	6 October	Marc Hirschi (SUI)	UAE Team Emirates
(France) Paris–Tours Espoirs	1.2U	6 October	Antoine L'Hote (FRA)	Decathlon–AG2R La Mondiale Development Team
(Serbia) Tour de Serbie	2.2	11–13 October	Quinten Veling (NED)	Wielerploeg Groot Amsterdam
(France) Chrono des Nations	1.1	13 October	Stefan Küng (SUI)	Groupama–FDJ
(France) Chrono des Nations Espoirs	1.2U	13 October	Jakob Söderqvist (SWE)	Lidl–Trek Future Racing
