= 2024 Vuelta a Murcia =

2024 UCI Europe Tour

Race details
- Dates: 10 February 2024
- Distance: 198.7 km (123.5 mi)
- Winning time: 4h 50' 59"

Results
	Winner	Ben O'Connor (AUS)	(Decathlon–AG2R La Mondiale)
	Second	Jan Tratnik (SLO)	(Visma–Lease a Bike)
	Third	Tim Wellens (BEL)	(UAE Team Emirates)

The 2024 Vuelta a Murcia was the 44th edition of the Vuelta a Murcia road cycling race. It was held on 10 February 2024 in the titular region of southeastern Spain as a category 1.1 event on the 2024 UCI Europe Tour calendar.

== Teams ==
Nine UCI WorldTeams, nine UCI ProTeams, and one UCI Continental teams made up the nineteen teams that participated in the race.

UCI WorldTeams

- Bora–Hansgrohe
- Cofidis
- Decathlon–AG2R La Mondiale
- Groupama–FDJ
- Ineos Grenadiers
- Intermarché–Wanty
- Movistar Team
- Visma–Lease a Bike
- UAE Team Emirates

UCI ProTeams

- Burgos BH
- Caja Rural–Seguros RGA
- Equipo Kern Pharma
- Euskaltel–Euskadi
- Lotto–Dstny
- Q36.5 Pro Cycling Team
- Team Flanders–Baloise
- Team TotalEnergies
- Tudor Pro Cycling Team

UCI Continental Teams

- Illes Balears Arabay Cycling

== Results ==
Result
Rank	Rider	Team	Time
1	Ben O'Connor (AUS)	Decathlon–AG2R La Mondiale	4h 50' 59"
2	Jan Tratnik (SLO)	Visma–Lease a Bike	+ 58"
3	Tim Wellens (BEL)	UAE Team Emirates	+ 59"
4	Michał Kwiatkowski (POL)	Ineos Grenadiers	+ 1' 27"
5	Valentin Madouas (FRA)	Groupama–FDJ	+ 1' 45"
6	Sergio Higuita (COL)	Bora–Hansgrohe	+ 1' 45"
7	Alessandro Covi (ITA)	UAE Team Emirates	+ 1' 45"
8	Steff Cras (BEL)	Team TotalEnergies	+ 1' 45"
9	Mick van Dijke (NED)	Visma–Lease a Bike	+ 1' 45"
10	Gianluca Brambilla (ITA)	Q36.5 Pro Cycling Team	+ 1' 45"
