= Elliot Rowe =

British cyclist (born 2006)

- Elliot Rowe in 2026

Personal information
- Born: 1 June 2006 (age 20)
- Height: 1.81 m (5 ft 11 in)

Cycling career
- Sport: Cycling
- Current team: Visma–Lease a Bike Development
- Disciplines: Track; Road
- Role: Rider

Amateur teams
- 2023: Anexo Group Race Team
- 2024: Fensham Howes-MAS Design

Professional team
- 2025–: Visma–Lease a Bike Development
Medal record
Representing Great Britain
Men's track cycling
European Under-23 Championships
Gold medal – first place	2025 Anadia	Team pursuit
Bronze medal – third place	2025 Anadia	Points race

Elliot Rowe (born 1 June 2006) is a Scottish road cyclist who rides for UCI Continental team Visma–Lease a Bike Development.

== Career ==
From Scotland, he started cycling as a youngster at Ythan Cycling Club. In July 2022, he won the British National Youth Circuit Championships at the Scarborough Festival of Cycling. That year, he won in Deeside at the National Youth Omnium Series.

Competing for Great Britain he finished fourth in the junior scratch race at the 2023 European Junior & Under 23s Track Championships in Portugal. Riding for Anexo Group RT on the road in 2023 he placed second overall at the Falling Leaves Stage Race in Ballater having won the prologue. He won the silver medal at the 2023 Commonwealth Youth Games in Trinidad and Tobago representing Scotland in the individual time trial.

In 2024, he was runner-up in the time trial at the Scottish National Road Race Championships. Riding for Fensham Howes-Mas Design on the road as a 17-year-old in 2024, he finished fourth in the Trophée Centre Morbihan (Nations Cup) and also finished second in the GP Bob Jungels, sixth in the junior Liège-Bastogne-Liège, and seventh in the junior Kuurne-Brussels-Kuurne race. He signed for the Jumbo–Visma Development Team prior to the 2025 season, agreeing a two-year contract.

He was a gold medalist in the team pursuit in the 2025 European U23 Championships. In June 2025, he finished third in the men's U23 race at the British National Time Trial Championships. The following year, he won the 2026 British U23 road race, placing fourth in the elite men's race.

== Major results ==
=== Road ===
2024
2nd Overall Junior Tour of Wales
4th Overall Trophée Centre Morbihan
7th Overall Grand Prix Rüebliland
2025
1st Stage 2 Tour de l'Avenir
2nd Piccolo Giro di Lombardia
3rd Time trial, National Under-23 Championships
3rd Coppa Città di San Daniele
6th Overall Grand Prix Jeseníky
6th Gran Premio Palio del Recioto
10th Eschborn–Frankfurt Under-23
10th Flèche Ardennaise
2026
1st Road race, National Under-23 Championships
4th Road race, National Championships
4th Flèche Ardennaise
6th Overall Tour of Britain

1st Young rider classification

6th Overall Giro Next Gen
8th Overall Alpes Isère Tour

1st Stage 4

9th Grand Prix Vorarlberg
10th Polynormande

=== Track ===
2025
UEC European Under-23 Championships

1st Team pursuit
3rd Points race
