= 2026 Le Samyn =

2026 UCI Europe Tour
- Official poster with previous winner Mathieu van der Poel

Race details
- Dates: 3 March 2026
- Stages: 1
- Distance: 203.8 km (126.6 mi)
- Winning time: 4h 24' 42"

Results
	Winner	Jordi Meeus (BEL)	(Red Bull–Bora–Hansgrohe)
	Second	Laurenz Rex (BEL)	(Soudal–Quick-Step)
	Third	Hugo Hofstetter (FRA)	(NSN Cycling Team)

The 2026 Le Samyn was the 57th edition of the Le Samyn road cycling one day race in Belgium. It was a 1.1-rated event on the 2026 UCI Europe Tour and the first event in the 2026 Belgian Road Cycling Cup. The 203.8 kilometres (126.6 mi) long race started in Quaregnon and finished in Dour, with almost four laps of a finishing circuit that featured several cobbled sections and climbs.

== Result ==
Result
Rank	Rider	Team	Time
1	Jordi Meeus (BEL)	Red Bull–Bora–Hansgrohe	4h 19' 39"
2	Laurenz Rex (BEL)	Soudal–Quick-Step	+ 0"
3	Hugo Hofstetter (FRA)	NSN Cycling Team	+ 0"
4	Jenthe Biermans (BEL)	Cofidis	+ 0"
5	Lukáš Kubiš (SVK)	Unibet Rose Rockets	+ 0"
6	Matys Grisel (FRA)	Lotto–Groupe Wanty	+ 0"
7	Matevž Govekar (SVN)	Team Bahrain Victorious	+ 0"
8	Florian Sénéchal (FRA)	Alpecin–Premier Tech	+ 0"
9	Florian Dauphin (FRA)	Team TotalEnergies	+ 0"
10	Steffen De Schuyteneer (BEL)	Lotto–Groupe Wanty	+ 0"
