= 2026 Tour of Britain =

2026 UCI ProSeries
- Lewis Askey crosses the finishing line first on stage 1

Race details
- Dates: 2 – 6 September 2026
- Stages: 5

Results
| Jersey awarded to the overall winner | Winner | Tim Wellens (BEL) | (UAE Team Emirates XRG) |
| | Second | Lewis Askey (GBR) | (NSN Cycling Team) |
| | Third | Jasper Stuyven (BEL) | (Soudal–Quick-Step) |
| Jersey awarded to the points classification winner | Points | Filippo Ganna (ITA) | (Netcompany INEOS) |
| Jersey awarded to the mountains classification winner | Mountains | Michal Schuran (CZE) | (Team United Shipping) |
| Jersey awarded to the young rider classification winner | Young rider | Elliot Rowe (GBR) | (Great Britain) |
| Jersey awarded to the combativity classification winner | Combativity | Ben Wiggins (GBR) | (Great Britain) |
| | Team | (United Arab Emirates) UAE Team Emirates XRG | |

The 2026 Tour of Britain was a men's professional road cycling stage race. It was the 85th British tour and the 22nd edition of the modern version of the Tour of Britain. The race was part of the 2026 UCI ProSeries.

For 2026, the race will contract in length to five days from six, becoming equivalent to the women's event. The women's race ran from 19 August to 23 August while the men's race ran from 2 September to 6 September. In March, former rider Jonny Clay was announced as the new race director, taking over from Rod Ellingworth.

== Teams ==
Five UCI WorldTeams, four UCI ProTeams, eight UCI Continental team and one national team make up the eighteen teams, from ten countries in the race.

UCI WorldTeams

- Decathlon CMA CGM
- Netcompany INEOS
- NSN Cycling Team
- Soudal–Quick-Step
- UAE Team Emirates XRG

UCI ProTeams

- Modern Adventure Pro Cycling
- Pinarello–Q36.5 Pro Cycling Team
- Team Flanders–Baloise
- Tudor Pro Cycling Team

UCI Continental Teams

- APS Pro Cycling by Team Cadence Cyclery
- BHS–PL Beton Bornholm
- Bike Aid
- Lucky Sport Cycling Team
- St. Michel–Preference Home–Auber93
- Tarteletto–Isorex
- Team Storck–MRW BAU
- Team United Shipping

National Teams

- Great Britain

== Schedule ==
Stage characteristics and winners
| Stage | Date | Route | Distance | Type | Stage winner |
|---|---|---|---|---|---|
| 1 | 2 September | Lincoln to Lincoln | 187.4 km (116.4 mi) | Flat stage | Lewis Askey (GBR) |
| 2 | 3 September | Boston to Skegness | 184.9 km (114.9 mi) | Flat stage | Tim Merlier (BEL) |
| 3 | 4 September | Hull to Beverley | 202.7 km (126.0 mi) | Flat stage | Olav Kooij (NED) |
| 4 | 5 September | Helmsley to Leyburn | 186.9 km (116.1 mi) | Hilly stage | Cees Bol (NED) |
| 5 | 6 September | Earlston to Earlston | 160.4 km (99.7 mi) | Hilly stage | Nils Politt (GER) |
| Total | | | 886.1 km (550.6 mi) | | |

== Stages ==
=== Stage 1 ===
2 September 2026 – Lincoln to Lincoln, 187.4 km (116.4 mi)

Stage 1 Result
| Rank | Rider | Team | Time |
|---|---|---|---|
| 1 | Lewis Askey (GBR) | NSN Cycling Team | 4h 02' 44" |
| 2 | Filippo Ganna (ITA) | Netcompany INEOS | + 2" |
| 3 | Tim Wellens (BEL) | UAE Team Emirates XRG | + 2" |
| 4 | Jasper Stuyven (BEL) | Soudal–Quick-Step | + 9" |
| 5 | Daan Hoole (NED) | Decathlon CMA CGM | + 9" |
| 6 | Matteo Trentin (ITA) | Tudor Pro Cycling Team | + 9" |
| 7 | Florian Vermeersch (BEL) | UAE Team Emirates XRG | + 11" |
| 8 | Elliot Rowe (GBR) | Great Britain | + 19" |
| 9 | Rick Pluimers (NED) | Tudor Pro Cycling Team | + 19" |
| 10 | Paul Wright (NZL) | Modern Adventure Pro Cycling | + 26" |

General classification after Stage 1
| Rank | Rider | Team | Time |
|---|---|---|---|
| 1 | Lewis Askey (GBR) | NSN Cycling Team | 4h 02' 31" |
| 2 | Filippo Ganna (ITA) | Netcompany INEOS | + 9" |
| 3 | Tim Wellens (BEL) | UAE Team Emirates XRG | + 11" |
| 4 | Daan Hoole (NED) | Decathlon CMA CGM | + 20" |
| 5 | Matteo Trentin (ITA) | Tudor Pro Cycling Team | + 21" |
| 6 | Jasper Stuyven (BEL) | Soudal–Quick-Step | + 22" |
| 7 | Florian Vermeersch (BEL) | UAE Team Emirates XRG | + 24" |
| 8 | Elliot Rowe (GBR) | Great Britain | + 32" |
| 9 | Rick Pluimers (NED) | Tudor Pro Cycling Team | + 32" |
| 10 | Paul Wright (NZL) | Modern Adventure Pro Cycling | + 39" |

=== Stage 2 ===
3 September 2026 – Boston to Skegness, 184.9 km (114.9 mi)

Stage 2 Result
| Rank | Rider | Team | Time |
|---|---|---|---|
| 1 | Tim Merlier (BEL) | Soudal–Quick-Step | 3h 53' 55" |
| 2 | Olav Kooij (NED) | Decathlon CMA CGM | + 0" |
| 3 | Sam Bennett (IRL) | Pinarello–Q36.5 Pro Cycling Team | + 0" |
| 4 | Matteo Moschetti (ITA) | Pinarello–Q36.5 Pro Cycling Team | + 0" |
| 5 | Ethan Vernon (GBR) | NSN Cycling Team | + 0" |
| 6 | Riley Pickrell (CAN) | Modern Adventure Pro Cycling | + 0" |
| 7 | Rick Pluimers (NED) | Tudor Pro Cycling Team | + 0" |
| 8 | Matteo Trentin (ITA) | Tudor Pro Cycling Team | + 0" |
| 9 | Jake Stewart (GBR) | NSN Cycling Team | + 0" |
| 10 | Brody McDonald (USA) | Modern Adventure Pro Cycling | + 0" |

General classification after Stage 2
| Rank | Rider | Team | Time |
|---|---|---|---|
| 1 | Lewis Askey (GBR) | NSN Cycling Team | 7h 56' 25" |
| 2 | Tim Wellens (BEL) | UAE Team Emirates XRG | + 12" |
| 3 | Matteo Trentin (ITA) | Tudor Pro Cycling Team | + 19" |
| 4 | Daan Hoole (NED) | Decathlon CMA CGM | + 21" |
| 5 | Jasper Stuyven (BEL) | Soudal–Quick-Step | + 21" |
| 6 | Florian Vermeersch (BEL) | UAE Team Emirates XRG | + 25" |
| 7 | Rick Pluimers (NED) | Tudor Pro Cycling Team | + 33" |
| 8 | Elliot Rowe (GBR) | Great Britain | + 33" |
| 9 | Paul Wright (NZL) | Modern Adventure Pro Cycling | + 40" |
| 10 | Filippo Ganna (ITA) | Netcompany INEOS | + 1' 53" |

=== Stage 3 ===
4 September 2026 – Hull to Beverley, 202.7 km (126.0 mi)

Stage 3 Result
| Rank | Rider | Team | Time |
|---|---|---|---|
| 1 | Olav Kooij (NED) | Decathlon CMA CGM | 4h 04' 32" |
| 2 | Tim Wellens (BEL) | UAE Team Emirates XRG | + 0" |
| 3 | Axel Källberg (FIN) | Lucky Sport Cycling Team | + 0" |
| 4 | Timothy Dupont (BEL) | Tarteletto–Isorex | + 0" |
| 5 | Matteo Moschetti (ITA) | Pinarello–Q36.5 Pro Cycling Team | + 0" |
| 6 | Arne Santy (BEL) | Tarteletto–Isorex | + 0" |
| 7 | Ethan Vernon (GBR) | NSN Cycling Team | + 0" |
| 8 | Boas Lysgaard (DEN) | BHS–PL Beton Bornholm | + 0" |
| 9 | Axel Bouquet (FRA) | St. Michel–Preference Home–Auber93 | + 0" |
| 10 | Brody McDonald (USA) | Modern Adventure Pro Cycling | + 0" |

General classification after Stage 3
| Rank | Rider | Team | Time |
|---|---|---|---|
| 1 | Lewis Askey (GBR) | NSN Cycling Team | 12h 00' 57" |
| 2 | Tim Wellens (BEL) | UAE Team Emirates XRG | + 12" |
| 3 | Matteo Trentin (ITA) | Tudor Pro Cycling Team | + 19" |
| 4 | Jasper Stuyven (BEL) | Soudal–Quick-Step | + 21" |
| 5 | Daan Hoole (NED) | Decathlon CMA CGM | + 21" |
| 6 | Florian Vermeersch (BEL) | UAE Team Emirates XRG | + 25" |
| 7 | Elliot Rowe (GBR) | Great Britain | + 33" |
| 8 | Rick Pluimers (NED) | Tudor Pro Cycling Team | + 33" |
| 9 | Paul Wright (NZL) | Modern Adventure Pro Cycling | + 40" |
| 10 | Filippo Ganna (ITA) | Netcompany INEOS | + 1' 53" |

=== Stage 4 ===
5 September 2026 – Helmsley to Leyburn, 186.9 km (116.1 mi)

Stage 4 Result
| Rank | Rider | Team | Time |
|---|---|---|---|
| 1 | Cees Bol (NED) | Decathlon CMA CGM | 4h 00' 39" |
| 2 | Tim Wellens (BEL) | UAE Team Emirates XRG | + 3" |
| 3 | Fabio Christen (SUI) | Pinarello–Q36.5 Pro Cycling Team | + 21" |
| 4 | Filippo Ganna (ITA) | Netcompany INEOS | + 30" |
| 5 | Lewis Askey (GBR) | NSN Cycling Team | + 30" |
| 6 | Rick Pluimers (NED) | Tudor Pro Cycling Team | + 30" |
| 7 | Axel Källberg (FIN) | Lucky Sport Cycling Team | + 30" |
| 8 | Matteo Trentin (ITA) | Tudor Pro Cycling Team | + 30" |
| 9 | Elliot Rowe (GBR) | Great Britain | + 30" |
| 10 | Jasper Stuyven (BEL) | Soudal–Quick-Step | + 30" |

General classification after Stage 4
| Rank | Rider | Team | Time |
|---|---|---|---|
| 1 | Tim Wellens (BEL) | UAE Team Emirates XRG | 16h 01' 45" |
| 2 | Lewis Askey (GBR) | NSN Cycling Team | + 21" |
| 3 | Matteo Trentin (ITA) | Tudor Pro Cycling Team | + 40" |
| 4 | Jasper Stuyven (BEL) | Soudal–Quick-Step | + 42" |
| 5 | Daan Hoole (NED) | Decathlon CMA CGM | + 42" |
| 6 | Rick Pluimers (NED) | Tudor Pro Cycling Team | + 54" |
| 7 | Elliot Rowe (GBR) | Great Britain | + 54" |
| 8 | Filippo Ganna (ITA) | Netcompany INEOS | + 2' 14" |
| 9 | Mark Donovan (GBR) | Pinarello–Q36.5 Pro Cycling Team | + 2' 41" |
| 10 | Florian Vermeersch (BEL) | UAE Team Emirates XRG | + 3' 15" |

=== Stage 5 ===
6 September 2026 – Earlston to Earlston, 160.4 km (99.7 mi)

Stage 5 Result
| Rank | Rider | Team | Time |
|---|---|---|---|
| 1 | Nils Politt (GER) | UAE Team Emirates XRG | 3h 33' 28" |
| 2 | Florian Vermeersch (BEL) | UAE Team Emirates XRG | + 12" |
| 3 | Filippo Ganna (ITA) | Netcompany INEOS | + 18" |
| 4 | Benoît Cosnefroy (FRA) | UAE Team Emirates XRG | + 18" |
| 5 | Marcus Sander Hansen (DEN) | BHS–PL Beton Bornholm | + 18" |
| 6 | Ben Wiggins (GBR) | Great Britain | + 18" |
| 7 | Mikkel Bjerg (DEN) | UAE Team Emirates XRG | + 18" |
| 8 | Tim Wellens (BEL) | UAE Team Emirates XRG | + 21" |
| 9 | Rick Pluimers (NED) | Tudor Pro Cycling Team | + 40" |
| 10 | Artem Shmidt (USA) | Netcompany INEOS | + 40" |

Final general classification
| Rank | Rider | Team | Time |
|---|---|---|---|
| 1 | Tim Wellens (BEL) | UAE Team Emirates XRG | 19h 35' 32" |
| 2 | Lewis Askey (GBR) | NSN Cycling Team | + 42" |
| 3 | Jasper Stuyven (BEL) | Soudal–Quick-Step | + 1' 03" |
| 4 | Daan Hoole (NED) | Decathlon CMA CGM | + 1' 03" |
| 5 | Rick Pluimers (NED) | Tudor Pro Cycling Team | + 1' 15" |
| 6 | Elliot Rowe (GBR) | Great Britain | + 1' 15" |
| 7 | Filippo Ganna (ITA) | Netcompany INEOS | + 2' 03" |
| 8 | Florian Vermeersch (BEL) | UAE Team Emirates XRG | + 3' 02" |
| 9 | Mark Donovan (GBR) | Pinarello–Q36.5 Pro Cycling Team | + 3' 04" |
| 10 | Ben Wiggins (GBR) | Great Britain | + 5' 17" |

== Classification leadership table ==
Classification leadership by stage
| Stage | Winner | General classification | Points classification | Mountains classification | Young rider classification | Team classification | Combativity award |
|---|---|---|---|---|---|---|---|
| 1 | Lewis Askey | Lewis Askey | Lewis Askey (Note: On stage 2, Filippo Ganna, who was second in the points classification, wore the red jersey, because first-placed Lewis Askey wore the green jersey as the leader of the general classification. On stage 3, Tim Merlier, who was second in the points classification, wore the red jersey for the same reason.) | Michal Schuran | Elliot Rowe | UAE Team Emirates XRG | Adam Lewis |
| 2 | Tim Merlier | Lewis Askey | Lewis Askey | Michal Schuran | Elliot Rowe | UAE Team Emirates XRG | Jonah Killy |
| 3 | Olav Kooij | Lewis Askey | Lewis Askey | Michal Schuran | Elliot Rowe | UAE Team Emirates XRG | Yorben Lauryssen |
| 4 | Cees Bol | Tim Wellens | Lewis Askey | Michal Schuran | Elliot Rowe | UAE Team Emirates XRG | Tim Wellens |
| 5 | Nils Politt | Tim Wellens | Filippo Ganna | Michal Schuran | Elliot Rowe | UAE Team Emirates XRG | Ben Wiggins |
| Final | | Tim Wellens | Filippo Ganna | Michal Schuran | Elliot Rowe | UAE Team Emirates XRG | Michal Schuran |

Tim Wellens
(general classification)

Filippo Ganna
(points)

Michal Schuran (mountains, combativity)

Elliot Rowe
(young rider)

UAE Team Emirates XRG (team)
