= 2024 UCI Asia Tour =

Sports season

- Twentieth edition of the UCI Asia Tour

Details
- Dates: 22 October 2023 – 14 October 2024
- Location: Asia
- Races: 26

The 2024 UCI Asia Tour was the 20th season of the UCI Asia Tour. The season began on 22 October 2023 with the Hong Kong Cyclothon in Hong Kong and ended on 14 October 2024.

The points leader, based on the cumulative results of previous races, wore the UCI Asia Tour cycling jersey.

Throughout the season, points were awarded to the top finishers of stages within stage races and the final general classification standings of each of the stages races and one-day events. The quality and complexity of a race also determined how many points were awarded to the top finishers, the higher the UCI rating of a race, the more points were awarded.

The UCI race classifications from highest to lowest are as follows:

- Multi-day events: 2.1 and 2.2
- One-day events: 1.1 and 1.2

== Events ==
Races in the 2024 UCI Asia Tour
| Race | Rating | Date | Winner | Team |
|---|---|---|---|---|
| Hong Kong Challenge | 1.1 | 22 October 2023 | Lukas Pöstlberger (AUT) | Team Jayco–AlUla |
| (Japan) Karst International Road Race | 1.2 | 5 November 2023 | Benjamín Prades (ESP) | JCL Team Ukyo |
| (Japan) Tour de Okinawa | 1.2 | 12 November 2023 | Masaki Yamamoto (JPN) | JCL Team Ukyo |
| (United Arab Emirates) Tour of Sharjah | 2.2 | 26–31 January 2024 | Gal Glivar (SLO) | UAE Team Emirates Gen Z |
| (Saudi Arabia) AlUla Tour | 2.1 | 30 January – 3 February 2024 | Simon Yates (GBR) | Team Jayco–AlUla |
| (Oman) Muscat Classic | 1.1 | 9 February 2024 | Finn Fisher-Black (NZL) | UAE Team Emirates |
| (Chinese Taipei) Tour de Taiwan | 2.1 | 10–14 March 2024 | Joseph Blackmore (GBR) | Israel–Premier Tech |
| (Thailand) Bueng Si Fai Road Race | 1.2 | 30 March 2024 | Lucas Carstensen (GER) | Roojai Insurance |
| Tour of Thailand | 2.1 | 1–6 April 2024 | Adne van Engelen (NED) | Roojai Insurance |
| (Japan) Tour de Kumano | 2.2 | 10–12 May 2024 | Atsushi Oka (JPN) | JCL Team Ukyo |
| Tour of Japan | 2.2 | 19–26 May 2024 | Giovanni Carboni (ITA) | JCL Team Ukyo |
| (Uzbekistan) Tour of Bostonliq | 2.2 | 27–29 May 2024 | Batsaikhany Tegshbayar (MGL) | Mongolia (national team) |
| (Indonesia) Tour de Banyuwangi Ijen | 2.2 | 22–25 July 2024 | Merhawi Kudus (ERI) | Terengganu Cycling Team |
| (China) Trans-Himalaya Cycling Race | 2.2 | 23–25 August 2024 | Aaron Gate (NZL) | Burgos BH |
| (China) Tour of Poyang Lake | 2.2 | 3–12 September 2024 | Petr Rikunov | Chengdu DYC Cycling Team |
| (China) Tour of Binzhou | 1.2 | 8 September 2024 | Ilia Schegolkov | DYC & Pardus |
| (Oman) Tour of Salalah | 2.2 | 8–11 September 2024 | Nícolas Sessler (BRA) | Victoria Sports Pro Cycling Team |
| (China) Tour of Huangshan | 2.2 | 26–28 September 2024 | Roman Maikin | Chengdu DYC Cycling Team |
| (Japan) Oita Urban Classic | 1.2 | 29 September 2024 | Jeroen Meijers (NED) | Victoria Sports Pro Cycling Team |
| (Indonesia) Tour de Batam | 1.2 | 5 October 2024 | Kane Richards (AUS) | Roojai Insurance |
| (Japan) Tour de Kyushu | 2.1 | 12–14 October 2024 | Émilien Jeannière (FRA) | Team TotalEnergies |
