= Rick Pluimers =

Dutch cyclist

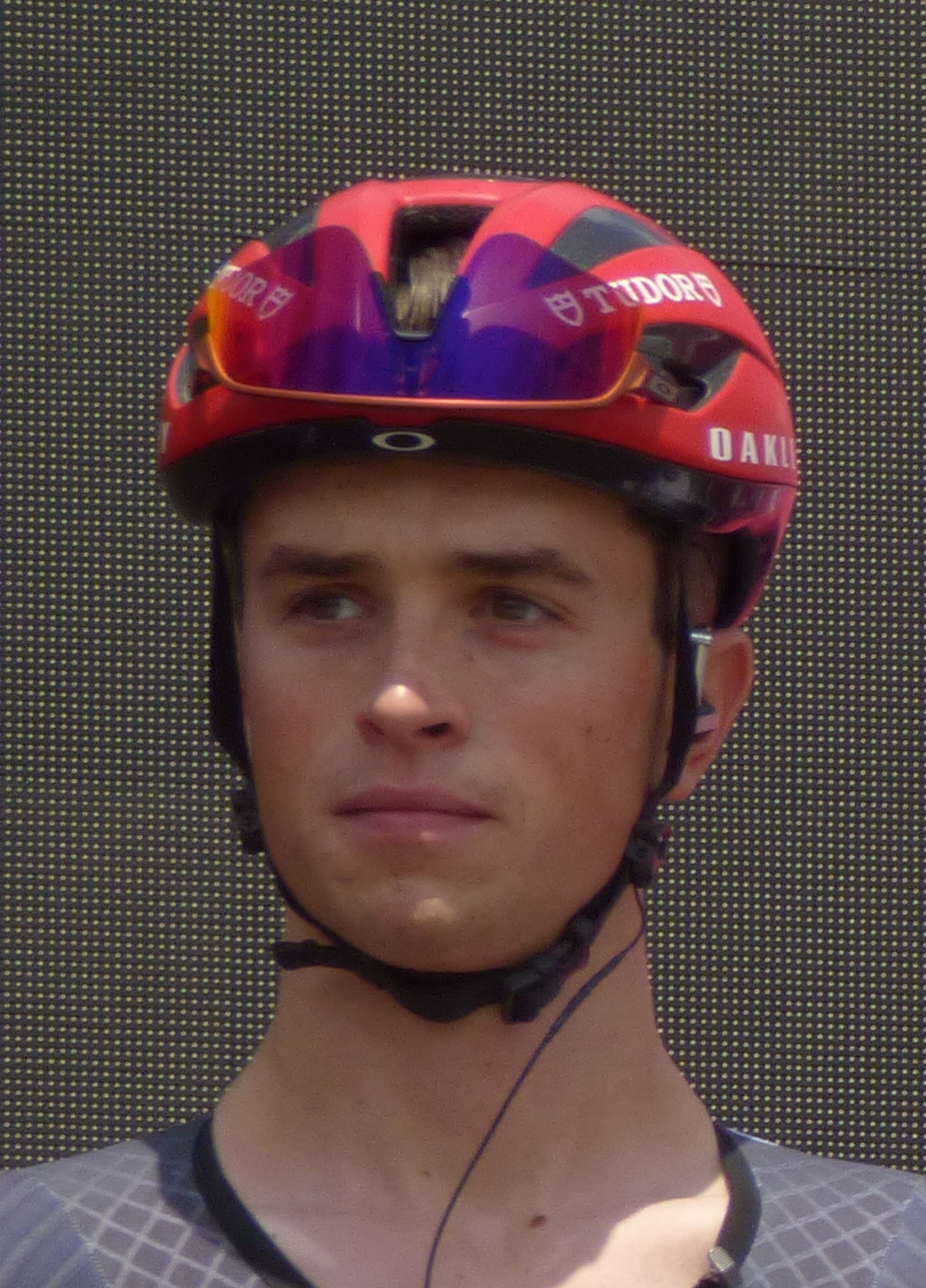
- Pluimers in 2025

Personal information
- Born: 7 December 2000 (age 25) Enter, Netherlands
- Height: 1.79 m (5 ft 10 in)
- Weight: 67 kg (148 lb)

Cycling career
- Sport: Cycling
- Current team: Tudor Pro Cycling Team
- Discipline: Road
- Role: Rider

Professional teams
- 2019: Monkey Town–à Bloc
- 2020–2022: Jumbo–Visma Development Team
- 2023–: Tudor Pro Cycling Team

Rick Pluimers (born 7 December 2000) is a Dutch professional racing cyclist, who currently rides for UCI ProTeam Tudor Pro Cycling Team.

== Major results ==
2017
4th Ronde van Gelderland
7th Overall Junior Cycling Tour Assen

1st Prologue

2018
1st Menen-Kemmel-Menen
1st Stage 4 Tour de Himmelfart Juniors
1st Lus van Roden Juniors
3rd Grand Prix Bob Jungels
6th Overall Grand Prix Général Patton
6th Omloop van Borsele
8th Overall Grand Prix Rüebliland
10th Nokere Koerse Juniors
2019
8th Grand Prix Albert Fauville - Baulet
2020
1st Gravel classification, Tour Bitwa Warszawska 1920
7th Ster van Zwolle
9th Antwerp Port Epic
2021
2nd Liège–Bastogne–Liège Espoirs
5th Overall Tour du Pays de Montbéliard
6th Paris–Troyes
7th Overall Orlen Nations Grand Prix
2022
1st Prologue (TTT) Tour de l'Avenir
6th Visit Friesland Elfsteden Race
10th Ronde van Drenthe
2023
10th Grand Prix de Wallonie
2024
2nd Super 8 Classic
5th Grand Prix de Wallonie
8th Overall AlUla Tour
2025 (1 pro win)
1st Muscat Classic
4th Road race, National Road Championships
5th Kuurne–Brussels–Kuurne
6th Bretagne Classic
2026
3rd Classic Var
4th Road race, National Road Championships
4th Circuit Franco-Belge
5th Overall Tour of Britain
8th Bretagne Classic
8th Binche–Chimay–Binche
