= Muscat Classic =

Race details
- Date: February
- Region: Oman
- Discipline: Road
- Competition: UCI Asia Tour
- Type: One-day race
- Web site: www.tour-of-oman.com/en/muscat-classic

History
- First edition: 2023
- Editions: 4 (as of 2026)
- First winner: Jenthe Biermans (BEL)
- Most wins: No repeat winners
- Most recent: Mauro Schmid (SUI)

The Muscat Classic is a cycling race held annually in and around the capital city of Oman, Muscat. It was created in 2023 and since 2026 has been on the UCI ProSeries calendar. It was previously part of UCI Asia Tour as a category 1.1 event.

== Winners ==
Year	Country	Rider	Team
2023	Belgium	Jenthe Biermans	Arkéa–Samsic
2024	New Zealand	Finn Fisher-Black	UAE Team Emirates
2025	Netherlands	Rick Pluimers	Tudor Pro Cycling Team
2026	Switzerland	Mauro Schmid	Team Jayco–AlUla
