= Aloïs Charrin =

French cyclist

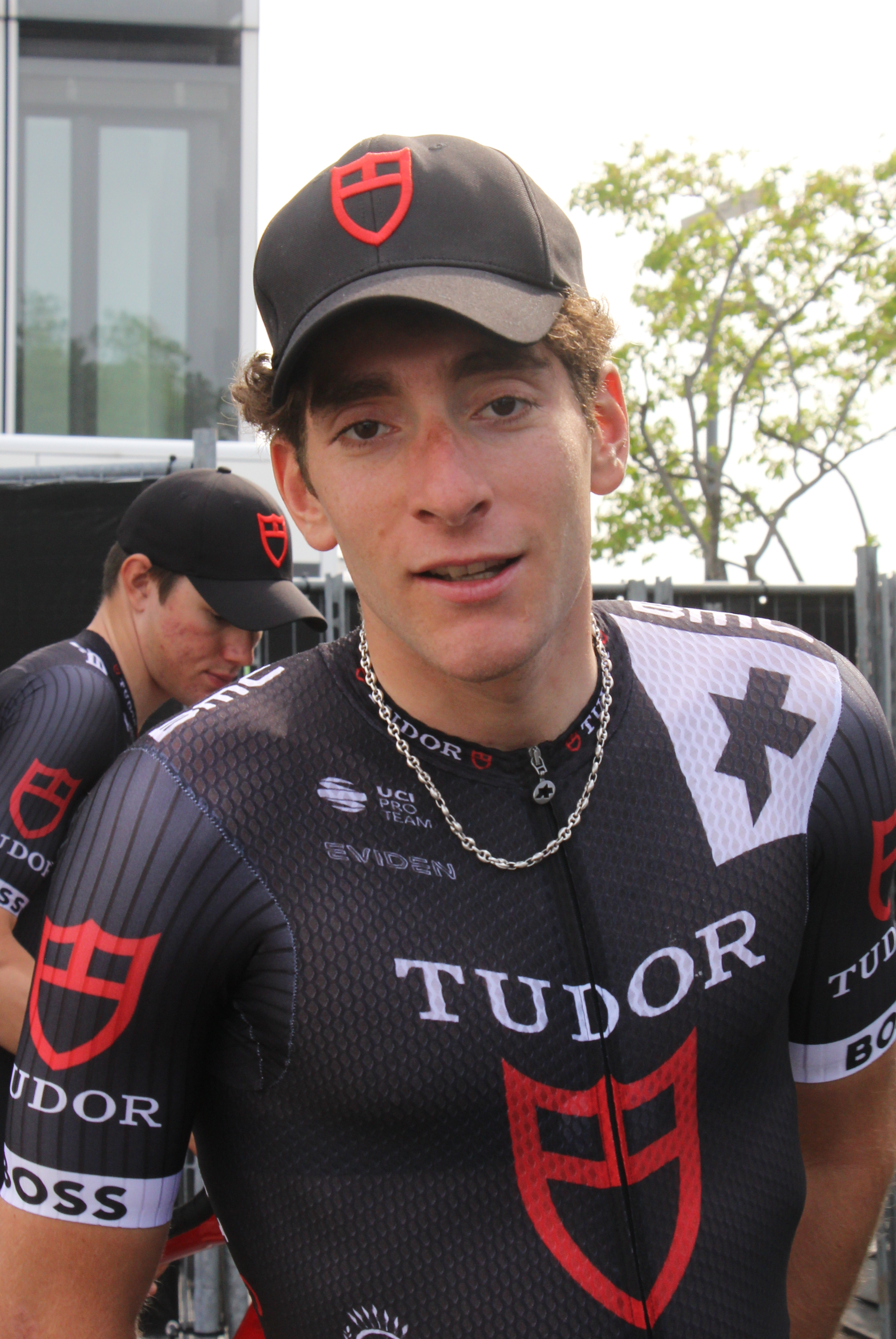
- Charrin in 2023

Personal information
- Born: 8 September 2000 (age 26) Lyon, France
- Height: 1.81 m (5 ft 11 in)
- Weight: 67 kg (148 lb)

Cycling career
- Sport: Cycling
- Current team: Retired
- Discipline: Road
- Role: Rider

Amateur teams
- 2017–2018: BTWIN U19 Racing Team
- 2019–2020: Chambéry CF

Professional team
- 2021–2024: Swiss Racing Academy

Aloïs Charrin (born 8 September 2000) is a French former cyclist, who competed as a professional for UCI ProTeam Tudor Pro Cycling Team from 2021 to 2024.

== Major results ==
=== Road ===
2017
6th Overall Oberösterreich Juniorenrundfahrt

1st Young rider classification

2018
3rd La Classique des Alpes Juniors
8th Road race, UCI World Junior Championships
8th Chrono des Nations Juniors
2021
1st Mountains classification, Ronde de l'Isard
1st Stage 6 Giro Ciclistico d'Italia
2022
4th Liège–Bastogne–Liège U23
8th Overall Istrian Spring Trophy

=== Cyclo-cross ===
2017–2018
3rd Overall Junior Coupe de France

1st Flamanville
3rd Jablines
