= Jenthe Biermans =

Belgian cyclist

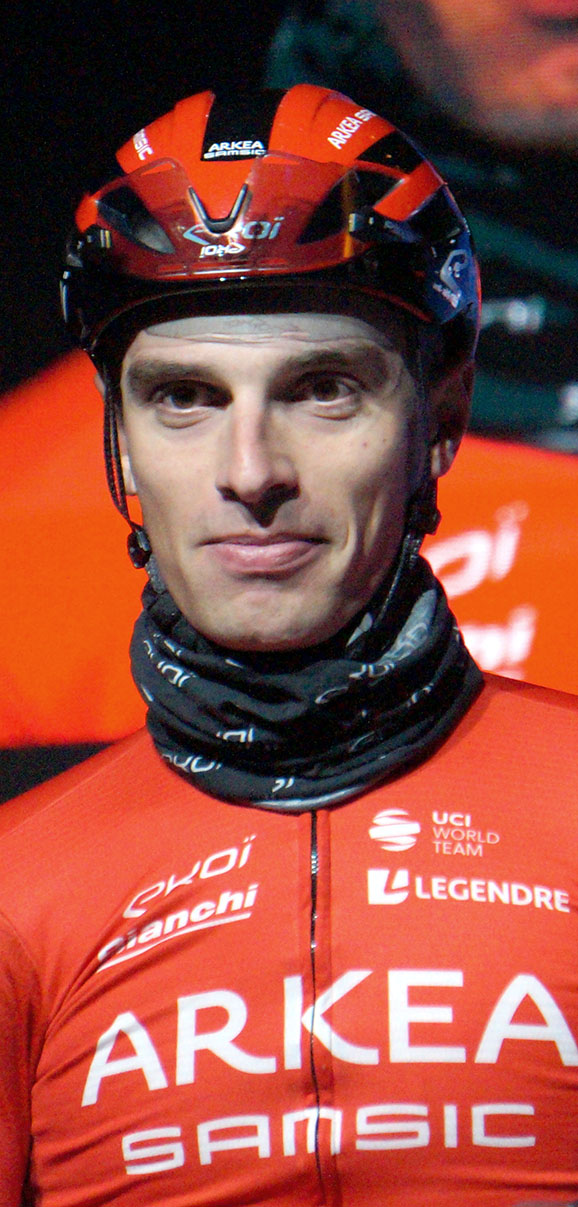
- Biermans in 2023

Personal information
- Full name: Jenthe Biermans
- Born: 30 October 1995 (age 30) Geel, Belgium
- Height: 1.84 m (6 ft 0 in)
- Weight: 78 kg (172 lb)

Cycling career
- Sport: Cycling
- Current team: Arkéa–B&B Hotels
- Discipline: Road
- Role: Rider

Professional teams
- 2014: Development Team Giant–Shimano
- 2015–2016: SEG Racing
- 2017–2019: Team Katusha–Alpecin
- 2020–2022: Israel Start-Up Nation
- 2023–: Arkéa–Samsic

Jenthe Biermans (born 30 October 1995) is a Belgian cyclist, who currently rides for UCI WorldTeam Arkéa–B&B Hotels. In May 2019, he was named in the startlist for the 2019 Giro d'Italia.

== Major results ==
2013
1st Road race, National Junior Road Championships
1st Ronde van Vlaanderen Juniores
2015
2nd Road race, National Under-23 Road Championships
2nd Paris–Roubaix Espoirs
5th Paris–Tours Espoirs
2016
2nd Paris–Roubaix Espoirs
6th Grote Prijs Marcel Kint
10th Overall Kreiz Breizh Elites
2018
9th Overall Tour of Belgium
2019
10th Binche–Chimay–Binche
2020
10th Overall Okolo Slovenska
2021
5th Kuurne–Brussels–Kuurne
2022
5th Tour of Leuven
7th Maryland Cycling Classic
7th Polynormande
2023 (2 pro wins)
1st Muscat Classic
1st Stage 2 Tour de Luxembourg
2nd Clàssica Comunitat Valenciana 1969
4th Druivenkoers Overijse
8th Dwars door het Hageland
2024 (1)
1st Route Adélie de Vitré
3rd Le Samyn
3rd Grand Prix Criquielion
3rd La Roue Tourangelle
3rd Vuelta a Castilla y León
3rd Druivenkoers Overijse
6th Gran Premio Castellón
8th Grote Prijs Jean-Pierre Monseré
2025
2nd Muscat Classic
4th Le Samyn
4th Tour du Finistère
5th La Roue Tourangelle
6th Route Adélie de Vitré
8th Grand Prix Criquielion
10th Gran Premio Castellón
2026
4th Le Samyn
7th Nokere Koerse
8th Grand Prix de Denain

=== Grand Tour general classification results timeline ===
Grand Tour	2019	2020	2021	2022	2023	2024	2025
Giro d'Italia	117	—	—	123	—	DNF	—
Tour de France	—	—	—	—	128	—	—
Vuelta a España	—	—	—	—	—	—	143

Legend
—	Did not compete
DNF	Did not finish
IP	In progress
