= Junior Lecerf =

Belgian cyclist

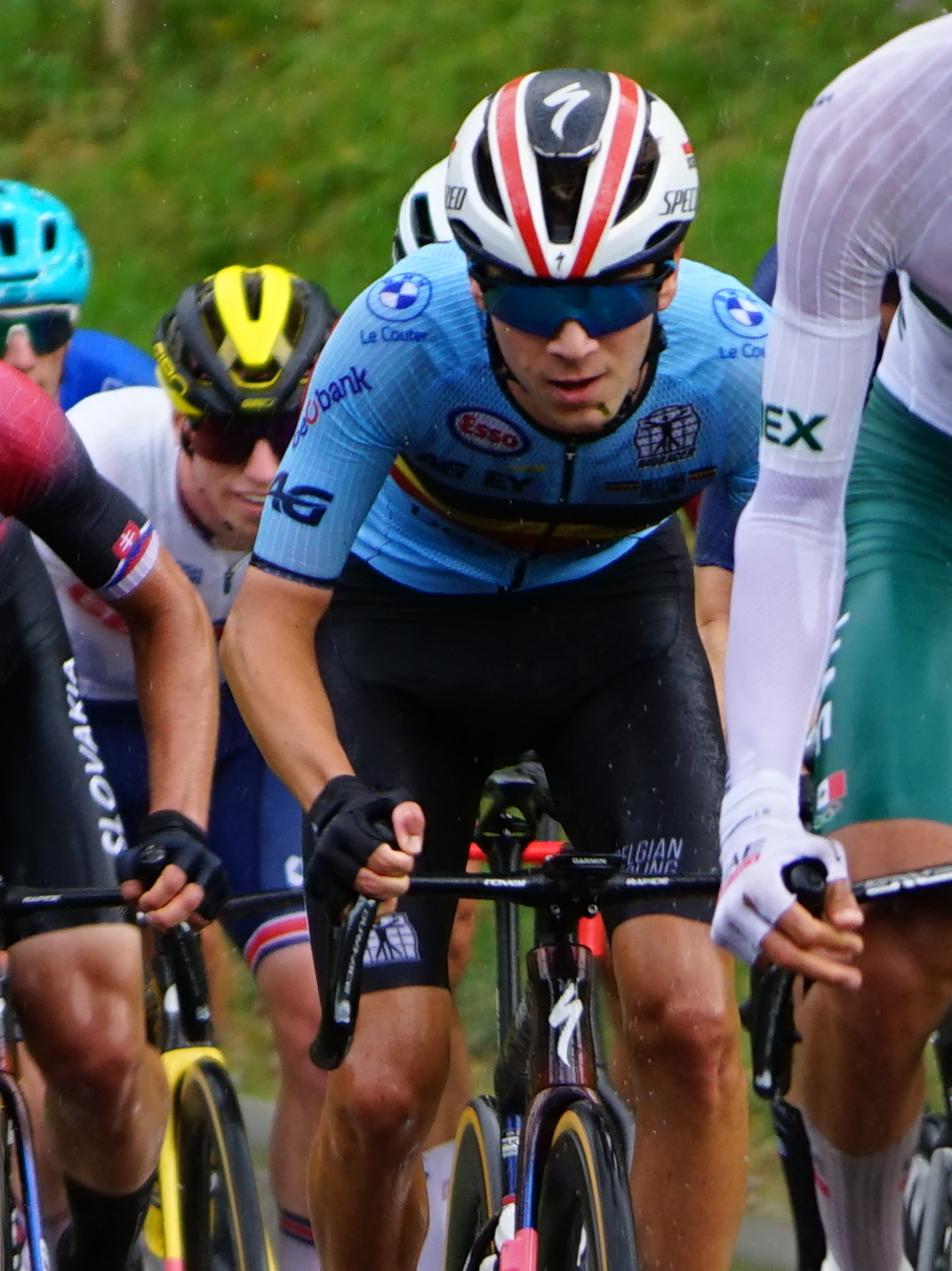
- Lecerf at the 2024 U23 World Championships in Zurich

Personal information
- Full name: Junior Lecerf
- Born: 15 October 2002 (age 24) Halle, Belgium
- Height: 1.70 m (5 ft 7 in)
- Weight: 54 kg (119 lb)

Cycling career
- Sport: Cycling
- Current team: Soudal–Quick-Step
- Discipline: Road
- Role: Rider

Amateur teams
- 2019: Zannata Galloo Cycling Team
- 2020: Acrog–Balen BC Junior
- 2021: CC Étupes
- 2022: Lotto–Soudal U23

Professional teams
- 2023: Soudal–Quick-Step Devo Team
- 2024–: Soudal–Quick-Step

Junior Lecerf (before William Junior Lecerf) (born 15 October 2002) is a Belgian cyclist, who currently rides for UCI WorldTeam Soudal–Quick-Step.

== Major results ==
=== Road ===
2022
4th Overall Giro d'Italia Giovani Under 23
7th Liège–Bastogne–Liège Espoirs
2023
1st Piccolo Giro di Lombardia
3rd Overall Tour du Rwanda
3rd Flèche Ardennaise
4th Overall Tour Alsace
5th Overall Tour de l'Avenir
8th Overall Giro Next Gen
9th Liège–Bastogne–Liège Espoirs
2024 (1 pro win)
1st Stage 4 Tour du Rwanda
2nd Overall AlUla Tour

1st Young rider classification

2025 (2)
1st Overall Czech Tour

1st Points classification
1st Stage 2

8th Overall Tour de Romandie
8th Overall UAE Tour
2026
10th Overall Tour de Romandie

==== Grand Tour general classification results timeline ====
Grand Tour	2024
Giro d'Italia	—
Tour de France	—
Vuelta a España	44

Legend
—	Did not compete
DNF	Did not finish

=== Cyclo-cross ===
2018–2019
1st Junior Pétange
2019–2020
1st Junior Overijse
Junior Ethias Cross

2nd Essen

2nd Junior Gullegem
2nd Junior Pétange
3rd Junior Wachtebeke
