= Laurenz Rex =

Belgian cyclist (born 1999)

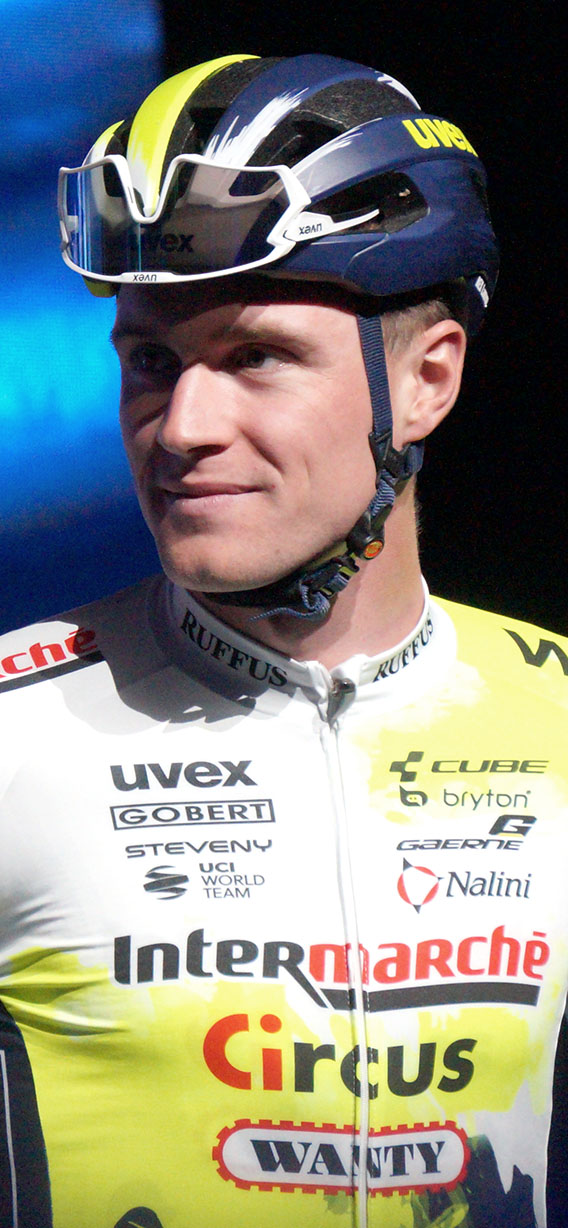
- Rex in 2023

Personal information
- Born: 15 December 1999 (age 26) Marburg, Germany
- Height: 1.93 m (6 ft 4 in)
- Weight: 82 kg (181 lb)

Cycling career
- Sport: Cycling
- Current team: Soudal–Quick-Step
- Discipline: Road
- Role: Rider

Amateur teams
- 2017: Lotto VC Ardennes
- 2018: Crabbé–CC Chevigny
- 2018: AGO–Aqua Service (stagiaire)

Professional teams
- 2019–2020: AGO–Aqua Service
- 2021–2022: Bingoal WB
- 2023–2025: Intermarché–Circus–Wanty
- 2026–: Soudal–Quick-Step

Laurenz Rex (born 15 December 1999) is a Belgian professional cyclist who rides for UCI WorldTeam Soudal–Quick-Step.

His younger brother Tim is also a professional cyclist.

== Major results ==
2017
8th E3 Harelbeke Junioren
2021
8th Druivenkoers Overijse
2022
1st Criterium du Brabant Wallon
10th Brussels Cycling Classic
2023
1st Dorpenomloop Rucphen
9th Paris–Roubaix
Combativity award Stage 11 Giro d'Italia
2024 (1 pro win)
1st Le Samyn
5th Elfstedenronde
6th Omloop Het Nieuwsblad
7th Super 8 Classic
7th Tour of Leuven
2025
4th Antwerp Port Epic
8th Classic Brugge–De Panne
10th Paris–Roubaix
10th Gent–Wevelgem
2026
2nd Le Samyn
6th Kuurne–Brussels–Kuurne
8th Tour of Bruges

=== Grand Tour general classification results timeline ===
Grand Tour	2023	2024
Giro d'Italia	88	—
Tour de France	—	118
Vuelta a España	—	—
