= Hong Kong Cyclothon =

Sports event in Hong Kong

Hong Kong Cyclothon, sponsored by Sun Hung Kai Properties, was held from 10 to 11 October 2015. It was the first time that the Hong Kong Tourism Board organised a mega event related to bicycles. Different competitions within the cyclothon were held to allow participants of different age groups to join. Also, a carnival associated with bicycles was set up. The cyclothon attracted over 3,600 participants, including 100 cyclists coming from 17 countries. The Hong Kong Tourism Board hopes to organise the Hong Kong Cyclothon again.

== Background ==
The Hong Kong Tourism Board, having the duty to promote Hong Kong as a travel destination worldwide and to enhance visitors' experience, would like to organise mega events as a means to make the brand names in Hong Kong internationally recognised. With the successive successes of Hong Kong professional racing cyclists in various international competitions, the Hong Kong Tourism Board found the event fitting. For example, Sarah Lee Wai Sze won the bronze medal in women's keirin at the 2012 London Olympics, and the popularity of cycling as a sport in Hong Kong has been increasing. Hong Kong Tourism Board would thus like to develop cycling as an annual sports event, and to shape Hong Kong as an energetic cosmopolitan city.

== Requirements ==
=== 35 km Challenge Ride /35 km Team Challenge Ride/10 km Community Ride ===
The applicants, who would like to join the 35 km Challenge Ride, 35 km Team Challenge Ride, or 10 km Community Ride, are required to complete the physical fitness test and U-turn test.

=== Children and youth ===
All applicants are required to complete the U-turn test. Applicants under age 11 have to be accompanied and monitored by their parents or guardians throughout the test.

=== Skills test ===
Part 1. Physical Fitness Test: The applicants for 35 km Challenge Ride (including individual and team) must finish the test for 7 km within 20 minutes. The applicants for 10 km Community Ride must finish the test for 2 km within 10 minutes.

Part 2. U-turn Test: All the applicants must finish the 60 m route with a narrow U-turn in 16 seconds without knocking down any obstacles or the foot touching the ground.

=== Exceptions ===
There is an exception for the racing members of The Cycling Association of Hong Kong, China Limited, members of Union Cycliste Internationale(UCI), experienced cyclists in possession of the National Cycling Federation Licence or those provided any certificates to prove that they have completed a cycling race or event before.

"The Organiser reserves the right to reject any applicant who fails to provide valid documents or pass the skills test"

== Routes ==
International Criterium Race, Women's Open Race, Men's Open Race and CEO Charity Ride took place in Tsim Sha Tsui. The race track circulated along Mody Road and Salisbury Road.

35 km Challenge Ride and 35 km Team Challenge Ride started from Hong Kong Cultural Centre to Ma Wan and then returned to the starting point in Tsim Sha Tsui.

10 km Community Ride started from Hong Kong Cultural Centre to Nam Cheong station and then returned to the starting point in Tsim Sha Tsui.

Kids and Youth Rides circulated along Salisbury Road.

== Winners ==
Roman Van Uden from New Zealand won the International Criterium race. Cheung Fu Shiu won the Men's Open race while Michelle Tse won the Women's Open race.

== Injury ==
Five participants had minor injuries and were admitted to the hospital.

== Road closures and traffic diversions ==
Hung Hom bypass and Tsim Sha Tsui East were closed at 4 pm on 10 October 2015. 15 bus routes and 2 green minibus routes were diverted on 10 October 2015. Different locations in Tsim Sha Tsui, Kowloon West and New Territories South were closed from 1 am on 11 October 2015. 110 bus routes and 11 green minibus routes were diverted.

== Special arrangements for participants ==
There were checkpoints in specific routes. If the participants could not pass the checkpoints within the assigned time slot, they would be told to leave the route and sent back to Tsim Sha Tsui. It was used to ensure the routes can be unsealed on time.

== Criticism ==
=== Overlapping routes ===
Since the starting time of 10 km ride was delayed, participants of 10 km ride clashed with participants of 35 km ride near Lantau Link, where both competitions shared the same road. Competitors of 35 km ride were forced to stop moving forward for 10 minutes at the return point.

=== Poor arrangements ===
Four criticisms of the arrangements have been forwarded. First, the private car which led participants stopped at the centre of the street, making some participants to stumble. Second, the starting time was delayed while competitors arrived half an hour before. Third, the participants needed to wait for an hour to get souvenirs. Lastly, no helpers were on duty at the end point, making some competitors to ride for more than once in the circular path.

=== Poor PR and post-event management ===
Only 8 photos have been posted to the HKTB website of this event. Subsequent enquiries sent after Oct 2015 are not answered (hongkongcyclothon@hktb.com and 2508 0068) regarding certificates and photos.
