= Mauro Schmid =

Swiss cyclist (born 1999)

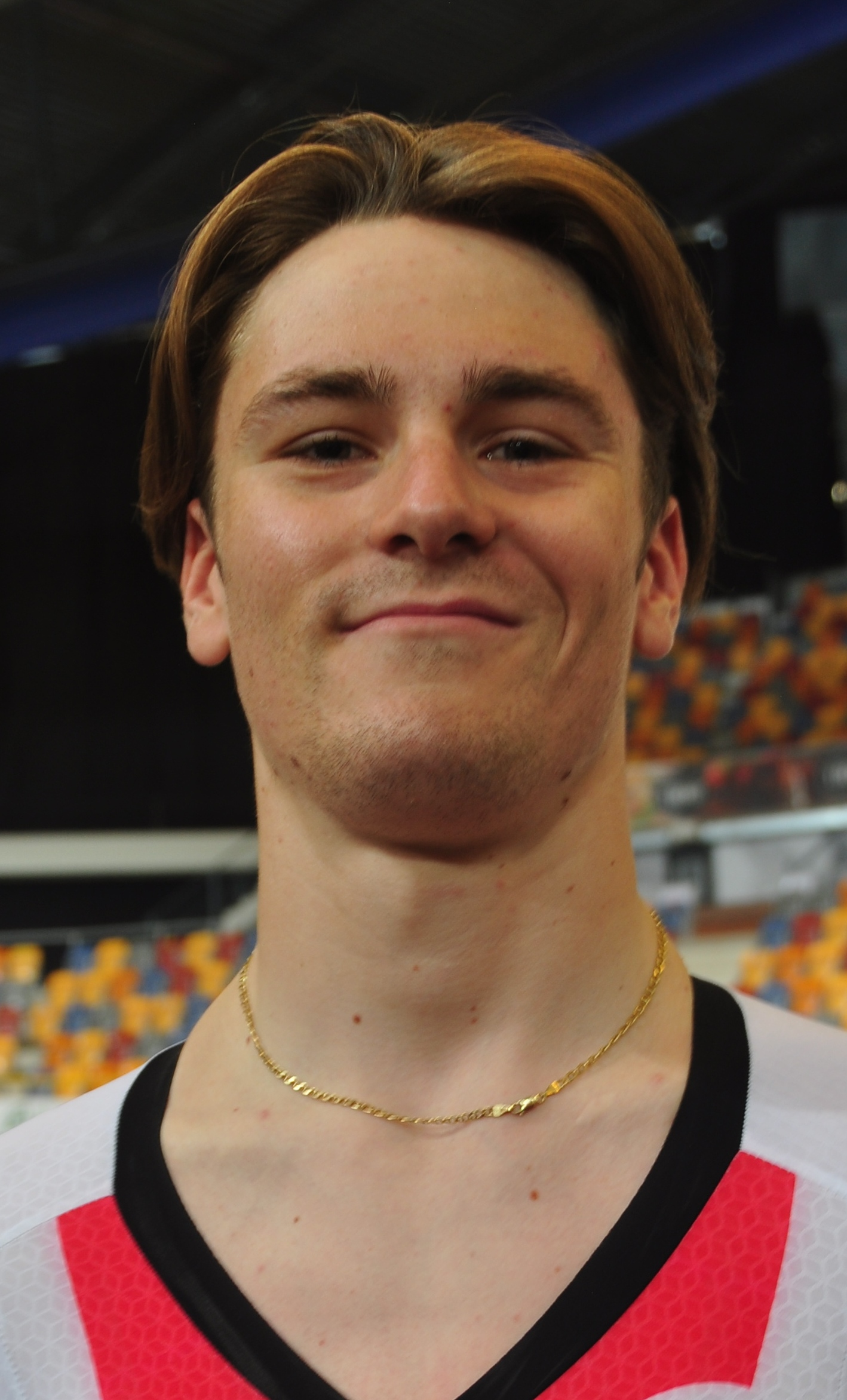
- Schmid in 2021

Personal information
- Born: 4 December 1999 (age 26) Bülach, Switzerland
- Height: 1.87 m (6 ft 2 in)
- Weight: 70 kg (154 lb)

Cycling career
- Sport: Cycling
- Current team: Team Jayco–AlUla
- Disciplines: Road; Track; Cyclo-cross
- Role: Rider
- Rider type: Puncheur, Classics specialist

Amateur teams
- 2016–2017: VC Steinmaur
- 2018: Akros–Renfer SA Development

Professional teams
- 2019: Swiss Racing Academy
- 2020: Leopard Pro Cycling
- 2021: Team Qhubeka Assos
- 2022–2023: Quick-Step Alpha Vinyl Team
- 2024–: Team Jayco–AlUla

Major wins
- Grand Tours Tour de France 1 individual stage (2026) Giro d'Italia 1 individual stage (2021) Stage races Tour of Belgium (2022) One-day races and Classics National Road Race Championships (2024, 2025) National Time Trial Championships (2025) Great Ocean Road Race (2025) Muscat Classic (2026)
Medal record
Men's road bicycle racing
Representing Switzerland
World Championships
Gold medal – first place	2022 Wollongong	Mixed team relay
Gold medal – first place	2023 Glasgow	Mixed team relay
Bronze medal – third place	2025 Kigali	Mixed team relay
European Championships
Bronze medal – third place	2025 Guilherand-Granges	Mixed team relay

Mauro Schmid (born 4 December 1999 in Bülach) is a Swiss cyclist, who currently rides for UCI WorldTeam Team Jayco–AlUla. He competed in the scratch at the 2019 UCI Track Cycling World Championships, where he finished 7th.

== Major results ==
=== Road ===
2017
National Junior Championships

2nd Road race
2nd Time trial

3rd Overall GP Général Patton
2018
2nd Overall Tour of Black Sea
2019
National Under-23 Championships

1st Road race
3rd Time trial

2020
4th Time trial, National Under-23 Championships
2021 (1 pro win)
1st Stage 11 Giro d'Italia
4th Time trial, National Championships
2022 (2)
1st Team relay, UCI World Championships
1st Overall Tour of Belgium
1st Stage 1 Settimana Internazionale di Coppi e Bartali
National Championships

2nd Time trial
4th Road race

6th Overall Danmark Rundt
6th Grand Prix Cycliste de Montréal
10th Overall Tour of Oman
2023 (1)
1st Team relay, UCI World Championships
1st Overall Settimana Internazionale di Coppi e Bartali

1st Points classification

1st Stage 2 (TTT) UAE Tour
4th Road race, National Championships
5th Overall Tour Down Under
10th Overall Tour de Wallonie
2024 (2)
National Championships

1st Road race
5th Time trial

1st Overall Okolo Slovenska

1st Stage 1 (TTT)

4th Overall Arctic Race of Norway
2025 (3)
National Championships

1st Time trial
1st Road race

1st Cadel Evans Great Ocean Road Race
3rd Team relay, UCI World Championships
4th GP Gippingen
5th Maryland Cycling Classic
10th La Flèche Wallonne
2026 (5)
1st Overall Settimana Internazionale di Coppi e Bartali

1st Points classification
1st Stage 5

1st Muscat Classic
1st Stage 13 Tour de France
2nd Overall Tour Down Under
2nd La Flèche Wallonne
2nd NXT Classic
3rd Team relay, UCI Road World Championships
4th Overall Tour of Oman

1st Stage 3

4th Cadel Evans Great Ocean Road Race
4th Coppa Agostoni
6th Amstel Gold Race

==== Grand Tour general classification results timeline ====
Grand Tour	2021	2022	2023	2024	2025	2026
Giro d'Italia	93	75	—	—	—	—
Tour de France	—	—	—	—	101	35
Vuelta a España	—	—	—	71	—	—

Legend
—	Did not compete
DNF	Did not finish

=== Track ===
2017
UEC European Junior Championships

3rd Points race
3rd Team pursuit

2018
3rd Individual pursuit, National Championships
2019
UEC European Under-23 Championships

3rd Team pursuit
3rd Madison (with Robin Froidevaux)

2020
UCI World Cup

1st Team pursuit, Cambridge
3rd Team pursuit, Brisbane

=== Cyclo-cross ===
2015–2016
2nd National Junior Championships
2016–2017
2nd National Junior Championships
3rd Junior Fae' di Oderzo
