= 2024 AlUla Tour =

Saudi Arabian cycling race

2024 UCI Asia Tour, race 5 of 26

Race details
- Dates: 30 January – 3 February 2024
- Stages: 5
- Distance: 812.5 km (504.9 mi)
- Winning time: 18h 37' 05"

Results
Jersey awarded to the overall winner	Winner	Simon Yates (GBR)	(Team Jayco–AlUla)
	Second	William Junior Lecerf (BEL)	(Soudal–Quick-Step)
	Third	Finn Fisher-Black (NZL)	(UAE Team Emirates)
Jersey awarded to the points classification winner	Points	Tim Merlier (BEL)	(Soudal–Quick-Step)
Jersey awarded to the youth classification winner	Youth	William Junior Lecerf (BEL)	(Soudal–Quick-Step)
Jersey awarded to the sprints classification winner	Sprints	Atsushi Oka (JPN)	(JCL Team Ukyo)
	Team	(Germany) Bora–Hansgrohe	

The 2024 AlUla Tour was a road cycling stage race that took place between 30 January and 3 February 2024 in Saudi Arabia. The race was rated as a category 2.1 event on the 2024 UCI Asia Tour calendar and was the eighth edition of the Saudi Tour.

== Teams ==
Eighteen teams entered the race, which included nine UCI WorldTeams, five UCI ProTeams, three UCI Continental teams and the Saudi Arabian National Team. All teams entered a full squad of seven riders, with the exception of Bora–Hansgrohe, who only entered five. In total, 111 riders started the race.

UCI WorldTeams

- Astana Qazaqstan Team
- Team Bahrain Victorious
- Bora–Hansgrohe
- Cofidis
- Movistar Team
- Team dsm–firmenich PostNL
- Team Jayco–AlUla
- Soudal–Quick-Step
- UAE Team Emirates

UCI ProTeams

- Euskaltel–Euskadi
- Q36.5 Pro Cycling Team
- Team TotalEnergies
- Tudor Pro Cycling Team
- Uno-X Mobility

UCI Continental Teams

- JCL Team Ukyo
- Roojai Insurance
- Terengganu Cycling Team

National team

- Saudi Arabia

== Route ==
Stage characteristics and winners
Stage	Date	Course	Distance	Type	Stage winner
1	30 January	Al Manshiyah Train Station to Al Manshiyah Train Station	149.5 km (92.9 mi)	Flat stage	Casper van Uden (NED)
2	31 January	Winter Park to Sharaan Natural Reserve	199.5 km (124.0 mi)	Hilly stage	Søren Wærenskjold (NOR)
3	1 February	Alula Airport to Camel Cup Track	170.5 km (105.9 mi)	Flat stage	Tim Merlier (BEL)
4	2 February	Hegra to Maraya	142.5 km (88.5 mi)	Hilly stage	Tim Merlier (BEL)
5	3 February	Al Ula Old Town to Skyviews of Harrat Uwayrid	150.5 km (93.5 mi)	Flat stage	Simon Yates (GBR)
Total			812.5 km (504.9 mi)		

== Stages ==
=== Stage 1 ===
30 January 2024 — Al Manshiyah Train Station to Al Manshiyah Train Station, 149.5 km (92.9 mi)

Stage 1 Result (1–10)
Rank	Rider	Team	Time
1	Casper van Uden (NED)	Team dsm–firmenich PostNL	3h 18' 55"
2	Dylan Groenewegen (NED)	Team Jayco–AlUla	+ 0"
3	Tim Merlier (BEL)	Soudal–Quick-Step	+ 0"
4	Søren Wærenskjold (NOR)	Uno-X Mobility	+ 0"
5	Dušan Rajović (SRB)	Team Bahrain Victorious	+ 0"
6	Arvid de Kleijn (NED)	Tudor Pro Cycling Team	+ 0"
7	Matteo Malucelli (ITA)	JCL Team Ukyo	+ 0"
8	Juan Sebastián Molano (COL)	UAE Team Emirates	+ 0"
9	Gleb Syritsa	Astana Qazaqstan Team	+ 0"
10	Davide Cimolai (ITA)	Movistar Team	+ 0"

General classification after Stage 1 (1–10)
Rank	Rider	Team	Time
1	Casper van Uden (NED)	Team dsm–firmenich PostNL	3h 18' 45"
2	Dylan Groenewegen (NED)	Team Jayco–AlUla	+ 4"
3	Tim Merlier (BEL)	Soudal–Quick-Step	+ 6"
4	Matteo Sobrero (ITA)	Bora–Hansgrohe	+ 7"
5	Fred Wright (GBR)	Team Bahrain Victorious	+ 8"
6	Fredrik Dversnes (NOR)	Uno-X Mobility	+ 9"
7	Søren Wærenskjold (NOR)	Uno-X Mobility	+ 10"
8	Dušan Rajović (SRB)	Team Bahrain Victorious	+ 10"
9	Arvid de Kleijn (NED)	Tudor Pro Cycling Team	+ 10"
10	Matteo Malucelli (ITA)	JCL Team Ukyo	+ 10"

=== Stage 2 ===
31 January 2024 — Winter Park to Sharaan Natural Reserve, 199.5 km (124.0 mi)

Stage 2 Result (1–10)
Rank	Rider	Team	Time
1	Søren Wærenskjold (NOR)	Uno-X Mobility	4h 42' 04"
2	Henok Mulubrhan (ERI)	Astana Qazaqstan Team	+ 0"
3	Nils Eekhoff (NED)	Team dsm–firmenich PostNL	+ 0"
4	Bryan Coquard (FRA)	Cofidis	+ 0"
5	Jordi Warlop (BEL)	Soudal–Quick-Step	+ 0"
6	Casper van Uden (NED)	Team dsm–firmenich PostNL	+ 0"
7	Rick Pluimers (NED)	Tudor Pro Cycling Team	+ 0"
8	Maikel Zijlaard (NED)	Tudor Pro Cycling Team	+ 2"
9	Pierre Latour (FRA)	Team TotalEnergies	+ 2"
10	Iván Romeo (ESP)	Movistar Team	+ 2"

General classification after Stage 2 (1–10)
Rank	Rider	Team	Time
1	Søren Wærenskjold (NOR)	Uno-X Mobility	8h 00' 49"
2	Casper van Uden (NED)	Team dsm–firmenich PostNL	+ 0"
3	Henok Mulubrhan (ERI)	Astana Qazaqstan Team	+ 4"
4	Nils Eekhoff (NED)	Team dsm–firmenich PostNL	+ 6"
5	Tim Merlier (BEL)	Soudal–Quick-Step	+ 8"
6	Matteo Sobrero (ITA)	Bora–Hansgrohe	+ 9"
7	Xabier Azparren (ESP)	Euskaltel–Euskadi	+ 9"
8	Bryan Coquard (FRA)	Cofidis	+ 10"
9	Rick Pluimers (NED)	Tudor Pro Cycling Team	+ 10"
10	Anders Halland Johannessen (NOR)	Uno-X Mobility	+ 10"

=== Stage 3 ===
1 February 2024 — AlUla International Airport to Camel Cup Track, 170.5 km (105.9 mi)

Stage 3 Result (1–10)
Rank	Rider	Team	Time
1	Tim Merlier (BEL)	Soudal–Quick-Step	3h 59' 52"
2	Arvid de Kleijn (NED)	Tudor Pro Cycling Team	+ 0"
3	Casper van Uden (NED)	Team dsm–firmenich PostNL	+ 0"
4	Luka Mezgec (SLO)	Team Jayco–AlUla	+ 0"
5	Juan Sebastián Molano (COL)	UAE Team Emirates	+ 0"
6	Dušan Rajović (SRB)	Team Bahrain Victorious	+ 0"
7	Rui Oliveira (POR)	UAE Team Emirates	+ 0"
8	Bryan Coquard (FRA)	Cofidis	+ 0"
9	Lucas Hamilton (AUS)	Team Jayco–AlUla	+ 0"
10	Gleb Syritsa	Astana Qazaqstan Team	+ 0"

General classification after Stage 3 (1–10)
Rank	Rider	Team	Time
1	Casper van Uden (NED)	Team dsm–firmenich PostNL	12h 00' 37"
2	Tim Merlier (BEL)	Soudal–Quick-Step	+ 2"
3	Matteo Sobrero (ITA)	Bora–Hansgrohe	+ 10"
4	Nils Eekhoff (NED)	Team dsm–firmenich PostNL	+ 10"
5	Bryan Coquard (FRA)	Cofidis	+ 12"
6	Rick Pluimers (NED)	Tudor Pro Cycling Team	+ 14"
7	Fred Wright (GBR)	Team Bahrain Victorious	+ 14"
8	Finn Fisher-Black (NZL)	UAE Team Emirates	+ 15"
9	Merhawi Kudus (ERI)	Terengganu Cycling Team	+ 16"
10	Gianluca Brambilla (ITA)	Q36.5 Pro Cycling Team	+ 16"

=== Stage 4 ===
2 February 2024 — Hegra to Maraya, 142.5 km (88.5 mi)

Stage 4 Result (1–10)
Rank	Rider	Team	Time
1	Tim Merlier (BEL)	Soudal–Quick-Step	3h 11' 43"
2	Bryan Coquard (FRA)	Cofidis	+ 0"
3	Casper van Uden (NED)	Team dsm–firmenich PostNL	+ 0"
4	Rick Pluimers (NED)	Tudor Pro Cycling Team	+ 0"
5	Luka Mezgec (SLO)	Team Jayco–AlUla	+ 0"
6	Matteo Moschetti (ITA)	Q36.5 Pro Cycling Team	+ 0"
7	Davide Cimolai (ITA)	Movistar Team	+ 3"
8	Søren Wærenskjold (NOR)	Uno-X Mobility	+ 3"
9	Rui Oliveira (POR)	UAE Team Emirates	+ 3"
10	Emilien Jeannière (FRA)	Team TotalEnergies	+ 3"

General classification after Stage 4 (1–10)
Rank	Rider	Team	Time
1	Tim Merlier (BEL)	Soudal–Quick-Step	15h 12' 12"
2	Casper van Uden (NED)	Team dsm–firmenich PostNL	+ 4"
3	Bryan Coquard (FRA)	Cofidis	+ 14"
4	Matteo Sobrero (ITA)	Bora–Hansgrohe	+ 21"
5	Rick Pluimers (NED)	Tudor Pro Cycling Team	+ 22"
6	Luka Mezgec (SLO)	Team Jayco–AlUla	+ 24"
7	Finn Fisher-Black (NZL)	UAE Team Emirates	+ 26"
8	Merhawi Kudus (ERI)	Terengganu Cycling Team	+ 27"
9	Gianluca Brambilla (ITA)	Q36.5 Pro Cycling Team	+ 27"
10	Davide Formolo (ITA)	Movistar Team	+ 27"

=== Stage 5 ===
3 February 2024 — Al Ula Old Town to Skyviews of Harrat Uwayrid, 150.5 km (93.5 mi)

Stage 5 Result (1–10)
Rank	Rider	Team	Time
1	Simon Yates (GBR)	Team Jayco–AlUla	3h 24' 37"
2	William Junior Lecerf (BEL)	Soudal–Quick-Step	+ 0"
3	Finn Fisher-Black (NZL)	UAE Team Emirates	+ 0"
4	Rafał Majka (POL)	UAE Team Emirates	+ 2"
5	Pierre Latour (FRA)	Team TotalEnergies	+ 5"
6	Anders Halland Johannessen (NOR)	Uno-X Mobility	+ 5"
7	Gianluca Brambilla (ITA)	Q36.5 Pro Cycling Team	+ 7"
8	Matteo Sobrero (ITA)	Bora–Hansgrohe	+ 7"
9	Davide Formolo (ITA)	Movistar Team	+ 11"
10	Iván Romeo (ESP)	Movistar Team	+ 29"

General classification after Stage 5 (1–10)
Rank	Rider	Team	Time
1	Simon Yates (GBR)	Team Jayco–AlUla	18h 37' 05"
2	William Junior Lecerf (BEL)	Soudal–Quick-Step	+ 3"
3	Finn Fisher-Black (NZL)	UAE Team Emirates	+ 3"
4	Matteo Sobrero (ITA)	Bora–Hansgrohe	+ 12"
5	Gianluca Brambilla (ITA)	Q36.5 Pro Cycling Team	+ 18"
6	Davide Formolo (ITA)	Movistar Team	+ 22"
7	Bryan Coquard (FRA)	Cofidis	+ 32"
8	Rick Pluimers (NED)	Tudor Pro Cycling Team	+ 40"
9	Iván Romeo (ESP)	Movistar Team	+ 40"
10	Merhawi Kudus (ERI)	Terengganu Cycling Team	+ 45"

== Classification leadership table ==
Classification leadership by stage
Stage	Winner	General classification	Points classification	Active rider classification	Young rider classification	Team classification
1	Casper van Uden	Casper van Uden	Casper van Uden	Unai Zubeldia	Casper van Uden	Q36.5 Pro Cycling Team
2	Søren Wærenskjold	Søren Wærenskjold	Søren Wærenskjold	Atsushi Oka	Søren Wærenskjold	Uno-X Mobility
3	Tim Merlier	Casper van Uden	Casper van Uden	Polychronis Tzortzakis	Casper van Uden	Soudal–Quick-Step
4	Tim Merlier	Tim Merlier	Tim Merlier	Atsushi Oka	Casper van Uden	Team Jayco–AlUla
5	Simon Yates	Simon Yates	Tim Merlier	Atsushi Oka	William Junior Lecerf	Bora–Hansgrohe
Final		Simon Yates	Tim Merlier	Atsushi Oka	William Junior Lecerf	Bora–Hansgrohe

== Classification standings ==
Legend
Denotes the winner of the general classification	Denotes the winner of the points classification
Denotes the winner of the active rider classification	Denotes the winner of the young rider classification

=== General classification ===
Final general classification (1–10)
Rank	Rider	Team	Time
1	Simon Yates (GBR)	Team Jayco–AlUla	18h 37' 05"
2	William Junior Lecerf (BEL)	Soudal–Quick-Step	+ 3"
3	Finn Fisher-Black (NZL)	UAE Team Emirates	+ 3"
4	Matteo Sobrero (ITA)	Bora–Hansgrohe	+ 12"
5	Gianluca Brambilla (ITA)	Q36.5 Pro Cycling Team	+ 18"
6	Davide Formolo (ITA)	Movistar Team	+ 22"
7	Bryan Coquard (FRA)	Cofidis	+ 32"
8	Rick Pluimers (NED)	Tudor Pro Cycling Team	+ 40"
9	Iván Romeo (ESP)	Movistar Team	+ 40"
10	Merhawi Kudus (ERI)	Terengganu Cycling Team	+ 45"

=== Points classification ===
Final points classification (1–10)
Rank	Rider	Team	Points
1	Tim Merlier (BEL)	Soudal–Quick-Step	39
2	Casper van Uden (NED)	Team dsm–firmenich PostNL	39
3	Søren Wærenskjold (NOR)	Uno-X Mobility	25
4	Bryan Coquard (FRA)	Cofidis	22
5	Arvid de Kleijn (NED)	Tudor Pro Cycling Team	17
6	Simon Yates (GBR)	Team Jayco–AlUla	15
7	Luka Mezgec (SLO)	Team Jayco–AlUla	13
8	William Junior Lecerf (BEL)	Soudal–Quick-Step	12
9	Rick Pluimers (NED)	Tudor Pro Cycling Team	11
10	Dušan Rajović (SRB)	Team Bahrain Victorious	11

=== Active rider classification ===
Final active rider classification (1–10)
Rank	Rider	Team	Points
1	Atsushi Oka (JPN)	JCL Team Ukyo	11
2	Tegshbayar Batsaikhan (MGL)	Roojai Insurance	11
3	Polychronis Tzortzakis (GRE)	Roojai Insurance	7
4	Matteo Sobrero (ITA)	Bora–Hansgrohe	6
5	Iker Bonillo (ESP)	Euskaltel–Euskadi	6
6	Unai Zubeldia (ESP)	Euskaltel–Euskadi	6
7	Luis Ángel Maté (ESP)	Euskaltel–Euskadi	5
8	Carter Bettles (AUS)	Roojai Insurance	5
9	Finn Fisher-Black (NZL)	UAE Team Emirates	4
10	Xabier Azparren (ESP)	Q36.5 Pro Cycling Team	3

=== Young rider classification ===
Final young rider classification (1–10)
Rank	Rider	Team	Time
1	William Junior Lecerf (BEL)	Soudal–Quick-Step	18h 37' 08"
2	Finn Fisher-Black (NZL)	UAE Team Emirates	+ 0"
3	Rick Pluimers (NED)	Tudor Pro Cycling Team	+ 37"
4	Iván Romeo (ESP)	Movistar Team	+ 37"
5	Fred Wright (GBR)	Team Bahrain Victorious	+ 49"
6	Casper van Uden (NED)	Team dsm–firmenich PostNL	+ 1' 11"
7	Anders Halland Johannessen (NOR)	Uno-X Mobility	+ 1' 18"
8	Thomas Pesenti (ITA)	JCL Team Ukyo	+ 1' 49"
9	Enekoitz Azparren (ESP)	Euskaltel–Euskadi	+ 1' 49"
10	Edoardo Zambanini (ITA)	Team Bahrain Victorious	+ 1' 55"

=== Teams classification ===
Final team classification (1–10)
Rank	Team	Time
1	(Germany) Bora–Hansgrohe	55h 53' 03"
2	(United Arab Emirates) UAE Team Emirates	+ 25"
3	(Australia) Team Jayco–AlUla	+ 46"
4	(Switzerland) Q36.5 Pro Cycling Team	+ 52"
5	(France) Cofidis	+ 1' 38"
6	(Spain) Movistar Team	+ 1' 39"
7	(Spain) Euskaltel–Euskadi	+ 1' 53"
8	(France) Team TotalEnergies	+ 3' 04"
9	Team Bahrain Victorious	+ 3' 07"
10	(Japan) JCL Team Ukyo	+ 3' 54"
