= Gran Premio Castellón =

Spanish one-day road cycling race

Race details
- Date: January
- Region: Province of Castellón, Spain
- English name: Grand Prix Castellón
- Discipline: Road race
- Competition: UCI Europe Tour
- Type: Single day race
- Organiser: Diputación Provincial de Castellón
- Web site: gpcastellon.es

History
- First edition: 2024
- Editions: 3 (as of 2026)
- First winner: Michael Matthews (AUS)
- Most wins: Michael Matthews (AUS) (2 wins)
- Most recent: Michael Matthews (AUS)

The Ruta de la Cerámica - Gran Premio Castellón is an elite men's professional road bicycle racing event held in the Province of Castellón, Spain. The race was first held in 2024 as a category 1.1 event on the UCI Europe Tour.

== Winners ==
Year	Country	Rider	Team
2024	Australia	Michael Matthews	Team Jayco–AlUla
2025	Portugal	António Morgado	UAE Team Emirates XRG
2026	Australia	Michael Matthews	Team Jayco–AlUla
