= 2025 Decathlon–AG2R La Mondiale Team season =

Decathlon–AG2R La Mondiale
- 2025 season
- UCI code: DAT
- Status: UCI WorldTeam
- Manager: Dominique Serieys (FRA)
- Main sponsor(s): Decathlon; AG2R La Mondiale
- Based: France
- Bicycles: Van Rysel
- Groupset: Shimano

Season victories
- One-day races: 3
- Stage race overall: 1
- Stage race stages: 13
- National Championships: 2
- Most wins: (France) Nicolas Prodhomme (5)

The 2025 season for the Decathlon–AG2R La Mondiale team is the team's 34th season in existence and the 20th consecutive season as a UCI WorldTeam.

== Team roster ==
All ages are as of 1 January 2025, the first day of the 2025 season.

As of 5 January 2025.

Rider	Date of birth
Bruno Armirail (FRA)	11 April 1994 (aged 30)
Clément Berthet (FRA)	2 August 1997 (aged 27)
Léo Bisiaux (FRA)	14 February 2005 (aged 19)
Stefan Bissegger (SUI)	13 September 1998 (aged 26)
Geoffrey Bouchard (FRA)	1 April 1992 (aged 32)
Sam Bennett (IRL)	16 October 1990 (aged 34)
Oscar Chamberlain (AUS)	15 January 2005 (aged 19)
Benoît Cosnefroy (FRA)	17 October 1995 (aged 29)
Dries De Bondt (BEL)	4 July 1991 (aged 33)
Sander De Pestel (BEL)	11 October 1998 (aged 26)
Stan Dewulf (BEL)	20 December 1997 (aged 27)
Felix Gall (AUT)	27 February 1998 (aged 26)
Pierre Gautherat (FRA)	16 January 2003 (aged 21)
Dorian Godon (FRA)	25 May 1996 (aged 28)
Tord Gudmestad (NOR)	8 May 2001 (aged 23)

Rider	Date of birth
Noa Isidore (FRA)	17 September 2004 (aged 20)
Jordan Labrosse (FRA)	15 September 2002 (aged 22)
Victor Lafay (FRA)	17 January 1996 (aged 28)
Paul Lapeira (FRA)	25 February 2000 (aged 24)
Oliver Naesen (BEL)	16 September 1990 (aged 34)
Aurélien Paret-Peintre (FRA)	27 February 1996 (aged 28)
Rasmus Søjberg Pedersen (DEN)	9 July 2002 (aged 22)
Nans Peters (FRA)	12 March 1994 (aged 30)
Gianluca Pollefliet (BEL)	28 January 2002 (aged 22)
Nicolas Prodhomme (FRA)	1 February 1997 (aged 27)
Callum Scotson (AUS)	10 August 1996 (aged 28)
Paul Seixas (FRA)	24 September 2006 (aged 18)
Johannes Staune-Mittet (NOR)	18 January 2002 (aged 22)
Bastien Tronchon (FRA)	29 March 2002 (aged 22)
Andrea Vendrame (ITA)	20 July 1994 (aged 30)

== Season victories ==
Date	Race	Competition	Rider	Country	Location	Ref.
14 February	Tour de la Provence, stage 1	UCI Europe Tour	Sam Bennett (IRL)	France	Saint-Victoret	
16 February	Tour de la Provence, stage 3	UCI Europe Tour	Sam Bennett (IRL)	France	Arles	
23 February	Tour des Alpes-Maritimes, stage 2	UCI Europe Tour	Dorian Godon (FRA)	France	Vence	
12 March	Tirreno–Adriatico, stage 3	UCI World Tour	Andrea Vendrame (ITA)	Italy	Colfiorito	
8 April	Région Pays de la Loire Tour, stage 1	UCI Europe Tour	Sam Bennett (IRL)	France	La Baule-Escoublac	
10 April	Région Pays de la Loire Tour, stage 3	UCI Europe Tour	Sam Bennett (IRL)	France	Hambers	
25 April	Tour of the Alps, stage 5	UCI ProSeries	Nicolas Prodhomme (FRA)	Austria	Lienz	
9 May	Tour du Finistère	UCI Europe Tour	Aubin Sparfel (FRA)	France	Quimper	
10 May	Grand Prix du Morbihan	UCI ProSeries	Benoît Cosnefroy (FRA)	France	Plumelec	
11 May	Tro-Bro Léon	UCI ProSeries	Bastien Tronchon (FRA)	France	Lannilis	
16 May	Four Days of Dunkirk, stage 3	UCI ProSeries	Pierre Gautherat (FRA)	France	Famars	
30 May	Giro d'Italia, stage 19	UCI World Tour	Nicolas Prodhomme (FRA)	Italy	Champoluc	
20 June	Route d'Occitanie, stage 3	UCI Europe Tour	Nicolas Prodhomme (FRA)	France	Luz-Ardiden	
21 June	Route d'Occitanie, overall	UCI Europe Tour	Nicolas Prodhomme (FRA)	France		
5 August	Tour de Pologne, stage 2	UCI World Tour	Paul Lapeira (FRA)	Poland	Karpacz	
7 August	Vuelta a Burgos, stage 3	UCI ProSeries	Léo Bisiaux (FRA)	Spain	Valpuesta	
7 August	Tour de l'Ain, stage 2	UCI Europe Tour	Nicolas Prodhomme (FRA)	France	Lélex Monts-Jura	

== National, Continental, and World Champions ==
Date	Discipline	Jersey	Rider	Country	Location	Ref.
26 June	French National Time Trial Championships		Bruno Armirail (FRA)	France	Les Herbiers	
29 June	French National Road Race Championships		Dorian Godon (FRA)	France	Les Herbiers	
