= 2024 Tour de la Provence =

French cycling race

2024 UCI Europe Tour

Race details
- Dates: 8–11 February 2024
- Stages: 3 + Prologue
- Distance: 510.4 km (317.1 mi)
- Winning time: 11h 52' 36"

Results
Jersey awarded to the overall winner	Winner	Mads Pedersen (DEN)	(Lidl–Trek)
	Second	Axel Zingle (FRA)	(Cofidis)
	Third	Raúl García Pierna (ESP)	(Arkéa–B&B Hotels)
Jersey awarded to the points classification winner	Points	Mads Pedersen (DEN)	(Lidl–Trek)
Jersey awarded to the mountains classification winner	Mountains	Kévin Avoine (FRA)	(Van Rysel–Roubaix)
Jersey awarded to the youth classification winner	Youth	Pierre Gautherat (FRA)	(Decathlon–AG2R La Mondiale)
	Team	(France) Decathlon–AG2R La Mondiale	

The 2024 Tour de la Provence was a road cycling stage race that took place between 8 and 11 February 2024 in the French region of Provence. The race was rated as a category 2.1 event on the 2024 UCI Europe Tour calendar, and was the eighth edition of the Tour de la Provence.

== Teams ==
Five UCI WorldTeams, four UCI ProTeams, and eight UCI Continental teams made up the 17 teams that participated in the race. All but twoteams entered a full squad of seven riders each, with Van Rysel–Roubaix and Astana Qazaqstan Development Team entering six. In total, 117 riders started the race.

UCI WorldTeams

- Arkéa–B&B Hotels
- Cofidis
- Decathlon–AG2R La Mondiale
- Groupama–FDJ
- Lidl–Trek

UCI ProTeams

- Bingoal WB
- Israel–Premier Tech
- Team Corratec–Vini Fantini
- Team TotalEnergies

UCI Continental Teams

- Astana Qazaqstan Development Team
- Beltrami TSA–Tre Colli
- CIC U Nantes Atlantique
- Nice Métropole Côte d'Azur
- Philippe Wagner–Bazin
- Project Echelon Racing
- St. Michel–Mavic–Auber93
- Van Rysel–Roubaix

== Route ==
Stage characteristics and winners
Stage	Date	Course	Distance	Type	Stage winner
P	8 February	Marseille	5 km (3.1 mi)	Individual time trial	Mads Pedersen (DEN)
1	9 February	Aix-en-Provence to Martigues	157.2 km (97.7 mi)	Hilly stage	Mads Pedersen (DEN)
2	10 February	Forcalquier to Manosque	165 km (103 mi)	Hilly stage	Mads Pedersen (DEN)
3	11 February	Rognac to Arles	183.2 km (113.8 mi)	Flat stage	Tom Van Asbroeck (BEL)
Total			510.4 km (317.1 mi)		

== Stages ==
=== Prologue ===
8 February 2024 – Marseille, 5 km (3.1 mi) (ITT)

Prologue Result (1–10)
Rank	Rider	Team	Time
1	Mads Pedersen (DEN)	Lidl–Trek	5' 20"
2	Jakob Söderqvist (SWE)	Lidl–Trek	+ 6"
3	Samuel Watson (GBR)	Groupama–FDJ	+ 10"
4	Bruno Armirail (FRA)	Decathlon–AG2R La Mondiale	+ 11"
5	Jérémy Cabot (FRA)	St. Michel–Mavic–Auber93	+ 12"
6	Damien Touzé (FRA)	Decathlon–AG2R La Mondiale	+ 12"
7	Sam Bennett (IRL)	Decathlon–AG2R La Mondiale	+ 12"
8	Alex Kirsch (LUX)	Lidl–Trek	+ 12"
9	Ewen Costiou (FRA)	Arkéa–B&B Hotels	+ 13"
10	Dorian Godon (FRA)	Decathlon–AG2R La Mondiale	+ 14"

General classification after Prologue (1–10)
Rank	Rider	Team	Time
1	Mads Pedersen (DEN)	Lidl–Trek	5' 20"
2	Jakob Söderqvist (SWE)	Lidl–Trek	+ 6"
3	Samuel Watson (GBR)	Groupama–FDJ	+ 10"
4	Bruno Armirail (FRA)	Decathlon–AG2R La Mondiale	+ 11"
5	Jérémy Cabot (FRA)	St. Michel–Mavic–Auber93	+ 12"
6	Damien Touzé (FRA)	Decathlon–AG2R La Mondiale	+ 12"
7	Sam Bennett (IRL)	Decathlon–AG2R La Mondiale	+ 12"
8	Alex Kirsch (LUX)	Lidl–Trek	+ 12"
9	Ewen Costiou (FRA)	Arkéa–B&B Hotels	+ 13"
10	Dorian Godon (FRA)	Decathlon–AG2R La Mondiale	+ 14"

=== Stage 1 ===
9 February 2024 – Aix-en-Provence to Martigues, 157.2 km (97.7 mi)

Stage 1 Result (1–10)
Rank	Rider	Team	Time
1	Mads Pedersen (DEN)	Lidl–Trek	3h 32' 35"
2	Axel Zingle (FRA)	Cofidis	+ 0"
3	Riley Pickrell (CAN)	Israel–Premier Tech	+ 0"
4	Samuel Watson (GBR)	Groupama–FDJ	+ 0"
5	Enzo Boulet (FRA)	CIC U Nantes Atlantique	+ 0"
6	Jérémy Lecroq (FRA)	St. Michel–Mavic–Auber93	+ 0"
7	Sandy Dujardin (FRA)	Team TotalEnergies	+ 0"
8	David Dekker (NED)	Arkéa–B&B Hotels	+ 0"
9	Paul Hennequin (FRA)	Nice Métropole Côte d'Azur	+ 0"
10	Jon Rye-Johnsen (NOR)	CIC U Nantes Atlantique	+ 0"

General classification after Stage 1 (1–10)
Rank	Rider	Team	Time
1	Mads Pedersen (DEN)	Lidl–Trek	3h 37' 54"
2	Jakob Söderqvist (SWE)	Lidl–Trek	+ 6"
3	Samuel Watson (GBR)	Groupama–FDJ	+ 11"
4	Bruno Armirail (FRA)	Decathlon–AG2R La Mondiale	+ 11"
5	Riley Sheehan (USA)	Israel–Premier Tech	+ 12"
6	Jérémy Cabot (FRA)	St. Michel–Mavic–Auber93	+ 12"
7	Damien Touzé (FRA)	Decathlon–AG2R La Mondiale	+ 12"
8	Sam Bennett (IRL)	Decathlon–AG2R La Mondiale	+ 12"
9	Alex Kirsch (LUX)	Lidl–Trek	+ 13"
10	Raúl García Pierna (ESP)	Arkéa–B&B Hotels	+ 13"

=== Stage 2 ===
10 February 2024 – Forcalquier to Manosque, 165 km (103 mi)

Stage 2 Result (1–10)
Rank	Rider	Team	Time
1	Mads Pedersen (DEN)	Lidl–Trek	4h 04' 19"
2	Axel Zingle (FRA)	Cofidis	+ 0"
3	Clément Champoussin (FRA)	Arkéa–B&B Hotels	+ 2"
4	Tyler Stites (USA)	Project Echelon Racing	+ 2"
5	Alexandre Delettre (FRA)	St. Michel–Mavic–Auber93	+ 2"
6	Riley Sheehan (USA)	Israel–Premier Tech	+ 2"
7	Lorenzo Germani (ITA)	Groupama–FDJ	+ 2"
8	Bruno Armirail (FRA)	Decathlon–AG2R La Mondiale	+ 2"
9	Ewen Costiou (FRA)	Arkéa–B&B Hotels	+ 2"
10	Raúl García Pierna (ESP)	Arkéa–B&B Hotels	+ 2"

General classification after Stage 2 (1–10)
Rank	Rider	Team	Time
1	Mads Pedersen (DEN)	Lidl–Trek	7h 42' 02"
2	Bruno Armirail (FRA)	Decathlon–AG2R La Mondiale	+ 24"
3	Ewen Costiou (FRA)	Arkéa–B&B Hotels	+ 24"
4	Riley Sheehan (USA)	Israel–Premier Tech	+ 25"
5	Raúl García Pierna (ESP)	Arkéa–B&B Hotels	+ 26"
6	Axel Zingle (FRA)	Cofidis	+ 30"
7	Clément Champoussin (FRA)	Arkéa–B&B Hotels	+ 32"
8	Lorenzo Germani (ITA)	Groupama–FDJ	+ 34"
9	Tyler Stites (USA)	Project Echelon Racing	+ 35"
10	Marco Frigo (ITA)	Israel–Premier Tech	+ 38"

=== Stage 3 ===
11 February 2024 – Rognac to Arles, 183.2 km (113.8 mi)

Stage 3 Result (1–10)
Rank	Rider	Team	Time
1	Tom Van Asbroeck (BEL)	Israel–Premier Tech	4h 10' 36"
2	Sam Bennett (IRL)	Decathlon–AG2R La Mondiale	+ 0"
3	Axel Zingle (FRA)	Cofidis	+ 0"
4	Hugo Hofstetter (FRA)	Israel–Premier Tech	+ 0"
5	Mads Pedersen (DEN)	Lidl–Trek	+ 0"
6	Jérémy Lecroq (FRA)	St. Michel–Mavic–Auber93	+ 0"
7	Sandy Dujardin (FRA)	Team TotalEnergies	+ 0"
8	Paul Hennequin (FRA)	Nice Métropole Côte d'Azur	+ 0"
9	Samuel Watson (GBR)	Groupama–FDJ	+ 0"
10	Raúl García Pierna (ESP)	Arkéa–B&B Hotels	+ 0"

General classification after Stage 3 (1–10)
Rank	Rider	Team	Time
1	Mads Pedersen (DEN)	Lidl–Trek	11h 52' 36"
2	Axel Zingle (FRA)	Cofidis	+ 29"
3	Raúl García Pierna (ESP)	Arkéa–B&B Hotels	+ 29"
4	Damien Touzé (FRA)	Decathlon–AG2R La Mondiale	+ 1' 36"
5	Alex Kirsch (LUX)	Lidl–Trek	+ 25"
6	Pierre Gautherat (FRA)	Decathlon–AG2R La Mondiale	+ 1' 46"
7	Alexis Gougeard (FRA)	Cofidis	+ 2' 02"
8	Jakob Söderqvist (SWE)	Lidl–Trek	+ 2' 14"
9	Sam Bennett (IRL)	Decathlon–AG2R La Mondiale	+ 2' 38"
10	Samuel Watson (GBR)	Groupama–FDJ	+ 3' 45"

== Classification leadership table ==
Classification leadership by stage
Stage	Winner	General classification	Points classification	Mountains classification	Young rider classification	Team classification	People's Favourite award
P	Mads Pedersen	Mads Pedersen	Mads Pedersen	Not awarded	Jakob Söderqvist	Lidl–Trek	Jérémy Cabot
1	Mads Pedersen	Mads Pedersen	Mads Pedersen	Kévin Avoine	Jakob Söderqvist	Lidl–Trek	Kévin Avoine
2	Mads Pedersen	Mads Pedersen	Mads Pedersen	Marco Frigo	Ewen Costiou	Arkéa–B&B Hotels	Enzo Boulet
3	Tom Van Asbroeck	Mads Pedersen	Mads Pedersen	Kévin Avoine	Pierre Gautherat	Decathlon–AG2R La Mondiale	
Final		Mads Pedersen	Mads Pedersen	Kévin Avoine	Pierre Gautherat	Decathlon–AG2R La Mondiale	Not awarded

== Classification standings ==
Legend
Denotes the winner of the general classification	Denotes the winner of the points classification
Denotes the winner of the mountains classification	Denotes the winner of the young rider classification
Denotes the winner of the People's Favourite award	

=== General classification ===
Final general classification (1–10)
Rank	Rider	Team	Time
1	Mads Pedersen (DEN)	Lidl–Trek	11h 52' 36"
2	Axel Zingle (FRA)	Cofidis	+ 29"
3	Raúl García Pierna (ESP)	Arkéa–B&B Hotels	+ 29"
4	Damien Touzé (FRA)	Decathlon–AG2R La Mondiale	+ 1' 36"
5	Alex Kirsch (LUX)	Lidl–Trek	+ 1' 41"
6	Pierre Gautherat (FRA)	Decathlon–AG2R La Mondiale	+ 1' 46"
7	Alexis Gougeard (FRA)	Cofidis	+ 2' 02"
8	Jakob Söderqvist (SWE)	Lidl–Trek	+ 2' 14"
9	Sam Bennett (IRL)	Decathlon–AG2R La Mondiale	+ 2' 38"
10	Samuel Watson (GBR)	Groupama–FDJ	+ 3' 45"

=== Points classification ===
Final points classification (1–10)
Rank	Rider	Team	Time
1	Mads Pedersen (DEN)	Lidl–Trek	50
2	Axel Zingle (FRA)	Cofidis	30
3	Samuel Watson (GBR)	Groupama–FDJ	15
4	Tom Van Asbroeck (BEL)	Israel–Premier Tech	10
5	Sam Bennett (IRL)	Decathlon–AG2R La Mondiale	10
6	Clément Champoussin (FRA)	Arkéa–B&B Hotels	10
7	Tyler Stites (USA)	Project Echelon Racing	10
8	Jérémy Lecroq (FRA)	St. Michel–Mavic–Auber93	10
9	Jakob Söderqvist (SWE)	Lidl–Trek	8
10	Alexandre Delettre (FRA)	St. Michel–Mavic–Auber93	8

=== Mountains classification ===
Final mountains classification (1–10)
Rank	Rider	Team	Time
1	Kévin Avoine (FRA)	Van Rysel–Roubaix	11
2	Kasper Saver (BEL)	Philippe Wagner–Bazin	9
3	Ewen Costiou (FRA)	Arkéa–B&B Hotels	5
4	Alexis Guerin (FRA)	Philippe Wagner–Bazin	5
5	Emmanuel Morin (FRA)	Van Rysel–Roubaix	4
6	Nans Peters (FRA)	Decathlon–AG2R La Mondiale	3
7	Mads Pedersen (DEN)	Lidl–Trek	2
8	Alex Kirsch (LUX)	Lidl–Trek	1
9	Alexis Gougeard (FRA)	Cofidis	1
10	Kenny Molly (BEL)	Van Rysel–Roubaix	1

=== Young rider classification ===
Final young rider classification (1–10)
Rank	Rider	Team	Time
1	Pierre Gautherat (FRA)	Decathlon–AG2R La Mondiale	11h 54' 22"
2	Jakob Söderqvist (SWE)	Lidl–Trek	+ 28"
3	Ewen Costiou (FRA)	Arkéa–B&B Hotels	+ 2' 07"
4	Lorenzo Germani (ITA)	Groupama–FDJ	+ 2' 17"
5	Eddy Le Huitouze (FRA)	Groupama–FDJ	+ 7' 44"
6	Thibaut Bernard (BEL)	Bingoal WB	+ 9' 11"
7	Paul Hennequin (FRA)	Nice Métropole Côte d'Azur	+ 9' 20"
8	Andrey Remkhe (KAZ)	Astana Qazaqstan Development Team	+ 12' 24"
9	Giosuè Epis (ITA)	Arkéa–B&B Hotels	+ 14' 54"
10	Jon Rye-Johnsen (NOR)	CIC U Nantes Atlantique	+ 15' 09"

=== Teams classification ===
Final team classification (1–10)
Rank	Team	Time
1	(France) Decathlon–AG2R La Mondiale	35h 41' 20"
2	(United States) Lidl–Trek	+ 26"
3	(France) Cofidis	+ 3' 13"
4	(France) Arkéa–B&B Hotels	+ 4' 54"
5	Israel–Premier Tech	+ 5' 05"
6	(France) Groupama–FDJ	+ 7' 00"
7	(France) St. Michel–Mavic–Auber93	+ 11' 10"
8	(France) Van Rysel–Roubaix	+ 11' 56"
9	(France) Team TotalEnergies	+ 19' 38"
10	(Belgium) Philippe Wagner–Bazin	+ 30' 26"
