= 2025 Groupama–FDJ season =

Groupama–FDJ
- 2025 season
- UCI code: GFC
- Status: UCI WorldTeam
- Manager: Marc Madiot (FRA)
- Main sponsor(s): Groupama; Française des Jeux
- Based: France
- Bicycles: Wilier Triestina
- Groupset: Shimano

Season victories
- One-day races: 4
- Stage race stages: 6
- Most wins: (United Kingdom) Lewis Askey (France) Romain Grégoire (France) Thibaud Gruel (France) Guillaume Martin (2 wins each)

The 2025 season for the Groupama–FDJ team is the team's 29th season in existence and the 21st consecutive season as a UCI WorldTeam.

== Team roster ==
All ages are as of 1 January 2025, the first day of the 2025 season.

As of 5 January 2025.

Rider	Date of birth
Lewis Askey (GBR)	4 May 2001 (aged 23)
Cyril Barthe (FRA)	14 February 1996 (aged 28)
Clément Braz Afonso (FRA)	8 November 1999 (aged 25)
Sven Erik Bystrøm (NOR)	21 January 1992 (aged 32)
Rémi Cavagna (FRA)	10 August 1995 (aged 29)
Clément Davy (FRA)	17 July 1998 (aged 26)
Tom Donnenwirth (FRA)	19 January 1997 (aged 27)
David Gaudu (FRA)	10 October 1996 (aged 28)
Kévin Geniets (LUX)	9 January 1997 (aged 27)
Lorenzo Germani (ITA)	3 March 2002 (aged 22)
Romain Grégoire (FRA)	21 January 2003 (aged 21)
Thibaud Gruel (FRA)	1 May 2004 (aged 20)
Johan Jacobs (SUI)	1 March 1997 (aged 27)
Stefan Küng (SUI)	16 November 1993 (aged 31)

Rider	Date of birth
Olivier Le Gac (FRA)	27 August 1993 (aged 31)
Eddy Le Huitouze (FRA)	3 April 2003 (aged 21)
Valentin Madouas (FRA)	12 July 1996 (aged 28)
Guillaume Martin (FRA)	3 June 1993 (aged 31)
Rudy Molard (FRA)	17 September 1989 (aged 35)
Quentin Pacher (FRA)	6 January 1992 (aged 32)
Enzo Paleni (FRA)	30 May 2002 (aged 22)
Paul Penhoët (FRA)	28 December 2001 (aged 23)
Rémy Rochas (FRA)	18 May 1996 (aged 28)
Brieuc Rolland (FRA)	13 August 2003 (aged 21)
Clément Russo (FRA)	20 January 1995 (aged 29)
Lars van den Berg (NED)	7 July 1998 (aged 26)
Matthew Walls (GBR)	20 April 1998 (aged 26)

== Season victories ==
Date	Race	Competition	Rider	Country	Location	Ref.
10 February	Tour of Oman, stage 3	UCI ProSeries	David Gaudu (FRA)	Oman	Hajar Mountains	
1 March	Faun-Ardèche Classic	UCI ProSeries	Romain Grégoire (FRA)	France	Guilherand-Granges	
18 April	Classic Grand Besançon Doubs	UCI Europe Tour	Guillaume Martin (FRA)	France	Doubs	
19 April	Tour du Jura	UCI Europe Tour	Guillaume Martin (FRA)	France	Jura	
8 May	Boucles de l'Aulne	UCI Europe Tour	Lewis Askey (GBR)	France	Châteaulin	
15 May	Four Days of Dunkirk, stage 2	UCI ProSeries	Lewis Askey (GBR)	France	Crépy-en-Valois	
29 May	Boucles de la Mayenne, prologue	UCI ProSeries	Thibaud Gruel (FRA)	France	Laval (Espace Mayenne)	
21 June	Tour de Suisse, stage 1	UCI World Tour	Romain Grégoire (FRA)	Switzerland	Küssnacht	
21 June	Route d'Occitanie, stage 4	UCI Europe Tour	Thibaud Gruel (FRA)	France	Saint-Girons	
6 August	Tour de l'Ain, stage 1	UCI Europe Tour	Tom Donnenwirth (FRA)	France	Lagnieu	
