= 2025 Tour de la Provence =

French cycling race

2025 UCI Europe Tour

Race details
- Dates: 14–16 February 2025
- Stages: 3
- Distance: 527.2 km (327.6 mi)
- Winning time: 12h 01' 05"

Results
Jersey awarded to the overall winner	Winner	Mads Pedersen (DEN)	(Lidl–Trek)
	Second	Matej Mohorič (SLO)	(Team Bahrain Victorious)
	Third	Marijn van den Berg (NED)	(EF Education–EasyPost)
Jersey awarded to the points classification winner	Points	Mads Pedersen (DEN)	(Lidl–Trek)
Jersey awarded to the mountains classification winner	Mountains	Damien Girard (FRA)	(Nice Métropole Côte d'Azur)
Jersey awarded to the youth classification winner	Youth	Raúl García Pierna (ESP)	(Arkéa–B&B Hotels)
	Team	(United States) Lidl–Trek	

The 2025 Tour de la Provence (Occitan: 2025 Tor de la Provença) was a road cycling stage race that took place between 14 and 16 February 2025 in the French region of Provence. The race was rated as a category 2.1 event on the 2025 UCI Europe Tour calendar, and was the ninth edition of the Tour de la Provence.

== Teams ==
Seven UCI WorldTeams, five UCI ProTeams, and four UCI Continental teams made up the sixteen teams that participated in the race.

UCI WorldTeams

- Arkéa–B&B Hotels
- Cofidis
- Decathlon–AG2R La Mondiale
- EF Education–EasyPost
- Groupama–FDJ
- Lidl–Trek
- Team Bahrain Victorious

UCI ProTeams

- Israel–Premier Tech
- Team Novo Nordisk
- Team TotalEnergies
- Unibet Tietema Rockets
- Wagner Bazin WB

UCI Continental Teams

- CIC–U–Nantes
- Nice Métropole Côte d'Azur
- St. Michel–Preference Home–Auber93
- Van Rysel–Roubaix

== Route ==
Stage characteristics and winners
Stage	Date	Course	Distance	Type	Stage winner
1	14 February	Marseille to Saint-Victoret	169.3 km (105.2 mi)	Hilly stage	Sam Bennett (IRL)
2	15 February	Forcalquier to Manosque	167.3 km (104.0 mi)	Hilly stage	Mads Pedersen (DEN)
3	16 February	Rognac to Arles	190.6 km (118.4 mi)	Flat stage	Sam Bennett (IRL)
Total			527.2 km (327.6 mi)		

== Stages ==
=== Stage 1 ===
14 February 2025 – Marseille to Saint-Victoret, 169.3 km (105.2 mi)

Stage 1 Result
Rank	Rider	Team	Time
1	Sam Bennett (IRL)	Decathlon–AG2R La Mondiale	4h 12' 30"
2	Lukáš Kubiš (SVK)	Unibet Tietema Rockets	+ 0"
3	Alexis Renard (FRA)	Cofidis	+ 0"
4	Clément Russo (FRA)	Groupama–FDJ	+ 0"
5	Mads Pedersen (DEN)	Lidl–Trek	+ 0"
6	Marijn van den Berg (NED)	EF Education–EasyPost	+ 0"
7	Jake Stewart (GBR)	Israel–Premier Tech	+ 0"
8	Thibaud Gruel (FRA)	Groupama–FDJ	+ 0"
9	Mathieu Burgaudeau (FRA)	Team TotalEnergies	+ 0"
10	Fred Wright (GBR)	Team Bahrain Victorious	+ 0"

General classification after Stage 1
Rank	Rider	Team	Time
1	Sam Bennett (IRL)	Decathlon–AG2R La Mondiale	4h 12' 20"
2	Lukáš Kubiš (SVK)	Unibet Tietema Rockets	+ 4"
3	Alexis Renard (FRA)	Cofidis	+ 6"
4	Fred Wright (GBR)	Team Bahrain Victorious	+ 7"
5	Mads Pedersen (DEN)	Lidl–Trek	+ 8"
6	Raúl García Pierna (ESP)	Arkéa–B&B Hotels	+ 8"
7	Thibaud Gruel (FRA)	Groupama–FDJ	+ 9"
8	Sander De Pestel (BEL)	Decathlon–AG2R La Mondiale	+ 9"
9	Clément Russo (FRA)	Groupama–FDJ	+ 10"
10	Marijn van den Berg (NED)	EF Education–EasyPost	+ 10"

=== Stage 2 ===
15 February 2025 – Forcalquier to Manosque, 167.3 km (104.0 mi)

Stage 2 Result
Rank	Rider	Team	Time
1	Mads Pedersen (DEN)	Lidl–Trek	3h 53' 52"
2	Matej Mohorič (SLO)	Team Bahrain Victorious	+ 4"
3	Fred Wright (GBR)	Team Bahrain Victorious	+ 16"
4	Dorian Godon (FRA)	Decathlon–AG2R La Mondiale	+ 16"
5	Marijn van den Berg (NED)	EF Education–EasyPost	+ 16"
6	Paul Penhoët (FRA)	Groupama–FDJ	+ 16"
7	Alex Kirsch (LUX)	Lidl–Trek	+ 16"
8	Thibaud Gruel (FRA)	Groupama–FDJ	+ 16"
9	Bauke Mollema (NED)	Lidl–Trek	+ 16"
10	Raúl García Pierna (ESP)	Arkéa–B&B Hotels	+ 16"

General classification after Stage 2
Rank	Rider	Team	Time
1	Mads Pedersen (DEN)	Lidl–Trek	8h 06' 07"
2	Matej Mohorič (SLO)	Team Bahrain Victorious	+ 13"
3	Fred Wright (GBR)	Team Bahrain Victorious	+ 24"
4	Lukáš Kubiš (SVK)	Unibet Tietema Rockets	+ 25"
5	Sander De Pestel (BEL)	Decathlon–AG2R La Mondiale	+ 28"
6	Raúl García Pierna (ESP)	Arkéa–B&B Hotels	+ 29"
7	Thibaud Gruel (FRA)	Groupama–FDJ	+ 30"
8	Marijn van den Berg (NED)	EF Education–EasyPost	+ 31"
9	Dorian Godon (FRA)	Decathlon–AG2R La Mondiale	+ 31"
10	Jake Stewart (GBR)	Israel–Premier Tech	+ 31"

=== Stage 3 ===
16 February 2025 – Rognac to Arles, 190.6 km (118.4 mi)

Stage 3 Result
Rank	Rider	Team	Time
1	Sam Bennett (IRL)	Decathlon–AG2R La Mondiale	3h 54' 58"
2	Marijn van den Berg (NED)	EF Education–EasyPost	+ 0"
3	Alexander Konijn (NED)	Nice Métropole Côte d'Azur	+ 0"
4	Lukáš Kubiš (SVK)	Unibet Tietema Rockets	+ 0"
5	Paul Penhoët (FRA)	Groupama–FDJ	+ 0"
6	Matyáš Kopecký (CZE)	Team Novo Nordisk	+ 0"
7	Valentin Tabellion (FRA)	Van Rysel–Roubaix	+ 0"
8	Alessandro Borgo (ITA)	Team Bahrain Victorious	+ 0"
9	Mads Pedersen (DEN)	Lidl–Trek	+ 0"
10	Stanisław Aniołkowski (POL)	Cofidis	+ 0"

General classification after Stage 3
Rank	Rider	Team	Time
1	Mads Pedersen (DEN)	Lidl–Trek	12h 01' 05"
2	Matej Mohorič (SLO)	Team Bahrain Victorious	+ 13"
3	Marijn van den Berg (NED)	EF Education–EasyPost	+ 23"
4	Fred Wright (GBR)	Team Bahrain Victorious	+ 23"
5	Lukáš Kubiš (SVK)	Unibet Tietema Rockets	+ 25"
6	Raúl García Pierna (ESP)	Arkéa–B&B Hotels	+ 26"
7	Jake Stewart (GBR)	Israel–Premier Tech	+ 28"
8	Sander De Pestel (BEL)	Decathlon–AG2R La Mondiale	+ 28"
9	Thibaud Gruel (FRA)	Groupama–FDJ	+ 30"
10	Dorian Godon (FRA)	Decathlon–AG2R La Mondiale	+ 31"

== Classification leadership table ==
Classification leadership by stage
Stage	Winner	General classification	Points classification	Mountains classification	Young rider classification	Team classification	People's Favourite award
1	Sam Bennett	Sam Bennett	Sam Bennett	Maximilien Juillard	Raúl García Pierna	Decathlon–AG2R La Mondiale	
2	Mads Pedersen	Mads Pedersen	Mads Pedersen	Damien Girard	Raúl García Pierna	Lidl–Trek	
3	Sam Bennett	Mads Pedersen	Mads Pedersen	Damien Girard	Raúl García Pierna	Lidl–Trek	
Final		Mads Pedersen	Mads Pedersen	Damien Girard	Raúl García Pierna	Lidl–Trek	

== Classification standings ==
Legend
Denotes the winner of the general classification	Denotes the winner of the points classification
Denotes the winner of the mountains classification	Denotes the winner of the young rider classification
Denotes the winner of the People's Favourite award	

=== General classification ===
Final general classification (1–10)
Rank	Rider	Team	Time
1	Mads Pedersen (DEN)	Lidl–Trek	12h 01' 05"
2	Matej Mohorič (SLO)	Team Bahrain Victorious	+ 13"
3	Marijn van den Berg (NED)	EF Education–EasyPost	+ 23"
4	Fred Wright (GBR)	Team Bahrain Victorious	+ 23"
5	Lukáš Kubiš (SVK)	Unibet Tietema Rockets	+ 25"
6	Raúl García Pierna (ESP)	Arkéa–B&B Hotels	+ 26"
7	Jake Stewart (GBR)	Israel–Premier Tech	+ 28"
8	Sander De Pestel (BEL)	Decathlon–AG2R La Mondiale	+ 28"
9	Thibaud Gruel (FRA)	Groupama–FDJ	+ 30"
10	Dorian Godon (FRA)	Decathlon–AG2R La Mondiale	+ 31"

=== Points classification ===
Final points classification (1–10)
Rank	Rider	Team	Time
1	Mads Pedersen (DEN)	Lidl–Trek	35
2	Sam Bennett (IRL)	Decathlon–AG2R La Mondiale	30
3	Marijn van den Berg (NED)	EF Education–EasyPost	30
4	Lukáš Kubiš (SVK)	Unibet Tietema Rockets	21
5	Fred Wright (GBR)	Team Bahrain Victorious	19
6	Paul Penhoët (FRA)	Groupama–FDJ	15
7	Matej Mohorič (SLO)	Team Bahrain Victorious	12
8	Raúl García Pierna (ESP)	Arkéa–B&B Hotels	11
9	Jake Stewart (GBR)	Israel–Premier Tech	11
10	Thibaud Gruel (FRA)	Groupama–FDJ	11

=== Mountains classification ===
Final mountains classification (1–10)
Rank	Rider	Team	Time
1	Damien Girard (FRA)	Nice Métropole Côte d'Azur	13
2	Mads Pedersen (DEN)	Lidl–Trek	9
3	Maximilien Juillard (FRA)	Van Rysel–Roubaix	9
4	Raúl García Pierna (ESP)	Arkéa–B&B Hotels	8
5	Sander De Pestel (BEL)	Decathlon–AG2R La Mondiale	7
6	Mattéo Vercher (FRA)	Team TotalEnergies	5
7	Matis Louvel (FRA)	Israel–Premier Tech	4
8	Jefferson Alexander Cepeda (ECU)	EF Education–EasyPost	3
9	Julien Bernard (FRA)	Lidl–Trek	3
10	Antoine Hue (FRA)	CIC–U–Nantes	3

=== Young rider classification ===
Final young rider classification (1–10)
Rank	Rider	Team	Time
1	Raúl García Pierna (ESP)	Arkéa–B&B Hotels	12h 01' 31"
2	Thibaud Gruel (FRA)	Groupama–FDJ	+ 4"
3	Lucas Beneteau (FRA)	St. Michel–Preference Home–Auber93	+ 5"
4	Ewen Costiou (FRA)	Arkéa–B&B Hotels	+ 13"
5	Colby Simmons (USA)	EF Education–EasyPost	+ 1' 14"
6	Lenaic Langella (FRA)	CIC–U–Nantes	+ 3' 47"
7	Baptiste Vadic (FRA)	Team TotalEnergies	+ 6' 45"
8	Edoardo Zamperini (ITA)	Arkéa–B&B Hotels	+ 6' 52"
9	Mattéo Vercher (FRA)	Team TotalEnergies	+ 7' 16"
10	Darren Rafferty (IRL)	EF Education–EasyPost	+ 8' 00"

=== Teams classification ===
Final team classification (1–10)
Rank	Team	Time
1	(United States) Lidl–Trek	36h 04' 32"
2	(France) Cofidis	+ 1' 00"
3	(France) Decathlon–AG2R La Mondiale	+ 1' 25"
4	(France) Groupama–FDJ	+ 1' 25"
5	(France) Unibet Tietema Rockets	+ 1' 25"
6	(United States) EF Education–EasyPost	+ 1' 58"
7	(France) Team TotalEnergies	+ 5' 29"
8	(France) Van Rysel–Roubaix	+ 5' 33"
9	(France) Arkéa–B&B Hotels	+ 7' 11"
10	Team Bahrain Victorious	+ 10' 08"
