= 2024 Four Days of Dunkirk =

French cycling race

2024 UCI ProSeries

Race details
- Dates: 14–19 May 2024
- Stages: 6
- Distance: 1,045.1 km (649.4 mi)
- Winning time: 23h 58' 57"

Results
Jersey awarded to the overall winner	Winner	Sam Bennett (IRL)	(Decathlon–AG2R La Mondiale)
	Second	Paul Penhoët (FRA)	(Groupama–FDJ)
	Third	Jenno Berckmoes (BEL)	(Lotto–Dstny)
Jersey awarded to the points classification winner	Points	Sam Bennett (IRL)	(Decathlon–AG2R La Mondiale)
Jersey awarded to the mountains classification winner	Mountains	Fausto Masnada (ITA)	(Soudal–Quick-Step)
Jersey awarded to the youth classification winner	Youth	Paul Penhoët (FRA)	(Groupama–FDJ)
	Team	(Belgium) Lotto–Dstny	

The 2024 Four Days of Dunkirk (French: Quatre Jours de Dunkerque 2024) was a road cycling stage race that took place between 14 and 19 May 2024 in the French administrative region of Hauts-de-France. The race was rated as a category 2.Pro event on the 2024 UCI ProSeries calendar, and was the 68th edition of the Four Days of Dunkirk.

== Teams ==
Six UCI WorldTeams, six UCI ProTeams and six UCI Continental teams made up the eighteen teams that participated in the race.

UCI WorldTeams

- Arkéa–B&B Hotels
- Cofidis
- Decathlon–AG2R La Mondiale
- Groupama–FDJ
- Soudal–Quick-Step
- Team dsm–firmenich PostNL

UCI ProTeams

- Bingoal WB
- Israel–Premier Tech
- Lotto–Dstny
- Q36.5 Pro Cycling Team
- TDT–Unibet Cycling Team
- Team TotalEnergies

UCI Continental Teams

- CIC U Nantes Atlantique
- Nice Métropole Côte d'Azur
- Philippe Wagner–Bazin
- St. Michel–Mavic–Auber93
- Trinity Racing
- Van Rysel–Roubaix

== Route ==
Stage characteristics and winners
Stage	Date	Course	Distance	Type	Stage winner
1	14 May	Dunkirk to Le Touquet	173 km (107 mi)	Hilly stage	Milan Fretin (BEL)
2	15 May	Wimereux to Abbeville	184.2 km (114.5 mi)	Hilly stage	Sam Bennett (IRL)
3	16 May	Saint-Laurent-Blangy to Bouchain	165.1 km (102.6 mi)	Flat stage	Sam Bennett (IRL)
4	17 May	Mazingarbe to Pont-à-Marcq	166.8 km (103.6 mi)	Flat stage	Warre Vangheluwe (BEL)
5	18 May	Arques to Cassel	179.1 km (111.3 mi)	Hilly stage	Sam Bennett (IRL)
6	19 May	Loon-Plage to Dunkirk	176.8 km (109.9 mi)	Flat stage	Sam Bennett (IRL)
Total			1,045.1 km (649.4 mi)		

== Stages ==
=== Stage 1 ===
14 May 2024 – Dunkirk to Le Touquet, 173 km (107 mi)

Stage 1 result
Rank	Rider	Team	Time
1	Milan Fretin (BEL)	Cofidis	4h 05' 47"
2	Paul Hennequin (FRA)	Nice Métropole Côte d'Azur	+ 0"
3	Sam Bennett (IRL)	Decathlon–AG2R La Mondiale	+ 0"
4	Amaury Capiot (BEL)	Arkéa–B&B Hotels	+ 0"
5	Milan Menten (BEL)	Lotto–Dstny	+ 0"
6	Rory Townsend (IRL)	Q36.5 Pro Cycling Team	+ 0"
7	Jordi Warlop (BEL)	Soudal–Quick-Step	+ 0"
8	Nils Eekhoff (NED)	Team dsm–firmenich PostNL	+ 0"
9	Rait Ärm (EST)	Van Rysel–Roubaix	+ 0"
10	Casper van Uden (NED)	Team dsm–firmenich PostNL	+ 0"

General classification after Stage 1
Rank	Rider	Team	Time
1	Milan Fretin (BEL)	Cofidis	4h 05' 37"
2	Paul Hennequin (FRA)	Nice Métropole Côte d'Azur	+ 4"
3	Sam Bennett (IRL)	Decathlon–AG2R La Mondiale	+ 6"
4	Amaury Capiot (BEL)	Arkéa–B&B Hotels	+ 10"
5	Milan Menten (BEL)	Lotto–Dstny	+ 10"
6	Rory Townsend (IRL)	Q36.5 Pro Cycling Team	+ 10"
7	Jordi Warlop (BEL)	Soudal–Quick-Step	+ 10"
8	Nils Eekhoff (NED)	Team dsm–firmenich PostNL	+ 10"
9	Rait Ärm (EST)	Van Rysel–Roubaix	+ 10"
10	Casper van Uden (NED)	Team dsm–firmenich PostNL	+ 10"

=== Stage 2 ===
15 May 2024 – Wimereux to Abbeville, 184.3 km (114.5 mi)

Stage 2 result
Rank	Rider	Team	Time
1	Sam Bennett (IRL)	Decathlon–AG2R La Mondiale	4h 20' 25"
2	Paul Penhoët (FRA)	Groupama–FDJ	+ 0"
3	Sasha Weemaes (BEL)	Bingoal WB	+ 0"
4	Pascal Ackermann (GER)	Israel–Premier Tech	+ 0"
5	Jérémy Lecroq (FRA)	St. Michel–Mavic–Auber93	+ 0"
6	Amaury Capiot (BEL)	Arkéa–B&B Hotels	+ 0"
7	Emmanuel Morin (FRA)	Van Rysel–Roubaix	+ 0"
8	Jordi Warlop (BEL)	Soudal–Quick-Step	+ 0"
9	Jason Tesson (FRA)	Team TotalEnergies	+ 0"
10	Milan Menten (BEL)	Lotto–Dstny	+ 0"

General classification after Stage 2
Rank	Rider	Team	Time
1	Sam Bennett (IRL)	Decathlon–AG2R La Mondiale	8h 25' 58"
2	Milan Fretin (BEL)	Cofidis	+ 4"
3	Paul Penhoët (FRA)	Groupama–FDJ	+ 8"
4	Paul Hennequin (FRA)	Nice Métropole Côte d'Azur	+ 8"
5	Sasha Weemaes (BEL)	Bingoal WB	+ 10"
6	Corbin Strong (NZL)	Israel–Premier Tech	+ 11"
7	Amaury Capiot (BEL)	Arkéa–B&B Hotels	+ 12"
8	Jenno Berckmoes (BEL)	Lotto–Dstny	+ 13"
9	Milan Menten (BEL)	Lotto–Dstny	+ 14"
10	Jordi Warlop (BEL)	Soudal–Quick-Step	+ 14"

=== Stage 3 ===
16 May 2024– Saint-Laurent-Blangy to Bouchain, 165.1 km (102.6 mi)

Stage 3 result
Rank	Rider	Team	Time
1	Sam Bennett (IRL)	Decathlon–AG2R La Mondiale	3h 42' 38"
2	Milan Fretin (BEL)	Cofidis	+ 0"
3	Amaury Capiot (BEL)	Arkéa–B&B Hotels	+ 0"
4	Nils Eekhoff (NED)	Team dsm–firmenich PostNL	+ 0"
5	Pascal Ackermann (GER)	Israel–Premier Tech	+ 0"
6	Pierre Barbier (FRA)	Philippe Wagner–Bazin	+ 0"
7	Paul Penhoët (FRA)	Groupama–FDJ	+ 0"
8	Jason Tesson (FRA)	Team TotalEnergies	+ 0"
9	Rory Townsend (IRL)	Q36.5 Pro Cycling Team	+ 0"
10	Paul Hennequin (FRA)	Nice Métropole Côte d'Azur	+ 0"

General classification after Stage 3
Rank	Rider	Team	Time
1	Sam Bennett (IRL)	Decathlon–AG2R La Mondiale	12h 08' 26"
2	Milan Fretin (BEL)	Cofidis	+ 8"
3	Amaury Capiot (BEL)	Arkéa–B&B Hotels	+ 18"
4	Paul Penhoët (FRA)	Groupama–FDJ	+ 18"
5	Paul Hennequin (FRA)	Nice Métropole Côte d'Azur	+ 18"
6	Fabio Christen (SUI)	Q36.5 Pro Cycling Team	+ 18"
7	Sasha Weemaes (BEL)	Bingoal WB	+ 20"
8	Corbin Strong (NZL)	Israel–Premier Tech	+ 21"
9	Jenno Berckmoes (BEL)	Lotto–Dstny	+ 22"
10	Rory Townsend (IRL)	Q36.5 Pro Cycling Team	+ 24"

=== Stage 4 ===
17 May 2024 – Mazingarbe to Pont-à-Marcq, 166.8 km (103.6 mi)

Stage 4 result
Rank	Rider	Team	Time
1	Warre Vangheluwe (BEL)	Soudal–Quick-Step	3h 35' 22"
2	Sam Bennett (IRL)	Decathlon–AG2R La Mondiale	+ 0"
3	Corbin Strong (NZL)	Israel–Premier Tech	+ 0"
4	Milan Fretin (BEL)	Cofidis	+ 0"
5	Paul Hennequin (FRA)	Nice Métropole Côte d'Azur	+ 0"
6	Milan Menten (BEL)	Lotto–Dstny	+ 0"
7	Emmanuel Morin (FRA)	Van Rysel–Roubaix	+ 0"
8	Tom Van Asbroeck (BEL)	Israel–Premier Tech	+ 0"
9	Alexis Renard (FRA)	Cofidis	+ 0"
10	Luca Van Boven (BEL)	Bingoal WB	+ 0"

General classification after Stage 4
Rank	Rider	Team	Time
1	Sam Bennett (IRL)	Decathlon–AG2R La Mondiale	15h 43' 42"
2	Milan Fretin (BEL)	Cofidis	+ 14"
3	Corbin Strong (NZL)	Israel–Premier Tech	+ 23"
4	Amaury Capiot (BEL)	Arkéa–B&B Hotels	+ 24"
5	Paul Penhoët (FRA)	Groupama–FDJ	+ 24"
6	Paul Hennequin (FRA)	Nice Métropole Côte d'Azur	+ 24"
7	Fabio Christen (SUI)	Q36.5 Pro Cycling Team	+ 24"
8	Tomáš Kopecký (CZE)	TDT–Unibet Cycling Team	+ 26"
9	Jenno Berckmoes (BEL)	Lotto–Dstny	+ 28"
10	Tom Van Asbroeck (BEL)	Israel–Premier Tech	+ 29"

=== Stage 5 ===
18 May 2024 – Arques to Cassel, 179.1 km (111.3 mi)

Stage 5 result
Rank	Rider	Team	Time
1	Sam Bennett (IRL)	Decathlon–AG2R La Mondiale	4h 24' 31"
2	Paul Penhoët (FRA)	Groupama–FDJ	+ 0"
3	Jenno Berckmoes (BEL)	Lotto–Dstny	+ 0"
4	Luca Van Boven (BEL)	Bingoal WB	+ 3"
5	Alexandre Delettre (FRA)	St. Michel–Mavic–Auber93	+ 3"
6	Nicolas Breuillard (FRA)	St. Michel–Mavic–Auber93	+ 3"
7	Oliver Naesen (BEL)	Decathlon–AG2R La Mondiale	+ 6"
8	Milan Menten (BEL)	Lotto–Dstny	+ 10"
9	Samuel Watson (GBR)	Groupama–FDJ	+ 10"
10	Samuel Leroux (FRA)	Van Rysel–Roubaix	+ 10"

General classification after Stage 5
Rank	Rider	Team	Time
1	Sam Bennett (IRL)	Decathlon–AG2R La Mondiale	20h 08' 03"
2	Paul Penhoët (FRA)	Groupama–FDJ	+ 28"
3	Jenno Berckmoes (BEL)	Lotto–Dstny	+ 31"
4	Luca Van Boven (BEL)	Bingoal WB	+ 43"
5	Alexandre Delettre (FRA)	St. Michel–Mavic–Auber93	+ 43"
6	Milan Fretin (BEL)	Cofidis	+ 45"
7	Oliver Naesen (BEL)	Decathlon–AG2R La Mondiale	+ 46"
8	Tomáš Kopecký (CZE)	TDT–Unibet Cycling Team	+ 46"
9	Thomas Gachignard (FRA)	Team TotalEnergies	+ 49"
10	Milan Menten (BEL)	Lotto–Dstny	+ 50"

=== Stage 6 ===
19 May 2024 – Loon-Plage to Dunkirk, 176.8 km (109.9 mi)

Stage 6 result
Rank	Rider	Team	Time
1	Sam Bennett (IRL)	Decathlon–AG2R La Mondiale	3h 51' 04"
2	Sasha Weemaes (BEL)	Bingoal WB	+ 0"
3	Pascal Ackermann (GER)	Israel–Premier Tech	+ 0"
4	Amaury Capiot (BEL)	Arkéa–B&B Hotels	+ 0"
5	Paul Penhoët (FRA)	Groupama–FDJ	+ 0"
6	Casper van Uden (NED)	Team dsm–firmenich PostNL	+ 0"
7	Pierre Barbier (FRA)	Philippe Wagner–Bazin	+ 0"
8	Lorrenzo Manzin (FRA)	Team TotalEnergies	+ 0"
9	Paul Hennequin (FRA)	Nice Métropole Côte d'Azur	+ 0"
10	Milan Menten (BEL)	Lotto–Dstny	+ 0"

General classification after Stage 6
Rank	Rider	Team	Time
1	Sam Bennett (IRL)	Decathlon–AG2R La Mondiale	23h 58' 57"
2	Paul Penhoët (FRA)	Groupama–FDJ	+ 38"
3	Jenno Berckmoes (BEL)	Lotto–Dstny	+ 41"
4	Luca Van Boven (BEL)	Bingoal WB	+ 53"
5	Alexandre Delettre (FRA)	St. Michel–Mavic–Auber93	+ 53"
6	Milan Fretin (BEL)	Cofidis	+ 55"
7	Tomáš Kopecký (CZE)	TDT–Unibet Cycling Team	+ 55"
8	Oliver Naesen (BEL)	Decathlon–AG2R La Mondiale	+ 56"
9	Thomas Gachignard (FRA)	Team TotalEnergies	+ 57"
10	Aimé De Gendt (BEL)	Cofidis	+ 57"

== Classification leadership table ==
Classification leadership by stage
Stage	Winner	General classification	Points classification	Mountains classification	Young rider classification	Team classification
1	Milan Fretin	Milan Fretin	Milan Fretin	Gwen Leclainche	Milan Fretin	Decathlon–AG2R La Mondiale
2	Sam Bennett	Sam Bennett	Sam Bennett	Maxime Jarnet	Milan Fretin	Decathlon–AG2R La Mondiale
3	Sam Bennett	Sam Bennett	Sam Bennett	Gwen Leclainche	Milan Fretin	Decathlon–AG2R La Mondiale
4	Warre Vangheluwe	Sam Bennett	Sam Bennett	Gwen Leclainche	Milan Fretin	Decathlon–AG2R La Mondiale
5	Sam Bennett	Sam Bennett	Sam Bennett	Fausto Masnada	Paul Penhoët	Lotto–Dstny
6	Sam Bennett	Sam Bennett	Sam Bennett	Fausto Masnada	Paul Penhoët	Lotto–Dstny
Final		Sam Bennett	Sam Bennett	Fausto Masnada	Paul Penhoët	Lotto–Dstny

== Classification standings ==
Legend
Denotes the winner of the general classification	Denotes the winner of the mountains classification
Denotes the winner of the points classification	Denotes the winner of the young rider classification
Denotes the winner of the team classification	

=== General classification ===
Final general classification (1–10)
Rank	Rider	Team	Time
1	Sam Bennett (IRL)	Decathlon–AG2R La Mondiale	23h 58' 57"
2	Paul Penhoët (FRA)	Groupama–FDJ	+ 38"
3	Jenno Berckmoes (BEL)	Lotto–Dstny	+ 41"
4	Luca Van Boven (BEL)	Bingoal WB	+ 53"
5	Alexandre Delettre (FRA)	St. Michel–Mavic–Auber93	+ 53"
6	Milan Fretin (BEL)	Cofidis	+ 55"
7	Tomáš Kopecký (CZE)	TDT–Unibet Cycling Team	+ 55"
8	Oliver Naesen (BEL)	Decathlon–AG2R La Mondiale	+ 56"
9	Thomas Gachignard (FRA)	Team TotalEnergies	+ 57"
10	Aimé De Gendt (BEL)	Cofidis	+ 57"

=== Points classification ===
Final points classification (1–10)
Rank	Rider	Team	Points
1	Sam Bennett (IRL)	Decathlon–AG2R La Mondiale	81
2	Milan Fretin (BEL)	Cofidis	34
3	Paul Penhoët (FRA)	Groupama–FDJ	34
4	Amaury Capiot (BEL)	Arkéa–B&B Hotels	30
5	Pascal Ackermann (GER)	Israel–Premier Tech	22
6	Paul Hennequin (FRA)	Nice Métropole Côte d'Azur	21
7	Sasha Weemaes (BEL)	Bingoal WB	21
8	Milan Menten (BEL)	Lotto–Dstny	16
9	Warre Vangheluwe (BEL)	Soudal–Quick-Step	15
10	Jenno Berckmoes (BEL)	Lotto–Dstny	14

=== Mountains classification ===
Final mountains classification (1–10)
Rank	Rider	Team	Points
1	Fausto Masnada (ITA)	Soudal–Quick-Step	27
2	Gwen Leclainche (FRA)	Philippe Wagner–Bazin	21
3	Maxime Jarnet (FRA)	Van Rysel–Roubaix	15
4	Enzo Leijnse (NED)	Team dsm–firmenich PostNL	13
5	Cyrus Monk (AUS)	Q36.5 Pro Cycling Team	8
6	Robin Plamondon (CAN)	CIC U Nantes Atlantique	7
7	Jérémy Lecroq (FRA)	St. Michel–Mavic–Auber93	7
8	Thomas Gachignard (FRA)	Team TotalEnergies	5
9	Kasper Asgreen (DEN)	Soudal–Quick-Step	5
10	Pascal Ackermann (GER)	Israel–Premier Tech	5

=== Young rider classification ===
Final young rider classification (1–10)
Rank	Rider	Team	Time
1	Paul Penhoët (FRA)	Groupama–FDJ	23h 59' 35"
2	Jenno Berckmoes (BEL)	Lotto–Dstny	+ 3"
3	Luca Van Boven (BEL)	Bingoal WB	+ 15"
4	Milan Fretin (BEL)	Cofidis	+ 17"
5	Tomáš Kopecký (CZE)	TDT–Unibet Cycling Team	+ 17"
6	Thomas Gachignard (FRA)	Team TotalEnergies	+ 19"
7	Samuel Watson (GBR)	Groupama–FDJ	+ 22"
8	Liam Slock (BEL)	Lotto–Dstny	+ 31"
9	Casper van Uden (NED)	Team dsm–firmenich PostNL	+ 33"
10	Antoine Huby (FRA)	Soudal–Quick-Step	+ 33"

=== Team classification ===
Final team classification (1–10)
Rank	Team	Time
1	(Belgium) Lotto–Dstny	71h 59' 41"
2	(France) Groupama–FDJ	+ 11"
3	(France) Decathlon–AG2R La Mondiale	+ 38"
4	(France) Cofidis	+ 1' 03"
5	(France) Arkéa–B&B Hotels	+ 2' 06"
6	(France) St. Michel–Mavic–Auber93	+ 2' 21"
7	(France) Team TotalEnergies	+ 2' 52"
8	(Netherlands) TDT–Unibet Cycling Team	+ 3' 06"
9	Israel–Premier Tech	+ 3' 18"
10	(France) Van Rysel–Roubaix	+ 10' 28"
