= 2024 Grand Prix La Marseillaise =

2024 UCI Europe Tour

Race details
- Dates: 28 January 2024
- Distance: 167.5 km (104.1 mi)
- Winning time: 4h 07' 52"

Results
	Winner	Kevin Geniets (LUX)	(Groupama–FDJ)
	Second	Alex Baudin (FRA)	(Decathlon–AG2R La Mondiale)
	Third	Kévin Vauquelin (FRA)	(Arkéa–B&B Hotels)

The 2024 Grand Prix La Marseillaise was the 45th edition of the Grand Prix La Marseillaise cycle race. It was held on 28 January 2024 as a category 1.1 race on the 2024 UCI Europe Tour. The race started and finished in Marseille. The race was won by Kevin Geniets of Groupama–FDJ, outsprinting Alex Baudin.

== Teams ==
Five of the 18 UCI WorldTeams, nine UCI ProTeams, and six UCI Continental teams made up the 20 teams that entered the race, with all entering the maximum of seven riders.

UCI WorldTeams

- Alpecin–Deceuninck
- Arkéa–B&B Hotels
- Cofidis
- Decathlon–AG2R La Mondiale
- Groupama–FDJ

UCI ProTeams

- Bingoal WB
- Caja Rural–Seguros RGA
- Team Corratec–Vini Fantini
- Equipo Kern Pharma
- Lotto–Dstny
- Team Flanders–Baloise
- Team TotalEnergies
- Tudor Pro Cycling Team
- Uno-X Mobility

UCI Continental Teams

- Beltrami TSA–Tre Colli
- CIC U Nantes Atlantique
- Nice Métropole Côte d'Azur
- Philippe Wagner–Bazin
- St. Michel–Mavic–Auber93
- Van Rysel–Roubaix

== Result ==
Result
Rank	Rider	Team	Time
1	Kevin Geniets (LUX)	Groupama–FDJ	4h 07' 52"
2	Alex Baudin (FRA)	Decathlon–AG2R La Mondiale	+ 0"
3	Kévin Vauquelin (FRA)	Arkéa–B&B Hotels	+ 10"
4	Pierre Gautherat (FRA)	Decathlon–AG2R La Mondiale	+ 1' 14"
5	Pau Miquel (ESP)	Equipo Kern Pharma	+ 1' 14"
6	Quentin Pacher (FRA)	Groupama–FDJ	+ 1' 14"
7	Jenno Berckmoes (BEL)	Lotto–Dstny	+ 1' 14"
8	Eduard Prades (ESP)	Caja Rural–Seguros RGA	+ 1' 14"
9	Matteo Trentin (ITA)	Tudor Pro Cycling Team	+ 1' 14"
10	Damien Girard (FRA)	Nice Métropole Côte d'Azur	+ 1' 14"
