= Axel Zingle =

French cyclist

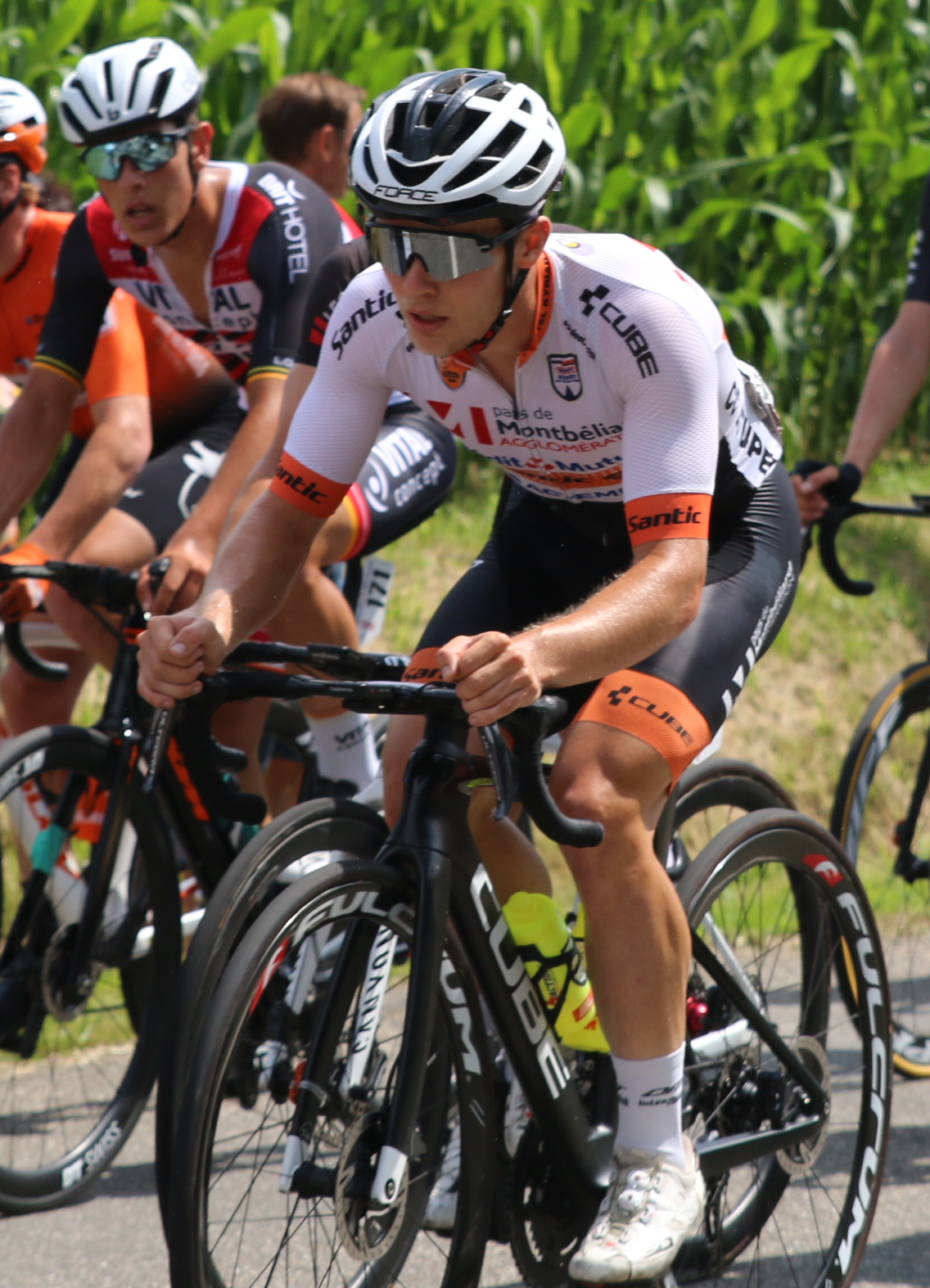
- Zingle at the 2021 Tour Alsace

Personal information
- Born: 18 December 1998 (age 27) Mulhouse, France
- Height: 1.73 m (5 ft 8 in)
- Weight: 67 kg (148 lb)

Cycling career
- Sport: Cycling
- Current team: Visma–Lease a Bike
- Disciplines: Road; Mountain bike
- Role: Rider
- Rider type: Sprinter; Classics Specialist

Amateur teams
- 2017–2018: VC Unité Schwenheim
- 2019–2021: CC Étupes

Professional teams
- 2020: Nippo–Delko–One Provence (stagiaire)
- 2021: Cofidis (stagiaire)
- 2022–2024: Cofidis
- 2025–: Visma–Lease a Bike

Axel Zingle (born 18 December 1998) is a French cyclist, who currently rides for UCI WorldTeam Visma–Lease a Bike.

== Major results ==
=== Road ===
2020
1st Road race, National Under-23 Championships
9th Paris–Camembert
2021
1st Stage 1 Tour de Guadeloupe
3rd Classic Grand Besançon Doubs
6th Tour du Jura
8th Route Adélie
8th Tour de Vendée
2022 (3 pro wins)
1st Route Adélie
1st Famenne Ardenne Classic
2nd Circuit de Wallonie
3rd Road race, National Championships
3rd Tour du Jura
4th Overall Arctic Race of Norway

1st Points classification
1st Stage 1

5th Overall Circuit de la Sarthe
7th Cholet-Pays de la Loire
7th Druivenkoers Overijse
8th Grand Prix de Wallonie
9th Boucles de l'Aulne
9th Paris–Bourges
10th Paris–Camembert
10th Grote Prijs Marcel Kint
2023 (1)
1st Classic Loire Atlantique
3rd Overall Boucles de la Mayenne
3rd Tour du Finistère
4th Trofeo Ses Salines–Alcúdia
4th Tour of Leuven
5th Brabantse Pijl
5th Trofeo Calvia
6th Boucles de l'Aulne
7th Japan Cup
7th Cholet-Pays de la Loire
8th Overall Renewi Tour
9th Grand Prix du Morbihan
9th Trofeo Palma
10th Amstel Gold Race
2024 (1)
1st Boucles de l'Aulne
2nd Overall Tour de la Provence
2nd Grand Prix du Morbihan
2nd Circuit Franco-Belge
2nd Circuit de Wallonie
2nd Famenne Ardenne Classic
3rd Overall Boucles de la Mayenne
3rd Overall Tour du Limousin
4th Tour du Finistère
6th Hamburg Cyclassics
7th Japan Cup
9th Grand Prix de Wallonie
2025 (1)
1st Stage 1 Four Days of Dunkirk
1st Stage 3 (TTT) Paris–Nice
2026
5th Grand Prix de Denain
7th Tro-Bro Léon

==== Grand Tour general classification results timeline ====
Grand Tour	2023	2024	2025
Giro d'Italia	—	—	—
Tour de France	142	108	—
Vuelta a España	—	—	DNF

Legend
—	Did not compete
DNF	Did not finish
IP	Race in Progress

=== Mountain bike ===
2016
1st Roc d'Azur Juniors
European Championships

2nd Team relay
3rd Junior Cross-country

3rd Cross-country, National Junior Championships
2018
2nd Cross-country, National Under-23 Championships

== Other information ==
During stage 5 of the 2024 Tour de France, as Mark Cavendish was just about to secure his record-breaking 35th stage win, Mads Pedersen crashed into a barrier and fell full length onto the road. Zingle, who had just completed his sprint lead-out duties but was still riding at high speed immediately behind, bunny hopped over him and rode over the finishing line. Pedersen escaped serious injury
