= Raúl García Pierna =

Spanish cyclist (born 2001)

Raúl García
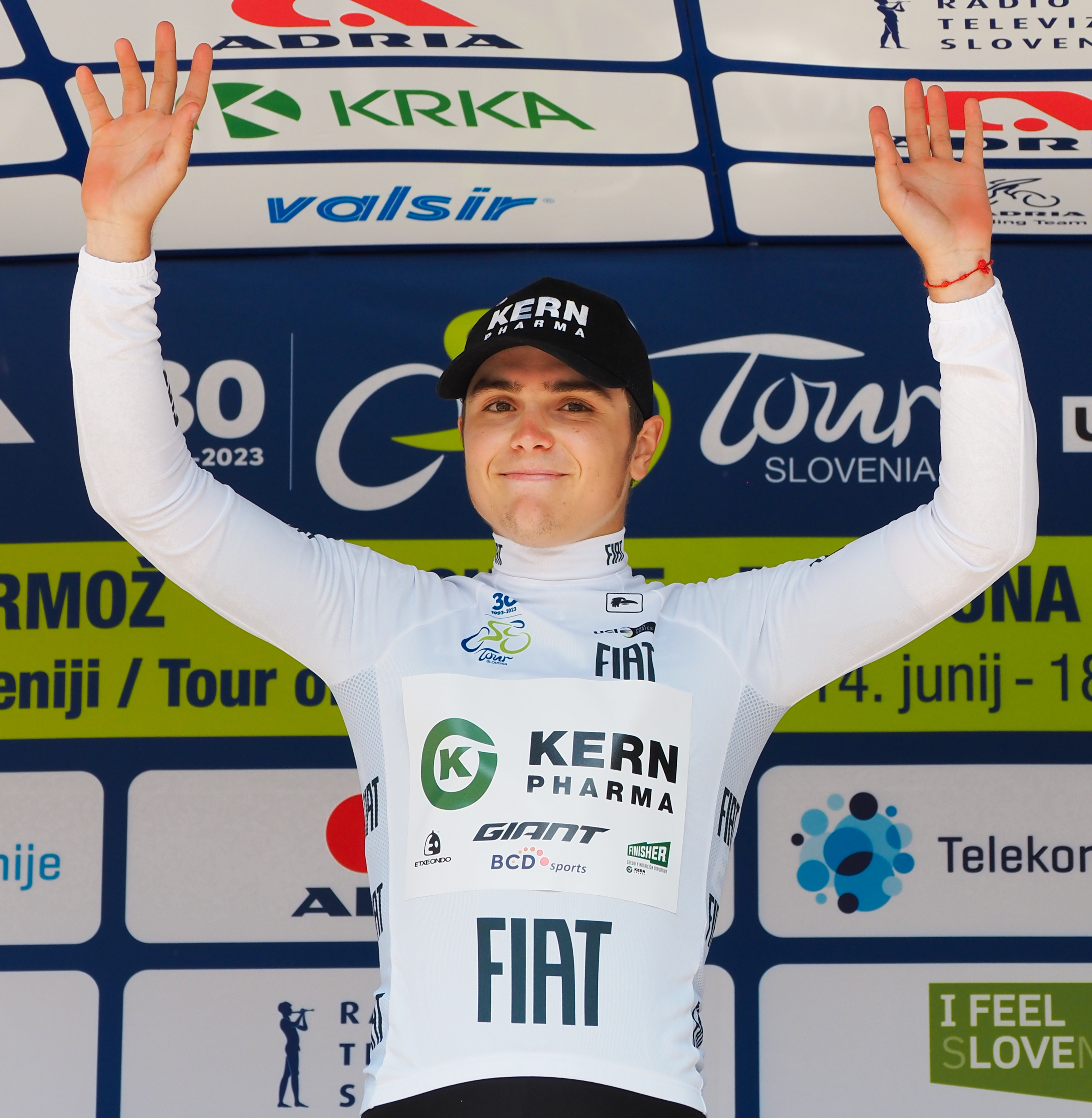
- García at the 2023 Tour of Slovenia

Personal information
- Full name: Raúl García Pierna
- Born: 23 February 2001 (age 25) Tres Cantos, Spain
- Height: 1.75 m (5 ft 9 in)
- Weight: 67 kg (148 lb)

Cycling career
- Sport: Cycling
- Current team: Movistar Team
- Disciplines: Road; Track
- Role: Rider
- Rider type: All-rounder

Amateur team
- 2020: Lizarte

Professional teams
- 2021–2023: Equipo Kern Pharma
- 2024–2025: Arkéa–B&B Hotels
- 2026-: Movistar Team

Major wins
- One-day races and Classics National Time Trial Championships (2022)

Raúl García Pierna (born 23 February 2001) is a Spanish cyclist, who currently rides for UCI WorldTeam Movistar Team. His brother Carlos also competes as a cyclist, and their father Félix García Casas is a former professional cyclist.

== Major results ==
=== Road ===
2019
3rd Road race, National Junior Championships
2020
1st Time trial, National Under-23 Championships
3rd Overall Vuelta a Zamora

1st Stage 4

2021
7th Overall Istrian Spring Trophy
2022 (1 pro win)
1st Time trial, National Championships
8th Time trial, UCI World Under-23 Championships
2023
1st Young rider classification, Tour of Slovenia
4th Time trial, UCI World Under-23 Championships
6th Overall Vuelta a Castilla y León
6th Time trial, UEC European Under-23 Championships
2024
3rd Time trial, National Championships
3rd Overall Tour de la Provence
9th Overall O Gran Camiño
10th Tour du Doubs
2024
5th Trofeo Serra Tramuntana
2025 (1)
1st Stage 1 (ITT) Route d'Occitanie
3rd Time trial, National Championships
6th Overall Tour de la Provence

1st Young rider classification

2026 (1)
1st Stage 5 Volta a la Comunitat Valenciana
5th Time trial, National Championships

==== Grand Tour general classification results timeline ====
| Grand Tour | 2022 | 2023 | 2024 | 2025 |
|---|---|---|---|---|
| Giro d'Italia | — | — | — | — |
| Tour de France | — | — | 98 | 26 |
| Vuelta a España | 47 | — | — | |

Legend
| — | Did not compete |
| DNF | Did not finish |

=== Track ===
2019
3rd Scratch, UEC European Junior Championships
2020
3rd Points race, UCI World Junior Championships
3rd Elimination, UEC European Under-23 Championships
3rd Madison, National Championships (with Javier Ureña)
