= Jake Stewart (cyclist) =

British cyclist (born 1999)

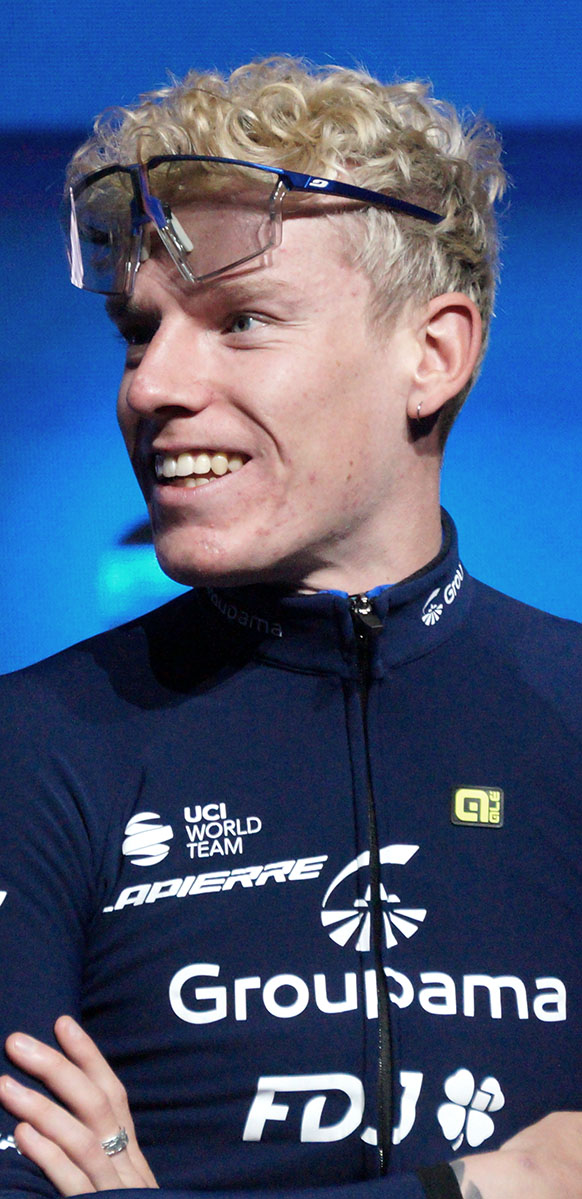
- Stewart in 2023

Personal information
- Full name: Thomas Jake Stewart
- Born: 2 October 1999 (age 27) Coventry, England
- Height: 1.75 m (5 ft 9 in)
- Weight: 66 kg (146 lb)

Cycling career
- Sport: Cycling
- Current team: NSN Cycling Team
- Disciplines: Road; Track
- Role: Rider
- Rider type: Classics specialist, lead-out

Amateur teams
- 2010–2015: Solihull Cycling Club
- 2016–2017: Swinnerton Cycles
- 2018: 100% Me

Professional teams
- 2019–2020: Équipe Continentale Groupama–FDJ
- 2020: Groupama–FDJ (development) (Note: Riding for Groupama–FDJ, Stewart competed at the Volta a Algarve, the Mont Ventoux Dénivelé Challenge, the Tour de l'Ain, the Tour du Limousin, the Grand Prix d'Isbergues, Paris–Camembert and Paris–Chauny, following the introduction of a UCI rule allowing riders registered with a development team to participate in UCI ProSeries or Class 1 events.)
- 2020–2023: Groupama–FDJ
- 2024–: Israel–Premier Tech

Thomas Jake Stewart (born 2 October 1999, in Coventry) is a British racing cyclist, who currently rides for UCI ProTeam NSN Cycling Team.

== Career ==
Stewart was initially due to join Groupama–FDJ for the 2021 season – having signed a two-year contract in August 2020 – but he was promoted from the Équipe Continentale Groupama–FDJ early, making his début at Gent–Wevelgem. In 2021, he finished second at the Omloop Het Nieuwsblad. The following season, he took his first pro win on stage one of the Tour de l'Ain and competed in his first Grand Tour: the Vuelta a España. In 2023, he finished in the top ten on two stages of the Giro d'Italia, before again winning the opening stage of the Tour de l'Ain.

In 2024, Stewart joined Israel–Premier Tech on a two-year contract.

== Major results ==
=== Road ===
2016
3rd Overall Junior Tour of Wales
2017
5th Road race, UCI World Junior Championships
2018
2nd Kattekoers
3rd Trofeo Piva
2019
3rd Road race, National Under-23 Championships
3rd Ronde van Vlaanderen Beloften
3rd Eschborn–Frankfurt Under-23
5th Overall Le Triptyque des Monts et Châteaux
8th Paris–Roubaix Espoirs
2020
2nd Overall Tour de Limousin

1st Young rider classification

2021
2nd Omloop Het Nieuwsblad
4th Overall Étoile de Bessèges

1st Young rider classification

6th Nokere Koerse
2022 (1 pro win)
1st Stage 1 Tour de l'Ain
3rd Overall Four Days of Dunkirk

1st Young rider classification

3rd Grand Prix du Morbihan
6th Overall Boucles de la Mayenne

1st Young rider classification

8th Overall Tour of Britain
8th Binche–Chimay–Binche
2023 (1)
1st Stage 1 Tour de l'Ain
2024
8th Super 8 Classic
8th Circuit de Wallonie
10th Elfstedenronde
2025 (2)
1st Stage 5 Critérium du Dauphiné
1st Stage 5 Four Days of Dunkirk
7th Overall Tour de la Provence

==== Grand Tour general classification results timeline ====
Grand Tour	2022	2023	2024	2025	2026
Giro d'Italia	—	92	—	—	DNF
Tour de France	—	—	DNF	108	
Vuelta a España	DNF	—	—	129	

Legend
—	Did not compete
DNF	Did not finish

=== Track ===
2016
3rd Madison, National Championships (with Fred Wright)
2017
National Junior Championships

1st Madison (with Rhys Britton)
2nd Scratch

2nd Madison, National Championships (with Joe Holt)
UEC European Junior Championships

2nd Team pursuit
3rd Madison (with Rhys Britton)

2018
1st Team pursuit, National Championships
