= Damien Girard =

French cyclist (2001–2026)

Personal information
- Born: 14 December 2001 Tours, France
- Died: 28 September 2026 (aged 24)

Cycling career
- Sport: Cycling
- Current team: Nice Métropole Côte d'Azur
- Discipline: Road
- Role: Rider

Amateur team
- 2020–2022: CC Nogent-sur-Oise

Professional team
- 2023–: Nice Métropole Côte d'Azur

Damien Girard (14 December 2001 – 28 September 2026) was a French professional racing cyclist, who rode for UCI Continental Nice Métropole Côte d'Azur.

== Biography ==
Girard competed in his first cycling races representing UC Vendôme. He subsequently joined Peltrax-CS-Damarie-lès-Lys in the Paris Region, acting on the advice of his coach, Samuel Plouhinec. A talented regional rider, he claimed twenty-seven victories in the cadet ranks (under-17s). The following year, he moved up to the junior category and won nine races, three of wich were at the national level.

In 2019, he raced first for VC Pays De Loudéac, then for CM Aubervilliers 93 starting in August. Described as a "puncheur-climber" he distinguished himself at the national level by securing further victories and various top-ten finishes. He also earned his first call-up to the French national team for the Tour du Pays de Vaud, a round of the Junior Nations' Cup, finishing in 18th place. Following these strong results, he was signed in 2020 by CC Nogent-sur-Oise, a team competing in the National Division.

During the 2022 season, he won the general classification of the Tour Nivernais Morvan, his first victory at the highest amateur level. He also finished second in the Hauts-de-France time trial championship, behind his teammate Romain Bacon.

He finally turned professional in 2023 with the Nice Métropole Côte d'Azur team, which holds a Continental license. He made his season debut in February at the Étoile de Bessèges- Tour du Gard. In the spring, he took part in various breakways at the Tro Bro León, the Four Days of Dunkirk, and the Giro dell' Apppennino.

In 2024, he won Stage 4 of the Tour du Maroc, securing his first professional victory in the process.

Girard died on 28 September 2026, at the age of 24.

== Major results ==
2018
1st Stage 1 La Cantonale Juniors
4th Overall Tour de l'Eure Juniors
5th Flèche Plédranaise
6th Overall Route d'Éole Juniors
8th Overall Tour de la Vallée de la Trambouze
8th Overall Arguenon-Vallée Verte
2019
1st Ronde du Printemps
1st Stage 1 Arguenon-Vallée Verte
3rd Overall Route d'Éole Juniors
5th Overall Grand Prix Fernand-Durel
6th Overall Tour de l'Eure Juniors
6th Trophée Louison-Bobet
7th Overall La Cantonale Juniors
2020
10th Pierre de Crazannes
2021
2nd Grand Prix d'Oradour-sur-Vayres
2nd GP de la Roche aux Fées
2nd Chrono Châtelleraudais
3rd GP de Saint-Michel
3rd Anjou Pays de la Loire
5th Prix des Grandes-Ventes
8th Grand Prix des Marbriers
9th Overall Trois Jours de Cherbourg
2022
1st Overall Tour Nivernais Morvan
2nd Grand Prix Roland Chollet à Theneuil
4th Boucles du Haut-Var
4th Boucles de l'Austreberthe
5th GP Neufchatel-en-Saosnois
5th GP de la Roche aux Fées
5th GP de la Sainte-Anne
2024
1st Stage 4 Tour du Maroc
10th Grand Prix La Marseillaise
2025
1st Mountains classification, Tour de la Provence
