= Tour de la Provence =

Stage race of male road cycling

Race details
- Date: February
- Region: Bouches-du-Rhône
- English name: Tour La Provence
- Discipline: Road
- Competition: UCI Europe Tour
- Type: Stage race
- Organiser: La Provence
- Race director: Serge Pascal
- Web site: tourdelaprovence.fr

History
- First edition: 2016
- Editions: 10 (as of 2026)
- First winner: Thomas Voeckler (FRA)
- Most wins: Nairo Quintana (COL); Mads Pedersen (DEN) (2 wins)
- Most recent: Matthew Riccitello (USA)

The Tour de la Provence is an early-season bicycle stage race in the Provence region of France. It is organized by southern French newspaper La Provence, which serves as the race's title sponsor for its first three years. It is held in February, as a 2.1 event on the UCI Europe Tour calendar. and became part of the UCI ProSeries in 2020. La Provence has entrusted the organization of the event to Serge Pascal, who also organizes the Tour du Haut Var. The inaugural edition of 2016 was won by Thomas Voeckler.

== History ==
Organizers intend to build on the tradition of the former Tour du Vaucluse and the Tour du Sud-Est, two races in the same region that had their last editions in 1998 and 1983 respectively. The event is part of a series of cycling stage races being held in the south of France in February, following the Étoile de Bessèges, La Méditerranéenne and the Tour du Haut Var. The Tour La Provence takes place mid-week between the Tour du Haut-Var and the Classic Sud-Ardèche. These races are competed mainly by French teams and are considered early-season preparations for Paris–Nice, the first, multi-stage European World Tour race in March.

== Route ==
The race is run over three stages in the Bouches-du-Rhône department of the Provence-Alpes-Côte d'Azur region, in the south of France.

== Winners ==
Year	Country	Rider	Team
2016	France	Thomas Voeckler	Direct Énergie
2017	Australia	Rohan Dennis	BMC Racing Team
2018	France	Alexandre Geniez	AG2R La Mondiale
2019	Spain	Gorka Izagirre	Astana
2020	Colombia	Nairo Quintana	Arkéa–Samsic
2021	Colombia	Iván Sosa	Ineos Grenadiers
2022	Colombia	Nairo Quintana	Arkéa–Samsic
2023	No race		
2024	Denmark	Mads Pedersen	Lidl–Trek
2025	Denmark	Mads Pedersen	Lidl–Trek
2026	United States	Matthew Riccitello	Decathlon CMA CGM

== Classifications ==
As of the 2025 edition, the jerseys worn by the leaders of the individual classifications are:

- Teal Jersey – Worn by the leader of the general classification.
- Light Blue Jersey – Worn by the leader of the points classification.
- Polkadot Jersey – Worn by the leader of the climber classification.
- White Jersey – Worn by the best rider under 23 years of age on the overall classification.
- Rose Jersey – Worn by the People's Favourite rider award.
