= 2025 Tro-Bro Léon =

2025 UCI ProSeries

Race details
- Dates: 11 May 2025
- Stages: 1
- Distance: 203.8 km (126.6 mi)
- Winning time: 4h 43' 14"

Results
	Winner	Bastien Tronchon (FRA)	(Decathlon–AG2R La Mondiale)
	Second	Pierre Gautherat (FRA)	(Decathlon–AG2R La Mondiale)
	Third	Valentin Madouas (FRA)	(Groupama–FDJ)

The 2025 Tro-Bro Léon was the 41st edition of Tro-Bro Léon, a one-day road cycling race in and around Lannilis, in the northwestern French region of Brittany, that took place on 11 May 2025.

== Teams ==
Eight of the eighteen UCI WorldTeams, ten UCI ProTeams, and four UCI Continental teams made up the 22 teams that participated in the race.

UCI WorldTeams

- Arkéa–B&B Hotels
- Cofidis
- Decathlon–AG2R La Mondiale
- Groupama–FDJ
- Intermarché–Wanty
- Movistar Team
- Team Bahrain Victorious
- XDS Astana Team

UCI ProTeams

- Burgos Burpellet BH
- Equipo Kern Pharma
- Euskaltel–Euskadi
- Israel–Premier Tech
- Lotto
- Team TotalEnergies
- Tudor Pro Cycling Team
- Unibet Tietema Rockets
- Uno-X Mobility
- Wagner Bazin WB

UCI Continental Teams

- CIC–U–Nantes
- Nice Métropole Côte d'Azur
- St. Michel–Preference Home–Auber93
- Van Rysel–Roubaix

== Result ==
Result
Rank	Rider	Team	Time
1	Bastien Tronchon (FRA)	Decathlon–AG2R La Mondiale	4h 43' 14"
2	Pierre Gautherat (FRA)	Decathlon–AG2R La Mondiale	+ 0"
3	Valentin Madouas (FRA)	Groupama–FDJ	+ 19"
4	Anthony Turgis (FRA)	Team TotalEnergies	+ 19"
5	Fredrik Dversnes (NOR)	Uno-X Mobility	+ 32"
6	Cees Bol (NED)	XDS Astana Team	+ 38"
7	Rasmus Tiller (NOR)	Uno-X Mobility	+ 38"
8	Fred Wright (GBR)	Team Bahrain Victorious	+ 38"
9	Lucas Eriksson (SWE)	Tudor Pro Cycling Team	+ 38"
10	Kévin Vauquelin (FRA)	Arkéa–B&B Hotels	+ 38"
