= Pierre Gautherat =

French cyclist

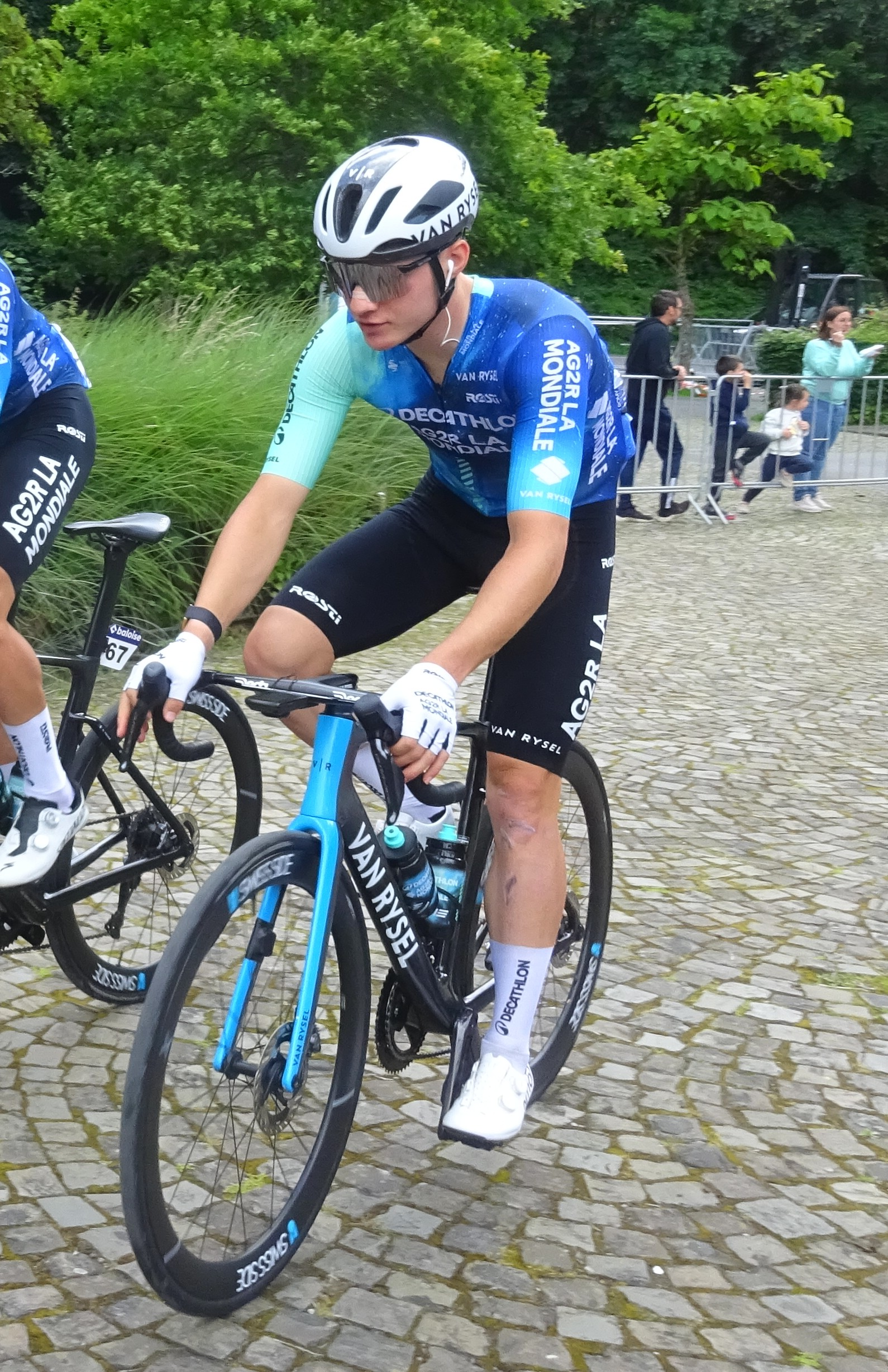
- Pierre Gautherat, Tour of Belgium 2024

Personal information
- Born: 16 January 2003 (age 23) Colmar, France
- Height: 1.77 m (5 ft 10 in)
- Weight: 70 kg (154 lb; 11 st 0 lb)

Cycling career
- Sport: Cycling
- Current team: Decathlon CMA CGM Team
- Disciplines: Road; Cyclo-cross
- Role: Rider
- Rider type: Classics specialist

Amateur teams
- 2020–2021: Van Rysel–AG2R La Mondiale
- 2022: SCO Dijon–Team Material-velo.com

Professional teams
- 2022: AG2R Citroën Team (stagiaire)
- 2023–: AG2R Citroën Team

Pierre Gautherat (French: [pjɛʁ ɡotʁa]; born 16 January 2003) is a French cyclist, who currently rides for UCI WorldTeam Decathlon CMA CGM Team.

== Major results ==
2020
3rd Time trial, National Junior Road Championships
2021
2nd Road race, National Junior Road Championships
2022
10th Primus Classic
2023
Grand Prix Jeseníky

1st Points classification
1st Prologue & Stage 1

5th Heistse Pijl
7th Le Samyn
9th Cholet-Pays de la Loire
10th Road race, UCI Road World Under-23 Championships
2024
2nd Gran Premio Castellón
3rd Tro-Bro Léon
4th Grand Prix La Marseillaise
4th Grand Prix d'Isbergues
6th Overall Tour de la Provence

1st Young rider classification

8th Road race, UEC European Under-23 Road Championships
9th Kampioenschap van Vlaanderen
2025 (1 pro win)
1st Stage 3 Four Days of Dunkirk
2nd Tro-Bro Léon
2026 (1)
1st Paris–Camembert
2nd Classique Dunkerque
4th Tro-Bro Léon
