= Sander De Pestel =

Belgian cyclist

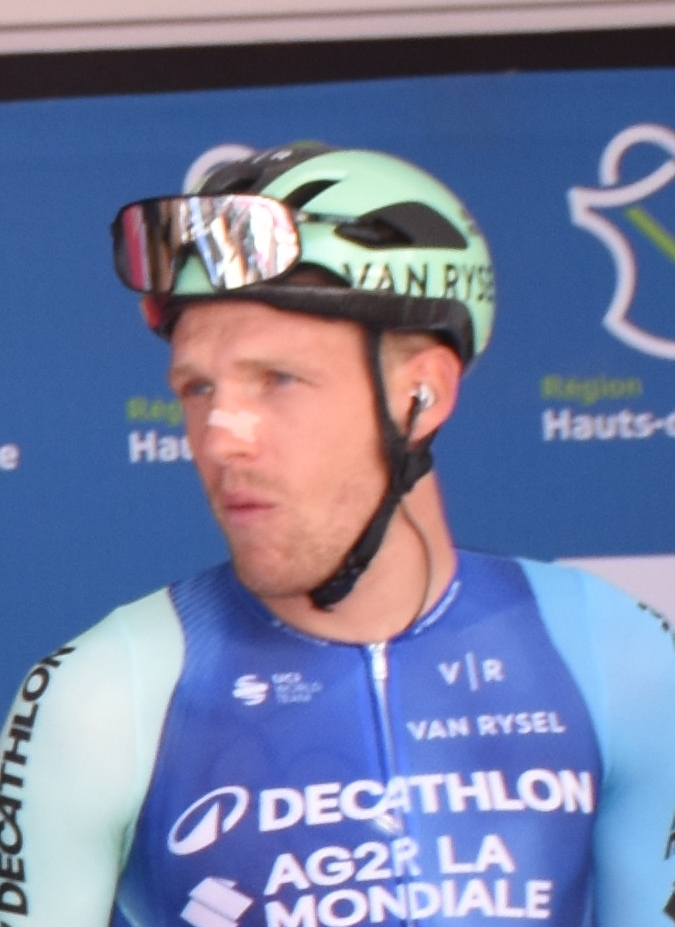
- De Pestel in 2025

Personal information
- Born: 11 October 1998 (age 28) Sint-Niklaas, Belgium
- Height: 1.84 m (6 ft 0 in)
- Weight: 74 kg (163 lb)

Cycling career
- Sport: Cycling
- Current team: Decathlon CMA CGM Team
- Discipline: Road
- Role: Rider

Amateur team
- 2017–2019: Lotto–Soudal U23

Professional teams
- 2020–2023: Sport Vlaanderen–Baloise
- 2024–: Decathlon–AG2R La Mondiale

Sander De Pestel (born 11 October 1998) is a Belgian professional racing cyclist, who currently rides for UCI WorldTeam Decathlon CMA CGM Team.

== Major results ==
2015
2nd Overall Sint-Martinusprijs Kontich

1st Young rider classification
1st Stage 2

2nd Omloop Het Nieuwsblad Juniors
4th Overall Keizer der Juniores
2016
1st Road race, National Junior Road Championships
1st Omloop Het Nieuwsblad Juniors
2017
1st Overall Ronde van Oost-Vlaanderen

1st Stage 2

1st Stage 1 (TTT) Okolo Jižních Čech
2018
1st Stage 1 (TTT) Okolo Jižních Čech
9th De Kustpijl
10th Grand Prix des Marbriers
2019
1st Overall Olympia's Tour
1st Wingene Koers
2nd Overall Tour de Namur

1st Stage 4

3rd Overall Ronde van Oost-Vlaanderen
6th Grand Prix de la ville de Nogent-sur-Oise
2023
6th Antwerp Port Epic
10th Ronde van Limburg
2024
5th Time trial, National Road Championships
9th Paris–Chauny
2025
4th Time trial, National Road Championships
8th Overall Tour de la Provence
2026
5th Time trial, National Road Championships
