= 2025 Four Days of Dunkirk =

French cycling race

2025 UCI ProSeries

Race details
- Dates: 14–18 May 2025
- Stages: 5
- Distance: 868.5 km (539.7 mi)
- Winning time: 19h 30' 05"

Results
Jersey awarded to the overall winner	Winner	Samuel Watson (GBR)	(INEOS Grenadiers)
	Second	Lewis Askey (GBR)	(Groupama–FDJ)
	Third	Carlos Canal (ESP)	(Movistar Team)
Jersey awarded to the points classification winner	Points	Tobias Lund Andresen (DEN)	(Team Picnic–PostNL)
Jersey awarded to the mountains classification winner	Mountains	Paul Hennequin (FRA)	(Wagner Bazin WB)
Jersey awarded to the young rider classification winner	Young rider	Samuel Watson (GBR)	(INEOS Grenadiers)
	Team	(France) Cofidis	

The 2025 Four Days of Dunkirk (French: Quatre Jours de Dunkerque 2025) was a road cycling stage race that took place between 14 and 18 May 2025 in the French administrative region of Hauts-de-France. The race was rated as a category 2.Pro event on the 2025 UCI ProSeries calendar, and was the 69th edition of the Four Days of Dunkirk.

== Teams ==
Eleven UCI WorldTeams, nine UCI ProTeams and four UCI Continental teams make up the 24 teams that participated in the race.

UCI WorldTeams

- Arkéa–B&B Hotels
- Cofidis
- Decathlon–AG2R La Mondiale
- Groupama–FDJ
- INEOS Grenadiers
- Intermarché–Wanty
- Movistar Team
- Soudal–Quick-Step
- Team Picnic–PostNL
- Visma–Lease a Bike
- XDS Astana Team

UCI ProTeams

- Caja Rural–Seguros RGA
- Euskaltel–Euskadi
- Israel–Premier Tech
- Lotto
- Team TotalEnergies
- Tudor Pro Cycling Team
- Unibet Tietema Rockets
- Uno-X Mobility
- Wagner Bazin WB

UCI Continental Teams

- CIC–U–Nantes
- Nice Métropole Côte d'Azur
- St. Michel–Preference Home–Auber93
- Van Rysel–Roubaix

== Route ==
Stage characteristics and winners
Stage	Date	Course	Distance	Type	Stage winner
1	14 May	Sainte-Catherine to Amiens	177.3 km (110.2 mi)	Flat stage	Axel Zingle (FRA)
2	15 May	Avesnes-sur-Helpe to Crépy-en-Valois	178.7 km (111.0 mi)	Hilly stage	Lewis Askey (GBR)
3	16 May	Valenciennes to Famars	154.2 km (95.8 mi)	Flat stage	Pierre Gautherat (FRA)
4	17 May	La Chapelle-d'Armentières to Cassel	172.7 km (107.3 mi)	Hilly stage	Samuel Watson (GBR)
5	18 May	Wormhout to Dunkerque	185.6 km (115.3 mi)	Flat stage	Jake Stewart (GBR)
Total			868.5 km (539.7 mi)		

== Stages ==
=== Stage 1 ===
14 May 2025 – Sainte-Catherine to Amiens, 177.3 km (110.2 mi)

Stage 1 Result
Rank	Rider	Team	Time
1	Axel Zingle (FRA)	Visma–Lease a Bike	3h 51' 10"
2	Tobias Lund Andresen (DEN)	Team Picnic–PostNL	+ 0"
3	Stian Fredheim (NOR)	Uno-X Mobility	+ 0"
4	Pascal Ackermann (GER)	Israel–Premier Tech	+ 0"
5	Martijn Budding (NED)	Unibet Tietema Rockets	+ 0"
6	Jason Tesson (FRA)	Team TotalEnergies	+ 0"
7	Jon Aberasturi (ESP)	Euskaltel–Euskadi	+ 0"
8	Matthew Walls (GBR)	Groupama–FDJ	+ 0"
9	Jenno Berckmoes (BEL)	Lotto	+ 0"
10	Mike Teunissen (NED)	XDS Astana Team	+ 0"

General classification after Stage 1
Rank	Rider	Team	Time
1	Axel Zingle (FRA)	Visma–Lease a Bike	3h 51' 00"
2	Ben Swift (GBR)	INEOS Grenadiers	+ 2"
3	Per Strand Hagenes (NOR)	Visma–Lease a Bike	+ 3"
4	Tobias Lund Andresen (DEN)	Team Picnic–PostNL	+ 4"
5	Stian Fredheim (NOR)	Uno-X Mobility	+ 6"
6	Gil Gelders (BEL)	Soudal–Quick-Step	+ 7"
7	Pascal Ackermann (GER)	Israel–Premier Tech	+ 10"
8	Martijn Budding (NED)	Unibet Tietema Rockets	+ 10"
9	Jason Tesson (FRA)	Team TotalEnergies	+ 10"
10	Jon Aberasturi (ESP)	Euskaltel–Euskadi	+ 10"

=== Stage 2 ===
15 May 2025 – Avesnes-sur-Helpe to Crépy-en-Valois, 178.7 km (111.0 mi)

Stage 2 Result
Rank	Rider	Team	Time
1	Lewis Askey (GBR)	Groupama–FDJ	3h 51' 36"
2	Sakarias Koller Løland (NOR)	Uno-X Mobility	+ 0"
3	Samuel Watson (GBR)	INEOS Grenadiers	+ 0"
4	Axel Zingle (FRA)	Visma–Lease a Bike	+ 0"
5	Matys Grisel (FRA)	Lotto	+ 0"
6	Alberto Dainese (ITA)	Tudor Pro Cycling Team	+ 0"
7	Cedric Beullens (BEL)	Lotto	+ 0"
8	Bryan Coquard (FRA)	Cofidis	+ 0"
9	Jake Stewart (GBR)	Israel–Premier Tech	+ 0"
10	Pierre Gautherat (FRA)	Decathlon–AG2R La Mondiale	+ 0"

General classification after Stage 2
Rank	Rider	Team	Time
1	Axel Zingle (FRA)	Visma–Lease a Bike	7h 42' 36"
2	Lewis Askey (GBR)	Groupama–FDJ	+ 0"
3	Ben Swift (GBR)	INEOS Grenadiers	+ 2"
4	Nans Peters (FRA)	Decathlon–AG2R La Mondiale	+ 2"
5	Per Strand Hagenes (NOR)	Visma–Lease a Bike	+ 3"
6	Tobias Lund Andresen (DEN)	Team Picnic–PostNL	+ 4"
7	Sakarias Koller Løland (NOR)	Uno-X Mobility	+ 4"
8	Stian Fredheim (NOR)	Uno-X Mobility	+ 6"
9	Samuel Watson (GBR)	INEOS Grenadiers	+ 6"
10	Gil Gelders (BEL)	Soudal–Quick-Step	+ 7"

=== Stage 3 ===
16 May 2025 – Valenciennes to Famars, 154.2 km (95.8 mi)

Stage 3 Result
Rank	Rider	Team	Time
1	Pierre Gautherat (FRA)	Decathlon–AG2R La Mondiale	3h 22' 35"
2	Jake Stewart (GBR)	Israel–Premier Tech	+ 0"
3	Axel Zingle (FRA)	Visma–Lease a Bike	+ 0"
4	Tobias Lund Andresen (DEN)	Team Picnic–PostNL	+ 0"
5	Lewis Askey (GBR)	Groupama–FDJ	+ 0"
6	Alberto Dainese (ITA)	Tudor Pro Cycling Team	+ 0"
7	Benjamin Thomas (FRA)	Cofidis	+ 0"
8	Samuel Leroux (FRA)	Team TotalEnergies	+ 0"
9	Jordi Warlop (BEL)	Soudal–Quick-Step	+ 0"
10	Matys Grisel (FRA)	Lotto	+ 0"

General classification after Stage 3
Rank	Rider	Team	Time
1	Axel Zingle (FRA)	Visma–Lease a Bike	11h 05' 07"
2	Pierre Gautherat (FRA)	Decathlon–AG2R La Mondiale	+ 4"
3	Lewis Askey (GBR)	Groupama–FDJ	+ 4"
4	Ben Swift (GBR)	INEOS Grenadiers	+ 6"
5	Nans Peters (FRA)	Decathlon–AG2R La Mondiale	+ 6"
6	Per Strand Hagenes (NOR)	Visma–Lease a Bike	+ 7"
7	Tobias Lund Andresen (DEN)	Team Picnic–PostNL	+ 8"
8	Jake Stewart (GBR)	Israel–Premier Tech	+ 8"
9	Sakarias Koller Løland (NOR)	Uno-X Mobility	+ 8"
10	Samuel Watson (GBR)	INEOS Grenadiers	+ 8"

=== Stage 4 ===
17 May 2025 – La Chapelle-d'Armentières to Cassel, 172.7 km (107.3 mi)

Stage 4 Result
Rank	Rider	Team	Time
1	Samuel Watson (GBR)	INEOS Grenadiers	4h 17' 01"
2	Carlos Canal (ESP)	Movistar Team	+ 0"
3	Lewis Askey (GBR)	Groupama–FDJ	+ 3"
4	Alexandre Delettre (FRA)	Team TotalEnergies	+ 5"
5	Tobias Lund Andresen (DEN)	Team Picnic–PostNL	+ 5"
6	Victor Langellotti (MON)	INEOS Grenadiers	+ 6"
7	Per Strand Hagenes (NOR)	Visma–Lease a Bike	+ 6"
8	Benjamin Thomas (FRA)	Cofidis	+ 6"
9	Thibaud Gruel (FRA)	Groupama–FDJ	+ 8"
10	Nicolas Breuillard (FRA)	St. Michel–Preference Home–Auber93	+ 8"

General classification after Stage 4
Rank	Rider	Team	Time
1	Samuel Watson (GBR)	INEOS Grenadiers	15h 22' 08"
2	Lewis Askey (GBR)	Groupama–FDJ	+ 3"
3	Carlos Canal (ESP)	Movistar Team	+ 8"
4	Tobias Lund Andresen (DEN)	Team Picnic–PostNL	+ 13"
5	Per Strand Hagenes (NOR)	Visma–Lease a Bike	+ 13"
6	Alexandre Delettre (FRA)	Team TotalEnergies	+ 19"
7	Benjamin Thomas (FRA)	Cofidis	+ 20"
8	Victor Langellotti (MON)	INEOS Grenadiers	+ 20"
9	Nans Peters (FRA)	Decathlon–AG2R La Mondiale	+ 20"
10	Thibaud Gruel (FRA)	Groupama–FDJ	+ 22"

=== Stage 5 ===
18 May 2025 – Wormhout to Dunkerque, 185.6 km (115.3 mi)

Stage 5 Result
Rank	Rider	Team	Time
1	Jake Stewart (GBR)	Israel–Premier Tech	4h 07' 57"
2	Alberto Dainese (ITA)	Tudor Pro Cycling Team	+ 0"
3	Thibaud Gruel (FRA)	Groupama–FDJ	+ 0"
4	Tobias Lund Andresen (DEN)	Team Picnic–PostNL	+ 0"
5	Daniel McLay (GBR)	Visma–Lease a Bike	+ 0"
6	Alexander Konijn (NED)	Nice Métropole Côte d'Azur	+ 0"
7	Mike Teunissen (NED)	XDS Astana Team	+ 0"
8	Erlend Blikra (NOR)	Uno-X Mobility	+ 0"
9	Gianluca Pollefliet (BEL)	Decathlon–AG2R La Mondiale	+ 0"
10	Romain Cardis (FRA)	St. Michel–Preference Home–Auber93	+ 0"

General classification after Stage 5
Rank	Rider	Team	Time
1	Samuel Watson (GBR)	INEOS Grenadiers	19h 30' 05"
2	Lewis Askey (GBR)	Groupama–FDJ	+ 4"
3	Carlos Canal (ESP)	Movistar Team	+ 11"
4	Tobias Lund Andresen (DEN)	Team Picnic–PostNL	+ 12"
5	Per Strand Hagenes (NOR)	Visma–Lease a Bike	+ 16"
6	Thibaud Gruel (FRA)	Groupama–FDJ	+ 18"
7	Alexandre Delettre (FRA)	Team TotalEnergies	+ 22"
8	Benjamin Thomas (FRA)	Cofidis	+ 23"
9	Victor Langellotti (MON)	INEOS Grenadiers	+ 23"
10	Nans Peters (FRA)	Decathlon–AG2R La Mondiale	+ 23"

== Classification leadership table ==
Classification leadership by stage
Stage	Winner	General classification	Points classification	Mountains classification	Young rider classification	Team classification
1	Axel Zingle	Axel Zingle	Axel Zingle	Danny van der Tuuk	Per Strand Hagenes	Lotto
2	Lewis Askey	Axel Zingle	Axel Zingle	Kenny Molly	Lewis Askey	Lotto
3	Pierre Gautherat	Axel Zingle	Axel Zingle	Kenny Molly	Pierre Gautherat	Lotto
4	Samuel Watson	Samuel Watson	Lewis Askey	Paul Hennequin	Samuel Watson	Cofidis
5	Jake Stewart	Samuel Watson	Tobias Lund Andresen	Paul Hennequin	Samuel Watson	Cofidis
Final		Samuel Watson	Tobias Lund Andresen	Paul Hennequin	Samuel Watson	Cofidis

== Classification standings ==
Legend
Denotes the winner of the general classification	Denotes the winner of the mountains classification
Denotes the winner of the points classification	Denotes the winner of the young rider classification
Denotes the winner of the team classification	

=== General classification ===
Final general classification (1–10)
Rank	Rider	Team	Time
1	Samuel Watson (GBR)	INEOS Grenadiers	19h 30' 05"
2	Lewis Askey (GBR)	Groupama–FDJ	+ 4"
3	Carlos Canal (ESP)	Movistar Team	+ 11"
4	Tobias Lund Andresen (DEN)	Team Picnic–PostNL	+ 12"
5	Per Strand Hagenes (NOR)	Visma–Lease a Bike	+ 16"
6	Thibaud Gruel (FRA)	Groupama–FDJ	+ 18"
7	Alexandre Delettre (FRA)	Team TotalEnergies	+ 22"
8	Benjamin Thomas (FRA)	Cofidis	+ 23"
9	Victor Langellotti (ITA)	INEOS Grenadiers	+ 23"
10	Nans Peters (FRA)	Decathlon–AG2R La Mondiale	+ 23"

=== Points classification ===
Final points classification (1–10)
Rank	Rider	Team	Points
1	Tobias Lund Andresen (DEN)	Team Picnic–PostNL	33
2	Lewis Askey (GBR)	Groupama–FDJ	32
3	Jake Stewart (GBR)	Israel–Premier Tech	29
4	Samuel Watson (GBR)	INEOS Grenadiers	27
5	Alberto Dainese (ITA)	Tudor Pro Cycling Team	22
6	Pierre Gautherat (FRA)	Decathlon–AG2R La Mondiale	16
7	Carlos Canal (ESP)	Movistar Team	12
8	Sakarias Koller Løland (NOR)	Uno-X Mobility	12
9	Per Strand Hagenes (NOR)	Visma–Lease a Bike	11
10	Thibaud Gruel (FRA)	Groupama–FDJ	11

=== Mountains classification ===
Final mountains classification (1–10)
Rank	Rider	Team	Points
1	Paul Hennequin (FRA)	Euskaltel–Euskadi	19
2	Kenny Molly (BEL)	Van Rysel–Roubaix	15
3	Tom Portsmouth (GBR)	Wagner Bazin WB	13
4	Gil Gelders (BEL)	Soudal–Quick-Step	9
5	Luca De Meester (BEL)	Wagner Bazin WB	9
6	Victor Papon (FRA)	Wagner Bazin WB	7
7	Matis Louvel (FRA)	Israel–Premier Tech	6
8	Axel Narbonne Zuccarelli (FRA)	Nice Métropole Côte d'Azur	5
9	Sam Maisonobe (FRA)	Cofidis	4
10	Ben Swift (GBR)	INEOS Grenadiers	4

=== Young rider classification ===
Final young rider classification (1–10)
Rank	Rider	Team	Time
1	Samuel Watson (GBR)	INEOS Grenadiers	19h 30' 05"
2	Lewis Askey (GBR)	Groupama–FDJ	+ 4"
3	Carlos Canal (ESP)	Movistar Team	+ 11"
4	Tobias Lund Andresen (DEN)	Team Picnic–PostNL	+ 12"
5	Per Strand Hagenes (NOR)	Visma–Lease a Bike	+ 16"
6	Thibaud Gruel (FRA)	Groupama–FDJ	+ 18"
7	Sam Maisonobe (FRA)	Cofidis	+ 32"
8	Sakarias Koller Løland (NOR)	Uno-X Mobility	+ 33"
9	Alec Segaert (BEL)	Lotto	+ 43"
10	Jenno Berckmoes (BEL)	Lotto	+ 46"

=== Team classification ===
Final team classification (1–10)
Rank	Team	Time
1	(France) Cofidis	58h 31' 51"
2	(France) Team TotalEnergies	+ 1"
3	(United Kingdom) INEOS Grenadiers	+ 16"
4	(France) Groupama–FDJ	+ 30"
5	(Belgium) Soudal–Quick-Step	+ 5' 02"
6	(Belgium) Lotto	+ 8' 22"
7	(Spain) Movistar Team	+ 8' 27"
8	(France) Unibet Tietema Rockets	+ 10' 01"
9	(Netherlands) Team Picnic–PostNL	+ 11' 36"
10	(France) Decathlon–AG2R La Mondiale	+ 15' 52"
