= Thibaud Gruel =

French cyclist

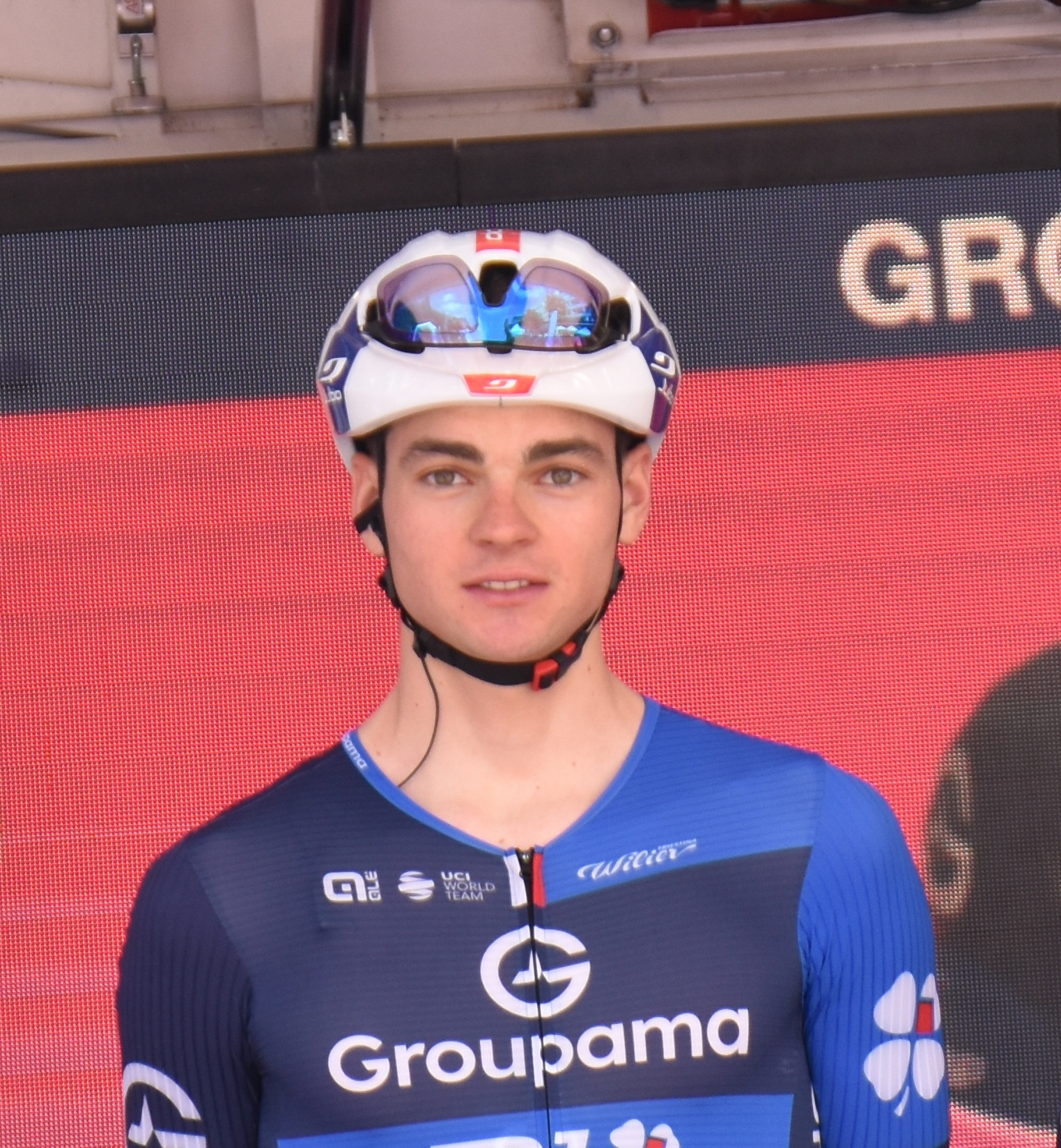
- Gruel at Four Days of Dunkirk 2025

Personal information
- Born: 1 May 2004 (age 22) Tours, France
- Height: 1.80 m (5 ft 11 in)
- Weight: 70 kg (154 lb)

Cycling career
- Sport: Cycling
- Current team: Groupama–FDJ United
- Disciplines: Road; Cyclo-cross
- Role: Rider

Amateur team
- 2021–2022: CREF Pays de la Loire

Professional teams
- 2023–2024: Équipe Continentale Groupama–FDJ
- 2024–: Groupama–FDJ

Thibaud Gruel (born 1 May 2004) is a French cyclist, who currently rides for UCI WorldTeam Groupama–FDJ United.

== Major results ==
2021
1st Stage 1 La Philippe Gilbert Juniors
3rd Bernaudeau Junior
4th Time trial, National Junior Road Championships
2022
1st Time trial, National Junior Road Championships
1st Stage 4 Giro della Lunigiana
2nd Overall Saarland Trofeo
3rd Overall La Philippe Gilbert Juniors
3rd Kuurne–Brussels–Kuurne Juniors
5th Bernaudeau Junior
UCI World Junior Road Championships

7th Road race
10th Time trial

7th Time trial, UEC European Junior Road Championships
8th Overall Vuelta Junior a la Ribera del Duero
2023
3rd Overall Circuit des Ardennes

1st Points classification
1st Young rider classification
1st Stage 3

3rd Poreč Trophy
8th Grand Prix de Plouay
10th Umag Trophy
2024
1st Stage 2 Circuit des Ardennes
8th Bretagne Classic
2025 (2 pro wins)
1st Stage 4 Route d'Occitanie
3rd Overall Boucles de la Mayenne

1st Young rider classification
1st Prologue

5th Paris–Tours
6th Overall Four Days of Dunkirk
6th Paris–Camembert
9th Overall Tour de la Provence
10th Tour du Finistère
2026 (1)
1st Stage 1 Route d'Occitanie
6th Classique Dunkerque
6th Flandrien 0.0 Classic
7th Paris–Tours
7th Binche–Chimay–Binche
10th Overall Four Days of Dunkirk

=== Grand Tour general classification results timeline ===
Grand Tour	2025
Giro d'Italia	—
Tour de France	—
Vuelta a España	103
