= Bastien Tronchon =

French cyclist

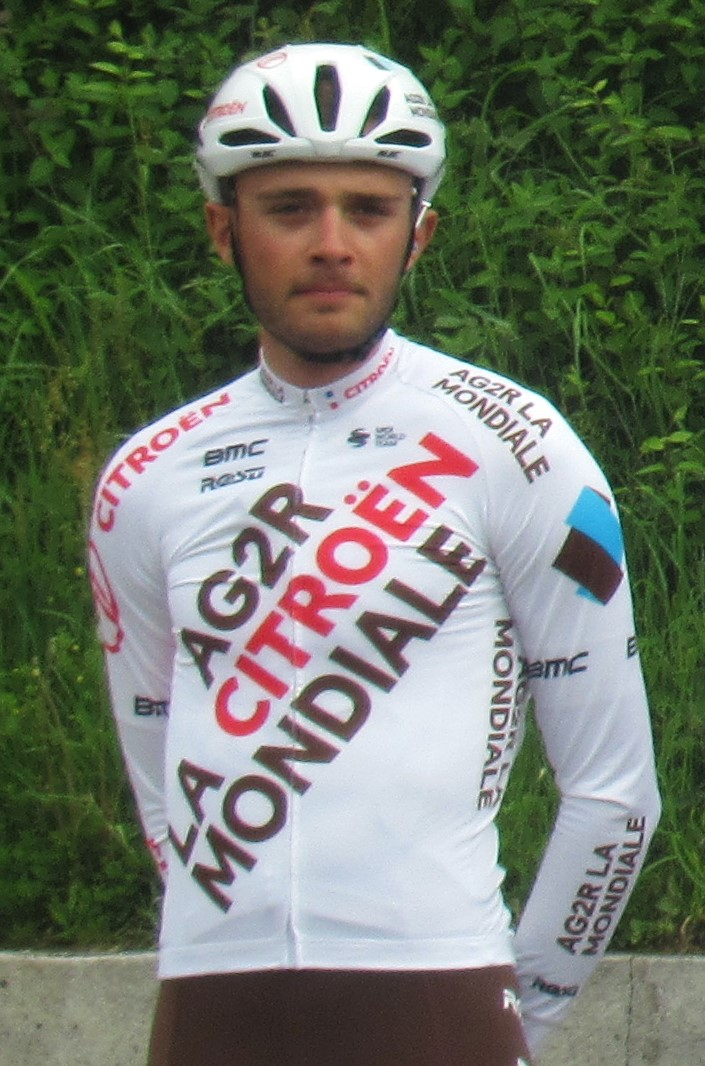

Personal information
- Born: 29 March 2002 (age 24) Chambéry, France
- Weight: 70 kg (154 lb)

Cycling career
- Sport: Cycling
- Current team: Groupama–FDJ United
- Discipline: Road
- Role: Rider

Amateur team
- 2021–2022: AG2R Citroën U23 Team

Professional teams
- 2022: AG2R Citroën Team (stagiaire)
- 2023–2025: AG2R Citroën Team
- 2026–: Groupama–FDJ United

Major wins
- Grand Tours Vuelta a España 1 individual stage (2026) One-day races and Classics Tro-Bro Léon (2025)

Bastien Tronchon (born 29 March 2002) is a French cyclist, who currently rides for UCI WorldTeam Groupama–FDJ United.

On his third day of riding as a stagiaire for AG2R Citroën Team, Tronchon took a surprise victory on stage 3 of the 2022 Vuelta a Burgos after outsprinting Pavel Sivakov after being the only rider able to stick with Sivakov when he attacked 39 kilometers from the finish.

On 1 September 2026, Tronchon won stage 10 of the 2026 Vuelta a España, a hilly 184.7 km stage from Alcaraz to Elche de la Sierra. Racing for Groupama–FDJ United, he led in the closing metres to take the win in an uphill sprint, beating Wout van Aert and holding off other high-profile finishers including Magnus Cort and Thibau Nys. It was Tronchon's first Grand Tour stage victory, coming the day after the race's first rest day, in a stage many had expected to suit Visma's sprint duo of Van Aert and Matthew Brennan.

== Major results ==
2019
6th Overall Aubel–Thimister–Stavelot

1st Stage 2a (TTT)

2020
2nd Road race, National Junior Road Championships
10th Overall La Philippe Gilbert juniors
2021
6th Overall Circuit des Ardennes

1st Mountains classification

2022 (1 pro win)
1st Stage 3 Vuelta a Burgos
3rd Overall Trois Jours de Cherbourg
3rd Overall Boucle de l'Artois
2024
2nd Clásica Jaén Paraíso Interior
5th Overall Tour des Alpes-Maritimes

1st Young rider classification

6th La Drôme Classic
7th Classic Var
2025 (1)
1st Tro-Bro Léon
2nd Tour du Finistère
5th Overall Tour Down Under
2026 (1)
1st 2026 Vuelta España Stage 10

=== Grand Tour general classification results timeline ===
Grand Tour	2024	2025
Giro d'Italia	88	—
Tour de France	—	77
Vuelta a España	—	—

Legend
—	Did not compete
DNF	Did not finish
