= Paul Hennequin =

French cyclist (born 2002)

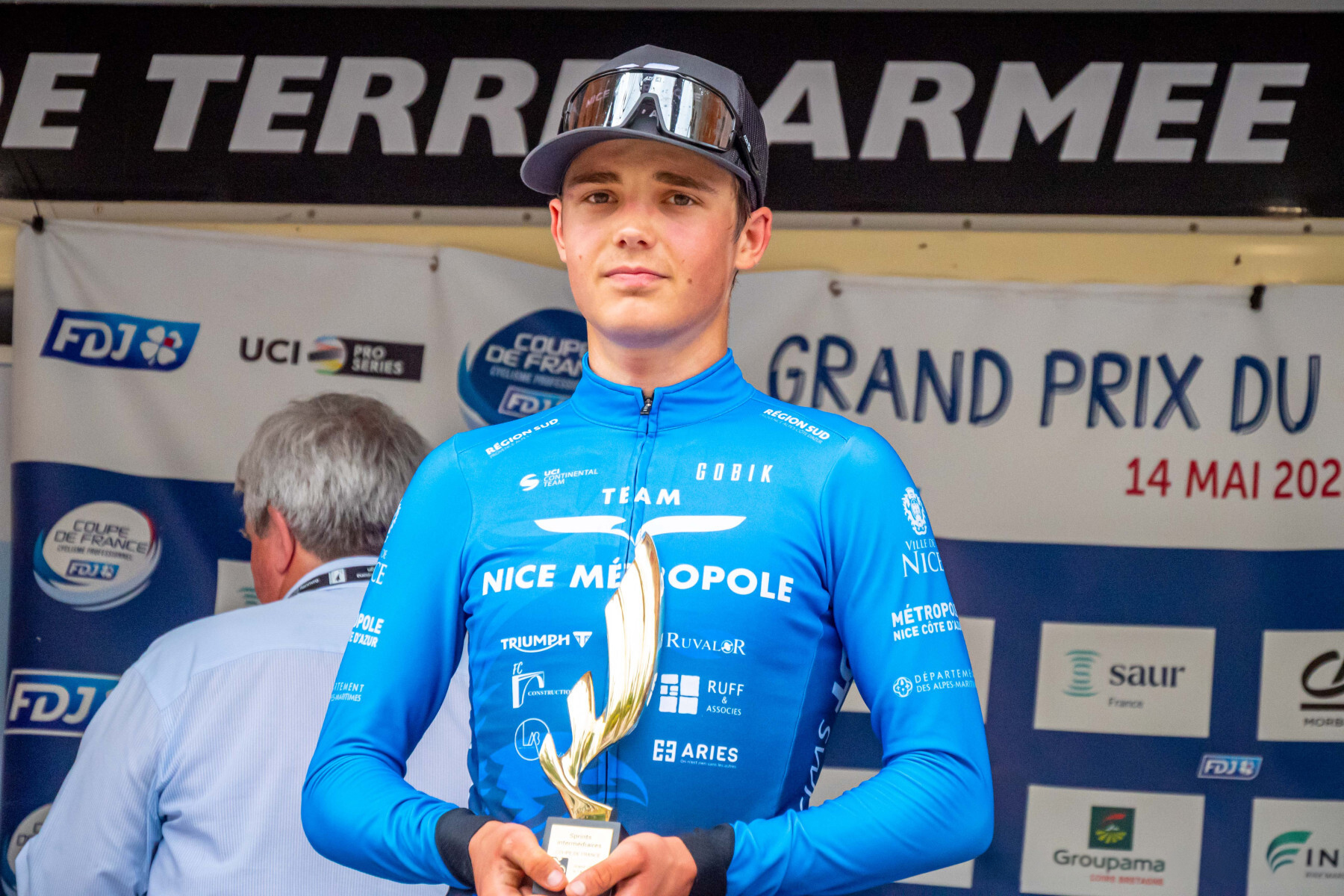

Personal information
- Born: 9 December 2002 (age 23) Bordeaux, France
- Height: 1.75 m (5 ft 9 in)
- Weight: 64 kg (141 lb)

Cycling career
- Sport: Cycling
- Current team: Euskaltel–Euskadi
- Discipline: Road
- Role: Rider
- Rider type: Sprinter

Amateur teams
- 2020: OCC Antibes U19
- 2021: Sprinter Nice Métropole

Professional teams
- 2022–2024: Nice Métropole Côte d'Azur
- 2025–: Euskaltel–Euskadi

Paul Hennequin (born 9 December 2002) is a French professional racing cyclist, who currently rides for UCI ProTeam Euskaltel–Euskadi.

== Major results ==
2021
5th Overall Tour of Kosovo

1st Young rider classification
1st Stage 3

2023
1st Overall Tour d'Algérie

1st Young rider classification

2024
10th Overall Tour du Maroc

1st Points classification
1st Stages 3 & 10

10th La Roue Tourangelle
2025 (1 pro win)
Tour de Taiwan

1st Points classification
1st Stage 5

1st Mountains classification, Four Days of Dunkirk
