= Paul Penhoët =

French cyclist

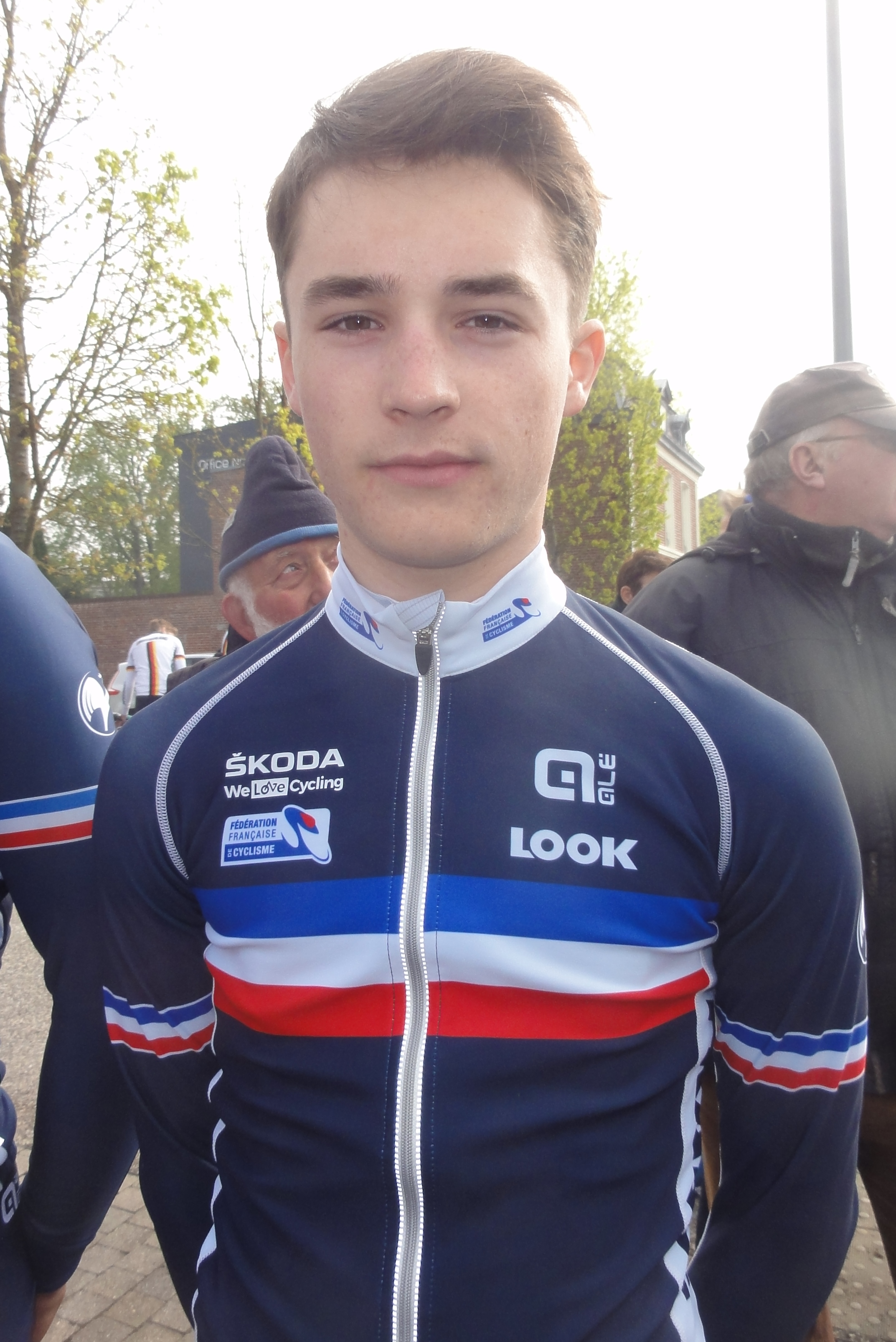
- Penhoët at the 2019 Paris–Roubaix Juniors

Personal information
- Born: 28 December 2001 (age 24) Clamart, France
- Height: 1.73 m (5 ft 8 in)
- Weight: 64 kg (141 lb)

Cycling career
- Sport: Cycling
- Current team: Groupama–FDJ United
- Discipline: Road
- Role: Rider
- Rider type: Sprinter

Amateur team
- 2018–2019: CSM Clamart Junior

Professional teams
- 2020–2022: Équipe Continentale Groupama–FDJ
- 2022–: Groupama–FDJ
Medal record
Men's road cycling
Representing France
Mediterranean Games
Gold medal – first place	2022 Oran	Road race

Paul Penhoët (French: [pol pɛ̃wɛt]; born 28 December 2001) is a French road cyclist, who currently rides for UCI WorldTeam Groupama–FDJ.

== Career ==
In 2022 he rode for UCI WorldTeam Groupama–FDJ as part of a development scheme to allow younger riders to race with the UCI WorldTour team, as the nominated team sprinter at the 2022 Tour of Oman he managed 3 top 10 results. He later joined the team as a full-time rider on August 1.

== Major results ==
2019
6th Bernaudeau Junior
6th La Route des Géants
9th Road race, UEC European Junior Road Championships
2021
1st Overall Tour d'Eure-et-Loir

1st Points classification
1st Young rider classification
1st Stage 3

1st Stage 3 L'Étoile d'Or
8th Road race, UCI Road World Under-23 Championships
2022
1st Road race, Mediterranean Games
2nd Youngster Coast Challenge
3rd Overall Tour de Normandie

1st Points classification
1st Stage 5

5th Dorpenomloop Rucphen
6th Grand Prix de la Ville de Lillers
8th Road race, UCI Road World Under-23 Championships
10th Road race, UEC European Under-23 Road Championships
2023 (2 pro wins)
1st Tour du Finistère
Tour Poitou-Charentes en Nouvelle-Aquitaine

1st Points classification
1st Stage 2

2nd Tour de Vendée
3rd Paris–Chauny
4th Classic Loire Atlantique
4th Paris–Bourges
5th Grand Prix de Fourmies
7th La Roue Tourangelle
8th Schwalbe Classic
9th Clásica de Almería
9th Polynormande
9th Grand Prix d'Isbergues
10th Paris–Tours
2024
2nd Overall Four Days of Dunkirk

1st Young rider classification

2nd Paris–Chauny
4th Circuit de Wallonie
7th Grand Prix d'Isbergues
9th Overall Boucles de la Mayenne
10th Binche–Chimay–Binche
2025
2nd Route Adélie de Vitré
6th Paris–Chauny
6th Binche–Chimay–Binche
2026
4th Hamburg Cyclassics
8th Nokere Koerse
