= Rognac =

Commune in Provence-Alpes-Côte d'Azur, France

Rognac Ronhac (Occitan)
- Commune
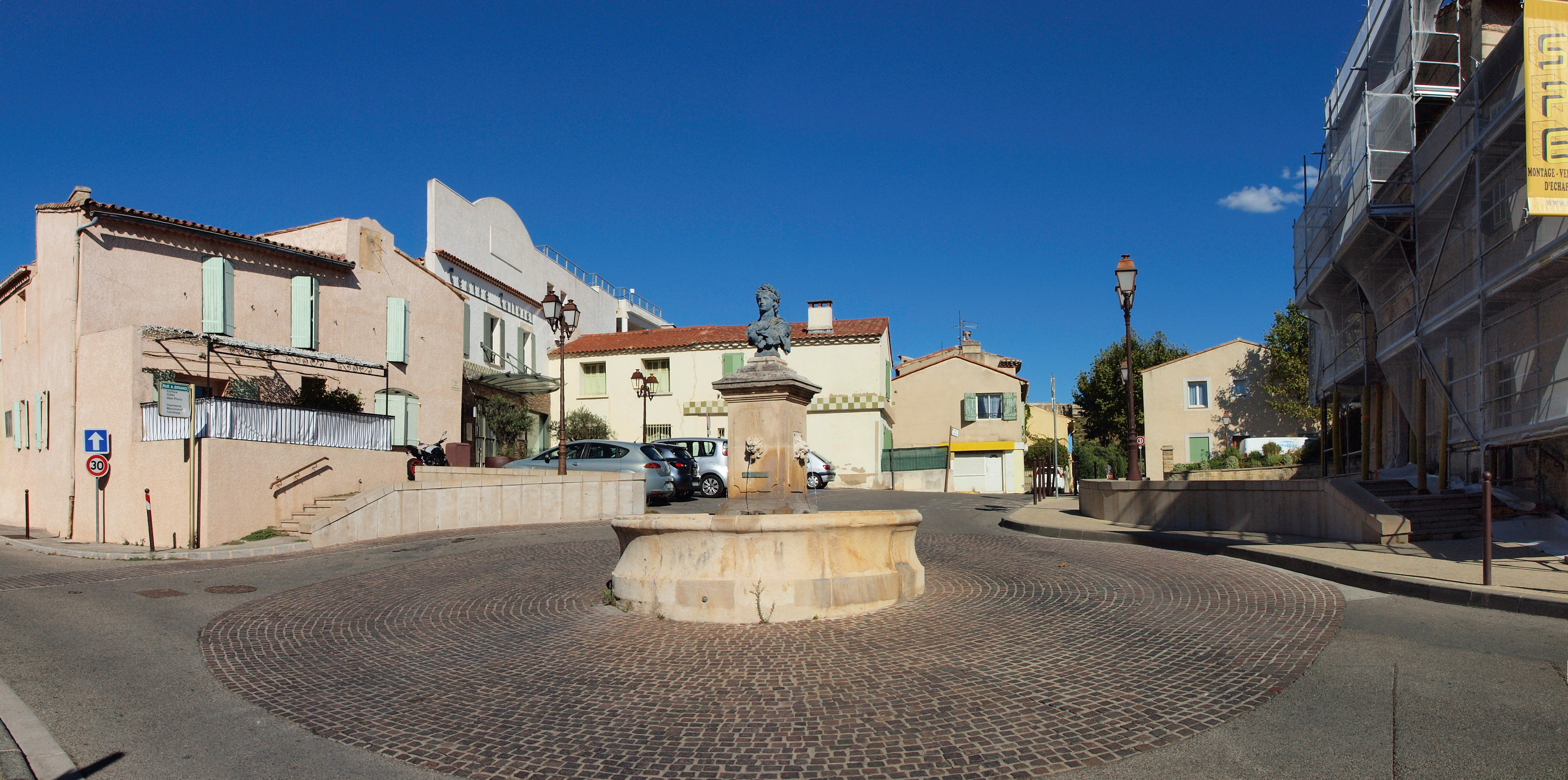
- Marianne fountain in the town centre

- Coat of arms
- Location of Rognac
- Location within France Location within Provence-Alpes-Côte d'Azur
- Coordinates: 43°29′19″N 5°13′59″E
- Country: France
- Region: Provence-Alpes-Côte d'Azur
- Department: Bouches-du-Rhône
- Arrondissement: Istres
- Canton: Berre-l'Étang
- Intercommunality: Aix-Marseille-Provence

Government
  - Mayor (2026–32): Christophe Gonzalez
- Area^{1}: 17.46 km^{2} (6.74 sq mi)
- Elevation: 15 m (49 ft)
- Highest elevation: 271 m (889 ft)
- Lowest elevation: 0 m (0 ft)
- Population (2023): 12,576
  - Density: 720.3/km^{2} (1,866/sq mi)
- Time zone: UTC+01:00 (CET)
  - Summer (DST): UTC+02:00 (CEST)
- INSEE/Postal code: 13081 /13340
- ^{1} French Land Register data, which excludes lakes, ponds, glaciers > 1 km^{2} (0.386 sq mi or 247 acres) and river estuaries.

Rognac (French pronunciation: [ʁɔɲak]; Occitan: Ronhac) is a commune in the Bouches-du-Rhône department in the Provence-Alpes-Côte d'Azur region in Southern France. Located to the east of the Étang de Berre, north of Marseille Provence Airport, it is part of the Aix-Marseille-Provence Metropolis.

== Transport ==
Rognac is served by the Rognac TER PACA railway station, on both the Paris–Marseille railway and Rognac–Aix-en-Provence freight railway.

== Demographics ==
Historical population

Year	Pop.	±% p.a.
1793	511	—
1800	558	+1.26%
1806	555	−0.09%
1821	637	+0.92%
1831	555	−1.37%
1836	625	+2.40%
1841	220	−18.85%
1846	570	+20.97%
1851	748	+5.59%
1856	789	+1.07%
1861	873	+2.04%
1866	873	+0.00%
1872	840	−0.64%
1876	842	+0.06%
1881	683	−4.10%
1886	678	−0.15%
1891	653	−0.75%
1896	722	+2.03%
1901	741	+0.52%

Year	Pop.	±% p.a.
1906	769	+0.74%
1911	763	−0.16%
1921	958	+2.30%
1926	1,165	+3.99%
1931	1,395	+3.67%
1936	1,614	+2.96%
1946	2,008	+2.21%
1954	2,696	+3.75%
1962	3,590	+3.64%
1968	4,270	+2.93%
1975	5,105	+2.58%
1982	9,330	+9.00%
1990	11,099	+2.19%
1999	11,631	+0.52%
2007	12,088	+0.48%
2012	11,737	−0.59%
2017	12,223	+0.81%
2023	12,576	+0.48%

Source: EHESS and INSEE (1968–2023)

== International relations ==
Rognac is twinned with:

- Rockenhausen, Germany
- Veria, Greece

== See also ==
- Étang de Berre
- Communes of the Bouches-du-Rhône department
