= Nice Métropole Côte d'Azur =

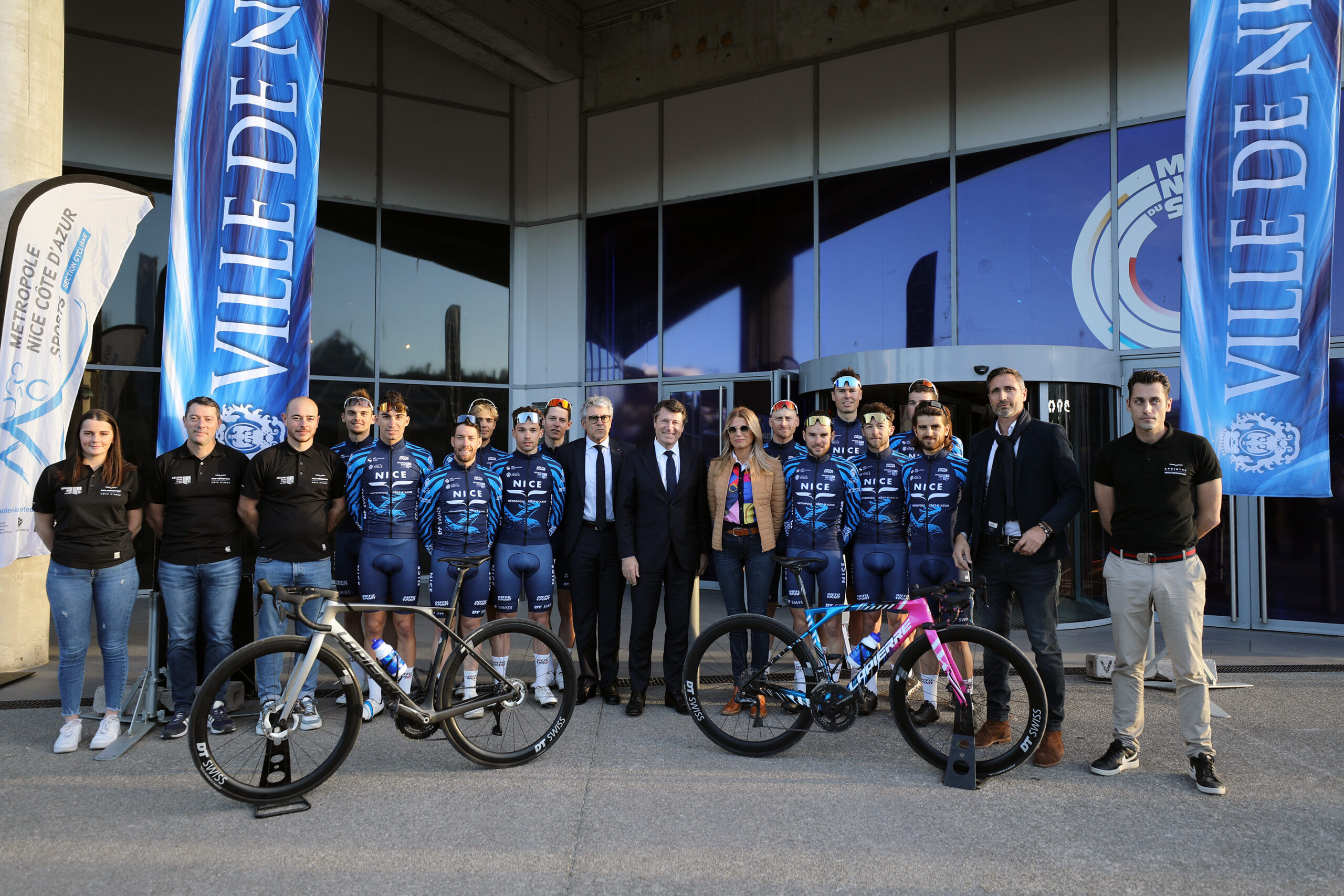
- The team in 2023

Team information
- UCI code: NMC
- Registered: France
- Founded: 2021
- Discipline: Road
- Status: Club (2021); UCI Continental (2022–)

Key personnel
- Team manager: Nicolas Vogondy

Team name history
- 2021 2022–: Sprinter Nice Métropole; Nice Métropole Côte d'Azur

Nice Métropole Côte d'Azur is a French UCI Continental road cycling team established in 2021.

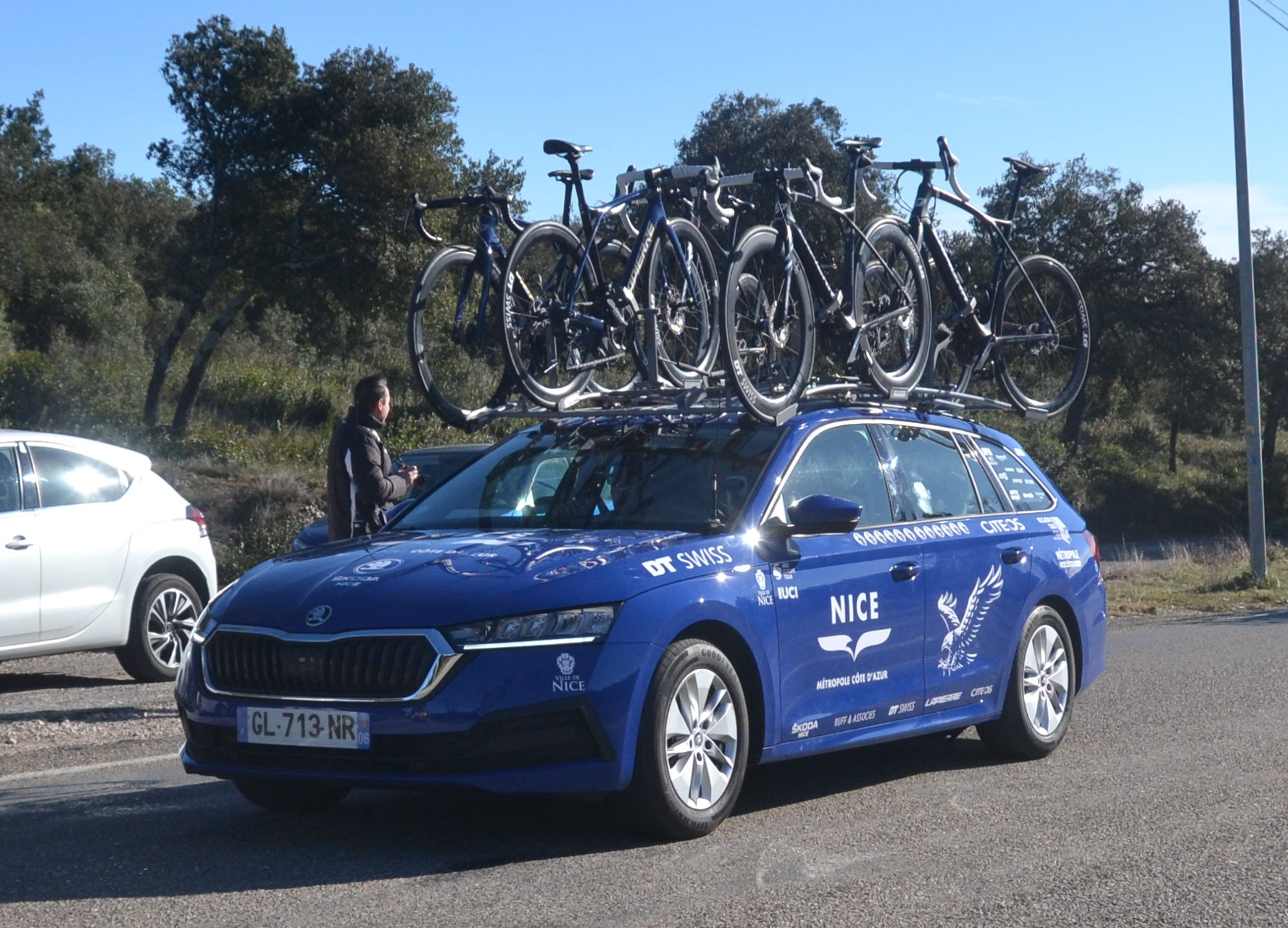
Team car

== Team roster ==
As of 2 February 2024.

Rider	Date of birth
Melvin Crommelinck (FRA)	7 December 2004 (age 21)
Jonathan Couanon (FRA)	8 April 1997 (age 29)
Damien Girard (FRA)	14 December 2001 (age 24)
Paul Hennequin (FRA)	9 December 2002 (age 23)
Noah Knecht (FRA)	14 November 2000 (age 25)

Rider	Date of birth
Alexander Konijn (NED)	15 October 1999 (age 26)
Alexandre Léonien (FRA)	7 November 1999 (age 26)
Jean-Louis Le Ny (FRA)	29 January 1998 (age 28)
Andrea Mifsud (FRA)	28 May 1999 (age 27)
Axel Narbonne Zuccarelli (FRA)	31 May 1998 (age 28)
