= 2026 Tour de Wallonie =

2026 UCI ProSeries
- Poster with previous winner Corbin Strong

Race details
- Dates: 1–5 June 2026
- Stages: 5
- Distance: 892.9 km (554.8 mi)
- Winning time: 21h 15' 51"

Results
| Jersey awarded to the overall winner | Winner | Ben Oliver (NZL) | (Modern Adventure Pro Cycling) |
| | Second | Riley Sheehan (USA) | (NSN Cycling Team) |
| | Third | Arnaud De Lie (BEL) | (Lotto–Intermarché) |
| Jersey awarded to the points classification winner | Points | Ben Oliver (NZL) | (Modern Adventure Pro Cycling) |
| Jersey awarded to the mountains classification winner | Mountains | George Wood (GBR) | (MG.K Vis Costruzioni e Ambiente) |
| | Young rider | Laurence Pithie (NZL) | (Red Bull–Bora–Hansgrohe) |
| Jersey awarded to the sprints classification winner | Sprints | Riley Sheehan (USA) | (NSN Cycling Team) |
| | Team | (Australia) Team Jayco–AlUla | |

The 2026 Tour de Wallonie (known as the Ethias–Tour de Wallonie for sponsorship reasons) was a five-stage men's professional road cycling race mainly held in the Belgian region of Wallonia. It was a 2.Pro race as part of the 2026 UCI ProSeries calendar. It was the 53rd edition of the Tour de Wallonie.

== Teams ==
Seven UCI WorldTeams, two UCI ProTeams, and eight UCI Continental teams made up the seventeen teams that participated in the race.

UCI WorldTeams

- Alpecin–Premier Tech
- Lotto–Intermarché
- Movistar Team
- Netcompany INEOS
- NSN Cycling Team
- Red Bull–Bora–Hansgrohe
- Team Jayco–AlUla

UCI ProTeams

- Modern Adventure Pro Cycling
- Team Flanders–Baloise

UCI Continental Teams

- Bike Aid
- Baloise Verzekeringen–Het Poetsbureau Lions
- Color Code–Alu Center
- MG.K Vis Costruzioni e Ambiente
- Pauwels Sauzen–Altez Industriebouw Cycling Team
- Tarteletto–Isorex
- Team Storck–MRW BAU
- Van Rysel–Roubaix

== Route ==
Stage characteristics and winners
| Stage | Date | Route | Distance | Type | Winner |
|---|---|---|---|---|---|
| 1 | 1 June | Manage to Lobbes | 180.7 km (112.3 mi) | Hilly stage | Jordi Meeus (BEL) |
| 2 | 2 June | Jodoigne to Libramont-Chevigny | 192.1 km (119.4 mi) | Hilly stage | Ben Oliver (NZL) |
| 3 | 3 June | Habay to Vaux-sur-Sûre | 176.9 km (109.9 mi) | Hilly stage | Laurence Pithie (NZL) |
| 4 | 4 June | Dison to Eupen | 166.7 km (103.6 mi) | Hilly stage | Arnaud De Lie (BEL) |
| 5 | 5 June | Bassenge to Aubel | 176.5 km (109.7 mi) | Hilly stage | Ben Oliver (NZL) |
| Total | | | 892.9 km (554.8 mi) | | |

== Stages ==
=== Stage 1 ===
1 June 2026 — Manage to Lobbes, 180.7 km (112.3 mi)

Stage 1 Result
| Rank | Rider | Team | Time |
|---|---|---|---|
| 1 | Jordi Meeus (BEL) | Red Bull–Bora–Hansgrohe | 4h 13' 32" |
| 2 | Anders Foldager (DEN) | Team Jayco–AlUla | + 0" |
| 3 | Kim Heiduk (GER) | Netcompany INEOS | + 0" |
| 4 | Ben Oliver (NZL) | Modern Adventure Pro Cycling | + 0" |
| 5 | Milan Menten (BEL) | Lotto–Intermarché | + 0" |
| 6 | Liam Slock (BEL) | Lotto–Intermarché | + 0" |
| 7 | Joppe Heremans (BEL) | Van Rysel–Roubaix | + 0" |
| 8 | Niels Vandeputte (BEL) | Alpecin–Premier Tech | + 0" |
| 9 | Natnael Tesfatsion (ERI) | Movistar Team | + 0" |
| 10 | Carlos Canal (ESP) | Movistar Team | + 0" |

General classification after Stage 1
| Rank | Rider | Team | Time |
|---|---|---|---|
| 1 | Jordi Meeus (BEL) | Red Bull–Bora–Hansgrohe | 4h 13' 22" |
| 2 | Anders Foldager (DEN) | Team Jayco–AlUla | + 3" |
| 3 | Kim Heiduk (GER) | Netcompany INEOS | + 3" |
| 4 | Krists Neilands (LAT) | NSN Cycling Team | + 8" |
| 5 | Ben Oliver (NZL) | Modern Adventure Pro Cycling | + 10" |
| 6 | Milan Menten (BEL) | Lotto–Intermarché | + 10" |
| 7 | Liam Slock (BEL) | Lotto–Intermarché | + 10" |
| 8 | Joppe Heremans (BEL) | Van Rysel–Roubaix | + 10" |
| 9 | Niels Vandeputte (BEL) | Alpecin–Premier Tech | + 10" |
| 10 | Natnael Tesfatsion (ERI) | Movistar Team | + 10" |

=== Stage 2 ===
2 June 2026 — Jodoigne to Libramont-Chevigny, 192.1 km (119.4 mi)

Stage 2 Result
| Rank | Rider | Team | Time |
|---|---|---|---|
| 1 | Ben Oliver (NZL) | Modern Adventure Pro Cycling | 4h 39' 28" |
| 2 | Yorben Lauryssen (BEL) | Tarteletto–Isorex | + 0" |
| 3 | Riley Sheehan (USA) | NSN Cycling Team | + 0" |
| 4 | Sente Sentjens (BEL) | Alpecin–Premier Tech | + 0" |
| 5 | Jordi Meeus (BEL) | Red Bull–Bora–Hansgrohe | + 0" |
| 6 | Arnaud De Lie (BEL) | Lotto–Intermarché | + 0" |
| 7 | Tom Crabbe (BEL) | Team Flanders–Baloise | + 0" |
| 8 | Daan Depuydt (BEL) | Baloise Verzekeringen–Het Poetsbureau Lions | + 0" |
| 9 | Kim Heiduk (GER) | Netcompany INEOS | + 0" |
| 10 | Kilian Théot (FRA) | Van Rysel–Roubaix | + 0" |

General classification after Stage 2
| Rank | Rider | Team | Time |
|---|---|---|---|
| 1 | Ben Oliver (NZL) | Modern Adventure Pro Cycling | 8h 52' 50" |
| 2 | Jordi Meeus (BEL) | Red Bull–Bora–Hansgrohe | + 0" |
| 3 | Asbjørn Hellemose (DEN) | Team Jayco–AlUla | + 2" |
| 4 | Kim Heiduk (GER) | Netcompany INEOS | + 3" |
| 5 | Anders Foldager (DEN) | Team Jayco–AlUla | + 3" |
| 6 | Yorben Lauryssen (BEL) | Tarteletto–Isorex | + 4" |
| 7 | Riley Sheehan (USA) | NSN Cycling Team | + 6" |
| 8 | Krists Neilands (LAT) | NSN Cycling Team | + 8" |
| 9 | Tom Crabbe (BEL) | Team Flanders–Baloise | + 10" |
| 10 | Liam Slock (BEL) | Lotto–Intermarché | + 10" |

=== Stage 3 ===
3 June 2026 — Habay to Vaux-sur-Sûre, 176.9 km (109.9 mi)

Stage 3 Result
| Rank | Rider | Team | Time |
|---|---|---|---|
| 1 | Laurence Pithie (NZL) | Red Bull–Bora–Hansgrohe | 4h 06' 30" |
| 2 | Kim Heiduk (GER) | Netcompany INEOS | + 0" |
| 3 | Krists Neilands (LAT) | NSN Cycling Team | + 0" |
| 4 | Axel Laurance (FRA) | Netcompany INEOS | + 0" |
| 5 | Danny van Poppel (NED) | Red Bull–Bora–Hansgrohe | + 0" |
| 6 | Halvor Dolven (NOR) | Lotto–Intermarché | + 0" |
| 7 | Florian Sénéchal (FRA) | Alpecin–Premier Tech | + 0" |
| 8 | Adrien Boichis (FRA) | Red Bull–Bora–Hansgrohe | + 0" |
| 9 | Noah Ramsay (CAN) | Alpecin–Premier Tech | + 0" |
| 10 | Jordi Meeus (BEL) | Red Bull–Bora–Hansgrohe | + 0" |

General classification after Stage 3
| Rank | Rider | Team | Time |
|---|---|---|---|
| 1 | Kim Heiduk (GER) | Netcompany INEOS | 12h 59' 17" |
| 2 | Jordi Meeus (BEL) | Red Bull–Bora–Hansgrohe | + 3" |
| 3 | Ben Oliver (NZL) | Modern Adventure Pro Cycling | + 3" |
| 4 | Laurence Pithie (NZL) | Red Bull–Bora–Hansgrohe | + 3" |
| 5 | Asbjørn Hellemose (DEN) | Team Jayco–AlUla | + 5" |
| 6 | Anders Foldager (DEN) | Team Jayco–AlUla | + 6" |
| 7 | Krists Neilands (LAT) | NSN Cycling Team | + 7" |
| 8 | Senne Thonnon (BEL) | Team Flanders–Baloise | + 7" |
| 9 | Riley Sheehan (USA) | NSN Cycling Team | + 9" |
| 10 | Tom Crabbe (BEL) | Team Flanders–Baloise | + 13" |

=== Stage 4 ===
4 June 2026 — Dison to Eupen, 166.7 km (103.6 mi)

Stage 4 Result
| Rank | Rider | Team | Time |
|---|---|---|---|
| 1 | Arnaud De Lie (BEL) | Lotto–Intermarché | 4h 07' 57" |
| 2 | Riley Sheehan (USA) | NSN Cycling Team | + 0" |
| 3 | Ben Oliver (NZL) | Modern Adventure Pro Cycling | + 4" |
| 4 | Carlos Canal (ESP) | Movistar Team | + 7" |
| 5 | Adrien Boichis (FRA) | Red Bull–Bora–Hansgrohe | + 7" |
| 6 | Laurence Pithie (NZL) | Red Bull–Bora–Hansgrohe | + 7" |
| 7 | Anders Foldager (DEN) | Team Jayco–AlUla | + 7" |
| 8 | Daan Depuyst (BEL) | Baloise Verzekeringen–Het Poetsbureau Lions | + 11" |
| 9 | Lennert Teugels (BEL) | Tarteletto–Isorex | + 15" |
| 10 | Kim Heiduk (GER) | Netcompany INEOS | + 15" |

General classification after Stage 4
| Rank | Rider | Team | Time |
|---|---|---|---|
| 1 | Riley Sheehan (USA) | NSN Cycling Team | 17h 07' 14" |
| 2 | Ben Oliver (NZL) | Modern Adventure Pro Cycling | + 3" |
| 3 | Arnaud De Lie (BEL) | Lotto–Intermarché | + 3" |
| 4 | Laurence Pithie (NZL) | Red Bull–Bora–Hansgrohe | + 10" |
| 5 | Anders Foldager (DEN) | Team Jayco–AlUla | + 13" |
| 6 | Kim Heiduk (GER) | Netcompany INEOS | + 15" |
| 7 | Carlos Canal (ESP) | Movistar Team | + 20" |
| 8 | Adrien Boichis (FRA) | Red Bull–Bora–Hansgrohe | + 20" |
| 9 | Lennert Teugels (BEL) | Tarteletto–Isorex | + 28" |
| 10 | Henri Vandenabeele (BEL) | Team Flanders–Baloise | + 28" |

=== Stage 5 ===
5 June 2026 — Bassenge to Aubel, 176.5 km (109.7 mi)

Stage 5 Result
| Rank | Rider | Team | Time |
|---|---|---|---|
| 1 | Ben Oliver (NZL) | Modern Adventure Pro Cycling | 4h 08' 44" |
| 2 | Kilian Théot (FRA) | Van Rysel–Roubaix | + 0" |
| 3 | Arnaud De Lie (BEL) | Lotto–Intermarché | + 0" |
| 4 | Anders Foldager (DEN) | Team Jayco–AlUla | + 0" |
| 5 | Daan Depuydt (BEL) | Baloise Verzekeringen–Het Poetsbureau Lions | + 0" |
| 6 | Yorben Lauryssen (BEL) | Tarteletto–Isorex | + 0" |
| 7 | Michiel Lambrecht (BEL) | Team Flanders–Baloise | + 0" |
| 8 | Pelayo Sánchez (ESP) | Movistar Team | + 0" |
| 9 | Francesco Parravano (ITA) | MG.K Vis Costruzioni e Ambiente | + 0" |
| 10 | Olivier Godfroid (BEL) | Baloise Verzekeringen–Het Poetsbureau Lions | + 0" |

General classification after Stage 5
| Rank | Rider | Team | Time |
|---|---|---|---|
| 1 | Ben Oliver (NZL) | Modern Adventure Pro Cycling | 21h 15' 51" |
| 2 | Riley Sheehan (USA) | NSN Cycling Team | + 2" |
| 3 | Arnaud De Lie (BEL) | Lotto–Intermarché | + 5" |
| 4 | Laurence Pithie (NZL) | Red Bull–Bora–Hansgrohe | + 12" |
| 5 | Anders Foldager (DEN) | Team Jayco–AlUla | + 20" |
| 6 | Kim Heiduk (GER) | Netcompany INEOS | + 22" |
| 7 | Adrien Boichis (FRA) | Red Bull–Bora–Hansgrohe | + 26" |
| 8 | Carlos Canal (ESP) | Movistar Team | + 27" |
| 9 | Lennert Teugels (BEL) | Tarteletto–Isorex | + 35" |
| 10 | Henri Vandenabeele (BEL) | Team Flanders–Baloise | + 35" |

== Classification leadership table ==
Classification leadership by stage
| Stage | Winner | General classification | Points classification | Mountains classification | Sprints classification | Young rider classification | Team classification |
|---|---|---|---|---|---|---|---|
| 1 | Jordi Meeus | Jordi Meeus | Jordi Meeus | Samuel Flórez | Dries De Bondt | Joppe Heremans | Team Jayco–AlUla |
| 2 | Ben Oliver | Ben Oliver | Ben Oliver | Samuel Flórez | Asbjørn Hellemose | Tom Crabbe | Team Jayco–AlUla |
| 3 | Laurence Pithie | Kim Heiduk | Kim Heiduk | Senne Thonnon | Filippo Conca | Laurence Pithie | Team Flanders–Baloise |
| 4 | Arnaud De Lie | Ben Oliver | Ben Oliver | Samuel Flórez | Filippo Conca | Laurence Pithie | Netcompany INEOS |
| 5 | Ben Oliver | Ben Oliver | Ben Oliver | George Wood | Riley Sheehan | Laurence Pithie | Team Jayco–AlUla |
| Final | | Ben Oliver | Ben Oliver | George Wood | Riley Sheehan | Laurence Pithie | Team Jayco–AlUla |

== Classification standings ==
Legend
| Denotes the winner of the general classification | Denotes the winner of the sprints classification |
| Denotes the winner of the mountains classification | Denotes the winner of the points classification |

=== General classification ===
Final general classification (1–10)
| Rank | Rider | Team | Time |
|---|---|---|---|
| 1 | Ben Oliver (NZL) | Modern Adventure Pro Cycling | 21h 15' 51" |
| 2 | Riley Sheehan (USA) | NSN Cycling Team | + 2" |
| 3 | Arnaud De Lie (BEL) | Lotto–Intermarché | + 5" |
| 4 | Laurence Pithie (NZL) | Red Bull–Bora–Hansgrohe | + 12" |
| 5 | Anders Foldager (DEN) | Team Jayco–AlUla | + 20" |
| 6 | Kim Heiduk (GER) | Netcompany INEOS | + 22" |
| 7 | Adrien Boichis (FRA) | Red Bull–Bora–Hansgrohe | + 26" |
| 8 | Carlos Canal (ESP) | Movistar Team | + 27" |
| 9 | Lennert Teugels (BEL) | Tarteletto–Isorex | + 35" |
| 10 | Henri Vandenabeele (BEL) | Team Flanders–Baloise | + 35" |

=== Points classification ===
Final points classification (1–10)
| Rank | Rider | Team | Points |
|---|---|---|---|
| 1 | Ben Oliver (NZL) | Modern Adventure Pro Cycling | 75 |
| 2 | Arnaud De Lie (BEL) | Lotto–Intermarché | 46 |
| 3 | Kim Heiduk (GER) | Netcompany INEOS | 38 |
| 4 | Riley Sheehan (USA) | NSN Cycling Team | 35 |
| 5 | Jordi Meeus (BEL) | Red Bull–Bora–Hansgrohe | 34 |
| 6 | Anders Foldager (DEN) | Team Jayco–AlUla | 34 |
| 7 | Laurence Pithie (NZL) | Red Bull–Bora–Hansgrohe | 31 |
| 8 | Yorben Lauryssen (BEL) | Tarteletto–Isorex | 26 |
| 9 | Kilian Théot (FRA) | Van Rysel–Roubaix | 21 |
| 10 | Krists Neilands (LAT) | NSN Cycling Team | 15 |

=== Mountains classification ===
Final mountains classification (1–10)
| Rank | Rider | Team | Points |
|---|---|---|---|
| 1 | George Wood (GBR) | MG.K Vis Costruzioni e Ambiente | 74 |
| 2 | Jonah Killy (USA) | Tarteletto–Isorex | 60 |
| 3 | Samuel Flórez (COL) | Modern Adventure Pro Cycling | 30 |
| 4 | Senne Thonnon (BEL) | Team Flanders–Baloise | 22 |
| 5 | Gianni Marchand (BEL) | Tarteletto–Isorex | 22 |
| 6 | Pim Ronhaar (NED) | Baloise Verzekeringen–Het Poetsbureau Lions | 16 |
| 7 | Alvaro Sagrado (ESP) | Team Storck–MRW BAU | 10 |
| 8 | Siebe Deweirdt (BEL) | Team Flanders–Baloise | 8 |
| 9 | Kenny Molly (BEL) | Van Rysel–Roubaix | 8 |
| 10 | Dries De Bondt (BEL) | Team Jayco–AlUla | 8 |

=== Sprints classification ===
Final sprints classification (1–10)
| Rank | Rider | Team | Points |
|---|---|---|---|
| 1 | Riley Sheehan (USA) | NSN Cycling Team | 13 |
| 2 | Dries De Bondt (BEL) | Team Jayco–AlUla | 13 |
| 3 | Samuel Flórez (COL) | Modern Adventure Pro Cycling | 10 |
| 4 | Senne Thonnon (BEL) | Team Flanders–Baloise | 9 |
| 5 | Laurence Pithie (NZL) | Red Bull–Bora–Hansgrohe | 8 |
| 6 | Kévin Avoine (FRA) | Van Rysel–Roubaix | 6 |
| 7 | Kim Heiduk (GER) | Netcompany INEOS | 5 |
| 8 | Siebe Deweirdt (BEL) | Team Flanders–Baloise | 5 |
| 9 | Pim Ronhaar (NED) | Baloise Verzekeringen–Het Poetsbureau Lions | 4 |
| 10 | Krists Neilands (LAT) | NSN Cycling Team | 3 |

=== Young rider classification ===
Final young rider classification (1–10)
| Rank | Rider | Team | Time |
|---|---|---|---|
| 1 | Laurence Pithie (NZL) | Red Bull–Bora–Hansgrohe | 21h 16' 03" |
| 2 | Adrien Boichis (FRA) | Red Bull–Bora–Hansgrohe | + 14" |
| 3 | Senne Thonnon (BEL) | Team Flanders–Baloise | + 41" |
| 4 | Kay De Bruyckere (BEL) | Pauwels Sauzen–Altez Industriebouw Cycling Team | + 52" |
| 5 | Lucas Jacques (BEL) | Color Code–Alu Center | + 1' 37" |
| 6 | Kieran Haug (USA) | Modern Adventure Pro Cycling | + 3' 31" |
| 7 | Noah Ramsay (CAN) | Alpecin–Premier Tech | + 3' 49" |
| 8 | Daan Depuydt (BEL) | Baloise Verzekeringen–Het Poetsbureau Lions | + 4' 11" |
| 9 | Michiel Lambrecht (BEL) | Team Flanders–Baloise | + 5' 00" |
| 10 | Joppe Heremans (BEL) | Van Rysel–Roubaix | + 5' 41" |

=== Team classification ===
Final team classification (1–10)
| Rank | Team | Time |
|---|---|---|
| 1 | (Australia) Team Jayco–AlUla | 63h 49' 41" |
| 2 | (Belgium) Team Flanders–Baloise | + 23" |
| 3 | (Spain) Movistar Team | + 1' 23" |
| 4 | (United Kingdom) Netcompany INEOS | + 2' 39" |
| 5 | (United States) Modern Adventure Pro Cycling | + 2' 44" |
| 6 | (Belgium) Lotto–Intermarché | + 2' 47" |
| 7 | (Switzerland) NSN Cycling Team | + 4' 59" |
| 8 | (France) Van Rysel–Roubaix | + 6' 39" |
| 9 | (Germany) Red Bull–Bora–Hansgrohe | + 6' 40" |
| 10 | (Belgium) Alpecin–Premier Tech | + 8' 27" |
