= 2024 Tour de Wallonie =

2024 UCI ProSeries
- Circuit of the 2024 Tour de Wallonie

Race details
- Dates: 22–26 July 2024
- Stages: 5
- Distance: 940.74 km (584.55 mi)
- Winning time: 22h 02' 46"

Results
Jersey awarded to the overall winner	Winner	Matteo Trentin (ITA)	(Tudor Pro Cycling Team)
	Second	Corbin Strong (NZL)	(Israel–Premier Tech)
	Third	Alex Kirsch (LUX)	(Lidl–Trek)
Jersey awarded to the points classification winner	Points	Matteo Trentin (ITA)	(Tudor Pro Cycling Team)
Jersey awarded to the mountains classification winner	Mountains	Jimmy Janssens (BEL)	(Alpecin–Deceuninck)
Jersey awarded to the young rider classification winner	Young rider	Frederik Wandahl (DEN)	(Red Bull–Bora–Hansgrohe)
Jersey awarded to the sprints classification winner	Sprints	Cole Kessler (USA)	(Lidl–Trek)
	Team	Israel–Premier Tech	

The 2024 Tour de Wallonie (known as the Ethias–Tour de Wallonie for sponsorship reasons) was a five-stage men's professional road cycling race mainly held in the Belgian region of Wallonia. It was a 2.Pro race as part of the 2024 UCI ProSeries calendar. It was the 51st edition of the Tour de Wallonie.

== Teams ==
Nine UCI WorldTeams, seven UCI ProTeams, and two UCI Continental teams make up the eighteen teams that will participate in the race.

UCI WorldTeams

- Alpecin–Deceuninck
- Arkéa–B&B Hotels
- Decathlon–AG2R La Mondiale
- Groupama–FDJ
- Intermarché–Wanty
- Lidl–Trek
- Movistar Team
- Red Bull–Bora–Hansgrohe
- Visma–Lease a Bike

UCI ProTeams

- Bingoal WB
- Israel–Premier Tech
- Lotto–Dstny
- Team Flanders–Baloise
- Team TotalEnergies
- Tudor Pro Cycling Team
- Uno-X Mobility

UCI Continental Teams

- Baloise–Trek Lions
- Pauwels Sauzen–Bingoal

== Route ==
Stage characteristics and winners
Stage	Date	Route	Distance	Type	Winner
1	22 July	Tournai to Fleurus	179.2 km (111.3 mi)	Flat stage	Jordi Meeus (BEL)
2	23 July	Saint-Ghislain to Ouffet	188.25 km (116.97 mi)	Hilly stage	Corbin Strong (NZL)
3	24 July	Arlon to La Roche-en-Ardenne	192.63 km (119.69 mi)	Hilly stage	Markus Hoelgaard (NOR)
4	25 July	Verviers to Herve	188.51 km (117.13 mi)	Hilly stage	Matteo Trentin (ITA)
5	26 July	Mouscron to Thuin	192.15 km (119.40 mi)	Hilly stage	Samuel Watson (GBR)
Total			940.74 km (584.55 mi)		

== Stages ==
=== Stage 1 ===
22 July 2024 — Tournai to Fleurus, 179.2 km (111.3 mi)

Stage 1 Result
Rank	Rider	Team	Time
1	Jordi Meeus (BEL)	Red Bull–Bora–Hansgrohe	4h 03' 11"
2	Madis Mihkels (EST)	Intermarché–Wanty	+ 0"
3	Paul Penhoët (FRA)	Groupama–FDJ	+ 0"
4	Mick van Dijke (NED)	Visma–Lease a Bike	+ 0"
5	Emilien Jeannière (FRA)	Team TotalEnergies	+ 0"
6	Pierre Gautherat (FRA)	Decathlon–AG2R La Mondiale	+ 0"
7	Jesse Kramer (NED)	Visma–Lease a Bike	+ 0"
8	Lilian Calmejane (FRA)	Intermarché–Wanty	+ 0"
9	Luca Van Boven (BEL)	Bingoal WB	+ 0"
10	Florian Vermeersch (BEL)	Lotto–Dstny	+ 0"

General classification after Stage 1
Rank	Rider	Team	Time
1	Jordi Meeus (BEL)	Red Bull–Bora–Hansgrohe	4h 03' 01"
2	Madis Mihkels (EST)	Intermarché–Wanty	+ 4"
3	Paul Penhoët (FRA)	Groupama–FDJ	+ 6"
4	Corbin Strong (NZL)	Israel–Premier Tech	+ 7"
5	Benoît Cosnefroy (FRA)	Decathlon–AG2R La Mondiale	+ 7"
6	Alex Kirsch (LUX)	Lidl–Trek	+ 8"
7	Matteo Trentin (ITA)	Tudor Pro Cycling Team	+ 8"
8	Stan Dewulf (BEL)	Decathlon–AG2R La Mondiale	+ 9"
9	Andreas Kron (DEN)	Lotto–Dstny	+ 9"
10	Mick van Dijke (NED)	Visma–Lease a Bike	+ 10"

=== Stage 2 ===
23 July 2024 — Saint-Ghislain to Ouffet, 188.25 km (116.97 mi)

Stage 2 Result
Rank	Rider	Team	Time
1	Corbin Strong (NZL)	Israel–Premier Tech	4h 04' 23"
2	Emilien Jeannière (FRA)	Team TotalEnergies	+ 0"
3	Paul Penhoët (FRA)	Groupama–FDJ	+ 0"
4	Alex Kirsch (LUX)	Lidl–Trek	+ 0"
5	Natnael Tesfatsion (ERI)	Lidl–Trek	+ 0"
6	Alec Segaert (BEL)	Lotto–Dstny	+ 0"
7	Carlos Canal (ESP)	Movistar Team	+ 0"
8	Matteo Trentin (ITA)	Tudor Pro Cycling Team	+ 0"
9	Clément Venturini (FRA)	Arkéa–B&B Hotels	+ 0"
10	Simon Clarke (AUS)	Israel–Premier Tech	+ 0"

General classification after Stage 2
Rank	Rider	Team	Time
1	Corbin Strong (NZL)	Israel–Premier Tech	8h 07' 21"
2	Jordi Meeus (BEL)	Red Bull–Bora–Hansgrohe	+ 3"
3	Paul Penhoët (FRA)	Groupama–FDJ	+ 5"
4	Emilien Jeannière (FRA)	Team TotalEnergies	+ 7"
5	Benoît Cosnefroy (FRA)	Decathlon–AG2R La Mondiale	+ 10"
6	Alex Kirsch (LUX)	Lidl–Trek	+ 11"
7	Matteo Trentin (ITA)	Tudor Pro Cycling Team	+ 11"
8	Pascal Eenkhoorn (NED)	Lotto–Dstny	+ 11"
9	Stan Dewulf (BEL)	Decathlon–AG2R La Mondiale	+ 12"
10	Mick van Dijke (NED)	Visma–Lease a Bike	+ 13"

=== Stage 3 ===
24 July 2024 — Arlon to La Roche-en-Ardenne, 192.63 km (119.69 mi)

Stage 3 Result
Rank	Rider	Team	Time
1	Markus Hoelgaard (NOR)	Uno-X Mobility	4h 46' 53"
2	Jimmy Janssens (BEL)	Alpecin–Deceuninck	+ 2"
3	Matteo Trentin (ITA)	Tudor Pro Cycling Team	+ 43"
4	Frederik Wandahl (DEN)	Red Bull–Bora–Hansgrohe	+ 43"
5	Carlos Canal (ESP)	Movistar Team	+ 43"
6	Corbin Strong (NZL)	Israel–Premier Tech	+ 43"
7	Lorenzo Rota (ITA)	Intermarché–Wanty	+ 43"
8	Per Strand Hagenes (NOR)	Visma–Lease a Bike	+ 43"
9	Alex Kirsch (LUX)	Lidl–Trek	+ 43"
10	Stan Dewulf (BEL)	Decathlon–AG2R La Mondiale	+ 43"

General classification after Stage 3
Rank	Rider	Team	Time
1	Corbin Strong (NZL)	Israel–Premier Tech	12h 54' 57"
2	Matteo Trentin (ITA)	Tudor Pro Cycling Team	+ 7"
3	Alex Kirsch (LUX)	Lidl–Trek	+ 11"
4	Stan Dewulf (BEL)	Decathlon–AG2R La Mondiale	+ 12"
5	Simon Clarke (AUS)	Israel–Premier Tech	+ 12"
6	Carlos Canal (ESP)	Movistar Team	+ 13"
7	Dylan Teuns (BEL)	Israel–Premier Tech	+ 13"
8	Lorenzo Rota (ITA)	Intermarché–Wanty	+ 13"
9	Rudy Molard (FRA)	Groupama–FDJ	+ 13"
10	Natnael Tesfatsion (ERI)	Lidl–Trek	+ 13"

=== Stage 4 ===
25 July 2024 — Verviers to Herve, 188.51 km (117.13 mi)

Stage 4 Result
Rank	Rider	Team	Time
1	Matteo Trentin (ITA)	Tudor Pro Cycling Team	4h 20' 03"
2	Timo Kielich (BEL)	Alpecin–Deceuninck	+ 0"
3	Emilien Jeannière (FRA)	Team TotalEnergies	+ 0"
4	Madis Mihkels (EST)	Intermarché–Wanty	+ 0"
5	Mick van Dijke (NED)	Visma–Lease a Bike	+ 0"
6	Louis Barré (FRA)	Arkéa–B&B Hotels	+ 0"
7	Iván García Cortina (ESP)	Movistar Team	+ 0"
8	Lewis Askey (GBR)	Groupama–FDJ	+ 0"
9	Tibor Del Grosso (NED)	Alpecin–Deceuninck	+ 0"
10	Dion Smith (NZL)	Intermarché–Wanty	+ 0"

General classification after Stage 4
Rank	Rider	Team	Time
1	Matteo Trentin (ITA)	Tudor Pro Cycling Team	17h 14' 54"
2	Corbin Strong (NZL)	Israel–Premier Tech	+ 6"
3	Alex Kirsch (LUX)	Lidl–Trek	+ 15"
4	Stan Dewulf (BEL)	Decathlon–AG2R La Mondiale	+ 18"
5	Frederik Wandahl (DEN)	Red Bull–Bora–Hansgrohe	+ 18"
6	Simon Clarke (AUS)	Israel–Premier Tech	+ 18"
7	Carlos Canal (ESP)	Movistar Team	+ 19"
8	Dylan Teuns (BEL)	Israel–Premier Tech	+ 19"
9	Rudy Molard (FRA)	Groupama–FDJ	+ 19"
10	Natnael Tesfatsion (ERI)	Lidl–Trek	+ 19"

=== Stage 5 ===
26 July 2024 — Mouscron to Thuin, 192.15 km (119.40 mi)

Stage 5 Result
Rank	Rider	Team	Time
1	Samuel Watson (GBR)	Groupama–FDJ	4h 47' 48"
2	Corbin Strong (NZL)	Israel–Premier Tech	+ 4"
3	Timo Kielich (BEL)	Alpecin–Deceuninck	+ 4"
4	Natnael Tesfatsion (ERI)	Lidl–Trek	+ 4"
5	Per Strand Hagenes (NOR)	Visma–Lease a Bike	+ 4"
6	Stan Dewulf (BEL)	Decathlon–AG2R La Mondiale	+ 4"
7	Iván García Cortina (ESP)	Movistar Team	+ 4"
8	Matteo Trentin (ITA)	Tudor Pro Cycling Team	+ 4"
9	Rudy Molard (FRA)	Groupama–FDJ	+ 4"
10	Carlos Canal (ESP)	Movistar Team	+ 4"

General classification after Stage 5
Rank	Rider	Team	Time
1	Matteo Trentin (ITA)	Tudor Pro Cycling Team	22h 02' 46"
2	Corbin Strong (NZL)	Israel–Premier Tech	+ 0"
3	Alex Kirsch (LUX)	Lidl–Trek	+ 15"
4	Stan Dewulf (BEL)	Decathlon–AG2R La Mondiale	+ 18"
5	Frederik Wandahl (DEN)	Red Bull–Bora–Hansgrohe	+ 18"
6	Simon Clarke (AUS)	Israel–Premier Tech	+ 18"
7	Carlos Canal (ESP)	Movistar Team	+ 19"
8	Natnael Tesfatsion (ERI)	Lidl–Trek	+ 19"
9	Rudy Molard (FRA)	Groupama–FDJ	+ 19"
10	Dylan Teuns (BEL)	Israel–Premier Tech	+ 19"

== Classification leadership table ==
Classification leadership by stage
Stage	Winner	General classification	Points classification	Mountains classification	Sprints classification	Young rider classification	Team classification	Combativity award
1	Jordi Meeus	Jordi Meeus	Jordi Meeus	Andreas Kron	Corbin Strong	Madis Mihkels	Intermarché–Wanty	Michiel Lambrecht
2	Corbin Strong	Corbin Strong	Paul Penhoët	Johan Jacobs	Baptiste Veistroffer	Paul Penhoët	Groupama–FDJ	Cole Kessler
3	Markus Hoelgaard	Corbin Strong	Corbin Strong	Jimmy Janssens	Markus Hoelgaard	Carlos Canal	Israel–Premier Tech	Gilles De Wilde
4	Matteo Trentin	Matteo Trentin	Matteo Trentin	Jimmy Janssens	Cole Kessler	Frederik Wandahl	Israel–Premier Tech	Liam Slock
5	Samuel Watson	Matteo Trentin	Matteo Trentin	Jimmy Janssens	Cole Kessler	Frederik Wandahl	Israel–Premier Tech	Dries De Bondt
Final		Matteo Trentin	Matteo Trentin	Jimmy Janssens	Cole Kessler	Frederik Wandahl	Israel–Premier Tech	Not awarded

== Classification standings ==
Legend
Denotes the leader of the general classification	Denotes the leader of the sprints classification
Denotes the leader of the points classification	Denotes the leader of the young rider classification
Denotes the leader of the mountains classification	

=== General classification ===
Final general classification (1–10)
Rank	Rider	Team	Time
1	Matteo Trentin (ITA)	Tudor Pro Cycling Team	22h 02' 46"
2	Corbin Strong (NZL)	Israel–Premier Tech	+ 0"
3	Alex Kirsch (LUX)	Lidl–Trek	+ 15"
4	Stan Dewulf (BEL)	Decathlon–AG2R La Mondiale	+ 18"
5	Frederik Wandahl (DEN)	Red Bull–Bora–Hansgrohe	+ 18"
6	Simon Clarke (AUS)	Israel–Premier Tech	+ 18"
7	Carlos Canal (ESP)	Movistar Team	+ 19"
8	Natnael Tesfatsion (ERI)	Lidl–Trek	+ 19"
9	Rudy Molard (FRA)	Groupama–FDJ	+ 19"
10	Dylan Teuns (BEL)	Israel–Premier Tech	+ 19"

=== Points classification ===
Final points classification (1–10)
Rank	Rider	Team	Points
1	Matteo Trentin (ITA)	Tudor Pro Cycling Team	46
2	Corbin Strong (NZL)	Israel–Premier Tech	44
3	Emilien Jeannière (FRA)	Team TotalEnergies	43
4	Paul Penhoët (FRA)	Decathlon–AG2R La Mondiale	30
5	Madis Mihkels (EST)	Intermarché–Wanty	30
6	Timo Kielich (BEL)	Alpecin–Deceuninck	28
7	Samuel Watson (GBR)	Groupama–FDJ	25
8	Markus Hoelgaard (NOR)	Uno-X Mobility	25
9	Jordi Meeus (BEL)	Red Bull–Bora–Hansgrohe	25
10	Jimmy Janssens (BEL)	Alpecin–Deceuninck	20

=== Mountains classification ===
Final mountains classification (1–10)
Rank	Rider	Team	Points
1	Jimmy Janssens (BEL)	Alpecin–Deceuninck	80
2	Markus Hoelgaard (NOR)	Uno-X Mobility	52
3	Johan Jacobs (SUI)	Movistar Team	40
4	Gilles De Wilde (BEL)	Team Flanders–Baloise	22
5	Cole Kessler (USA)	Lidl–Trek	22
6	Michael Gogl (AUT)	Alpecin–Deceuninck	20
7	Liam Slock (BEL)	Lotto–Dstny	14
8	Thomas Bonnet (FRA)	Team TotalEnergies	14
9	William Blume Levy (DEN)	Uno-X Mobility	12
10	Filip Maciejuk (POL)	Red Bull–Bora–Hansgrohe	12

=== Sprints classification ===
Final sprints classification (1–10)
Rank	Rider	Team	Points
1	Cole Kessler (USA)	Lidl–Trek	19
2	Markus Hoelgaard (NOR)	Uno-X Mobility	13
3	Baptiste Veistroffer (FRA)	Decathlon–AG2R La Mondiale	13
4	Matteo Trentin (ITA)	Tudor Pro Cycling Team	8
5	Johan Jacobs (SUI)	Movistar Team	8
6	Dries De Bondt (BEL)	Decathlon–AG2R La Mondiale	8
7	Lilian Calmejane (FRA)	Intermarché–Wanty	6
8	Alex Kirsch (LUX)	Lidl–Trek	6
9	Jimmy Janssens (BEL)	Alpecin–Deceuninck	6
10	Corbin Strong (NZL)	Israel–Premier Tech	5

=== Young rider classification ===
Final young rider classification (1–10)
Rank	Rider	Team	Time
1	Frederik Wandahl (DEN)	Red Bull–Bora–Hansgrohe	22h 03' 04"
2	Carlos Canal (ESP)	Movistar Team	+ 1"
3	Per Strand Hagenes (NOR)	Visma–Lease a Bike	+ 1"
4	Alec Segaert (BEL)	Lotto–Dstny	+ 16"
5	Samuel Watson (GBR)	Groupama–FDJ	+ 2' 33"
6	Tibor Del Grosso (NED)	Alpecin–Deceuninck	+ 3' 16"
7	Pim Ronhaar (NED)	Baloise–Trek Lions	+ 7' 23"
8	Paul Penhoët (FRA)	Groupama–FDJ	+ 11' 12"
9	Pierre Gautherat (FRA)	Decathlon–AG2R La Mondiale	+ 12' 40"
10	Sakarias Koller Løland (NOR)	Uno-X Mobility	+ 13' 16"

=== Team classification ===
Final team classification (1–10)
Rank	Team	Time
1	Israel–Premier Tech	66h 09' 15"
2	(United States) Lidl–Trek	+ 29"
3	(Belgium) Bingoal WB	+ 3' 50"
4	(France) Arkéa–B&B Hotels	+ 5' 34"
5	(France) Groupama–FDJ	+ 5' 39"
6	(Belgium) Alpecin–Deceuninck	+ 6' 00"
7	(Norway) Uno-X Mobility	+ 7' 41"
8	(Belgium) Intermarché–Wanty	+ 7' 51"
9	(Belgium) Lotto–Dstny	+ 8' 27"
10	(Spain) Movistar Team	+ 12' 23"
