= 2026 Four Days of Dunkirk =

French cycling race

2026 UCI ProSeries

Race details
- Dates: 20–24 May 2026
- Stages: 5
- Distance: 870.9 km (541.2 mi)
- Winning time: 19h 35' 55"

Results
Jersey awarded to the overall winner	Winner	Laurence Pithie (NZL)	(Red Bull–Bora–Hansgrohe)
	Second	Natnael Tesfatsion (ERI)	(Movistar Team)
	Third	Rasmus Tiller (NOR)	(Uno-X Mobility)
Jersey awarded to the points classification winner	Points	Laurence Pithie (NZL)	(Red Bull–Bora–Hansgrohe)
Jersey awarded to the mountains classification winner	Mountains	Victor Papon (FRA)	(Nice Métropole Côte d'Azur)
Jersey awarded to the young rider classification winner	Young rider	Laurence Pithie (NZL)	(Red Bull–Bora–Hansgrohe)
	Team	(Spain) Movistar Team	

The 2026 Four Days of Dunkirk (French: Quatre Jours de Dunkerque 2025) was a road cycling stage race that took place between 20 and 24 May 2026 in the French administrative region of Hauts-de-France. The race was rated as a category 2.Pro event on the 2026 UCI ProSeries calendar, and was the 70th edition of the Four Days of Dunkirk.

== Teams ==
Ten UCI WorldTeams, four UCI ProTeams and four UCI Continental teams made up the eighteen teams that participated in the race.

UCI WorldTeams

- Decathlon CMA CGM
- EF Education–EasyPost
- Groupama–FDJ United
- Lotto–Intermarché
- Movistar Team
- Netcompany INEOS
- NSN Cycling Team
- Red Bull–Bora–Hansgrohe
- Team Picnic–PostNL
- Uno-X Mobility

UCI ProTeams

- Cofidis
- Team TotalEnergies
- Tudor Pro Cycling Team
- Unibet Rose Rockets

UCI Continental Teams

- CIC Pro Cycling Academy
- Nice Métropole Côte d'Azur
- St. Michel–Preference Home–Auber93
- Van Rysel–Roubaix

== Route ==
Stage characteristics and winners
Stage	Date	Course	Distance	Type	Stage winner
1	20 May	Lagny-le-Sec to Laon	177.3 km (110.2 mi)	Hilly stage	Laurence Pithie (NZL)
2	21 May	Glisy to Liévin	187.4 km (116.4 mi)	Hilly stage	Victor Papon (FRA)
3	22 May	La Sentinelle to Wallers Arenberg	157.7 km (98.0 mi)	Flat stage	Rasmus Tiller (NOR)
4	23 May	Bergues to Cassel	167.2 km (103.9 mi)	Hilly stage	Natnael Tesfatsion (ERI)
5	24 May	Saint-Omer to Dunkirk	181.3 km (112.7 mi)	Flat stage	Jordi Meeus (BEL)
Total			870.9 km (541.2 mi)		

== Stages ==
=== Stage 1 ===
20 May 2026 – Lagny-le-Sec to Laon, 177.3 km (110.2 mi)

Stage 1 Result
Rank	Rider	Team	Time
1	Laurence Pithie (NZL)	Red Bull–Bora–Hansgrohe	3h 54' 20"
2	Bryan Coquard (FRA)	Cofidis	+ 0"
3	Lewis Askey (GBR)	NSN Cycling Team	+ 0"
4	Thibaud Gruel (FRA)	Groupama–FDJ United	+ 0"
5	Antoine L'Hote (FRA)	Decathlon CMA CGM	+ 0"
6	Clément Izquierdo (FRA)	Cofidis	+ 0"
7	Marijn van den Berg (NED)	EF Education–EasyPost	+ 0"
8	Carlos Canal (ESP)	Movistar Team	+ 0"
9	Rasmus Tiller (NOR)	Uno-X Mobility	+ 0"
10	Matys Grisel (FRA)	Lotto–Intermarché	+ 0"

General classification after Stage 1
Rank	Rider	Team	Time
1	Laurence Pithie (NZL)	Red Bull–Bora–Hansgrohe	3h 54' 10"
2	Bryan Coquard (FRA)	Cofidis	+ 4"
3	Lewis Askey (GBR)	NSN Cycling Team	+ 6"
4	Thibaud Gruel (FRA)	Groupama–FDJ United	+ 10"
5	Antoine L'Hote (FRA)	Decathlon CMA CGM	+ 10"
6	Clément Izquierdo (FRA)	Cofidis	+ 10"
7	Marijn van den Berg (NED)	EF Education–EasyPost	+ 10"
8	Carlos Canal (ESP)	Movistar Team	+ 10"
9	Rasmus Tiller (NOR)	Uno-X Mobility	+ 10"
10	Matys Grisel (FRA)	Lotto–Intermarché	+ 10"

=== Stage 2 ===
21 May 2026 – Glisy to Liévin, 187.4 km (116.4 mi)

Stage 2 Result
Rank	Rider	Team	Time
1	Victor Papon (FRA)	Nice Métropole Côte d'Azur	4h 13' 36"
2	Maël Guégan (FRA)	CIC Pro Cycling Academy	+ 0"
3	Kévin Avoine (FRA)	Van Rysel–Roubaix	+ 0"
4	Daniel Årnes (NOR)	Van Rysel–Roubaix	+ 0"
5	Laurence Pithie (NZL)	Red Bull–Bora–Hansgrohe	+ 7"
6	Jordi Meeus (BEL)	Red Bull–Bora–Hansgrohe	+ 7"
7	Stian Fredheim (NOR)	Uno-X Mobility	+ 7"
8	Danny van Poppel (NED)	Red Bull–Bora–Hansgrohe	+ 7"
9	Tobias Müller (GER)	Unibet Rose Rockets	+ 7"
10	Lewis Askey (GBR)	NSN Cycling Team	+ 7"

General classification after Stage 2
Rank	Rider	Team	Time
1	Laurence Pithie (NZL)	Red Bull–Bora–Hansgrohe	8h 07' 53"
2	Bryan Coquard (FRA)	Cofidis	+ 4"
3	Lewis Askey (GBR)	NSN Cycling Team	+ 6"
4	Marijn van den Berg (NED)	EF Education–EasyPost	+ 10"
5	Kim Heiduk (GER)	Netcompany INEOS	+ 10"
6	Maxime Vezie (FRA)	CIC Pro Cycling Academy	+ 10"
7	Antoine L'Hote (FRA)	Decathlon CMA CGM	+ 10"
8	Thibaud Gruel (FRA)	Groupama–FDJ United	+ 10"
9	Liam Slock (BEL)	Lotto–Intermarché	+ 10"
10	Kasper Asgreen (DEN)	EF Education–EasyPost	+ 10"

=== Stage 3 ===
22 May 2026 – La Sentinelle to Wallers Arenberg, 157.7 km (98.0 mi)

Stage 3 Result
Rank	Rider	Team	Time
1	Rasmus Tiller (NOR)	Uno-X Mobility	3h 25' 43"
2	Laurence Pithie (NZL)	Red Bull–Bora–Hansgrohe	+ 4"
3	Jason Tesson (FRA)	Team TotalEnergies	+ 4"
4	Artem Shmidt (USA)	Netcompany INEOS	+ 4"
5	Joppe Heremans (BEL)	Van Rysel–Roubaix	+ 4"
6	Liam Slock (BEL)	Lotto–Intermarché	+ 4"
7	Petr Kelemen (CZE)	Tudor Pro Cycling Team	+ 4"
8	Oscar Chamberlain (AUS)	Decathlon CMA CGM	+ 4"
9	Gonzalo Serrano (ESP)	Movistar Team	+ 4"
10	Benjamin Thomas (FRA)	Cofidis	+ 4"

General classification after Stage 3
Rank	Rider	Team	Time
1	Laurence Pithie (NZL)	Red Bull–Bora–Hansgrohe	11h 33' 34"
2	Rasmus Tiller (NOR)	Uno-X Mobility	+ 2"
3	Joppe Heremans (BEL)	Van Rysel–Roubaix	+ 16"
4	Liam Slock (BEL)	Lotto–Intermarché	+ 16"
5	Gonzalo Serrano (ESP)	Movistar Team	+ 16"
6	Artem Shmidt (USA)	Netcompany INEOS	+ 16"
7	Benjamin Thomas (FRA)	Cofidis	+ 16"
8	Alexys Brunel (FRA)	Team TotalEnergies	+ 26"
9	Bryan Coquard (FRA)	Cofidis	+ 29"
10	Lewis Askey (GBR)	NSN Cycling Team	+ 31"

=== Stage 4 ===
23 May 2026 – Bergues to Cassel, 167.2 km (103.9 mi)

Stage 4 Result
Rank	Rider	Team	Time
1	Natnael Tesfatsion (ERI)	Movistar Team	4h 00' 19"
2	Stan Dewulf (BEL)	Decathlon CMA CGM	+ 3"
3	Kim Heiduk (GER)	Netcompany INEOS	+ 7"
4	Sam Maisonobe (FRA)	Cofidis	+ 13"
5	Liam Slock (BEL)	Lotto–Intermarché	+ 16"
6	Lewis Askey (GBR)	NSN Cycling Team	+ 16"
7	Laurence Pithie (NZL)	Red Bull–Bora–Hansgrohe	+ 18"
8	Carlos Canal (ESP)	Movistar Team	+ 20"
9	Thibaud Gruel (FRA)	Groupama–FDJ United	+ 20"
10	Luke Lamperti (USA)	EF Education–EasyPost	+ 20"

General classification after Stage 4
Rank	Rider	Team	Time
1	Laurence Pithie (NZL)	Red Bull–Bora–Hansgrohe	15h 34' 11"
2	Natnael Tesfatsion (ERI)	Movistar Team	+ 7"
3	Rasmus Tiller (NOR)	Uno-X Mobility	+ 11"
4	Liam Slock (BEL)	Lotto–Intermarché	+ 14"
5	Stan Dewulf (BEL)	Decathlon CMA CGM	+ 14"
6	Kim Heiduk (GER)	Netcompany INEOS	+ 20"
7	Lewis Askey (GBR)	NSN Cycling Team	+ 29"
8	Sam Maisonobe (FRA)	Cofidis	+ 30"
9	Artem Shmidt (USA)	Netcompany INEOS	+ 36"
10	Thibaud Gruel (FRA)	Groupama–FDJ United	+ 37"

=== Stage 5 ===
24 May 2026 – Saint-Omer to Dunkirk, 181.3 km (112.7 mi)

Stage 5 Result
Rank	Rider	Team	Time
1	Jordi Meeus (BEL)	Red Bull–Bora–Hansgrohe	4h 01' 44"
2	Danny van Poppel (NED)	Red Bull–Bora–Hansgrohe	+ 0"
3	Gianluca Pollefliet (BEL)	Decathlon CMA CGM	+ 0"
4	Hugo Hofstetter (FRA)	NSN Cycling Team	+ 0"
5	Tobias Müller (GER)	Unibet Rose Rockets	+ 0"
6	Niklas Märkl (GER)	Team Picnic–PostNL	+ 0"
7	Erik Nordsæter Resell (NOR)	Uno-X Mobility	+ 0"
8	Joppe Heremans (BEL)	Van Rysel–Roubaix	+ 0"
9	Joren Bloem (NED)	Unibet Rose Rockets	+ 0"
10	Stan Dewulf (BEL)	Decathlon CMA CGM	+ 0"

General classification after Stage 5
Rank	Rider	Team	Time
1	Laurence Pithie (NZL)	Red Bull–Bora–Hansgrohe	19h 35' 55"
2	Natnael Tesfatsion (ERI)	Movistar Team	+ 7"
3	Rasmus Tiller (NOR)	Uno-X Mobility	+ 11"
4	Stan Dewulf (BEL)	Decathlon CMA CGM	+ 14"
5	Liam Slock (BEL)	Lotto–Intermarché	+ 14"
6	Kim Heiduk (GER)	Netcompany INEOS	+ 20"
7	Lewis Askey (GBR)	NSN Cycling Team	+ 29"
8	Sam Maisonobe (FRA)	Cofidis	+ 30"
9	Artem Shmidt (USA)	Netcompany INEOS	+ 36"
10	Thibaud Gruel (FRA)	Groupama–FDJ United	+ 37"

== Classification leadership table ==
Classification leadership by stage
Stage	Winner	General classification	Points classification	Mountains classification	Young rider classification	Team classification
1	Laurence Pithie	Laurence Pithie	Laurence Pithie	Victor Papon	Laurence Pithie	Cofidis
2	Victor Papon	Laurence Pithie	Victor Papon	Victor Papon	Laurence Pithie	Cofidis
3	Rasmus Tiller	Laurence Pithie	Laurence Pithie	Victor Papon	Laurence Pithie	Movistar Team
4	Natnael Tesfatsion	Laurence Pithie	Laurence Pithie	Victor Papon	Laurence Pithie	Movistar Team
5	Jordi Meeus	Laurence Pithie	Laurence Pithie	Victor Papon	Laurence Pithie	Movistar Team
Final		Laurence Pithie	Laurence Pithie	Victor Papon	Laurence Pithie	Movistar Team

== Classification standings ==
Legend
Denotes the winner of the general classification	Denotes the winner of the mountains classification
Denotes the winner of the points classification	Denotes the winner of the young rider classification
Denotes the winner of the team classification	

=== General classification ===
Final general classification (1–10)
Rank	Rider	Team	Time
1	Laurence Pithie (NZL)	Red Bull–Bora–Hansgrohe	19h 35' 55"
2	Natnael Tesfatsion (ERI)	Movistar Team	+ 7"
3	Rasmus Tiller (NOR)	Uno-X Mobility	+ 11"
4	Stan Dewulf (BEL)	Decathlon CMA CGM	+ 14"
5	Liam Slock (BEL)	Lotto–Intermarché	+ 14"
6	Kim Heiduk (GER)	Netcompany INEOS	+ 20"
7	Lewis Askey (GBR)	NSN Cycling Team	+ 29"
8	Sam Maisonobe (FRA)	Cofidis	+ 30"
9	Artem Shmidt (USA)	Netcompany INEOS	+ 36"
10	Thibaud Gruel (FRA)	Groupama–FDJ United	+ 37"

=== Points classification ===
Final points classification (1–10)
Rank	Rider	Team	Points
1	Laurence Pithie (NZL)	Red Bull–Bora–Hansgrohe	37
2	Victor Papon (FRA)	Nice Métropole Côte d'Azur	29
3	Jordi Meeus (BEL)	Red Bull–Bora–Hansgrohe	20
4	Rasmus Tiller (NOR)	Uno-X Mobility	17
5	Kévin Avoine (FRA)	Van Rysel–Roubaix	16
6	Natnael Tesfatsion (ERI)	Movistar Team	15
7	Maël Guégan (FRA)	CIC Pro Cycling Academy	15
8	Lewis Askey (GBR)	NSN Cycling Team	15
9	Danny van Poppel (NED)	Red Bull–Bora–Hansgrohe	12
10	Stan Dewulf (BEL)	Decathlon CMA CGM	13

=== Mountains classification ===
Final mountains classification (1–10)
Rank	Rider	Team	Points
1	Victor Papon (FRA)	Nice Métropole Côte d'Azur	47
2	Kévin Avoine (FRA)	Van Rysel–Roubaix	15
3	Fabien Doubey (FRA)	Team TotalEnergies	10
4	Wessel Mouris (NED)	Unibet Rose Rockets	9
5	Jaakko Hänninen (FIN)	Nice Métropole Côte d'Azur	6
6	Théo Delacroix (FRA)	St. Michel–Preference Home–Auber93	5
7	Louis Chaleil (FRA)	Decathlon CMA CGM	5
8	Tom Mainguenaud (FRA)	Nice Métropole Côte d'Azur	5
9	Kim Heiduk (GER)	Netcompany INEOS	4
10	Stan Dewulf (BEL)	Decathlon CMA CGM	4

=== Young rider classification ===
Final young rider classification (1–10)
Rank	Rider	Team	Time
1	Laurence Pithie (NZL)	Red Bull–Bora–Hansgrohe	19h 35' 55"
2	Sam Maisonobe (FRA)	Cofidis	+ 30"
3	Artem Shmidt (USA)	Netcompany INEOS	+ 36"
4	Thibaud Gruel (FRA)	Groupama–FDJ United	+ 37"
5	Carlos Canal (ESP)	Movistar Team	+ 37"
6	Clément Izquierdo (FRA)	Cofidis	+ 37"
7	Robbe Dhondt (BEL)	Team Picnic–PostNL	+ 40"
8	Antoine L'Hote (FRA)	Decathlon CMA CGM	+ 44"
9	Rayan Boulahoite (FRA)	Team TotalEnergies	+ 59"
10	Wessel Mouris (NED)	Unibet Rose Rockets	+ 1' 03"

=== Team classification ===
Final team classification (1–10)
Rank	Team	Time
1	(Spain) Movistar Team	58h 48' 56"
2	(France) Cofidis	+ 39"
3	(France) Team TotalEnergies	+ 2' 13"
4	(France) Decathlon CMA CGM	+ 6' 55"
5	(Belgium) Lotto–Intermarché	+ 7' 04"
6	(France) Unibet Rose Rockets	+ 7' 13"
7	(Norway) Uno-X Mobility	+ 8' 16"
8	(Switzerland) NSN Cycling Team	+ 12' 40"
9	(United Kingdom) Netcompany INEOS	+ 13' 40"
10	(France) Van Rysel–Roubaix	+ 13' 47"
