= Lagny =

Lagny is the name or part of the name of three communes of France:

- Lagny, Oise in the Oise département
- Lagny-le-Sec in the Oise département
- Lagny-sur-Marne in the Seine-et-Marne département
