= Laurence Pithie =

New Zealand cyclist (born 2002)

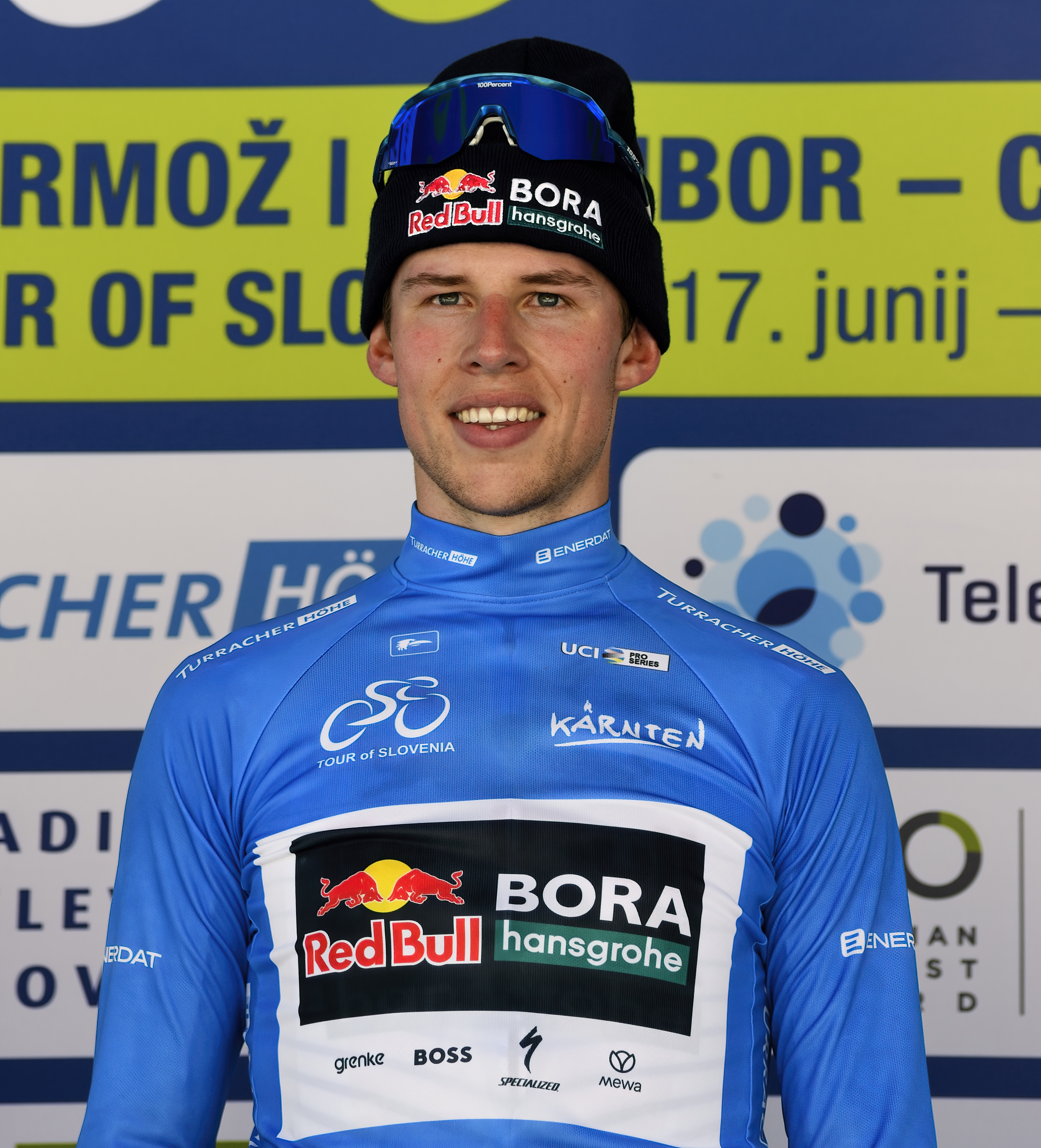
- Pithie at 2026 Tour of Slovenia

Personal information
- Born: 17 July 2002 (age 24) Christchurch, New Zealand
- Height: 187 cm (6 ft 2 in)
- Weight: 74 kg (163 lb)

Cycling career
- Sport: Cycling
- Current team: Red Bull–Bora–Hansgrohe
- Discipline: Road
- Role: Rider
- Rider type: Classics specialist

Amateur team
- 2020: Willebrord Wil Vooruit Juniors

Professional teams
- 2021–2022: Équipe Continentale Groupama–FDJ
- 2023–2024: Groupama–FDJ
- 2025–: Red Bull–Bora–Hansgrohe

Major wins
- Stage races Four Days of Dunkirk (2026) One-day races and Classics Great Ocean Road Race (2024)
Medal record
Men's track cycling
Representing New Zealand
World Junior Championships
Gold medal – first place	2019 Frankfurt	Omnium
Gold medal – first place	2019 Frankfurt	Madison

Laurence Pithie (born 17 July 2002) is a New Zealand professional racing cyclist, who currently rides for UCI WorldTeam Red Bull–Bora–Hansgrohe.

Pithie attended Christchurch Boys' High School from 2016 to 2020.

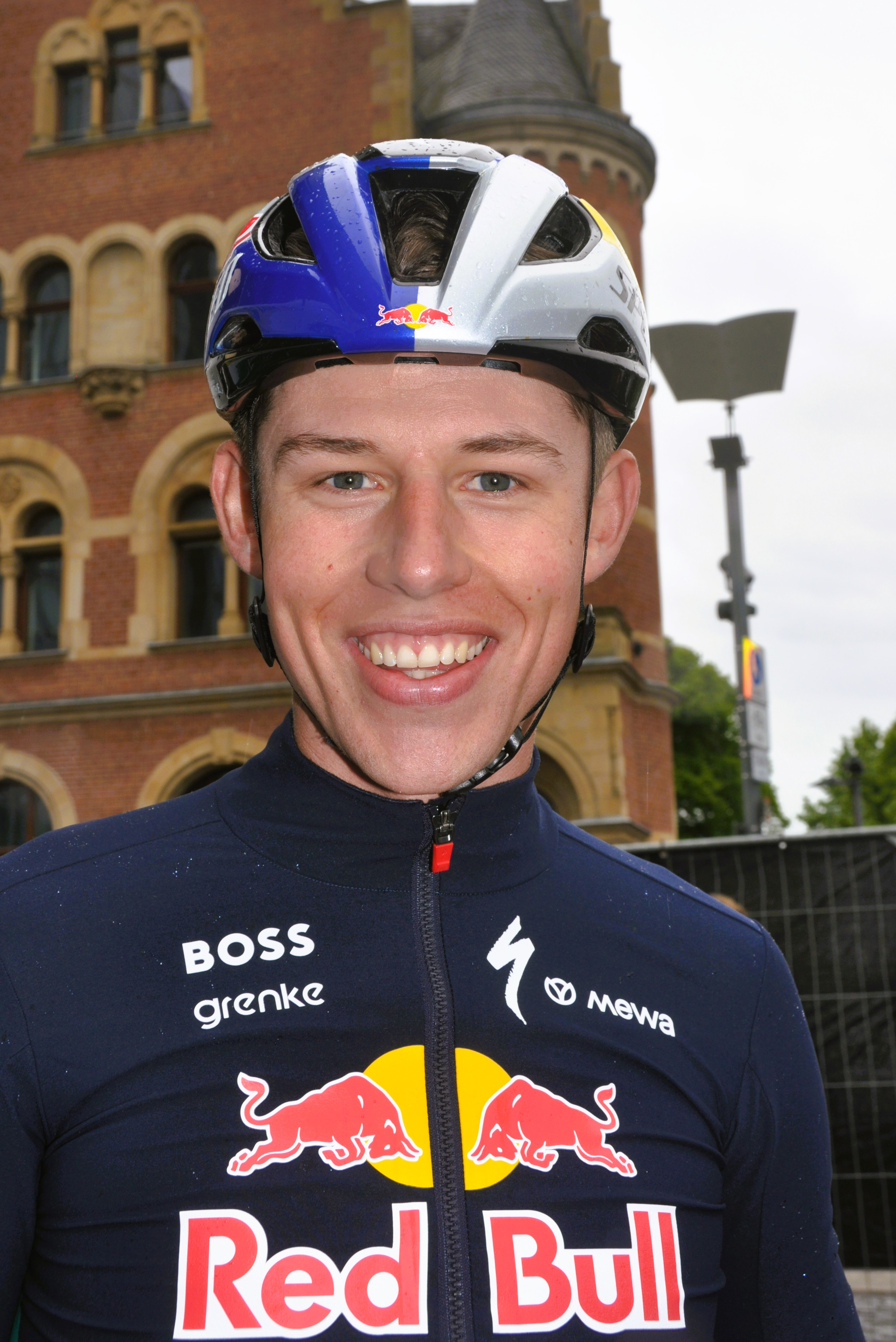
Pithie at Rund um Köln 2026

== Career ==
As a 17-year-old Pithie won two gold medals at the UCI Junior World Championships in the Madison and Omnium. In 2019 Pithie won the national criterium champs allowing him to wear the national jersey in all criteriums for that year. Pithie started the 2021 season off with top 10's in the sprint stages at the New Zealand Cycle Classic. Then fourth in Slovenia after leading out teammate Marijn van den Berg to victory. He finally nabbed a podium in the Circuit de Wallonie behind winner Christophe Laporte. He held his form to the Tour de la Mirabelle where a second place in the reduced bunch finish of Stage 2 brought him to seventh overall. Pithie's greatest accomplishment came at the Baltic Chain Tour where he finished 2nd in every stage which allowed him to win Overall.

In 2025, Pithie is to make his Tour de France debut as the only New Zealand rider in the race, with his role being a domestique and protector for Primoz Roglic.

Pithie won Four days of Dunkirk in 2026. He won the opening stage He then came fifth, second, seventh and 45th in the following four stages. The final stage was challenging as he was involved in a crash early in the stage, he then had a puncture and needed to change his bike in the last five kilometres and being caught up behind a crash in the finale. Pithie said of the final stage: “I flatted with 5 kilometres to go, so switched bikes with Callum [Thornley]. That was great because I could make it back into the peloton. I tried to come to the front with my team, but a crash in the final kilometre, it was really close to taking me down,"

== Major results ==
=== Road ===
2019
1st Criterium, National Championships
2nd Time trial, Oceania Junior Championships
2021
1st Overall Baltic Chain Tour

1st Points classification
1st Youth classification

1st Stage 1 (TTT) New Zealand Cycle Classic
3rd Circuit de Wallonie
4th GP Adria Mobil
7th Overall Tour de la Mirabelle
2022
National Championships

1st Under-23 Road race
2nd Under-23 Time trial
3rd Road race

1st Grand Prix de la ville de Pérenchies
1st Stage 3 Tour de Normandie
3rd Overall New Zealand Cycle Classic

1st Youth classification

3rd Gran Premio Sportivi di Poggiana
8th Grote Prijs Jean-Pierre Monseré
10th Paris–Troyes
2023 (1 pro win)
1st Cholet-Pays de la Loire
2nd Classic Loire Atlantique
5th Hamburg Cyclassics
5th Circuit de Wallonie
5th Grand Prix d'Isbergues
8th Nokere Koerse
2024 (1)
1st Cadel Evans Great Ocean Road Race
2nd Grand Prix d'Isbergues
National Championships

3rd Road race
3rd Time trial

5th Surf Coast Classic
7th Paris–Roubaix
8th Le Samyn
10th Grand Prix de Fourmies
2025
3rd Cadel Evans Great Ocean Road Race
5th Time trial, National Championships
2026 (6)
1st Overall Four Days of Dunkirk

1st Points classification
1st Young rider classification
1st Stage 1

1st Rund um Köln
Tour of Slovenia

1st Points classification
1st Stages 1 & 3

2nd Flandrien 0.0 Classic
3rd Hamburg Cyclassics
4th Overall Tour de Wallonie

1st Young rider classification
1st Stage 3

5th Dwars door Vlaanderen
6th Cadel Evans Great Ocean Road Race

==== Grand Tour general classification results timeline ====
Grand Tour	2024	2025
Giro d'Italia	103	—
Tour de France	—	89
Vuelta a España	—	—

Legend
—	Did not compete
DNF	Did not finish

=== Track ===
2019
UCI World Junior Championships

1st Omnium
1st Madison (with Kiaan Watts)

National Junior Championships

1st Omnium
3rd Team pursuit
3rd Kiko

1st Individual pursuit, Oceania Junior Championships
2020
National Championships

1st Team pursuit
1st Madison (with Thomas Sexton)
