= Jordi Meeus =

Belgian cyclist (born 1998)

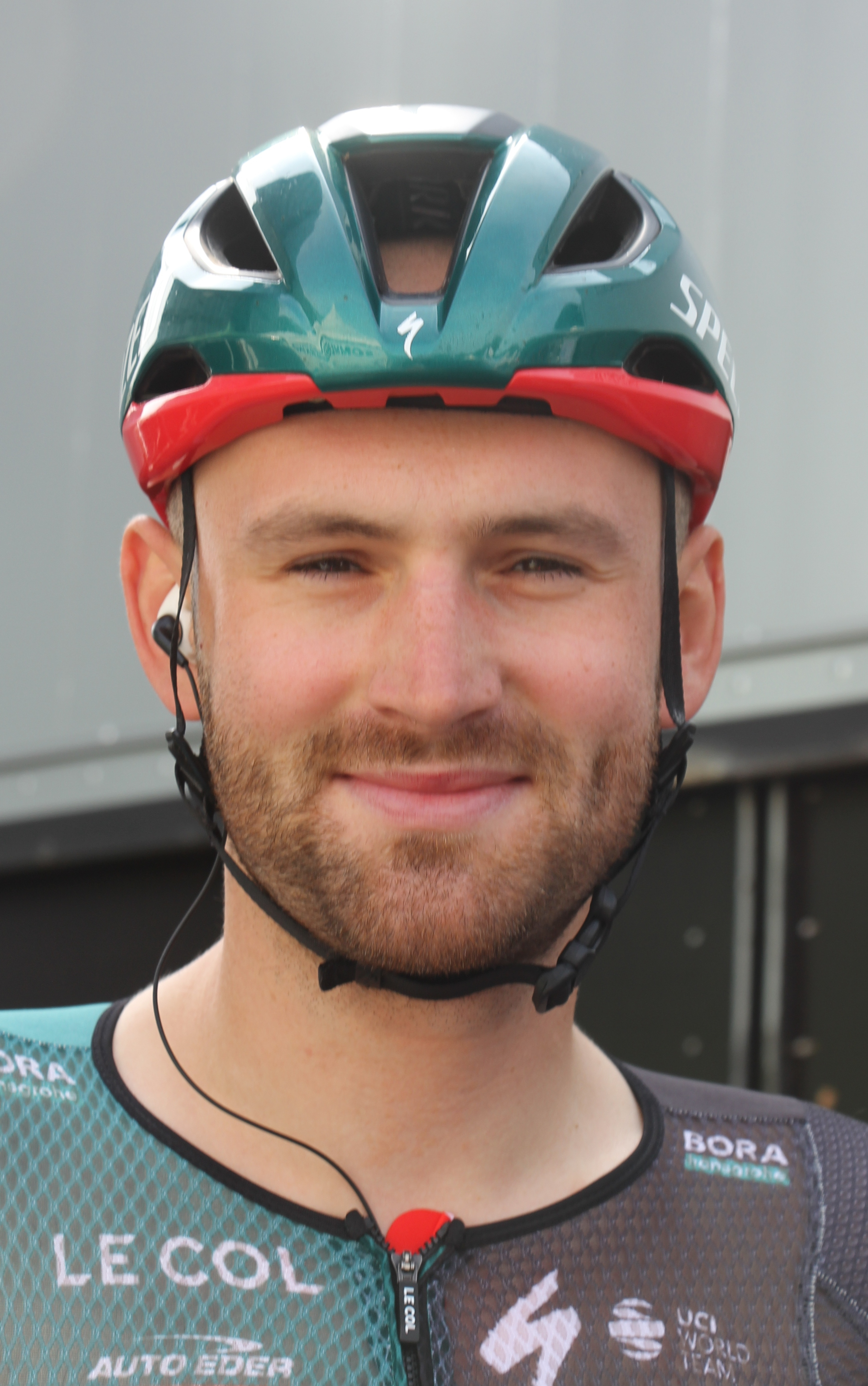
- Meeus in 2023

Personal information
- Full name: Jordi Meeus
- Born: 1 July 1998 (age 28) Lommel, Belgium
- Height: 1.90 m (6 ft 3 in)
- Weight: 80 kg (176 lb)

Cycling career
- Sport: Cycling
- Current team: Red Bull–Bora–Hansgrohe
- Discipline: Road
- Role: Rider
- Rider type: Sprinter

Amateur teams
- 2016–2017: Acrog–Balen BC
- 2017: SEG Racing Academy (stagiaire)

Professional teams
- 2018–2020: SEG Racing Academy
- 2021–: Bora–Hansgrohe

Major wins
- Grand Tours Tour de France 1 individual stage (2023) One-day races and Classics Primus Classic (2022) Copenhagen Sprint (2025) Brussels Cycling Classic (2026)

Jordi Meeus (born 1 July 1998 in Lommel) is a Belgian cyclist, who currently rides for UCI WorldTeam Red Bull–Bora–Hansgrohe. A sprinter, his most noteworthy victory was the last stage of the 2023 Tour de France on the Champs-Élysées ahead of Jasper Philipsen. Other notable victories of his include the 2021 Paris–Bourges, the 2022 Primus Classic, and the 2023 Circuit de Wallonie.

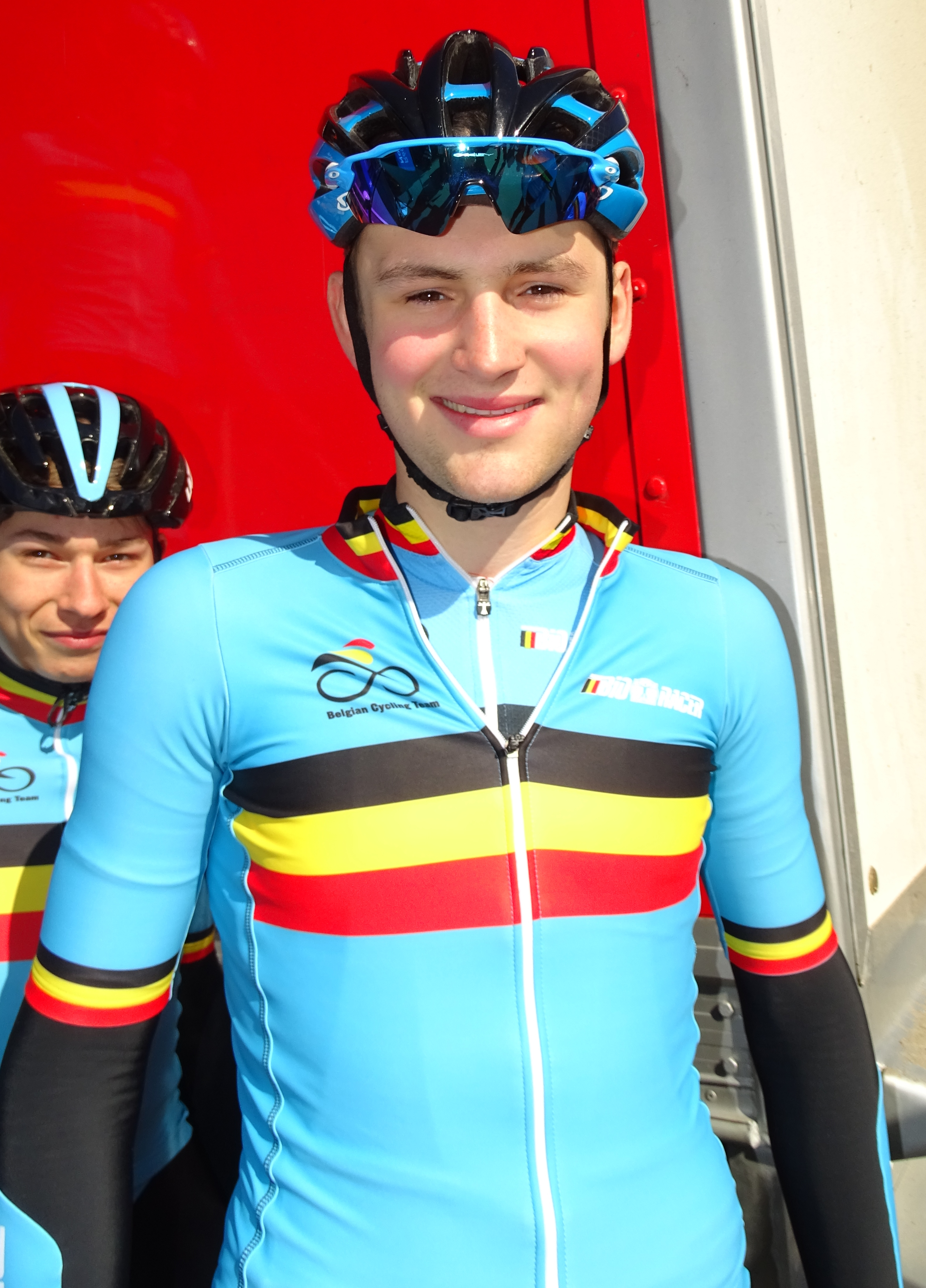
Meeus at the 2016 Paris-Roubaix Juniors

== Major results ==
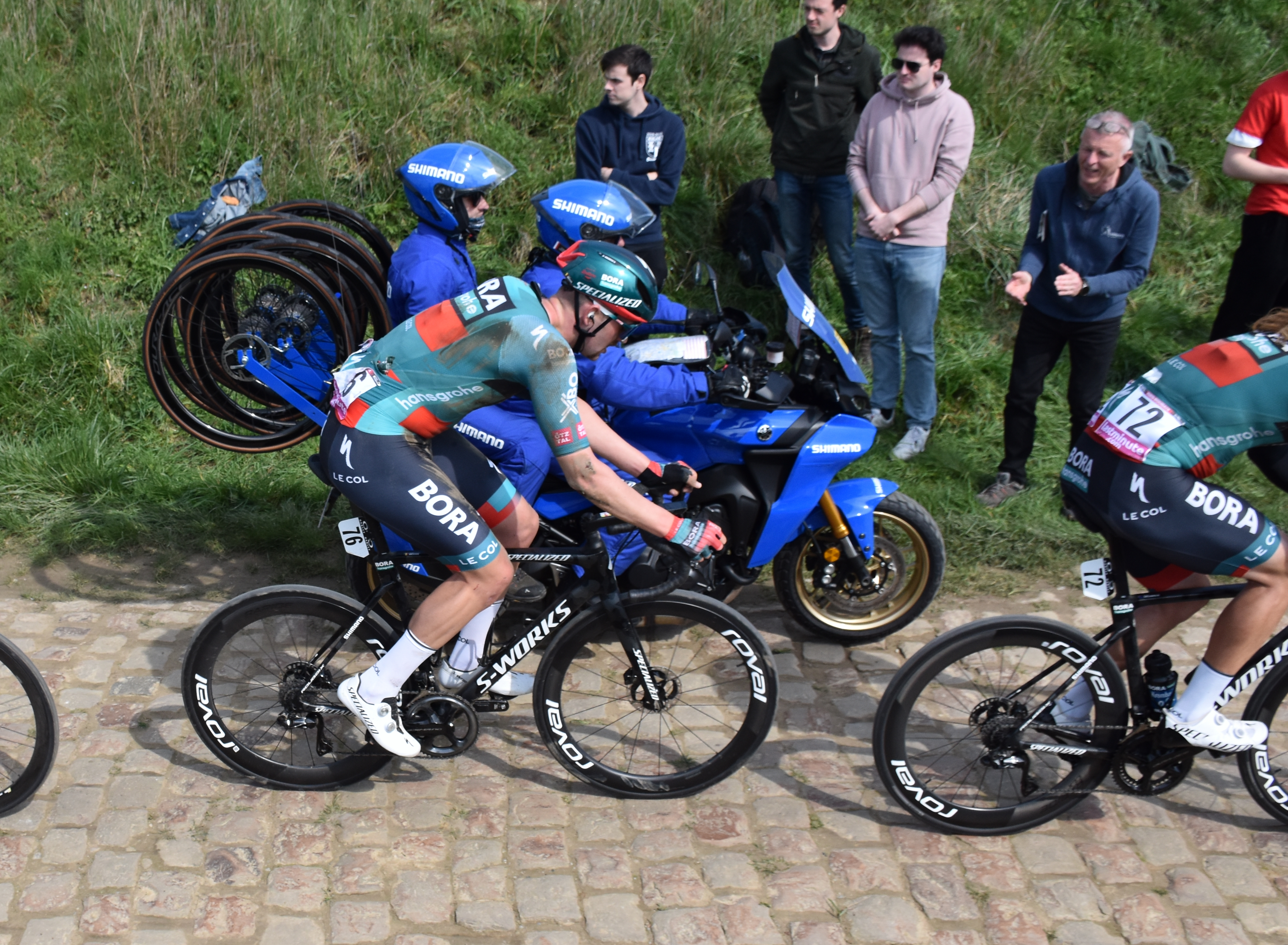
Meeus during the 2023 Paris-Roubaix

2016
2nd Omloop der Vlaamse Gewesten
4th Guido Reybrouck Classic
6th Ronde van Vlaanderen Juniores
9th Kuurne–Brussels–Kuurne Juniors
2018 (1 pro win)
1st Gooikse Pijl
6th Ronde van Midden-Nederland
7th Dorpenomloop Rucphen
10th Overall Olympia's Tour
2019
3rd Gylne Gutuer
4th Road race, National Under-23 Road Championships
6th Memorial Van Coningsloo
10th Slag om Norg
2020 (2)
1st Road race, National Under-23 Road Championships
Czech Cycling Tour

1st Points classification
1st Stages 2 & 3

1st Stage 6 Giro Ciclistico d'Italia
2nd Paris–Tours Espoirs
4th Gooikse Pijl
4th Ster van Zwolle
5th Antwerp Port Epic
7th Road race, UEC European Under-23 Road Championships
10th Dorpenomloop Rucphen
2021 (2)
1st Paris–Bourges
1st Stage 2 Tour de Hongrie
2nd Eurométropole Tour
2nd Grand Prix de Denain
3rd Gooikse Pijl
4th Road race, National Road Championships
4th Nokere Koerse
2022 (2)
1st Primus Classic
1st Stage 5 Tour of Britain
2nd Road race, National Road Championships
5th Paris–Bourges
6th Omloop van het Houtland
8th Gooikse Pijl
2023 (2)
1st Circuit de Wallonie
1st Stage 21 Tour de France
2nd Down Under Classic
2nd Heistse Pijl
3rd Brussels Cycling Classic
3rd Clásica de Almería
3rd Vuelta a Murcia
3rd Paris–Bourges
7th Milano–Torino
8th Kuurne–Brussels–Kuurne
2024 (2)
1st Stage 1 Tour de Wallonie
1st Stage 3 Tour of Norway
2nd Münsterland Giro
2nd Gooikse Pijl
3rd Road race, National Road Championships
3rd Gent–Wevelgem
4th Hamburg Cyclassics
6th Kampioenschap van Vlaanderen
8th Paris–Roubaix
8th Clásica de Almería
2025 (4)
1st Copenhagen Sprint
1st Binche–Chimay–Binche
Volta ao Algarve

1st Points classification
1st Stage 3

1st Stage 6 Tour de Suisse
3rd Super 8 Classic
4th Münsterland Giro
4th Gooikse Pijl
9th Gent–Wevelgem
9th Rund um Köln
2026 (4)
1st Brussels Cycling Classic
1st Le Samyn
1st Stage 1 Tour de Wallonie
1st Stage 5 Four Days of Dunkirk
2nd Münsterland Giro
2nd Nokere Koerse
3rd Classique Dunkerque
3rd Gooikse Pijl
4th Binche–Chimay–Binche
7th Omloop Het Nieuwsblad
10th Kuurne–Brussels–Kuurne

=== Grand Tour general classification results timeline ===
Grand Tour	2021	2022	2023	2024	2025
Giro d'Italia	—	—	—	—	—
Tour de France	—	—	139	—	158
Vuelta a España	139	—	—	—	—

=== Classics results timeline ===
Monument	2021	2022	2023	2024	2025	2026
Milan–San Remo	—	—	—	—	—	—
Tour of Flanders	—	DNF	DNF	DNF	—	—
Paris–Roubaix	88	14	112	8	53	17
Liège–Bastogne–Liège	—	—	—	—	—	—
Giro di Lombardia	—	—	—	—	—	—
Classic	2021	2022	2023	2024	2025	2026
Omloop Het Nieuwsblad	—	114	DNF	DNF	DNF	7
Kuurne–Brussels–Kuurne	82	122	8	12	11	10
Milano–Torino	—	—	7	—	—	—
Gent–Wevelgem	—	DNF	DNF	3	9	36
Scheldeprijs	—	12	15	—	—	14
Hamburg Cyclassics	—	—	—	4	118	
Brussels Cycling Classic	—	—	3	15	—	
Paris–Tours	36	DNF	49	—	—	

Legend
—	Did not compete
DNF	Did not finish
