= Corbin Strong =

New Zealand cyclist (born 2000)

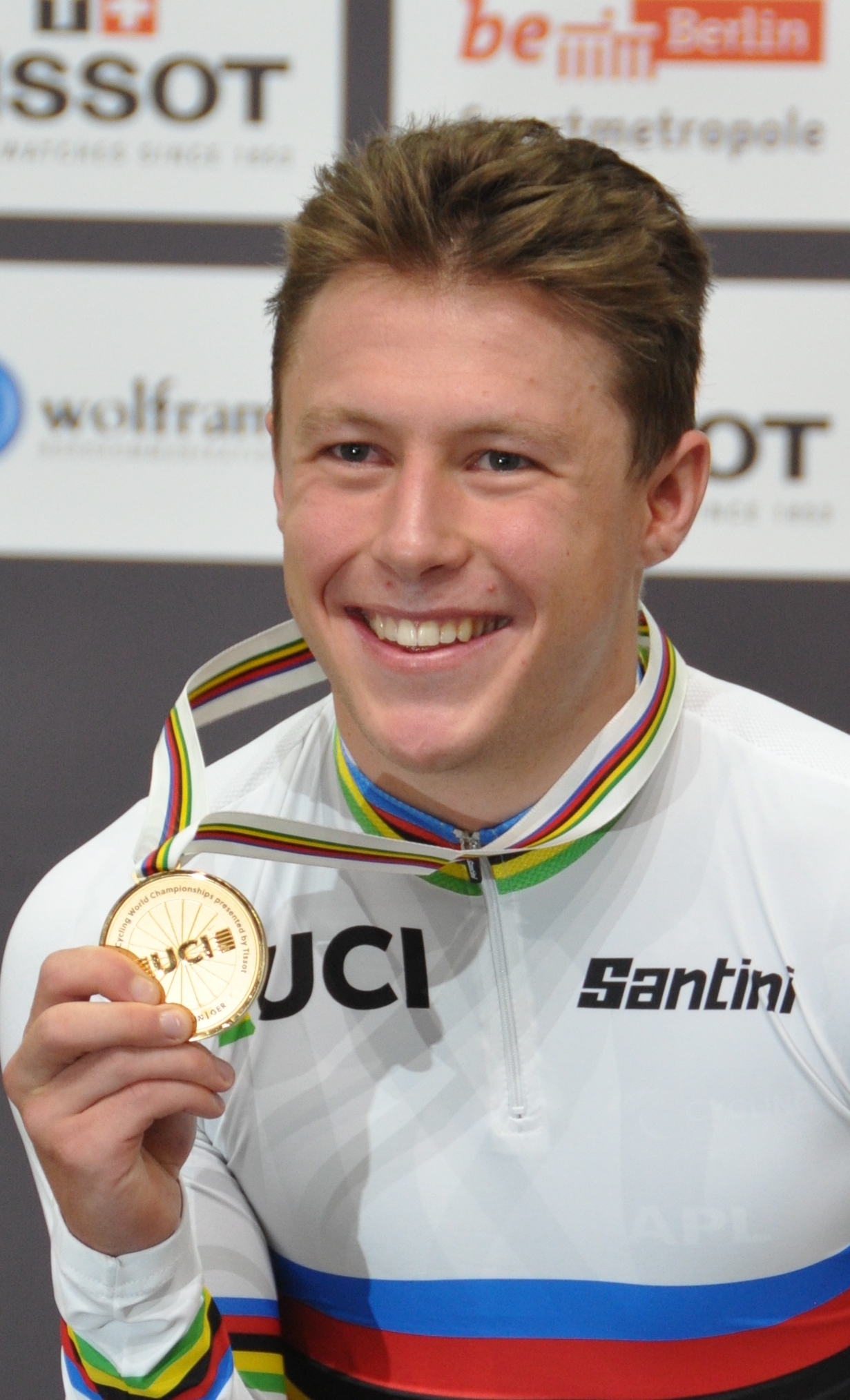
- Strong at the 2020 UCI Track Cycling World Championships

Personal information
- Full name: Corbin John Strong
- Born: 30 April 2000 (age 26) Invercargill, New Zealand
- Height: 1.73 m (5 ft 8 in)
- Weight: 63 kg (139 lb)

Cycling career
- Sport: Cycling
- Current team: NSN Cycling Team
- Disciplines: Track; Road
- Role: Rider
- Rider type: Puncheur

Professional teams
- 2019: St George Continental Cycling Team
- 2020–2021: SEG Racing Academy
- 2022–: Israel–Premier Tech

Major wins
- Road Stage races Arctic Race of Norway (2025) Tour de Wallonie (2025) One-day races and Classics Giro del Veneto (2024) Circuit Franco-Belge (2026) Track World Championships Points race (2020)
Medal record
Men's track cycling
Representing New Zealand
World Championships
| Gold medal – first place | 2020 Berlin | Points race |
| Silver medal – second place | 2020 Berlin | Team pursuit |
| Silver medal – second place | 2022 Saint-Quentin-en-Yvelines | Elimination |
Commonwealth Games
| Gold medal – first place | 2022 Birmingham | Scratch |

Corbin John Strong (born 30 April 2000) is a New Zealand road and track cyclist, who currently rides for UCI WorldTeam NSN Cycling Team. He won the points race and finished second in the team pursuit at the 2020 UCI Track Cycling World Championships.

In 2018, Strong crashed into a stationary car while on a training ride, fracturing his T1 vertebra.

== Career ==
=== Early career ===
Strong started racing in 2019 with the St George Continental Cycling Team and achieved early success in Asian races. He won the Under-23 competition in the Tour de Korea and Tour de Kumano plus the sprint jersey in the Tour de Ijen.

He then spent two seasons with SEG Racing Academy, where a COVID-19 stricken world saw him only compete at the New Zealand Cycle Classic, finishing on the podium with top 5 results in all stages and walking away with the white youth jersey.

The following season Strong won the New Zealand Cycle Classic with the bonus seconds on the final stage pushing him into the lead. It was announced in August 2021 that Strong would ride for UCI WorldTeam Israel Start-Up Nation for the following three seasons.

=== Israel–Premier Tech (2022 to present) ===
==== 2022 ====
His first year of professional cycling started well with top 35 placings in all races he finished. A ninth place in Stage 7 of the Tour of Turkey placed him in 15th overall. Strong took his first professional victory at the shortened Tour of Britain taking the first stage up a punchy slope ahead of Omar Fraile.

==== 2023 ====
Strong went to the 2023 Tour de France as his team's nominated sprinter. He achieved two top ten finishes in bunch sprints most notably ninth in the final stage of the Tour on the Champs-Élysées. Later in the season at the Tour de Luxembourg Strong took his only victory of the season. Winning the mass-sprint first stage to take the leaders jersey, he would lose it the following day.

==== 2024 ====
Strong started his 2024 season at the Down Under Classic, a criterium that preludes the Tour Down Under, where he finished tenth. At the Tour Down Under, Strong finished eighth on the opening stage and with bonus seconds was sitting fourth overall. He moved up to second the following stage before dropping to third after stage four and ultimately retiring from the race on stage 5 due to illness. Strong bounced back from illness to podium at the Surf Coast Classic five days later.

His only victory of the season came at the 2.Pro rated Tour de Wallonie. Strong won Stage two of the tour in a mass bunch sprint moving him into the leaders jersey. He kept the leaders jersey for two more stages until the final stage where Matteo Trentin earned enough bonus seconds to pass Strong in the overall.

Strong competed in the individual road race at the 2024 Summer Olympics. He was New Zealand's best finisher placing 27 out of 90 who started the race.

The 2024 Vuelta a España was Strong's second Grand Tour of his career where he achieved five top-6s in stages placing third twice.

=== 2025 ===
In July, Strong won the five stage Tour de Wallonie. He won the opening stage. He said of the win: “I felt very fortunate to ride with this group, everyone was committed and believed in me. I enjoyed today a lot and it’s a great feeling to pay the guys back for their work today.” He came 10th in stage 2 and then fourth in stage 3 and second stage 4 and 5. He was only one second ahead at the beginning of stage five but his second place gave him a bonus six seconds to give him the victory.

Strong won the Arctic Race of Norway with Tom Pidcock taking second place. Strong won the opening stage and came second in the final stage for the victory. He said of the race: "I thought I could do maybe a top five, maybe a podium on GC, if I had a really good ride. I was quietly confident. Yesterday exceeded my expectations, So to be in the yellow and finish it off with my teammates today is a really nice feeling." Part of his prize included 50 kg of salmon from an event sponsor after winning the first stage.

=== 2026 ===
Strong came 5th in the Milan–San Remo. Strong expressed his satisfaction with the race, feeling good about his performance and praising the teamwork and support from his fellow riders. He mentioned how he has always believed this particular race suited him well. Despite facing a string of bad luck earlier in the year with crashes, mechanical issues, and illness in every competition, he found it rewarding to finish in the final group and secure a top-five position in a Monument, highlighting how significant this achievement is for him.

In June, Strong won the Circuit Franco-Belge. The 195 km race ended with an uphill finish and Strong won the sprint. He said of the victory: "It's a big relief. It hasn't been an easy start to the season. I think when I've been fit and healthy and had a good run at a race, I've been in good shape, but there have been very few opportunities, I think, for me - a lot of crashes and illness in the first part of the year - so to come here and get a win is a really nice feeling."

== Major results ==
=== Road ===
2018
3rd Lake Taupo Cycle Challenge
2019
1st Points classification, Tour de Ijen
4th Overall Tour de Kumano

1st Young rider classification

5th Overall Tour de Korea

1st Young rider classification

8th Overall Tour of Thailand
2020
Tour of Southland

1st Stages 2 & 4

3rd Overall New Zealand Cycle Classic

1st Young rider classification

2021
1st Overall New Zealand Cycle Classic

1st Young rider classification
1st Stage 1 (TTT)

5th Gravel and Tar Classic
9th Omloop van Valkenswaard
2022 (1 pro win)
2nd Coppa Bernocchi
5th Grand Prix de Wallonie
6th Overall Tour of Britain

1st Stage 1

7th Gran Piemonte
2023 (1)
1st Stage 1 Tour de Luxembourg
2nd Grand Prix Cycliste de Québec
3rd Circuit Franco-Belge
4th Giro del Veneto
5th Cadel Evans Great Ocean Road Race
7th GP Miguel Induráin
9th La Drôme Classic
2024 (2)
1st Giro del Veneto
2nd Road race, National Championships
2nd Overall Tour de Wallonie

1st Stage 2

2nd Gran Piemonte
2nd Tour du Finistère
3rd Surf Coast Classic
4th Cadel Evans Great Ocean Road Race
8th La Drôme Classic
10th Brabantse Pijl
2025 (4)
1st Overall Arctic Race of Norway

1st Points classification
1st Young rider classification
1st Stage 1

1st Overall Tour de Wallonie

1st Points classification
1st Stage 1

2nd Circuit Franco-Belge
4th Surf Coast Classic
6th Cadel Evans Great Ocean Road Race
9th Grand Prix Cycliste de Montréal
10th Grand Prix Cycliste de Québec
2026 (1)
1st Circuit Franco-Belge
3rd Overall Région Pays de la Loire Tour

1st Points classification

5th Milan–San Remo

==== Grand Tour general classification results timeline ====
| Grand Tour | 2023 | 2024 | 2025 | 2026 |
|---|---|---|---|---|
| Giro d'Italia | — | — | 96 | 88 |
| Tour de France | 90 | — | — | — |
| Vuelta a España | — | DNF | — | — |

==== Classics results timeline ====
| Monument | 2022 | 2023 | 2024 | 2025 | 2026 |
|---|---|---|---|---|---|
| Milan–San Remo | — | 86 | 17 | 12 | 5 |
| Tour of Flanders | — | — | 48 | 50 | |
| Paris–Roubaix | — | — | — | — | |
| Liège–Bastogne–Liège | — | — | — | — | — |
| Giro di Lombardia | 86 | — | — | — | — |
| Classic | 2022 | 2023 | 2024 | 2025 | 2026 |
| Great Ocean Road Race | — | 5 | 4 | 6 | 22 |
| Brabantse Pijl | — | 23 | 10 | 14 | |
| Grand Prix Cycliste de Québec | — | 2 | DNF | 10 | |
| Grand Prix Cycliste de Montréal | — | DNF | — | 9 | |
| Coppa Bernocchi | 2 | 27 | 19 | — | |
| Gran Piemonte | 7 | 65 | 2 | — | |

Legend
| — | Did not compete |
| DNF | Did not finish |
| IP | Race in Progress |

=== Track ===
2016
Oceania Junior Championships

2nd Omnium
2nd Team pursuit
3rd Scratch

2017
National Junior Championships

1st Omnium
1st Points race
1st Team sprint
2nd Individual pursuit
2nd Scratch

3rd Team pursuit, UCI World Junior Championships
3rd Madison, National Championships (with Josh Scott)
2018
1st Team pursuit, UCI World Junior Championships
Oceania Junior Championships

1st Individual pursuit
1st Omnium
1st Madison (with George Jackson)
3rd Points race

2019
1st Points race, Oceania Championships
National Championships

1st Points race
1st Team pursuit
2nd Scratch
2nd Madison (with Dylan Kennett)
3rd Omnium

UCI World Cup

2nd Team pursuit, Hong Kong
2nd Team pursuit, Brisbane
3rd Scratch, Hong Kong

2020
UCI World Championships

1st Points race
2nd Team pursuit

National Championships

1st Points race
1st Omnium

2021
National Championships

1st Team pursuit
2nd Points race
3rd Madison (with Tom Sexton)

UCI Champions League

1st Elimination, Palma
1st Scratch, Palma
2nd Scratch, London

2022
1st Scratch, Commonwealth Games
2nd Elimination, UCI World Championships
2023
2nd Madison, National Championships (with George Jackson)
