= Stan Dewulf =

Belgian cyclist

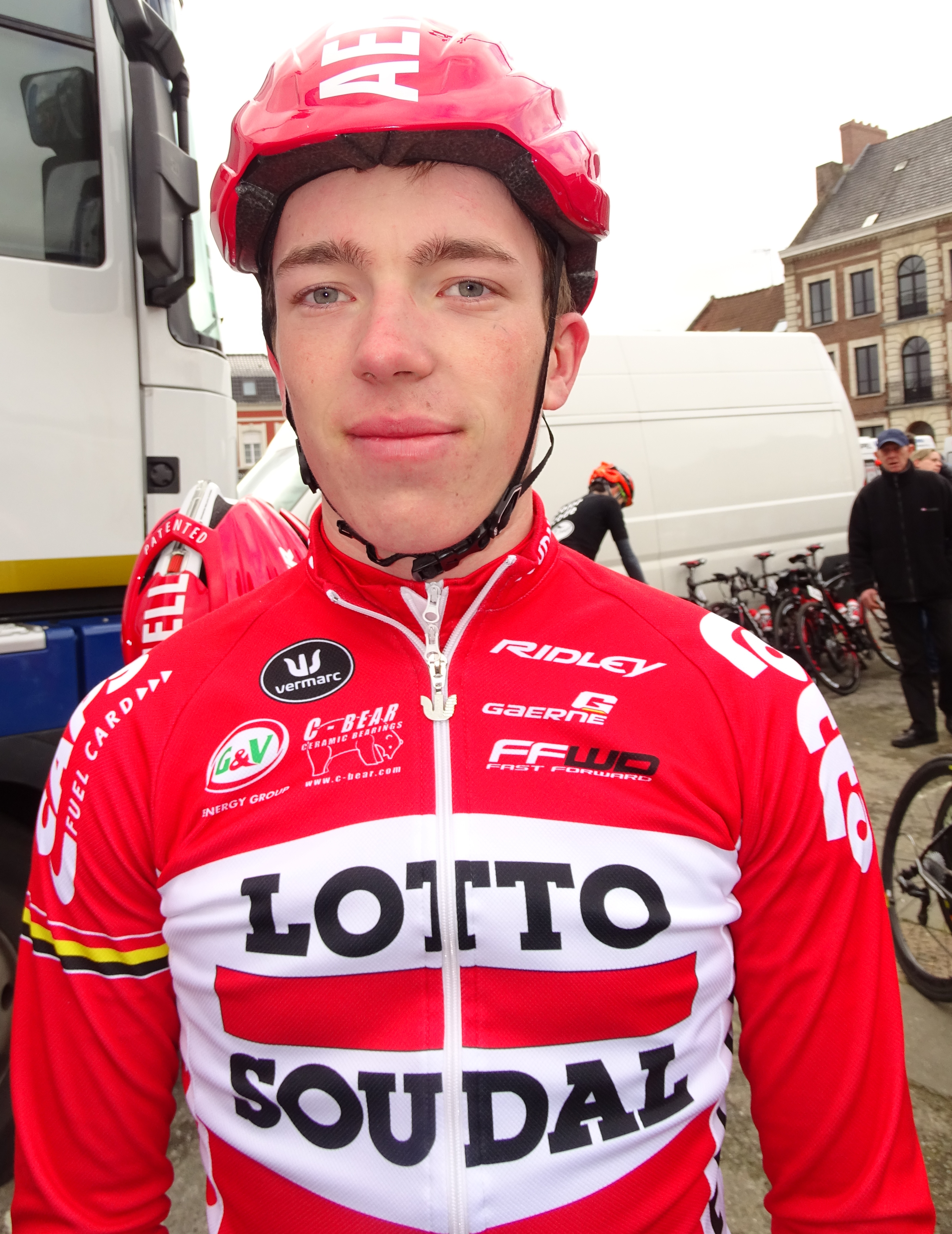
- Dewulf in 2016

Personal information
- Full name: Stan Dewulf
- Born: 20 December 1997 (age 28) Stavele, Belgium
- Height: 1.76 m (5 ft 9 in)
- Weight: 74 kg (163 lb)

Cycling career
- Sport: Cycling
- Current team: Decathlon CMA CGM Team
- Discipline: Road
- Role: Rider

Amateur teams
- 2016–2018: Lotto–Soudal U23
- 2018: Lotto–Soudal (stagiaire)

Professional teams
- 2019–2020: Lotto–Soudal
- 2021–: AG2R Citroën Team
Medal record
Representing Belgium
Men's road bicycle racing
European Championships
| Silver medal – second place | 2015 Tartu | Junior road race |

Stan Dewulf (born 20 December 1997) is a Belgian cyclist, who currently rides for UCI WorldTeam Decathlon CMA CGM Team. Professional since 2019, he has most notably won the 2021 Boucles de l'Aulne.

== Major results ==
2014
1st Overall Keizer der Juniores
2015
2nd Road race, UEC European Junior Road Championships
3rd Paris–Roubaix Juniors
3rd Grote Prijs André Noyelle
4th Menen–Kemmel–Menen
2016
8th Dwars door de Vlaamse Ardennen
8th Overall Olympia's Tour
2017
3rd Road race, National Under-23 Road Championships
3rd Overall Tour de Bretagne
3rd Overall Olympia's Tour
4th Overall Le Triptyque des Monts et Châteaux
5th Grand Prix Criquielion
9th Omloop Het Nieuwsblad Beloften
2018
1st Paris–Roubaix Espoirs
2nd Overall Le Triptyque des Monts et Châteaux

1st Stages 3a (ITT) & 3b

2nd Overall Tour de Bretagne

1st Young rider classification

3rd Okolo Jižních Čech

1st Young rider classification
1st Stage 1 (TTT)

3rd Ringerike GP
6th Liège–Bastogne–Liège U23
6th Gylne Gutuer
9th Overall Paris–Arras Tour
2020
2nd Antwerp Port Epic
Combativity award Stage 8 Vuelta a España
2021 (1 pro win)
1st Boucles de l'Aulne
2nd Overall Tour de Wallonie
4th Paris–Tours
5th Binche–Chimay–Binche
2022
4th Le Samyn
9th Tro-Bro Léon
2024
4th Overall Tour de Wallonie
5th Overall Renewi Tour
2026
4th Overall Four Days of Dunkirk
4th E3 Saxo Classic

=== Grand Tour general classification results timeline ===
| Grand Tour | 2020 | 2021 | 2022 | 2023 |
|---|---|---|---|---|
| Giro d'Italia | — | — | — | — |
| Tour de France | — | — | 65 | 81 |
| Vuelta a España | 70 | 65 | — | — |

Legend
| — | Did not compete |
| DNF | Did not finish |
