= List of protected heritage sites in Ouffet =

This table shows an overview of the protected heritage sites in the Walloon town Ouffet. This list is part of Belgium's national heritage.

Object	Year/architect	Town/section	Address	Coordinates	Number^{?}	Image
Keep, old court (facades and roofs) ^{(nl)} ^{(fr)}		Ouffet	rue du Perron	50.437013°N 5.466717°E	61048-CLT-0002-01 Info	Donjon, oude rechtbank (gevels en daken) en omgeving
Keep of Lizin ^{(nl)} ^{(fr)}		Ouffet		50.456916°N 5.461909°E	61048-CLT-0003-01 Info	Donjon van Lizin
"Pierre au sacrament" and "Chemin de Messe" ^{(nl)} ^{(fr)}		Ouffet		50.444276°N 5.402622°E	61048-CLT-0004-01 Info	

== See also ==
- List of protected heritage sites in Liège (province)
