= Kim Heiduk =

German cyclist (born 2000)

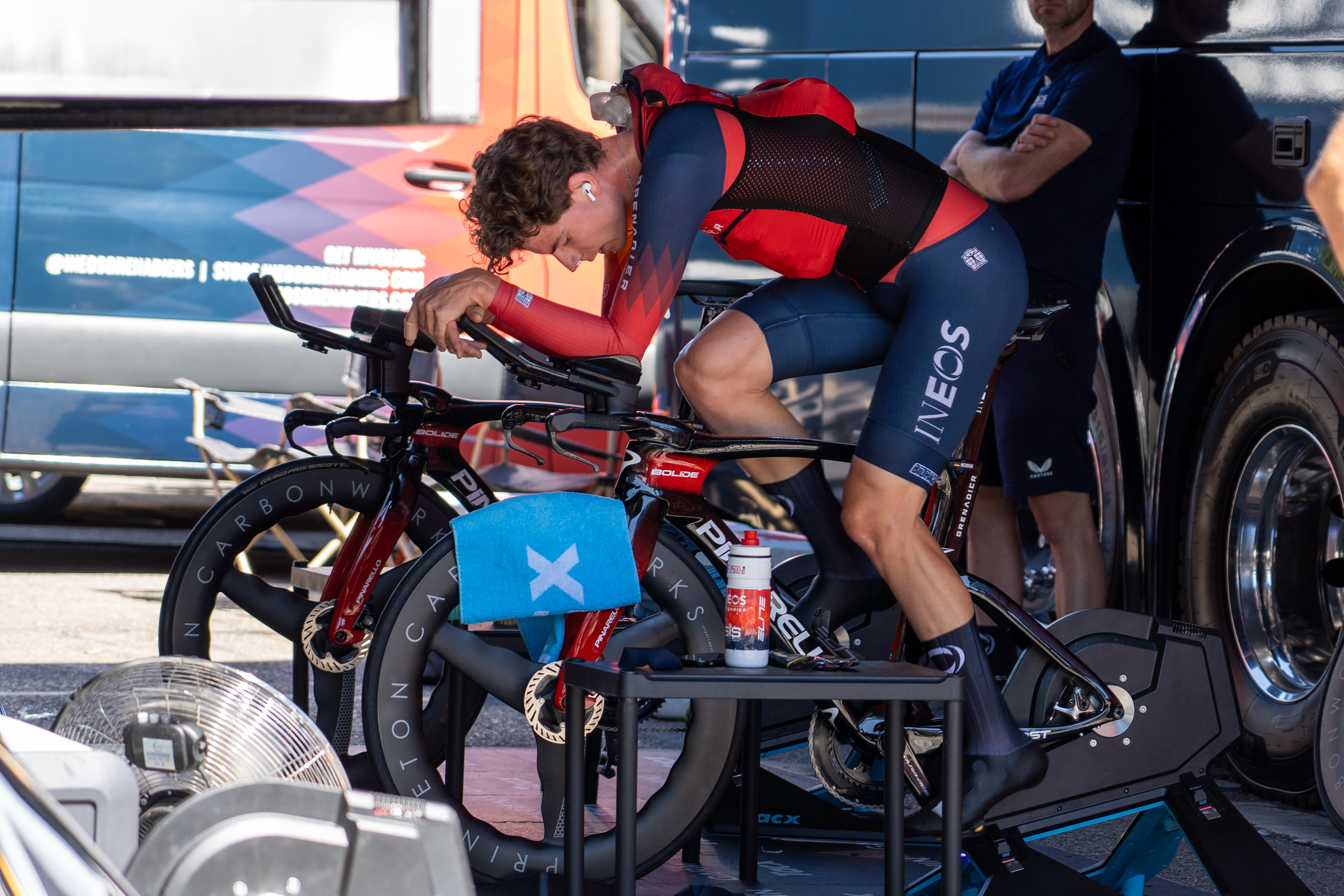
- Heiduk at the 2023 Vuelta a España

Personal information
- Full name: Kim Alexander Heiduk
- Born: 3 March 2000 (age 26) Herrenberg, Germany
- Height: 1.84 m (6 ft 0 in)
- Weight: 70 kg (154 lb)

Cycling career
- Sport: Cycling
- Current team: Netcompany–Ineos
- Discipline: Road
- Role: Rider

Professional teams
- 2019–2021: Team Lotto–Kern Haus
- 2022–: INEOS Grenadiers

Kim Heiduk (born 3 March 2000) is a German cyclist, who currently rides for UCI WorldTeam INEOS Grenadiers.

== Major results ==
2017
3rd Road race, National Junior Road Championships
2018
3rd Overall Ain Bugey Valromey Tour
5th Road race, National Junior Road Championships
6th Eschborn–Frankfurt Juniors
2021
1st Road race, National Under-23 Road Championships
2nd Overall Tour d'Eure-et-Loir

1st Stage 1

2nd Overall Orlen Nations Grand Prix
2nd Gippinger Radsporttage
4th Ster van Zwolle
4th Overall International Tour of Rhodes
2023
7th Per sempre Alfredo
7th Schwalbe Classic
10th Brabantse Pijl
2024
3rd Road race, National Road Championships
2025
8th Overall Tour de Wallonie
2026
6th Overall Four Days of Dunkirk
6th Overall Tour de Wallonie
7th Classique Dunkerque

=== Grand Tour general classification results timeline ===
Grand Tour	2023
Giro d'Italia	—
Tour de France	—
Vuelta a España	139

Legend
—	Did not compete
DNF	Did not finish
