= Sam Maisonobe =

French cyclist

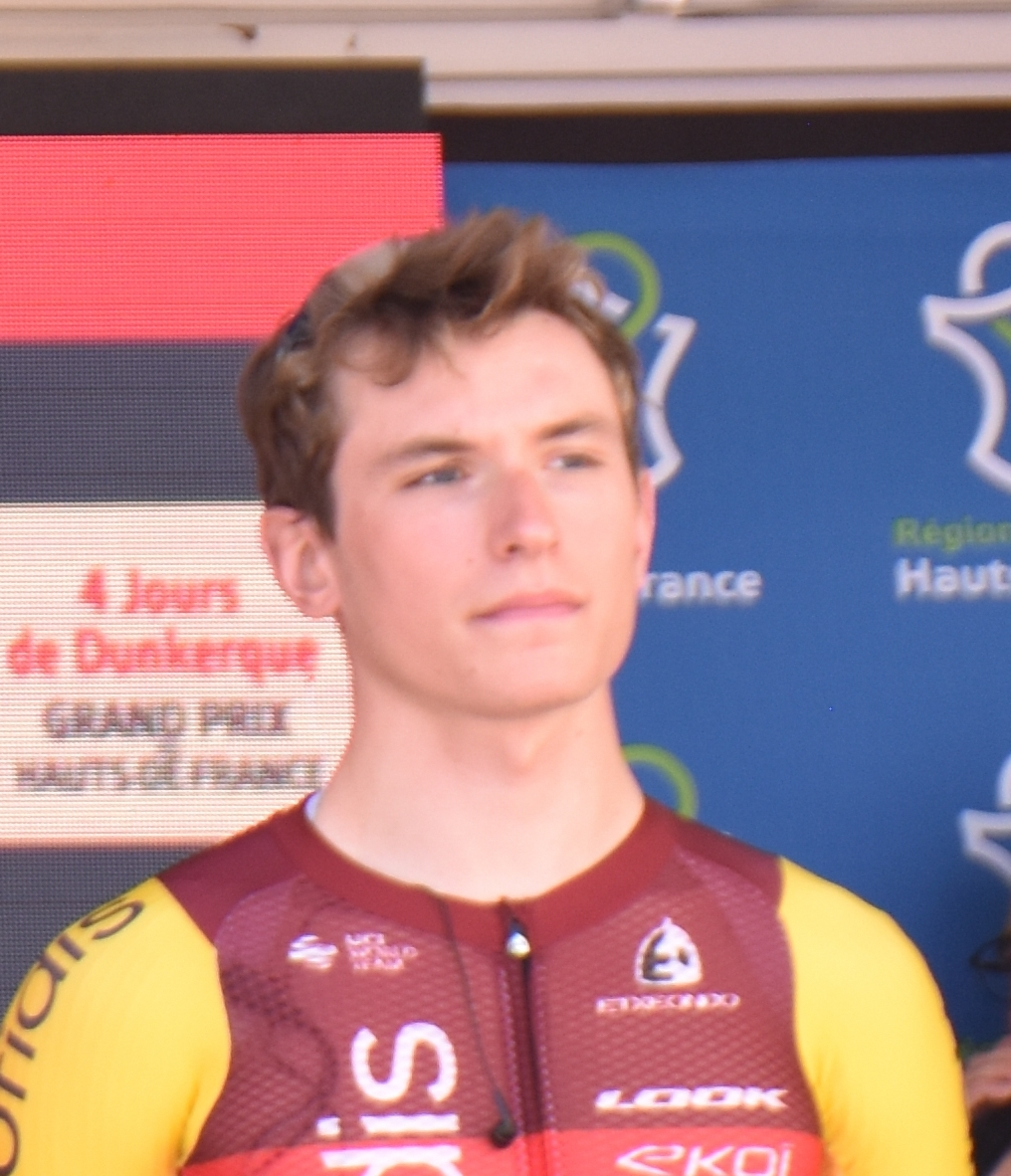
- Maisonobe in 2025

Personal information
- Born: 8 September 2003 (age 23) Toulouse, France

Cycling career
- Sport: Cycling
- Current team: Cofidis
- Discipline: Road
- Role: Rider

Amateur teams
- 2020: US Maule
- 2024: Vendée U Pays de la Loire

Professional team
- 2025–: Cofidis

Sam Maisonobe (born 8 September 2003) is a French professional racing cyclist, who currently rides for UCI WorldTeam Cofidis.

== Major results ==
2024
1st Stage 3 Ronde de l'Isard
1st Stage 3 (TTT) Circuit des Plages Vendéennes
2nd Overall Overall Vuelta a la Comunidad de Madrid Sub-23

1st Stage 5

2nd Overall Circuit du Mené
3rd Overall Tour de Guadeloupe

1st Young rider classification
1st Stages 2 & 8

3rd Tour du Jura
3rd Boucles de l'Essor
3rd La SportBreizh Élites
5th Road race, National Under-23 Road Championships
5th Bol d'Or des Amateurs
7th Paris-Chalette-Vierzon
7th Manche-Atlantique
2025
8th Japan Cup
9th Overall Tour du Limousin
2026
5th Coppa Agostoni
7th Japan Cup
8th Overall Four Days of Dunkirk
