= Victor Papon =

French cyclist

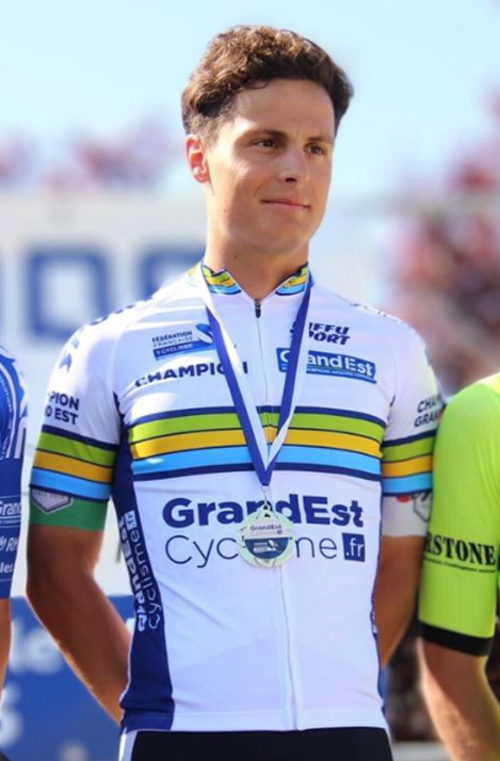
- Papon in 2023

Personal information
- Born: 25 January 2001 (age 25) Langres, France
- Height: 1.75 m (5 ft 9 in)
- Weight: 67 kg (148 lb)

Cycling career
- Sport: Cycling
- Current team: Nice Métropole Côte d'Azur
- Disciplines: Road; Gravel
- Role: Rider
- Rider type: Puncheur

Amateur teams
- 2021: VC Toucy
- 2022–2023: UV Aube
- 2024: Paris Cycliste Olympique

Professional teams
- 2025: Wagner Bazin WB
- 2026–: Nice Métropole Côte d'Azur

Victor Papon (born 25 January 2001) is a French professional racing cyclist, who currently rides for UCI Continental team Nice Métropole Côte d'Azur.

Papon turned professional in 2025 with UCI ProTeam Wagner Bazin WB, before moving to Nice Métropole Côte d'Azur in 2026 after the former team folded. In May 2026, he took his first pro win on stage two of the Four Days of Dunkirk, via a small breakaway. He also went on to win the mountains classification.

== Major results ==
2025
3rd National Gravel Championships
2026 (1 pro win)
Four Days of Dunkirk

1st Mountains classification
1st Stage 2

1st Mountains classification, Étoile de Bessèges
5th Overall Istrian Spring Tour
