= 2022 Primus Classic =

2022 UCI Europe Tour 2022 UCI ProSeries
- Event poster with former winners, previous winner Florian Sénéchal centered

Race details
- Dates: 17 September 2022
- Stages: 1
- Distance: 199.3 km (123.8 mi)
- Winning time: 4h 43' 32"

Results
	Winner	Jordi Meeus (BEL)	(Bora–Hansgrohe)
	Second	Arnaud Démare (FRA)	(Groupama–FDJ)
	Third	Max Kanter (GER)	(Movistar Team)

The 2022 Primus Classic (also known as the Grand Prix Impanis-Van Petegem) was the 24th edition of the Primus Classic road cycling one day race, which was held on 17 September 2022 as part of the 2022 UCI ProSeries calendar.

== Teams ==
13 of the 19 UCI WorldTeams, six UCI ProTeams, and three UCI Continental teams made up the 22 teams that participated in the race.

UCI WorldTeams

- AG2R Citroën Team
- Bora–Hansgrohe
- Cofidis
- EF Education–EasyPost
- Groupama–FDJ
- Intermarché–Wanty–Gobert Matériaux
- Israel–Premier Tech
- Lotto–Soudal
- Movistar Team
- Quick-Step Alpha Vinyl Team
- Team BikeExchange–Jayco
- Team DSM
- Trek–Segafredo

UCI ProTeams

- Alpecin–Deceuninck
- B&B Hotels–KTM
- Bingoal Pauwels Sauces WB
- Sport Vlaanderen–Baloise
- Team TotalEnergies
- Uno-X Pro Cycling Team

UCI Continental Teams

- Abloc CT
- Minerva Cycling Team
- Tarteletto–Isorex

== Result ==
Result
Rank	Rider	Team	Time
1	Jordi Meeus (BEL)	Bora–Hansgrohe	4h 43' 32"
2	Arnaud Démare (FRA)	Groupama–FDJ	+ 0"
3	Max Kanter (GER)	Movistar Team	+ 0"
4	Kenneth Van Rooy (BEL)	Sport Vlaanderen–Baloise	+ 0"
5	Guillaume Boivin (CAN)	Israel–Premier Tech	+ 0"
6	Anthony Turgis (FRA)	Team TotalEnergies	+ 0"
7	Simone Consonni (ITA)	Cofidis	+ 0"
8	Oliver Naesen (BEL)	AG2R Citroën Team	+ 0"
9	Dries De Bondt (BEL)	Alpecin–Deceuninck	+ 0"
10	Pierre Gautherat (FRA)	AG2R Citroën Team	+ 0"
