= 2024 Cadel Evans Great Ocean Road Race =

Cycling race

2024 UCI World Tour, race 2 of 35

Race details
- Dates: 28 January 2024
- Stages: 1
- Distance: 176 km (109 mi)
- Winning time: 4h 17' 40"

Results
	Winner	Laurence Pithie (NZL)	(Groupama–FDJ)
	Second	Natnael Tesfatsion (ERI)	(Lidl–Trek)
	Third	Georg Zimmermann (GER)	(Intermarché–Wanty)

The 2024 Cadel Evans Great Ocean Road Race was a road cycling race that was held on 28 January in Geelong, Australia. It was the eighth edition of the Cadel Evans Great Ocean Road Race and the second event of the 2024 UCI World Tour.

== Teams ==
Thirteen teams entered the race, including ten of the eighteen UCI WorldTeams, one UCI ProTeam, and two UCI Continental teams.

UCI WorldTeams

- Arkéa–B&B Hotels
- Astana Qazaqstan Team
- Cofidis
- EF Education–EasyPost
- Groupama–FDJ
- INEOS Grenadiers
- Intermarché–Wanty
- Lidl–Trek
- Team dsm–firmenich PostNL
- Team Jayco–AlUla

UCI ProTeams

- Israel–Premier Tech

UCI Continental Teams

- ARA Skip Capital
- Team BridgeLane

== Result ==
Result
Rank	Rider	Team	Time
1	Laurence Pithie (NZL)	Groupama–FDJ	4h 17' 40"
2	Natnael Tesfatsion (ERI)	Lidl–Trek	+ 0"
3	Georg Zimmermann (GER)	Intermarché–Wanty	+ 0"
4	Corbin Strong (NZL)	Israel–Premier Tech	+ 0"
5	Jhonatan Narváez (ECU)	INEOS Grenadiers	+ 0"
6	Axel Mariault (FRA)	Cofidis	+ 0"
7	Chris Hamilton (AUS)	Team dsm–firmenich PostNL	+ 0"
8	Christian Scaroni (ITA)	Astana Qazaqstan Team	+ 0"
9	Jonas Rutsch (GER)	EF Education–EasyPost	+ 0"
10	Louis Barré (FRA)	Arkéa–B&B Hotels	+ 0"
