= Ouffet =

Municipality in Liège Province, Wallonia, Belgium

Ouffet Oufet (Walloon)
- Municipality
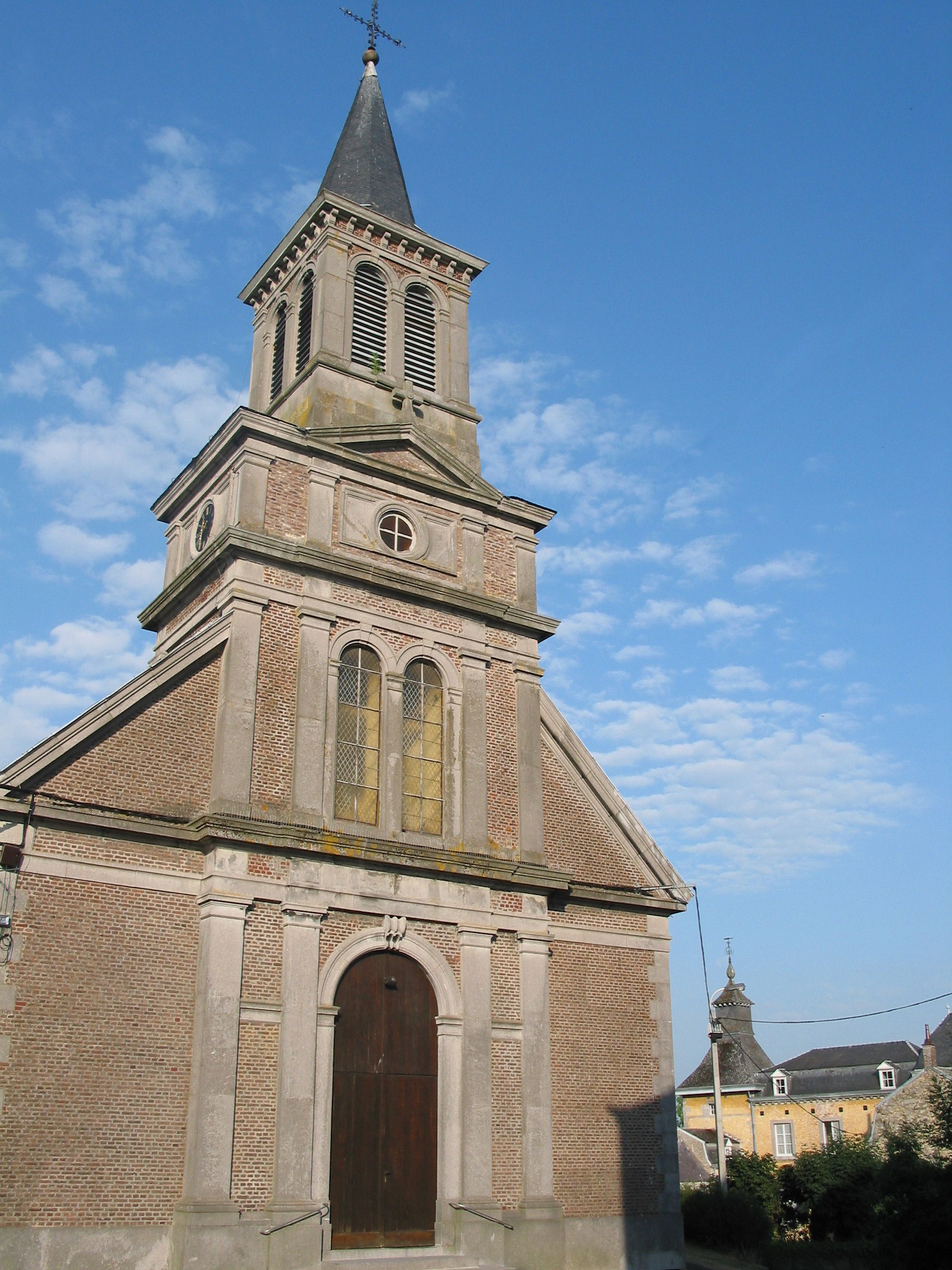

- Location of Ouffet in the province of Liège
- Interactive map of Ouffet
- Location in Belgium
- Coordinates: 50°26′N 05°28′E
- Country: Belgium
- Community: French Community
- Region: Wallonia
- Province: Liège
- Arrondissement: Huy

Government
  - Mayor: Caroline Mailleux (MR)
  - Governing party: Entente Communale

Area
  - Total: 40.24 km^{2} (15.54 sq mi)

Population (2018-01-01)
  - Total: 2,802
  - Density: 69.63/km^{2} (180.3/sq mi)
- Postal codes: 4590
- NIS code: 61048
- Area codes: 086
- Website: www.ouffet.be

Ouffet (French pronunciation: [ufɛ]; Walloon: Oufet) is a municipality of Wallonia located in the province of liège, Belgium.

On January 1, 2006, Ouffet had a total population of 2,529. The total area is 40.22 km^{2} which gives a population density of 63 inhabitants per km^{2}.

The municipality consists of the following districts: Ellemelle, Ouffet, and Warzée.

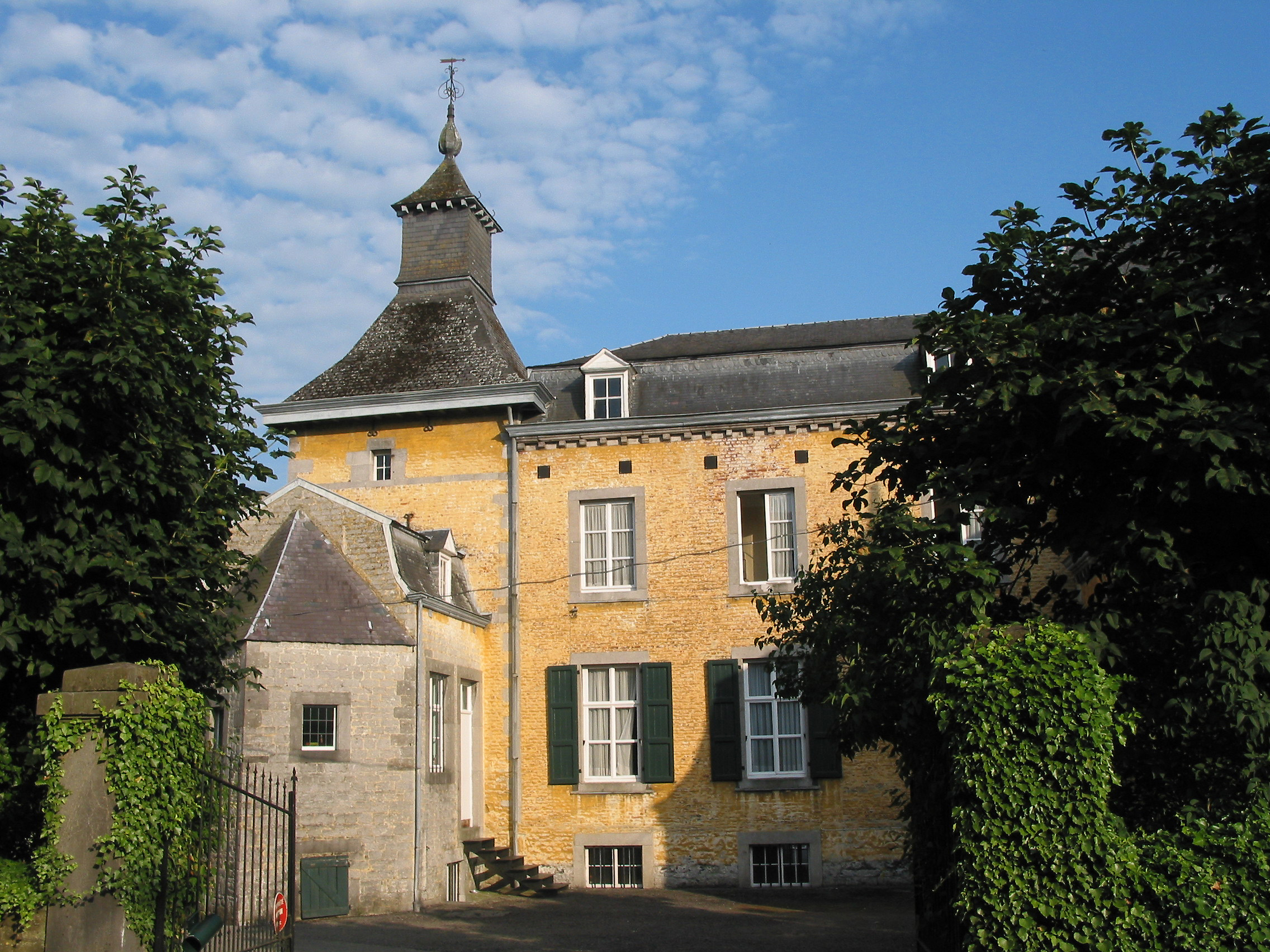
The castle (18th century)

== See also ==
- List of protected heritage sites in Ouffet
