= Natnael Tesfatsion =

Eritrean cyclist

- Tesfatsion in 2026

Personal information
- Full name: Natnael Tesfatsion Ocbit
- Born: 23 May 1999 (age 27) Asmara, Eritrea
- Height: 1.75 m (5 ft 9 in)
- Weight: 60 kg (132 lb)

Cycling career
- Sport: Cycling
- Current team: Movistar Team
- Discipline: Road
- Role: Rider

Amateur team
- 2018: EriTel

Professional teams
- 2019–2020: Dimension Data for Qhubeka
- 2021–2022: Androni Giocattoli–Sidermec
- 2023–2024: Trek–Segafredo
- 2025–: Movistar Team

Major wins
- One-day races and Classics National Road Race Championships (2024)

Natnael Tesfatsion Ocbit (born 23 May 1999) is an Eritrean cyclist, who currently rides for UCI WorldTeam Movistar Team.

== Major results ==
Tesfatsion finishing 2026 Memorial Marco Pantani

2019
2nd Road race, National Road Championships
4th Gran Premio Sportivi di Poggiana
5th Overall Tour de l'Espoir

1st Points classification
1st Stage 1 (TTT)

6th Ruota d'Oro
2020 (3 pro wins)
1st Overall Tour du Rwanda

1st Young rider classification
1st African rider classification
1st Stage 4

2nd Overall La Tropicale Amissa Bongo

1st Young rider classification
1st Stage 2

2021
4th Tour du Doubs
9th Per sempre Alfredo
2022 (2)
1st Overall Tour du Rwanda

1st Young rider classification
1st African rider classification

2nd Road race, National Road Championships
2nd Overall Adriatica Ionica Race

1st Mountains classification
1st Stage 2

2nd Giro dell'Appennino
4th GP Industria & Artigianato
7th Overall Tour of Romania
9th Overall Settimana Internazionale di Coppi e Bartali
2023
4th GP Industria & Artigianato di Larciano
5th Figueira Champions Classic
2024 (1)
1st Road race, National Road Championships
2nd Cadel Evans Great Ocean Road Race
2nd Down Under Classic
7th Gran Piemonte
8th Overall Tour de Wallonie
2025
3rd Road race, National Road Championships
3rd Memorial Marco Pantani
5th Surf Coast Classic
6th Overall Tour de Wallonie
8th Grand Prix de Wallonie
2026 (2)
1st Circuito de Getxo
2nd Overall Four Days of Dunkirk

1st Stage 4

4th Trofeo Matteotti
5th Cadel Evans Great Ocean Road Race
6th Overall Deutschland Tour
7th Eschborn–Frankfurt
10th Muscat Classic

=== Grand Tour general classification results timeline ===
Grand Tour	2021	2022	2023
Giro d'Italia	92	DNF	DNF
Tour de France	—	—	—
Vuelta a España	—	—	—

Legend
—	Did not compete
DNF	Did not finish
