= Carlos Canal =

Spanish cyclist (born 2001)

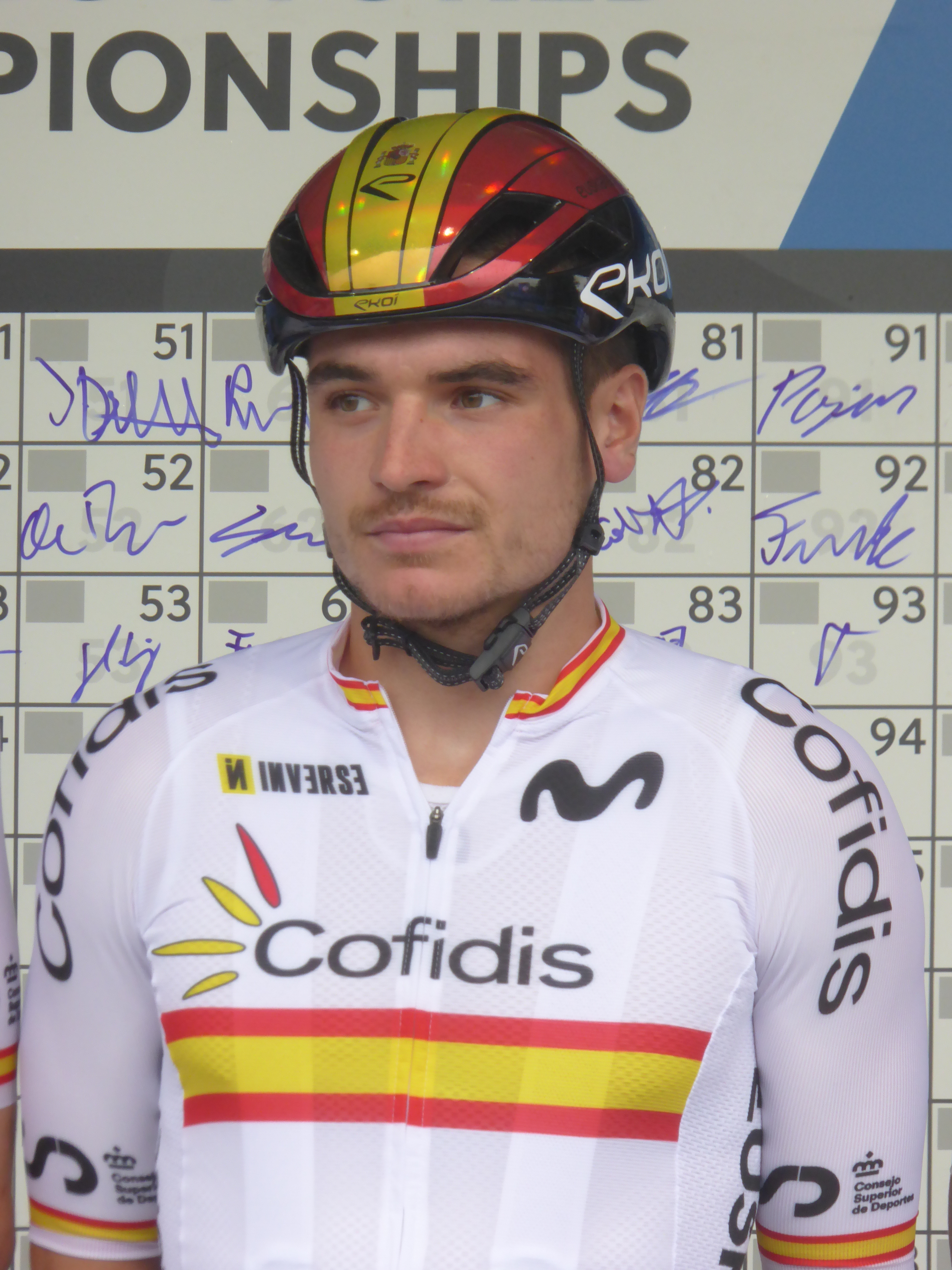
- Canal in 2023

Personal information
- Full name: Carlos Canal Blanco
- Born: 28 June 2001 (age 25) Xinzo de Limia, Spain
- Height: 1.79 m (5 ft 10 in)
- Weight: 70 kg (154 lb)

Cycling career
- Sport: Cycling
- Current team: Movistar Team
- Disciplines: Road; Cyclo-cross; Mountain biking
- Role: Rider

Professional teams
- 2020–2021: Burgos BH
- 2022–2023: Euskaltel–Euskadi
- 2024–: Movistar Team

Carlos Canal Blanco (born 28 June 2001 in Xinzo de Limia) is a Spanish cyclist, who currently rides for UCI WorldTeam Movistar Team.

== Major results ==
=== Cyclo-cross ===
2017–2018
1st National Junior Championships
2018–2019
1st National Junior Championships

=== Mountain bike ===
2018
2nd Cross-country, National Junior Championships
2019
1st Cross-country, National Junior Championships

=== Road ===
2021
7th Vuelta a Murcia
2022
1st Mountains classification, Tour de Bretagne
2023
6th Trofeo Calvia
7th Trofeo Ses Salines–Alcúdia
2024
4th Road race, National Road Championships
6th Clàssica Comunitat Valenciana 1969
7th Overall Tour de Wallonie
8th Clásica Jaén Paraíso Interior
2025
2nd Coppa Agostoni
3rd Overall Four Days of Dunkirk
4th Overall Tour de Wallonie
8th Clásica Jaén Paraíso Interior
8th Surf Coast Classic
2026 (1 pro win)
1st Stage 2 O Gran Camiño
6th Overall Tour of Belgium
8th Overall Tour de Wallonie

=== Grand Tour general classification results timeline ===
Grand Tour	2021	2022
Giro d'Italia	—	—
Tour de France	—	—
Vuelta a España	106	84

Legend
—	Did not compete
DNF	Did not finish
