= Lagny-le-Sec =

- Commune
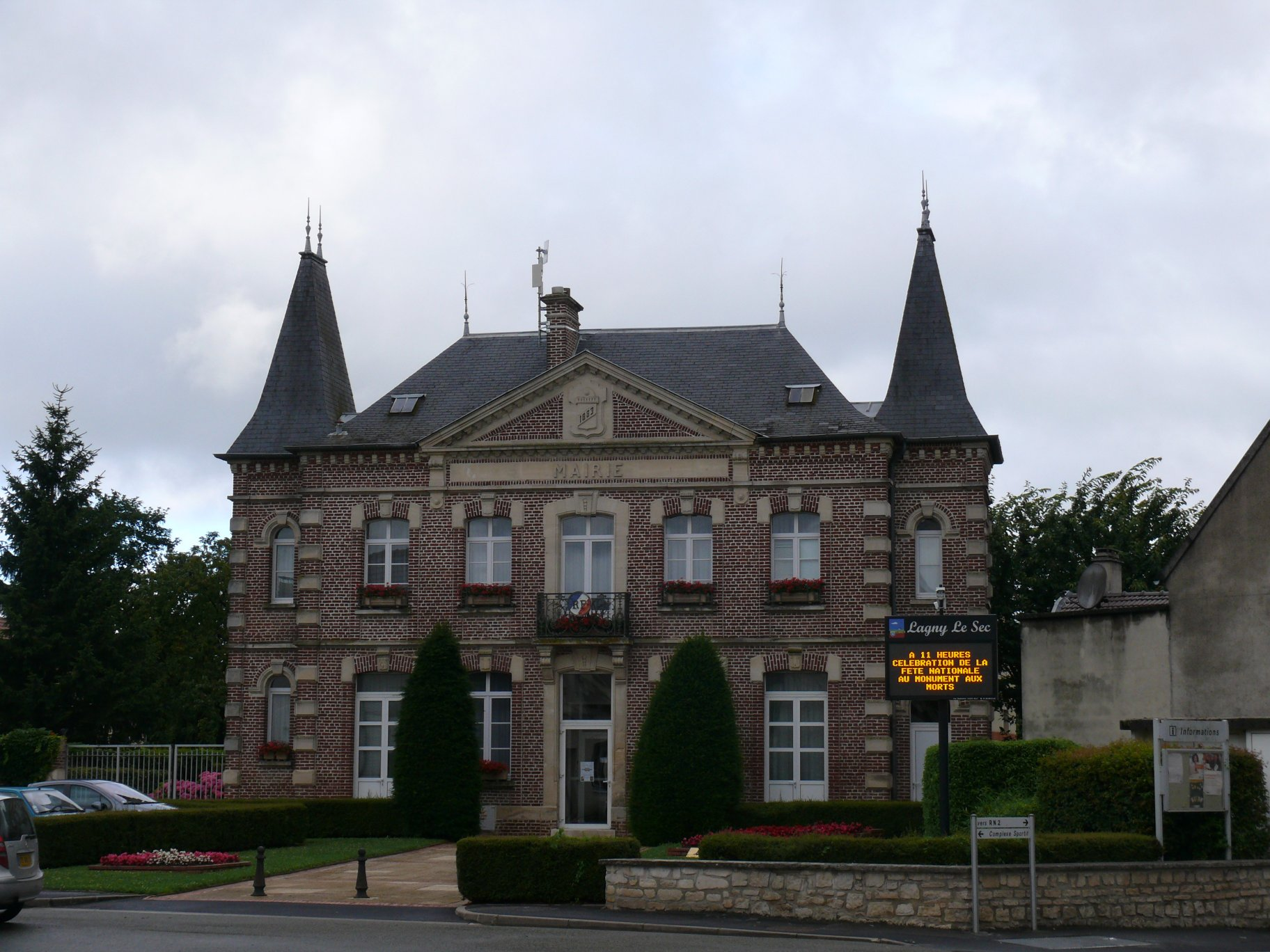
- The town hall in Lagny-le-Sec
- Location of Lagny-le-Sec
- Location within France Location within Hauts-de-France
- Coordinates: 49°05′15″N 2°44′42″E
- Country: France
- Region: Hauts-de-France
- Department: Oise
- Arrondissement: Senlis
- Canton: Nanteuil-le-Haudouin
- Intercommunality: Pays de Valois

Government
  - Mayor (2020–2026): Didier Doucet
- Area^{1}: 11.23 km^{2} (4.34 sq mi)
- Elevation: 107 m (351 ft)
- Highest elevation: 116 m (381 ft)
- Lowest elevation: 94 m (308 ft)
- Population (2023): 2,043
  - Density: 181.9/km^{2} (471.2/sq mi)
- Time zone: UTC+01:00 (CET)
  - Summer (DST): UTC+02:00 (CEST)
- INSEE/Postal code: 60341 /60330
- ^{1} French Land Register data, which excludes lakes, ponds, glaciers > 1 km^{2} (0.386 sq mi or 247 acres) and river estuaries.

Lagny-le-Sec (French pronunciation: [laɲi lə sɛk]) is a commune in the Oise department in northern France.

== Population ==
Historical population
Year	Pop.	±% p.a.
1968	623	—
1975	1,167	+9.38%
1982	1,619	+4.79%
1990	1,892	+1.97%
1999	1,806	−0.52%
2007	1,816	+0.07%
2012	2,026	+2.21%
2017	2,062	+0.35%
2023	2,043	−0.15%
Source: INSEE

== See also ==
- Communes of the Oise department
