= Liam Slock =

Belgian cyclist (born 2000)

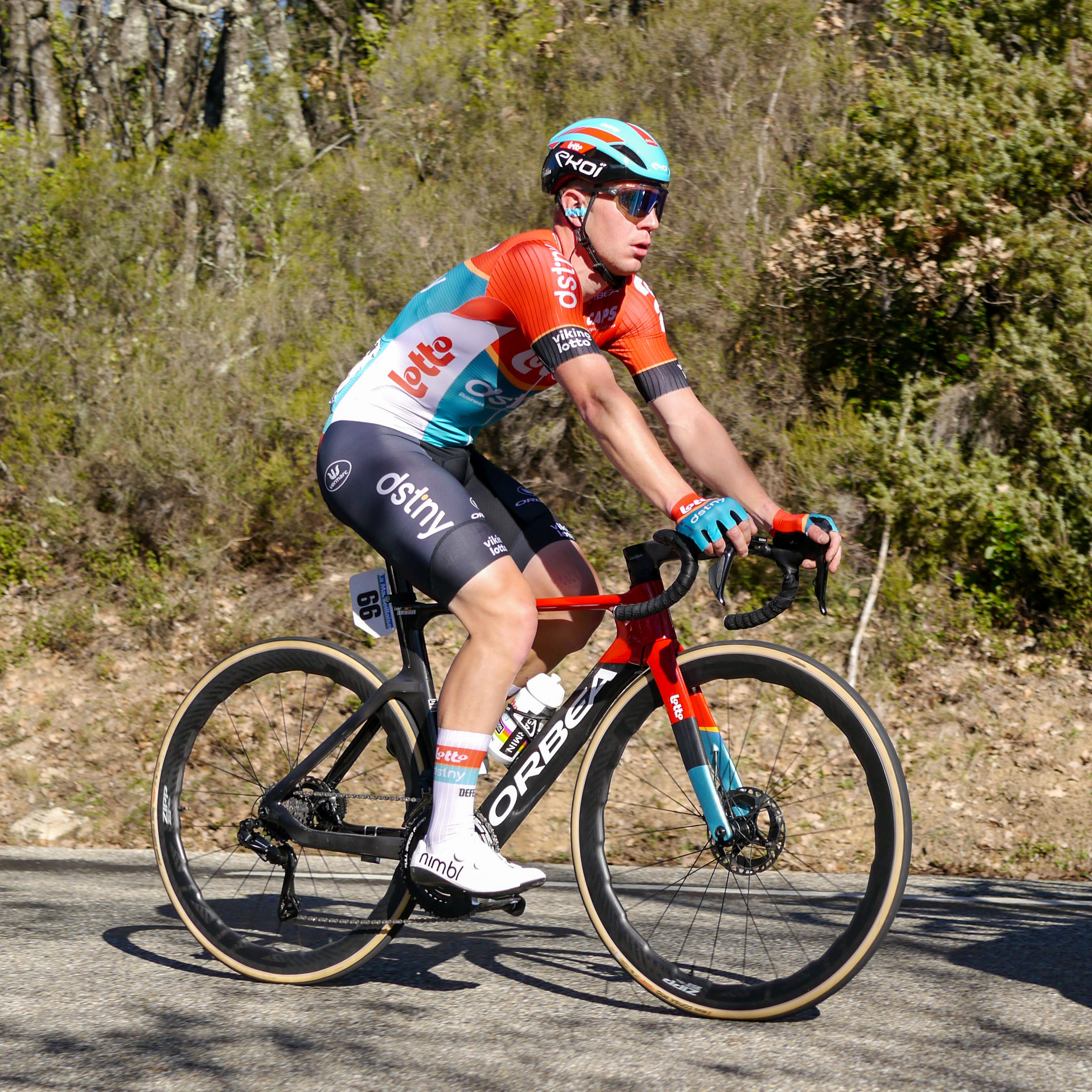
- Liam Slock, Etoile de Bessèges 2024

Personal information
- Born: 18 September 2000 (age 26) Ghent, Belgium
- Height: 1.88 m (6 ft 2 in)
- Weight: 78 kg (172 lb)

Cycling career
- Sport: Cycling
- Current team: Lotto–Intermarché
- Discipline: Road
- Role: Rider
- Rider type: Time trialist

Amateur teams
- 2017–2018: Van Moer Logistics
- 2019–2020: GM Recycling Team
- 2021–2022: Lotto–Soudal U23

Professional team
- 2023–: Lotto–Dstny

Liam Slock (born 18 September 2000) is a Belgian cyclist, who currently rides for UCI WorldTeam Lotto–Intermarché. Slock scored his first major victory at the 2026 GP Gippingen, where a gust of wind caused him to crash while celebrating on the approach to the finish line.

Liam was named after the actor Liam Neeson of whom his mother was a big fan.

== Major results ==
2022
1st GP Color Code Bassenge
1st Mountains classification, Tour de Normandie
2nd Overall Triptyque Ardennais

1st Stage 1

6th Memorial Philippe Van Coningsloo
9th Overall Circuit des Ardennes

1st Mountains classification

2023
2nd Overall Olympia's Tour
7th Dorpenomloop Rucphen
2024
4th Polynormande
6th Overall Tour of Istanbul
8th Druivenkoers Overijse
2025
Combativity award Stage 2 Vuelta a España
2026 (1 pro win)
1st GP Gippingen
5th Overall Four Days of Dunkirk
Combativity award Stage 8 Tour de France

=== Grand Tour general classification results timeline ===
Grand Tour	2025
Giro d'Italia	—
Tour de France	—
Vuelta a España	134

Legend
—	Did not compete
DNF	Did not finish
