= 2020 AG2R La Mondiale season =

Cycling team season

AG2R La Mondiale
- 2020 season
- UCI code: ALM
- Status: UCI WorldTeam
- Manager: Vincent Lavenu
- Main sponsor(s): AG2R Group & La Mondiale Group
- Based: France
- Bicycles: Eddy Merckx
- Groupset: Shimano

Season victories
- One-day races: 2
- Stage race overall: 1
- Stage race stages: 2
- National Championships: 1
- Most wins: Benoît Cosnefroy (3)
- Jersey

The 2020 season for the AG2R La Mondiale cycling team will begin in January at the Tour Down Under.

== Team roster ==
As of 1 January 2020.

Rider	Date of birth
Romain Bardet (FRA)	9 November 1990 (aged 29)
François Bidard (FRA)	12 March 1992 (aged 27)
Geoffrey Bouchard (FRA)	1 April 1992 (aged 27)
Clément Champoussin (Note: Champoussin will join the team from April 2020.) (FRA)	29 May 1998 (aged 21)
Mikaël Cherel (FRA)	17 March 1986 (aged 33)
Clément Chevrier (FRA)	29 January 1992 (aged 27)
Benoît Cosnefroy (FRA)	17 October 1995 (aged 24)
Silvan Dillier (SUI)	3 August 1990 (aged 29)
Axel Domont (FRA)	7 August 1990 (aged 29)
Julien Duval (FRA)	27 May 1990 (aged 29)
Mathias Frank (SUI)	9 December 1986 (aged 33)
Tony Gallopin (FRA)	24 May 1988 (aged 31)
Ben Gastauer (LUX)	14 November 1987 (aged 32)
Alexandre Geniez (FRA)	16 April 1988 (aged 31)
Dorian Godon (FRA)	25 May 1996 (aged 23)

Rider	Date of birth
Alexis Gougeard (FRA)	5 March 1993 (aged 26)
Jaakko Hänninen (FIN)	16 April 1997 (age 29)
Quentin Jaurégui (FRA)	22 April 1994 (aged 25)
Pierre Latour (FRA)	12 October 1993 (aged 26)
Lawrence Naesen (BEL)	28 August 1992 (aged 27)
Oliver Naesen (BEL)	16 September 1990 (aged 29)
Aurélien Paret-Peintre (FRA)	27 February 1996 (aged 23)
Nans Peters (FRA)	12 March 1994 (aged 25)
Harry Tanfield (GBR)	17 November 1994 (aged 25)
Stijn Vandenbergh (BEL)	25 April 1984 (aged 35)
Andrea Vendrame (ITA)	20 July 1994 (aged 25)
Clément Venturini (FRA)	16 October 1993 (aged 26)
Alexis Vuillermoz (FRA)	1 January 1988 (aged 32)
Larry Warbasse (USA)	28 January 1990 (aged 29)

Riders who joined the team for the 2020 season

Rider	2019 team
Clément Champoussin	neo-pro (Chambéry CF)
Lawrence Naesen	Lotto–Soudal
Harry Tanfield	Team Katusha–Alpecin
Andrea Vendrame	Androni Giocattoli–Sidermec

Riders who left the team during or after the 2019 season

Rider	2020 team
Gediminas Bagdonas	Klaipėda
Nico Denz	Team Sunweb
Samuel Dumoulin	Retired
Hubert Dupont	Retired

== Season victories ==
Date	Race	Competition	Rider	Country	Location
2 February	Grand Prix La Marseillaise	UCI Europe Tour	Benoît Cosnefroy (FRA)	France	Marseille
9 February	Étoile de Bessèges, Overall	UCI Europe Tour	Benoît Cosnefroy (FRA)	France	
4 August	Route d'Occitanie, Stage 4	UCI Europe Tour	Benoît Cosnefroy (FRA)	France	Rocamadour
19 August	Tour de Wallonie, Team classification	UCI Europe Tour; UCI ProSeries	(Note: The riders on the squad were Silvan Dillier, Julien Duval, Lawrence Naesen, Oliver Naesen, Stijn Vandenbergh, Andrea Vendrame, and Clément Venturini.)	Belgium	
5 September	Tour de France, Stage 8	UCI World Tour	Nans Peters (FRA)	France	Loudenvielle
19 September	Tour de Luxembourg, Team classification	UCI Europe Tour; UCI ProSeries	(Note: The riders on the squad were François Bidard, Clément Champoussin, Tony Gallopin, Ben Gastauer, Lawrence Naesen, and Aurélien Paret-Peintre.)	Luxembourg	
22 September	Paris–Camembert	UCI Europe Tour	Dorian Godon (FRA)	France	Livarot-Pays-d'Auge

== National, Continental and World champions 2020 ==
Date	Discipline	Jersey	Rider	Country	Location
12 January	French National Cyclo-cross Championships		Clément Venturini (FRA)	France	Flamanville
