= 2026 Boucles de la Mayenne =

French cycling race

2026 UCI ProSeries

Race details
- Dates: 28–31 May 2026
- Stages: 3 + Prologue
- Distance: 540.6 km (335.9 mi)
- Winning time: 12h 21' 47"

Results
Jersey awarded to the overall winner	Winner	Benoît Cosnefroy (FRA)	(UAE Team Emirates XRG)
	Second	Thibaud Gruel (FRA)	(Groupama–FDJ United)
	Third	Noa Isidore (FRA)	(Decathlon CMA CGM)
Jersey awarded to the points classification winner	Points	Olav Kooij (NED)	(Decathlon CMA CGM)
Jersey awarded to the mountains classification winner	Mountains	Tom Mainguenaud (FRA)	(Nice Métropole Côte d'Azur)
Jersey awarded to the young rider classification winner	Young rider	Thibaud Gruel (FRA)	(Groupama–FDJ United)
	Team	(France) Groupama–FDJ United	

The 2026 Boucles de la Mayenne (transl. Loops of the Mayenne) was a road cycling stage race that took place between 28 and 31 May 2026 in the Mayenne department in northwestern France. The race was rated as a category 2.Pro event on the 2026 UCI ProSeries calendar, and was the 51st edition of the Boucles de la Mayenne.

== Teams ==
Twelve UCI WorldTeams, five UCI ProTeams and five UCI Continental teams made up the 22 teams that participated in the race.

UCI WorldTeams

- Alpecin–Premier Tech
- Decathlon CMA CGM
- EF Education–EasyPost
- Groupama–FDJ United
- Lidl–Trek
- Lotto–Intermarché
- NSN Cycling Team
- Soudal–Quick-Step
- Team Picnic–PostNL
- UAE Team Emirates XRG
- Visma–Lease a Bike
- XDS Astana Team

UCI ProTeams

- Caja Rural–Seguros RGA
- Cofidis
- Team TotalEnergies
- Tudor Pro Cycling Team
- Unibet Rose Rockets

UCI Continental Teams

- CIC Pro Cycling Academy
- Nice Métropole Côte d'Azur
- Red Bull–Bora–Hansgrohe Rookies
- St. Michel–Preference Home–Auber93
- Van Rysel–Roubaix

== Route ==
Stage characteristics and winners
Stage	Date	Course	Distance	Type	Stage winner
P	28 May	Laval (Espace Mayenne)	5.4 km (3.4 mi)	Individual time trial	Julius Johansen (DEN)
1	29 May	Saint-Berthevin to Château-Gontier-sur-Mayenne	172.4 km (107.1 mi)	Hilly stage	Olav Kooij (NED)
2	30 May	Aron to Pré-en-Pail-Saint-Samson	215.1 km (133.7 mi)	Hilly stage	Benoît Cosnefroy (FRA)
3	31 May	Cossé-le-Vivien to Laval	147.7 km (91.8 mi)	Flat stage	Olav Kooij (NED)
Total			545.5 km (339.0 mi)		

== Stages ==
=== Prologue ===
28 May 2026 – Laval (Espace Mayenne), 5.4 km (3.4 mi)

Prologue Result
Rank	Rider	Team	Time
1	Julius Johansen (DEN)	UAE Team Emirates XRG	6' 36"
2	Jakob Söderqvist (SWE)	Lidl–Trek	+ 1"
3	Oscar Chamberlain (AUS)	Decathlon CMA CGM	+ 6"
4	Benoît Cosnefroy (FRA)	UAE Team Emirates XRG	+ 6"
5	Thibaud Gruel (FRA)	Groupama–FDJ United	+ 7"
6	Ivo Oliveira (POR)	UAE Team Emirates XRG	+ 7"
7	Søren Kragh Andersen (DEN)	Lidl–Trek	+ 8"
8	Héctor Álvarez (ESP)	Lidl–Trek	+ 9"
9	Maxime Decomble (FRA)	Groupama–FDJ United	+ 10"
10	Ethan Hayter (GBR)	Soudal–Quick-Step	+ 10"

General classification after Prologue
Rank	Rider	Team	Time
1	Julius Johansen (DEN)	UAE Team Emirates XRG	6' 36"
2	Jakob Söderqvist (SWE)	Lidl–Trek	+ 1"
3	Oscar Chamberlain (AUS)	Decathlon CMA CGM	+ 6"
4	Benoît Cosnefroy (FRA)	UAE Team Emirates XRG	+ 6"
5	Thibaud Gruel (FRA)	Groupama–FDJ United	+ 7"
6	Ivo Oliveira (POR)	UAE Team Emirates XRG	+ 7"
7	Søren Kragh Andersen (DEN)	Lidl–Trek	+ 8"
8	Héctor Álvarez (ESP)	Lidl–Trek	+ 9"
9	Maxime Decomble (FRA)	Groupama–FDJ United	+ 10"
10	Ethan Hayter (GBR)	Soudal–Quick-Step	+ 10"

=== Stage 1 ===
29 May 2026 – Saint-Berthevin to Château-Gontier-sur-Mayenne, 172.4 km (107.1 mi)

Stage 1 Result
Rank	Rider	Team	Time
1	Olav Kooij (NED)	Decathlon CMA CGM	3h 48' 49"
2	Alessio Magagnotti (ITA)	Red Bull–Bora–Hansgrohe Rookies	+ 0"
3	Anthony Turgis (FRA)	Team TotalEnergies	+ 0"
4	Alessio Delle Vedove (ITA)	XDS Astana Team	+ 0"
5	Juan Sebastián Molano (COL)	UAE Team Emirates XRG	+ 0"
6	Brady Gilmore (AUS)	NSN Cycling Team	+ 0"
7	Mads Pedersen (DEN)	Lidl–Trek	+ 0"
8	Vito Braet (BEL)	Lotto–Intermarché	+ 0"
9	Ronan Augé (FRA)	Unibet Rose Rockets	+ 0"
10	Clément Venturini (FRA)	Unibet Rose Rockets	+ 0"

General classification after stage 1
Rank	Rider	Team	Time
1	Julius Johansen (DEN)	UAE Team Emirates XRG	3h 55' 25"
2	Jakob Söderqvist (SWE)	Lidl–Trek	+ 1"
3	Oscar Chamberlain (AUS)	Decathlon CMA CGM	+ 6"
4	Benoît Cosnefroy (FRA)	UAE Team Emirates XRG	+ 6"
5	Thibaud Gruel (FRA)	Groupama–FDJ United	+ 6"
6	Ivo Oliveira (POR)	UAE Team Emirates XRG	+ 7"
7	Søren Kragh Andersen (DEN)	Lidl–Trek	+ 8"
8	Héctor Álvarez (ESP)	Lidl–Trek	+ 9"
9	Maxime Decomble (FRA)	Groupama–FDJ United	+ 10"
10	Ethan Hayter (GBR)	Soudal–Quick-Step	+ 10"

=== Stage 2 ===
30 May 2026 – Aron to Pré-en-Pail-Saint-Samson, 215.1 km (133.7 mi)

Stage 2 Result
Rank	Rider	Team	Time
1	Benoît Cosnefroy (FRA)	UAE Team Emirates XRG	5h 12' 50"
2	Noa Isidore (FRA)	Decathlon CMA CGM	+ 0"
3	Vincenzo Albanese (ITA)	EF Education–EasyPost	+ 0"
4	Brady Gilmore (AUS)	NSN Cycling Team	+ 0"
5	Clément Izquierdo (FRA)	Cofidis	+ 0"
6	Louis Barré (FRA)	Visma–Lease a Bike	+ 0"
7	Axel Mariault (FRA)	CIC Pro Cycling Academy	+ 0"
8	Alexandre Delettre (FRA)	Team TotalEnergies	+ 0"
9	Marco Brenner (GER)	Tudor Pro Cycling Team	+ 0"
10	Mads Pedersen (DEN)	Lidl–Trek	+ 0"

General classification after stage 2
Rank	Rider	Team	Time
1	Benoît Cosnefroy (FRA)	UAE Team Emirates XRG	9h 08' 11"
2	Thibaud Gruel (FRA)	Groupama–FDJ United	+ 7"
3	Noa Isidore (FRA)	Decathlon CMA CGM	+ 12"
4	Clément Izquierdo (FRA)	Cofidis	+ 15"
5	Aubin Sparfel (FRA)	Decathlon CMA CGM	+ 15"
6	Mads Pedersen (DEN)	Lidl–Trek	+ 19"
7	Louis Barré (FRA)	Visma–Lease a Bike	+ 19"
8	Alexandre Delettre (FRA)	Team TotalEnergies	+ 21"
9	Vincenzo Albanese (ITA)	EF Education–EasyPost	+ 23"
10	Marco Brenner (GER)	Tudor Pro Cycling Team	+ 24"

=== Stage 3 ===
31 May 2026 – Cossé-le-Vivien to Laval, 147.7 km (91.8 mi)

Stage 3 Result
Rank	Rider	Team	Time
1	Olav Kooij (NED)	Decathlon CMA CGM	3h 13' 36"
2	Mads Pedersen (DEN)	Lidl–Trek	+ 0"
3	John Degenkolb (GER)	Team Picnic–PostNL	+ 0"
4	Maikel Zijlaard (NED)	Tudor Pro Cycling Team	+ 0"
5	Marijn van den Berg (NED)	EF Education–EasyPost	+ 0"
6	Alberto Dainese (ITA)	Tudor Pro Cycling Team	+ 0"
7	Luke Lamperti (USA)	EF Education–EasyPost	+ 0"
8	Alessio Magagnotti (ITA)	Red Bull–Bora–Hansgrohe Rookies	+ 0"
9	Matthew Brennan (GBR)	Visma–Lease a Bike	+ 0"
10	Clément Venturini (FRA)	Unibet Rose Rockets	+ 0"

General classification after stage 3
Rank	Rider	Team	Time
1	Benoît Cosnefroy (FRA)	UAE Team Emirates XRG	12h 21' 47"
2	Thibaud Gruel (FRA)	Groupama–FDJ United	+ 7"
3	Noa Isidore (FRA)	Decathlon CMA CGM	+ 12"
4	Mads Pedersen (DEN)	Lidl–Trek	+ 13"
5	Clément Izquierdo (FRA)	Cofidis	+ 15"
6	Aubin Sparfel (FRA)	Decathlon CMA CGM	+ 15"
7	Louis Barré (FRA)	Visma–Lease a Bike	+ 19"
8	Alexandre Delettre (FRA)	Team TotalEnergies	+ 21"
9	Vincenzo Albanese (ITA)	EF Education–EasyPost	+ 23"
10	Marco Brenner (GER)	Tudor Pro Cycling Team	+ 24"

== Classification leadership table ==
Classification leadership by stage
Stage	Winner	General classification	Points classification	Mountains classification	Young rider classification	Team classification
P	Julius Johansen	Julius Johansen	Julius Johansen	not awarded	Oscar Chamberlain	UAE Team Emirates XRG
1	Olav Kooij	Julius Johansen	Olav Kooij	Tom Mainguenaud	Oscar Chamberlain	UAE Team Emirates XRG
2	Benoît Cosnefroy	Benoît Cosnefroy	Benoît Cosnefroy	Tom Mainguenaud	Thibaud Gruel	Groupama–FDJ United
3	Olav Kooij	Benoît Cosnefroy	Olav Kooij	Tom Mainguenaud	Thibaud Gruel	Groupama–FDJ United
Final		Benoît Cosnefroy	Olav Kooij	Tom Mainguenaud	Thibaud Gruel	Groupama–FDJ United

== Classification standings ==
Legend
Denotes the winner of the general classification	Denotes the winner of the mountains classification
Denotes the winner of the points classification	Denotes the winner of the young rider classification

=== General classification ===
Final general classification (1–10)
Rank	Rider	Team	Time
1	Benoît Cosnefroy (FRA)	UAE Team Emirates XRG	12h 21' 47"
2	Thibaud Gruel (FRA)	Groupama–FDJ United	+ 7"
3	Noa Isidore (FRA)	Decathlon CMA CGM	+ 12"
4	Mads Pedersen (DEN)	Lidl–Trek	+ 13"
5	Clément Izquierdo (FRA)	Cofidis	+ 15"
6	Aubin Sparfel (FRA)	Decathlon CMA CGM	+ 15"6
7	Louis Barré (FRA)	Visma–Lease a Bike	+ 19"
8	Alexandre Delettre (FRA)	Team TotalEnergies	+ 21"
9	Vincenzo Albanese (ITA)	EF Education–EasyPost	+ 23"
10	Marco Brenner (GER)	Tudor Pro Cycling Team	+ 24"

=== Points classification ===
Final points classification (1–10)
Rank	Rider	Team	Points
1	Olav Kooij (NED)	Decathlon CMA CGM	50
2	Benoît Cosnefroy (FRA)	UAE Team Emirates XRG	39
3	Mads Pedersen (DEN)	Lidl–Trek	36
4	Alessio Magagnotti (ITA)	Red Bull–Bora–Hansgrohe Rookies	28
5	Brady Gilmore (AUS)	NSN Cycling Team	24
6	Thibaud Gruel (FRA)	Groupama–FDJ United	23
7	Julius Johansen (DEN)	UAE Team Emirates XRG	20
8	Noa Isidore (FRA)	Decathlon CMA CGM	20
9	Maikel Zijlaard (NED)	Tudor Pro Cycling Team	19
10	Baptiste Veistroffer (FRA)	Lotto–Intermarché	18

=== Mountains classification ===
Final mountains classification (1–10)
Rank	Rider	Team	Points
1	Tom Mainguenaud (FRA)	Nice Métropole Côte d'Azur	44
2	Pierre Thierry (FRA)	Team TotalEnergies	15
3	Mads Pedersen (DEN)	Lidl–Trek	14
4	Matthias Schwarzbacher (SVK)	EF Education–EasyPost	13
5	Léandre Huck (FRA)	Van Rysel–Roubaix	10
6	Aubin Sparfel (FRA)	Decathlon CMA CGM	8
7	Marco Brenner (GER)	Tudor Pro Cycling Team	8
8	Jakob Söderqvist (SWE)	Lidl–Trek	8
9	Julius van den Berg (NED)	Team Picnic–PostNL	8
10	Ethan Hayter (GBR)	Soudal–Quick-Step	8

=== Young rider classification ===
Final young rider classification (1–10)
Rank	Rider	Team	Time
1	Thibaud Gruel (FRA)	Groupama–FDJ United	12h 21' 54"
2	Noa Isidore (FRA)	Decathlon CMA CGM	+ 5"
3	Aubin Sparfel (FRA)	Decathlon CMA CGM	+ 8"
4	Maxime Vezie (FRA)	CIC Pro Cycling Academy	+ 55"
5	Matthew Brennan (GBR)	Visma–Lease a Bike	+ 1' 03"
6	Anatol Friedl (AUT)	Red Bull–Bora–Hansgrohe Rookies	+ 1' 11"
7	Maxime Decomble (FRA)	Groupama–FDJ United	+ 2' 07"
8	Pietro Mattio (ITA)	Visma–Lease a Bike	+ 2' 17"
9	Héctor Álvarez (ESP)	Lidl–Trek	+ 3' 51"
10	Ashlin Barry (USA)	Visma–Lease a Bike	+ 4' 48"

=== Team classification ===
Final team classification (1–10)
Rank	Team	Time
1	(France) Groupama–FDJ United	37h 08' 11"
2	(Netherlands) Visma–Lease a Bike	+ 16"
3	(France) Team TotalEnergies	+ 47"
4	(Germany) Lidl–Trek	+ 53"
5	(United Arab Emirates) UAE Team Emirates XRG	+ 6' 46"
6	(France) CIC Pro Cycling Academy	+ 9' 50"
7	(France) Decathlon CMA CGM	+ 10' 41"
8	(Spain) Caja Rural–Seguros RGA	+ 11' 53"
9	(Switzerland) NSN Cycling Team	+ 12' 01"
10	(Belgium) Soudal–Quick-Step	+ 13' 38"
