= 2026 Grand Prix du Morbihan =

2026 UCI ProSeries

Race details
- Dates: 9 May 2026
- Stages: 1
- Distance: 190 km (120 mi)
- Winning time: 4h 35' 17"

Results
	Winner	Benoît Cosnefroy (FRA)	(UAE Team Emirates XRG)
	Second	Noa Isidore (FRA)	(Decathlon CMA CGM)
	Third	Paul Lapeira (FRA)	(Decathlon CMA CGM)

The 2026 Grand Prix du Morbihan was the 49th edition of the Grand Prix du Morbihan, a one-day road cycling race held on 9 May 2026, starting and finishing in Plumelec, in the Brittany region of northwestern France.

== Teams ==
Seven of the eighteen UCI WorldTeams, seven UCI ProTeams, and five UCI Continental teams made up the nineteen teams that participated in the race.

UCI WorldTeams

- Decathlon CMA CGM
- Groupama–FDJ United
- Lotto–Intermarché
- NSN Cycling Team
- UAE Team Emirates XRG
- Uno-X Mobility
- Visma–Lease a Bike

UCI ProTeams

- Burgos Burpellet BH
- Caja Rural–Seguros RGA
- Cofidis
- Equipo Kern Pharma
- Pinarello–Q36.5 Pro Cycling Team
- Team TotalEnergies
- Unibet Rose Rockets

UCI Continental Teams

- CIC Pro Cycling Academy
- Lucky Sport Cycling Team
- Nice Métropole Côte d'Azur
- St. Michel–Preference Home–Auber93
- Van Rysel–Roubaix

== Result ==
Result
Rank	Rider	Team	Time
1	Benoît Cosnefroy (FRA)	UAE Team Emirates XRG	4h 35' 17"
2	Noa Isidore (FRA)	Decathlon CMA CGM	+ 0"
3	Paul Lapeira (FRA)	Decathlon CMA CGM	+ 0"
4	Thibaud Gruel (FRA)	Groupama–FDJ United	+ 0"
5	Clément Venturini (FRA)	Unibet Rose Rockets	+ 0"
6	Axel Zingle (FRA)	Visma–Lease a Bike	+ 0"
7	Valentin Ferron (FRA)	Cofidis	+ 0"
8	Riley Sheehan (USA)	NSN Cycling Team	+ 0"
9	Brent Van Moer (BEL)	Pinarello–Q36.5 Pro Cycling Team	+ 0"
10	Axel Mariault (FRA)	CIC Pro Cycling Academy	+ 0"
