= Fernando Barceló =

Spanish bicycle racer

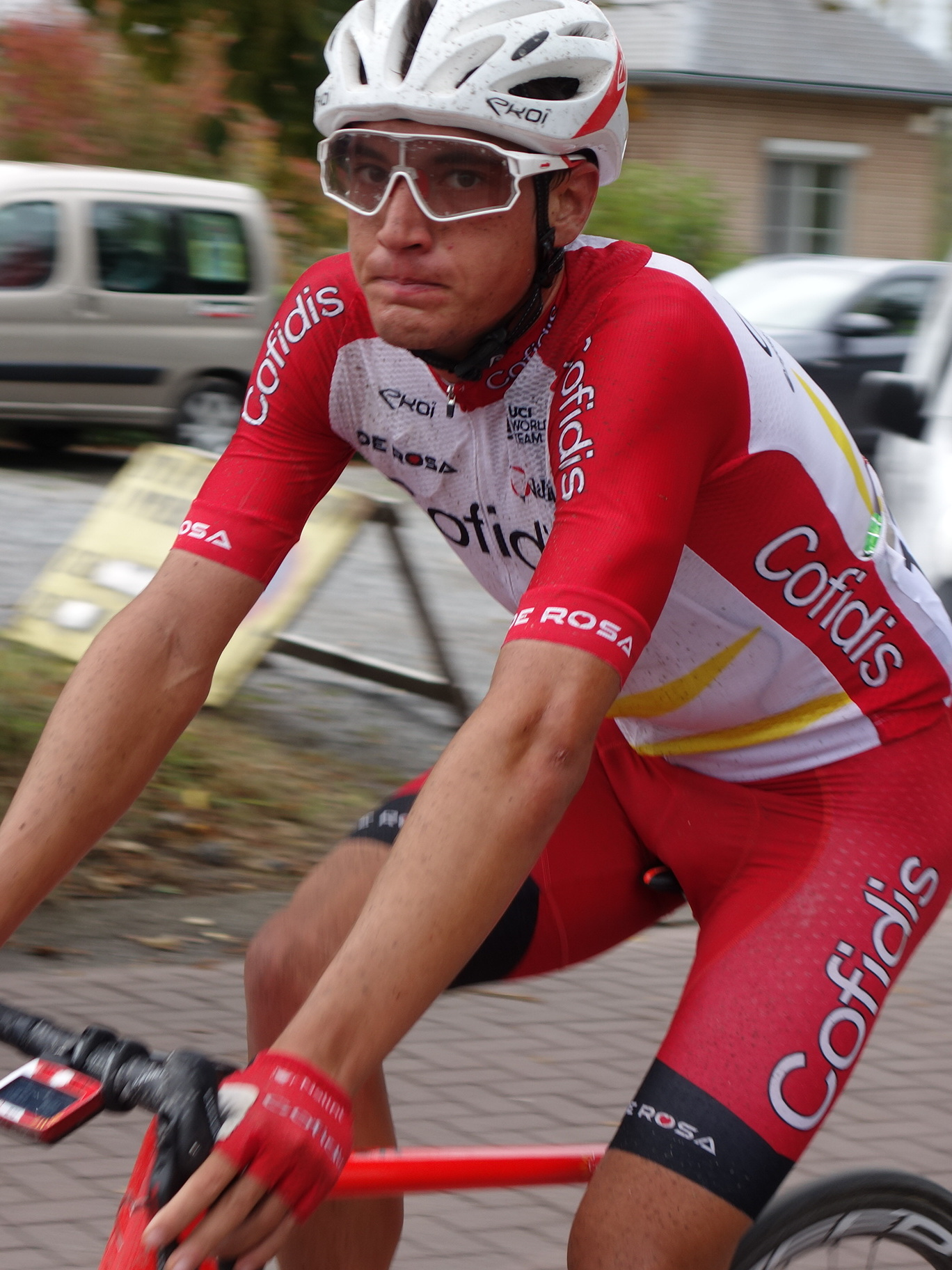
- Barceló at the 2020 La Flèche Wallonne

Personal information
- Full name: Fernando Barceló Aragón
- Born: 6 January 1996 (age 30) Huesca, Spain
- Height: 1.73 m (5 ft 8 in)
- Weight: 62 kg (137 lb)

Cycling career
- Sport: Cycling
- Current team: Cofidis
- Discipline: Road
- Role: Rider

Amateur teams
- 2013–2016: Specialized–Fundación Alberto Contador
- 2017: Fundación Euskadi–EDP

Professional teams
- 2017: Cofidis (stagiaire)
- 2018–2019: Euskadi–Murias
- 2020–2021: Cofidis
- 2022–: Caja Rural–Seguros RGA
Medal record
Representing Spain
Men's road bicycle racing
European Championships
Bronze medal – third place	2018 Brno	Under-23 road race

Fernando Barceló Aragón (born 6 January 1996) is a Spanish cyclist, who currently rides for UCI ProTeam Caja Rural–Seguros RGA. In August 2019, he was named in the startlist for the 2019 Vuelta a España.

== Major results ==
2014
1st Time trial, National Junior Road Championships
2018
1st Stage 9 Tour de l'Avenir
7th Overall Volta ao Alentejo
3rd Road race, UEC European Under-23 Road Championships
2019
6th Tour de Vendée
7th GP Miguel Induráin
10th Overall Vuelta a Aragón
2021
4th Overall Tour de Wallonie
2022
7th Overall Troféu Joaquim Agostinho
8th Prueba Villafranca de Ordizia
9th Overall Tour of Slovenia
10th Circuito de Getxo
2023
6th Trofeo Andratx–Mirador D'es Colomer
2024
4th Overall Troféu Joaquim Agostinho
6th Overall Vuelta a Asturias
10th GP Miguel Induráin
2025
2nd Road race, National Road Championships
6th Prueba Villafranca de Ordizia
7th Overall Vuelta a Asturias
8th Overall Tour of Slovenia
9th Grand Prix du Morbihan
2026
8th Brabantse Pijl
9th Trofeo Serra Tramuntana
10th Ronde van Limburg

=== Grand Tour general classification results timeline ===
Grand Tour	2019	2020	2021	2022	2023
Giro d'Italia	—	—	—	—	—
Tour de France	—	—	—	—	—
Vuelta a España	95	DNF	89	—	48

Legend
—	Did not compete
DNF	Did not finish
