= 2026 UCI ProSeries =

International road cycling contest

- Seventh edition of the UCI ProSeries

Details
- Dates: 27 January – 18 October
- Location: Asia, Australia, Europe, United States
- Races: 61

The 2026 UCI ProSeries is the seventh season of the UCI ProSeries, the second tier road cycling tour, below the UCI World Tour, but above the various regional UCI Continental Circuits.

The calendar consists of 61 events, of which 34 are one-day races (1.Pro), and 27 are stage races (2.Pro). There are 53 events in Europe, six in Asia, and one each in the United States and Australia.

There are races from 2025 demoted to UCI Continental Circuits such as Tour of Taihu Lake and Dwars door het Hageland, while some races such as AlUla Tour, Surf Coast Classic and CRO Race were upgraded from 2025 UCI Continental Circuits.

== Events ==
Races in the 2026 UCI ProSeries
Race	Date	Winner	Team	Ref.
(Saudi Arabia) AlUla Tour	27–31 January	Jan Christen (SUI)	UAE Team Emirates XRG	
(Australia) Surf Coast Classic	29 January	Cancelled		
(Spain) Volta a la Comunitat Valenciana	4–8 February	Remco Evenepoel (BEL)	Red Bull–Bora–Hansgrohe	
(Oman) Muscat Classic	6 February	Mauro Schmid (SUI)	Team Jayco–AlUla	
Tour of Oman	7–11 February	Christian Scaroni (ITA)	XDS Astana Team	
(Portugal) Figueira Champions Classic	14 February	António Morgado (POR)	UAE Team Emirates XRG	
(Spain) Clásica de Almería	15 February	Biniam Girmay (ERI)	NSN Cycling Team	
(Spain) Vuelta a Andalucía	18–22 February	Iván Romeo (ESP)	Movistar Team	
(Portugal) Volta ao Algarve	18–22 February	Juan Ayuso (ESP)	Lidl–Trek	
(France) Faun–Ardèche Classic	28 February	Paul Seixas (FRA)	Decathlon CMA CGM	
(France) Faun Drôme Classic	1 March	Romain Grégoire (FRA)	Groupama–FDJ United	
(Belgium) Kuurne–Brussels–Kuurne	1 March	Matthew Brennan (GBR)	Visma–Lease a Bike	
(Italy) Trofeo Laigueglia	4 March	Santiago Buitrago (COL)	Team Bahrain Victorious	
(Italy) Milano–Torino	18 March	Tom Pidcock (GBR)	Pinarello–Q36.5 Pro Cycling Team	
(Belgium) Nokere Koerse	18 March	Jasper Philipsen (BEL)	Alpecin–Premier Tech	
(France) GP de Denain	19 March	Alec Segaert (BEL)	Team Bahrain Victorious	
(Belgium) Bredene Koksijde Classic	20 March	Dylan Groenewegen (NED)	Unibet Rose Rockets	
(Spain) GP Miguel Induráin	4 April	Ion Izagirre (ESP)	Cofidis	
(France) Région Pays de la Loire Tour	7–10 April	Antoine L'Hote (FRA)	Decathlon CMA CGM	
(Belgium) Scheldeprijs	8 April	Tim Merlier (BEL)	Soudal–Quick-Step	
(China) Tour of Hainan	15–19 April	Guillermo Thomas Silva (URU)	XDS Astana Team	
(Belgium) Brabantse Pijl	17 April	Anders Foldager (DEN)	Team Jayco–AlUla	
(Italy) Tour of the Alps	20–24 April	Giulio Pellizzari (ITA)	Red Bull–Bora–Hansgrohe	
(Turkey) Tour of Turkiye	26 April – 3 May	Sebastian Berwick (AUS)	Caja Rural–Seguros RGA	
(France) GP du Morbihan	9 May	Benoît Cosnefroy (FRA)	UAE Team Emirates XRG	
(France) Tro-Bro Léon	10 May	Filippo Fiorelli (ITA)	Visma–Lease a Bike	
(Hungary) Tour de Hongrie	13–17 May	Jakob Söderqvist (SWE)	Lidl–Trek	
(France) Classique Dunkerque	19 May	Artem Shmidt (USA)	Netcompany INEOS	
(France) Four Days of Dunkirk	20–24 May	Laurence Pithie (NZL)	Red Bull–Bora–Hansgrohe	
Tour of Norway	28–31 May	Cancelled		
(France) Boucles de la Mayenne	28–31 May	Benoît Cosnefroy (FRA)	UAE Team Emirates XRG	
(Belgium) Tour de Wallonie	1–5 June	Ben Oliver (NZL)	Modern Adventure Pro Cycling	
(Belgium) Brussels Cycling Classic	7 June	Jordi Meeus (BEL)	Red Bull–Bora–Hansgrohe	
(Belgium) Circuit Franco–Belge	10 June	Corbin Strong (NZL)	NSN Cycling Team	
Tour of Slovenia	17–21 June	Florian Lipowitz (GER)	Red Bull–Bora–Hansgrohe	
Tour of Belgium	17–21 June	Jasper Philipsen (BEL)	Alpecin–Premier Tech	
(China) Tour of Magnificent Qinghai	11–18 July	Jonathan Klever Caicedo (ECU)	Wheeltop Rotor Chengdu Team	
Tour of Denmark	29 July – 2 August	Wout van Aert (BEL)	Visma–Lease a Bike	
(Spain) Vuelta a Burgos	4–8 August	Felix Gall (AUT)	Decathlon CMA CGM	
Arctic Race of Norway	13–16 August	Guillermo Thomas Silva (URU)	XDS Astana Team	
(Czech Republic) Czech Tour	13–16 August	Andrew August (USA)	Netcompany INEOS	
(Germany) Deutschland Tour	19–23 August	Isaac del Toro (MEX)	UAE Team Emirates XRG	
(United Kingdom) Tour of Britain	2–6 September	Tim Wellens (BEL)	UAE Team Emirates XRG	
(United States) Maryland Cycling Classic	5–7 September	Cancelled		
(Italy) GP Industria & Artigianato	6 September	Tom Pidcock (GBR)	Pinarello–Q36.5 Pro Cycling Team	
(Italy) Coppa Sabatini	10 September	Benoît Cosnefroy (FRA)	UAE Team Emirates XRG	
(France) GP de Fourmies	13 September	Arvid de Kleijn (NED)	Tudor Pro Cycling Team	
(Belgium) GP de Wallonie	16 September	Aubin Sparfel (FRA)	Decathlon CMA CGM	
Tour de Luxembourg	16–20 September	Davide Piganzoli (ITA)	Visma–Lease a Bike	
(Belgium) Flandrien 0.0 Classic	19 September	Henrik Pedersen (DEN)	Uno-X Mobility	
(Croatia) CRO Race	22–27 September	Tobias Svarre (DEN)	Uno-X Mobility	
(Malaysia) Tour de Langkawi	27 September – 4 October	Lennart Jasch (GER)	Tudor Pro Cycling Team	
(Italy) Giro dell'Emilia	3 October	Davide Piganzoli (ITA)	Visma–Lease a Bike	
(Germany) Münsterland Giro	3 October	Olav Kooij (NED)	Decathlon CMA CGM	
(Italy) Coppa Bernocchi	5 October	Noa Isidore (FRA)	Decathlon CMA CGM	
(Italy) Tre Valli Varesine	6 October	Jarno Widar (BEL)	Lotto–Intermarché	
(Italy) Gran Piemonte	8 October	Dorian Godon (FRA)	Netcompany INEOS	
(France) Paris–Tours	11 October	Per Strand Hagenes (NOR)	Visma–Lease a Bike	
(Italy) Giro del Veneto	14 October	Alessandro Covi (ITA)	Team Jayco–AlUla	
(Italy) Veneto Classic	18 October	Brandon McNulty (USA)	UAE Team Emirates XRG	
Japan Cup	18 October	Quinn Simmons (USA)	Lidl–Trek	
