= 2022 Grand Prix Cycliste de Québec =

One-day cycling race in Canada

2022 UCI World Tour, race 29 of 31
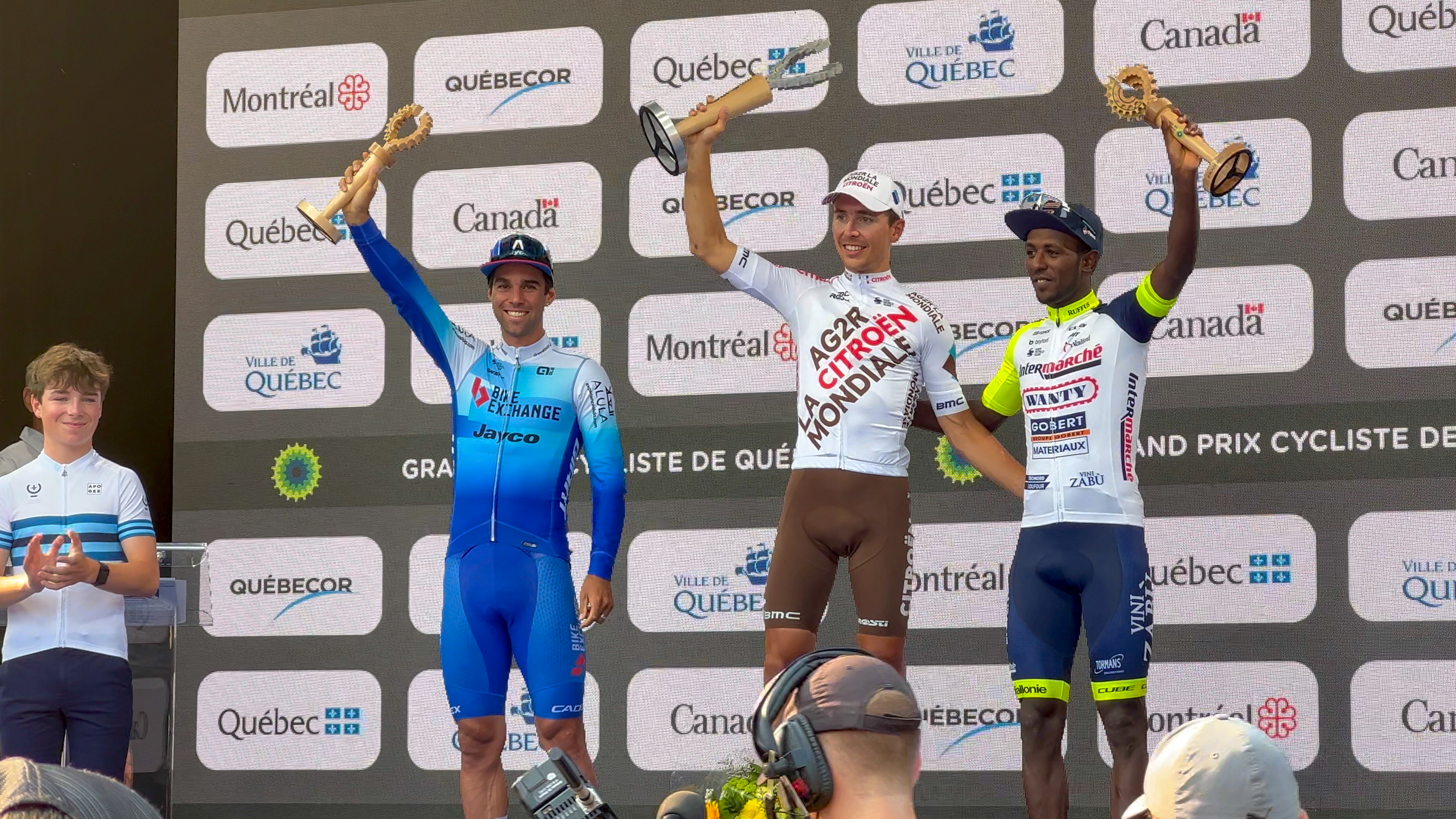

Race details
- Dates: 9 September 2022
- Stages: 1
- Distance: 201.6 km (125.3 mi)
- Winning time: 4h 46' 56"

Results
| | Winner | Benoît Cosnefroy (FRA) | (AG2R Citroën Team) |
| | Second | Michael Matthews (AUS) | (Team BikeExchange–Jayco) |
| | Third | Biniam Girmay (ERI) | (Intermarché–Wanty–Gobert Matériaux) |

The 2022 Grand Prix Cycliste de Québec was a road cycling one-day race that took place on 9 September 2022 in Quebec City, Canada. It was the 11th edition of the Grand Prix Cycliste de Québec and the 29th event of the 2022 UCI World Tour.

== Teams ==
All eighteen UCI WorldTeams, two UCI ProTeams, and the Canadian national team made up the twenty-one teams that participated in the race.

UCI WorldTeams

- AG2R Citroën Team
- Astana Qazaqstan Team
- Bora–Hansgrohe
- Cofidis
- EF Education–EasyPost
- Groupama–FDJ
- Ineos Grenadiers
- Intermarché–Wanty–Gobert Matériaux
- Israel–Premier Tech
- Lotto–Soudal
- Movistar Team
- Quick-Step Alpha Vinyl Team
- Team Bahrain Victorious
- Team BikeExchange–Jayco
- Team DSM
- Team Jumbo–Visma
- Trek–Segafredo
- UAE Team Emirates

UCI ProTeams

- Arkéa–Samsic
- Team TotalEnergies

National Teams

- Canada

== Result ==
Result
| Rank | Rider | Team | Time |
|---|---|---|---|
| 1 | Benoît Cosnefroy (FRA) | AG2R Citroën Team | 4h 46' 56" |
| 2 | Michael Matthews (AUS) | Team BikeExchange–Jayco | + 4" |
| 3 | Biniam Girmay (ERI) | Intermarché–Wanty–Gobert Matériaux | + 4" |
| 4 | Wout van Aert (BEL) | Team Jumbo–Visma | + 4" |
| 5 | Iván García Cortina (ESP) | Movistar Team | + 4" |
| 6 | Mikkel Frølich Honoré (DEN) | Quick-Step Alpha Vinyl Team | + 4" |
| 7 | Adam Yates (GBR) | Ineos Grenadiers | + 4" |
| 8 | Alberto Bettiol (ITA) | EF Education–EasyPost | + 4" |
| 9 | Diego Ulissi (ITA) | UAE Team Emirates | + 4" |
| 10 | Warren Barguil (FRA) | Arkéa–Samsic | + 4" |
