= 2024 Tour des Alpes-Maritimes =

2024 UCI Europe Tour

Race details
- Dates: 17–18 February 2024
- Stages: 2
- Distance: 297.3 km (184.7 mi)
- Winning time: 7h 09' 12"

Results
Jersey awarded to the overall winner	Winner	Benoît Cosnefroy (FRA)	(Decathlon–AG2R La Mondiale)
	Second	Vincenzo Albanese (ITA)	(Arkéa–B&B Hotels)
	Third	Aurélien Paret-Peintre (FRA)	(Decathlon–AG2R La Mondiale)
Jersey awarded to the points classification winner	Points	Benoît Cosnefroy (FRA)	(Decathlon–AG2R La Mondiale)
Jersey awarded to the mountains classification winner	Mountains	Mattéo Vercher (FRA)	(Team TotalEnergies)
Jersey awarded to the youth classification winner	Youth	Bastien Tronchon (FRA)	(Decathlon–AG2R La Mondiale)
	Team	Decathlon–AG2R La Mondiale	

The 2024 Tour des Alpes-Maritimes was a road cycling stage race that took place between 17 and 18 February 2024 in the department of Alpes-Maritimes in southeastern France. The race was rated as a category 2.1 event on the 2024 UCI Europe Tour calendar, and was the 56th edition of the Tour des Alpes-Maritimes.

== Teams ==
Five of the 18 UCI WorldTeams, five UCI ProTeams, and six UCI Continental teams make up the 16 teams that are participating in the race. All but two teams entered a full squad of seven riders and two riders did not start stage 1, for a total of 108 riders who started the race.

UCI WorldTeams

- Arkéa–B&B Hotels
- Cofidis
- Decathlon–AG2R La Mondiale
- Groupama–FDJ
- Team dsm–firmenich PostNL

UCI ProTeams

- Bingoal WB
- Israel–Premier Tech
- Team Corratec–Vini Fantini
- Team TotalEnergies
- Uno-X Mobility

UCI Continental Teams

- CIC U Nantes Atlantique
- Lidl–Trek Future Racing
- Lotto–Dstny Development Team
- Nice Métropole Côte d'Azur
- St. Michel–Mavic–Auber93
- Van Rysel–Roubaix

== Route ==
Stage characteristics and winners
Stage	Date	Course	Distance	Type	Stage winner
1	17 February	Levens to Antibes	165.5 km (102.8 mi)	Hilly stage	Ethan Vernon (GBR)
2	18 February	Villefranche-sur-Mer to Vence	131.8 km (81.9 mi)	Medium mountain stage	Benoît Cosnefroy (FRA)
Total			297.3 km (184.7 mi)		

== Stages ==
=== Stage 1 ===
17 February 2024 – Levens to Antibes, 165.5 km (102.8 mi)

Stage 1 Result (1–10)
Rank	Rider	Team	Time
1	Ethan Vernon (GBR)	Israel–Premier Tech	3h 55' 37"
2	Sean Flynn (GBR)	Team dsm–firmenich PostNL	+ 0"
3	Vincenzo Albanese (ITA)	Arkéa–B&B Hotels	+ 0"
4	Tobias Halland Johannessen (NOR)	Uno-X Mobility	+ 0"
5	Guillaume Boivin (CAN)	Israel–Premier Tech	+ 0"
6	Fabien Lienhard (SUI)	Groupama–FDJ	+ 0"
7	Romain Bardet (FRA)	Team dsm–firmenich PostNL	+ 0"
8	Benoît Cosnefroy (FRA)	Decathlon–AG2R La Mondiale	+ 0"
9	Kevin Vermaerke (USA)	Arkéa–B&B Hotels	+ 0"
10	Matys Grisel (FRA)	Lotto–Dstny Development Team	+ 0"

General classification after Stage 1 (1–10)
Rank	Rider	Team	Time
1	Ethan Vernon (GBR)	Israel–Premier Tech	3h 55' 27"
2	Sean Flynn (GBR)	Team dsm–firmenich PostNL	+ 4"
3	Vincenzo Albanese (ITA)	Arkéa–B&B Hotels	+ 6"
4	Aurélien Paret-Peintre (FRA)	Decathlon–AG2R La Mondiale	+ 9"
5	Jordan Labrosse (FRA)	Decathlon–AG2R La Mondiale	+ 9"
6	Tobias Halland Johannessen (NOR)	Uno-X Mobility	+ 10"
7	Guillaume Boivin (CAN)	Israel–Premier Tech	+ 10"
8	Fabien Lienhard (SUI)	Groupama–FDJ	+ 10"
9	Romain Bardet (FRA)	Team dsm–firmenich PostNL	+ 10"
10	Benoît Cosnefroy (FRA)	Decathlon–AG2R La Mondiale	+ 10"

=== Stage 2 ===
18 February 2024 – Villefranche-sur-Mer to Vence, 131.8 km (81.9 mi)

Stage 2 Result (1–10)
Rank	Rider	Team	Time
1	Benoît Cosnefroy (FRA)	Decathlon–AG2R La Mondiale	3h 13' 45"
2	Aurélien Paret-Peintre (FRA)	Decathlon–AG2R La Mondiale	+ 0"
3	Vincenzo Albanese (ITA)	Arkéa–B&B Hotels	+ 0"
4	Anthony Perez (FRA)	Cofidis	+ 0"
5	Romain Grégoire (FRA)	Groupama–FDJ	+ 0"
6	Jordan Jegat (FRA)	Team TotalEnergies	+ 0"
7	Bastien Tronchon (FRA)	Decathlon–AG2R La Mondiale	+ 0"
8	Rémi Capron (FRA)	Van Rysel–Roubaix	+ 0"
9	Jonathan Lastra (ESP)	Cofidis	+ 0"
10	Alexandre Delettre (FRA)	St. Michel–Mavic–Auber93	+ 0"

General classification after Stage 2 (1–10)
Rank	Rider	Team	Time
1	Benoît Cosnefroy (FRA)	Decathlon–AG2R La Mondiale	7h 09' 12"
2	Vincenzo Albanese (ITA)	Arkéa–B&B Hotels	+ 2"
3	Aurélien Paret-Peintre (FRA)	Decathlon–AG2R La Mondiale	+ 3"
4	Alexandre Delettre (FRA)	St. Michel–Mavic–Auber93	+ 10"
5	Bastien Tronchon (FRA)	Decathlon–AG2R La Mondiale	+ 10"
6	Kevin Vermaerke (USA)	Team dsm–firmenich PostNL	+ 10"
7	Romain Grégoire (FRA)	Groupama–FDJ	+ 10"
8	Guillaume Martin (FRA)	Cofidis	+ 10"
9	Quentin Pacher (FRA)	Groupama–FDJ	+ 10"
10	Michael Woods (CAN)	Israel–Premier Tech	+ 10"

== Classification leadership table ==
Classification leadership by stage
Stage	Winner	General classification	Points classification	Mountains classification	Young rider classification	Team classification
1	Ethan Vernon	Ethan Vernon	Ethan Vernon	Jordan Labrosse	Ethan Vernon	Team dsm–firmenich PostNL
2	Benoît Cosnefroy	Benoît Cosnefroy	Benoît Cosnefroy	Mattéo Vercher	Bastien Tronchon	Decathlon–AG2R La Mondiale
Final		Benoît Cosnefroy	Benoît Cosnefroy	Mattéo Vercher	Bastien Tronchon	Decathlon–AG2R La Mondiale

== Final classification standings ==
Legend
Denotes the leader of the general classification	Denotes the leader of the mountains classification
Denotes the leader of the points classification	Denotes the leader of the young rider classification

=== General classification ===
Final general classification (1–10)
Rank	Rider	Team	Time
1	Benoît Cosnefroy (FRA)	Decathlon–AG2R La Mondiale	7h 09' 12"
2	Vincenzo Albanese (ITA)	Arkéa–B&B Hotels	+ 2"
3	Aurélien Paret-Peintre (FRA)	Decathlon–AG2R La Mondiale	+ 3"
4	Alexandre Delettre (FRA)	St. Michel–Mavic–Auber93	+ 10"
5	Bastien Tronchon (FRA)	Decathlon–AG2R La Mondiale	+ 10"
6	Kevin Vermaerke (USA)	Team dsm–firmenich PostNL	+ 10"
7	Romain Grégoire (FRA)	Groupama–FDJ	+ 10"
8	Guillaume Martin (FRA)	Cofidis	+ 10"
9	Quentin Pacher (FRA)	Groupama–FDJ	+ 10"
10	Michael Woods (CAN)	Israel–Premier Tech	+ 10"
