= 2026 Brabantse Pijl =

2026 UCI ProSeries
- Event poster with previous winners Remco Evenepoel and Elisa Longo Borghini

Race details
- Dates: 17 April 2026
- Stages: 1
- Distance: 100.6 km (62.5 mi)
- Winning time: 3h 36' 30"

Results
	Winner	Anders Foldager (DEN)	(Team Jayco–AlUla)
	Second	Quinten Hermans (BEL)	(Pinarello–Q36.5 Pro Cycling Team)
	Third	Benoît Cosnefroy (FRA)	(UAE Team Emirates XRG)

The 2026 Brabantse Pijl was the 66th edition of the Brabantse Pijl cycle race and was held on 17 April 2026 as a category 1.Pro race on the 2026 UCI ProSeries calendar. The race covered 162.6 km (101.0 mi), starting in Beersel and finishing in Overijse.

== Teams ==
Nineteen teams participated in the race: ten of the eighteen UCI WorldTeams, seven UCI ProTeams and two UCI Continental teams.

UCI WorldTeams

- Alpecin–Premier Tech
- EF Education–EasyPost
- Groupama–FDJ United
- Lotto–Intermarché
- NSN Cycling Team
- Soudal–Quick-Step
- Team Bahrain Victorious
- Team Jayco–AlUla
- UAE Team Emirates XRG
- Uno-X Mobility

UCI ProTeams

- Burgos Burpellet BH
- Caja Rural–Seguros RGA
- Cofidis
- Pinarello–Q36.5 Pro Cycling Team
- Team Flanders–Baloise
- Team TotalEnergies
- Unibet Rose Rockets

UCI Continental Teams

- BEAT CC p/b Saxo
- Tarteletto–Isorex

== Result ==
Result (1-10)
Rank	Rider	Team	Time
1	Anders Foldager (DEN)	Team Jayco–AlUla	3h 36' 30"
2	Quinten Hermans (BEL)	Pinarello–Q36.5 Pro Cycling Team	+ 0"
3	Benoît Cosnefroy (FRA)	UAE Team Emirates XRG	+ 0"
4	Romain Grégoire (FRA)	Groupama–FDJ United	+ 0"
5	Eduard Prades (ESP)	Caja Rural–Seguros RGA	+ 0"
6	Fredrik Dversnes (NOR)	Uno-X Mobility	+ 0"
7	Luca Van Boven (BEL)	Lotto–Intermarché	+ 0"
8	Fernando Barceló (ESP)	Caja Rural–Seguros RGA	+ 0"
9	Brady Gilmore (AUS)	NSN Cycling Team	+ 0"
10	Alex Molenaar (NED)	Caja Rural–Seguros RGA	+ 0"
