= 2011 UCI Cyclo-cross World Championships – Men's junior race =

Men's Junior Cyclo-cross Race
2011 UCI Cyclo-cross World Championships
- Rainbow jersey

Race details
- Dates: January 29, 2011
- Stages: 1
- Winning time: 44' 31"

Medalists
| | Gold | Clément Venturini (FRA) |
| | Silver | Fabien Doubey (FRA) |
| | Bronze | Loïc Doubey (FRA) |

This event was held on Saturday 29 January 2011 as part of the 2011 UCI Cyclo-cross World Championships in Sankt Wendel, Germany.

== Ranking ==
| Rank | Cyclist | Time |
|---|---|---|
| Gold medal | Clément Venturini (FRA) | 44:31 |
| Silver medal | Fabien Doubey (FRA) | + 0:15 |
| Bronze medal | Loïc Doubey (FRA) | + 0:15 |
| 4 | Jakub Skala (CZE) | + 0:36 |
| 5 | Laurens Sweeck (BEL) | + 0:37 |
| 6 | Michael Vanthourenhout (BEL) | + 0:45 |
| 7 | Dominic Zumstein (SUI) | + 0:51 |
| 8 | Silvio Herklotz (GER) | + 1:09 |
| 9 | Vojtech Nipl (CZE) | + 1:18 |
| 10 | Stan Godrie (NED) | + 1:29 |
| 11 | Lars Forster (SUI) | + 1:34 |
| 12 | Julian Lehmann (GER) | + 1:38 |
| 13 | Fabian Lienhard (SUI) | + 1:41 |
| 14 | Yorben Van Tichelt (BEL) | + 1:41 |
| 15 | Daniel Peeters (BEL) | + 1:47 |
| 16 | Toki Sawada (JPN) | + 2:14 |
| 17 | Jonathan Lastra Martinez (ESP) | + 2:35 |
| 18 | Twan Brusselman (NED) | + 2:37 |
| 19 | Jack Clarkson (GBR) | + 2:54 |
| 20 | Jens Vandekinderen (BEL) | + 3:01 |
| 21 | Andrew Dillman (USA) | + 3:05 |
| 22 | Hugo Robinson (GBR) | + 3:06 |
| 23 | Lorenzo Samparisi (ITA) | + 3:09 |
| 24 | Jaap De Man (NED) | + 3:18 |
| 25 | Jeffrey Bahnson (USA) | + 3:20 |
| 26 | Yannick Eckmann (GER) | + 3:32 |
| 27 | Riccardo Redaelli (ITA) | + 3:32 |
| 28 | Douwe Verberne (NED) | + 3:53 |
| 29 | Tomas Medek (CZE) | + 3:54 |
| 30 | Tomas Svoboda (CZE) | + 3:55 |
| 31 | Emil Arvid Olsen (DEN) | + 4:03 |
| 32 | Marcos Altur Boronat (ESP) | + 4:11 |
| 33 | Luke Grivell-Mellor (GBR) | + 4:19 |
| 34 | Alistair Slater (GBR) | + 4:20 |
| 35 | Yohan Patry (CAN) | + 4:22 |
| 36 | Ondrej Glajza (SVK) | + 4:23 |
| 37 | Marcin Malewicz (POL) | + 4:34 |
| 38 | Enrico Scapolan (ITA) | + 4:50 |
| 39 | Viliam Bodis (SVK) | + 4:50 |
| 40 | Tomas Bohata (CZE) | + 5:00 |
| 41 | Karl Hoppner (CAN) | + 5:00 |
| 42 | Jan Dieteren (GER) | + 5:29 |
| 43 | Andri Frischknecht (SUI) | Lapped |
| 44 | Emil Linde (SWE) | Lapped |
| 45 | Patryk Kostecki (POL) | Lapped |
| 46 | Sven Fritsch (LUX) | Lapped |
| 47 | Joseph Moses (GBR) | Lapped |
| 48 | Wojciech Malec (POL) | Lapped |
| 49 | Yannick Gruner (GER) | Lapped |
| 50 | Bjorn Fox (USA) | Lapped |
| 51 | Federico Zurlo (ITA) | Lapped |
| 52 | Jimmy Reinert (LUX) | Lapped |
| 53 | Bogdan Vlad (ROU) | Lapped |
| 54 | Benjamin Perry (CAN) | Lapped |
| 55 | Patrick Jäger (AUT) | Lapped |
| 56 | Gregor Mühlberger (AUT) | Lapped |
| 57 | Tom Schwarmes (LUX) | Lapped |
| 58 | Wojciech Szyniec (POL) | Lapped |
