= 2022 Amstel Gold Race =

Cycling race

2022 UCI World Tour, race 14 of 32

Race details
- Dates: 10 April 2022
- Stages: 1
- Distance: 254.1 km (157.9 mi)
- Winning time: 6h 01' 19"

Results
	Winner	Michał Kwiatkowski (POL)	(Ineos Grenadiers)
	Second	Benoît Cosnefroy (FRA)	(AG2R Citroën Team)
	Third	Tiesj Benoot (BEL)	(Team Jumbo–Visma)

The 2022 Amstel Gold Race was a road cycling one-day race that took place on 10 April 2022 in the Netherlands. It was the 56th edition of the Amstel Gold Race and the 14th event of the 2022 UCI World Tour. The race was won by Michał Kwiatkowski in a photo finish with Benoît Cosnefroy.

== Teams ==
Twenty-five teams were invited to the race, including all eighteen UCI WorldTeams and seven UCI ProTeams.

UCI WorldTeams

- AG2R Citroën Team
- Astana Qazaqstan Team
- Bora–Hansgrohe
- Cofidis
- Quick-Step Alpha Vinyl Team
- EF Education–EasyPost
- Groupama–FDJ
- Ineos Grenadiers
- Intermarché–Wanty–Gobert Matériaux
- Israel–Premier Tech
- Lotto–Soudal
- Movistar Team
- Team Bahrain Victorious
- Team BikeExchange–Jayco
- Team DSM
- Team Jumbo–Visma
- Trek–Segafredo
- UAE Team Emirates

UCI ProTeams

- Alpecin–Fenix
- Arkéa–Samsic
- Bardiani–CSF–Faizanè
- B&B Hotels–KTM
- Bingoal Pauwels Sauces WB
- Sport Vlaanderen–Baloise
- Team TotalEnergies

== Result ==
Result
Rank	Rider	Team	Time
1	Michał Kwiatkowski (POL)	Ineos Grenadiers	6h 01' 19"
2	Benoît Cosnefroy (FRA)	AG2R Citroën Team	+ 0"
3	Tiesj Benoot (BEL)	Team Jumbo–Visma	+ 10"
4	Mathieu van der Poel (NED)	Alpecin–Fenix	+ 20"
5	Alexander Kamp (DEN)	Trek–Segafredo	+ 20"
6	Kasper Asgreen (DEN)	Quick-Step Alpha Vinyl Team	+ 20"
7	Michael Matthews (AUS)	Team BikeExchange–Jayco	+ 20"
8	Stefan Küng (SUI)	Groupama–FDJ	+ 20"
9	Marc Hirschi (SUI)	UAE Team Emirates	+ 20"
10	Dylan Teuns (BEL)	Team Bahrain Victorious	+ 20"
