= 2026 Circuit Franco-Belge =

2025 UCI ProSeries

Race details
- Dates: 10 June 2026
- Stages: 1
- Distance: 195.6 km (121.5 mi)
- Winning time: 4h 32' 18"

Results
	Winner	Corbin Strong (NZL)	(NSN Cycling Team)
	Second	Anders Foldager (DEN)	(Team Jayco–AlUla)
	Third	Paul Magnier (FRA)	(Soudal–Quick-Step)

The 2026 Circuit Franco-Belge was the 85th edition of the Circuit Franco-Belge. It was held on 10 June 2026 as part of the 2026 UCI ProSeries calendar.

== Teams ==
Ten UCI WorldTeams, twelve UCI ProTeams, and three UCI Continental teams made up the 25 teams that participated in the race.

UCI WorldTeams

- Alpecin–Premier Tech
- EF Education–EasyPost
- Groupama–FDJ United
- Lotto–Intermarché
- NSN Cycling Team
- Soudal–Quick-Step
- Team Jayco–AlUla
- Team Picnic–PostNL
- Uno-X Mobility
- Visma–Lease a Bike

UCI ProTeams

- Caja Rural–Seguros RGA
- Cofidis
- Equipo Kern Pharma
- Euskaltel–Euskadi
- MBH Bank CSB Telecom Fort
- Pinarello–Q36.5 Pro Cycling Team
- Team Flanders–Baloise
- Team Novo Nordisk
- Team Polti VisitMalta
- Team TotalEnergies
- Tudor Pro Cycling Team
- Unibet Rose Rockets

UCI Continental Teams

- Aarco
- Color Code–Alu Center
- Van Rysel–Roubaix

== Result ==
Result
Rank	Rider	Team	Time
1	Corbin Strong (NZL)	NSN Cycling Team	4h 32' 18"
2	Anders Foldager (DEN)	Team Jayco–AlUla	+ 0"
3	Paul Magnier (FRA)	Soudal–Quick-Step	+ 0"
4	Rick Pluimers (NED)	Tudor Pro Cycling Team	+ 0"
5	Jenno Berckmoes (BEL)	Lotto–Intermarché	+ 0"
6	Francisco Joel Peñuela (VEN)	Caja Rural–Seguros RGA	+ 0"
7	Clément Venturini (FRA)	Unibet Rose Rockets	+ 0"
8	Eduard Prades (SPA)	Caja Rural–Seguros RGA	+ 0"
9	Marijn van den Berg (NED)	EF Education–EasyPost	+ 0"
10	Alexandre Delettre (FRA)	Team TotalEnergies	+ 3"
