= 2026 Coppa Sabatini =

- 2026 UCI ProSeries

Race details
- Dates: 10 September 2026
- Stages: 1
- Distance: 197.6 km (122.8 mi)
- Winning time: 4h 40' 55"

Results
	Winner	Benoît Cosnefroy (FRA)	(UAE Team Emirates XRG)
	Second	Clément Venturini (FRA)	(Unibet Rose Rockets)
	Third	Romain Grégoire (FRA)	(Groupama–FDJ United)

The 2026 Coppa Sabatini (also known as the Gran Premio città di Peccioli) was the 74th edition of the Coppa Sabatini road cycling one day race, which was held on 10 September 2026 as part of the 2026 UCI ProSeries calendar.

== Teams ==
Nine UCI WorldTeams, twelve UCI ProTeams, and one UCI Continental teams made up the twenty-two teams that participated in the race.

UCI WorldTeams

- Cofidis
- EF Education–EasyPost
- Groupama–FDJ United
- Movistar Team
- Red Bull–Bora–Hansgrohe
- Team Bahrain Victorious
- Team Jayco–AlUla
- UAE Team Emirates XRG
- Uno-X Mobility
- XDS Astana Team

UCI ProTeams

- Bardiani–CSF 7 Saber
- Burgos Burpellet BH
- Caja Rural–Seguros RGA
- Equipo Kern Pharma
- Euskaltel–Euskadi
- Team Polti VisitMalta
- Pinarello–Q36.5 Pro Cycling Team
- Solution Tech NIPPO Rali
- Team TotalEnergies
- Tudor Pro Cycling Team
- Unibet Rose Rockets

UCI Continental Teams

- MBH Bank CSB Telecom Fort

== Result ==
Result
Rank	Rider	Team	Time
1	Benoît Cosnefroy (FRA)	UAE Team Emirates XRG	4h 40' 55"
2	Clément Venturini (FRA)	Unibet Rose Rockets	+ 0"
3	Romain Grégoire (FRA)	Groupama–FDJ United	+ 0"
4	Christian Scaroni (ITA)	XDS Astana Team	+ 0"
5	Alex Aranburu (ESP)	Cofidis	+ 0"
6	Giulio Pellizzari (ITA)	Red Bull–Bora–Hansgrohe	+ 0"
7	Alexandre Delettre (FRA)	Team TotalEnergies	+ 0"
8	Ludovico Crescioli (ITA)	Team Polti VisitMalta	+ 0"
9	Markus Hoelgaard (NOR)	Uno-X Mobility	+ 0"
10	Lukas Nerurkar (GBR)	EF Education–EasyPost	+ 0"
