= 2021 Bretagne Classic Ouest-France =

One-day cycling race in France

2021 Bretagne Classic Ouest–France
2021 UCI World Tour, race 25 of 29

Race details
- Dates: 29 August 2021
- Stages: 1
- Distance: 251 km (156 mi)
- Winning time: 5h 59' 56"

Results
	Winner	Benoît Cosnefroy (FRA)	(AG2R Citroën Team)
	Second	Julian Alaphilippe (FRA)	(Deceuninck–Quick-Step)
	Third	Mikkel Frølich Honoré (DEN)	(Deceuninck–Quick-Step)

The 2021 Bretagne Classic Ouest–France is a road cycling one-day race that took place on 29 August 2021 in the region of Brittany in northwestern France. It was the 85th edition of the Bretagne Classic Ouest–France and the 25th event of the 2021 UCI World Tour.

The 251-kilometre (156 mi) race started and ended in Plouay, featuring a hilly and undulating course with 4,036 metres (13,241 ft) of elevation gain. The first half of the race saw riders head west out of Ploauy and ride through Scaër on the way to Douarnenez along the Atlantic coast. Once there, the course turned back east towards Ploauy and once again passed through Scaër to form a rough figure eight. On the way back to Ploauy after passing through Scaër for the second time, riders ascended Saoutalarin, the race's only gravel climb. The race concluded with a 13.68-kilometre (8.50 mi) finishing circuit in and around Ploauy. The last marked climb, the Bosse Pont-Neuf, crested with 2 kilometres (1.2 mi) to go before a slight descent into the final kilometre, with the final 300 metres (980 ft) being slightly uphill to the finish line.

== Teams ==
All nineteen UCI WorldTeams and five UCI ProTeams made up the twenty-four teams that participated in the race. Of these teams, only four did not field a full squad of seven riders. EF Education–Nippo, Movistar Team, and Team BikeExchange each raced with six riders. Team Bahrain Victorious originally planned on withdrawing from the race after a COVID-19 case in the team; however, the day before the race, they decided to enter with just five riders. In total, 163 riders started the race, of which only 96 finished.

UCI WorldTeams

- AG2R Citroën Team
- Astana–Premier Tech
- Bora–Hansgrohe
- Cofidis
- Deceuninck–Quick-Step
- EF Education–Nippo
- Groupama–FDJ
- INEOS Grenadiers
- Intermarché–Wanty–Gobert Matériaux
- Israel Start-Up Nation
- Lotto–Soudal
- Movistar Team
- Team Bahrain Victorious
- Team BikeExchange
- Team DSM
- Team Jumbo–Visma
- Team Qhubeka NextHash
- Trek–Segafredo
- UAE Team Emirates

UCI ProTeams

- Arkéa–Samsic
- B&B Hotels p/b KTM
- Burgos BH
- Delko
- Team TotalEnergies

== Result ==
Result
Rank	Rider	Team	Time
1	Benoît Cosnefroy (FRA)	AG2R Citroën Team	5h 59' 56"
2	Julian Alaphilippe (FRA)	Deceuninck–Quick-Step	+ 0"
3	Mikkel Frølich Honoré (DEN)	Deceuninck–Quick-Step	+ 3"
4	Ethan Hayter (GBR)	INEOS Grenadiers	+ 13"
5	Connor Swift (GBR)	Arkéa–Samsic	+ 13"
6	Franck Bonnamour (FRA)	B&B Hotels p/b KTM	+ 13"
7	Jasper Stuyven (BEL)	Trek–Segafredo	+ 13"
8	Valentin Madouas (FRA)	Groupama–FDJ	+ 13"
9	Quentin Pacher (FRA)	B&B Hotels p/b KTM	+ 16"
10	Giacomo Nizzolo (ITA)	Team Qhubeka NextHash	+ 17"
