= Luca Van Boven =

Belgian cyclist

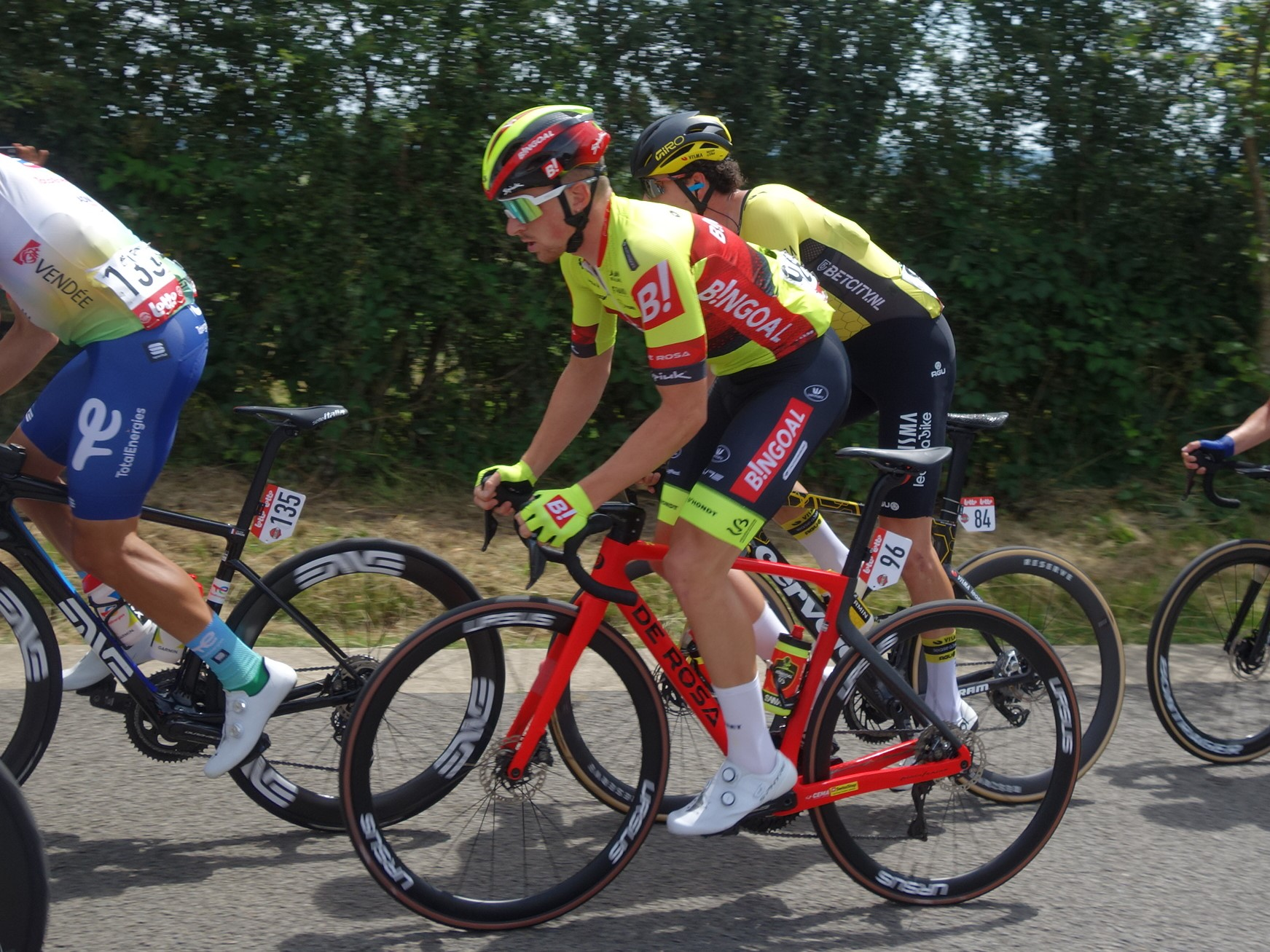
- Van Boven in 2024

Personal information
- Born: 6 January 2000 (age 26) Zottegem, Belgium
- Height: 1.79 m (5 ft 10 in)
- Weight: 68 kg (150 lb)

Cycling career
- Sport: Cycling
- Current team: Lotto–Intermarché
- Discipline: Road
- Role: Rider

Amateur teams
- 2016–2017: Baguet–MIBA Poorten–Indulek-Derito
- 2017: Tieltse Rennersclub
- 2018: Meubelen Gaverzicht–Glascentra
- 2019–2020: GM Recycling Team
- 2021–2022: Lotto–Soudal U23

Professional teams
- 2023–2024: Bingoal WB
- 2025: Intermarché–Wanty
- 2026–: Lotto–Intermarché

Luca Van Boven (born 6 January 2000) is a Belgian cyclist, who currently rides for UCI WorldTeam Lotto–Intermarché.

== Major results ==
2018
10th Overall Ronde des Vallées
2021
1st Grand Prix des Marbriers
2022
7th Overall Circuit des Ardennes International
8th Liège–Bastogne–Liège U23
9th Overall Okolo Jižních Čech
10th Overall Le Tour de Savoie Mont Blanc
2023
1st Omloop Het Nieuwsblad U23
1st Trofeo Città di Meldola
2nd Trofeo Alcide Degasperi
5th Coppa Zappi
8th Boucles de l'Aulne
2024
4th Overall Four Days of Dunkirk
6th Grand Prix du Morbihan
2025
6th Overall Tour de Kyushu
7th Route Adélie
2026
7th Brabantse Pijl

=== Grand Tour general classification results timeline ===
Grand Tour	2025
Giro d'Italia	—
Tour de France	—
Vuelta a España	118

Legend
—	Did not compete
DNF	Did not finish
