= 2024 Grand Prix du Morbihan =

2024 UCI ProSeries

Race details
- Dates: 4 May 2024
- Stages: 1
- Distance: 196.4 km (122.0 mi)
- Winning time: 4h 51' 20"

Results
	Winner	Benoît Cosnefroy (FRA)	(Decathlon–AG2R La Mondiale)
	Second	Axel Zingle (FRA)	(Cofidis)
	Third	Arnaud De Lie (BEL)	(Lotto–Dstny)

The 2024 Grand Prix du Morbihan was the 47th edition of the Grand Prix du Morbihan, a one-day road cycling race held on 4 May 2025, starting from Josselin and ending in Plumelec, in the Brittany region of northwestern France.

== Teams ==
Six of the eighteen UCI WorldTeams, nine UCI ProTeams, and four UCI Continental teams made up the 19 teams that participated in the race.

UCI WorldTeams

- Arkéa–B&B Hotels
- Cofidis
- Decathlon–AG2R La Mondiale
- Groupama–FDJ
- Intermarché–Wanty
- Team dsm–firmenich PostNL

UCI ProTeams

- Bingoal WB
- Burgos BH
- Caja Rural–Seguros RGA
- Equipo Kern Pharma
- Euskaltel–Euskadi
- Lotto–Dstny
- Q36.5 Pro Cycling Team
- Team TotalEnergies
- Uno-X Mobility

UCI Continental Teams

- CIC U Nantes Atlantique
- Nice Métropole Côte d'Azur
- St. Michel–Mavic–Auber93
- Van Rysel–Roubaix

== Result ==
Result
Rank	Rider	Team	Time
1	Benoît Cosnefroy (FRA)	Decathlon–AG2R La Mondiale	4h 51' 20"
2	Axel Zingle (FRA)	Cofidis	+ 0"
3	Arnaud De Lie (BEL)	Lotto–Dstny	+ 0"
4	Clément Venturini (FRA)	Arkéa–B&B Hotels	+ 0"
5	Fredrik Dversnes (NOR)	Uno-X Mobility	+ 0"
6	Luca Van Boven (BEL)	Bingoal WB	+ 0"
7	Vincenzo Albanese (ITA)	Arkéa–B&B Hotels	+ 0"
8	Odd Christian Eiking (NOR)	Uno-X Mobility	+ 0"
9	Xabier Berasategi (ESP)	Euskaltel–Euskadi	+ 0"
10	David González (ESP)	Caja Rural–Seguros RGA	+ 0"
