= 2025 Grand Prix du Morbihan =

2025 UCI ProSeries

Race details
- Dates: 10 May 2025
- Stages: 1
- Distance: 190 km (118.1 mi)
- Winning time: 4h 32' 35"

Results
	Winner	Benoît Cosnefroy (FRA)	(Decathlon–AG2R La Mondiale)
	Second	Kévin Vauquelin (FRA)	(Arkéa–B&B Hotels)
	Third	Clément Venturini (FRA)	(Arkéa–B&B Hotels)

The 2025 Grand Prix du Morbihan was the 48th edition of the Grand Prix du Morbihan, a one-day road cycling race held on 10 May 2025, starting and finishing in Plumelec, in the Brittany region of northwestern France.

== Teams ==
Eight of the eighteen UCI WorldTeams, eight UCI ProTeams, and four UCI Continental teams made up the twenty teams that participated in the race.

UCI WorldTeams

- Arkéa–B&B Hotels
- Cofidis
- Decathlon–AG2R La Mondiale
- Groupama–FDJ
- Intermarché–Wanty
- Movistar Team
- Team Bahrain Victorious
- XDS Astana Team

UCI ProTeams

- Caja Rural–Seguros RGA
- Equipo Kern Pharma
- Euskaltel–Euskadi
- Lotto
- Q36.5 Pro Cycling Team
- Team TotalEnergies
- Unibet Tietema Rockets
- Uno-X Mobility

UCI Continental Teams

- CIC–U–Nantes
- Nice Métropole Côte d'Azur
- St. Michel–Preference Home–Auber93
- Van Rysel–Roubaix

== Result ==
Result
Rank	Rider	Team	Time
1	Benoît Cosnefroy (FRA)	Decathlon–AG2R La Mondiale	4h 32' 35"
2	Kévin Vauquelin (FRA)	Arkéa–B&B Hotels	+ 0"
3	Clément Venturini (FRA)	Arkéa–B&B Hotels	+ 0"
4	Guillermo Thomas Silva (URU)	Caja Rural–Seguros RGA	+ 0"
5	Pau Miquel (ESP)	Equipo Kern Pharma	+ 0"
6	Emilien Jeannière (FRA)	Team TotalEnergies	+ 0"
7	Francisco Joel Peñuela (VEN)	Caja Rural–Seguros RGA	+ 0"
8	Joel Nicolau (ESP)	Caja Rural–Seguros RGA	+ 0"
9	Fernando Barceló (ESP)	Caja Rural–Seguros RGA	+ 0"
10	Ruben Guerreiro (POR)	Movistar Team	+ 0"
