= 2026 Grand Prix de Wallonie =

2026 UCI ProSeries

Race details
- Dates: 16 September 2026
- Stages: 1
- Distance: 196.8 km (122.3 mi)
- Winning time: 4h 32' 14"

Results
	Winner	Aubin Sparfel (FRA)	(Decathlon CMA CGM)
	Second	Romain Grégoire (FRA)	(Groupama–FDJ United)
	Third	Milan Fretin (BEL)	(Cofidis)

The 2026 Grand Prix de Wallonie was the 66th edition of the Grand Prix de Wallonie road cycling one day race, which was held on 16 September 2026 as part of the 2026 UCI ProSeries calendar.

== Teams ==
Eleven UCI WorldTeams, six UCI ProTeams, and five UCI Continental teams made up the twenty-two teams that participated in the race.

UCI WorldTeams

- Alpecin–Premier Tech
- Decathlon CMA CGM
- Groupama–FDJ United
- Lidl–Trek
- Lotto–Intermarché
- Movistar Team
- NSN Cycling Team
- Red Bull–Bora–Hansgrohe
- UAE Team Emirates XRG
- Uno-X Mobility
- XDS Astana Team

UCI ProTeams

- Cofidis
- Pinarello–Q36.5 Pro Cycling Team
- Team Polti VisitMalta
- Team Flanders–Baloise
- Team TotalEnergies
- Tudor Pro Cycling Team
- Unibet Rose Rockets

UCI Continental Teams

- BEAT CC p/b Saxo
- Color Code–Alu Center
- Tarteletto–Isorex
- Van Rysel–Roubaix

== Result ==
Result
Rank	Rider	Team	Time
1	Aubin Sparfel (FRA)	Decathlon CMA CGM	4h 30' 15"
2	Romain Grégoire (FRA)	Groupama–FDJ United	+ 0"
3	Milan Fretin (BEL)	Cofidis	+ 0"
4	Benoît Cosnefroy (FRA)	UAE Team Emirates XRG	+ 0"
5	Paul Lapeira (FRA)	Decathlon CMA CGM	+ 0"
6	Jenno Berckmoes (BEL)	Lotto–Intermarché	+ 0"
7	Roger Adrià (ESP)	Movistar Team	+ 0"
8	Baptiste Vadic (FRA)	Team TotalEnergies	+ 0"
9	Dylan Teuns (BEL)	Cofidis	+ 0"
10	Clément Venturini (FRA)	Unibet Rose Rockets	+ 0"
