= Vincenzo Albanese =

Italian bicycle racer

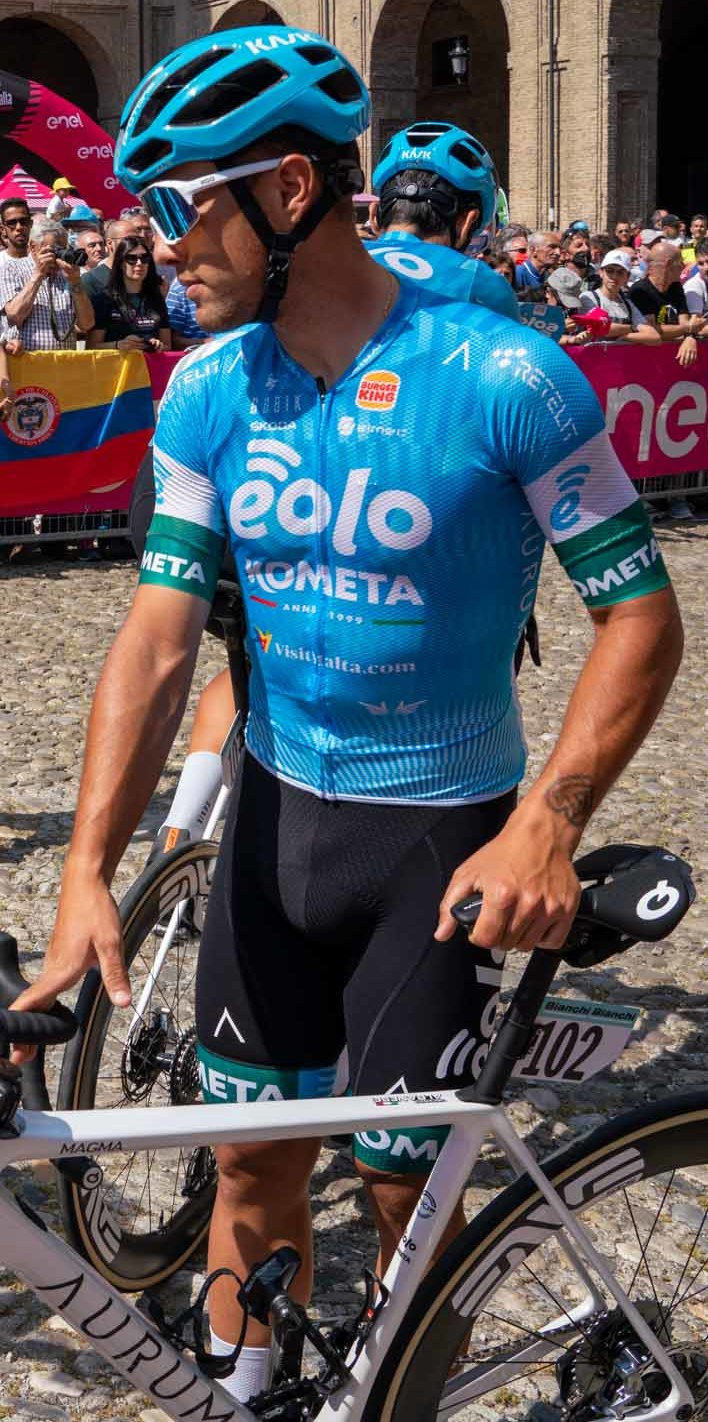
- Albanese at the 2022 Giro d'Italia

Personal information
- Full name: Vincenzo Albanese
- Born: 12 November 1996 (age 29) Oliveto Citra, Italy
- Height: 1.75 m (5 ft 9 in)
- Weight: 70 kg (154 lb)

Cycling career
- Sport: Cycling
- Current team: EF Education–EasyPost
- Discipline: Road
- Role: Rider
- Rider type: All-rounder

Amateur teams
- 2015: GS Mastromarco–Chianti Sensi
- 2016: Hopplà–Petroli Firenze

Professional teams
- 2017–2020: Bardiani–CSF
- 2021–2023: Eolo–Kometa
- 2024: Arkéa–B&B Hotels
- 2025–: EF Education–EasyPost

Vincenzo Albanese (born 12 November 1996 in Oliveto Citra) is an Italian cyclist who currently rides for UCI WorldTeam EF Education–EasyPost.

== Major results ==
2014
2nd Trofeo San Rocco
6th Trofeo Buffoni
2015
7th Ruota d'Oro
9th Gran Premio della Liberazione
2016 (1 pro win)
1st Trofeo Matteotti
1st Trofeo Edil C
1st Gran Premio della Liberazione
1st Ruota d'Oro
Tour de l'Avenir

1st Points classification
1st Stage 1

2nd Road race, National Under-23 Road Championships
5th Overall Oberösterreich Rundfahrt

1st Stage 1

7th Road race, UEC European Under-23 Road Championships
2017
5th Road race, UCI Under-23 Road World Championships
2018
9th Coppa Bernocchi
2020
5th Trofeo Matteotti
2021
2nd Memorial Marco Pantani
5th Coppa Ugo Agostoni
6th Giro del Veneto
10th Overall Tour du Limousin
Giro d'Italia

Held after Stages 2–3

2022 (1)
1st Stage 4 Tour du Limousin
3rd Trofeo Calvià
4th Overall Tour of Slovenia
4th Overall CRO Race
6th Coppa Sabatini
7th Overall Giro di Sicilia
9th Clásica de Almería
10th Clàssica Comunitat Valenciana 1969
2023
1st Points classification, Vuelta a Asturias
2nd Coppa Bernocchi
3rd Overall Giro di Sicilia

1st Points classification

7th Trofeo Matteotti
8th Giro della Toscana
8th Coppa Agostoni
9th Memorial Marco Pantani
2024
2nd Overall Tour des Alpes-Maritimes
2nd Prueba Villafranca de Ordizia
3rd Memorial Marco Pantani
5th Binche–Chimay–Binche
5th Coppa Agostoni
5th Tour du Finistère
6th GP Industria & Artigianato di Larciano
6th Circuit Franco-Belge
7th Grand Prix du Morbihan
7th Grand Prix of Aargau Canton
9th E3 Saxo Classic
9th Coppa Sabatini
9th Boucles de l'Aulne
9th Trofeo Calvià
2025 (1)
1st Stage 2 Tour de Suisse
4th Memorial Marco Pantani
8th Omloop Het Nieuwsblad
9th GP Gippingen
2026
9th Overall Boucles de la Mayenne

=== Grand Tour general classification results timeline ===
Grand Tour	2017	2018	2019	2020	2021	2022	2023	2024	2025
Giro d'Italia	DNF	—	—	—	75	68	70	—	—
Tour de France	—	—	—	—	—	—	—	—	—
Vuelta a España	Has not contested during his career								

Legend
—	Did not compete
DNF	Did not finish
