= 2024 Brabantse Pijl =

2024 UCI ProSeries
- Event poster with previous winners Dorian Godon and Silvia Persico

Race details
- Dates: 10 April 2024
- Stages: 1
- Distance: 195.2 km (121.3 mi)
- Winning time: 4h 17' 02"

Results
	Winner	Benoît Cosnefroy (FRA)	(Decathlon–AG2R La Mondiale)
	Second	Dylan Teuns (BEL)	(Israel–Premier Tech)
	Third	Tim Wellens (BEL)	(UAE Team Emirates)

The 2024 Brabantse Pijl was the 64th edition of the Brabantse Pijl cycle race and was held on 10 April 2024. The race covered 195.2 km (121.3 mi), starting in Leuven and finishing in Overijse.

== Teams ==
Eleven of the eighteen UCI WorldTeams and eleven UCI ProTeams made up the twenty-two teams that participated in the race. Every team entered 7 riders except for UAE Team Emirates, Team dsm–firmenich PostNL, Israel–Premier Tech who started with only 6 riders and Cofidis who only started with 5.

UCI WorldTeams

- Alpecin–Deceuninck
- Arkéa–B&B Hotels
- Cofidis
- Decathlon–AG2R La Mondiale
- EF Education–EasyPost
- Intermarché–Wanty
- Soudal–Quick-Step
- Team Bahrain Victorious
- Team dsm–firmenich PostNL
- Team Jayco–AlUla
- UAE Team Emirates

UCI ProTeams

- Bingoal WB
- Caja Rural–Seguros RGA
- Israel–Premier Tech
- Lotto–Dstny
- Q36.5 Pro Cycling Team
- TDT–Unibet Cycling Team
- Team Flanders–Baloise
- Team Novo Nordisk
- Team TotalEnergies
- Tudor Pro Cycling Team
- Uno-X Mobility

== Result ==
Result
Rank	Rider	Team	Time
1	Benoît Cosnefroy (FRA)	Decathlon–AG2R La Mondiale	4h 17' 02"
2	Dylan Teuns (BEL)	Israel–Premier Tech	+ 0"
3	Tim Wellens (BEL)	UAE Team Emirates	+ 0"
4	Joseph Blackmore (GBR)	Israel–Premier Tech	+ 0"
5	Jefferson Alveiro Cepeda (ECU)	Caja Rural–Seguros RGA	+ 0"
6	Quinten Hermans (BEL)	Alpecin–Deceuninck	+ 0"
7	Marijn van den Berg (NED)	EF Education–EasyPost	+ 10"
8	Michael Matthews (AUS)	Team Jayco–AlUla	+ 28"
9	Vito Braet (BEL)	Intermarché–Wanty	+ 28"
10	Corbin Strong (NZL)	Israel–Premier Tech	+ 28"
