= 2026 Tro-Bro Léon =

2026 UCI ProSeries

Race details
- Dates: 10 May 2026
- Stages: 1
- Distance: 202.1 km (125.6 mi)
- Winning time: 4h 47' 35"

Results
	Winner	Filippo Fiorelli (ITA)	(Visma–Lease a Bike)
	Second	Alexis Renard (FRA)	(Cofidis)
	Third	Lewis Askey (GBR)	(Groupama–FDJ United)

The 2026 Tro-Bro Léon was the 42nd edition of Tro-Bro Léon, a one-day road cycling race in and around Lannilis, in the northwestern French region of Brittany, that took place on 10 May 2026.

== Teams ==
Seven of the eighteen UCI WorldTeams, seven UCI ProTeams, and five UCI Continental teams made up the nineteen teams that participated in the race.

UCI WorldTeams

- Decathlon CMA CGM
- Groupama–FDJ United
- Lotto–Intermarché
- NSN Cycling Team
- UAE Team Emirates XRG
- Uno-X Mobility
- Visma–Lease a Bike

UCI ProTeams

- Burgos Burpellet BH
- Caja Rural–Seguros RGA
- Cofidis
- Equipo Kern Pharma
- Pinarello–Q36.5 Pro Cycling Team
- Team TotalEnergies
- Unibet Rose Rockets

UCI Continental Teams

- CIC Pro Cycling Academy
- Lucky Sport Cycling Team
- Nice Métropole Côte d'Azur
- St. Michel–Preference Home–Auber93
- Van Rysel–Roubaix

== Result ==
Result
Rank	Rider	Team	Time
1	Filippo Fiorelli (ITA)	Visma–Lease a Bike	4h 47' 35"
2	Alexis Renard (FRA)	Cofidis	+ 0"
3	Lewis Askey (GBR)	Groupama–FDJ United	+ 0"
4	Pierre Gautherat (FRA)	Decathlon CMA CGM	+ 0"
5	Rasmus Tiller (NOR)	Uno-X Mobility	+ 0"
6	Benoît Cosnefroy (FRA)	UAE Team Emirates XRG	+ 0"
7	Axel Zingle (FRA)	Visma–Lease a Bike	+ 0"
8	Clément Venturini (FRA)	Unibet Rose Rockets	+ 0"
9	Fred Wright (GBR)	Pinarello–Q36.5 Pro Cycling Team	+ 0"
10	Per Strand Hagenes (NOR)	Visma–Lease a Bike	+ 7"
