= Stan Godrie =

Dutch cyclist

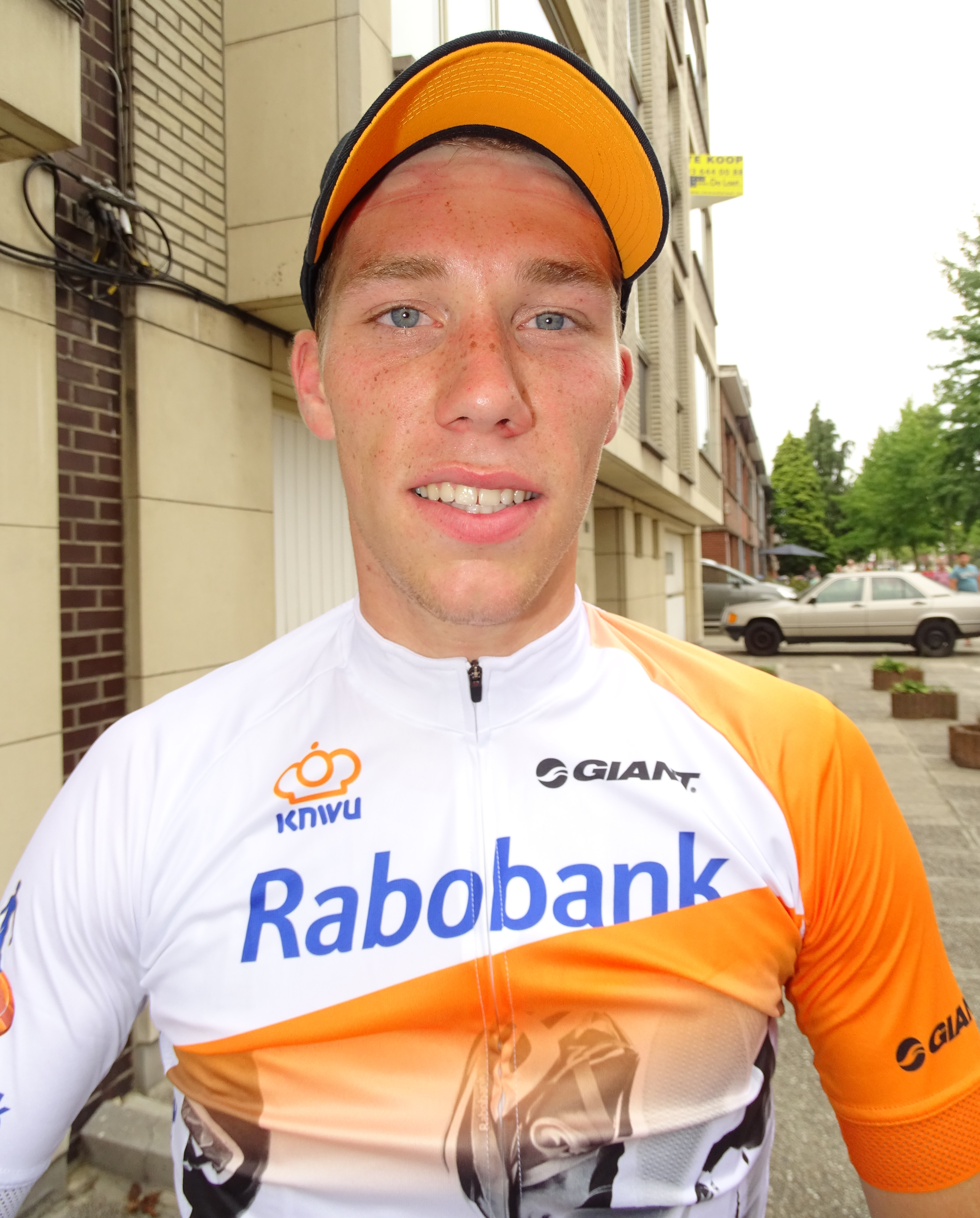
- Godrie in 2015.

Personal information
- Full name: Stan Godrie
- Born: 9 January 1993 (age 33) Breda, Netherlands
- Height: 1.78 m (5 ft 10 in)
- Weight: 74 kg (163 lb)

Cycling career
- Sport: Cycling
- Disciplines: Road; Cyclo-cross
- Role: Rider

Amateur teams
- 2019: Willebrord Wil Vooruit
- 2019–2020: Orange Babies Cycling Team
- 2022: T.W.C Tempo–Hoppenbrouwers–Viro

Professional teams
- 2013–2016: Rabobank Development Team
- 2017–2018: Vérandas Willems–Crelan

Stan Godrie (born 9 January 1993) is a Dutch cyclist. He rode in the men's elite event at the 2016 UCI Cyclo-cross World Championships in Heusden-Zolder.

== Major results ==
=== Road ===
2011
1st Road race, National Junior Road Championships
3rd Overall GP Denmark
9th Road race, UCI Junior Road World Championships
2012
3rd Memorial Van Coningsloo
4th Kernen Omloop Echt-Susteren
2014
1st Stage 4 Kreiz Breizh Elites
2015
1st Road race, National Under-23 Road Championships
2nd Antwerpse Havenpijl
2nd Kernen Omloop Echt-Susteren
3rd Grand Prix de la ville de Pérenchies
9th Paris–Roubaix Espoirs
2016
6th Ronde van Overijssel
6th Arnhem–Veenendaal Classic
7th Grand Prix de la ville de Pérenchies
9th Kernen Omloop Echt-Susteren

=== Cyclo-cross ===
2010–2011
1st Hamme-Zogge, Junior Superprestige
2nd National Junior Championships
10th UCI World Junior Championships
2011–2012
1st Middelkerke, Under-23 Superprestige
3rd UEC European Under-23 Championships
3rd National Under-23 Championships
2012–2013
2nd Gran Premio Mamma E Papa Guerciotti
2014–2015
1st National Under-23 Championships
1st Gran Premio Mamma E Papa Guerciotti
3rd UCI World Under-23 Championships
3rd Centrumcross Surhuisterveen
2015–2016
3rd Marle
3rd Nacht van Woerden
2016–2017
1st Igorre
2nd Asteasuko
2nd Nacht van Woerden
2018–2019
2nd Jingle Cross 1
2021–2022
3rd Oisterwijk
2023–2024
1st Bensheim
3rd Bad Salzdetfurth Day 1
