= 2017 UCI Road World Championships – Men's under-23 road race =

Men's under-23 road race
2017 UCI Road World Championships

Race details
- Dates: 22 September 2017
- Stages: 1
- Distance: 191 km (118.7 mi)
- Winning time: 4h 48' 23"

Medalists
| | Gold | (France) Benoît Cosnefroy (FRA) |
| | Silver | (Germany) Lennard Kämna (GER) |
| | Bronze | (Denmark) Michael Carbel (DEN) |

The Men's under-23 road race of the 2017 UCI Road World Championships was a cycling event that took place on 22 September 2017 in Bergen, Norway. It was the 22nd edition of the event, for which Norwegian rider Kristoffer Halvorsen was the defending champion, having won in 2016. The race was won by French rider Benoît Cosnefroy, who outsprinted German rider Lennard Kämna. 178 riders from 56 nations entered the competition.

== Qualification ==
Qualification was based mainly on the UCI Under-23 Continental Rankings by nations as of 12 August 2018, with varying number on qualifications depending on the continent. In addition to this number, any rider within the top placings of the continent's elite tour ranking that was not already qualified, the outgoing World Champion and the current continental champions were also able to take part.

=== Continental champions ===
| Name | Country | Reason |
|---|---|---|
| Meron Abraham | Eritrea | African Champion |
| Hayato Okamoto | Japan | Asian Champion |
| Lucas Hamilton | Australia | Oceanian Champion |
| Matías Muñoz | Chile | Pan American Champion |

The European champion Casper Pedersen, was not directly eligible, as Denmark had already reached the cap of six qualified riders.

== Final classification ==
Of the race's 178 entrants, 121 riders completed the full distance of 191 kilometres (119 miles).

| Rank | Rider | Nation | Time |
|---|---|---|---|
| 1st place, gold medalist(s) | Benoît Cosnefroy | France | 4h 48' 23" |
| 2nd place, silver medalist(s) | Lennard Kämna | Germany | + 0" |
| 3rd place, bronze medalist(s) | Michael Carbel Svendgaard | Denmark | + 3" |
| 4 | Oliver Wood | United Kingdom | + 3" |
| 5 | Vincenzo Albanese | Italy | + 3" |
| 6 | Damien Touzé | France | + 3" |
| 7 | Max Kanter | Germany | + 3" |
| 8 | Michał Paluta | Poland | + 3" |
| 9 | Mark Downey | Ireland | + 3" |
| 10 | Anders Skaarseth | Norway | + 3" |
| 11 | Nicolás Tivani | Argentina | + 3" |
| 12 | Patrick Müller | Switzerland | + 3" |
| 13 | Stylianos Farantakis | Greece | + 3" |
| 14 | Marc Hirschi | Switzerland | + 3" |
| 15 | Bjorg Lambrecht | Belgium | + 3" |
| 16 | Alexandr Riabushenko | Belarus | + 3" |
| 17 | Wilmar Paredes | Colombia | + 3" |
| 18 | Giovanni Carboni | Italy | + 3" |
| 19 | Emiel Planckaert | Belgium | + 3" |
| 20 | Tadej Pogačar | Slovenia | + 3" |
| 21 | Iván García Cortina | Spain | + 3" |
| 22 | Callum Scotson | Australia | + 3" |
| 23 | Pavel Sivakov | Russia | + 3" |
| 24 | Lucas Eriksson | Sweden | + 3" |
| 25 | Jon Irisarri | Spain | + 3" |
| 26 | Jaakko Hänninen | Finland | + 3" |
| 27 | Rasmus Tiller | Norway | + 3" |
| 28 | Pascal Eenkhoorn | Netherlands | + 3" |
| 29 | Valentin Madouas | France | + 3" |
| 30 | Michael Storer | Australia | + 3" |
