= 2020 Grand Prix La Marseillaise =

2020 UCI Europe Tour

Race details
- Dates: 2 February 2019
- Stages: 1
- Distance: 145.3 km (90.3 mi)
- Winning time: 3h 49' 41"

Results
	Winner	Benoît Cosnefroy (FRA)	(AG2R La Mondiale)
	Second	Valentin Madouas (FRA)	(Groupama–FDJ)
	Third	Tom Devriendt (BEL)	(Circus–Wanty Gobert)

The 2020 Grand Prix La Marseillaise was the 41st edition of the Grand Prix La Marseillaise cycle race. It was held on 2 February 2020 as a category 1.1 race on the 2020 UCI Europe Tour. The race started and finished in Marseille. The race was won by Benoît Cosnefroy of AG2R La Mondiale.

== Teams ==
Fifteen teams of up to seven riders started the race:

UCI WorldTeams

- AG2R La Mondiale
- Groupama–FDJ
- Cofidis
- NTT Pro Cycling

UCI Professional Continental teams

- Nippo–Delko–One Provence
- Total Direct Énergie
- B&B Hotels–Vital Concept
- Sport Vlaanderen–Baloise
- Bingoal–Wallonie Bruxelles
- Arkéa–Samsic
- Circus–Wanty Gobert

UCI Continental teams

- Equipo Kern Pharma
- Natura4Ever–Roubaix–Lille Métropole
- St. Michel–Auber93
- Cambodia Cycling Academy

== Result ==
Result
Rank	Rider	Team	Time
1	Benoît Cosnefroy (FRA)	AG2R La Mondiale	3h 49' 51"
2	Valentin Madouas (FRA)	Groupama–FDJ	+ 0"
3	Tom Devriendt (BEL)	Circus–Wanty Gobert	+ 0"
4	Jesús Herrada (ESP)	Cofidis	+ 0"
5	Edward Planckaert (BEL)	Sport Vlaanderen–Baloise	+ 17"
6	Clément Venturini (FRA)	AG2R La Mondiale	+ 17"
7	Damien Touzé (FRA)	Cofidis	+ 17"
8	Anthony Turgis (FRA)	Total Direct Énergie	+ 17"
9	Edvald Boasson Hagen (NOR)	NTT Pro Cycling	+ 17"
10	Anthony Maldonado (FRA)	St. Michel–Auber93	+ 17"
