= Mikkel Frølich Honoré =

Danish cyclist (born 1997)

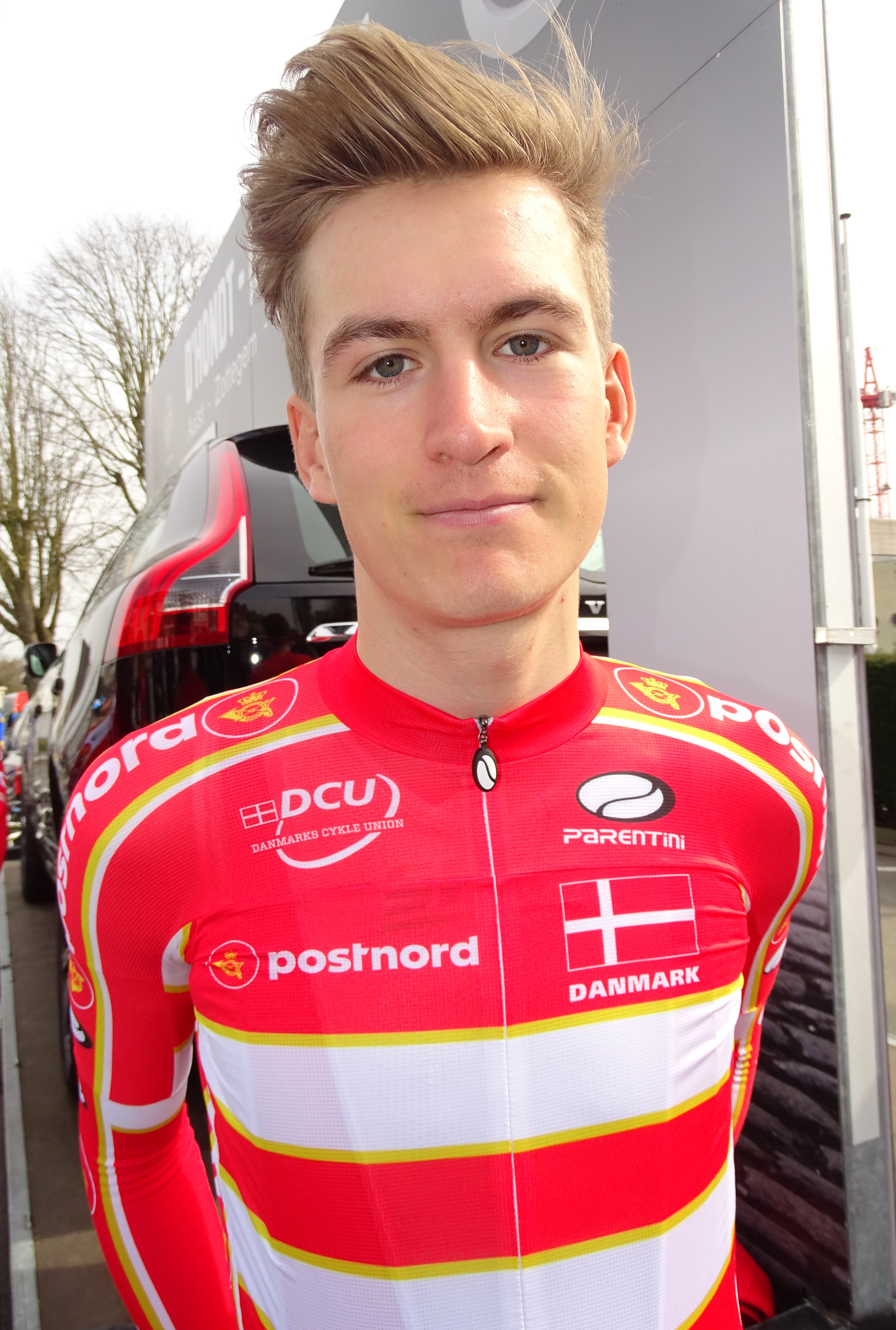
- Honoré in 2016

Personal information
- Full name: Mikkel Frølich Honoré
- Born: 21 January 1997 (age 29) Fredericia, Denmark
- Height: 1.85 m (6 ft 1 in)
- Weight: 68 kg (150 lb)

Cycling career
- Sport: Cycling
- Current team: EF Education–EasyPost
- Discipline: Road
- Role: Rider

Amateur teams
- 2016–2017: Lotto–Soudal U23
- 2018: Quick-Step Floors (stagiaire)

Professional teams
- 2018: Team Virtu Cycling
- 2019–2022: Deceuninck–Quick-Step
- 2023–: EF Education–EasyPost

Mikkel Frølich Honoré (born 21 January 1997) is a Danish cyclist, who currently rides for UCI WorldTeam EF Education–EasyPost. He has most notably won stage five of the 2021 Tour of the Basque Country.

== Major results ==
2014
1st Overall Sint-Martinusprijs Kontich

1st Young rider classification

Summer Youth Olympics

1st Time trial
2nd Team race

2015
1st Overall Sint-Martinusprijs Kontich

1st Stage 1 (TTT)

3rd Overall Trophée Centre Morbihan

1st Stage 1

4th Trofeo Comune di Vertova
7th Paris–Roubaix Juniors
2017
8th Liège–Bastogne–Liège U23
8th Ronde van Vlaanderen Beloften
10th Piccolo Giro di Lombardia
2018
1st Circuit de Wallonie
1st Stage 4 (TTT) Tour de l'Avenir
4th Overall Istrian Spring Trophy
5th Ghent–Wevelgem U23
10th Eschborn–Frankfurt Under-23
2019
10th Overall Adriatica Ionica Race
2020
1st Stage 1b (TTT) Settimana Internazionale di Coppi e Bartali
7th Ardèche Classic
2021 (2 pro wins)
1st Stage 5 Tour of the Basque Country
2nd Overall Settimana Internazionale di Coppi e Bartali

1st Stage 5

2nd Druivenkoers Overijse
3rd Clásica de San Sebastián
3rd Bretagne Classic
3rd La Drôme Classic
4th Overall Tour of Britain
4th Classic Sud-Ardèche
4th Primus Classic
5th Road race, National Road Championships
5th Overall Tour de Pologne
2022
3rd Road race, National Road Championships
6th Grand Prix Cycliste de Québec
2023
1st Mountains classification, Tour Down Under
6th Maryland Cycling Classic
2024
9th Overall Tour de Pologne
2025
4th Overall Tour of Guangxi
6th Clásica Terres de l'Ebre
2026
3rd Memorial Marco Pantani
6th Giro della Toscana

=== Grand Tour general classification results timeline ===
Grand Tour	2019	2020	2021	2022	2023	2024
Giro d'Italia	101	30	81	—	—	62
Tour de France	—	—	—	109	—	—
Vuelta a España	—	—	—	—	—	—

=== Classics results timeline ===
Monument	2019	2020	2021	2022	2023	2024
Milan–San Remo	—	—	—	38	69	—
Tour of Flanders	—	—	—	—	39	—
Paris–Roubaix	—	—	—	—	—	—
Liège–Bastogne–Liège	—	—	50	—	DNF	46
Giro di Lombardia	—	58	—	19	DNF	
Classic	2019	2020	2021	2022	2023	2024
Strade Bianche	—	OTL	—	67	66	47
Amstel Gold Race	92	NH	—	—	DNF	28
La Flèche Wallonne	DNF	—	42	—	—	DNF
Clásica de San Sebastián	40	NH	3	DNF	—	
Hamburg Cyclassics	69	NH	NH	—	—	
Bretagne Classic	48	—	3	16	—	
Grand Prix Cycliste de Québec	54	Not held		6	31	
Grand Prix Cycliste de Montréal	89	Not held		11	DNF	

Legend
—	Did not compete
DNF	Did not finish
OTL	Over time limit
