= Grand Prix du Morbihan =

French one-day road cycling race

Race details
- Date: May or June
- Region: Brittany, France
- English name: Grand Prix of Morbihan
- Local name: Grand Prix du Morbihan (in French)
- Discipline: Road race
- Competition: UCI Europe Tour (2006–2019); UCI ProSeries (2020–present)
- Type: Single-day
- Web site: www.gpmo.bzh

History
- First edition: 1974
- Editions: 49 (as of 2026)
- First winner: Roger Pingeon (FRA)
- Most wins: Benoît Cosnefroy (FRA) (4 wins)
- Most recent: Benoît Cosnefroy (FRA)

Grand Prix du Morbihan is a single-day men's road bicycle race held annually in May around Plumelec, in the region of Brittany, France. Since 2020, the race is organised as a 1.Pro event on the UCI ProSeries, also being part of the French Road Cycling Cup.

A women's race, the Grand Prix du Morbihan Féminin, has been held the same day since 2011.

== Name of the race ==
- 1988–2000: A Travers le Morbihan
- 1988–2000: A Travers le Morbihan
- 2001–2019: Grand Prix de Plumelec-Morbihan

== Winners ==
Year	Country	Rider	Team
1974	France	Roger Pingeon	Jobo–Lejeune
1975	France	Georges Talbourdet	Gan–Mercier–Hutchinson
1976	France	Robert Alban	Gan–Mercier–Hutchinson
1977	France	André Chalmel	Gitane–Campagnolo
1978	France	Raymond Martin	Miko–Mercier–Vivagel
1979	No race due to financial reasons		
1980	France	Christian Muselet	La Redoute–Motobécane
1981	France	Robert Alban	La Redoute–Motobécane
1982	France	Fabien De Vooght	Wolber–Spidel
1983	France	Laurent Fignon	Renault–Elf
1984	France	Pierre Bazzo	COOP–Hoonved
1985	France	Marc Madiot	Renault–Elf
1986	France	Gilbert Duclos-Lassalle	Peugeot–Shell
1987	Denmark	Johnny Weltz	Fagor–MBK
1988	France	Frédéric Brun	Z–Peugeot
1989	No race due to financial reasons		
1990	Belgium	Johan Museeuw	Lotto–Superclub
1991	France	Bruno Cornillet	Z
1992	Belgium	Peter De Clercq	Lotto–Mavic–MBK
1993	Germany	Marcel Wüst	Novemail–Histor–Laser Computer
1994	Belgium	Peter De Clercq	Lotto
1995	France	Francis Moreau	GAN
1996	Belgium	Johan Capiot	Collstrop–Lystex
1997	France	Christophe Agnolutto	Casino
1998	France	Laurent Desbiens	Cofidis
1999	France	Patrice Halgand	Festina–Lotus
2000	France	Patrice Halgand	Jean Delatour
2001	France	Gilles Maignan	AG2R Prévoyance
2002	France	Laurent Lefèvre	Jean Delatour
2003	France	Nicolas Vogondy	FDJeux.com
2004	France	Thomas Voeckler	Brioches La Boulangère
2005	No race due to financial reasons		
2006	France	Cédric Hervé	Bretagne–Jean Floc'h
2007	Australia	Simon Gerrans	AG2R Prévoyance
2008	France	Thomas Voeckler	Bouygues Télécom
2009	France	Jérémie Galland	Besson Chaussures–Sojasun
2010	Australia	Wesley Sulzberger	Française des Jeux
2011	France	Sylvain Georges	BigMat–Auber 93
2012	France	Julien Simon	Saur–Sojasun
2013	France	Samuel Dumoulin	Ag2r–La Mondiale
2014	France	Julien Simon	Cofidis
2015	France	Alexis Vuillermoz	AG2R La Mondiale
2016	France	Samuel Dumoulin	AG2R La Mondiale
2017	France	Alexis Vuillermoz	AG2R La Mondiale
2018	Italy	Andrea Pasqualon	Wanty–Groupe Gobert
2019	France	Benoît Cosnefroy	AG2R La Mondiale
2020	No race due to the COVID-19 pandemic in France		
2021	Belgium	Arne Marit	Sport Vlaanderen–Baloise
2022	France	Julien Simon	Team TotalEnergies
2023	Belgium	Arnaud De Lie	Lotto–Dstny
2024	France	Benoît Cosnefroy	Decathlon–AG2R La Mondiale
2025	France	Benoît Cosnefroy	Decathlon–AG2R La Mondiale
2026	France	Benoît Cosnefroy	UAE Team Emirates XRG

=== Wins per country ===
Wins	Country
38	France
6	Belgium
2	Australia
1	Denmark; Germany; Italy
