= Alexandre Delettre =

French cyclist (born 1997)

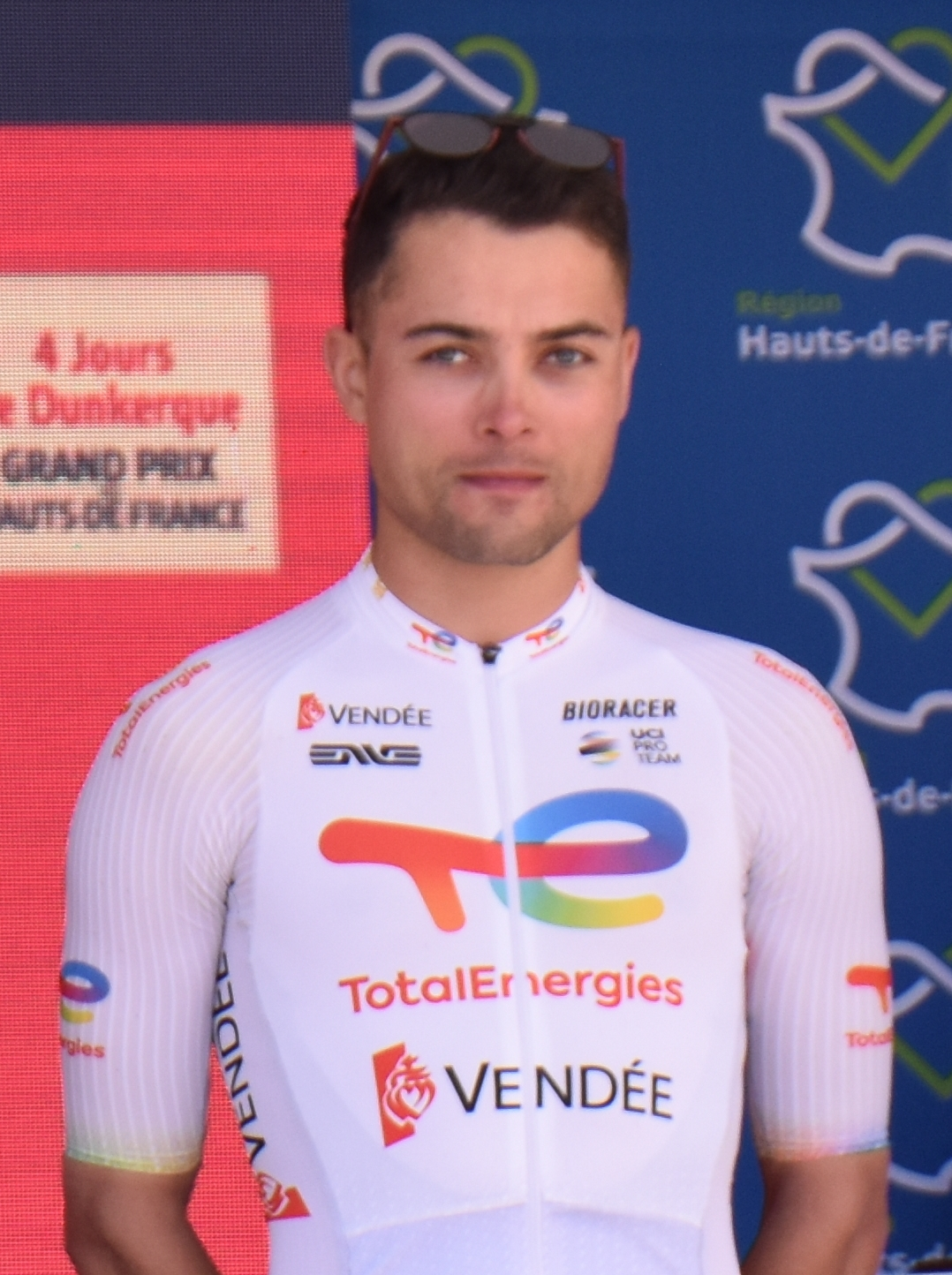
- Delettre at the 2025 Four Days of Dunkirk

Personal information
- Born: 25 October 1997 (age 28) Gonesse, France
- Height: 1.71 m (5 ft 7 in)
- Weight: 62 kg (137 lb; 9 st 11 lb)

Cycling career
- Sport: Cycling
- Current team: Team TotalEnergies
- Discipline: Road
- Role: Rider
- Rider type: Puncheur

Amateur teams
- 2015: M'Santé Cyclisme
- 2016–2018: Vélo Club La Pomme Marseille
- 2019–2020: Vélo Club Villefranche Beaujolais

Professional teams
- 2019: Delko–Marseille Provence (stagiaire)
- 2021: Delko
- 2022–2023: Cofidis
- 2024: St. Michel–Mavic–Auber93
- 2025–: Team TotalEnergies

Alexandre Delettre (born 25 October 1997) is a French professional racing cyclist, who currently rides for UCI ProTeam Team TotalEnergies. After riding for Delko as a stagiaire for the latter half of 2019, he signed a two-year neo-pro contract with them in 2021, joining from amateur team Vélo Club Villefranche Beaujolais.

In his first race as a full professional, Delettre made the breakaway on stage 1 of the 2021 Étoile de Bessèges and took the lead in the mountains classification, which he managed to hold on to for the rest of the race.

== Major results ==
2015
1st Stage 3 Ain'Ternational-Rhône Alpes-Valromey Tour
2019
4th Polynormande
2021
1st Mountains classification, Étoile de Bessèges
6th Polynormande
8th Classic Loire Atlantique
2023
5th Gooikse Pijl
6th Tour de Vendée
8th Polynormande
2024
2nd Boucles de l'Aulne
3rd Paris–Camembert
3rd Route Adélie
4th Overall Tour des Alpes-Maritimes
5th Overall Four Days of Dunkirk
5th Classic Loire Atlantique
6th Overall Région Pays de la Loire Tour
7th Le Samyn
10th Polynormande
2025
2nd Overall Tour du Limousin
2nd Memorial Marco Pantani
4th Road race, National Road Championships
5th Coppa Sabatini
5th GP Industria & Artigianato di Larciano
5th Trofeo Matteotti
7th Overall Four Days of Dunkirk
9th Super 8 Classic
2026
4th Overall Tour du Limousin
7th Coppa Sabatini
9th Bretagne Classic
10th Circuit Franco-Belge
10th Japan Cup

=== Grand Tour general classification results timeline ===
Grand Tour	2023
Giro d'Italia	89
Tour de France	—
Vuelta a España	—
