= Benoît Cosnefroy =

French cyclist

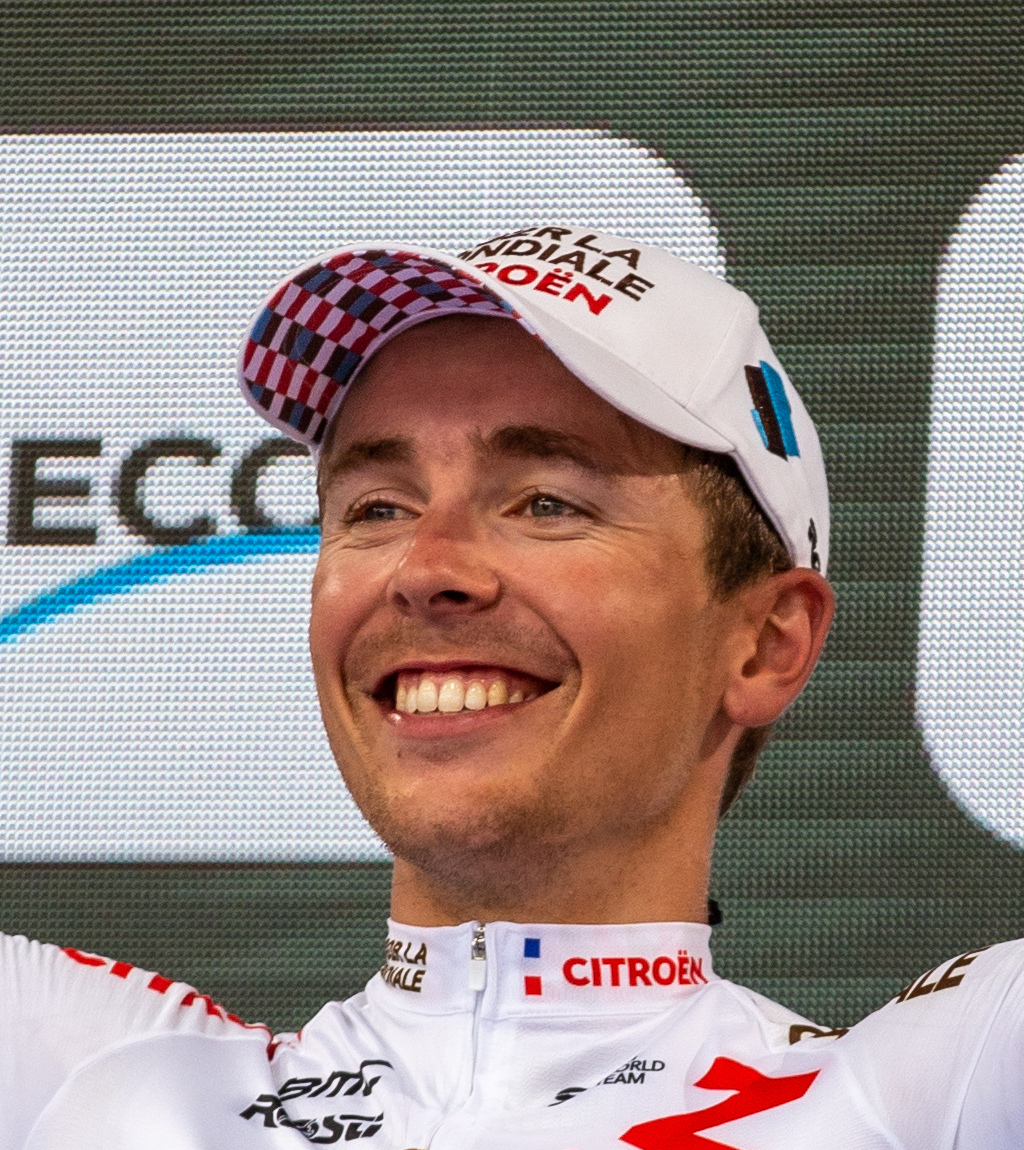
- Benoît Cosnefroy, GP de Québec, Sept 2022

Personal information
- Full name: Benoît Cosnefroy
- Nickname: Cherbourg Cheetah
- Born: 17 October 1995 (age 31) Cherbourg, France
- Height: 1.76 m (5 ft 9 in)
- Weight: 64 kg (141 lb)

Cycling career
- Sport: Cycling
- Current team: UAE Team Emirates XRG
- Discipline: Road
- Role: Rider
- Rider type: Puncheur

Amateur teams
- 2014: Bricquebec Cotentin
- 2015–2017: Chambéry CF

Professional teams
- 2017–2025: AG2R La Mondiale
- 2026–: UAE Team Emirates XRG

Major wins
- Stage races Boucles de la Mayenne (2026) One-day races and Classics Bretagne Classic (2021) GP de Québec (2022) Brabantse Pijl (2024) Coppa Sabatini (2026) GP du Morbihan (2019, 2024, 2025, 2026)
Medal record
Representing France
Men's road bicycle racing
World Championships
Gold medal – first place	2017 Bergen	Under-23 road race
European Championships
Silver medal – second place	2017 Herning	Under-23 road race
Bronze medal – third place	2021 Trento	Elite road race

Benoît Cosnefroy (French pronunciation: [bənwa kɔsnəfʁwa]; born 17 October 1995 in Cherbourg) is a French cyclist who currently rides for UCI WorldTeam UAE Team Emirates XRG.

== Career ==
=== Junior and amateur years ===
Cosnefroy was born into a family passionate about cycling. His grandfather was the organizer of a race in the English Channel, while his father often took him to see bike races during his youth. He first started competing at the age of 8 with the Union Concorde Bricquebetaise. In 2011, he joined the Pôle Espoir de Caen, where he stayed for three years. He took his first victory at the age of 16 in the Prix Louis-Cosnefroy, a race held as a tribute to his great-great-grandfather Louis Cosnefroy. However, during his years in the junior category, Cosnefroy saw little success. In 2014, he moved up to the under-23 category, joining team Bricquebec Cotentin. The following year he joined Chambéry CF, the development team of AG2R La Mondiale after hitchhiking along the nine-hour drive to apply. This year, he achieved modest success in amateur and under-23 races. In 2016, he began to obtain more results, notably placing second by half a wheel length to Valentin Madouas at the national amateur road race championships, and second to Paul Ourselin in the under-23 national championship. He joined AG2R La Mondiale as a stagiaire in August, placing 4th in the road race at the UEC European Under-23 Road Championships.

The 2017 season was a major turning point in Cosnefory's career, and was his final year competing as an amateur. He took his first elite category win in May: stage 2 of the Rhône-Alpes Isère Tour, holding off the peloton for almost 160 kilometers. The same month, he placed sixth in the Grand Prix de Plumelec-Morbihan, his first top ten in a 1.1 or higher category race.

=== Professional career ===
Cosnefroy turned professional in August 2017 with UCI WorldTeam AG2R La Mondiale. Five days after joining the team, he won the silver medal in the road race at the UEC European Under-23 Road Championships. His success continued, winning the Grand Prix d'Isbergues in September, followed by the under-23 road race at the UCI Road World Championships five days later.

Cosnefroy completed his first full professional season in 2018, placing third in Paris–Tours and ninth in the Bretagne Classic Ouest-France, his first top ten in a UCI World Tour race.

Cosnefroy took five victories in 2019, all in France: the overall classification and third stage of the Tour du Limousin as well as the one-day races Grand Prix de Plumelec-Morbihan, Paris–Camembert and Polynormande. He was named in the startlist for the 2019 Tour de France, which was his first Grand Tour. He placed 113th overall.

At the beginning of 2020, he won the Grand Prix La Marseillaise and the Étoile de Bessèges before the season stopped due to the COVID-19 pandemic. As soon as racing resumed, he won the fourth and final stage of the Route d'Occitanie ahead of Bauke Mollema, Thibaut Pinot and Egan Bernal. He was selected for the French team for the UEC European Road Championships held in Plouay, where he finished tenth in the road race. In the 2020 Tour de France, he led the mountains classification and wore the polka dot jersey for 15 consecutive stages; he ultimately finished sixth in the final classification standings. He ended the season strongly, placing second to Marc Hirschi in the La Flèche Wallonne, as well as third in De Brabantse Pijl and second in Paris–Tours.

On 22 May 2021, he won the Tour du Finistère and three months later he won his first World Tour race: the Bretagne Classic ahead of Julian Alaphilippe and Mikkel Honoré. On 12 September, he won the bronze medal at the European Championships behind Sonny Colbrelli and Remco Evenepoel.

The following spring, he took second place at the Amstel Gold Race and the Brabantse Pijl. In September, he won his second World Tour race: the Grand Prix Cycliste de Québec with a 2 kilometer solo.

He took no wins in 2023, but was awarded the Combativity award for stage four of the Tour de France.

Cosnefroy started 2024 on strong form, winning stage 2 and the overall title of the Tour des Alpes-Maritimes in February, followed up with a sixth-place finish at Strade Bianche in early March. Three weeks later he won Paris–Camembert, followed by his first win at the Brabantse Pijl after having been on the podium three times before. In early May, he won the Grand Prix du Morbihan.

== Major results ==
2016
2nd Road race, National Under-23 Road Championships
2nd Road race, National Amateur Road Championships
4th Road race, UEC European Under-23 Road Championships
5th Tour de Berne
6th Overall Rhône-Alpes Isère Tour
10th Piccolo Giro di Lombardia
2017 (1 pro win)
1st Road race, UCI Road World Under-23 Championships
1st Grand Prix d'Isbergues
1st Stage 2 Rhône-Alpes Isère Tour
2nd Road race, UEC European Under-23 Road Championships
2nd Road race, National Under-23 Road Championships
6th Grand Prix de Plumelec-Morbihan
6th Tour de Berne
2018
3rd Paris–Tours
9th Bretagne Classic
9th Coppa Sabatini
9th La Roue Tourangelle
10th Cholet-Pays de Loire
2019 (5)
1st Overall Tour du Limousin

1st Young rider classification
1st Stage 3

1st Grand Prix de Plumelec-Morbihan
1st Paris–Camembert
1st Polynormande
4th Tour de Vendée
7th Bretagne Classic
10th Grand Prix Cycliste de Québec
2020 (3)
1st Overall Étoile de Bessèges
1st Grand Prix La Marseillaise
1st Stage 4 Route d'Occitanie
2nd La Flèche Wallonne
2nd Paris–Tours
3rd Brabantse Pijl
5th La Drôme Classic
10th Road race, UEC European Road Championships
Tour de France

Held after Stages 2–16
Combativity award Stage 2

2021 (3)
1st Bretagne Classic
1st Tour du Finistère
1st Tour du Jura
2nd Polynormande
3rd Road race, UEC European Road Championships
4th Tre Valli Varesine
8th Brabantse Pijl
2022 (1)
1st Grand Prix Cycliste de Québec
2nd Overall Circuit de la Sarthe
2nd Overall Boucles de la Mayenne
2nd Amstel Gold Race
2nd Brabantse Pijl
3rd La Drôme Classic
5th Grand Prix La Marseillaise
5th Tre Valli Varesine
6th Overall Tour du Limousin
2023
2nd Overall Tour du Limousin
3rd Brabantse Pijl
7th Grand Prix of Aargau Canton
8th Overall Boucles de la Mayenne
8th Trofeo Laigueglia
Combativity award Stage 4 Tour de France
2024 (7)
1st Overall Tour des Alpes-Maritimes

1st Points classification
1st Stage 2

1st Brabantse Pijl
1st Grand Prix du Morbihan
1st Paris–Camembert
1st Tour du Finistère
2nd Overall Boucles de la Mayenne

1st Prologue

4th Overall Région Pays de la Loire Tour
4th La Flèche Wallonne
6th Strade Bianche
9th La Drôme Classic
2025 (1)
1st Grand Prix du Morbihan
2nd Boucles de l'Aulne
5th Overall Boucles de la Mayenne
2026 (5)
1st Overall Boucles de la Mayenne

1st Stage 2

1st Coppa Sabatini
1st Grand Prix du Morbihan
2nd Overall Tour de Hongrie

1st Stage 2

3rd Amstel Gold Race
3rd Brabantse Pijl
3rd Giro del Veneto
3rd Clásica Jaén Paraíso Interior
3rd Trofeo Matteotti
4th La Flèche Wallonne
4th Grand Prix de Wallonie
6th Tro-Bro Léon
10th Veneto Classic

=== Grand Tour general classification results timeline ===
Grand Tour	2019	2020	2021	2022	2023
Giro d'Italia	—	—	—	—	—
Tour de France	113	116	107	91	101
Vuelta a España	—	—	—	—	—

=== Classics results timeline ===
Monument	2016	2017	2018	2019	2020	2021	2022	2023	2024	2025	2026
Milan–San Remo	—	—	—	—	—	—	15	22	20	—	—
Tour of Flanders	—	—	—	—	—	—	—	16	—	—	DNF
Paris–Roubaix	Has not contested during his career										
Liège–Bastogne–Liège	—	—	DNF	45	18	48	24	54	16	—	41
Giro di Lombardia	—	—	—	—	—	DNF	—	—	—	—	
Classic	2016	2017	2018	2019	2020	2021	2022	2023	2024	2025	2026
Strade Bianche	—	—	—	—	—	—	29	—	6	—	—
Brabantse Pijl	—	—	—	—	3	8	2	3	1	—	3
Amstel Gold Race	—	—	48	44	NH	—	2	21	16	—	3
La Flèche Wallonne	—	—	DNF	12	2	18	13	—	4	—	4
Bretagne Classic	—	—	9	7	—	1	20	27	26	—	
Grand Prix Cycliste de Québec	—	—	25	10	NH	NH	1	54	—	—	
Grand Prix Cycliste de Montréal	—	—	24	17	NH	NH	20	27	—	—	
Tre Valli Varesine	—	—	—	—	NH	4	5	60	—	—	
Paris–Tours	96	155	3	—	2	—	83	—	—	—	

Legend
—	Did not compete
DNF	Did not finish
NH	Not held
