= 2020 La Flèche Wallonne =

Cycling race

2020 UCI World Tour, race 15 of 21

Race details
- Dates: 30 September 2020
- Distance: 202 km (125.5 mi)
- Winning time: 4h 49'17"

Results
	Winner	Marc Hirschi (SUI)	(Team Sunweb)
	Second	Benoît Cosnefroy (FRA)	(AG2R La Mondiale)
	Third	Michael Woods (CAN)	(EF Pro Cycling)

The 2020 La Flèche Wallonne was a road cycling one-day race that was to have taken place on 22 April 2020 in Belgium, but was postponed due to the COVID-19 pandemic. It was rescheduled to 30 September, and it was the 84th edition of La Flèche Wallonne and part of the 2020 UCI World Tour. It was won by Marc Hirschi.

== Teams ==
The teams that participated in the race were:

UCI WorldTeams

- AG2R La Mondiale
- Astana
- Bahrain–McLaren
- Bora–Hansgrohe
- CCC Team
- Cofidis
- Deceuninck–Quick-Step
- EF Pro Cycling
- Groupama–FDJ
- Israel Start-Up Nation
- Lotto–Soudal
- Mitchelton–Scott
- Movistar Team
- NTT Pro Cycling
- Ineos Grenadiers
- Team Jumbo–Visma
- Team Sunweb
- Trek–Segafredo
- UAE Team Emirates

UCI Professional Continental teams

- Alpecin–Fenix
- Arkéa–Samsic
- Bingoal–Wallonie Bruxelles
- Circus–Wanty Gobert
- Sport Vlaanderen–Baloise
- Total Direct Énergie

== Result ==
Result
Rank	Rider	Team	Time
1	Marc Hirschi (SUI)	Team Sunweb	4h 49' 17"
2	Benoît Cosnefroy (FRA)	AG2R La Mondiale	+ 0"
3	Michael Woods (CAN)	EF Pro Cycling	+ 0"
4	Warren Barguil (FRA)	Arkéa–Samsic	+ 0"
5	Dan Martin (IRL)	Israel Start-Up Nation	+ 0"
6	Michał Kwiatkowski (POL)	Ineos Grenadiers	+ 0"
7	Patrick Konrad (AUT)	Bora–Hansgrohe	+ 5"
8	Richie Porte (AUS)	Trek–Segafredo	+ 5"
9	Tadej Pogačar (SLO)	UAE Team Emirates	+ 5"
10	Simon Geschke (GER)	CCC Team	+ 10"
