= Clément Venturini =

French cyclist

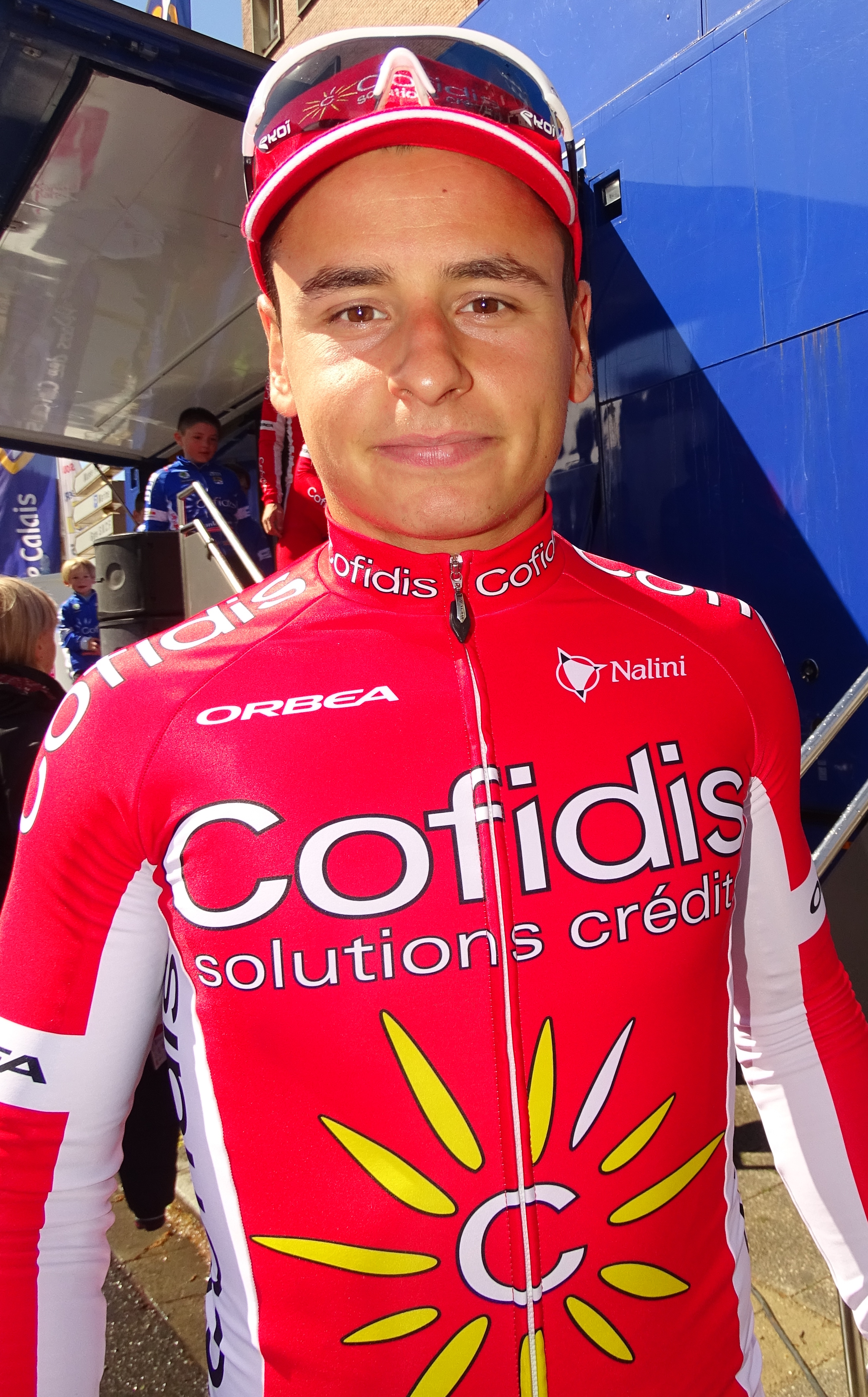
- Venturini in 2015.

Personal information
- Born: 16 October 1993 (age 32) Villeurbanne
- Height: 1.65 m (5 ft 5 in)
- Weight: 60 kg (132 lb)

Cycling career
- Sport: Cycling
- Current team: Unibet Rose Rockets
- Disciplines: Road; Cyclo-cross
- Role: Rider
- Rider type: Sprinter

Amateur teams
- 2010–2011: Vulco-VC Vaulx-en-Velin Junior
- 2012–2013: Vulco-VC Vaulx-en-Velin

Professional teams
- 2013: Cofidis (stagiaire)
- 2014–2017: Cofidis
- 2018–2023: AG2R La Mondiale
- 2024–2025: Arkéa–B&B Hotels
- 2026-: Unibet Rose Rockets

Major wins
- Cyclo-cross National Championships (2017, 2019, 2020, 2021, 2023, 2024) Road Stage races Four Days of Dunkirk (2017)
Medal record
Men's cyclo-cross
Representing France
World Championships
Gold medal – first place	2011 Sankt Wendel	Junior

Clément Venturini (born 16 October 1993 in Villeurbanne) is a French cyclist, who currently rides for UCI ProTeam Unibet Rose Rockets. In 2011, he won the UCI Junior World Cyclo-cross Championship. In May 2018, he was named in the startlist for the 2018 Giro d'Italia. In August 2019, he was named in the startlist for the 2019 Vuelta a España. In August 2020, he was named in the start list for the 2020 Tour de France. In March 2026, he won the Roue Tourangelle.

== Major results ==
=== Cyclo-cross ===
2010–2011
1st UCI World Junior Championships
UCI Junior World Cup

1st Pontchâteau

2011–2012
Under-23 Challenge de la France

2nd Lignières-en-Berry
2nd Rodez

3rd National Under-23 Championships
2012–2013
Under-23 Challenge National

1st Pontchâteau
1st Saverne

2nd National Under-23 Championships
2013–2014
1st National Under-23 Championships
1st Rennaz
Under-23 Challenge National

1st Saint-Etienne-lès-Remiremont
1st Quelneuc
1st Flamanville

2014–2015
1st Overall EKZ CrossTour

1st Hittnau
2nd Dielsdorf

1st Marle
1st Sion-Valais
2nd Overall Coupe de France

1st Sisteron
3rd Besançon
3rd Lanarvily

2nd National Championships
Under-23 Superprestige

3rd Diegem

4th UCI World Under-23 Championships
2015–2016
1st Overall Coupe de France

1st Albi
1st Quelneuc
1st Flamanville

EKZ CrossTour

1st Dielsdorf

1st La Mézière
1st Marle
1st Pierric
1st Steinmaur
2nd National Championships
2016–2017
1st National Championships
1st Overall Coupe de France

1st Bagnoles de l'Orne
1st Nommay
2nd Erôme Gervans

EKZ CrossTour

1st Aigle

1st La Mézière
Soudal Classics

2nd Hasselt

2017–2018
Coupe de France

1st Flamanville

1st Sion-Valais
1st Nyon
Soudal Classics

2nd Leuven

2018–2019
1st National Championships
2nd La Meziere
2019–2020
1st National Championships
1st Troyes
1st Coulounieix-Chamiers
2020–2021
1st National Championships
2nd Troyes
2021–2022
5th UCI World Championships
2022–2023
1st National Championships
1st Boulzicourt
Copa de España

2nd Xativa
2nd Valencia

UCI World Cup

4th Besançon

2023–2024
1st National Championships
Copa de España

2nd Xàtiva
2nd Valencia

2nd Auxerre

=== Road ===
2014
Rhône-Alpes Isère Tour

1st Points classification
1st Stage 4

2015
2nd La Roue Tourangelle
2016 (1 pro win)
1st Stage 2 Tour of Austria
1st Points classification, Rhône-Alpes Isère Tour
2nd Route Adélie
3rd Boucles de l'Aulne
6th La Roue Tourangelle
6th Grand Prix de Denain
8th Grand Prix d'Isbergues
2017 (2)
1st Overall Four Days of Dunkirk

1st Points classification
1st Young rider classification

1st Stage 6 Tour of Austria
3rd Overall Boucles de la Mayenne
10th Route Adélie
2018 (1)
1st Stage 2 Route d'Occitanie
5th La Roue Tourangelle
2019
3rd Route Adélie
7th Grand Prix La Marseillaise
2020
4th Road race, National Championships
4th Le Samyn
5th Overall Tour de Wallonie
6th Grand Prix La Marseillaise
7th Clásica de Almería
2022
5th Polynormande
6th Tour du Doubs
7th Grand Prix du Morbihan
7th La Roue Tourangelle
8th Classic Loire Atlantique
2023
5th Grand Prix du Morbihan
5th Boucles de l'Aulne
5th Polynormande
5th Tour de Vendée
6th Brussels Cycling Classic
6th Tro-Bro Léon
10th Overall Boucles de la Mayenne
10th Paris–Chauny
2024
2nd Tro-Bro Léon
2nd Paris–Camembert
4th Grand Prix du Morbihan
5th Overall Région Pays de la Loire Tour
5th La Roue Tourangelle
6th Overall Tour du Limousin
7th Tour du Finistère
9th Bretagne Classic
2025
3rd Grand Prix du Morbihan
3rd Boucles de l'Aulne
4th La Roue Tourangelle
4th Route Adélie de Vitré
4th Tour de Vendée
5th Paris–Chauny
8th Grand Prix d'Isbergues
9th Tour du Doubs
2026 (1)
1st La Roue Tourangelle
2nd Coppa Sabatini
7th Circuit Franco-Belge
8th Tro-Bro Léon
10th La Drôme Classic
10th Grand Prix de Wallonie

==== Grand Tour general classification results timeline ====
Grand Tour	2018	2019	2020	2021	2022	2023	2024	2025
Giro d'Italia	104	—	—	—	—	—	—	—
Tour de France	—	—	104	—	—	—	—	43
Vuelta a España	—	90	—	97	—	—	—	—

Legend
—	Did not compete
DNF	Did not finish
