= 2020 Étoile de Bessèges =

2020 UCI Europe Tour

Race details
- Dates: 5–9 February 2020
- Stages: 5
- Distance: 614.0 km (381.5 mi)
- Winning time: 14h 39' 57"

Results
Jersey awarded to the overall winner	Winner	Benoît Cosnefroy (FRA)	(AG2R La Mondiale)
	Second	Alberto Bettiol (ITA)	(EF Pro Cycling)
	Third	Alexys Brunel (FRA)	(Groupama–FDJ)
Jersey awarded to the points classification winner	Points	Magnus Cort (DEN)	(EF Pro Cycling)
Jersey awarded to the mountains classification winner	Mountains	Georg Zimmermann (GER)	(CCC Team)
Jersey awarded to the young rider classification winner	Young rider	Alexys Brunel (FRA)	(Groupama–FDJ)
	Team	EF Pro Cycling	

The 2020 Étoile de Bessèges (transl. Star of Bessèges) was a road cycling stage race that took place between 5 and 9 February 2020. The race is rated as a 2.1 event as part of the 2020 UCI Europe Tour, and was the 50th edition of the Étoile de Bessèges cycling race.

== Teams ==
Twenty teams were invited to the race. Of these teams, seven are UCI WorldTour teams, eight are UCI Professional Continental teams, and five are UCI Continental teams. While NTT Pro Cycling entered six riders, every other team submitted seven. Of the 139 riders who started the race, 114 riders finished.

UCI WorldTeams

- AG2R La Mondiale
- CCC Team
- Cofidis
- EF Pro Cycling
- Groupama–FDJ
- NTT Pro Cycling
- Trek–Segafredo

UCI Professional Continental Teams

- Alpecin–Fenix
- Arkéa–Samsic
- Bingoal–Wallonie Bruxelles
- B&B Hotels–Vital Concept
- Circus–Wanty Gobert
- Nippo–Delko–One Provence
- Sport Vlaanderen–Baloise
- Total Direct Énergie

UCI Continental Teams

- Beltrami TSA–Marchiol
- Cambodia Cycling Academy
- Equipo Kern Pharma
- Natura4Ever–Roubaix–Lille Métropole
- St. Michel–Auber93

== Route ==
Stage characteristics and winners
Stage	Date	Course	Distance	Type	Stage winner
1	5 February	Bellegarde to Bellegarde	139.56 km (86.72 mi)	Flat stage	Alexys Brunel (FRA)
2	6 February	Milhaud to Poulx	158.31 km (98.37 mi)	Hilly stage	Magnus Cort (DEN)
3	7 February	Bessèges to Bessèges	162.24 km (100.81 mi)	Hilly stage	Dries De Bondt (BEL)
4	8 February	Pont du Gard to Mont Bouquet	143.01 km (88.86 mi)	Mountain stage	Ben O'Connor (AUS)
5	9 February	Alès to Alès	10.88 km (6.76 mi)	Individual time trial	Alberto Bettiol (ITA)
Total		614.0 km (381.5 mi)			

== Stages ==
=== Stage 1 ===
5 February 2020 – Bellegarde to Bellegarde, 139.56 km (86.72 mi)

Stage 1 Result
Rank	Rider	Team	Time
1	Alexys Brunel (FRA)	Groupama–FDJ	3h 20' 43"
2	Benoît Cosnefroy (FRA)	AG2R La Mondiale	+ 1"
3	Edward Planckaert (BEL)	Sport Vlaanderen–Baloise	+ 3"
4	Alex Kirsch (LUX)	Trek–Segafredo	+ 5"
5	Scott Thwaites (GBR)	Alpecin–Fenix	+ 8"
6	Kevin Geniets (LUX)	Groupama–FDJ	+ 8"
7	Gijs van Hoecke (BEL)	CCC Team	+ 8"
8	Lilian Calmejane (FRA)	Total Direct Énergie	+ 8"
9	Arthur Vichot (FRA)	B&B Hotels–Vital Concept	+ 8"
10	Flavien Maurelet (FRA)	St. Michel–Auber93	+ 13"

General classification after Stage 1
Rank	Rider	Team	Time
1	Alexys Brunel (FRA)	Groupama–FDJ	3h 20' 32"
2	Benoît Cosnefroy (FRA)	AG2R La Mondiale	+ 3"
3	Edward Planckaert (BEL)	Sport Vlaanderen–Baloise	+ 10"
4	Alex Kirsch (LUX)	Trek–Segafredo	+ 16"
5	Kevin Geniets (LUX)	Groupama–FDJ	+ 17"
6	Scott Thwaites (GBR)	Alpecin–Fenix	+ 19"
7	Gijs van Hoecke (BEL)	CCC Team	+ 19"
8	Lilian Calmejane (FRA)	Total Direct Énergie	+ 19"
9	Arthur Vichot (FRA)	B&B Hotels–Vital Concept	+ 19"
10	Flavien Maurelet (FRA)	St. Michel–Auber93	+ 24"

=== Stage 2 ===
6 February 2020 – Milhaud to Poulx, 158.31 km (98.37 mi)

Stage 2 Result
Rank	Rider	Team	Time
1	Magnus Cort (DEN)	EF Pro Cycling	3h 47' 46"
2	Edvald Boasson Hagen (NOR)	NTT Pro Cycling	+ 0"
3	Tom Devriendt (BEL)	Circus–Wanty Gobert	+ 0"
4	Anthony Turgis (FRA)	Total Direct Énergie	+ 0"
5	Emiel Vermeulen (BEL)	Natura4Ever–Roubaix–Lille Métropole	+ 0"
6	Alexander Krieger (GER)	Alpecin–Fenix	+ 0"
7	Pierre Barbier (FRA)	Nippo–Delko–One Provence	+ 0"
8	Clément Venturini (FRA)	AG2R La Mondiale	+ 0"
9	Roy Jans (BEL)	Alpecin–Fenix	+ 0"
10	Biniam Girmay (ERI)	Nippo–Delko–One Provence	+ 0"

General classification after Stage 2
Rank	Rider	Team	Time
1	Alexys Brunel (FRA)	Groupama–FDJ	7h 08' 18"
2	Benoît Cosnefroy (FRA)	AG2R La Mondiale	+ 3"
3	Edward Planckaert (BEL)	Sport Vlaanderen–Baloise	+ 10"
4	Alex Kirsch (LUX)	Trek–Segafredo	+ 16"
5	Kevin Geniets (LUX)	Groupama–FDJ	+ 17"
6	Gijs van Hoecke (BEL)	CCC Team	+ 19"
7	Lilian Calmejane (FRA)	Total Direct Énergie	+ 19"
8	Scott Thwaites (GBR)	Alpecin–Fenix	+ 19"
9	Arthur Vichot (FRA)	B&B Hotels–Vital Concept	+ 19"
10	Flavien Maurelet (FRA)	St. Michel–Auber93	+ 24"

=== Stage 3 ===
7 February 2020 – Bessèges to Bessèges, 166.24 km (103.30 mi)

Stage 3 Result
Rank	Rider	Team	Time
1	Dries De Bondt (BEL)	Alpecin–Fenix	3h 54' 56"
2	Georg Zimmermann (GER)	CCC Team	+ 0"
3	Magnus Cort (DEN)	EF Pro Cycling	+ 2"
4	Roy Jans (BEL)	Alpecin–Fenix	+ 2"
5	Clément Venturini (FRA)	AG2R La Mondiale	+ 2"
6	Emiel Vermeulen (BEL)	Natura4Ever–Roubaix–Lille Métropole	+ 2"
7	Tom Devriendt (BEL)	Circus–Wanty Gobert	+ 2"
8	Lionel Taminiaux (BEL)	Bingoal–Wallonie Bruxelles	+ 0"
9	Robbe Ghys (BEL)	Sport Vlaanderen–Baloise	+ 0"
10	Nicolò Parisini (ITA)	Beltrami TSA–Marchiol	+ 0"

General classification after Stage 3
Rank	Rider	Team	Time
1	Alexys Brunel (FRA)	Groupama–FDJ	11h 03' 16"
2	Benoît Cosnefroy (FRA)	AG2R La Mondiale	+ 3"
3	Edward Planckaert (BEL)	Sport Vlaanderen–Baloise	+ 10"
4	Alex Kirsch (LUX)	Trek–Segafredo	+ 16"
5	Kevin Geniets (LUX)	Groupama–FDJ	+ 17"
6	Scott Thwaites (GBR)	Alpecin–Fenix	+ 19"
7	Gijs van Hoecke (BEL)	CCC Team	+ 19"
8	Lilian Calmejane (FRA)	Total Direct Énergie	+ 19"
9	Arthur Vichot (FRA)	B&B Hotels–Vital Concept	+ 19"
10	Flavien Maurelet (FRA)	St. Michel–Auber93	+ 24"

=== Stage 4 ===
8 February 2020 – Pont du Gard to Mont Bouquet, 143.01 km (88.86 mi)

Stage 4 Result
Rank	Rider	Team	Time
1	Ben O'Connor (AUS)	NTT Pro Cycling	3h 20' 29"
2	Simon Clarke (AUS)	EF Pro Cycling	+ 16"
3	Kamil Małecki (POL)	CCC Team	+ 16"
4	Alberto Bettiol (ITA)	EF Pro Cycling	+ 26"
5	Benoît Cosnefroy (FRA)	AG2R La Mondiale	+ 29"
6	Diego Rosa (ITA)	Arkéa–Samsic	+ 33"
7	Laurens Huys (BEL)	Bingoal–Wallonie Bruxelles	+ 36"
8	Nicolas Edet (FRA)	Cofidis	+ 36"
9	Aurélien Paret-Peintre (FRA)	AG2R La Mondiale	+ 38"
10	Daniel Alejandro Mendez (COL)	Equipo Kern Pharma	+ 41"

General classification after Stage 4
Rank	Rider	Team	Time
1	Benoît Cosnefroy (FRA)	AG2R La Mondiale	14h 24' 17"
2	Alexys Brunel (FRA)	Groupama–FDJ	+ 24"
3	Alberto Bettiol (ITA)	EF Pro Cycling	+ 40"
4	Lilian Calmejane (FRA)	Total Direct Énergie	+ 43"
5	Kevin Geniets (LUX)	Groupama–FDJ	+ 45"
6	Edward Planckaert (BEL)	Sport Vlaanderen–Baloise	+ 1' 12"
7	Aurélien Paret-Peintre (FRA)	AG2R La Mondiale	+ 1' 25"
8	Laurens Huys (BEL)	Bingoal–Wallonie Bruxelles	+ 1' 28"
9	Damien Touzé (FRA)	Cofidis	+ 1' 29"
10	Daniel Alejandro Mendez (COL)	Equipo Kern Pharma	+ 1' 33"

=== Stage 5 ===
9 February 2020 – Alès to Alès, 10.88 km (6.76 mi), (ITT)

Stage 5 Result
Rank	Rider	Team	Time
1	Alberto Bettiol (ITA)	EF Pro Cycling	15' 13"
2	Magnus Cort (DEN)	EF Pro Cycling	+ 9"
3	Pierre Latour (FRA)	Groupama–FDJ	+ 15"
4	Alexys Brunel (FRA)	Groupama–FDJ	+ 17"
5	Michael Valgren (DEN)	NTT Pro Cycling	+ 24"
6	Ben O'Connor (AUS)	NTT Pro Cycling	+ 25"
7	Benoît Cosnefroy (FRA)	AG2R La Mondiale	+ 27"
8	Aurélien Paret-Peintre (FRA)	AG2R La Mondiale	+ 28"
9	Edvald Boasson Hagen (NOR)	NTT Pro Cycling	+ 29"
10	Kamil Małecki (POL)	CCC Team	+ 31"

General classification after Stage 5
Rank	Rider	Team	Time
1	Benoît Cosnefroy (FRA)	AG2R La Mondiale	14h 39' 57"
2	Alberto Bettiol (ITA)	EF Pro Cycling	+ 13"
3	Alexys Brunel (FRA)	Groupama–FDJ	+ 14"
4	Kevin Geniets (LUX)	Groupama–FDJ	+ 1' 02"
5	Lilian Calmejane (FRA)	Total Direct Énergie	+ 1' 05"
6	Aurélien Paret-Peintre (FRA)	AG2R La Mondiale	+ 1' 26"
7	Damien Touzé (FRA)	Cofidis	+ 1' 45"
8	Aimé De Gendt (BEL)	Circus–Wanty Gobert	+ 2' 14"
9	Jimmy Janssens (BEL)	Alpecin–Fenix	+ 2' 17"
10	Edward Planckaert (BEL)	Sport Vlaanderen–Baloise	+ 2' 19"

== Classification leadership table ==
Classification leadership by stage
Stage	Winner	General classification	Points classification	Mountains classification	Youth classification	Team classification
1	Alexys Brunel	Alexys Brunel	Alexys Brunel	Georg Zimmermann	Alexys Brunel	Groupama–FDJ
2	Magnus Cort	Alexys Brunel	Alexys Brunel	Georg Zimmermann	Alexys Brunel	Groupama–FDJ
3	Dries De Bondt	Alexys Brunel	Magnus Cort	Georg Zimmermann	Alexys Brunel	Groupama–FDJ
4	Ben O'Connor	Benoît Cosnefroy	Magnus Cort	Georg Zimmermann	Alexys Brunel	EF Pro Cycling
5	Alberto Bettiol	Benoît Cosnefroy	Magnus Cort	Georg Zimmermann	Alexys Brunel	EF Pro Cycling
Final		Benoît Cosnefroy	Magnus Cort	Georg Zimmermann	Alexys Brunel	EF Pro Cycling

== Classification standings ==
=== General classification ===
Final general classification (1–10)
Rank	Rider	Team	Time
1	Benoît Cosnefroy (FRA)	AG2R La Mondiale	14h 39' 57"
2	Alberto Bettiol (ITA)	EF Pro Cycling	+ 13"
3	Alexys Brunel (FRA)	Groupama–FDJ	+ 14"
4	Kevin Geniets (LUX)	Groupama–FDJ	+ 1' 02"
5	Lilian Calmejane (FRA)	Total Direct Énergie	+ 1' 05"
6	Aurélien Paret-Peintre (FRA)	AG2R La Mondiale	+ 1' 26"
7	Damien Touzé (FRA)	Cofidis	+ 1' 45"
8	Aimé De Gendt (BEL)	Circus–Wanty Gobert	+ 2' 14"
9	Jimmy Janssens (BEL)	Alpecin–Fenix	+ 2' 17"
10	Edward Planckaert (BEL)	Sport Vlaanderen–Baloise	+ 2' 19"

=== Points classification ===
Final points classification (1–10)
Rank	Rider	Team	Points
1	Magnus Cort (DEN)	EF Pro Cycling	66
2	Benoît Cosnefroy (FRA)	AG2R La Mondiale	47
3	Alexys Brunel (FRA)	Groupama–FDJ	44
4	Alberto Bettiol (ITA)	EF Pro Cycling	39
5	Ben O'Connor (AUS)	NTT Pro Cycling	37
6	Edvald Boasson Hagen (NOR)	NTT Pro Cycling	31
7	Georg Zimmermann (GER)	CCC Team	28
8	Dries De Bondt (BEL)	Alpecin–Fenix	27
9	Tom Devriendt (BEL)	Circus–Wanty Gobert	25
10	Kamil Małecki (POL)	CCC Team	22

=== Mountains classification ===
Final mountains classification (1–10)
Rank	Rider	Team	Points
1	Georg Zimmermann (GER)	CCC Team	28
2	Marti Marquez (ESP)	Equipo Kern Pharma	22
3	Simon Clarke (AUS)	EF Pro Cycling	18
4	Ben O'Connor (AUS)	NTT Pro Cycling	14
5	Maxime Cam (FRA)	B&B Hotels–Vital Concept	14
6	Benoît Cosnefroy (FRA)	AG2R La Mondiale	12
7	Pierre Latour (FRA)	Groupama–FDJ	10
8	Dimitri Claeys (BEL)	Cofidis	10
9	Kevin Geniets (LUX)	Groupama–FDJ	10
10	Kamil Małecki (POL)	CCC Team	10

=== Young rider classification ===
Final young rider classification (1–10)
Rank	Rider	Team	Time
1	Alexys Brunel (FRA)	Groupama–FDJ	14h 40' 11"
2	Kevin Geniets (LUX)	Groupama–FDJ	+ 48"
3	Laurens Huys (BEL)	Bingoal–Wallonie Bruxelles	+ 2' 19"
4	Daniel Alejandro Mendez (COL)	Equipo Kern Pharma	+ 2' 19"
7	Thibault Guernalec (FRA)	Arkéa–Samsic	+ 2' 28"
6	Mathieu Burgaudeau (FRA)	Total Direct Énergie	+ 2' 58"
5	Ibon Ruiz (ESP)	Equipo Kern Pharma	+ 3' 22"
8	Georg Zimmermann (GER)	CCC Team	+ 3' 59"
9	Biniam Girmay (ERI)	Nippo–Delko–One Provence	+ 4' 25"
10	Quinn Simmons (USA)	Trek–Segafredo	+ 5' 08"

=== Teams classification ===
Final teams classification (1–10)
Rank	Team	Time
1	EF Pro Cycling	44h 01' 40"
2	AG2R La Mondiale	+ 1' 03"
3	Groupama–FDJ	+ 1' 21"
4	CCC Team	+ 3' 55"
5	Cofidis	+ 4' 27"
6	Alpecin–Fenix	+ 6' 04"
7	Total Direct Énergie	+ 6' 32"
8	Arkéa–Samsic	+ 6' 57"
9	B&B Hotels–Vital Concept	+ 7' 27"
10	NTT Pro Cycling	+ 9' 33"
