= Milhaud (disambiguation) =

Darius Milhaud (1892–1974) was a French composer.

Milhaud may also refer to:

- Milhaud (name), French surname
- Milhaud, Gard, French village, origin of the surname
