= Milhau (name) =

Milhau is a family name. Notable people with it include:

- Jean Milhau (born 1929), French politician
- Marie-Louise Puech-Milhau (1876–1966), French pacifist, feminist and journal editor
- Moses ben Michael Milhau (born c. 1760), French rabbi and poet
- Roger Milhau (born 1955), French middle-distance runner
- Zella de Milhau (1870–1954), American artist, ambulance driver, community organizer and motorcycle policewoman

== See also ==
- Milhau, a commune in Aveyron
- Milhaud, a French family name
