= Brès =

Brès is a French surname. Notable people with the surname include:

- Camille Sophie Brès (born 1980), French physicist
- Madeleine Brès (1842–1921), French physician
