= Marguerittes =

- Commune
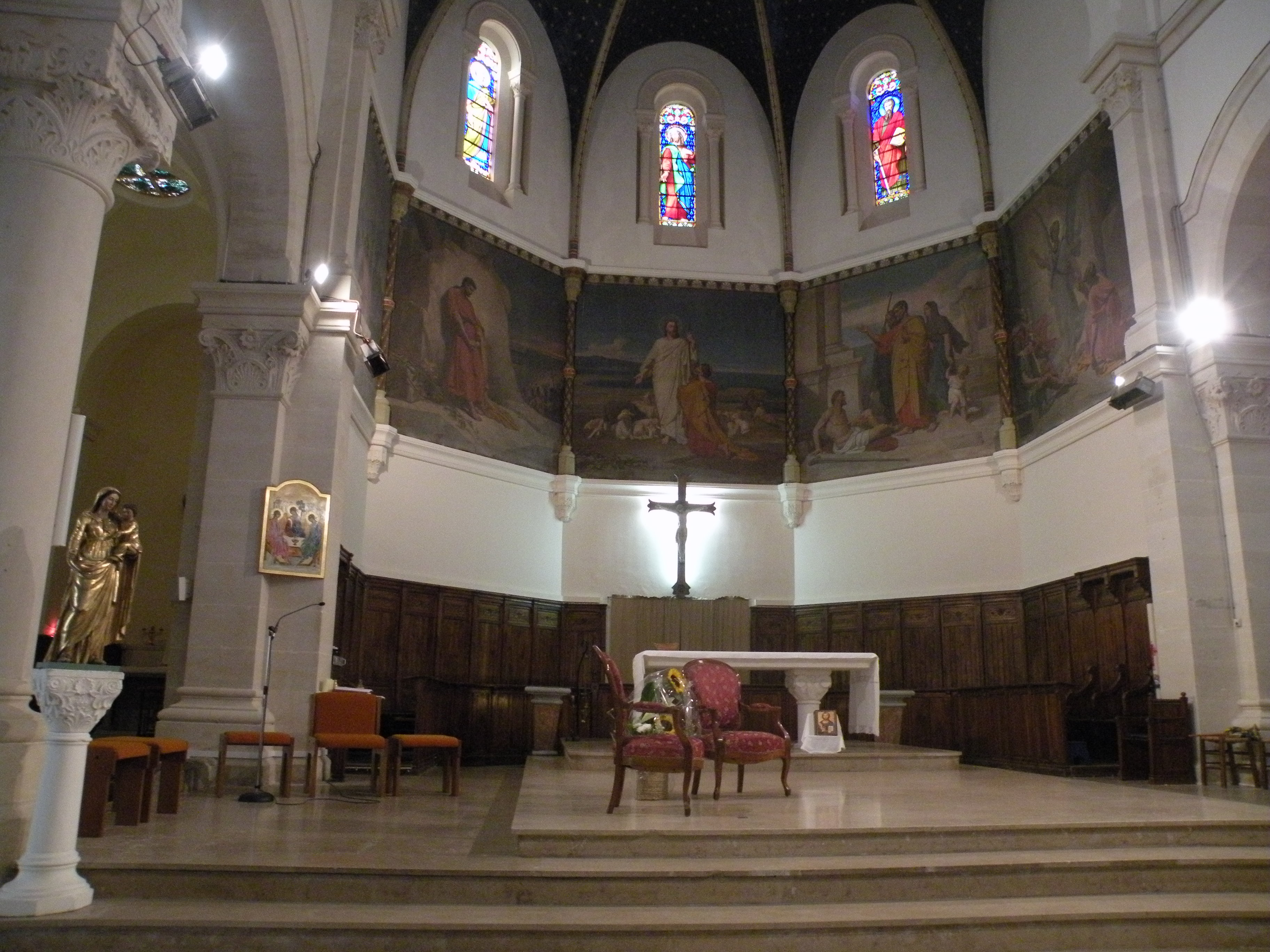
- The interior of the church of Saint-Pierre de Marguerittes

- Coat of arms
- Location of Marguerittes
- Location within France Location within Occitanie
- Coordinates: 43°51′39″N 4°26′41″E
- Country: France
- Region: Occitania
- Department: Gard
- Arrondissement: Nîmes
- Canton: Marguerittes
- Intercommunality: CA Nîmes Métropole

Government
  - Mayor (2020–2026): Rémi Nicolas
- Area^{1}: 25.29 km^{2} (9.76 sq mi)
- Elevation: 51 m (167 ft)
- Highest elevation: 197 m (646 ft)
- Lowest elevation: 41 m (135 ft)
- Population (2023): 8,346
  - Density: 330.0/km^{2} (854.7/sq mi)
- Time zone: UTC+01:00 (CET)
  - Summer (DST): UTC+02:00 (CEST)
- INSEE/Postal code: 30156 /30320
- ^{1} French Land Register data, which excludes lakes, ponds, glaciers > 1 km^{2} (0.386 sq mi or 247 acres) and river estuaries.

Marguerittes (French pronunciation: [maʁɡəʁit]; Occitan: Margarida) is a commune in the Gard department in southern France. In 1717, Antoine de Teissier (b.1667) was created the 1st Baron de Marguerittes. One of his sons was a Huguenot who took refuge in Switzerland and his grandson, Jean Antoine de Teissier, 3rd Baron of Marguerittes, was guillotined 20 May 1794. The 3rd Baron's son settled in England at Woodcote Park and was created Baron de Teissier by Louis XVIII in recognition of his father's sacrifices to France.

== Population ==
Historical population

Year	Pop.	±% p.a.
1793	2,103	—
1800	1,945	−1.11%
1806	2,305	+2.87%
1821	1,812	−1.59%
1831	1,925	+0.61%
1836	1,910	−0.16%
1841	1,886	−0.25%
1846	1,908	+0.23%
1851	1,972	+0.66%
1856	2,013	+0.41%
1861	2,037	+0.24%
1866	1,945	−0.92%
1872	1,889	−0.49%
1876	1,971	+1.07%
1881	1,905	−0.68%
1886	1,755	−1.63%
1891	1,684	−0.82%
1896	1,724	+0.47%
1901	1,637	−1.03%

Year	Pop.	±% p.a.
1906	1,580	−0.71%
1911	1,519	−0.78%
1921	1,514	−0.03%
1926	1,529	+0.20%
1931	1,528	−0.01%
1936	1,447	−1.08%
1946	1,421	−0.18%
1954	1,678	+2.10%
1962	2,030	+2.41%
1968	2,548	+3.86%
1975	3,150	+3.08%
1982	5,149	+7.27%
1990	7,548	+4.90%
1999	8,181	+0.90%
2007	8,656	+0.71%
2012	8,538	−0.27%
2017	8,586	+0.11%
2023	8,346	−0.47%

Source: EHESS and INSEE (1968-2023)

== See also ==
- Communes of the Gard department
