= Caissargues =

Commune in Occitanie, France

- Commune
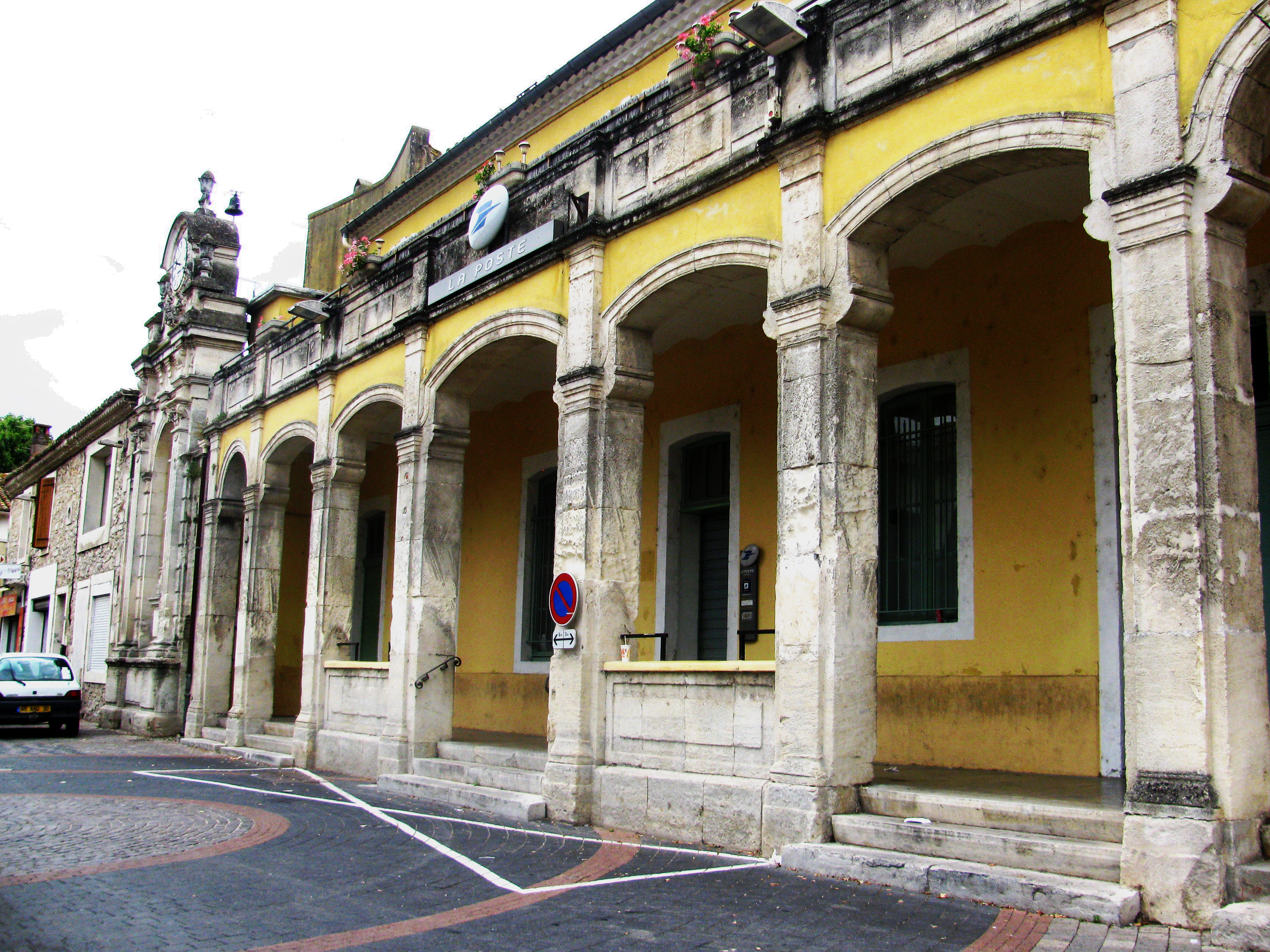
- The post office in Caissargues

- Coat of arms
- Location of Caissargues
- Location within France Location within Occitanie
- Coordinates: 43°47′48″N 4°22′46″E
- Country: France
- Region: Occitania
- Department: Gard
- Arrondissement: Nîmes
- Canton: Marguerittes
- Intercommunality: CA Nîmes Métropole

Government
  - Mayor (2020–2026): Olivier Fabregoul
- Area^{1}: 8.02 km^{2} (3.10 sq mi)
- Elevation: 27 m (89 ft)
- Highest elevation: 93 m (305 ft)
- Lowest elevation: 22 m (72 ft)
- Population (2023): 4,079
  - Density: 509/km^{2} (1,320/sq mi)
- Time zone: UTC+01:00 (CET)
  - Summer (DST): UTC+02:00 (CEST)
- INSEE/Postal code: 30060 /30132
- ^{1} French Land Register data, which excludes lakes, ponds, glaciers > 1 km^{2} (0.386 sq mi or 247 acres) and river estuaries.

Caissargues (French pronunciation: [kɛsaʁɡ]; Occitan: [kajˈsaɾ.ɡes]) is a commune in the Gard department in southern France.

== Population ==
Historical population
| Year | Pop. | ±% p.a. |
|---|---|---|
| 1968 | 810 | — |
| 1975 | 2,143 | +14.91% |
| 1982 | 3,300 | +6.36% |
| 1990 | 3,292 | −0.03% |
| 1999 | 3,326 | +0.11% |
| 2007 | 3,832 | +1.79% |
| 2012 | 3,825 | −0.04% |
| 2017 | 4,027 | +1.03% |
| 2023 | 4,079 | +0.21% |
Source: INSEE

== See also ==
- Communes of the Gard department
- Costières de Nîmes AOC
