= Millaud (surname) =

Millaud is a surname of French origin.

Notable people with the surname include:

- Albert Millaud (1844 – 1892), French journalist, writer and stage author
- Daniel Millaud (1928 – 2016), French Polynesian politician, nephew of Jean Millaud
- Jean Millaud (1906 – 1991), French Polynesian politician, uncle of Daniel Millaud
- Moïse Polydore Millaud (1813 – 1871), French founder of Le Petit Journal
- Terry Millaud (b. c. 1958), American suspect for the San Diego serial murders

== See also ==
- Milhaud (name)
