= Rodilhan =

- Commune
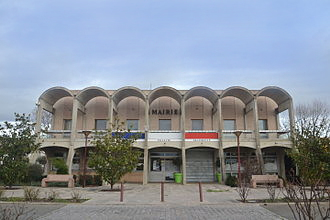
- The town hall in Rodilhan

- Coat of arms
- Location of Rodilhan
- Location within France Location within Occitanie
- Coordinates: 43°49′40″N 4°26′03″E
- Country: France
- Region: Occitania
- Department: Gard
- Arrondissement: Nîmes
- Canton: Marguerittes
- Intercommunality: CA Nîmes Métropole

Government
  - Mayor (2020–2026): Patrice Planes
- Area^{1}: 4.69 km^{2} (1.81 sq mi)
- Elevation: 45 m (148 ft)
- Highest elevation: 54 m (177 ft)
- Lowest elevation: 32 m (105 ft)
- Population (2023): 2,799
  - Density: 597/km^{2} (1,550/sq mi)
- Time zone: UTC+01:00 (CET)
  - Summer (DST): UTC+02:00 (CEST)
- INSEE/Postal code: 30356 /30230
- ^{1} French Land Register data, which excludes lakes, ponds, glaciers > 1 km^{2} (0.386 sq mi or 247 acres) and river estuaries.

Rodilhan (French pronunciation: [ʁɔdijɑ̃]) is a commune in the Gard department in southern France. It was created in 1961 from part of the commune of Bouillargues.

== Population ==
Historical population
| Year | Pop. | ±% p.a. |
|---|---|---|
| 1968 | 1,019 | — |
| 1975 | 1,731 | +7.86% |
| 1982 | 1,784 | +0.43% |
| 1990 | 2,411 | +3.84% |
| 1999 | 2,493 | +0.37% |
| 2007 | 2,528 | +0.17% |
| 2012 | 2,963 | +3.23% |
| 2017 | 2,878 | −0.58% |
| 2023 | 2,799 | −0.46% |
Source: INSEE

== See also ==
- Communes of the Gard department
- Costières de Nîmes AOC
