= Alexys Brunel =

French cyclist (born 1998)

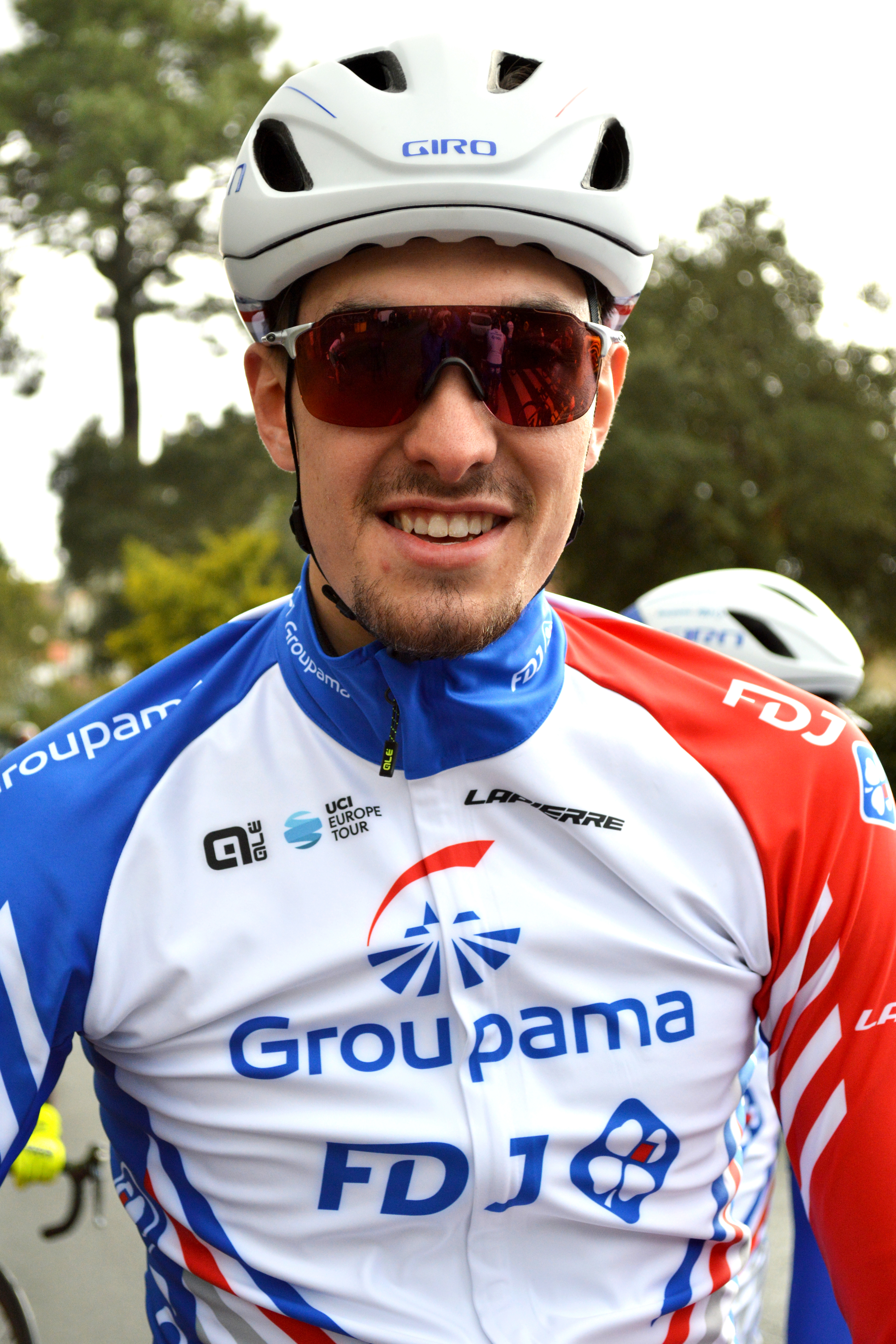
- Brunel in 2019

Personal information
- Born: 10 October 1998 (age 28) Boulogne-sur-Mer, France
- Height: 1.9 m (6 ft 3 in)
- Weight: 80 kg (176 lb)

Cycling career
- Sport: Cycling
- Current team: Groove Gravel
- Disciplines: Road; Gravel
- Role: Rider

Amateur teams
- 2015–2016: Dunkirk Littoral Juniors
- 2017–2018: CC Étupes
- 2018: Groupama–FDJ (stagiaire)
- 2019: Groupama–FDJ (stagiaire)
- 2022: Uni Sport Lamentinois
- 2023: Dunkerque Grand Littoral
- 2024: Groove Gravel

Professional teams
- 2019: Équipe Continentale Groupama–FDJ
- 2020–2021: Groupama–FDJ (Note: Brunel also competed at the 2020 Le Samyn with the Équipe Continentale Groupama–FDJ, following the introduction of a UCI rule allowing riders registered with a UCI WorldTeam or UCI ProTeam to participate in class 1 or 2 events with a related development team.)
- 2022: UAE Team Emirates
- 2025–: Team TotalEnergies

Alexys Brunel (born 10 October 1998) is a French cyclist, who currently rides for UCI ProTeam Team TotalEnergies. Brunel retired on 22 June 2022 from professional cycling to focus on other aspects of life. However, he has since returned to racing as an amateur, notably winning a stage of the 2022 Tour de Guadeloupe.

== Major results ==
2015
National Junior Road Championships

2nd Road race
2nd Time trial

2nd La Philippe Gilbert Juniors
10th Time trial, UCI Junior Road World Championships
2016
1st Time trial, UEC European Junior Road Championships
1st Chrono des Nations Juniors
1st Gent–Wevelgem Juniors
1st Mountains classification, Course de la Paix Juniors
2nd Time trial, National Junior Road Championships
2nd La Philippe Gilbert Juniors
2017
1st Time trial, National Under-23 Road Championships
6th Paris–Roubaix Espoirs
9th Time trial, UEC European Under-23 Road Championships
2018
National Under-23 Road Championships

1st Time trial
2nd Road race

1st Time trial, National Amateur Road Championships
2nd Chrono des Nations U23
3rd Liège–Bastogne–Liège U23
8th Time trial, UEC European Under-23 Road Championships
2019
1st Paris–Tours Espoirs
5th Overall Tour de Bretagne
2020 (1 pro win)
3rd Overall Étoile de Bessèges

1st Young rider classification
1st Stage 1

2021
3rd Time trial, National Road Championships
8th Polynormande
2022
1st Stage 8 Tour de Guadeloupe
2024
1st Criterium Ivan Graït Memorial
1st Stages 2 & 3 Oregon Trail Gravel
UCI Gravel World Series

2nd Houffa

2nd Utopia Gravel Fest
2025 (1)
1st Grote Prijs Jean-Pierre Monseré
