= 2022 Grand Prix du Morbihan =

2022 UCI ProSeries

Race details
- Dates: 14 May 2022
- Stages: 1
- Distance: 185.4 km (115.2 mi)
- Winning time: 4h 24' 58"

Results
	Winner	Julien Simon (FRA)	(Team TotalEnergies)
	Second	Alexander Kristoff (NOR)	(Intermarché–Wanty–Gobert Matériaux)
	Third	Jake Stewart (GBR)	(Groupama–FDJ)

The 2022 Grand Prix du Morbihan was the 45th edition of the Grand Prix du Morbihan, a one-day road cycling race held on 14 May 2022 in and around Grand-Champ, Morbihan, in the Brittany region of northwestern France.

== Teams ==
Six of the eighteen UCI WorldTeams, nine UCI ProTeams, and six UCI Continental teams made up the 21 teams that participated in the race.

UCI WorldTeams

- AG2R Citroën Team
- Cofidis
- Groupama–FDJ
- Intermarché–Wanty–Gobert Matériaux
- Lotto–Soudal
- UAE Team Emirates

UCI ProTeams

- Arkéa–Samsic
- B&B Hotels–KTM
- Bingoal Pauwels Sauces WB
- Burgos BH
- Caja Rural–Seguros RGA
- Equipo Kern Pharma
- Euskaltel–Euskadi
- Team TotalEnergies
- Uno-X Pro Cycling Team

UCI Continental Teams

- St. Michel–Auber93
- Bike Aid
- Go Sport–Roubaix–Lille Métropole
- Nice Métropole Côte d'Azur
- Premier Tech U-23 Cycling Project
- Team UC Nantes Atlantique

== Result ==
Result
Rank	Rider	Team	Time
1	Julien Simon (FRA)	Team TotalEnergies	4h 24' 58"
2	Alexander Kristoff (NOR)	Intermarché–Wanty–Gobert Matériaux	+ 0"
3	Jake Stewart (GBR)	Groupama–FDJ	+ 0"
4	Amaury Capiot (BEL)	Arkéa–Samsic	+ 0"
5	Luca Mozzato (ITA)	B&B Hotels–KTM	+ 0"
6	Eddy Finé (FRA)	Cofidis	+ 0"
7	Clément Venturini (FRA)	AG2R Citroën Team	+ 0"
8	Flavien Maurelet (FRA)	St. Michel–Auber93	+ 0"
9	Florian Vermeersch (BEL)	Lotto–Soudal	+ 0"
10	Jonathan Lastra (ESP)	Caja Rural–Seguros RGA	+ 0"
