= Garons =

- Commune
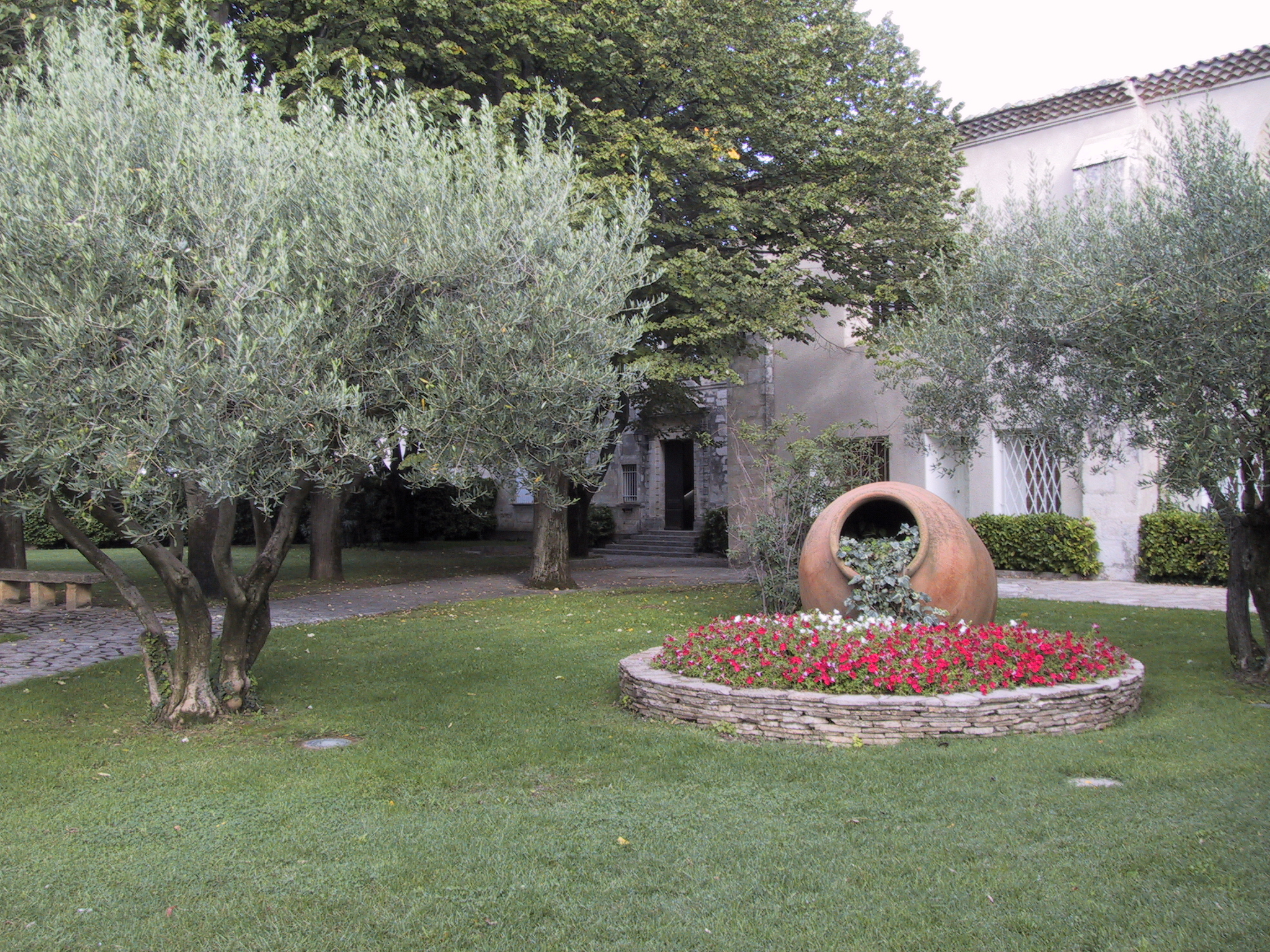
- Town hall

- Coat of arms
- Location of Garons
- Location within France Location within Occitanie
- Coordinates: 43°46′09″N 4°25′45″E
- Country: France
- Region: Occitania
- Department: Gard
- Arrondissement: Nîmes
- Canton: Marguerittes
- Intercommunality: CA Nîmes Métropole

Government
  - Mayor (2025–2026): Yves Rodriguez
- Area^{1}: 12.28 km^{2} (4.74 sq mi)
- Elevation: 94 m (308 ft)
- Highest elevation: 96 m (315 ft)
- Lowest elevation: 54 m (177 ft)
- Population (2023): 5,381
  - Density: 438.2/km^{2} (1,135/sq mi)
- Time zone: UTC+01:00 (CET)
  - Summer (DST): UTC+02:00 (CEST)
- INSEE/Postal code: 30125 /30128
- ^{1} French Land Register data, which excludes lakes, ponds, glaciers > 1 km^{2} (0.386 sq mi or 247 acres) and river estuaries.

Garons is a commune in the Gard department in southern France.

The Nîmes-Alès-Camargue-Cévennes Airport, also called "Garons Airport" is located very close to Garons, on the territory of the commune of Saint-Gilles.

== Population ==
Historical population
Year	Pop.	±% p.a.
1968	1,317	—
1975	2,049	+6.52%
1982	2,788	+4.50%
1990	3,648	+3.42%
1999	3,692	+0.13%
2007	4,296	+1.91%
2012	4,617	+1.45%
2017	4,895	+1.18%
2023	5,381	+1.59%
Source: INSEE

== See also ==
- Costières de Nîmes AOC
- Communes of the Gard department
