= Bouillargues =

Commune in Occitanie, France

- Commune
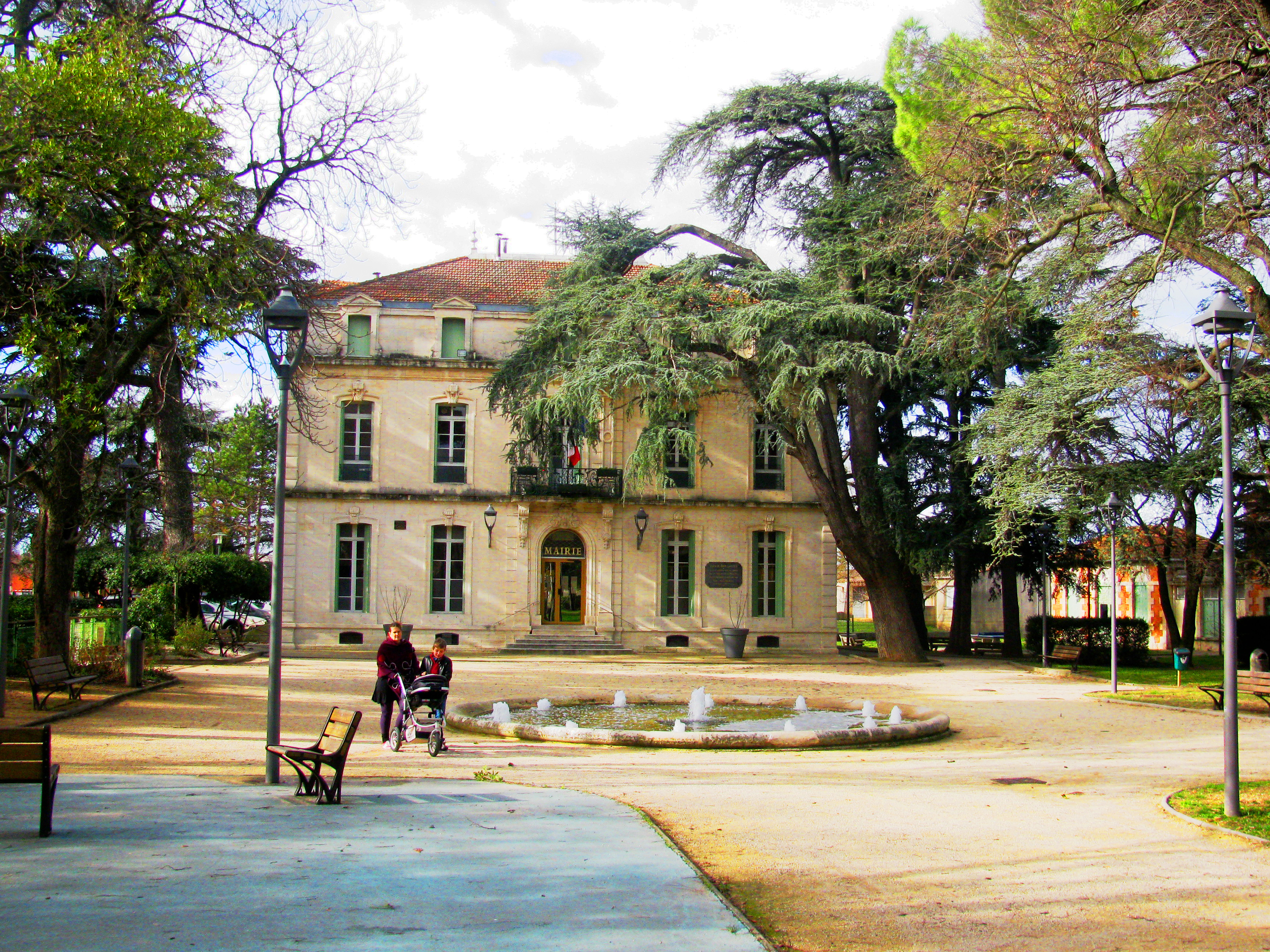
- The town hall of Bouillargues

- Coat of arms
- Location of Bouillargues
- Location within France Location within Occitanie
- Coordinates: 43°48′03″N 4°25′39″E
- Country: France
- Region: Occitania
- Department: Gard
- Arrondissement: Nîmes
- Canton: Marguerittes
- Intercommunality: CA Nîmes Métropole

Government
  - Mayor (2020–2026): Maurice Gaillard
- Area^{1}: 15.77 km^{2} (6.09 sq mi)
- Elevation: 74 m (243 ft)
- Highest elevation: 84 m (276 ft)
- Lowest elevation: 27 m (89 ft)
- Population (2023): 6,070
  - Density: 385/km^{2} (997/sq mi)
- Time zone: UTC+01:00 (CET)
  - Summer (DST): UTC+02:00 (CEST)
- INSEE/Postal code: 30047 /30230
- ^{1} French Land Register data, which excludes lakes, ponds, glaciers > 1 km^{2} (0.386 sq mi or 247 acres) and river estuaries.

Bouillargues (French pronunciation: [bujaʁg]; Occitan: Bolhargues) is a commune in the Gard department in southern France. It includes the hamlets of Garons, Caissargues and Rodilhan. It is situated to the southeast and close to the city of Nimes and in 2023 it had just over 6,000 residents.

== Geography ==
Bouillargues is located just southeast of the city of Nimes, at the northern edge of the Camargue and between two major highways, the N113 and the RD 135. The centre of Nimes is 7.6 kilometres (4.7 mi) away, the airport is 3.4 kilometres (2.1 mi) to the south, Montpellier is 59 kilometres (37 mi) away, Avignon 54 kilometres (34 mi), Marseille 117 kilometres (73 mi) and Paris 717 kilometres (446 mi). The climate in Bouillargues is hot in summer and mild in winter. As of January 2013, there were just over 6,000 inhabitants of the town. The area was renowned for its production of grain.

== History ==
The suffix "-argues", common in the south of France, suggests that the town of Bouillargues has been in existence since antiquity. Originally called "Buliancius" after Bublius who owned property there, it was known as Bouillargues in 1706. In 1182, there was already a community consisting of four farms or estates. The sixteenth century saw turbulent times in the area during the French wars of religion. The Catholics revolted in 1572 and the town changed hands several times, with the church being destroyed and then rebuilt. In 1654, the Huguenots built a temple but this was ordered to be demolished in 1663. By 1737, Joseph de Louet, Baron de Manduel had subjugated the village and his place was later taken by François Hercule Massip. In 1790, Bouillargues became a commune, and later the hamlets of Garons, Caissargues and Rodilhan were annexed. The commune of Rodilhan was created in 1961 from part of the commune of Bouillargues.

== Landmarks ==
St Felix Church (Église St Félix) was built around 1156 but was damaged along with the rest of the village during the Albigensian Wars in 1167. It was completely destroyed during the wars between the Protestants and the Catholics but was rebuilt in 1654, enlarged in 1843 and completed in 1890. It houses an 18th-century wooden statue of the Virgin Mary bearing the infant Jesus.

The present town hall is housed in the Château de Bouillargues which was purchased for the commune in 1957. After the completion of renovation work, the new town hall was inaugurated in 1978. The first floor houses the mayor's office and a meeting room for the local council, while the local administration has offices on the ground floor. The town hall is at the centre of a well-maintained park with old cedars and flower beds.

The village bullring, Les Arènes André Dupuis, is named after the mayor of Bouillargues who died weeks before it was inaugurated in 2010. Collège Les Fontaines, founded in 1970, lies in the eastern part of the town.

== Population ==
Historical population

Year	Pop.	±% p.a.
1800	2,084	—
1851	2,623	+0.45%
1901	2,372	−0.20%
1921	1,403	−2.59%
1946	1,418	+0.04%
1968	1,935	+1.42%
1975	2,853	+5.70%

Year	Pop.	±% p.a.
1982	3,720	+3.86%
1990	4,336	+1.93%
1999	5,253	+2.15%
2007	5,641	+0.89%
2012	6,240	+2.04%
2017	6,328	+0.28%
2023	6,070	−0.69%

Source: EHESS and INSEE (1968–2023)

== Personalities ==
- Jacques de Baroncelli (1881–1951) – filmmaker
- Madeleine Brès (1842–1921) – first woman to have obtained a medical license in France
- Roger Gal (1906–1966) – pedagogue
- Michel Pons (1864–1934) – railway official and restaurateur

== See also ==
- Communes of the Gard department
- Costières de Nîmes AOC

== Bibliography ==
- Ménard, Léon (1751). Histoire civile ecclésiastique, et littéraire de la ville de Nismes: avec des notes et les preuves; suivie de dissertations historiques & critiques sur ses antiquités & de diverses observations sur son histoire naturelle. H. D. Chaubert.
- Pons, Michel (1907). Bouillargues et ses environs (in French). Res Universis. ISBN 978-2-87760-229-7.
