= Nîmes–Alès–Camargue–Cévennes Airport =

Nîmes–Alès–Camargue–Cévennes Airport Aéroport de Nîmes-Alès-Camargue-Cévennes
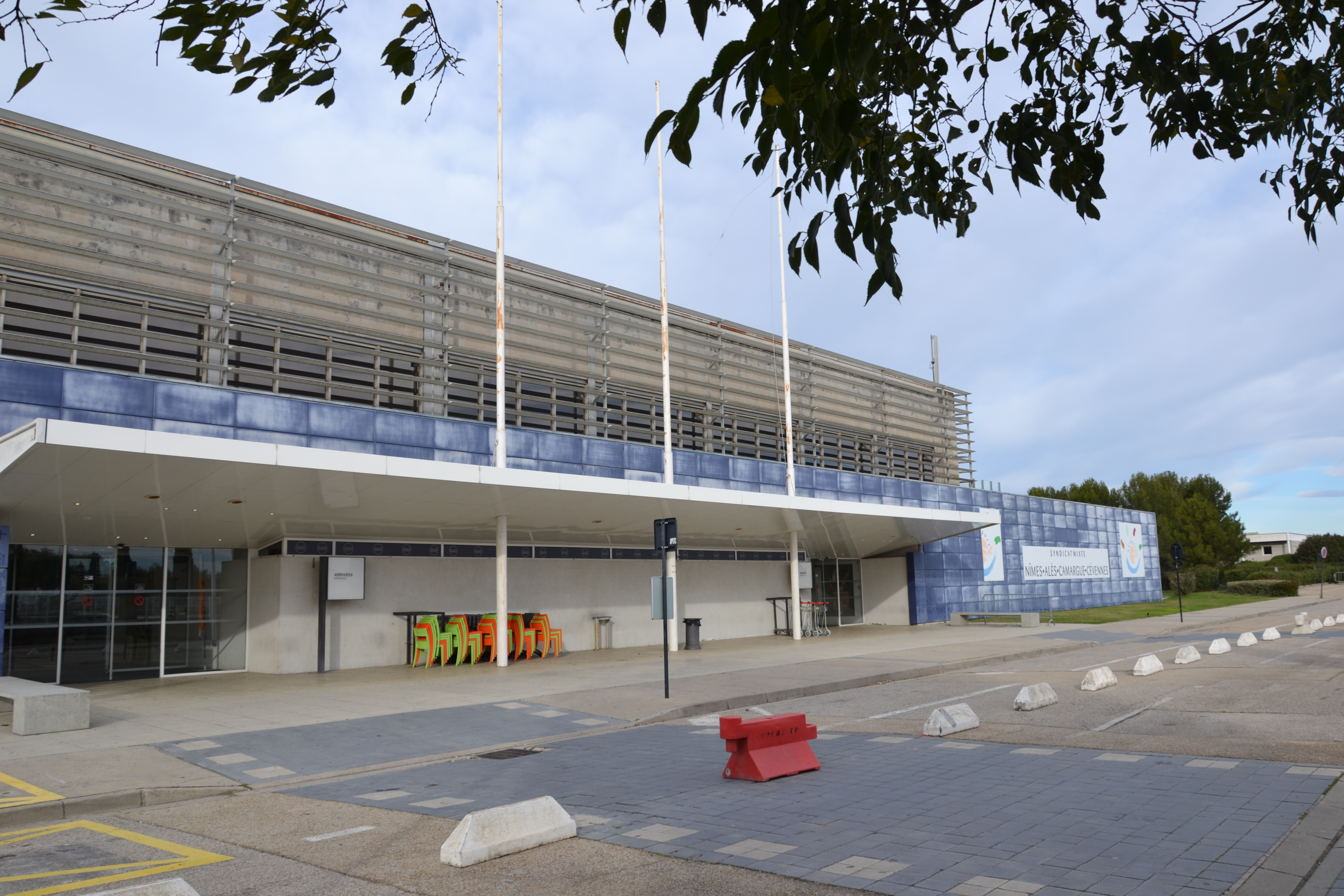
- IATA: FNI; ICAO: LFTW

Summary
- Airport type: Public / military
- Operator: Edeis
- Serves: Nîmes, Gard, France
- Location: Saint-Gilles / Garons
- Elevation AMSL: 309 ft (94 m)
- Coordinates: 43°45′27″N 004°24′59″E
- Website: https://www.nimes.aeroport.fr/

Map
- Location of airport in Occitanie region LFTW (France)

Runways
Direction	Length		Surface
Direction	m	ft	Surface
18/36	2,443	8,015	Concrete

Statistics (2014)
- Passengers: 207,553
- Passenger change 13-14: ▲6.3%
- Sources: AIP, Airport, UAF, DAFIF

Nîmes Airport or Nîmes–Alès–Camargue–Cévennes Airport (French: Aéroport de Nîmes-Alès-Camargue-Cevenas; Occitan: Aeroport de Nimes–Alès–Camarga–Cevènnes) (IATA: FNI, ICAO: LFTW) is an airport located 9 km (4.9 NM) south-southeast of the city of Nîmes, in the village of Saint-Gilles near Garons, France. It is also known as Garons Airport or Nîmes Garons Airport. The airport serves the Provence region, including the communes of Nîmes and Alès in the Gard department, the Camargue area and the Cévennes.

It currently has some commercial services, operated by Irish carrier Ryanair, as well as serving as a naval air base. The French navy (Marine Nationale) pulled out some years ago. Their former facilities are now used by the Armee de Terre. The Securite Civile flying base, formerly at Marseille (LFML), has moved to Garons.

== Facilities ==
The airport is at an elevation of 309 feet (94 m) above mean sea level. It has one paved runway designated 18/36 which measures 2,443 by 45 metres (8,015 ft × 148 ft).

== Airlines and destinations ==
The following airlines operate regular scheduled and charter flights at Nîmes–Alès–Camargue–Cévennes Airport:

Airlines	Destinations
Ryanair	Charleroi, Fes, Marrakesh; Seasonal: Dublin, London–Stansted

The nearest domestic and international airport is Montpellier - Méditerranée Airport, which is located 58 km (36 mi) south east of Nîmes–Alès–Camargue–Cévennes Airport.

== Controversy ==
In April 2012, the European Commission announced that it had launched an in-depth investigation into the financial arrangements that Nîmes Airport had with public authorities and Ryanair. The investigation would determine if public subsidies given to the airport, as well as rebates and marketing agreements with Ryanair, breached EU rules on state aid. The commission announced that it would examine the following issues:

- whether public subsidies of over €2 million and cash advances totalling over €9 million received by the Chamber of Commerce between 2000 and 2006 and public subsidies received by Veolia Transport since 2007 covered their ordinary operating expenses as airport operators, thereby giving them an undue economic advantage over competitors.
- whether agreements (such as marketing support contracts and discounts on airport charges) between the airport operators and Ryanair would have been contracted by a market economy investor and, if not, Ryanair would have been receiving an undue economic advantage that its competitors do not enjoy.
- whether part of the aid received by the airport operators had been passed on to Ryanair.

In response to the announcement, Ryanair maintained that its 'arrangements with all EU airports comply with competition rules'.
