= Flavien Maurelet =

French cyclist

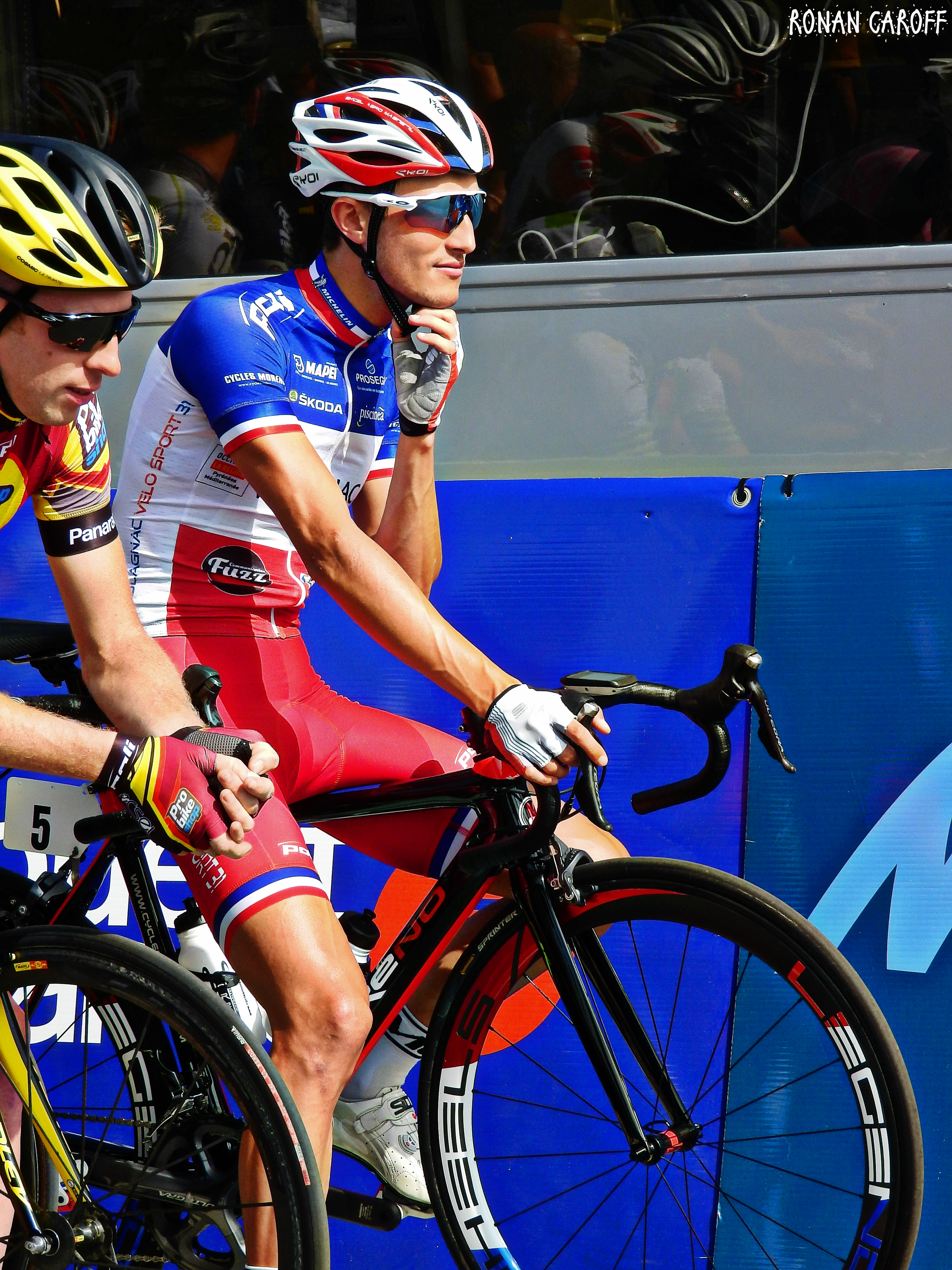
- Maldonado at the 2015 Grand Prix de Denain

Personal information
- Born: 16 March 1991 (age 35) Senlis, France
- Height: 1.77 m (5 ft 10 in)
- Weight: 56 kg (123 lb)

Cycling career
- Sport: Cycling
- Current team: Retired
- Discipline: Road
- Role: Rider
- Rider type: Puncheur

Amateur teams
- 2007–2008: SC Val d'Arré
- 2009: VC Beauvais Oise
- 2010: USSA Pavilly Barentin
- 2011–2014: CC Nogent-sur-Oise
- 2015–2017: GSC Blagnac Vélo Sport 31

Professional team
- 2018–2023: St. Michel–Auber93

Flavien Maurelet (born 16 March 1991) is a French former cyclist, who competed as a professional from 2018 to 2023 for UCI Continental team St. Michel–Mavic–Auber93.

== Major results ==
2015
1st Stage 2 Vuelta a Toledo
2017
1st Road race, National Amateur Road Championships
1st Stage 1 Vuelta Ciclista a León
2nd Overall Tour de Gironde

1st Stage 1

3rd Overall Tour Nivernais Morvan

1st Stage 1

2018
8th Polynormande
9th Paris–Chauny
2022
8th Grand Prix du Morbihan
