= Madeleine Brès =

French physician (1842–1921)

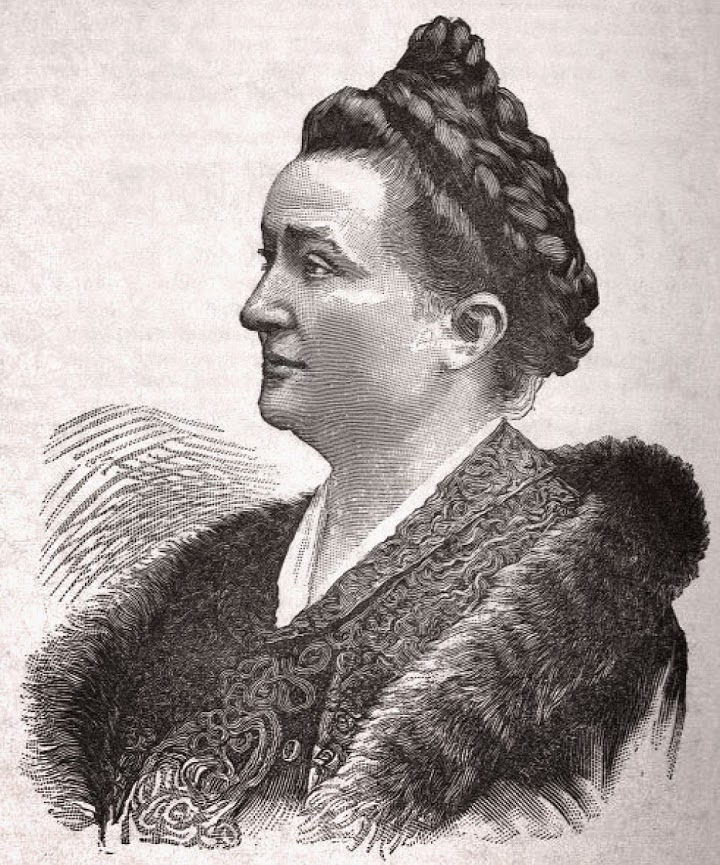
- Born: Madeleine Alexandrine Gebelin; 25 November 1842; Bouillargues, France
- Died: 30 November 1921 (aged 79); Montrouge, France

Madeleine Alexandrine Brès (née Gebelin; 26 November 1842 – 30 November 1921) was a French pediatrician and the first French woman to obtain a medical degree. In 1875, she defended her thesis on breastfeeding. As a result, she was the first French woman to become a doctor of medicine. She later founded her own nursery in the Batignolles district of Paris where she cared for children up to the age of three.

== Childhood ==
Born Madeleine Alexandrine Gebelin on 26 November 1842 in Bouillargues, she stated in the Medical Chronicle on 1 April 1895 that her interest in medicine began in early childhood. She often accompanied her craftsman father to the hospital in Nîmes where he sometimes undertook work. At the hospital, a nun took a liking to her and taught her basic techniques, such as the preparation of herbal teas and poultices.

She was twelve when the Gebelin family moved to Paris, and was only fifteen when she married Adrien-Stéphane Brès, a tram conductor and took his surname, becoming known as Madeleine Brès.

== Education ==
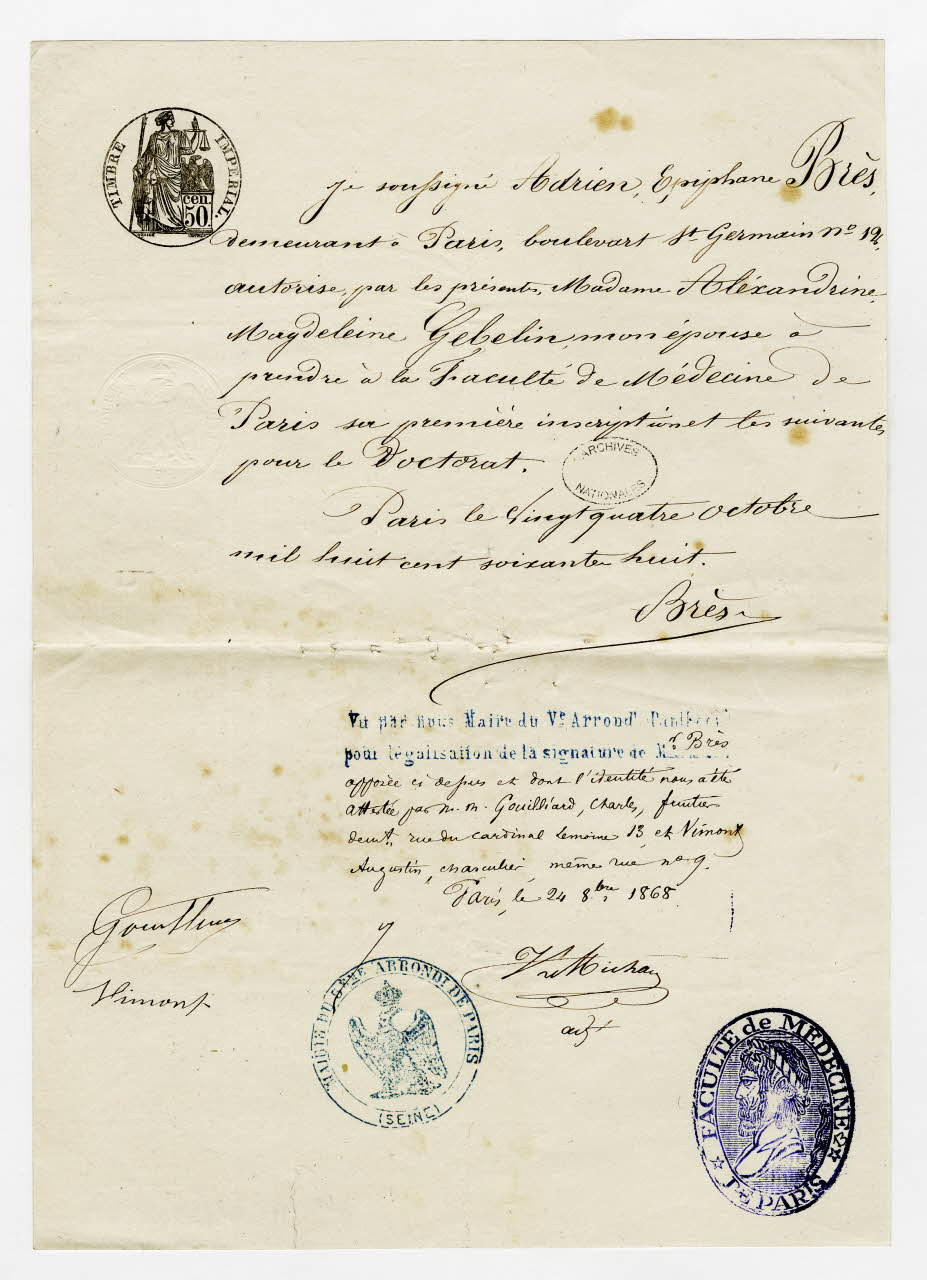
Document certifying Adrien Brès' permission for his wife Madeleine Brès to enrol at the Faculty of Medicine in Paris.

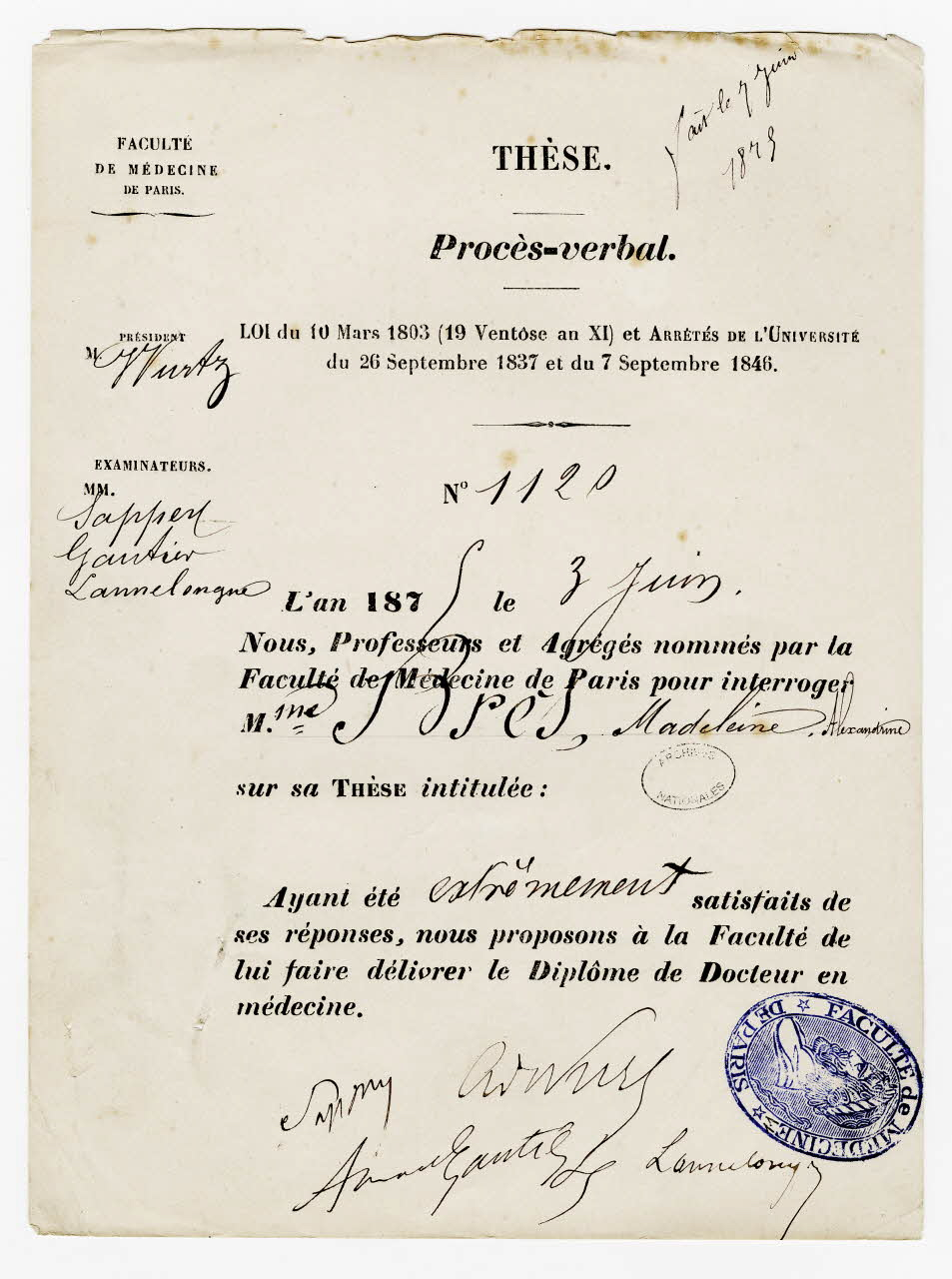
Minutes of Madeleine Brès's thesis defence - Archives Nationales (France) - AJ-16-6885-1

In 1866, Brès presented herself to Charles Adolphe Wurtz, the dean of the Faculty of Medicine at the University of Paris, and asked for permission to enroll in medical studies. The dean agreed, on the condition that she first earn a baccalaureate degree in Arts and Sciences, a general requirement for entry into medical school. It was only five years since Julie-Victoire Daubié had been the first woman to earn a baccalaureate degree. Only 299 women succeeded in earning a baccalaureate degree between 1861 and 1896. Brès had to obtain the consent of her husband to undertake her studies, as French law at the time judged married women to be the legal responsibility of their husbands. Brès earned her baccalaureate undergraduate degree in three years. By then, she was 26 years old and a mother of three. Brès presented herself to the dean once again, noting that there were no further obstacles to her enrollment.

Dean Wurtz took Brès's application to the Minister of Education, Victor Duruy, who approved her admission but preemptively brought the matter to the Council of Ministers. Empress Eugénie interceded on her behalf. After her husband formally gave his consent to the mayor of the 5th arrondissement of Paris, she became a medical student at the University of Paris in 1869 in the service of Professor Paul Broca at Mercy Hospital. Her admission was facilitated by the Law of 19 Ventôse Year XI (10 March 1803), which regulated the practice of medicine. She was admitted and studied alongside three foreign women, the American Mary Putnam, the Russian Catherine Gontcharoff, and the Englishwoman Elizabeth Garrett Anderson, all of whom held Bachelor level equivalent degrees in their respective countries.

== Internship and war service ==
Brès excelled in her studies. During her second year in 1869, she was a student under Professor Broca at the Pitié Hospital. The onset of the Franco-Prussian War (1870-1871) led to the departure of many hospital physicians for the front, leading Professor Broca to suggest she be made a temporary intern. She served in this capacity from September 1870 to July 1871. During the Siege of Paris and the Paris Commune, she remained at her post.

Certificates from other physicians and the hospital administration praised her performance. Professor Broca wrote:

Madame Brès, in my opinion, was appointed provisional intern. In that quality, during the two sieges of Paris and through the month of July 1871, she performed her service with such detail that no bombardment of our hospital was able to interrupt. Her service has always been perfect and her tenure irreproachable.

Strengthened by this experience, Brès decided to pursue a hospital career and took the external and internal examinations. Despite Professor Broca's support, the director of the hospital's Public Assistance refused her authorisation to apply for an externship on 21 December 1871. The refusal stated:

If it had been just you personally, I think I can tell you that permission would probably have been granted. But the Council understood that it could not limit the issue in this way and, examining it in general terms in terms of its application and future consequences, the Council regretted that it could not authorise the innovation that our Administration would have enshrined.

Brès did not push further. Access to hospital externships for female medical students did not become effective until 1882, when Blanche Edwards-Pilliet (1848–1941) became the first French hospital extern. The application process for internships was not opened to women until 1886; the first French female intern to earn the official title was Marthe Francillon-Lobre (1873–1956) in 1900.

== Career in medicine ==
A clinical report on vin Nourry iodotané by Brès

While studying medicine, Brès spent four years at the Museum of Natural History under Edmond Frémy and three years in the laboratory of Charles Adolphe Wurtz. She prepared a research thesis titled Of Breasts and Breastfeeding (French: De la mamelle et de l'allaitement), which she defended on 3 June 1875. She demonstrated that the chemical composition of breast milk is modified during the course of breastfeeding to better aid the growth and development of the infant.

Brès received a grade of "extrêmement bien" (extremely good) and her thesis became known in France and abroad. She became the first French woman to become a Doctor of Medicine. The British Elizabeth Garrett Anderson had earned the first medical degree awarded to a woman in France in 1870.

Widowed and responsible for three children, Brès decided against further pursuit of a hospital job. She moved to the Rue Boissy-d'Anglas in Paris and specialised in pediatric medicine and hygiene. She was surrounded by a wealthy middle-class clientele.

She was appointed by the Prefect of the Seine to teach guidelines to personnel in maternal schools, crèches, and kindergartens throughout the twenty administrative districts of Paris.

In 1885, she founded her own nursery at 83 Rue Nollet in the Batignolles district, where she cared for infants and children up to age 3 for free. This institution, which she financed herself, was visited by Théophile Roussel and later by Marie-Louise Loubet. The nursery eventually became a municipal institution but retained her name in recognition of her services.

In 1891, on a mission for the Ministry of the Interior, she traveled to Switzerland to study the organisation and structure of nurseries and asylums. Brès also directed the journal Hygiène de la femme et de l'enfant (Women's and Children's Hygiene) and authored multiple books on child care and pediatric nursing.

== Death ==
In 1921, the Pennsylvania Medical Journal reported that at age 82, Brès was "blind and penniless". She died in poverty in Montrouge on 30 November 1921.

== Works and publications ==
- De la mamelle et de l'allaitement [Of Breasts and Breastfeeding]. Thesis for the doctorate of medicine, 1875.
- L'Allaitement artificiel et le biberon [Artificial Feeding and the Bottle].[attachment_0](attachment) G. Masson (Paris), 1877. Available on Gallica.
- L'Hygiène de la femme et de l'enfant.
- A clinical report on Vin Nourry Iodotané. New York: E. Fougera & Company, 1893.

== Tributes ==
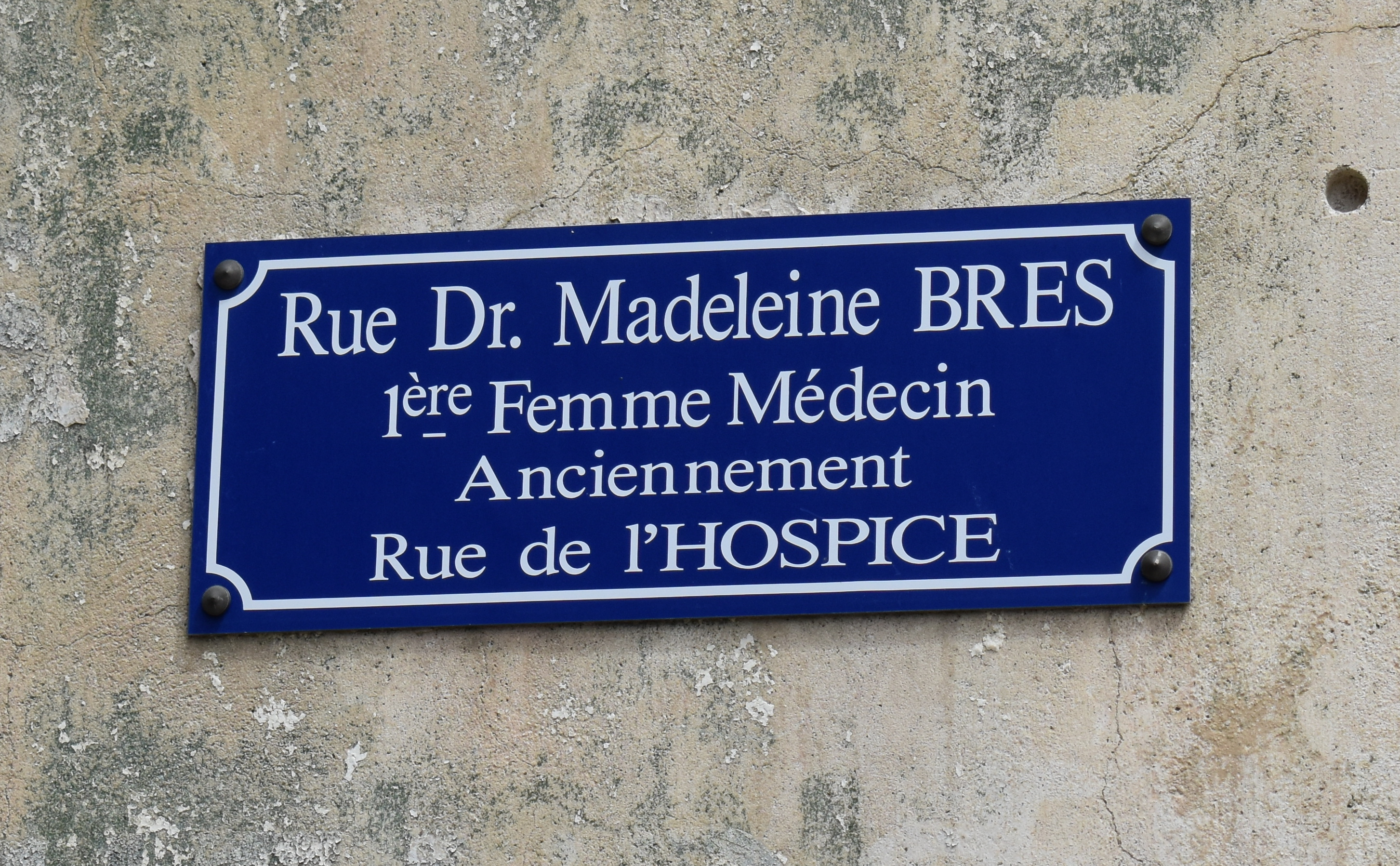
Rue Dr. Madeleine Brès in Limoux

- Several schools and nurseries (crèches) in France are named after her, including those in Bobigny, Fresnes, and Pas-de-Calais.
- A wing of the Hospital of Argenteuil (Val-d'Oise), opened in 2013, is named in her honour.
- Streets in Paris, Besançon, Nantes, Cabestany, Limoux, Perpignan, Poitiers, Lille, and Laval have been named after her.
- On 25 November 2019, Google celebrated her 177th birthday with a Google Doodle.

In 2026, Brès was announced as one of 72 historical women in STEM whose names were proposed to be added to the 72 men already celebrated on the Eiffel Tower. The plan was conceived by a student and tour guide named Bernard Rigaud and the list was announced by the Mayor of Paris, Anne Hidalgo following the recommendations of a committee led by Isabelle Vauglin of Femmes et Sciences and Jean-François Martins, representing the operating company which runs the Eiffel Tower.

== Distinctions ==
- Officer of the Academy (Officier d'Académie) in 1878.
- Officer of Public Instruction (Officier de l'Instruction Publique) in 1887.
