= Milhaud (name) =

Milhaud is a French family name of geographic origin from Milhaud, a small commune of 5,611 population (2008) in France's Gard. The place name Milhaud is derived from the Roman family name Aemilius with the suffix -avus.

The surname may refer to the following people:

- Darius Milhaud (1892–1974), French composer and teacher
- Edgard Milhaud (1873–1964), French professor of economics
- Édouard Jean Baptiste Milhaud (1766–1833), French politician and army general
- Madeleine Milhaud (1902–2008), French actress and librettist, wife of the composer Milhaud
- Gaston Milhaud (1858–1918), French philosopher and historian of science

== See also ==
- Millaud (surname)
