= Camille Sophie Brès =

French physicist and academic

Camille-Sophie Bres
- Born: 1980 (age 45–46)
- Education: McGill University; Princeton University
- Scientific career
- Workplaces: Swiss Federal Institute of Technology Lausanne; University of California San Diego
- Thesis: Optical CDMA for access networks : design, demonstration and analysis (2007)

Camille-Sophie Brès (born 1980) is a French physicist who is a professor at the École Polytechnique Fédérale de Lausanne. Her research considers optical communications and nonlinear processes in optical fibre platforms.

== Early life and education ==
Brès was born in France. She became interested in physics and maths at a young age, and enjoyed playing with LEGO. She decided to specialise in engineering, and studied electrical engineering at McGill University. She moved to Princeton University for graduate studies, where she developed optical code-division multiple access for networks. In 2006, she moved to the University of California, San Diego, where she worked as a postdoctoral researcher.

== Research and career ==
In 2011, Brès joined École Polytechnique Fédérale de Lausanne as head of the Photonics Systems Laboratory. In 2019, she was selected as one of 100 important women in Switzerland by the 100 Women and Thousands More campaign. Her research develops fibre and waveguide optics for communications, with a focus on nonlinear optical materials.

== Awards and honours ==
- 2012 European Research Council Starting Grant
- 2016 Early Career Women in Photonics Award
- 2017 European Research Council Consolidator Award
- 2019 European Research Council Proof of Concept Grants

== Selected publications ==
- Marcelo A. Soto; Mehdi Alem; Mohammad Amin Shoaie; Armand Vedadi; Camille-Sophie Brès; Luc Thévenaz; Thomas Schneider (1 January 2013). "Optical sinc-shaped Nyquist pulses of exceptional quality". Nature Communications. 4: 2898. Bibcode:2013NatCo...4.2898S. doi:10.1038/ncomms3898. ISSN 2041-1723. PMC 3863974. PMID 24301610. Wikidata Q37394277.
- Darren Rand; Ivan Glesk; Camille-Sophie Brès; et al. (1 February 2007). "Observation of temporal vector soliton propagation and collision in birefringent fiber". Physical Review Letters. 98 (5) 053902. doi:10.1103/physrevlett.98.053902. ISSN 0031-9007. PMID 17358859. Wikidata Q51048331.
- J B Coles; B P-P Kuo; N Alic; et al. (1 August 2010). "Bandwidth-efficient phase modulation techniques for stimulated Brillouin scattering suppression in fiber optic parametric amplifiers". Optics Express. 18 (17): 18138–18150. doi:10.1364/oe.18.018138. ISSN 1094-4087. PMID 20721202. Wikidata Q46678517.
