= Moïse Milliaud =

French rabbi and poet

Moïse Milliaud (Hebrew: משה דמיליאב; born c. 1760 in Carpentras) was a French rabbi and poet.

Milliaud was the author of Mishpat Emet, a philosophical essay on Job; Mateh Moshe, a rimed paraphrase of Ruth, with philosophical reflections; and Iggeret ha-Neḥamah, a rimed work purposing to console the reader in his sadness. All three works were published at Leghorn in 1787. In honour of Napoleon's birthday in 1806, Milliaud published with a French translation the Hebrew poem Mizmor Shir le-Napoleon. That same year, he was named representative for Vaucluse at the Assemblée des israélites de France et du royaume d'Italie, and a member of the Grand Sanhedrin.

== Publications ==
- Milliaud, Moïse (1787). ספר משפט אמת: והוא ויכוח כפי דעת חכמים ... על ספר איוב ומענות הפילוסופיים על ההשגחה [Sefer Mishpat Emet] (in Hebrew). Leghorn.
- Milliaud, Moïse (1787). ספר מטה משה: והוא עשתונות פלוסופיות וחרוזיות [Sefer Mateh Moshe] (in Hebrew). Leghorn.
- Milliaud, Moïse (1787). אגרת הנחמה [Iggeret ha-Neḥamah] (in Hebrew). Leghorn.
- Milliaud, Moïse (1806). מזמור שיר לנפולאון הגדול הקיכר והמלך / Cantique adressé à Napoléon le Grand, Empereur des François et Roi d'Italie [A Hymn to Napoleon the Great, the Emperor and King] (in Hebrew and French). Paris: Imprimerie Impériale.
