= Milhaud, Gard =

Milhaud
- Commune
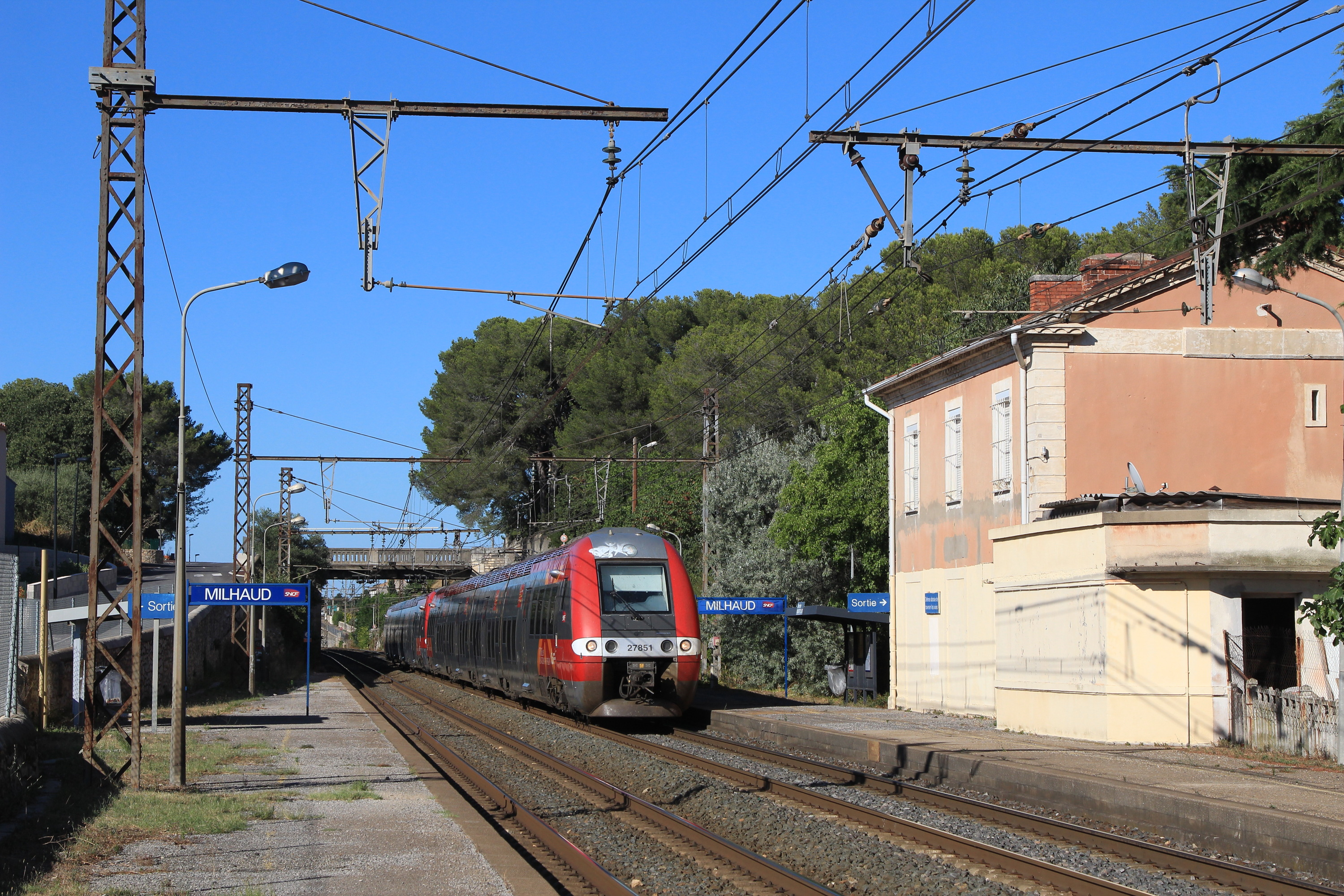
- A TER service passing through the Gare de Milhaud

- Coat of arms
- Location of Milhaud
- Location within France Location within Occitanie
- Coordinates: 43°47′27″N 4°18′29″E
- Country: France
- Region: Occitania
- Department: Gard
- Arrondissement: Nîmes
- Canton: Saint-Gilles
- Intercommunality: CA Nîmes Métropole

Government
  - Mayor (2020–2026): Jean-Luc Descloux
- Area^{1}: 18.25 km^{2} (7.05 sq mi)
- Elevation: 32 m (105 ft)
- Highest elevation: 122 m (400 ft)
- Lowest elevation: 15 m (49 ft)
- Population (2023): 6,297
  - Density: 345.0/km^{2} (893.7/sq mi)
- Time zone: UTC+01:00 (CET)
  - Summer (DST): UTC+02:00 (CEST)
- INSEE/Postal code: 30169 /30540
- ^{1} French Land Register data, which excludes lakes, ponds, glaciers > 1 km^{2} (0.386 sq mi or 247 acres) and river estuaries.

Milhaud (French pronunciation: [mijo]; Occitan: Milhau) is a commune in the Gard department in southern France. The place name Milhaud is derived from the Roman family name Aemilius (which has also produced the given name Emile) with the suffix -avus. Milhaud station has rail connections to Nîmes, Avignon and Montpellier.

== Population ==
Historical population
Year	Pop.	±% p.a.
1968	1,562	—
1975	2,225	+5.18%
1982	3,564	+6.96%
1990	4,855	+3.94%
1999	4,874	+0.04%
2007	5,578	+1.70%
2012	5,725	+0.52%
2017	5,636	−0.31%
2023	6,297	+1.87%
Source: INSEE

== See also ==
- Communes of the Gard department
- Costières de Nîmes AOC
