= 2021 Deceuninck–Quick-Step season =

Deceuninck–Quick-Step
- 2021 season
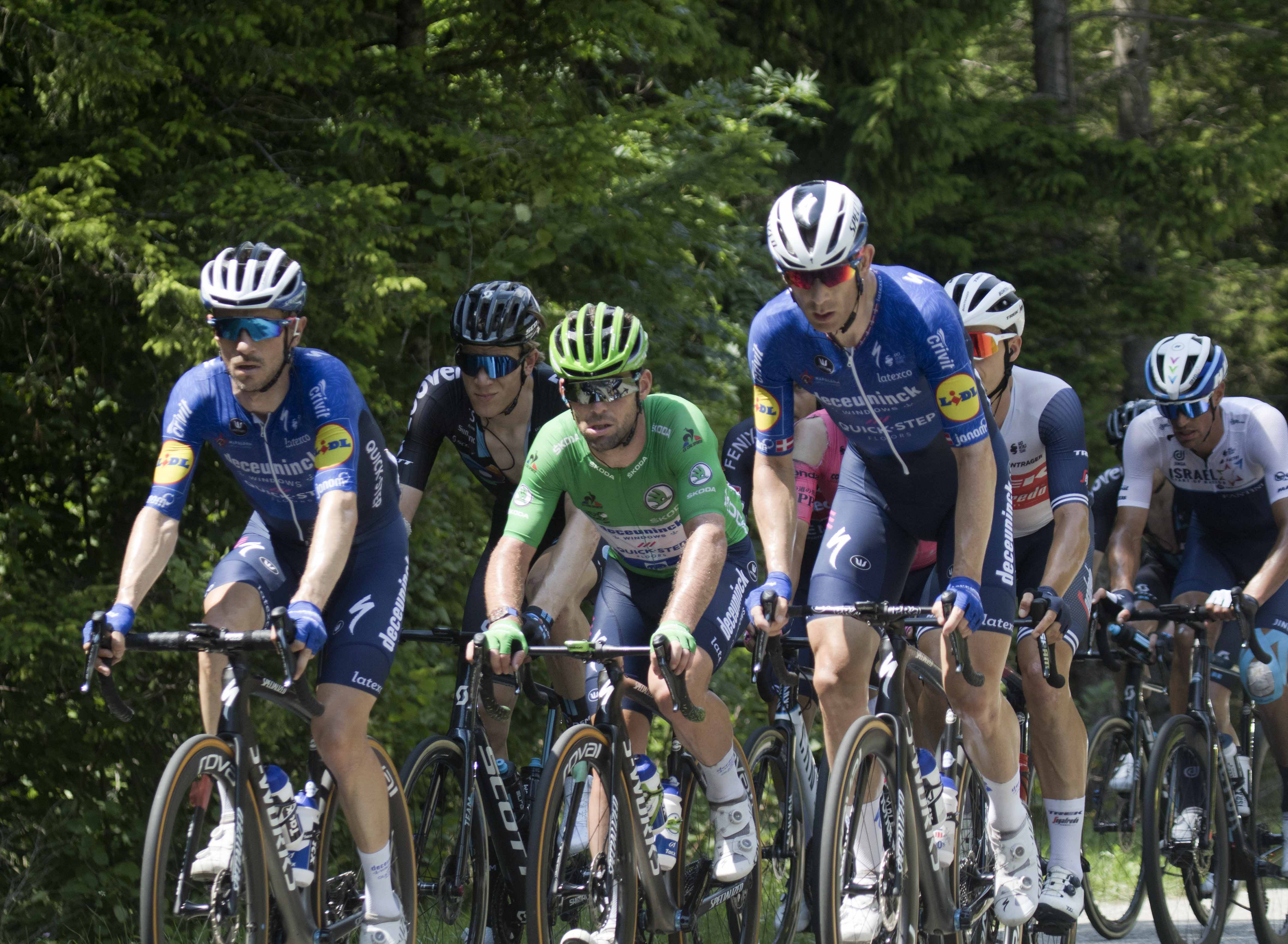
- Deceuninck–Quick-Step on Stage 14 of the Tour de France, with Mark Cavendish wearing the green jersey
- UCI code: DQT
- Status: UCI WorldTeam
- World Tour Rank: 1st
- Manager: Patrick Lefevere (BEL)
- Main sponsor(s): Deceuninck; Quick-Step Flooring
- Based: Belgium
- Bicycles: Specialized
- Groupset: Shimano

Season victories
- One-day races: 17
- Stage race overall: 4
- Stage race stages: 41
- World Championships: 1
- National Championships: 5
- Most wins: Mark Cavendish (GBR) (11)
- Best ranked rider: Julian Alaphilippe (FRA) (4th)
- Jersey

The 2021 season for Deceuninck–Quick-Step was the 19th season in the team's existence, and the third under the current name. The team has been a UCI WorldTeam since 2005, when the tier was first established.

The team's performances resulted in them winning the UCI World Team Ranking for the third time in four years.

== Team roster ==
As of 18 November 2021.

Rider	Date of birth
Julian Alaphilippe (FRA)	11 June 1992 (aged 28)
João Almeida (POR)	5 August 1998 (aged 22)
Shane Archbold (NZL)	2 February 1989 (aged 31)
Kasper Asgreen (DEN)	8 February 1995 (aged 25)
Andrea Bagioli (ITA)	23 March 1999 (aged 21)
Davide Ballerini (ITA)	21 September 1994 (aged 26)
Sam Bennett (IRL)	16 October 1990 (aged 30)
Mattia Cattaneo (ITA)	25 October 1990 (aged 30)
Rémi Cavagna (FRA)	10 August 1995 (aged 25)
Mark Cavendish (GBR)	21 May 1985 (aged 35)
Josef Černý (CZE)	11 May 1993 (aged 27)
Tim Declercq (BEL)	21 March 1989 (aged 31)
Dries Devenyns (BEL)	22 July 1983 (aged 37)
Remco Evenepoel (BEL)	25 January 2000 (aged 20)
Mikkel Frølich Honoré (DEN)	21 January 1997 (aged 23)
Ian Garrison (USA)	14 April 1998 (aged 22)
Álvaro Hodeg (COL)	16 September 1996 (aged 24)

Rider	Date of birth
Fabio Jakobsen (NED)	31 August 1996 (aged 24)
Iljo Keisse (BEL)	21 December 1982 (aged 38)
James Knox (GBR)	4 November 1995 (aged 25)
Yves Lampaert (BEL)	10 April 1991 (aged 29)
Fausto Masnada (ITA)	6 November 1993 (aged 27)
Michael Mørkøv (DEN)	30 April 1985 (aged 35)
Jason Osborne (Note: Osborne, an Olympic medalist in rowing and the inaugural UCI Cycling Esports World Champion, joined as a stagiaire on 1 September.) (GER)	20 March 1994 (aged 26)
Florian Sénéchal (FRA)	10 July 1993 (aged 27)
Pieter Serry (BEL)	21 November 1988 (aged 32)
Stijn Steels (BEL)	21 August 1989 (aged 31)
Jannik Steimle (GER)	4 April 1996 (aged 24)
Zdeněk Štybar (CZE)	11 December 1985 (aged 35)
Bert Van Lerberghe (BEL)	29 September 1992 (aged 28)
Stan Van Tricht (Note: Van Tricht joined as a stagiaire from SEG Racing Academy on 3 August.) (BEL)	20 September 1999 (aged 21)
Ilan Van Wilder (Note: After a contractual dispute between Van Wilder and Team DSM, his contracted was terminated and he joined Deceuninck–Quick-Step with immediate effect on 18 November.) (BEL)	14 May 2000 (aged 20)
Mauri Vansevenant (BEL)	1 June 1999 (aged 21)

Riders who joined the team for the 2021 season

Rider	2020 team
Mark Cavendish	Bahrain–McLaren
Josef Černý	CCC Team

Riders who left the team during or after the 2020 season

Rider	2021 team
Bob Jungels	AG2R Citroën Team

== Season victories ==
Date	Race	Competition	Rider	Country	Location	Ref.
11 February	Tour de la Provence, Stage 1	UCI Europe Tour; UCI ProSeries	Davide Ballerini (ITA)	France	Six-Fours-les-Plages	
12 February	Tour de la Provence, Stage 2	UCI Europe Tour; UCI ProSeries	Davide Ballerini (ITA)	France	Manosque	
14 February	Tour de la Provence, Points classification	UCI Europe Tour; UCI ProSeries	Davide Ballerini (ITA)	France		
24 February	UAE Tour, Stage 4	UCI World Tour	Sam Bennett (IRL)	United Arab Emirates	Al Marjan Island	
26 February	UAE Tour, Stage 6	UCI World Tour	Sam Bennett (IRL)	United Arab Emirates	Palm Jumeirah	
27 February	Omloop Het Nieuwsblad	UCI World Tour	Davide Ballerini (ITA)	Belgium	Ninove	
28 February	Royal Bernard Drôme Classic	UCI Europe Tour; UCI ProSeries	Andrea Bagioli (ITA)	France	Eurre	
7 March	GP Industria & Artigianato di Larciano	UCI Europe Tour; UCI ProSeries	Mauri Vansevenant (BEL)	Italy	Larciano	
7 March	Paris–Nice, Stage 1	UCI World Tour	Sam Bennett (IRL)	France	Saint-Cyr-l'École	
11 March	Paris–Nice, Stage 5	UCI World Tour	Sam Bennett (IRL)	France	Bollène	
11 March	Tirreno–Adriatico, Stage 2	UCI World Tour	Julian Alaphilippe (FRA)	Italy	Chiusdino	
24 March	Classic Brugge–de Panne	UCI World Tour	Sam Bennett (IRL)	Belgium	De Panne	
26 March	E3 Saxo Bank Classic	UCI World Tour	Kasper Asgreen (DEN)	Belgium	Harelbeke	
27 March	Settimana Internazionale di Coppi e Bartali, Stage 5	UCI Europe Tour	Mikkel Frølich Honoré (DEN)	Italy	Forlì	
28 March	Volta a Catalunya, Young rider classification	UCI World Tour	João Almeida (POR)	Spain		
4 April	Tour of Flanders	UCI World Tour	Kasper Asgreen (DEN)	Belgium	Oudenaarde	
9 April	Tour of the Basque Country, Stage 5	UCI World Tour	Mikkel Frølich Honoré (DEN)	Spain	Ondarroa	
12 April	Presidential Tour of Turkey, Stage 2	UCI Europe Tour; UCI ProSeries	Mark Cavendish (GBR)	Turkey	Konya	
13 April	Presidential Tour of Turkey, Stage 3	UCI Europe Tour; UCI ProSeries	Mark Cavendish (GBR)	Turkey	Alanya	
14 April	Presidential Tour of Turkey, Stage 4	UCI Europe Tour; UCI ProSeries	Mark Cavendish (GBR)	Turkey	Kemer	
18 April	Presidential Tour of Turkey, Stage 8	UCI Europe Tour; UCI ProSeries	Mark Cavendish (GBR)	Turkey	Kuşadası	
21 April	La Flèche Wallonne	UCI World Tour	Julian Alaphilippe (FRA)	Belgium	Mur de Huy	
2 May	Tour de Romandie, Stage 5 (ITT)	UCI World Tour	Remi Cavagna (FRA)	Switzerland	Fribourg	
5 May	Volta ao Algarve, Stage 1	UCI Europe Tour; UCI ProSeries	Sam Bennett (IRL)	Portugal	Portimão	
7 May	Volta ao Algarve, Stage 3	UCI Europe Tour; UCI ProSeries	Sam Bennett (IRL)	Portugal	Tavira	
8 May	Volta ao Algarve, Stage 4	UCI Europe Tour; UCI ProSeries	Kasper Asgreen (DEN)	Portugal	Lagoa	
9 May	Volta ao Algarve, Points classification	UCI Europe Tour; UCI ProSeries	Sam Bennett (IRL)	Portugal		
10 June	Tour of Belgium, Stage 2 (ITT)	UCI Europe Tour; UCI ProSeries	Remco Evenepoel (BEL)	Belgium	Knokke-Heist	
13 June	Tour of Belgium, Stage 5	UCI Europe Tour; UCI ProSeries	Mark Cavendish (GBR)	Belgium	Beringen	
13 June	Tour of Belgium, Overall	UCI Europe Tour; UCI ProSeries	Remco Evenepoel (BEL)	Belgium		
26 June	Tour de France, Stage 1	UCI World Tour	Julian Alaphilippe (FRA)	France	Landerneau	
29 June	Tour de France, Stage 4	UCI World Tour	Mark Cavendish (GBR)	France	Fougères	
1 July	Tour de France, Stage 6	UCI World Tour	Mark Cavendish (GBR)	France	Châteauroux	
6 July	Tour de France, Stage 10	UCI World Tour	Mark Cavendish (GBR)	France	Valence	
9 July	Tour de France, Stage 13	UCI World Tour	Mark Cavendish (GBR)	France	Carcassonne	
18 July	Tour de France, Points classification	UCI World Tour	Mark Cavendish (GBR)	France		
21 July	Tour de Wallonie, Stage 2	UCI Europe Tour; UCI ProSeries	Fabio Jakobsen (NED)	Belgium	Zolder	
24 July	Tour de Wallonie, Stage 5	UCI Europe Tour; UCI ProSeries	Fabio Jakobsen (NED)	Belgium	Quaregnon	
29 July	Tour de l'Ain, Stage 1	UCI Europe Tour	Álvaro Hodeg (COL)	France	Bourg-en-Bresse	
31 July	Tour de l'Ain, Young rider classification	UCI Europe Tour	Andrea Bagioli (ITA)	France		
4 August	Critérium International Marcolès en Chataigneraie Souvenir Lucien Cantourne	UCI Europe Tour	Rémi Cavagna (FRA)	France	Marcolès	
10 August	Tour de Pologne, Stage 2	UCI World Tour	João Almeida (POR)	Poland	Przemyśl	
12 August	Danmark Rundt, Stage 3	UCI Europe Tour; UCI ProSeries	Remco Evenepoel (BEL)	Denmark	Vejle	
12 August	Tour de Pologne, Stage 4	UCI World Tour	João Almeida (POR)	Poland	Bukovina Resort	
14 August	Danmark Rundt, Stage 5 (ITT)	UCI Europe Tour; UCI ProSeries	Remco Evenepoel (BEL)	Denmark	Frederiksberg	
14 August	Danmark Rundt, Overall	UCI Europe Tour; UCI ProSeries	Remco Evenepoel (BEL)	Denmark		
14 August	Danmark Rundt, Young rider classification	UCI Europe Tour; UCI ProSeries	Remco Evenepoel (BEL)	Denmark		
14 August	Tour de Pologne, Stage 6 (ITT)	UCI World Tour	Rémi Cavagna (FRA)	Poland	Katowice	
15 August	Tour de Pologne, Overall	UCI World Tour	João Almeida (POR)	Poland		
15 August	Tour de Pologne, Sprints classification	UCI World Tour	João Almeida (POR)	Poland		
15 August	Tour de Pologne, Team classification	UCI World Tour	(Note: The riders in the squad were João Almeida, Tim Declercq, Ian Garrison, Álvaro Hodeg, Mikkel Frølich Honoré, and Stijn Steels.)	Poland		
17 August	Vuelta a España, Stage 4	UCI World Tour	Fabio Jakobsen (NED)	Spain	Molina de Aragón	
20 August	Grote Prijs Marcel Kint	UCI Europe Tour	Álvaro Hodeg (COL)	Belgium	Kortrijk	
21 August	Vuelta a España, Stage 8	UCI World Tour	Fabio Jakobsen (NED)	Spain	La Manga del Mar Menor	
22 August	Crito'Star	UCI Europe Tour	Rémi Cavagna (FRA)	France	Choisy-le-Roi	
26 August	Druivenkoers Overijse	UCI Europe Tour	Remco Evenepoel (BEL)	Belgium	Overijse	
27 August	Vuelta a España, Stage 13	UCI World Tour	Florian Sénéchal (FRA)	Spain	Villanueva de la Serena	
28 August	Brussels Cycling Classic	UCI Europe Tour; UCI ProSeries	Remco Evenepoel (BEL)	Belgium	Brussels	
31 August	Vuelta a España, Stage 16	UCI World Tour	Fabio Jakobsen (NED)	Spain	Santa Cruz de Bezana	
5 September	Vuelta a España, Points classification	UCI World Tour	Fabio Jakobsen (NED)	Spain		
11 September	Tour of Britain, Stage 7	UCI Europe Tour; UCI ProSeries	Yves Lampaert (BEL)	United Kingdom	Edinburgh	
12 September	Tour of Britain, Team classification	UCI Europe Tour; UCI ProSeries	(Note: The riders in the squad were Julian Alaphilippe, Davide Ballerini, Mark Cavendish, Tim Declercq, Mikkel Frølich Honoré, and Yves Lampaert.)	United Kingdom		
14 September	Tour de Luxembourg, Stage 1	UCI Europe Tour; UCI ProSeries	João Almeida (POR)	Luxembourg	Luxembourg City	
16 September	Okolo Slovenska, Stage 1	UCI Europe Tour	Álvaro Hodeg (COL)	Slovakia	Košice	
17 September	Tour de Luxembourg, Stage 4 (ITT)	UCI Europe Tour; UCI ProSeries	Mattia Cattaneo (ITA)	Luxembourg	Dudelange	
17 September	Okolo Slovenska, Stage 2	UCI Europe Tour	Jannik Steimle (GER)	Slovakia	Dolný Kubín	
18 September	Tour de Luxembourg, Overall	UCI Europe Tour; UCI ProSeries	João Almeida (POR)	Luxembourg		
18 September	Tour de Luxembourg, Points classification	UCI Europe Tour; UCI ProSeries	João Almeida (POR)	Luxembourg		
18 September	Tour de Luxembourg, Young rider classification	UCI Europe Tour; UCI ProSeries	João Almeida (POR)	Luxembourg		
18 September	Tour de Luxembourg, Team classification	UCI Europe Tour; UCI ProSeries	(Note: The riders in the squad were João Almeida, Mattia Cattaneo, Dries Devenyns, Fausto Masnada, Pieter Serry, and Mauri Vansevenant.)	Luxembourg		
18 September	Primus Classic	UCI Europe Tour; UCI ProSeries	Florian Sénéchal (FRA)	Belgium	Haacht	
19 September	Gooikse Pijl	UCI Europe Tour	Fabio Jakobsen (NED)	Belgium	Gooik	
29 September	Eurométropole Tour	UCI Europe Tour; UCI ProSeries	Fabio Jakobsen (NED)	Belgium	Tournai	
3 October	Münsterland Giro	UCI Europe Tour; UCI ProSeries	Mark Cavendish (GBR)	Germany	Münster	
4 October	Coppa Bernocchi	UCI Europe Tour; UCI ProSeries	Remco Evenepoel (BEL)	Italy	Legnano	

== National, Continental, and World Champions ==
Date	Discipline	Jersey	Rider	Country	Location	Ref.
16 June	Belgian National Time Trial Championships		Yves Lampaert (BEL)	Belgium	Ingelmunster	
17 June	Czech National Time Trial Championships		Josef Černý (CZE)	Slovakia (Note: The Czech and Slovak national championships were held together in Slovakia.)	Podlužany	
17 June	Danish National Time Trial Championships		Kasper Asgreen (DEN)	Denmark	Give	
18 June	Portuguese National Time Trial Championships		João Almeida (POR)	Portugal	Castelo Branco	
20 June	French National Road Race Championships		Rémi Cavagna (FRA)	France	Épinal	
26 September	World Road Race Championships		Julian Alaphilippe (FRA)	Belgium	Leuven	
