= 2021 in men's road cycling =

2021 in men's road cycling includes the 2021 men's bicycle races governed by the Union Cycliste Internationale. The races are part of the UCI Road Calendar.

== World Championships ==
The Road World Championships are set to be held in Flanders, Belgium from 18–26 September 2021.

Events at the 2021 UCI Road World Championships
Race	Date	Winner	Second	Third	Ref
Individual Time Trial	19 September	(Italy) Filippo Ganna (ITA)	(Belgium) Wout van Aert (BEL)	(Belgium) Remco Evenepoel (BEL)	
Road Race	26 September	Julian Alaphilippe (FRA)	(Netherlands) Dylan van Baarle (NED)	(Denmark) Michael Valgren (DEN)	

== Olympics ==
The 2020 Summer Olympics were originally scheduled to be held in Tokyo, Japan in July and August 2020. Due to the COVID-19 pandemic, the games were postponed to 23 July – 8 August 2021.

Road cycling events at the Summer Olympics
Race	Date	Gold	Silver	Bronze	Ref
(International Olympic Committee) Individual Time Trial	28 July	Primož Roglič (SLO)	Tom Dumoulin (NED)	Rohan Dennis (AUS)	
(International Olympic Committee) Road Race	24 July	Richard Carapaz (ECU)	Wout van Aert (BEL)	Tadej Pogačar (SLO)	

== Grand Tours ==
Grand Tours during the 2021 season
Race	Date	Winner	Second	Third	Ref
(Italy) Giro d'Italia	8–30 May	Egan Bernal (COL)	Damiano Caruso (ITA)	Simon Yates (GBR)	
Tour de France	26 June – 18 July	Tadej Pogačar (SLO)	Jonas Vingegaard (DEN)	Richard Carapaz (ECU)	
(Spain) Vuelta a España	14 August – 5 September	Primož Roglič (SLO)	Enric Mas (ESP)	Jack Haig (AUS)	

== UCI World Tour ==
2021 UCI World Tour Races
Race	Date	Winner	Second	Third	Ref
(Australia) Tour Down Under	19–24 January	Cancelled due to the COVID-19 pandemic			
(Australia) Cadel Evans Great Ocean Road Race	31 January	Cancelled due to the COVID-19 pandemic			
(United Arab Emirates) UAE Tour	21–27 February	Tadej Pogačar (SLO)	Adam Yates (GBR)	João Almeida (POR)	
(Belgium) Omloop Het Nieuwsblad	27 February	Davide Ballerini (ITA)	Jake Stewart (GBR)	Sep Vanmarcke (BEL)	
(Italy) Strade Bianche	6 March	Mathieu van der Poel (NED)	Julian Alaphilippe (FRA)	Egan Bernal (COL)	
(France) Paris–Nice	7–14 March	Maximilian Schachmann (GER)	Aleksandr Vlasov (RUS)	Ion Izagirre (ESP)	
(Italy) Tirreno–Adriatico	10–16 March	Tadej Pogačar (SLO)	Wout van Aert (BEL)	Mikel Landa (ESP)	
(Italy) Milan–San Remo	20 March	Jasper Stuyven (BEL)	Caleb Ewan (AUS)	Wout van Aert (BEL)	
(Spain) Volta a Catalunya	22–28 March	Adam Yates (GBR)	Richie Porte (AUS)	Geraint Thomas (GBR)	
(Belgium) Classic Brugge–De Panne	24 March	Sam Bennett (IRL)	Jasper Philipsen (BEL)	Pascal Ackermann (GER)	
(Belgium) E3 Saxo Bank Classic	26 March	Kasper Asgreen (DEN)	Florian Sénéchal (FRA)	Mathieu van der Poel (NED)	
(Belgium) Gent–Wevelgem	28 March	Wout van Aert (BEL)	Giacomo Nizzolo (ITA)	Matteo Trentin (ITA)	
(Belgium) Dwars door Vlaanderen	31 March	Dylan van Baarle (NED)	Christophe Laporte (FRA)	Tim Merlier (BEL)	
(Belgium) Ronde van Vlaanderen	4 April	Kasper Asgreen (DEN)	Mathieu van der Poel (NED)	Greg Van Avermaet (BEL)	
(Spain) Tour of the Basque Country	5–10 April	Primož Roglič (SLO)	Jonas Vingegaard (DEN)	Tadej Pogačar (SLO)	
(Netherlands) Amstel Gold Race	18 April	Wout van Aert (BEL)	Tom Pidcock (GBR)	Maximilian Schachmann (GER)	
(Belgium) La Flèche Wallonne	21 April	Julian Alaphilippe (FRA)	Primož Roglič (SLO)	Alejandro Valverde (ESP)	
(Belgium) Liège–Bastogne–Liège	25 April	Tadej Pogačar (SLO)	Julian Alaphilippe (FRA)	David Gaudu (FRA)	
(Switzerland) Tour de Romandie	27 April – 2 May	Geraint Thomas (GBR)	Richie Porte (AUS)	Fausto Masnada (ITA)	
(France) Critérium du Dauphiné	30 May – 6 June	Richie Porte (AUS)	Alexey Lutsenko (KAZ)	Geraint Thomas (GBR)	
(Switzerland) Tour de Suisse	6–13 June	Richard Carapaz (ECU)	Rigoberto Urán (COL)	Jakob Fuglsang (DEN)	
(Spain) Clásica de San Sebastián	31 July	Neilson Powless (USA)	Matej Mohorič (SLO)	Mikkel Frølich Honoré (DEN)	
(Poland) Tour de Pologne	9–15 August	João Almeida (POR)	Matej Mohorič (SLO)	Michał Kwiatkowski (POL)	
(Germany) Hamburg Cyclassics	22 August	Cancelled due to the COVID-19 pandemic			
Bretagne Classic Ouest–France	29 August	Benoît Cosnefroy (FRA)	Julian Alaphilippe (FRA)	Mikkel Frølich Honoré (DEN)	
(Belgium) / (Netherlands) Benelux Tour	30 August – 5 September	Sonny Colbrelli (ITA)	Matej Mohorič (SLO)	Victor Campenaerts (BEL)	
(Canada) Grand Prix Cycliste de Québec	10 September	Cancelled due to the COVID-19 pandemic			
(Canada) Grand Prix Cycliste de Montréal	12 September	Cancelled due to the COVID-19 pandemic			
(Germany) Eschborn–Frankfurt	19 September (Note: The Eschborn–Frankfurt was scheduled for 1 May, but was postponed due to the COVID-19 pandemic in Germany.)	Jasper Philipsen (BEL)	John Degenkolb (GER)	Alexander Kristoff (NOR)	
(France) Paris–Roubaix	3 October (Note: Paris–Roubaix was scheduled for 11 April, but was postponed due to the COVID-19 pandemic in France.)	Sonny Colbrelli (ITA)	Florian Vermeersch (BEL)	Mathieu van der Poel (NED)	
(Italy) Il Lombardia	9 October	Tadej Pogačar (SLO)	Fausto Masnada (ITA)	Adam Yates (GBR)	
(China) Tour of Guangxi	14–19 October	Cancelled due to the COVID-19 pandemic			

== UCI ProSeries ==
2021 UCI ProSeries Races
Race	Date	Winner	Second	Third	Ref
(Argentina) Vuelta a San Juan	24–31 January	Cancelled			
(Malaysia) Tour de Langkawi	30 January – 6 February	Cancelled			
Tour of Oman	9–14 February	Cancelled			
(France) Tour de la Provence	11–14 February	Iván Sosa (COL)	Julian Alaphilippe (FRA)	Egan Bernal (COL)	
(Spain) Clásica de Almería	14 February	Giacomo Nizzolo (ITA)	Florian Sénéchal (FRA)	Martin Laas (EST)	
(France) Faun-Ardèche Classic	27 February	David Gaudu (FRA)	Clément Champoussin (FRA)	Hugh Carthy (GBR)	
(France) Royal Bernard Drôme Classic	28 February	Andrea Bagioli (ITA)	Daryl Impey (RSA)	Mikkel Frølich Honoré (DEN)	
(Belgium) Kuurne–Brussels–Kuurne	28 February	Mads Pedersen (DEN)	Anthony Turgis (FRA)	Tom Pidcock (GBR)	
(Italy) Trofeo Laigueglia	3 March	Bauke Mollema (NED)	Egan Bernal (COL)	Mauri Vansevenant (BEL)	
(Italy) GP Industria & Artigianato di Larciano	7 March	Mauri Vansevenant (BEL)	Bauke Mollema (NED)	Mikel Landa (ESP)	
(Belgium) Nokere Koerse	17 March	Ludovic Robeet (BEL)	Damien Gaudin (FRA)	Luca Mozzato (ITA)	
(Belgium) Bredene Koksijde Classic	19 March	Tim Merlier (BEL)	Mads Pedersen (DEN)	Florian Sénéchal (FRA)	
(Spain) GP Miguel Induráin	3 April	Alejandro Valverde (ESP)	Alexey Lutsenko (KAZ)	Luis León Sánchez (ESP)	
(Belgium) Scheldeprijs	7 April	Jasper Philipsen (BEL)	Sam Bennett (IRL)	Mark Cavendish (GBR)	
Presidential Tour of Turkey	11–18 April	José Manuel Díaz (ESP)	Jay Vine (AUS)	Eduardo Sepúlveda (ARG)	
(Belgium) Brabantse Pijl	14 April	Tom Pidcock (GBR)	Wout van Aert (BEL)	Matteo Trentin (ITA)	
(Spain) Volta a la Comunitat Valenciana	14–18 April (Note: The Volta a la Comunitat Valenciana was originally scheduled for 3–7 February but was postponed due to the COVID-19 pandemic.)	Stefan Küng (SUI)	Nelson Oliveira (POR)	Enric Mas (ESP)	
(Italy) Tour of the Alps	19–23 April	Simon Yates (GBR)	Pello Bilbao (ESP)	Aleksandr Vlasov (RUS)	
(United Kingdom) Tour de Yorkshire	29 April – 2 May	Cancelled			
(France) Four Days of Dunkirk	4–9 May	Cancelled			
(Portugal) Volta ao Algarve	5–9 May (Note: The Volta ao Algarve was originally scheduled for 17–21 February but was postponed due to the COVID-19 pandemic.)	João Rodrigues (POR)	Ethan Hayter (GBR)	Kasper Asgreen (DEN)	
(France) Tro-Bro Léon	16 May	Connor Swift (GBR)	Piet Allegaert (BEL)	Baptiste Planckaert (BEL)	
(Spain) Vuelta a Andalucía	18–22 May (Note: The Vuelta a Andalucía was originally scheduled for 17–21 February but was postponed due to the COVID-19 pandemic.)	Miguel Ángel López (COL)	Antwan Tolhoek (NED)	Julen Amezqueta (ESP)	
(France) Boucles de la Mayenne	27–30 May	Arnaud Démare (FRA)	Philipp Walsleben (GER)	Kristoffer Halvorsen (NOR)	
(Belgium) Dwars door het Hageland	5 June	Rasmus Tiller (NOR)	Danny van Poppel (NED)	Yves Lampaert (BEL)	
Tour of Belgium	9–13 June	Remco Evenepoel (BEL)	Yves Lampaert (BEL)	Gianni Marchand (BEL)	
Tour of Slovenia	9–13 June	Tadej Pogačar (SLO)	Diego Ulissi (ITA)	Matteo Sobrero (ITA)	
(Netherlands) ZLM Tour	9–13 June	Cancelled			
(Belgium) Tour de Wallonie	20–24 July	Quinn Simmons (USA)	Stan Dewulf (BEL)	Alexis Renard (FRA)	
(United States) Tour of Utah	26 July – 1 August	Cancelled			
(Spain) Vuelta a Burgos	3–7 August	Mikel Landa (ESP)	Fabio Aru (ITA)	Mark Padun (UKR)	
Arctic Race of Norway	5–8 August	Ben Hermans (BEL)	Odd Christian Eiking (NOR)	Victor Lafay (FRA)	
(Denmark) Danmark Rundt	10–14 August	Remco Evenepoel (BEL)	Mads Pedersen (DEN)	Mike Teunissen (NED)	
Tour of Norway	19–22 August (Note: The Tour of Norway was originally supposed to begin on 19 May but was reduced by two days. In April, the race was postponed from 21–24 May to 19–22 August.)	Ethan Hayter (GBR)	Ide Schelling (NED)	Mike Teunissen (NED)	
(Germany) Deutschland Tour	26–29 August	Nils Politt (GER)	Pascal Ackermann (GER)	Alexander Kristoff (NOR)	
(Belgium) Brussels Cycling Classic	28 August	Remco Evenepoel (BEL)	Aimé De Gendt (BEL)	Tosh Van der Sande (BEL)	
Tour of Austria	31 August – 4 September (Note: The 2021 Tour of Austria was scheduled for 26 June – 1 July, but was postponed due to the COVID-19 pandemic in Austria. Subsequently the race was cancelled due to financial reasons.)	Cancelled			
(United States) Maryland Cycling Classic	5 September	Cancelled			
(United Kingdom) Tour of Britain	5–12 September	Wout van Aert (BEL)	Ethan Hayter (GBR)	Julian Alaphilippe (FRA)	
(France) Grand Prix de Fourmies	12 September	Elia Viviani (ITA)	Pascal Ackermann (GER)	Fernando Gaviria (COL)	
Tour de Luxembourg	14–18 September	João Almeida (POR)	Marc Hirschi (SUI)	Mattia Cattaneo (ITA)	
(Belgium) Grand Prix de Wallonie	15 September	Christophe Laporte (FRA)	Warren Barguil (FRA)	Tosh Van der Sande (BEL)	
(Italy) Coppa Sabatini	16 September	Michael Valgren (DEN)	Sonny Colbrelli (ITA)	Mathieu Burgaudeau (FRA)	
(Belgium) Primus Classic	18 September	Florian Sénéchal (FRA)	Tosh Van der Sande (BEL)	Jasper Stuyven (BEL)	
(France) Grand Prix de Denain	21 September (Note: The Grand Prix de Denain was originally scheduled for 18 March but was postponed due to the COVID-19 pandemic.)	Jasper Philipsen (BEL)	Jordi Meeus (BEL)	Ben Swift (GBR)	
(Belgium) Eurométropole Tour	29 September (Note: The Eurométropole Tour was originally scheduled for 2 October but was rescheduled to avoid conflict with Paris–Roubaix, which was postponed to 3 October.)	Fabio Jakobsen (NED)	Jordi Meeus (BEL)	Mads Pedersen (DEN)	
(Italy) Giro dell'Emilia	2 October	Primož Roglič (SLO)	João Almeida (POR)	Michael Woods (CAN)	
(Germany) Münsterland Giro	3 October	Mark Cavendish (GBR)	Alexis Renard (FRA)	Morten Hulgaard (DEN)	
(Italy) Coppa Bernocchi	4 October	Remco Evenepoel (BEL)	Alessandro Covi (ITA)	Fausto Masnada (ITA)	
(Italy) Tre Valli Varesine	5 October	Alessandro De Marchi (ITA)	Davide Formolo (ITA)	Tadej Pogačar (SLO)	
(Italy) Milano-Torino	6 October	Primož Roglič (SLO)	Adam Yates (GBR)	João Almeida (POR)	
(Italy) Gran Piemonte	7 October	Matthew Walls (GBR)	Giacomo Nizzolo (ITA)	Olav Kooij (NED)	
(China) Tour of Taihu Lake	9–12 October	Cancelled			
(France) Paris–Tours	10 October	Arnaud Démare (FRA)	Franck Bonnamour (FRA)	Jasper Stuyven (BEL)	
(France) Grand Prix du Morbihan	16 October (Note: The Grand Prix du Morbihan was originally scheduled for 15 May but was postponed due to the COVID-19 pandemic.)	Arne Marit (BEL)	Bryan Coquard (FRA)	Elia Viviani (ITA)	
Japan Cup	17 October	Cancelled			

== Championships ==
2021 Continental Championships
Championships	Race	Date	Winner	Second	Third	Ref
African Championships; Egypt	Team Time Trial	2 March	South Africa	Rwanda	Algeria	
African Championships; Egypt	Team Time Trial	2 March	Gustav Basson; Ryan Gibbons; Kent Main; Jason Oosthuizen	Joseph Areruya; Jean Eric Habimana; Moise Mugisha; Jean Bosco Nsengimana	Azzedine Lagab; Hamza Mansouri; Youcef Reguigui; Nassim Saidi	
African Championships; Egypt	Individual Time Trial	3 March	Ryan Gibbons (RSA)	Kent Main (RSA)	Moise Mugisha (RWA)	
African Championships; Egypt	Mixed Team Relay	4 March	South Africa	Rwanda	Ethiopia	
African Championships; Egypt	Mixed Team Relay	4 March	Frances Janse van Rensburg; Carla Oberholzer; Hayley Preen; Gustav Basson; Ryan Gibbons; Kent Main	Diane Ingabire; Valentine Nzayisenga; Jacqueline Tuyishime; Jean Eric Habimana; Moise Mugisha; Jean Bosco Nsengimana	Selam Amha; Mihiret Gebreyowhans; Taye Watango; Yared Beharu; Tsgabu Grmay; Sintayehu Kebede	
African Championships; Egypt	Road Race	6 March	Ryan Gibbons (RSA)	Nassim Saidi (ALG)	Youcef Reguigui (ALG)	
Pan American Championships; Dominican Republic	Individual Time Trial	13 August	Hector Quintana Vidal (CHI)	João Pedro Rossi (BRA)	Anderson Arboleda (COL)	
Pan American Championships; Dominican Republic	Road Race	15 August	Nelson Soto (COL)	Cristian Pita (ECU)	Sebastian Novoa (ECU)	
European Championships; Italy	Individual Time Trial	9 September	Stefan Küng (SUI)	Filippo Ganna (ITA)	Remco Evenepoel (BEL)	
European Championships; Italy	Road Race	12 September	Sonny Colbrelli (ITA)	Remco Evenepoel (BEL)	Benoît Cosnefroy (FRA)	
Oceania Championships; Australia	Individual Time Trial	Postponed due to the COVID-19 pandemic (Note: Originally scheduled for late 2020, the Oceania Cycling Confederation has yet to set new dates for the 2021 Oceania Championships.)				
Oceania Championships; Australia	Road Race	Postponed due to the COVID-19 pandemic				

== UCI Teams ==
=== UCI WorldTeams ===
The following nineteen teams have received a UCI WorldTour license for the 2021 season.

- (France) AG2R Citroën Team
- (Kazakhstan) Astana–Premier Tech
- (Germany) Bora–Hansgrohe
- (France) Cofidis
- (Belgium) Deceuninck–Quick-Step
- (United States) EF Education–Nippo
- (France) Groupama–FDJ
- (United Kingdom) INEOS Grenadiers
- (Belgium) Intermarché–Wanty–Gobert Matériaux
- Israel Start-Up Nation
- (Belgium) Lotto–Soudal
- (Spain) Movistar Team
- Team Bahrain Victorious
- (Australia) Team BikeExchange
- (Germany) Team DSM
- (Netherlands) Team Jumbo–Visma
- (South Africa) Team Qhubeka NextHash
- (United States) Trek–Segafredo
- (United Arab Emirates) UAE Team Emirates
