= Ralph Denk =

German cycling team manager and cyclist

Personal information
- Born: 1 November 1973 (age 52) Bad Aibling, Bavaria, Germany

Cycling career
- Sport: Cycling
- Current team: Red Bull–Bora–Hansgrohe
- Discipline: Road cycling
- Role: General manager

Managerial teams
- 2000–?: Ralph Denk Racing
- 2010–: Red Bull–Bora–Hansgrohe

Ralph Denk (born 1 November 1973) is a German cycling team manager, and former cyclist, who is the founder and manager of the Red Bull–Bora–Hansgrohe UCI WorldTeam cycling team. As a cyclist, Denk won multiple Bavarian Regional Championships.

== Career ==
Denk began cycling at the age of twelve. He won multiple Bavarian Regional Championships, and competed in stage races including the Bayern Rundfahrt. Predominately an amateur cyclist, Denk also rode as a professional cyclist in 1999. In 2000, Denk set up a bicycle shop and an eponymously named cycling team, Ralph Denk Racing. Ralph Denk Racing competed at the 2000 and 2001 UCI Mountain Bike World Cups, and prior to the 2005 season, Roel Paulissen signed for the team.

In late 2009, Denk founded cycling team Team NetApp (now known as Bora–Hansgrohe); Team NetApp started competing in the 2010 season. In 2012, the team was first awarded a wildcard place at the Giro d'Italia, the team's first Grand Tour entry. In 2013, they received a wildcard entry for the Vuelta a España, and in 2014, the team was awarded its first wildcard place at the Tour de France. In 2019, Denk criticised the World Anti-Doping Agency for granting too many drugs exemptions for cortisone and salbutamol.

After Denk chose to withdraw Bora–Hansgrohe from the 2020 Bretagne Classic Ouest–France due to a positive COVID-19 test, Denk was critical of the COVID-19 testing process, as the rider's turned out to be a false positive. He suggested that the Union Cycliste Internationale should be using A and B sample tests, as they do for drug testing. Prior to the 2020 Tour de France, Denk signed a contract extension with Bora–Hansgrohe's sponsors until 2024. In November 2020, Denk was critical of suggestions that the 2021 UCI World Tour would be primarily in Europe due to the COVID-19 pandemic. In March 2021, Denk was critical of race protocols after Bora-Hansgrohe were forced to miss the Gent–Wevelgem and Dwars door Vlaanderen events after 17 members of the team were put into isolation following one positive test at the E3 Saxo Bank Classic.
