= 2021 UCI World Tour =

Road cycling competitions

2021 UCI WorldTour
- Eleventh edition of the UCI WorldTour

Details
- Dates: 21 February – 9 October
- Location: Europe; United Arab Emirates
- Races: 29

The 2021 UCI World Tour was a series of races that included twenty-nine road cycling events throughout the 2021 cycling season. The tour started with the opening stage of the UAE Tour on 21 February, and concluded with Il Lombardia on 9 October.

== Events ==
The 2021 calendar was announced in the autumn of 2020.

Races in the 2021 UCI World Tour
Race	Date	Winner	Second	Third
(United Arab Emirates) UAE Tour	21–27 February	Tadej Pogačar (SLO)	Adam Yates (GBR)	João Almeida (POR)
(Belgium) Omloop Het Nieuwsblad	27 February	Davide Ballerini (ITA)	Jake Stewart (GBR)	Sep Vanmarcke (BEL)
(Italy) Strade Bianche	6 March	Mathieu van der Poel (NED)	Julian Alaphilippe (FRA)	Egan Bernal (COL)
(France) Paris–Nice	7–14 March	Max Schachmann (GER)	Aleksandr Vlasov (RUS)	Ion Izagirre (ESP)
(Italy) Tirreno–Adriatico	10–16 March	Tadej Pogačar (SLO)	Wout van Aert (BEL)	Mikel Landa (ESP)
(Italy) Milan–San Remo	20 March	Jasper Stuyven (BEL)	Caleb Ewan (AUS)	Wout van Aert (BEL)
(Spain) Volta a Catalunya	22–28 March	Adam Yates (GBR)	Richie Porte (AUS)	Geraint Thomas (GBR)
(Belgium) Classic Brugge–De Panne	24 March	Sam Bennett (IRL)	Jasper Philipsen (BEL)	Pascal Ackermann (GER)
(Belgium) E3 Saxo Bank Classic	26 March	Kasper Asgreen (DEN)	Florian Sénéchal (FRA)	Mathieu van der Poel (NED)
(Belgium) Gent–Wevelgem	28 March	Wout van Aert (BEL)	Giacomo Nizzolo (ITA)	Matteo Trentin (ITA)
(Belgium) Dwars door Vlaanderen	31 March	Dylan van Baarle (NED)	Christophe Laporte (FRA)	Tim Merlier (BEL)
(Belgium) Tour of Flanders	4 April	Kasper Asgreen (DEN)	Mathieu van der Poel (NED)	Greg Van Avermaet (BEL)
(Spain) Tour of the Basque Country	5–10 April	Primož Roglič (SLO)	Jonas Vingegaard (DEN)	Tadej Pogačar (SLO)
(Netherlands) Amstel Gold Race	18 April	Wout van Aert (BEL)	Tom Pidcock (GBR)	Max Schachmann (GER)
(Belgium) La Flèche Wallonne	21 April	Julian Alaphilippe (FRA)	Primož Roglič (SLO)	Alejandro Valverde (ESP)
(Belgium) Liège–Bastogne–Liège	25 April	Tadej Pogačar (SLO)	Julian Alaphilippe (FRA)	David Gaudu (FRA)
(Switzerland) Tour de Romandie	27 April – 2 May	Geraint Thomas (GBR)	Richie Porte (AUS)	Fausto Masnada (ITA)
(Italy) Giro d'Italia	8–30 May	Egan Bernal (COL)	Damiano Caruso (ITA)	Simon Yates (GBR)
(France) Critérium du Dauphiné	30 May – 6 June	Richie Porte (AUS)	Alexey Lutsenko (KAZ)	Geraint Thomas (GBR)
(Switzerland) Tour de Suisse	6–13 June	Richard Carapaz (ECU)	Rigoberto Urán (COL)	Jakob Fuglsang (DEN)
Tour de France	26 June – 18 July	Tadej Pogačar (SLO)	Jonas Vingegaard (DEN)	Richard Carapaz (ECU)
(Spain) Clásica de San Sebastián	31 July	Neilson Powless (USA)	Matej Mohorič (SLO)	Mikkel Frølich Honoré (DEN)
(Poland) Tour de Pologne	9–15 August	João Almeida (POR)	Matej Mohorič (SLO)	Michał Kwiatkowski (POL)
(Spain) Vuelta a España	14 August – 5 September	Primož Roglič (SLO)	Enric Mas (ESP)	Jack Haig (AUS)
Bretagne Classic Ouest–France	29 August (Note: The Bretagne Classic Ouest–France was initially scheduled for 22 August.)	Benoît Cosnefroy (FRA)	Julian Alaphilippe (FRA)	Mikkel Frølich Honoré (DEN)
(Belgium) / (Netherlands) Benelux Tour	30 August – 5 September	Sonny Colbrelli (ITA)	Matej Mohorič (SLO)	Victor Campenaerts (BEL)
(Germany) Eschborn–Frankfurt	19 September (Note: The Eschborn–Frankfurt was initially scheduled for 1 May, but was postponed due to the COVID-19 pandemic in Germany.)	Jasper Philipsen (BEL)	John Degenkolb (GER)	Alexander Kristoff (NOR)
(France) Paris–Roubaix	3 October (Note: Paris–Roubaix was initially scheduled for 11 April, but was postponed due to the COVID-19 pandemic in France.)	Sonny Colbrelli (ITA)	Florian Vermeersch (BEL)	Mathieu van der Poel (NED)
(Italy) Il Lombardia	9 October	Tadej Pogačar (SLO)	Fausto Masnada (ITA)	Adam Yates (GBR)

=== Cancelled events ===
Due to COVID-19-related logistical concerns raised by teams regarding travel to Australia (including strict quarantine requirements), the Tour Down Under (19–24 January) and the Cadel Evans Great Ocean Road Race (31 January) were cancelled. The organisers of the Tour Down Under held a "domestic cycling festival" known as the Santos Festival of Cycling in its place, which featured races in various disciplines (including a National Road Series event). In June, the Grand Prix Cycliste de Québec (10 September) and the Grand Prix Cycliste de Montréal (12 September) were cancelled due to the COVID-19 pandemic in Canada. In August, the Hamburg Cyclassics (15 August) and the Tour of Guangxi (14–19 October) were cancelled at the request of their respective organisers, due to the COVID-19 pandemic.

In addition, and for reasons not entirely related to the pandemic, the organisers of the Tour of California in the United States as well as those of the Prudential RideLondon–Surrey Classic in the United Kingdom did not request to register either of their respective events for the 2021 calendar.

== Teams ==
The nineteen WorldTeams were automatically invited to compete in events, with Alpecin–Fenix (the best performing UCI ProTeam in 2020) also receiving an automatic invitation. Other teams were invited by the organisers of each race.

- AG2R Citroën Team
- Astana–Premier Tech
- Bora–Hansgrohe
- Cofidis
- Deceuninck–Quick-Step
- EF Education–Nippo
- Groupama–FDJ
- Ineos Grenadiers
- Intermarché–Wanty–Gobert Matériaux
- Israel Start-Up Nation
- Lotto–Soudal
- Movistar Team
- Team Bahrain Victorious
- Team BikeExchange
- Team DSM
- Team Jumbo–Visma
- Team Qhubeka NextHash
- Trek–Segafredo
- UAE Team Emirates
