= Gianni Vermeersch =

Belgian cyclist

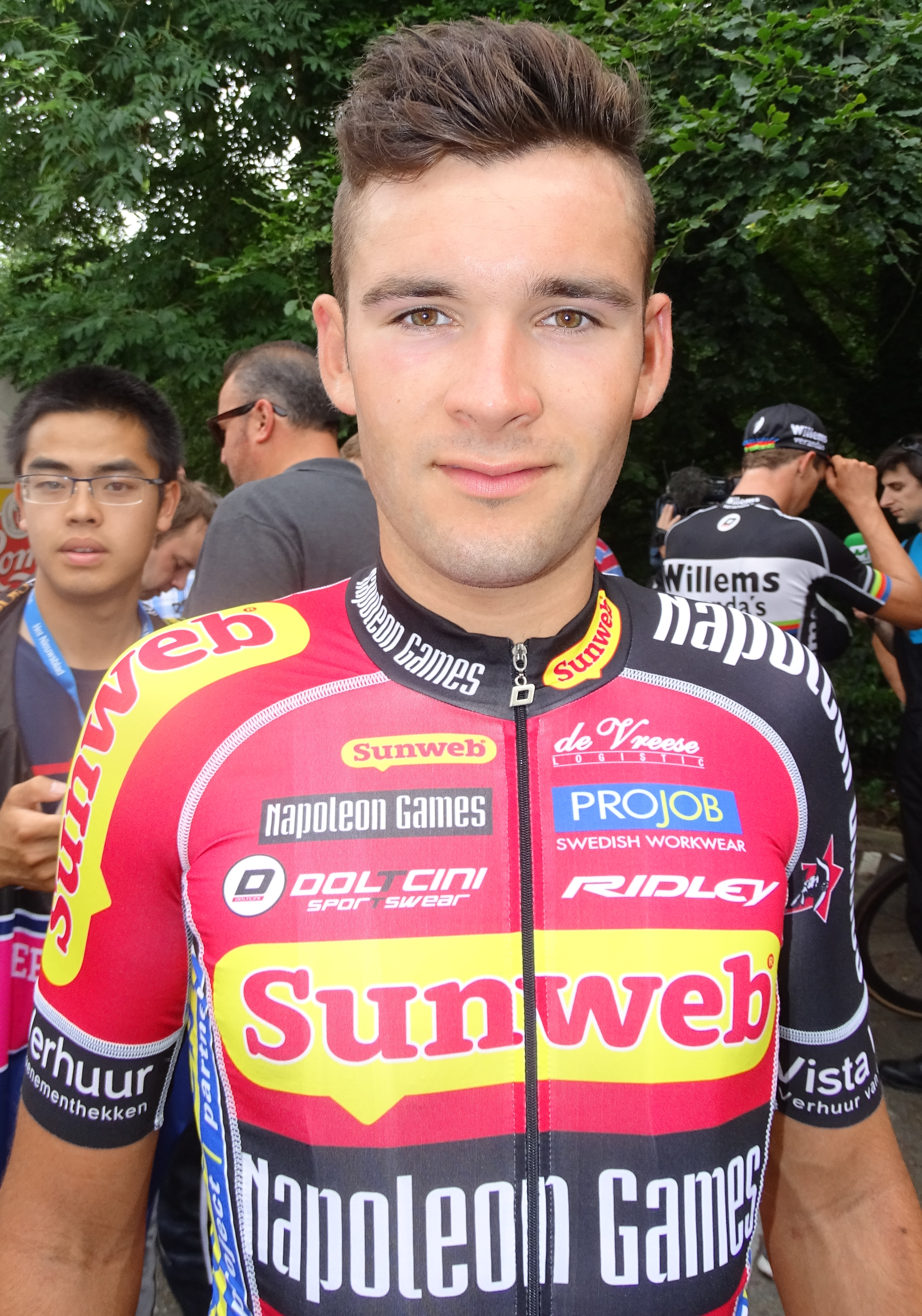
- Vermeersch in 2015.

Personal information
- Full name: Gianni Vermeersch
- Born: 19 November 1992 (age 33) Roeselare, Belgium
- Height: 1.73 m (5 ft 8 in)
- Weight: 68 kg (150 lb)

Cycling career
- Sport: Cycling
- Current team: Red Bull–Bora–Hansgrohe
- Disciplines: Cyclo-cross; Gravel; Road
- Role: Rider
- Rider type: Classics specialist

Amateur team
- 2016–2018: Steylaerts–Verona (cyclo-cross)

Professional teams
- 2011–2013: BKCP–Powerplus
- 2013–2016: Sunweb–Napoleon Games
- 2016: Verandas Willems (road)
- 2017–2025: Beobank–Corendon (road)
- 2019: Steylaerts–777 (cyclo-cross)
- 2019–2021: Creafin–Fristads (cyclo-cross)
- 2026–: Red Bull–Bora–Hansgrohe (road)

Major wins
- Gravel World Championships (2022) National Championships (2024) Road One-day races and Classics Dwars door het Hageland (2024)
Medal record
Men's gravel cycling
World Championships
Gold medal – first place	2022 Veneto	Elite

Gianni Vermeersch (born 19 November 1992) is a Belgian professional cyclist, who rides for UCI WorldTeam Red Bull–Bora–Hansgrohe in road racing. In 2022, Vermeersch became the inaugural winner of the men's race at the UCI Gravel World Championships.

== Major results ==
=== Major championships timeline ===
Event		2015	2016	2017	2018	2019	2020	2021	2022	2023	2024
World Championships	Cyclo-cross	7	—	8	—	10	—	12	—	—	—
World Championships	Road	—	—	—	—	—	—	—	—	—	—
World Championships	Gravel	Event did not exist							1	11	5
European Championships	Cyclo-cross	15	—	26	9	11	—	—	—	—	—
European Championships	Gravel	Event did not exist								4	—
European Championships	Road	DNE	—	—	—	—	—	DNF	—	—	—
National Championships	Cyclo-cross	11	—	9	11	7	6	6	5	—	DNF
National Championships	Gravel	Event did not exist								3	1
National Championships	Road	DNF	DNF	11	DNF	95	59	80	66	77	22

=== Cyclo-cross ===
2008–2009
1st Junior Eernegem
2009–2010
1st Junior Middelkerke
2nd Junior Bredene
Junior Gazet van Antwerpen

3rd Hasselt

3rd Junior Erpe-Mere
3rd Junior Tervuren
5th UCI World Junior Championships
2011–2012
2nd National Under-23 Championships
2012–2013
UCI Under-23 World Cup

2nd Hoogerheide
3rd Rome

Bpost Bank Trofee

2nd Baal
3rd Essen

2nd National Under-23 Championships
3rd Overall Under-23 Superprestige

2nd Hoogstraten
3rd Ruddervoorde

2013–2014
UCI Under-23 World Cup

2nd Tábor
3rd Koksijde

Bpost Bank Trofee

2nd Ronse
3rd Hasselt

3rd Overall Under-23 Superprestige

3rd Ruddervoorde
3rd Hamme-Zogge
3rd Gavere
3rd Gieten

3rd UEC European Under-23 Championships
3rd Under-23 Kalmthout
2014–2015
2nd Versluys
UCI World Cup

3rd Hoogerheide

3rd Maldegem
2016–2017
2nd Iowa City
Brico Cross

3rd Versluys

UCI World Cup

5th Iowa City

2017–2018
1st Iowa City
2018–2019
Toi Toi Cup

2nd Uničov
2nd Mladá Boleslav

Brico Cross

2nd Essen

2nd Gullegem
2nd Ardooie
Superprestige

3rd Boom

UCI World Cup

5th Hoogerheide

2019–2020
1st Ardooie
1st Iowa City
Ethias Cross

3rd Bredene

3rd Otegem
UCI World Cup

4th Waterloo
4th Iowa City
5th Heusden-Zolder

2023–2024
Exact Cross

2nd Loenhout
2nd Zonnebeke

=== Gravel ===
2022
1st UCI World Championships
3rd Serenissima
2023
2nd Serenissima
3rd National Championships
4th UEC European Championships
2024
1st National Championships
5th UCI World Championships

=== Road ===
2015
3rd Circuit de Wallonie
3rd Omloop Het Nieuwsblad Beloften
2016
2nd Omloop Het Nieuwsblad Beloften
9th Grand Prix Pino Cerami
9th Grand Prix de la ville de Pérenchies
10th Grote Prijs Jef Scherens
2017 (1 pro win)
1st Slag om Norg
3rd Ronde van Limburg
2018
3rd Dwars door het Hageland
2019
1st Prologue (TTT) Tour Alsace
2nd Druivenkoers Overijse
5th Grote Prijs Jef Scherens
9th Dwars door het Hageland
2020 (1)
1st Antwerp Port Epic
3rd Dwars door het Hageland
4th Overall Tour of Antalya
6th Druivenkoers Overijse
8th Le Samyn
2021
3rd Grote Prijs Jef Scherens
4th Tour de Vendée
5th Grand Prix de Wallonie
6th Paris–Camembert
6th Druivenkoers Overijse
7th Tour of Flanders
9th E3 Saxo Bank Classic
10th Gent–Wevelgem
2022 (1)
1st Stage 5 Four Days of Dunkirk
2nd Antwerp Port Epic
2nd Dwars door het Hageland
2023
4th Egmont Cycling Race
6th Super 8 Classic
2024 (1)
1st Dwars door het Hageland
6th Paris–Roubaix
6th Druivenkoers Overijse
2025
2nd Grand Prix de Denain
7th Strade Bianche
2026
5th Strade Bianche
5th Clásica Jaén Paraíso Interior
8th E3 Saxo Classic
10th Tour of Flanders

==== Grand Tour general classification results timeline ====
Grand Tour	2019	2020	2021	2022	2023	2024	2025
Giro d'Italia	—	—	87	—	—	—	—
Tour de France	—	—	—	—	—	107	103
Vuelta a España	—	—	—	82	—	—	—

==== Classics results timeline ====
Monument	2019	2020	2021	2022	2023	2024	2025	2026
Milan–San Remo	—	—	24	—	81	57	—	—
Tour of Flanders	69	DNF	7	40	30	23	15	10
Paris–Roubaix	—	NH	15	58	11	6	DNF	
Liège–Bastogne–Liège	—	—	—	—	—	—	—	
Giro di Lombardia	—	—	—	—	—	—	—	
Classic	2019	2020	2021	2022	2023	2024	2025	2026
Strade Bianche	—	OTL	14	DNF	22	32	7	5
E3 Saxo Bank Classic	—	NH	9	29	—	—	16	8
Gent–Wevelgem	28	30	10	46	24	48	83	
Brabantse Pijl	23	—	—	—	DNF	—	—	
Bretagne Classic	—	13	—	—	—	—	33	
Grand Prix Cycliste de Québec	—	Not held		—	—	12	13	
Grand Prix Cycliste de Montréal	—	Not held		—	—	DNF	DNF	

Legend
—	Did not compete
DNF	Did not finish
OTL	Outside time limit
NH	Not held
