= 2022 Coppa Bernocchi =

- 2022 UCI ProSeries

Race details
- Dates: 3 October 2022
- Stages: 1
- Distance: 190.7 km (118.5 mi)
- Winning time: 4h 18' 01"

Results
	Winner	Davide Ballerini (ITA)	(Quick-Step Alpha Vinyl Team)
	Second	Corbin Strong (NZL)	(Israel–Premier Tech)
	Third	Stefano Oldani (ITA)	(Alpecin–Deceuninck)

The 2022 Coppa Bernocchi (also known as the Coppa Bernocchi – GP Banco BPM for sponsorship reasons) was the 103rd edition of the Coppa Bernocchi road cycling one day race, which was held in and around Legnano, Italy, on 3 October 2022.

== Teams ==
14 of the 19 UCI WorldTeams, nine UCI ProTeams, and two UCI Continental teams made up the 25 teams that participated in the race. All but five teams entered full squads of seven riders. In total, 175 riders started the race, of whom 109 finished.

UCI WorldTeams

- Astana Qazaqstan Team
- Bora–Hansgrohe
- Cofidis
- EF Education–EasyPost
- Groupama–FDJ
- INEOS Grenadiers
- Intermarché–Wanty–Gobert Matériaux
- Israel–Premier Tech
- Lotto–Soudal
- Movistar Team
- Quick-Step Alpha Vinyl Team
- Team BikeExchange–Jayco
- Trek–Segafredo
- UAE Team Emirates

UCI ProTeams

- AG2R Citroën Team
- Alpecin–Deceuninck
- Bardiani–CSF–Faizanè
- Bingoal Pauwels Sauces WB
- Caja Rural–Seguros RGA
- Drone Hopper–Androni Giocattoli
- Equipo Kern Pharma
- Eolo–Kometa
- Team TotalEnergies

UCI Continental Teams

- Team Corratec
- Work Service–Vitalcare–Vega

== Result ==
Result
Rank	Rider	Team	Time
1	Davide Ballerini (ITA)	Quick-Step Alpha Vinyl Team	4h 18' 01"
2	Corbin Strong (NZL)	Israel–Premier Tech	+ 0"
3	Stefano Oldani (ITA)	Alpecin–Deceuninck	+ 0"
4	Matteo Trentin (ITA)	UAE Team Emirates	+ 0"
5	Iván García Cortina (ESP)	Movistar Team	+ 0"
6	Robert Stannard (AUS)	Alpecin–Deceuninck	+ 0"
7	Christian Scaroni (ITA)	Astana Qazaqstan Team	+ 0"
8	Davide Bais (ITA)	Eolo–Kometa	+ 0"
9	Andrea Vendrame (ITA)	AG2R Citroën Team	+ 0"
10	Marijn van den Berg (NED)	EF Education–EasyPost	+ 0"
