= 2020 Le Samyn =

2020 UCI Europe Tour
- Official poster with previous winner Florian Sénéchal

Race details
- Dates: 3 March 2020
- Stages: 1
- Distance: 201.9 km (125.5 mi)
- Winning time: 4h 42' 02"

Results
	Winner	Hugo Hofstetter (FRA)	(Israel Start-Up Nation)
	Second	Aimé De Gendt (BEL)	(Circus–Wanty Gobert)
	Third	David Dekker (NED)	(SEG Racing Academy)

The 2020 Le Samyn was the 52nd edition of the Le Samyn road cycling one day race in Belgium. It was part of the 2020 UCI Europe Tour as a 1.1-rated event that started in Quaregnon and finished in Dour.

== Teams ==
Twenty-five teams, consisting of six UCI WorldTeams, ten UCI ProTeams, and nine UCI Continental teams participated in the race. Most teams entered with seven riders; however, AG2R La Mondiale, Akros–Excelsior–Thömus, Caja Rural–Seguros RGA, and Total Direct Énergie only entered six, and Lotto–Soudal only entered five. 101 of the 169 riders in the race finished.

UCI WorldTeams

- AG2R La Mondiale
- Deceuninck–Quick-Step
- Israel Start-Up Nation
- Lotto–Soudal
- NTT Pro Cycling
- Trek–Segafredo

UCI ProTeams

- Alpecin–Fenix
- Arkéa–Samsic
- B&B Hotels–Vital Concept
- Bingoal–Wallonie Bruxelles
- Caja Rural–Seguros RGA
- Circus–Wanty Gobert
- Riwal Readynez
- Sport Vlaanderen–Baloise
- Total Direct Énergie
- Uno-X Norwegian Development Team

UCI Continental Teams

- Akros–Excelsior–Thömus
- Canyon dhb p/b Soreen
- Équipe Continentale Groupama–FDJ
- Leopard Pro Cycling
- Metec–TKH
- Natura4Ever–Roubaix–Lille Métropole
- SEG Racing Academy
- Tarteletto–Isorex
- Vitus Pro Cycling Team p/b Brother UK

== Result ==
Result
Rank	Rider	Team	Time
1	Hugo Hofstetter (FRA)	Israel Start-Up Nation	4h 42' 02"
2	Aimé De Gendt (BEL)	Circus–Wanty Gobert	+ 0"
3	David Dekker (NED)	SEG Racing Academy	+ 0"
4	Clément Venturini (FRA)	AG2R La Mondiale	+ 0"
5	Florian Sénéchal (FRA)	Deceuninck–Quick-Step	+ 0"
6	Giacomo Nizzolo (ITA)	NTT Pro Cycling	+ 0"
7	Alex Kirsch (LUX)	Trek–Segafredo	+ 0"
8	Gianni Vermeersch (BEL)	Alpecin–Fenix	+ 0"
9	Tim Declercq (BEL)	Deceuninck–Quick-Step	+ 0"
10	Dries Van Gestel (BEL)	Total Direct Énergie	+ 0"
