= 2021 Gent–Wevelgem =

Cycling race

2021 UCI World Tour, race 10 of 29
- Event poster with previous winners Jolien D'Hoore and Mads Pedersen

Race details
- Dates: 28 March 2021
- Stages: 1
- Distance: 254 km (158 mi)
- Winning time: 5h 45' 11"

Results
	Winner	Wout van Aert (BEL)	(Team Jumbo–Visma)
	Second	Giacomo Nizzolo (ITA)	(Team Qhubeka Assos)
	Third	Matteo Trentin (ITA)	(UAE Team Emirates)

The 2021 Gent–Wevelgem – In Flanders Fields was a Belgian road cycling classic race that took place on 28 March 2021 over a distance of 254 kilometres between Ypres and Wevelgem. It was the 83rd edition of Gent–Wevelgem and the 10th event of the 2021 UCI World Tour. The winner was Wout van Aert of Team Jumbo–Visma.

== Teams ==
Twenty-five teams were invited to the race, including all nineteen UCI WorldTeams and six UCI ProTeams. The evening before the race, the Trek–Segafredo team of defending champion Mads Pedersen withdrew, following two positive tests for COVID-19. In addition, Bora–Hansgrohe have also been prevented from starting, due to COVID-19 guidelines in Belgium. Astana–Premier Tech and INEOS Grenadiers, with six riders each, were the only teams to not enter seven riders. Ultimately, 159 riders started the race, of which only 90 finished.

UCI WorldTeams

- AG2R Citroën Team
- Astana–Premier Tech
- ~~Bora–Hansgrohe~~
- Cofidis
- Deceuninck–Quick-Step
- EF Education–Nippo
- Groupama–FDJ
- INEOS Grenadiers
- Intermarché–Wanty–Gobert Matériaux
- Israel Start-Up Nation
- Lotto–Soudal
- Movistar Team
- Team Bahrain Victorious
- Team BikeExchange
- Team DSM
- Team Jumbo–Visma
- Team Qhubeka Assos
- ~~Trek–Segafredo~~
- UAE Team Emirates

UCI ProTeams

- Alpecin–Fenix
- Arkéa–Samsic
- B&B Hotels p/b KTM
- Bingoal Pauwels Sauces WB
- Sport Vlaanderen–Baloise
- Total Direct Énergie

== Race summary ==
Due to strong winds, some big names started attacking already with still 180 kilometres to go, with particularly Team BikeExchange pulling the peloton apart, causing a group of 21 riders to break away, namely Jack Bauer, Sam Bennett, Sven Erik Bystrøm, Sonny Colbrelli, Jasper De Buyst, Timothy Dupont, Imanol Erviti, Michał Gołaś, Stefan Küng, Jérémy Lecroq, Cyril Lemoine, Lluís Mas, Michael Matthews, Luka Mezgec, Giacomo Nizzolo, Robert Stannard, Jasha Sütterlin, Matteo Trentin, Wout van Aert, Nathan Van Hooydonck and Danny van Poppel. This group caught the four riders of the early breakaway, Daniel Arroyave, Stefan Bissegger, Yevgeniy Fedorov and Laurenz Rex, creating a group of 25 which gained up to one minute lead over the peloton.

The group held the gap steady at roughly one minute for hours, but going through the hilly section, several riders in the peloton tried to bridge the gap to the lead group on their own or in small groups. In particular Deceuninck–Quick-Step who only had Sam Bennett up front, tried various times with both Davide Ballerini, Yves Lampaert and Zdeněk Štybar attacking strongly. Several times the gap was reduced to under 30 seconds, but despite all the attacks the lead group was never caught. After the last climb of the day, the Kemmelberg, after now being chased for nearly 150 kilometres, nine riders remained in the lead group with 36 kilometres to the finish: Bennett, Colbrelli, Küng, Matthews, Nizzolo, Trentin, Van Aert, Van Poppel and Van Aert's teammate Van Hooydonck. Some twenty kilometres further, a vomiting Bennett and tired van Poppel were dropped, both flustered from hanging on over the last climbs, leaving the remaining seven to sprint for the victory.

Küng attacked with just 2.5k to go but was easily brought back by Van Hooydonck, who then pulled the group to the finish as a lead out for this team leader van Aert, who outsprinted the others to take his first Flemish classic win. Nizzolo and Trentin completed the podium.

Behind the leading seven and just under a minute down, Dylan van Baarle and Anthony Turgis took places eight and nine after breaking away from what was left of the chasing group, while Gianni Vermeersch won the sprint of that group to take the final spot in the top-10, 1' 25" behind van Aert.

== Result ==
Result
Rank	Rider	Team	Time
1	Wout van Aert (BEL)	Team Jumbo–Visma	5h 45' 11"
2	Giacomo Nizzolo (ITA)	Team Qhubeka Assos	+ 0"
3	Matteo Trentin (ITA)	UAE Team Emirates	+ 0"
4	Sonny Colbrelli (ITA)	Team Bahrain Victorious	+ 0"
5	Michael Matthews (AUS)	Team BikeExchange	+ 0"
6	Stefan Küng (SUI)	Groupama–FDJ	+ 0"
7	Nathan Van Hooydonck (BEL)	Team Jumbo–Visma	+ 3"
8	Dylan van Baarle (NED)	INEOS Grenadiers	+ 52"
9	Anthony Turgis (FRA)	Total Direct Énergie	+ 54"
10	Gianni Vermeersch (BEL)	Alpecin–Fenix	+ 1' 25"
