= 2019 Le Samyn =

2019 UCI Europe Tour

Race details
- Dates: 5 March 2019
- Stages: 1
- Distance: 200 km (124.3 mi)
- Winning time: 4h 38' 20"

Results
	Winner	Florian Sénéchal (FRA)	(Deceuninck–Quick-Step)
	Second	Aimé De Gendt (BEL)	(Wanty–Gobert)
	Third	Niki Terpstra (NED)	(Direct Énergie)

The 2019 Le Samyn was the 50th edition of Le Samyn road cycling one day race. It was part of UCI Europe Tour in category 1.1.

== Teams ==
Twenty-four teams were invited to take part in the race. These included three UCI World Tour teams, twelve UCI Professional Continental teams and nine UCI Continental teams.

UCI WorldTeams

- AG2R La Mondiale
- Deceuninck–Quick-Step
- Lotto–Soudal

UCI Professional Continental teams

- Androni Giocattoli–Sidermec
- Arkéa–Samsic
- Caja Rural–Seguros RGA
- Cofidis
- Corendon–Circus
- Israel Cycling Academy
- Roompot–Charles
- Sport Vlaanderen–Baloise
- Vital Concept–B&B Hotels
- Wallonie Bruxelles
- Wanty–Gobert
- Direct Énergie

UCI Continental teams

- Amore & Vita–Prodir
- Canyon dhb p/b Bloor Homes
- Cibel–Cebon
- Team Differdange–Geba
- IAM–Excelsior
- Leopard Pro Cycling
- Natura4Ever–Roubaix–Lille Métropole
- Tarteletto–Isorex
- Team Wiggins Le Col

== General classification ==
Result
Rank	Rider	Team	Time
1	Florian Sénéchal (FRA)	Deceuninck–Quick-Step	4h 38' 20"
2	Aimé De Gendt (BEL)	Wanty–Gobert	+ 0"
3	Niki Terpstra (NED)	Direct Énergie	+ 0"
4	Lars Boom (NED)	Roompot–Charles	+ 0"
5	Pieter Serry (BEL)	Deceuninck–Quick-Step	+ 1"
6	Stijn Vandenbergh (BEL)	AG2R La Mondiale	+ 1"
7	Tim Declercq (BEL)	Deceuninck–Quick-Step	+ 6"
8	Elmar Reinders (NED)	Roompot–Charles	+ 8"
9	Jesper Asselman (NED)	Roompot–Charles	+ 14"
10	Rémy Mertz (BEL)	Lotto–Soudal	+ 19"
