= 2018 Gran Piemonte =

2019 Gran Piemonte
2019 UCI Europe Tour

Race details
- Dates: 11 October
- Stages: 1
- Distance: 191 km (118.7 mi)
- Winning time: 4h 20' 50"

Results
	Winner	Sonny Colbrelli (ITA)	(Bahrain–Merida)
	Second	Florian Sénéchal (FRA)	(Quick-Step Floors)
	Third	Davide Ballerini (ITA)	(Androni Giocattoli–Sidermec)

The 2018 Gran Piemonte was the 102nd edition of the Gran Piemonte (known as Giro del Piemonte until 2009) single-day cycling race. It was held on 11 October, over a distance of 191 km, starting in Racconigi and ending in Moncalieri.

The race was won by Sonny Colbrelli of Bahrain–Merida.

== Teams ==
Eighteen teams were invited to take part in the race. These included twelve UCI WorldTeams and six UCI Professional Continental teams.

UCI WorldTeams

- Astana
- Bahrain–Merida
- BMC Racing Team
- Bora–Hansgrohe
- Lotto–Soudal
- Movistar Team
- Quick-Step Floors
- Team Dimension Data
- EF Education First–Drapac p/b Cannondale
- Team Katusha–Alpecin
- Team Sky
- UAE Team Emirates

UCI Professional Continental Teams

- Androni Giocattoli–Sidermec
- Bardiani–CSF
- Gazprom–RusVelo
- Israel Cycling Academy
- Nippo–Vini Fantini–Europa Ovini
- Wilier Triestina–Selle Italia

== Results ==
Result
Rank	Rider	Team	Time
1	Sonny Colbrelli (ITA)	Bahrain–Merida	4h 20' 50"
2	Florian Sénéchal (FRA)	Quick-Step Floors	+ 0"
3	Davide Ballerini (ITA)	Androni Giocattoli–Sidermec	+ 0"
4	Jhonatan Restrepo (COL)	Team Katusha–Alpecin	+ 0"
5	Riccardo Minali (ITA)	Astana	+ 0"
6	Manuel Belletti (ITA)	Androni Giocattoli–Sidermec	+ 0"
7	Christoph Pfingsten (GER)	Bora–Hansgrohe	+ 0"
8	Andrea Guardini (ITA)	Bardiani–CSF	+ 0"
9	Barnabás Peák (HUN)	Quick-Step Floors	+ 2"
10	Simone Velasco (ITA)	Wilier Triestina–Selle Italia	+ 2"
