= 2021 Il Lombardia =

Cycling race

2021 UCI World Tour, race 38 of 38
- Official event poster

Race details
- Dates: 9 October 2021
- Stages: 1
- Distance: 243 km (151.0 mi)
- Winning time: 6h 01' 39"

Results
	Winner	Tadej Pogačar (SLO)	(UAE Team Emirates)
	Second	Fausto Masnada (ITA)	(Deceuninck–Quick-Step)
	Third	Adam Yates (GBR)	(Ineos Grenadiers)

The 2021 Il Lombardia was a road cycling one-day race that took place on 9 October 2021 in Italy. It was the 115th edition of Il Lombardia and the 37th event of the 2021 UCI World Tour. It was won by Tadej Pogačar in the sprint against Fausto Masnada. In the chasing group Adam Yates won the sprint for third place.

== Teams ==
Twenty-five teams, consisting of all 19 UCI WorldTour teams and 7 UCI Professional Continental teams, of seven riders participated in the race.

== Result ==
Result
Rank	Rider	Team	Time
1	Tadej Pogačar (SLO)	UAE Team Emirates	6h 01' 39"
2	Fausto Masnada (ITA)	Deceuninck–Quick-Step	+ 0"
3	Adam Yates (GBR)	Ineos Grenadiers	+ 51"
4	Primož Roglič (SLO)	Team Jumbo–Visma	+ 51"
5	Alejandro Valverde (ESP)	Movistar Team	+ 51"
6	Julian Alaphilippe (FRA)	Deceuninck–Quick-Step	+ 51"
7	David Gaudu (FRA)	Groupama–FDJ	+ 51"
8	Romain Bardet (FRA)	Team DSM	+ 51"
9	Michael Woods (CAN)	Israel Start-Up Nation	+ 51"
10	Sergio Higuita (COL)	EF Education–Nippo	+ 2' 25"
11	Nairo Quintana (COL)	Arkéa–Samsic	+ 2' 25"
12	Attila Valter (HUN)	Groupama–FDJ	+ 2' 25"
13	Vincenzo Nibali (ITA)	Trek–Segafredo	+ 2' 25"
14	Jonas Vingegaard (DEN)	Team Jumbo–Visma	+ 2' 25"
15	Lorenzo Fortunato (ITA)	Eolo–Kometa	+ 2' 25"
16	Nelson Oliveira (POR)	Movistar Team	+ 2' 25"
17	Pavel Sivakov (RUS)	Ineos Grenadiers	+ 2' 35"
18	Mikel Nieve (ESP)	Team BikeExchange	+ 2' 49"
19	Remco Evenepoel (BEL)	Deceuninck–Quick-Step	+ 3' 13"
20	Bauke Mollema (NED)	Trek–Segafredo	+ 3' 23"
21	Ben Tulett (GBR)	Alpecin–Fenix	+ 3' 23"
22	Davide Villella (ITA)	Movistar Team	+ 3' 33"
23	Diego Ulissi (ITA)	UAE Team Emirates	+ 3' 33"
24	Rafał Majka (POL)	UAE Team Emirates	+ 3' 33"
25	Michael Storer (AUS)	Team DSM	+ 3' 33"
26	Amanuel Ghebreigzabhier (ERI)	Trek–Segafredo	+ 4' 28"
27	Toms Skujiņš (LAT)	Trek–Segafredo	+ 5' 22"
28	Lorenzo Rota (ITA)	Intermarché–Wanty–Gobert Matériaux	+ 5' 22"
29	Tiesj Benoot (BEL)	Team DSM	+ 5' 22"
30	Domenico Pozzovivo (ITA)	Team Qhubeka NextHash	+ 5' 22"
31	Larry Warbasse (USA)	AG2R Citroën Team	+ 5' 22"
32	Geoffrey Bouchard (FRA)	AG2R Citroën Team	+ 5' 36"
33	Harm Vanhoucke (BEL)	Lotto–Soudal	+ 5' 36"
34	Aurélien Paret-Peintre (FRA)	AG2R Citroën Team	+ 5' 36"
35	Matteo Badilatti (SUI)	Groupama–FDJ	+ 5' 36"
36	Marc Hirschi (SUI)	UAE Team Emirates	+ 5' 36"
37	Dylan Teuns (BEL)	Team Bahrain Victorious	+ 5' 36"
38	Dan Martin (IRL)	Israel Start-Up Nation	+ 5' 36"
39	Aleksandr Vlasov (RUS)	Astana–Premier Tech	+ 5' 56"
40	João Almeida (POR)	Deceuninck–Quick-Step	+ 6' 56"
41	Felix Großschartner (AUT)	Bora–Hansgrohe	+ 7' 05"
42	Simone Petilli (ITA)	Intermarché–Wanty–Gobert Matériaux	+ 8' 18"
43	Steven Kruijswijk (NED)	Team Jumbo–Visma	+ 8' 23"
44	Guillaume Martin (FRA)	Cofidis	+ 8' 23"
45	Dario Cataldo (ITA)	Movistar Team	+ 8' 23"
46	Clément Berthet (FRA)	AG2R Citroën Team	+ 8' 37"
47	Kristian Sbaragli (ITA)	Alpecin–Fenix	+ 8' 37"
48	Andrey Zeits (KAZ)	Team BikeExchange	+ 8' 37"
49	Andrea Garosio (ITA)	Bardiani–CSF–Faizanè	+ 8' 37"
50	Thibaut Pinot (FRA)	Groupama–FDJ	+ 8' 37"
51	Neilson Powless (USA)	EF Education–Nippo	+ 11' 06"
52	José Joaquín Rojas (ESP)	Movistar Team	+ 11' 06"
53	Odd Christian Eiking (NOR)	Intermarché–Wanty–Gobert Matériaux	+ 11' 06"
54	Jan Bakelants (BEL)	Intermarché–Wanty–Gobert Matériaux	+ 11' 06"
55	Patrick Konrad (AUT)	Bora–Hansgrohe	+ 11' 09"
56	Rigoberto Urán (COL)	EF Education–Nippo	+ 11' 09"
57	Tao Geoghegan Hart (GBR)	Ineos Grenadiers	+ 11' 09"
58	Maxime Bouet (FRA)	Arkéa–Samsic	+ 11' 09"
59	Nick Schultz (AUS)	Team BikeExchange	+ 11' 09"
60	Sébastien Reichenbach (SUI)	Groupama–FDJ	+ 11' 09"
61	Mark Christian (GBR)	Eolo–Kometa	+ 11' 09"
62	Clément Champoussin (FRA)	AG2R Citroën Team	+ 11' 09"
63	Jonathan Castroviejo (ESP)	Ineos Grenadiers	+ 11' 09"
64	Chris Hamilton (AUS)	Team DSM	+ 11' 09"
65	Brandon McNulty (USA)	UAE Team Emirates	+ 11' 44"
66	Simone Ravanelli (ITA)	Androni Giocattoli–Sidermec	+ 14' 19"
67	Mattia Bais (ITA)	Androni Giocattoli–Sidermec	+ 14' 36"
68	Matteo Fabbro (ITA)	Bora–Hansgrohe	+ 14' 36"
69	Davide Formolo (ITA)	UAE Team Emirates	+ 14' 36"
70	Andrea Bagioli (ITA)	Deceuninck–Quick-Step	+ 14' 42"
71	Davide Orrico (ITA)	Vini Zabù	+ 15' 33"
72	Edoardo Zardini (ITA)	Vini Zabù	+ 16' 24"
73	Reto Hollenstein (SUI)	Israel Start-Up Nation	+ 17' 13"
74	Louis Vervaeke (BEL)	Alpecin–Fenix	+ 17' 13"
75	Rein Taaramäe (EST)	Intermarché–Wanty–Gobert Matériaux	+ 17' 13"
76	Dayer Quintana (COL)	Arkéa–Samsic	+ 17' 13"
77	Domen Novak (SLO)	Team Bahrain Victorious	+ 17' 13"
78	Steff Cras (BEL)	Lotto–Soudal	+ 17' 13"
79	Luca Covili (ITA)	Bardiani–CSF–Faizanè	+ 19' 02"
80	Sam Oomen (NED)	Team Jumbo–Visma	+ 19' 06"
81	Edward Ravasi (ITA)	Eolo–Kometa	+ 19' 28"
82	Tim Wellens (BEL)	Lotto–Soudal	+ 19' 38"
83	Antonio Tiberi (ITA)	Trek–Segafredo	+ 19' 58"
84	Kevin Colleoni (ITA)	Team BikeExchange	+ 20' 21"
85	George Bennett (NZL)	Team Jumbo–Visma	+ 20' 47"
86	Simon Yates (GBR)	Team BikeExchange	+ 20' 47"
87	Eddie Dunbar (IRL)	Ineos Grenadiers	+ 20' 47"
88	Thymen Arensman (NED)	Team DSM	+ 21' 38"
89	Mark Donovan (GBR)	Team DSM	+ 21' 38"
90	Thomas Champion (FRA)	Cofidis	+ 21' 38"
91	Koen Bouwman (NED)	Team Jumbo–Visma	+ 21' 38"
92	Rubén Fernández (ESP)	Cofidis	+ 21' 38"
93	Simon Geschke (GER)	Cofidis	+ 21' 38"
94	Eduardo Sepúlveda (ARG)	Androni Giocattoli–Sidermec	+ 21' 38"
95	Davide Gabburo (ITA)	Bardiani–CSF–Faizanè	+ 21' 38"
96	Daniel Savini (ITA)	Bardiani–CSF–Faizanè	+ 21' 38"
97	Hermann Pernsteiner (AUT)	Team Bahrain Victorious	+ 21' 38"
98	Ben Swift (GBR)	Ineos Grenadiers	+ 21' 38"
99	Victor Campenaerts (BEL)	Team Qhubeka NextHash	+ 21' 38"
100	Damien Howson (AUS)	Team BikeExchange	+ 27' 59"
101	Santiago Buitrago (COL)	Team Bahrain Victorious	+ 27' 59"
102	Gonzalo Serrano (ESP)	Movistar Team	+ 27' 59"
103	Tomasz Marczyński (POL)	Lotto–Soudal	+ 28' 37"
104	Christopher Juul-Jensen (DEN)	Team BikeExchange	+ 28' 37"
105	Alessandro Monaco (ITA)	Bardiani–CSF–Faizanè	+ 28' 37"
106	Will Barta (USA)	EF Education–Nippo	+ 28' 37"
107	Andreas Leknessund (NOR)	Team DSM	+ 28' 37"
