= Aimé De Gendt =

Belgian bicycle racer

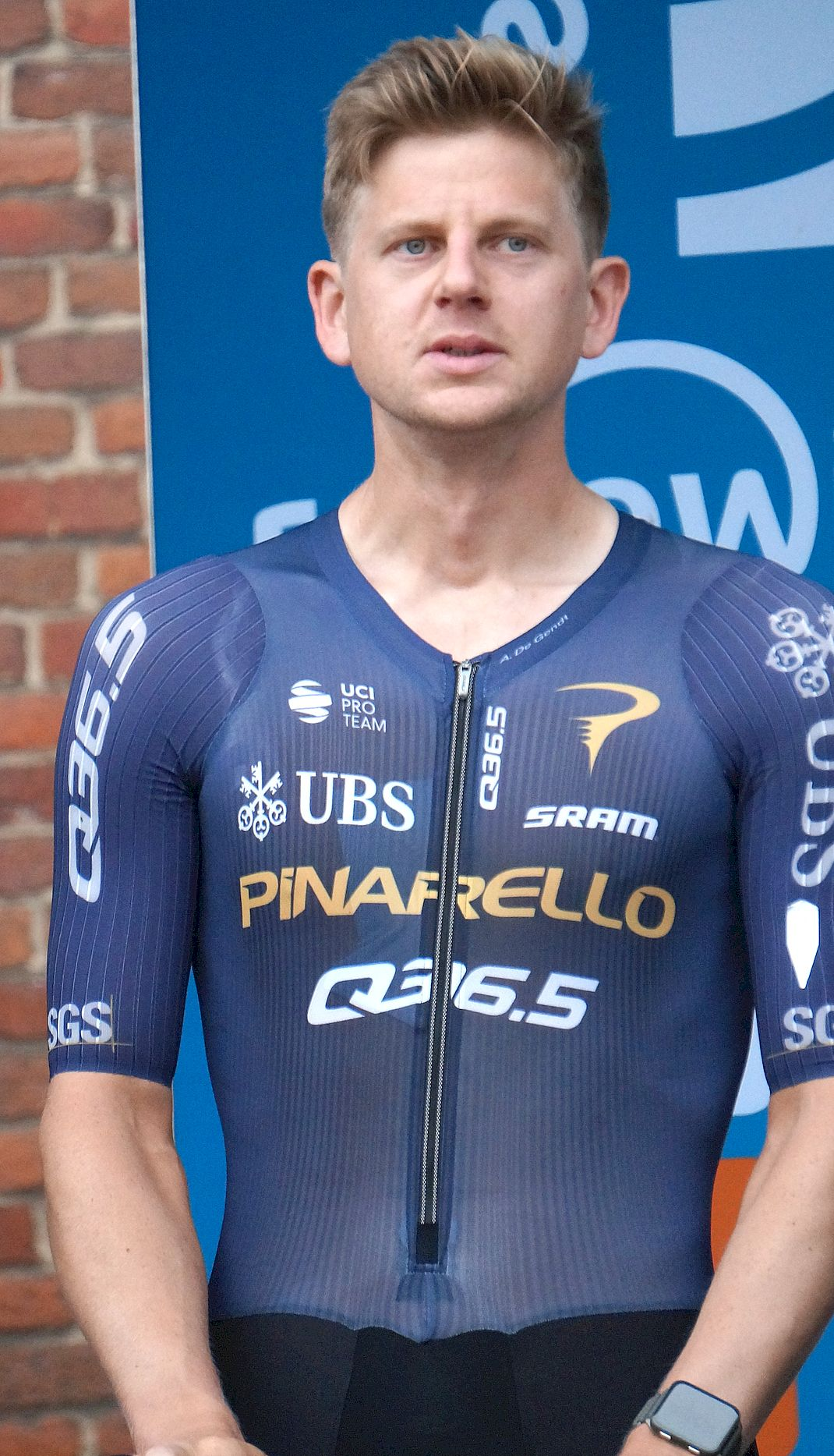
- De Gendt in 2026.

Personal information
- Full name: Aimé De Gendt
- Born: 17 June 1994 (age 32) Aalst, Belgium
- Height: 1.82 m (6 ft 0 in)
- Weight: 75 kg (165 lb)

Cycling career
- Sport: Cycling
- Current team: Intermarché–Wanty
- Discipline: Road
- Role: Rider

Amateur teams
- 2010: Cata Bikes Bianchi
- 2011–2012: Avia
- 2013–2015: EFC–Omega Pharma–Quick-Step

Professional teams
- 2016–2018: Topsport Vlaanderen–Baloise
- 2019–2020: Wanty–Gobert
- 2021–: Intermarché–Wanty–Gobert Matériaux

Aimé De Gendt (born 17 June 1994 in Aalst) is a Belgian cyclist, who currently rides for UCI WorldTeam Intermarché–Wanty. In July 2019, he was named in the startlist for the 2019 Tour de France.

== Major results ==
2012
1st Time trial, National Junior Road Championships
2015
3rd Time trial, National Under-23 Road Championships
3rd Overall Tour de Berlin
2016
1st Mountains classification, Danmark Rundt
2017
1st Combativity classification, Tour of Oman
8th Circuito de Getxo
2018
2nd Grote Prijs Stad Zottegem
4th Primus Classic
8th GP Horsens
2019
1st Antwerp Port Epic
2nd Le Samyn
6th Overall Four Days of Dunkirk
6th Paris–Tours
9th Overall Tour of Belgium
10th Grand Prix de Wallonie
10th Grand Prix La Marseillaise
Combativity award Stage 11 Tour de France
2020
2nd Le Samyn
3rd Overall Tour de Luxembourg
4th Bretagne Classic
8th Overall Étoile de Bessèges
2021
2nd Brussels Cycling Classic
3rd Druivenkoers Overijse
2024
7th Druivenkoers Overijse
8th Grand Prix de Denain
10th Overall Four Days of Dunkirk
2025
7th E3 Saxo Classic
2026
5th Omloop Het Nieuwsblad
8th Gent–Wevelgem
8th Flandrien 0.0 Classic
8th Circuit de Wallonie

=== Grand Tour general classification results timeline ===
| Grand Tour | 2019 | 2020 | 2021 | 2022 |
|---|---|---|---|---|
| Giro d'Italia | — | — | — | 105 |
| Tour de France | 136 | — | — | — |
| Vuelta a España | — | — | — | — |

Legend
| — | Did not compete |
| DNF | Did not finish |
| IP | In progress |
