= Tosh Van der Sande =

Belgian professional cyclist

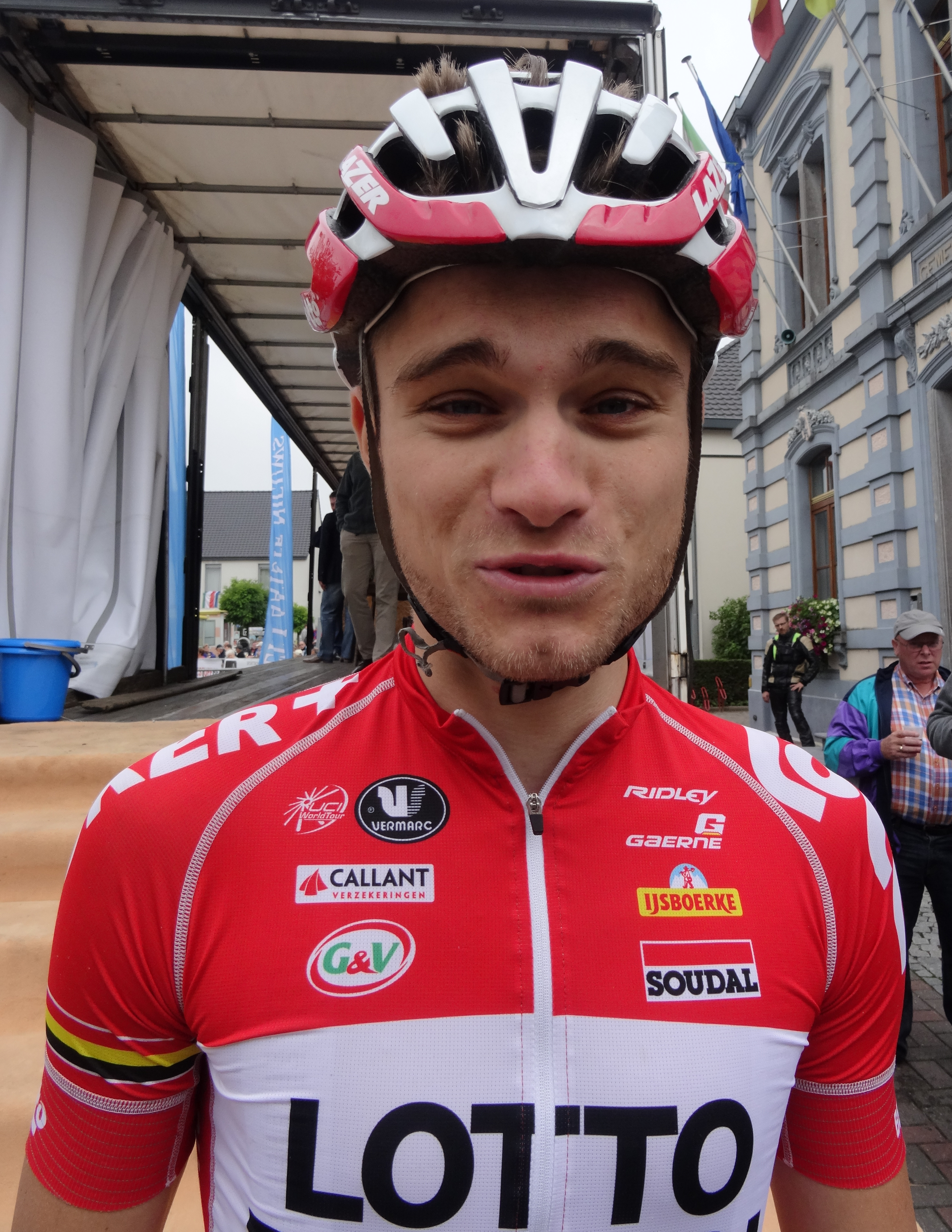
- Van der Sande in 2014

Personal information
- Full name: Tosh Van der Sande
- Born: 28 November 1990 (age 35) Wijnegem, Belgium
- Height: 1.78 m (5 ft 10 in)
- Weight: 64 kg (141 lb)

Cycling career
- Sport: Cycling
- Disciplines: Road; Track (former)
- Role: Rider

Amateur teams
- 2009–2010: Beveren 2000–Quick-Step
- 2011: Omega Pharma–Lotto Davo
- 2011: Omega Pharma–Lotto (stagiaire)

Professional teams
- 2012–2021: Lotto–Soudal
- 2022–2025: Team Jumbo–Visma

Tosh Van der Sande (born 28 November 1990) is a Belgian former professional cyclist, who last rode for UCI WorldTeam Visma–Lease a Bike. Van der Sande, who competed from 2012 to 2025, was considered as a classics specialist.

== Career ==
=== Early career ===
As a junior, he found success in track cycling. In 2011, he won the Liège–Bastogne–Liège U23.

=== Professional career ===
He turned professional with Lotto–Belisol in 2012, and rode his first Grand Tour the following year at the Vuelta a España. He extended his contract in 2013, and has since then remained in the team.

After he accidentally listed the wrong nasal spray brand in the paperwork at the 2018 Six Days of Ghent where he returned a positive test for prednisolone, a substance found in the nasal spray Sofrasolone, he was temporarily suspended by his team. He was later cleared of any wrongdoing by the UCI.

== Major results ==
2006
National Novice Track Championships

1st Points race
1st Scratch
2nd Sprint

National Junior Track Championships

2nd Madison
2nd Team pursuit

2007
National Junior Track Championships

1st Points race
1st Scratch
2nd Madison
2nd Team sprint

3rd Aalst–St. Truiden
3rd UIV Cup, Gent
2008
UCI Junior Track World Championships

1st Points race
2nd Madison

National Junior Track Championships

1st Points race
1st Scratch
1st Madison
1st Team pursuit

UIV Cup

1st Gent
2nd Munich

1st Stage 2 Ronde van Antwerpen
2nd Overall Giro di Toscana Juniors

1st Points classification
1st Stages 1 & 3

2nd Aalst–St. Truiden
4th Overall Trofeo Karlsberg

1st Stage 4

5th Overall Münsterland Tour

1st Points classification
1st Stage 2

10th Road race, UCI Juniors World Championships
2009
1st Stage 4 Tour de la Province de Namur
2010
10th Liège–Bastogne–Liège Espoirs
2011
1st Liège–Bastogne–Liège Espoirs
1st Stage 1 Vuelta a Navarra
3rd Overall Tour de Liège

1st Stage 5

3rd La Côte Picarde
4th Overall Le Triptyque des Monts et Châteaux

1st Stages 1 & 3

6th Flèche Ardennaise
8th Overall Tour de Normandie
9th Road race, UCI Road World Under-23 Championships
2012
1st Mountains classification, Three Days of De Panne
3rd Borsbeek Individueel
4th Kampioenschap van Vlaanderen
7th Gullegem Koerse
2013
9th Grand Prix Impanis-Van Petegem
2014
2nd Grand Prix Impanis-Van Petegem
4th Omloop van het Houtland
2015
2nd Paris–Tours
2016
1st Stage 2 Tour de l'Ain
7th Overall Driedaagse van West-Vlaanderen
10th Nationale Sluitingsprijs
2017
2nd Overall Tour de Wallonie
6th Bruges Cycling Classic
2018
10th Halle–Ingooigem
2019
2nd Overall Tour de Wallonie

1st Stage 5

2021
2nd Primus Classic
3rd Brussels Cycling Classic
3rd Grand Prix de Wallonie
5th Overall Danmark Rundt
5th Dwars door Vlaanderen
10th Amstel Gold Race
2022
9th Overall ZLM Tour

=== Grand Tour general classification results timeline ===
Grand Tour	2013	2014	2015	2016	2017	2018	2019	2020	2021
Giro d'Italia	—	93	—	—	—	DNF	64	—	—
Tour de France	—	—	—	—	—	—	—	—	DNF
Vuelta a España	127	—	49	109	—	114	65	96	—

Legend
—	Did not compete
DNF	Did not finish
