= 2020 Bretagne Classic Ouest-France =

Cycling race

2020 Bretagne Classic Ouest–France
2020 UCI World Tour, race 11 of 21

Race details
- Dates: 25 August 2020
- Stages: 1
- Distance: 247.8 km (154.0 mi)
- Winning time: 6h 01' 15"

Results
	Winner	Michael Matthews (AUS)	(Team Sunweb)
	Second	Luka Mezgec (SLO)	(Mitchelton–Scott)
	Third	Florian Sénéchal (FRA)	(Deceuninck–Quick-Step)

The 2020 Bretagne Classic Ouest–France was a road cycling one-day race that took place on 25 August 2020 in France. It was the 84th edition of Bretagne Classic Ouest–France and the 11th event of the 2020 UCI World Tour.

== Teams ==
Twenty-five teams, including all 19 UCI WorldTour teams and six UCI Professional Continental teams, were scheduled to participate in the race. All but two teams, those EF Pro Cycling and Total Direct Énergie which each entered six riders, entered seven riders. On the morning of the race, an unnamed Bora–Hansgrohe rider tested positive for COVID-19, so the entire team decided to pull out of the race. This meant that 166 riders started the race, of which 104 finished. After the race, Ralph Denk the team boss of Bora–Hansgrohe, raised concerns about the COVID-19 test, after it returned a false positive.

UCI WorldTeams

- AG2R La Mondiale
- Astana
- Bahrain–McLaren
- Bora–Hansgrohe
- CCC Team
- Deceuninck–Quick-Step
- EF Pro Cycling
- Groupama–FDJ
- Israel Start-Up Nation
- Lotto–Soudal
- Mitchelton–Scott
- Movistar Team
- NTT Pro Cycling
- Team Ineos
- Team Jumbo–Visma
- Team Sunweb
- Trek–Segafredo
- UAE Team Emirates

UCI Professional Continental teams

- Alpecin–Fenix
- Arkéa–Samsic
- B&B Hotels–Vital Concept
- Circus–Wanty Gobert
- Nippo–Delko–One Provence
- Total Direct Énergie

== Results ==
Result
Rank	Rider	Team	Time
1	Michael Matthews (AUS)	Team Sunweb	6h 01' 15"
2	Luka Mezgec (SLO)	Mitchelton–Scott	+ 1"
3	Florian Sénéchal (FRA)	Deceuninck–Quick-Step	+ 1"
4	Aimé De Gendt (BEL)	Circus–Wanty Gobert	+ 1"
5	Alessandro Fedeli (ITA)	Nippo–Delko–One Provence	+ 1"
6	Quinn Simmons (USA)	Trek–Segafredo	+ 1"
7	Nils Eekhoff (NED)	Team Sunweb	+ 3"
8	Daniel McLay (GBR)	Arkéa–Samsic	+ 5"
9	Anthony Roux (FRA)	Groupama–FDJ	+ 5"
10	Iván García (ESP)	Bahrain–McLaren	+ 5"
