= 2021 Omloop Het Nieuwsblad =

2021 UCI World Tour, race 2 of 29
- Event poster with previous winners Annemiek van Vleuten and Jasper Stuyven

Race details
- Dates: 27 February 2021
- Stages: 1
- Distance: 201 km (125 mi)
- Winning time: 4h 43' 03"

Results
| | Winner | Davide Ballerini (ITA) | (Deceuninck–Quick-Step) |
| | Second | Jake Stewart (GBR) | (Groupama–FDJ) |
| | Third | Sep Vanmarcke (BEL) | (Israel Start-Up Nation) |

The 2021 Omloop Het Nieuwsblad was a road cycling one-day race that took place on 27 February 2021 in Belgium, starting in Gent and finishing in Ninove. It was the 76th edition of the Omloop Het Nieuwsblad and the second event of the 2021 UCI World Tour.

The Omloop Het Nieuwsblad is a race that is usually won by a solo rider or is decided by a sprint from a small group of several riders. However, this year, the good weather and the race conditions contributed to a comparatively large group of over 50 riders that contested the final sprint. Deceuninck–Quick-Step led from the front as their lead-out train, including current World Road Race champion Julian Alaphilippe, tried to set up in-form sprinter Davide Ballerini for the win. In the ensuing sprint, Ballerini won easily, having not been troubled by any of the other sprinters. Behind him, neo-pro Jake Stewart slipped past 2012 winner Sep Vanmarcke along the barriers to take second. For his part, Vanmarcke held off Heinrich Haussler with the bike throw on the line to secure third, that being the former's third third-place result in the race after back-to-back third places in 2017 and 2018.

== Teams ==
Twenty-five teams participated in the race, including all nineteen UCI WorldTour teams and six UCI ProTeams. Each team entered seven riders for a total of 175 riders, of which 140 finished.

UCI WorldTeams

- AG2R Citroën Team
- Astana–Premier Tech
- Bora–Hansgrohe
- Cofidis
- Deceuninck–Quick-Step
- EF Education–Nippo
- Groupama–FDJ
- Ineos Grenadiers
- Intermarché–Wanty–Gobert Matériaux
- Israel Start-Up Nation
- Lotto–Soudal
- Movistar Team
- Team Bahrain Victorious
- Team BikeExchange
- Team DSM
- Team Jumbo–Visma
- Team Qhubeka Assos
- Trek–Segafredo
- UAE Team Emirates

UCI ProTeams

- Alpecin–Fenix
- Arkéa–Samsic
- B&B Hotels p/b KTM
- Bingoal WB
- Sport Vlaanderen–Baloise
- Total Direct Énergie

== Result ==
Result
| Rank | Rider | Team | Time |
|---|---|---|---|
| 1 | Davide Ballerini (ITA) | Deceuninck–Quick-Step | 4h 43' 03" |
| 2 | Jake Stewart (GBR) | Groupama–FDJ | + 0" |
| 3 | Sep Vanmarcke (BEL) | Israel Start-Up Nation | + 0" |
| 4 | Heinrich Haussler (AUS) | Team Bahrain Victorious | + 0" |
| 5 | Philippe Gilbert (BEL) | Lotto–Soudal | + 0" |
| 6 | Alex Aranburu (ESP) | Astana–Premier Tech | + 0" |
| 7 | Florian Sénéchal (FRA) | Deceuninck–Quick-Step | + 0" |
| 8 | Matteo Trentin (ITA) | UAE Team Emirates | + 0" |
| 9 | Kevin Geniets (LUX) | Groupama–FDJ | + 0" |
| 10 | Nils Politt (GER) | Bora–Hansgrohe | + 0" |
