= Florian Sénéchal =

French cyclist (born 1993)

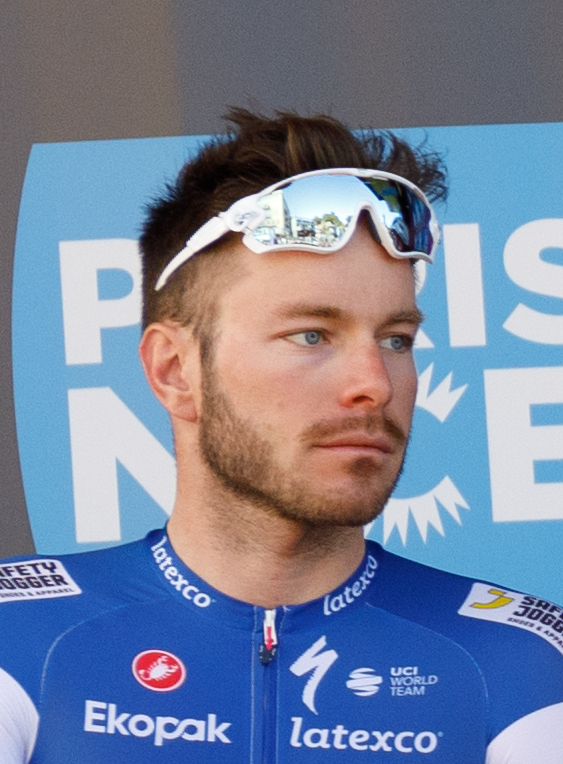
- Sénéchal at the 2023 Paris–Nice

Personal information
- Full name: Florian Sénéchal
- Born: 10 July 1993 (age 33) Cambrai, France
- Height: 1.79 m (5 ft 10 in)
- Weight: 76 kg (168 lb)

Cycling career
- Sport: Cycling
- Current team: Alpecin–Premier Tech
- Discipline: Road
- Role: Rider
- Rider type: Classics specialist

Amateur teams
- 2010–2011: Wasquehal Junior
- 2012: EFC–Omega Pharma–Quick-Step

Professional teams
- 2012: Omega Pharma–Quick-Step (stagiaire)
- 2013: Etixx–IHNed
- 2014–2017: Cofidis
- 2018–2023: Quick-Step Floors
- 2024–2025: Arkéa–B&B Hotels
- 2026–: Alpecin–Premier Tech

Major wins
- Grand Tours Vuelta a España 1 individual stage (2021) One-day races and Classics National Road Race Championships (2022) Primus Classic (2021)

Florian Sénéchal (born 10 July 1993) is a French racing cyclist, who rides for UCI WorldTeam Alpecin–Premier Tech. A classics specialist, Sénéchal has taken five victories during his professional career, including a stage win at the 2021 Vuelta a España and winning the French National Road Race Championships in 2022.

== Career ==
Born in Cambrai, Sénéchal rode for Wasquehal Junior in 2010 and 2011, winning Paris–Roubaix Juniors in 2011, before joining EFC–Omega Pharma–Quick-Step – the under-23 team of Omega Pharma–Quick-Step – in 2012. Having rode as a stagiaire for Omega Pharma–Quick-Step, Sénéchal joined the team's development squad, Etixx–IHNed, for 2013, where he won the Memoriał Henryka Łasaka one-day race, before a stage win and successes in the general and points classifications at the Okolo Jižních Čech. He also rode as part of the Etixx–IHNed squad that contested the team time trial at the UCI Road World Championships in Italy.

=== Cofidis (2014–2017) ===
Sénéchal joined the Cofidis team for the 2014 season, and in his first race with the team, he finished eighth overall at La Tropicale Amissa Bongo in Africa, winning the white jersey as the best young rider. His only other top-ten overall finish came at the Four Days of Dunkirk, where he finished sixth overall. The following year, Sénéchal made his first start at a Grand Tour, when he rode the Tour de France. His best result of the season was a third-place finish at Tro-Bro Léon, where he finished as part of the lead group, despite suffering a crash around halfway through the race.

In 2016, Sénéchal recorded two top-five finishes in the first quarter of the season, with third at Le Samyn and fifth at the Classic Loire Atlantique. He placed eighth overall at the Tour de Wallonie – winning the young rider classification – and third at Dwars door het Hageland, before making his first start at the Vuelta a España. Sénéchal was unable to repeat his podium finish at Le Samyn in 2017, finishing in fourth place, having been beaten to the finish by Iljo Keisse, while his only other top-five placing during the year came at the French National Road Race Championships, where he finished in fifth place.

=== Quick-Step Floors (2018–2023) ===
In August 2017, Sénéchal signed an initial two-year contract to join Quick-Step Floors from the 2018 season, his first UCI WorldTeam contract.

==== 2018–2019 ====
He took top-five finishes at the Clásica de Almería (fifth) and Dwars door West-Vlaanderen (second), finishing the latter behind teammate Rémi Cavagna. He made his first start at the Giro d'Italia in May, and following this, he took three further top-five finishes over the remainder of the season – fourth at the Brussels Cycling Classic, third at the Grand Prix d'Isbergues, and second to Sonny Colbrelli in the Gran Piemonte. The following year, Sénéchal took his first professional race victory at Le Samyn in March. He was one of three Deceuninck–Quick-Step riders that were in a lead group of ten riders on the final circuit lap around Dour, and with pressure being applied at the front by Tim Declercq and Pieter Serry, Sénéchal was able to out-sprint his rivals to the finish line. He finished sixth at Paris–Roubaix, leading home a small group around three-quarters of a minute behind the race winner, teammate Philippe Gilbert. In July, Sénéchal signed a two-year contract extension with the team, taking him to the end of the 2021 season. Sénéchal took two further runner-up finishes over the remainder of the season – he finished second on the second stage of July's Adriatica Ionica Race, as part of a 1–2–3 finish for Deceuninck–Quick-Step along with Álvaro Hodeg and Gilbert, and second to Piet Allegaert at the Tour de l'Eurométropole in October. He was also involved in a post-race incident with Max Walscheid at the Münsterland Giro, later apologising for his actions.

==== 2020 ====
Prior to the COVID-19 pandemic-enforced suspension of racing in 2020, Sénéchal recorded top-ten finishes in the early-season Belgian races Omloop Het Nieuwsblad (tenth), Le Samyn (fifth), and the Grote Prijs Jean-Pierre Monseré (seventh). Sénéchal then won the Grote Prijs Vermarc Sport kermesse in July, which was the first race held for professionals after the suspension of racing. Fourth-place finishes followed in successive starts, at Dwars door het Hageland and the Tour de Wallonie, before a UCI World Tour podium finish on home soil, with third in a small group sprint at the Bretagne Classic Ouest-France. Sénéchal took his second career victory four days later at the Druivenkoers Overijse, after a late solo attack. His best result following that victory was a second-place finish to Mads Pedersen at Gent–Wevelgem, having gone clear in a group of four prior to the final kilometre of the race.

==== 2021 ====
In his first start of 2021, Sénéchal finished second to Giacomo Nizzolo in a bunch sprint at the Clásica de Almería, having not been earmarked as Deceuninck–Quick-Step's main sprinter for the race. Having finished seventh at Omloop Het Nieuwsblad, Sénéchal recorded a third-place finish at the Bredene Koksijde Classic, having initially been part of a thirteen-rider move that was brought back. The following week, he led home a small group for second place at the E3 Saxo Bank Classic behind teammate Kasper Asgreen, who had attacked with 5 kilometres (3.1 miles) remaining. He finished off the spring classics with a pair of ninth-place finishes at Dwars door Vlaanderen and the Tour of Flanders. For the first time since 2016, Sénéchal rode the Vuelta a España, primarily as a lead-out man for Fabio Jakobsen. On stage 13, after Jakobsen was dropped in the final kilometres, Sénéchal held off Matteo Trentin in the final sprint to win his first Grand Tour stage. He then won the Primus Classic ahead of the UCI Road World Championships, where he finished in ninth place in the road race, which was won by his teammate Julian Alaphilippe. He also extended his contract with Deceuninck–Quick-Step for a further two years, extending until the end of the 2023 season.

==== 2022–2023 ====
In 2022, Sénéchal took his third successive top-ten finish at February's Omloop Het Nieuwsblad, finishing in ninth place as part of the lead chase group behind solo winner Wout van Aert. He then finished in third place at Dwars door het Hageland in June, before taking his only victory of the season later the same month – when he won the French National Road Race Championships in Cholet, winning the sprint from a group of five riders. He made his début in the jersey at the Tour de France, riding the race for the first time since 2017, being called up late to replace Tim Declercq. His best stage result came on stage nineteen, when he finished in fourth place. Sénéchal recorded no further victories during the season, with runner-up stage finishes at the Deutschland Tour and the Tour de Luxembourg. He then endured a winless 2023, with his best results coming in his final three starts for Soudal–Quick-Step with fifth at the Circuit Franco-Belge, third at the Famenne Ardenne Classic, and seventh at Binche–Chimay–Binche.

=== Arkéa–B&B Hotels (2024-2025) ===
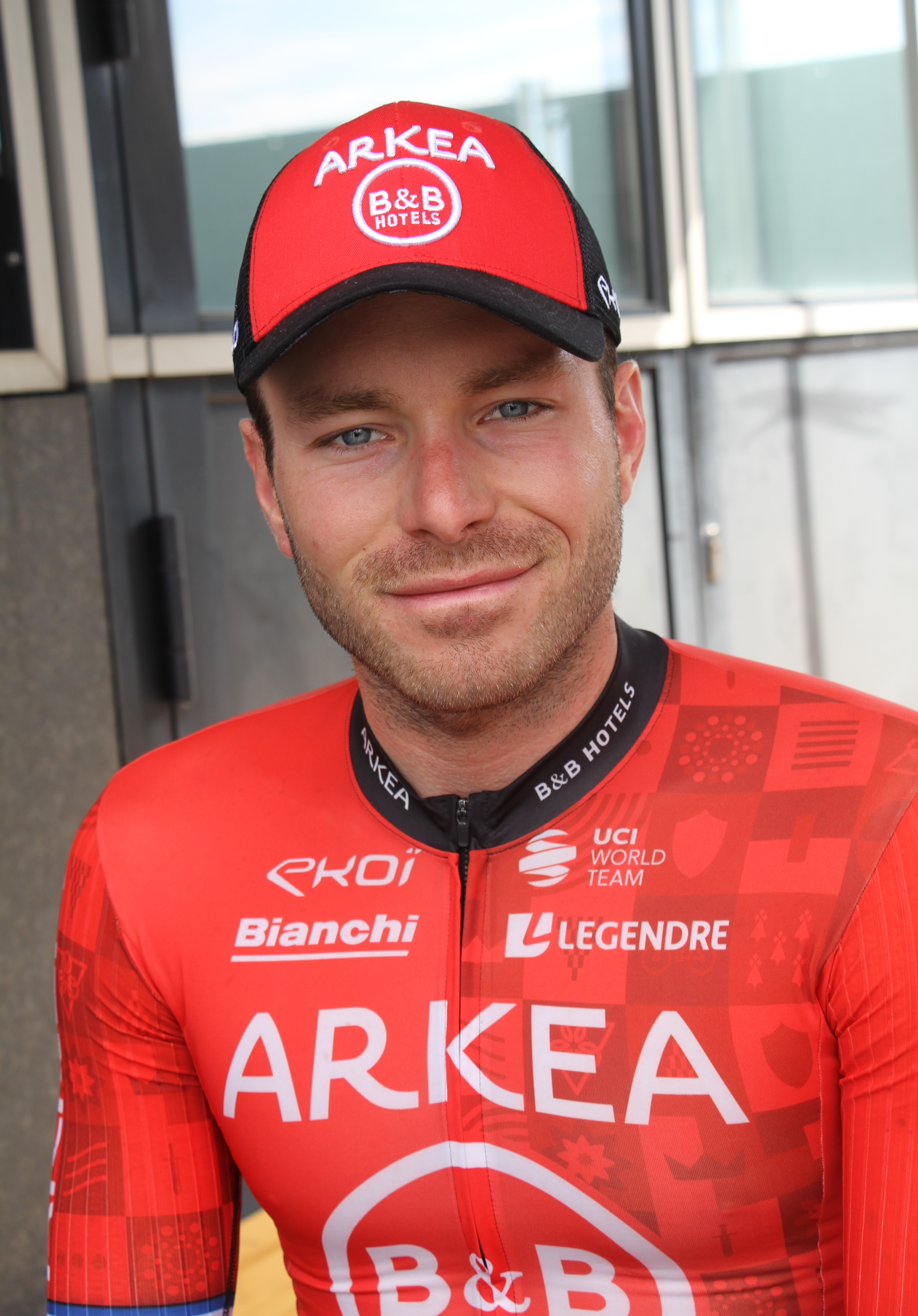
Sénéchal at the 2024 Rund um Köln

In October 2023, Sénéchal signed a two-year contract with UCI WorldTeam Arkéa–B&B Hotels from the 2024 season. His best result during the season was a tenth-place finish at the Antwerp Port Epic, having been set back by two collarbone fractures, the death of his grandfather and burnout which had left him contemplating his career in the sport. He also had to apologise for comments that he had made about the team's equipment provider Bianchi at Paris–Roubaix.

=== Alpecin-Premier Tech (2026) ===
Sénéchal signed a one-year contract with UCI WorldTeam Alpecin–Premier Tech for the 2026 season after the collapse of Arkéa–B&B Hotels.

=== Unibet Rose Rockets ===
For 2027, Sénéchal signed with UCI ProTeam Unibet Rose Rockets.

== Major results ==
2011
1st Paris–Roubaix Juniors
3rd Overall Trophée Centre Morbihan
4th Road race, UCI Junior Road World Championships
6th Overall Trofeo Karlsberg
2012
9th Paris–Roubaix Espoirs
10th Overall Tour de Bretagne
2013
1st Overall Okolo Jižních Čech

1st Points classification
1st Stage 2

1st Memoriał Henryka Łasaka
2nd De Kustpijl
4th Paris–Tours Espoirs
6th Tour du Finistère
8th Overall Paris–Arras Tour
9th Overall Boucle de l'Artois
2014
6th Overall Four Days of Dunkirk
8th Overall La Tropicale Amissa Bongo

1st Young rider classification

2015
3rd Tro-Bro Léon
6th Boucles de l'Aulne
2016
3rd Dwars door het Hageland
3rd Le Samyn
5th Classic Loire Atlantique
5th Tour de l'Eurométropole
8th Overall Tour de Wallonie

1st Young rider classification

10th Overall Driedaagse van West-Vlaanderen
2017
4th Le Samyn
5th Road race, National Road Championships
6th Dwars door het Hageland
7th Overall Four Days of Dunkirk
10th Dwars door Vlaanderen
2018
2nd Gran Piemonte
2nd Dwars door West-Vlaanderen
3rd Grand Prix d'Isbergues
4th Brussels Cycling Classic
5th Clásica de Almería
6th Münsterland Giro
2019
1st Le Samyn
2nd Tour de l'Eurométropole
6th Paris–Roubaix
6th Kuurne–Brussels–Kuurne
7th Binche–Chimay–Binche
9th Bretagne Classic
2020
1st Druivenkoers Overijse
2nd Gent–Wevelgem
3rd Bretagne Classic
4th Overall Tour de Wallonie
4th Dwars door het Hageland
5th Le Samyn
7th Overall BinckBank Tour
7th Grote Prijs Jean-Pierre Monseré
10th Omloop Het Nieuwsblad
2021
1st Primus Classic
1st Stage 13 Vuelta a España
2nd E3 Saxo Bank Classic
2nd Clásica de Almería
3rd Bredene Koksijde Classic
7th Omloop Het Nieuwsblad
9th Road race, UCI Road World Championships
9th Tour of Flanders
9th Dwars door Vlaanderen
2022
1st Road race, National Road Championships
3rd Dwars door het Hageland
9th Omloop Het Nieuwsblad
2023
3rd Famenne Ardenne Classic
5th Circuit Franco-Belge
7th Binche–Chimay–Binche
9th Super 8 Classic
10th Road race, UEC European Road Championships
2024
10th Antwerp Port Epic
2026
8th Le Samyn
9th Paris–Tours

=== Grand Tour general classification results timeline ===
Grand Tour	2015	2016	2017	2018	2019	2020	2021	2022
Giro d'Italia	—	—	—	135	DNF	—	—	—
Tour de France	135	—	161	—	—	—	—	107
Vuelta a España	—	DNF	—	—	—	—	118	—

=== Classics results timeline ===
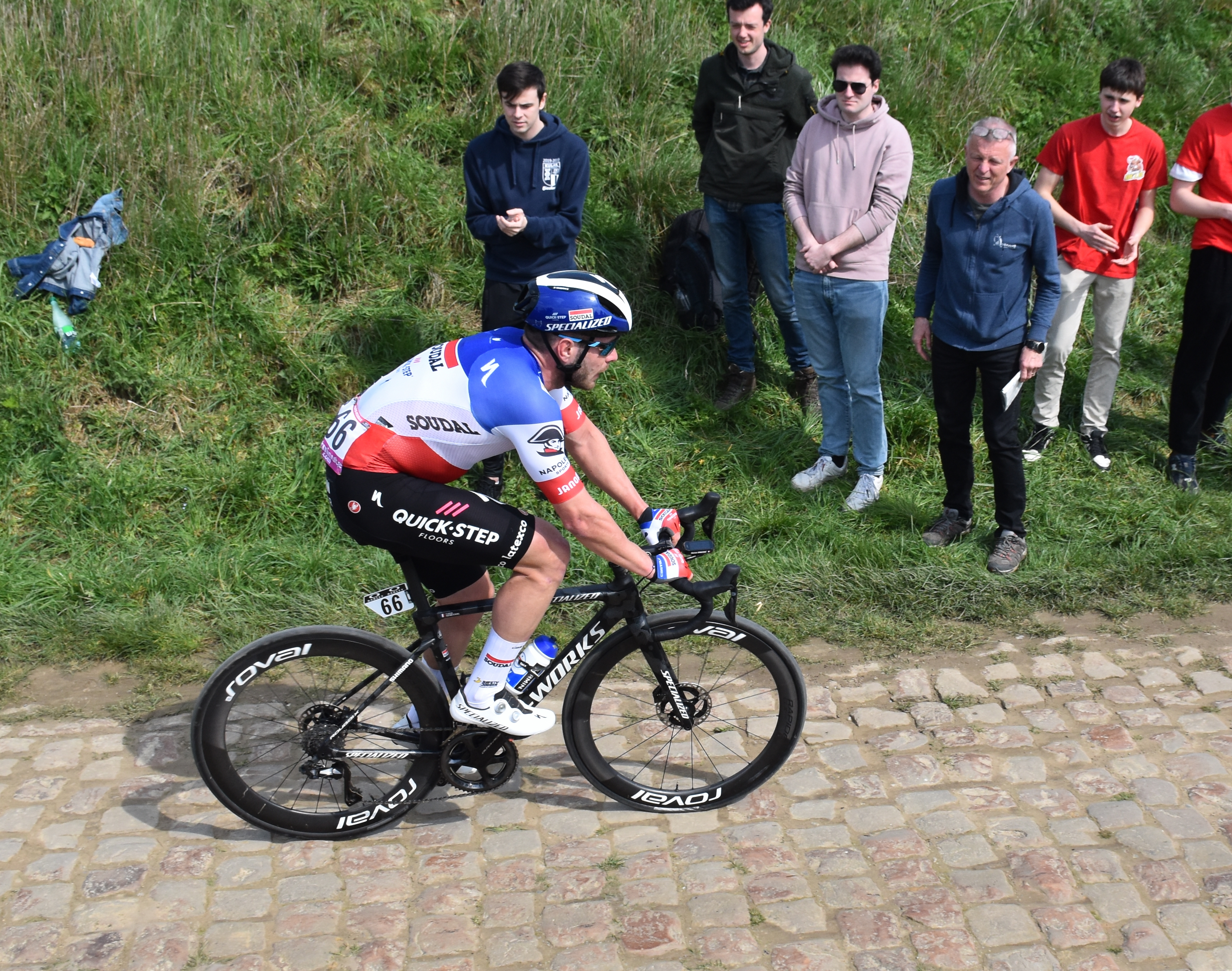
Sénéchal at the 2023 Paris–Roubaix

Monument	2014	2015	2016	2017	2018	2019	2020	2021	2022	2023	2024	2025	2026
Milan–San Remo	—	75	—	173	—	—	—	—	14	76	—	—	—
Tour of Flanders	DNF	90	—	40	44	—	12	9	38	DNF	62	—	—
Paris–Roubaix	49	17	26	12	DNF	6	NH	71	13	63	60	—	DNF
Liège–Bastogne–Liège	Has not contested during his career												
Giro di Lombardia	—	—	—	—	DNF	—	—	—	—	—	—	—	—
Classic	2014	2015	2016	2017	2018	2019	2020	2021	2022	2023	2024	2025	2026
Omloop Het Nieuwsblad	19	24	17	36	—	DNF	10	7	9	77	DNF	110	98
Kuurne–Brussels–Kuurne	74	DNF	31	DNF	—	6	—	—	74	40	—	48	—
Dwars door Vlaanderen	17	DNF	25	10	—	30	NH	9	—	—	129	—	DNF
E3 Harelbeke	14	—	—	—	16	25	NH	2	57	DNF	—	—	—
Gent–Wevelgem	142	19	DNF	100	47	—	2	—	DNF	27	—	—	33
Bretagne Classic	49	43	—	DNF	—	9	3	—	—	DNF	—	—	—
Paris–Tours	19	—	158	—	82	—	—	—	—	—	92	28	9

Legend
—	Did not compete
DNF	Did not finish
IP	In progress
NH	Not held
