= 2021 Brussels Cycling Classic =

2021 UCI Europe Tour 2021 UCI ProSeries
- Event poster with previous winner Tim Merlier

Race details
- Dates: 28 August 2021
- Stages: 1
- Distance: 205.3 km (127.6 mi)
- Winning time: 4h 28' 30"

Results
	Winner	Remco Evenepoel (BEL)	(Deceuninck–Quick-Step)
	Second	Aimé De Gendt (BEL)	(Intermarché–Wanty–Gobert Matériaux)
	Third	Tosh Van der Sande (BEL)	(Lotto–Soudal)

The 2021 Brussels Cycling Classic was the 101st edition of the Brussels Cycling Classic road cycling one day race, which was held on 28 August 2021 as part of the 2021 UCI Europe Tour and the 2021 UCI ProSeries calendars.

The 2021 edition featured a more hilly and undulating course than those of the past few editions, with two ascents of the Muur van Geraardsbergen among the several cobbled climbs along the 205.3-kilometre (127.6 mi) route. Remco Evenepoel (Deceuninck–Quick-Step) took advantage of several breakaway companions going the wrong way with 18 kilometres (11 mi) to go before attacking and dropping Aimé De Gendt (Intermarché–Wanty–Gobert Matériaux) about 8 kilometres (5.0 mi) later. Evenepoel rode across the finish line solo to take his second one-day race victory in three days, having won Druivenkoers Overijse two days prior. De Gendt held on for second while Tosh Van der Sande (Lotto–Soudal) won the bunch sprint to compete the podium.

== Teams ==
Six of the 19 UCI WorldTeams, nine UCI ProTeams, and five UCI Continental teams made up the twenty teams that participated in the race. Cofidis and Team TotalEnergies, with six riders each, were the only teams that did not enter a full squad of seven riders. Of the 138 riders who started the race, 88 finished.

UCI WorldTeams

- Cofidis
- Deceuninck–Quick-Step
- Intermarché–Wanty–Gobert Matériaux
- Lotto–Soudal
- Team Qhubeka NextHash
- UAE Team Emirates

UCI ProTeams

- Alpecin–Fenix
- Arkéa–Samsic
- B&B Hotels p/b KTM
- Bingoal Pauwels Sauces WB
- Sport Vlaanderen–Baloise
- Team Novo Nordisk
- Team TotalEnergies
- Uno-X Pro Cycling Team
- Vini Zabù

UCI Continental Teams

- BEAT Cycling
- Canyon dhb SunGod
- Hagens Berman Axeon
- Tarteletto–Isorex
- Trinity Racing

== Result ==
Result
Rank	Rider	Team	Time
1	Remco Evenepoel (BEL)	Deceuninck–Quick-Step	4h 28' 30"
2	Aimé De Gendt (BEL)	Intermarché–Wanty–Gobert Matériaux	+ 50"
3	Tosh Van der Sande (BEL)	Lotto–Soudal	+ 2' 13"
4	Philippe Gilbert (BEL)	Lotto–Soudal	+ 2' 13"
5	Marc Hirschi (SUI)	UAE Team Emirates	+ 2' 13"
6	Brandon McNulty (USA)	UAE Team Emirates	+ 2' 13"
7	Tim Merlier (BEL)	Alpecin–Fenix	+ 2' 16"
8	Danny van Poppel (NED)	Intermarché–Wanty–Gobert Matériaux	+ 2' 16"
9	Jérémy Lecroq (FRA)	B&B Hotels p/b KTM	+ 2' 16"
10	Fernando Gaviria (COL)	UAE Team Emirates	+ 2' 16"
