= 2021 E3 Saxo Bank Classic =

Cycling race

2021 UCI World Tour, race 9 of 29

Race details
- Dates: 26 March 2021
- Stages: 1
- Distance: 203.9 km (126.7 mi)
- Winning time: 4h 42' 37"

Results
	Winner	Kasper Asgreen (DEN)	(Deceuninck–Quick-Step)
	Second	Florian Sénéchal (FRA)	(Deceuninck–Quick-Step)
	Third	Mathieu van der Poel (NED)	(Alpecin–Fenix)

The 2021 E3 Saxo Bank Classic was a road cycling one-day race that took place on 26 March 2021 in Belgium. It was the 63rd edition of the E3 Saxo Bank Classic, and the 9th event of the 2021 UCI World Tour.

== Teams ==
Twenty-five teams were invited to the race, including all nineteen UCI WorldTeams and six UCI ProTeams. Bora–Hansgrohe were not allowed to start due to rider Matthew Walls testing positive for COVID-19.

UCI WorldTeams

- AG2R Citroën Team
- Astana–Premier Tech
- ~~Bora–Hansgrohe~~
- Cofidis
- Deceuninck–Quick-Step
- EF Education–Nippo
- Groupama–FDJ
- INEOS Grenadiers
- Intermarché–Wanty–Gobert Matériaux
- Israel Start-Up Nation
- Lotto–Soudal
- Movistar Team
- Team Bahrain Victorious
- Team BikeExchange
- Team DSM
- Team Jumbo–Visma
- Team Qhubeka Assos
- Trek–Segafredo
- UAE Team Emirates

UCI ProTeams

- Alpecin–Fenix
- Bingoal Pauwels Sauces WB
- Sport Vlaanderen–Baloise
- Total Direct Énergie
- Uno-X Pro Cycling Team
- Vini Zabù

== Result ==
Result
Rank	Rider	Team	Time
1	Kasper Asgreen (DEN)	Deceuninck–Quick-Step	4h 42' 37"
2	Florian Sénéchal (FRA)	Deceuninck–Quick-Step	+ 32"
3	Mathieu van der Poel (NED)	Alpecin–Fenix	+ 32"
4	Oliver Naesen (BEL)	AG2R Citroën Team	+ 32"
5	Zdeněk Štybar (CZE)	Deceuninck–Quick-Step	+ 32"
6	Greg Van Avermaet (BEL)	AG2R Citroën Team	+ 32"
7	Dylan van Baarle (NED)	INEOS Grenadiers	+ 32"
8	Markus Hoelgaard (NOR)	Uno-X Pro Cycling Team	+ 1' 28"
9	Gianni Vermeersch (BEL)	Alpecin–Fenix	+ 1' 30"
10	Marco Haller (AUT)	Team Bahrain Victorious	+ 1' 30"
