= Pieter Serry =

Belgian road cyclist

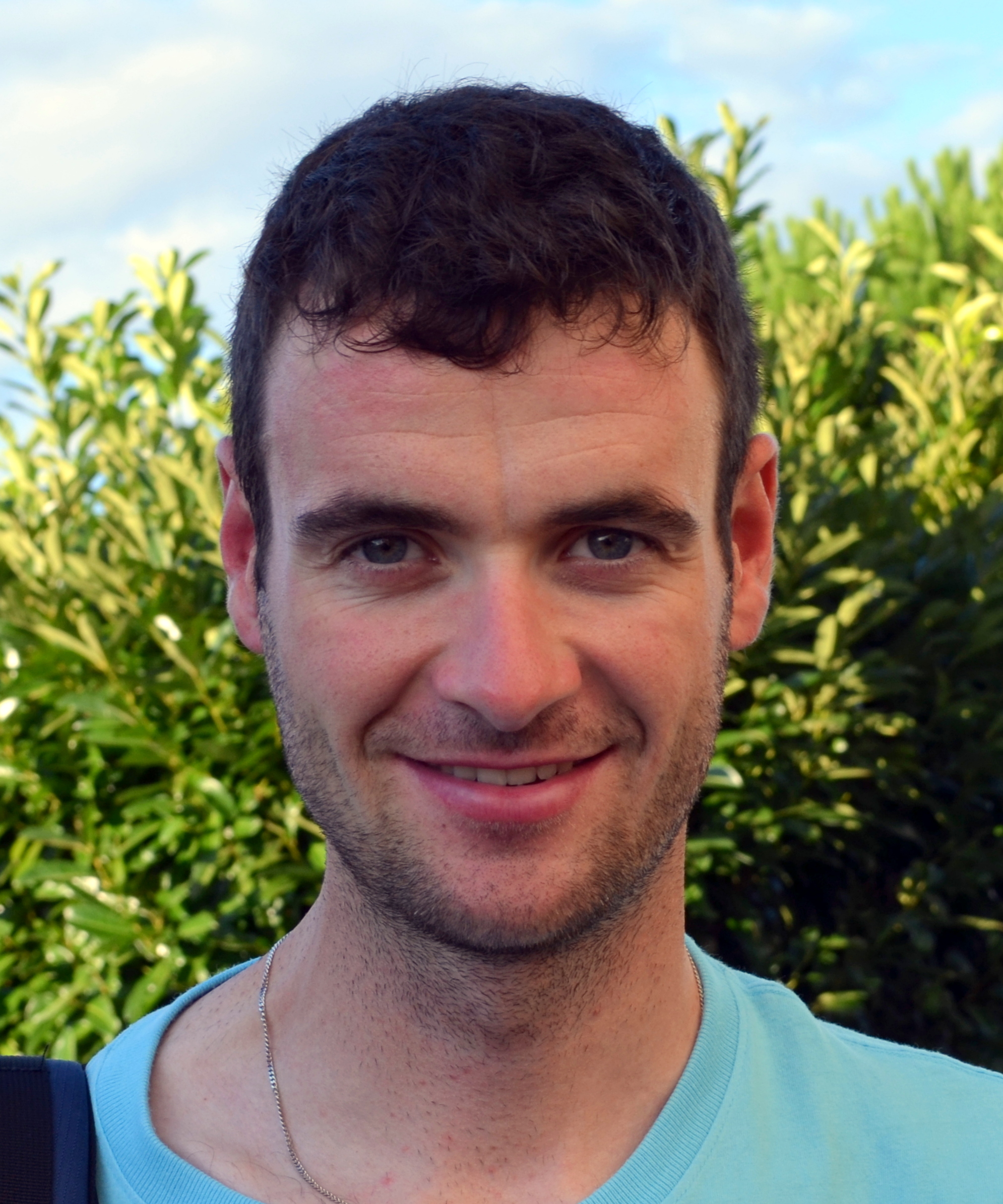
- Serry at the 2014 Tour de l'Ain.

Personal information
- Full name: Pieter Serry
- Nickname: Serrytje
- Born: 21 November 1988 (age 37) Aalter, Belgium
- Height: 1.86 m (6 ft 1 in)
- Weight: 66 kg (146 lb)

Cycling career
- Sport: Cycling
- Current team: Soudal–Quick-Step
- Discipline: Road
- Role: Rider
- Rider type: Puncheur

Amateur team
- 2010: Jong Vlaanderen–Bauknecht

Professional teams
- 2011–2012: Topsport Vlaanderen–Mercator
- 2013–2025: Omega Pharma–Quick-Step

Pieter Serry (born 21 November 1988) is a retired professional Belgian road cyclist.

== Major results ==
2010
4th Overall Cinturó de l'Empordà
5th Overall Tour des Pyrénées
2011
2nd De Vlaamse Pijl
9th Overall Bayern–Rundfahrt

1st Mountains classification

9th Kattekoers
2012
1st Young rider classification, Tour of Belgium
3rd Brabantse Pijl
4th Volta Limburg Classic
6th Overall Tour of Norway
7th Grand Prix de la Somme
9th Grand Prix d'Ouverture La Marseillaise
2013
7th Giro di Lombardia
8th Clásica de San Sebastián
2014
3rd Team time trial, UCI Road World Championships
3rd Time trial, National Road Championships
6th Trofeo Serra de Tramuntana
10th Classic Sud-Ardèche
2015
4th Overall Czech Cycling Tour

1st Stage 1 (TTT)

7th Classic Sud-Ardèche
2016
4th Overall Tour La Provence
4th Classic Sud-Ardèche
5th La Drôme Classic
2017
9th Bruges Cycling Classic
10th Overall Vuelta a San Juan
2018
3rd Overall Tour de Wallonie
4th Road race, National Road Championships
4th Brabantse Pijl
5th Vuelta a Murcia
9th La Drôme Classic
9th Strade Bianche
2019
5th Le Samyn
9th Brabantse Pijl
2020
1st Stage 1b (TTT) Settimana Internazionale di Coppi e Bartali
3rd Road race, National Road Championships
2023
1st Stage 2 (TTT) UAE Tour

=== Grand Tour general classification results timeline ===
Grand Tour	2013	2014	2015	2016	2017	2018	2019	2020	2021	2022	2023	2024
Giro d'Italia	—	74	DNF	70	105	—	38	28	56	148	60	78
Tour de France	Has not contested during his career											
Vuelta a España	50	DNF	62	112	—	88	—	—	—	—	96	

Legend
—	Did not compete
DNF	Did not finish
