= 2021 Tour of Flanders (men's race) =

Cycling race

2021 UCI World Tour, race 12 of 29
- Event poster with previous winner Mathieu van der Poel

Race details
- Dates: 4 April 2021
- Stages: 1
- Distance: 263.7 km (163.9 mi)
- Winning time: 6h 02' 12"

Results
	Winner	Kasper Asgreen (DEN)	(Elegant–Quick-Step)
	Second	Mathieu van der Poel (NED)	(Alpecin–Fenix)
	Third	Greg Van Avermaet (BEL)	(AG2R Citroën Team)

The 105th edition of the Tour of Flanders (men's race) one-day cycling classic took place on 4 April 2021, as the 12th event of the 2021 UCI World Tour. The race began in Antwerp and covered 254.3 kilometres (158.0 mi) on the way to the finish in Oudenaarde.

== Teams ==
All nineteen UCI WorldTeams and six UCI ProTeams participated in the race, of which only Groupama–FDJ, with six riders, did not enter the maximum of seven riders. From the field of 174 riders, there were 113 finishers.

UCI WorldTeams

- AG2R Citroën Team
- Astana–Premier Tech
- Bora–Hansgrohe
- Cofidis
- Elegant–Quick-Step (Note: For this race, Deceuninck–Quick-Step competed with 'Elegant–Quick-Step' jerseys to promote one of Deceuninck's window products.)
- EF Education–Nippo
- Groupama–FDJ
- INEOS Grenadiers
- Intermarché–Wanty–Gobert Matériaux
- Israel Start-Up Nation
- Lotto–Soudal
- Movistar Team
- Team Bahrain Victorious
- Team BikeExchange
- Team DSM
- Team Jumbo–Visma
- Team Qhubeka Assos
- Trek–Segafredo
- UAE Team Emirates

UCI ProTeams

- Alpecin–Fenix
- Arkéa–Samsic
- B&B Hotels p/b KTM
- Bingoal Pauwels Sauces WB
- Sport Vlaanderen–Baloise
- Total Direct Énergie

== Result ==
Result
Rank	Rider	Team	Time
1	Kasper Asgreen (DEN)	Elegant–Quick-Step	6h 02' 12"
2	Mathieu van der Poel (NED)	Alpecin–Fenix	+ 0"
3	Greg Van Avermaet (BEL)	AG2R Citroën Team	+ 32"
4	Jasper Stuyven (BEL)	Trek–Segafredo	+ 33"
5	Sep Vanmarcke (BEL)	Israel Start-Up Nation	+ 47"
6	Wout van Aert (BEL)	Team Jumbo–Visma	+ 47"
7	Gianni Vermeersch (BEL)	Alpecin–Fenix	+ 47"
8	Anthony Turgis (FRA)	Total Direct Énergie	+ 47"
9	Florian Sénéchal (FRA)	Elegant–Quick-Step	+ 47"
10	Dylan van Baarle (NED)	INEOS Grenadiers	+ 47"
