= 2021 Primus Classic =

2021 UCI Europe Tour 2021 UCI ProSeries
- Event poster with previous winner Edward Theuns

Race details
- Dates: 18 September 2021
- Stages: 1
- Distance: 197.7 km (122.8 mi)
- Winning time: 4h 34' 05"

Results
	Winner	Florian Sénéchal (FRA)	(Deceuninck–Quick-Step)
	Second	Tosh Van der Sande (BEL)	(Lotto–Soudal)
	Third	Jasper Stuyven (BEL)	(Trek–Segafredo)

The 2021 Primus Classic (also known as the Grand Prix Impanis-Van Petegem) was the 23rd edition of the Primus Classic road cycling one day race, which was held on 18 September 2021 as part of the 2021 UCI Europe Tour and the 2021 UCI ProSeries calendars. This edition was the race's first in the UCI ProSeries; the 2020 edition was expected to feature in the inaugural UCI ProSeries but was cancelled due to the COVID-19 pandemic.

The race's hilly route covered 197.7 kilometres (122.8 mi) from Brakel in East Flanders to Haacht in Flemish Brabant. Almost immediately from the start, riders took on the Tenbosse, the first of many short but steep hills. The majority of the hills came between 100 kilometres (62 mi) and 170 kilometres (110 mi) into the race, with some of them cobbled. The last hill, the Hulstbergstraat, was crested with just under 20 kilometres (12 mi) to go, and from there, the conclusion of the race was net downhill to the finish line near Boortmeerbeek/Wespelaar in Haacht, just outside a Primus brewery.

The first major selection of favourites happened with just over 40 kilometres (25 mi), with Mathieu van der Poel (Alpecin–Fenix) and defending world road race champion Julian Alaphilippe (Deceuninck–Quick-Step) the first to initiate attacks. Deceuninck–Quick-Step were the main presence in this group, making up five of the eleven out in front. Van der Poel suffered a puncture with 23 kilometres (14 mi), dropping him from the group. A few kilometres later, further attacks reduced the group to just five riders; these were Tosh Van der Sande (Lotto–Soudal), Simon Clarke (Team Qhubeka NextHash), Jasper Stuyven (Trek–Segafredo), and the Deceuninck–Quick-Step duo of Mikkel Frølich Honoré and Florian Sénéchal. Consecutive accelerations from both Deceuninck–Quick-Step riders dropped Clarke, who managed to catch back up in the final kilometre. However, just as he was doing so, Honoré led the group on the finishing straight and gradually increased the pace to lead out Sénéchal. Stuyven was the first to begin sprinting, but Sénéchal came out of his slipstream and sprinted past him before holding off Van der Sande for the win. Sénéchal's victory capped off a dominant performance by Deceuninck–Quick-Step, who finished with five riders in the top ten placings.

== Teams ==
11 of the 19 UCI WorldTeams, five UCI ProTeams, and four UCI Continental teams made up the twenty teams that participated in the race. All but five teams entered a full squad of seven riders; these five teams were Abloc CT, AG2R Citroën Team, EF Education–Nippo, Lotto–Soudal, and Uno-X Pro Cycling Team, and they each entered six riders. There were two non-starters, one each from Bingoal Pauwels Sauces WB and Sport Vlaanderen–Baloise, reducing both teams to six riders. In total, 133 riders started the race, of which 111 finished; however, two riders were disqualified and thus not counted, so there were officially 109 finishers.

UCI WorldTeams

- AG2R Citroën Team
- Bora–Hansgrohe
- Cofidis
- Deceuninck–Quick-Step
- EF Education–Nippo
- Intermarché–Wanty–Gobert Matériaux
- Israel Start-Up Nation
- Lotto–Soudal
- Team DSM
- Team Qhubeka NextHash
- Trek–Segafredo

UCI ProTeams

- Alpecin–Fenix
- Arkéa–Samsic
- Bingoal Pauwels Sauces WB
- Sport Vlaanderen–Baloise
- Uno-X Pro Cycling Team

UCI Continental Teams

- Abloc CT
- BEAT Cycling
- EvoPro Racing
- Tarteletto–Isorex

== Result ==
Result
Rank	Rider	Team	Time
1	Florian Sénéchal (FRA)	Deceuninck–Quick-Step	4h 34' 05"
2	Tosh Van der Sande (BEL)	Lotto–Soudal	+ 0"
3	Jasper Stuyven (BEL)	Trek–Segafredo	+ 0"
4	Mikkel Frølich Honoré (DEN)	Deceuninck–Quick-Step	+ 0"
5	Simon Clarke (AUS)	Team Qhubeka NextHash	+ 4"
6	Yves Lampaert (BEL)	Deceuninck–Quick-Step	+ 4"
7	Zdeněk Štybar (CZE)	Deceuninck–Quick-Step	+ 1' 00"
8	Mathieu van der Poel (NED)	Alpecin–Fenix	+ 1' 00"
9	Giacomo Nizzolo (ITA)	Team Qhubeka NextHash	+ 1' 00"
10	Davide Ballerini (ITA)	Deceuninck–Quick-Step	+ 1' 00"
