= Davide Ballerini =

Italian bicycle racer

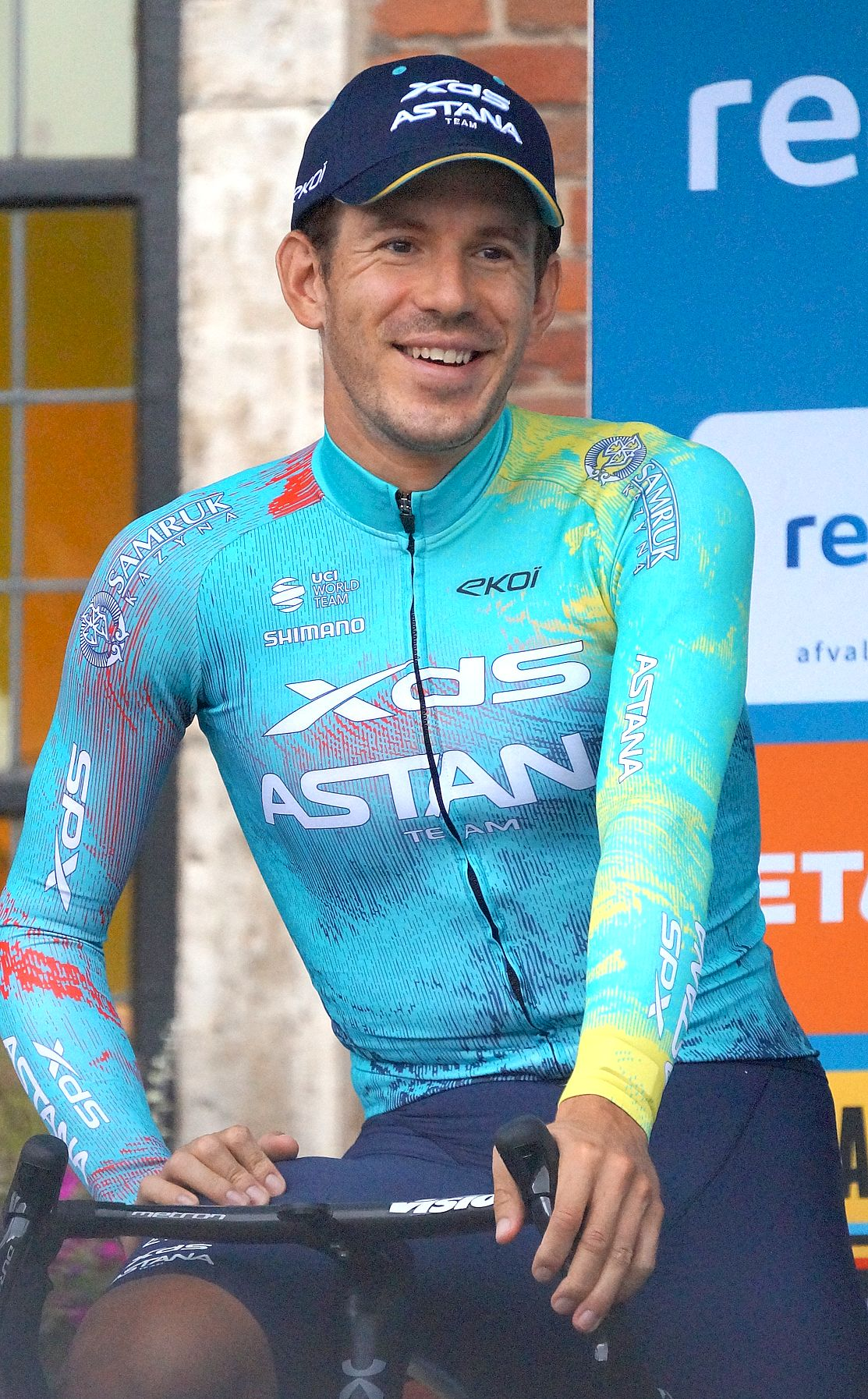
- Ballerini in 2026

Personal information
- Full name: Davide Ballerini
- Born: 21 September 1994 (age 32) Cantù, Italy
- Height: 1.83 m (6 ft 0 in)
- Weight: 77 kg (170 lb)

Cycling career
- Sport: Cycling
- Current team: XDS Astana Team
- Discipline: Road
- Role: Rider

Amateur teams
- 2010: G.S.C. Capiaghese
- 2011: Canturino 1902
- 2012: U.S. Biassono
- 2016: Hopplà Petroli Firenze

Professional teams
- 2013–2014: Team Idea
- 2015: Unieuro–Wilier
- 2016: Tinkoff (stagiaire)
- 2017–2018: Androni Giocattoli–Sidermec
- 2019: Astana
- 2020–2023: Deceuninck–Quick-Step
- 2024–: Astana Qazaqstan Team

Major wins
- Grand Tours Giro d'Italia 1 individual stage (2026) One-day Races and Classics Omloop Het Nieuwsblad (2021) Coppa Bernocchi (2022)
Medal record
Representing Italy
Men's road bicycle racing
European Games
Gold medal – first place	2019 Minsk	Road race

Davide Ballerini (born 21 September 1994) is an Italian cyclist, who currently rides for UCI WorldTeam XDS Astana Team.

Professional since 2017, he has won the 2021 Omloop Het Nieuwsblad and the 2022 Coppa Bernocchi and was the 2019 European Games gold medalist in the road race. He has also competed in five Grand Tours and won a stage of the 2020 Tour de Pologne. He won stage six of the 2026 Giro d'Italia, outsprinting Jasper Stuyven after a crash prevented a number of the sprinters from contesting the win.

He is not related to former two-time Paris–Roubaix winner Franco Ballerini.

== Major results ==
=== Gravel ===
2022
9th UCI World Championships

=== Road ===
2012
3rd Road race, UEC European Junior Championships
2014
1st Stage 8 Rás Tailteann
3rd Overall Course de la Solidarité Olympique

1st Young rider classification

2015
3rd Trofeo Alcide Degasperi
10th Piccolo Giro di Lombardia
2016
4th Coppa dei Laghi-Trofeo Almar
7th Piccolo Giro di Lombardia
9th Ronde van Vlaanderen Beloften
2017
1st Mountains classification, Tirreno–Adriatico
9th Memorial Marco Pantani
10th Coppa Bernocchi
2018 (3 pro wins)
1st Memorial Marco Pantani
1st Trofeo Matteotti
1st Prologue Sibiu Cycling Tour
3rd Gran Piemonte
3rd GP Industria & Artigianato di Larciano
5th Giro dell'Appennino
2019 (1)
1st Road race, European Games
1st Mountains classification, Tour of California
4th Brussels Cycling Classic
2020 (1)
1st Stage 5 Tour de Pologne
2nd Road race, National Championships
2nd Brussels Cycling Classic
4th Druivenkoers Overijse
6th Road race, UEC European Championships
2021 (3)
1st Omloop Het Nieuwsblad
Tour de la Provence

1st Points classification
1st Stages 1 & 2

10th Primus Classic
2022 (2)
1st Coppa Bernocchi
1st Stage 4 Tour de Wallonie
2023
6th Omloop Het Nieuwsblad
7th Dwars door Vlaanderen
2024
9th Gooikse Pijl
2025
6th Gent–Wevelgem
10th Tour of Flanders
2026 (2)
1st Stage 6 Giro d'Italia
1st Stage 7 Tour of Turkiye

==== Grand Tour general classification results timeline ====
Grand Tour	2018	2019	2020	2021	2022	2023	2024	2025	2026
Giro d'Italia	68	—	72	—	99	DNF	70	—	DNF
Tour de France	—	—	—	108	—	—	140	135	152
Vuelta a España	—	—	—	—	—	—	—	—	—

Legend
—	Did not compete
DNF	Did not finish
IP	In progress
