= 2021 Cofidis season =

Cofidis
- 2021 season
- UCI code: COF
- Status: UCI WorldTeam
- World Tour Rank: 15th
- Manager: Yvon Sanquer (FRA)
- Main sponsor(s): Cofidis
- Based: France
- Bicycles: De Rosa
- Groupset: Campagnolo

Season victories
- One-day races: 7
- Stage race stages: 5
- Most wins: Christophe Laporte (FRA); Elia Viviani (ITA); (5 each)
- Best ranked rider: Christophe Laporte (FRA) (41st)
- Jersey

The 2021 season for the Cofidis road cycling team was its 25th season overall and the second consecutive year as a UCI WorldTeam.

== Team roster ==
As of 1 August 2021.

Rider	Date of birth
Piet Allegaert (BEL)	20 January 1995 (aged 25)
Fernando Barceló (ESP)	6 January 1996 (aged 24)
Natnael Berhane (ERI)	5 January 1991 (aged 29)
Tom Bohli (SUI)	17 January 1994 (aged 26)
André Carvalho (POR)	31 October 1997 (aged 23)
Thomas Champion (FRA)	8 September 1999 (aged 21)
Simone Consonni (ITA)	12 September 1994 (aged 26)
Jempy Drucker (LUX)	3 September 1986 (aged 34)
Nicolas Edet (FRA)	2 November 1987 (aged 33)
Rubén Fernández (ESP)	1 March 1991 (aged 29)
Eddy Finé (FRA)	20 November 1997 (aged 23)
Simon Geschke (GER)	13 March 1986 (aged 34)
Nathan Haas (AUS)	12 May 1989 (aged 31)
Jesús Herrada (ESP)	26 July 1990 (aged 30)
José Herrada (ESP)	1 October 1985 (aged 35)
Victor Lafay (FRA)	17 January 1996 (aged 24)

Rider	Date of birth
Jacques Lebreton (Note: Lebreton, Toumire, and Zingle joined as stagiaires on 1 August from EC Saint-Étienne, VC Rouen 76, and CC Étupes, respectively.) (FRA)	5 June 1999 (aged 21)
Christophe Laporte (FRA)	11 December 1992 (aged 28)
Guillaume Martin (FRA)	9 June 1993 (aged 27)
Emmanuel Morin (FRA)	13 March 1995 (aged 25)
Anthony Perez (FRA)	22 April 1991 (aged 29)
Pierre-Luc Périchon (FRA)	4 January 1987 (aged 33)
Rémy Rochas (FRA)	18 May 1996 (aged 24)
Fabio Sabatini (ITA)	8 February 1985 (aged 35)
Szymon Sajnok (POL)	24 August 1997 (aged 23)
Hugo Toumire (FRA)	5 October 2001 (aged 19)
Kenneth Vanbilsen (BEL)	1 June 1990 (aged 30)
Attilio Viviani (ITA)	18 October 1996 (aged 24)
Elia Viviani (ITA)	7 February 1989 (aged 31)
Jelle Wallays (BEL)	11 May 1989 (aged 31)
Axel Zingle (FRA)	18 December 1998 (aged 22)

Riders who joined the team for the 2021 season

Rider	2020 team
Tom Bohli	UAE Team Emirates
André Carvalho	neo-pro (Hagens Berman Axeon)
Thomas Champion	neo-pro (Bourg-en-Bresse Ain)
Jempy Drucker	Bora–Hansgrohe
Rubén Fernández	Euskaltel–Euskadi
Simon Geschke	CCC Team
Rémy Rochas	Nippo–Delko–One Provence
Szymon Sajnok	CCC Team
Jelle Wallays	Lotto–Soudal

Riders who left the team during or after the 2020 season

Rider	2021 team
Dimitri Claeys	Team Qhubeka Assos
Jesper Hansen	Riwal Cycling Team
Mathias Le Turnier	Delko
Cyril Lemoine	B&B Hotels p/b KTM
Luis Ángel Maté	Euskaltel–Euskadi
Marco Mathis	
Stéphane Rossetto	St. Michel–Auber93
Damien Touzé	AG2R Citroën Team
Julien Vermote	Alpecin–Fenix

== Season victories ==
Date	Race	Competition	Rider	Country	Location	Ref.
3 February	Étoile de Bessèges, Stage 1	UCI Europe Tour	Christophe Laporte (FRA)	France	Bellegarde	
7 February	Étoile de Bessèges, Points classification	UCI Europe Tour	Christophe Laporte (FRA)	France		
14 March	Paris–Nice, Mountains classification	UCI World Tour	Anthony Perez (FRA)	France		
28 March	Cholet-Pays de la Loire	UCI Europe Tour	Elia Viviani (ITA)	France	Cholet	
18 April	Volta a la Comunitat Valenciana, Young rider classification	UCI Europe Tour; UCI ProSeries	Victor Lafay (FRA)	Spain		
13 May	Circuit de Wallonie	UCI Europe Tour	Christophe Laporte (FRA)	Belgium	Charleroi	
14 May	Trofeo Serra de Tramuntana	UCI Europe Tour	Jesús Herrada (ESP)	Spain	Deià	
15 May	Giro d'Italia, Stage 8	UCI World Tour	Victor Lafay (FRA)	Italy	Guardia Sanframondi	
24 May	Mercan'Tour Classic Alpes-Maritimes	UCI Europe Tour	Guillaume Martin (FRA)	France	Col de Valberg	
8 August	Arctic Race of Norway, Young rider classification	UCI Europe Tour; UCI ProSeries	Victor Lafay (FRA)	Norway		
17 August	Tour du Limousin, Stage 1	UCI Europe Tour	Christophe Laporte (FRA)	France	Sainte-Feyre	
24 August	Tour Poitou-Charentes en Nouvelle-Aquitaine, Stage 1	UCI Europe Tour	Elia Viviani (ITA)	France	Parthenay	
26 August	Tour Poitou-Charentes en Nouvelle-Aquitaine, Stage 3	UCI Europe Tour	Elia Viviani (ITA)	France	Loudun	
27 August	Tour Poitou-Charentes en Nouvelle-Aquitaine, Points classification	UCI Europe Tour	Simone Consonni (ITA)	France		
12 September	Grand Prix de Fourmies	UCI Europe Tour; UCI ProSeries	Elia Viviani (ITA)	France	Fourmies	
15 September	Grand Prix de Wallonie	UCI Europe Tour; UCI ProSeries	Christophe Laporte (FRA)	Belgium	Namur (Citadel of Namur)	
19 September	Grand Prix d'Isbergues	UCI Europe Tour	Elia Viviani (ITA)	France	Isbergues	
