= 2021 Groupama–FDJ season =

Groupama–FDJ
- 2021 season
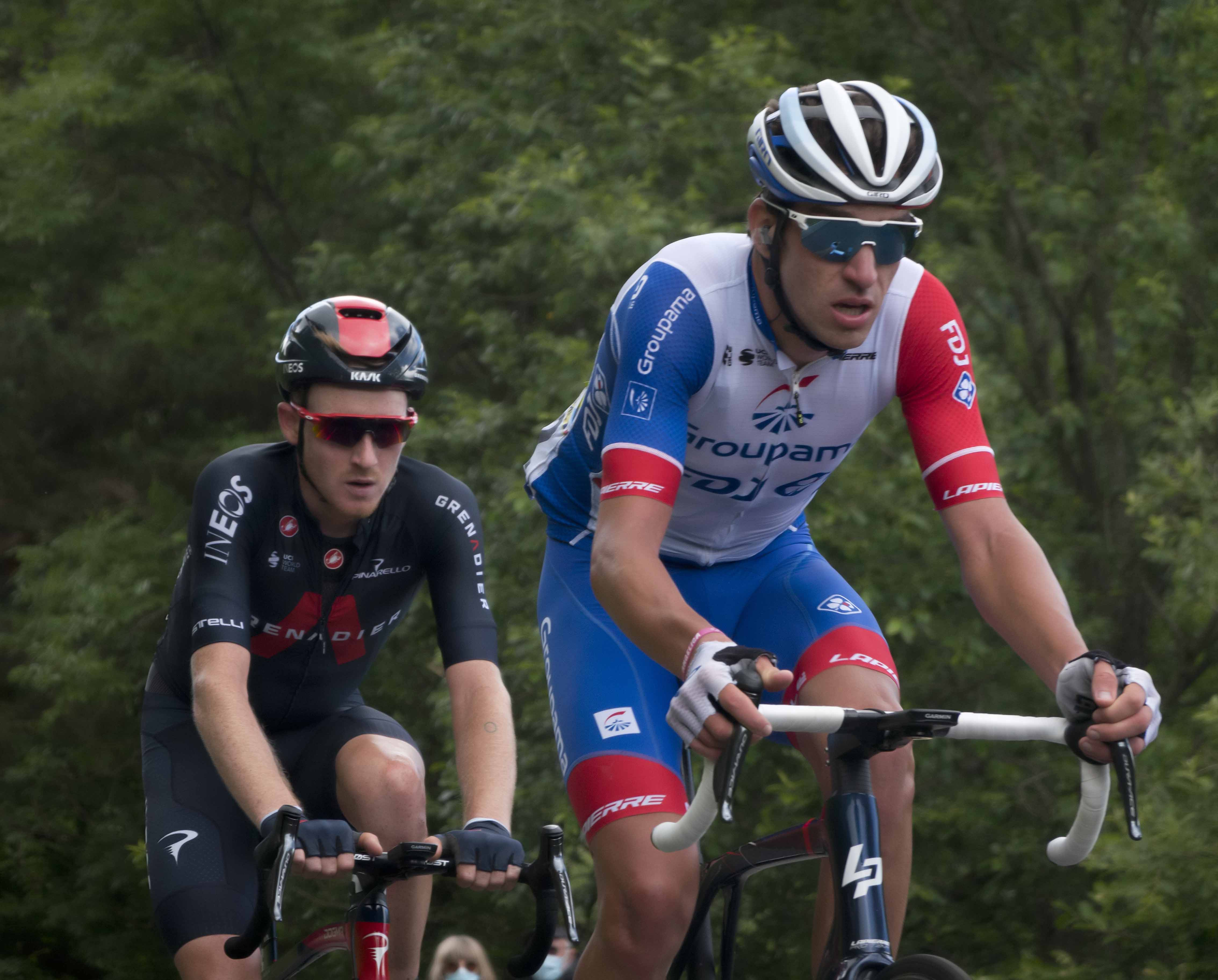
- David Gaudu (right) on Stage 17 of the Tour de France
- UCI code: GFC
- Status: UCI WorldTeam
- World Tour Rank: 9th
- Manager: Marc Madiot (FRA)
- Main sponsor(s): Française des Jeux; Groupama
- Based: France
- Bicycles: Lapierre
- Groupset: Shimano

Season victories
- One-day races: 5
- Stage race overall: 2
- Stage race stages: 11
- National Championships: 5
- Most wins: Arnaud Démare (FRA) (11)
- Best ranked rider: David Gaudu (FRA) (16th)
- Jersey

The 2021 season for Groupama–FDJ was the 25th season in the team's existence and the fourth under the current name. The team has been a UCI WorldTeam since 2005, when the tier was first established.

== Team roster ==
As of 10 June 2021.

Rider	Date of birth
Bruno Armirail (FRA)	11 April 1994 (aged 26)
Matteo Badilatti (SUI)	30 July 1992 (aged 28)
William Bonnet (FRA)	25 June 1982 (aged 38)
Alexys Brunel (FRA)	10 October 1998 (aged 22)
Clément Davy (FRA)	17 July 1998 (aged 22)
Mickaël Delage (FRA)	6 August 1985 (aged 35)
Arnaud Démare (FRA)	26 August 1991 (aged 29)
Antoine Duchesne (CAN)	12 September 1991 (aged 29)
David Gaudu (FRA)	10 October 1996 (aged 24)
Kévin Geniets (LUX)	9 January 1997 (aged 23)
Jacopo Guarnieri (ITA)	14 August 1987 (aged 33)
Simon Guglielmi (FRA)	1 July 1997 (aged 23)
Ignatas Konovalovas (LIT)	8 December 1985 (aged 35)
Stefan Küng (SUI)	16 November 1993 (aged 27)
Mathieu Ladagnous (FRA)	12 December 1984 (aged 36)

Rider	Date of birth
Olivier Le Gac (FRA)	27 August 1993 (aged 27)
Fabian Lienhard (SUI)	3 September 1993 (aged 27)
Tobias Ludvigsson (SWE)	22 February 1991 (aged 29)
Valentin Madouas (FRA)	12 July 1996 (aged 24)
Rudy Molard (FRA)	17 September 1989 (aged 31)
Thibaut Pinot (FRA)	29 May 1990 (aged 30)
Sébastien Reichenbach (SUI)	28 May 1989 (aged 31)
Anthony Roux (FRA)	18 April 1987 (aged 33)
Miles Scotson (AUS)	18 January 1994 (aged 26)
Romain Seigle (FRA)	11 October 1994 (aged 26)
Ramon Sinkeldam (NED)	9 February 1989 (aged 31)
Jake Stewart (GBR)	2 October 1999 (aged 21)
Benjamin Thomas (FRA)	12 September 1995 (aged 25)
Attila Valter (HUN)	12 June 1998 (aged 22)
Lars van den Berg (NED)	7 July 1998 (aged 22)

Riders who joined the team for the 2021 season

Rider	2020 team
Matteo Badilatti	Israel Start-Up Nation
Clément Davy	neo-pro (Équipe Continentale Groupama–FDJ)
Attila Valter	CCC Team
Lars van den Berg	neo-pro (Équipe Continentale Groupama–FDJ)

Riders who left the team during or after the 2020 season

Rider	2021 team
Kilian Frankiny	Team Qhubeka Assos
Marc Sarreau	AG2R Citroën Team
Léo Vincent	CC Etupes

== Season victories ==
Date	Race	Competition	Rider	Country	Location	Ref.
7 February	Étoile de Bessèges, Young rider classification	UCI Europe Tour	Jake Stewart (GBR)	France		
21 February	Tour des Alpes-Maritimes et du Var, Young rider classification	UCI Europe Tour	David Gaudu (FRA)	France		
21 February	Tour des Alpes-Maritimes et du Var, Team classification	UCI Europe Tour	(Note: The riders in the squad were Bruno Armirail, Antoine Duchesne, David Gaudu, Simon Guglielmi, Valentin Madouas, Rudy Molard, and Thibaut Pinot.)	France		
27 February	Faun-Ardèche Classic	UCI Europe Tour; UCI ProSeries	David Gaudu (FRA)	France	Guilherand-Granges	
4 April	La Roue Tourangelle	UCI Europe Tour	Arnaud Démare (FRA)	France	Tours	
10 April	Tour of the Basque Country, Stage 6	UCI World Tour	David Gaudu (FRA)	Spain	Arrate (Eibar)	
14 April	Volta a la Comunitat Valenciana, Stage 1	UCI Europe Tour; UCI ProSeries	Miles Scotson (AUS)	Spain	Ondara	
15 April	Volta a la Comunitat Valenciana, Stage 2	UCI Europe Tour; UCI ProSeries	Arnaud Démare (FRA)	Spain	Alicante	
17 April	Volta a la Comunitat Valenciana, Stage 4 (ITT)	UCI Europe Tour; UCI ProSeries	Stefan Küng (SUI)	Spain	Almenara	
18 April	Volta a la Comunitat Valenciana, Stage 5	UCI Europe Tour; UCI ProSeries	Arnaud Démare (FRA)	Spain	Valencia	
18 April	Volta a la Comunitat Valenciana, Overall	UCI Europe Tour; UCI ProSeries	Stefan Küng (SUI)	Spain		
18 April	Volta a la Comunitat Valenciana, Points classification	UCI Europe Tour; UCI ProSeries	Arnaud Démare (FRA)	Spain		
28 May	Boucles de la Mayenne, Stage 2	UCI Europe Tour; UCI ProSeries	Arnaud Démare (FRA)	France	Évron	
29 May	Boucles de la Mayenne, Stage 3	UCI Europe Tour; UCI ProSeries	Arnaud Démare (FRA)	France	Craon	
30 May	Boucles de la Mayenne, Stage 4	UCI Europe Tour; UCI ProSeries	Arnaud Démare (FRA)	France	Laval	
30 May	Boucles de la Mayenne, Overall	UCI Europe Tour; UCI ProSeries	Arnaud Démare (FRA)	France		
30 May	Boucles de la Mayenne, Points classification	UCI Europe Tour; UCI ProSeries	Arnaud Démare (FRA)	France		
6 June	Critérium du Dauphiné, Young rider classification	UCI World Tour	David Gaudu (FRA)	France		
6 June	Tour de Suisse, Stage 1 (ITT)	UCI World Tour	Stefan Küng (SUI)	Switzerland	Frauenfeld	
11 June	Route d'Occitanie, Stage 2	UCI Europe Tour	Arnaud Démare (FRA)	France	Auch	
15 August	Polynormande	UCI Europe Tour	Valentin Madouas (FRA)	France	Saint-Martin-de-Landelles	
20 August	Tour du Limousin, Team classification	UCI Europe Tour	(Note: The riders in the squad were Matteo Badilatti, Simon Guglielmi, Mathieu Ladagnous, Valentin Madouas, Thibaut Pinot, Sébastien Reichenbach, and Lars van den Berg.)	France		
18 September	Tour de Luxembourg, Stage 5	UCI Europe Tour; UCI ProSeries	David Gaudu (FRA)	Luxembourg	Luxembourg City (Limpertsberg)	
10 October	Paris–Tours	UCI Europe Tour; UCI ProSeries	Arnaud Démare (FRA)	France	Tours	
17 October	Chrono des Nations (ITT)	UCI Europe Tour	Stefan Küng (SUI)	France	Les Herbiers	

== National, Continental, and World Champions ==
Date	Discipline	Jersey	Rider	Country	Location	Ref.
16 June	Swiss National Time Trial Championships		Stefan Küng (SUI)	Switzerland	Lausanne	
17 June	French National Time Trial Championships		Benjamin Thomas (FRA)	France	Épinal	
18 June	Luxembourg National Time Trial Championships		Kevin Geniets (LUX)	Luxembourg	Harlange	
20 June	Luxembourg National Road Race Championships		Kevin Geniets (LUX)	Luxembourg	Harlange	
20 June	Lithuanian National Road Race Championships		Ignatas Konovalovas (LTU)	Estonia (Note: The Estonian, Latvian, and Lithuanian national road race championships were held together as one event, the Baltic Road Race Championships. The best placed rider from each country was deemed their respective country's national champion.)	Valga	
9 September	European Time Trial Championships		Stefan Küng (SUI)	Italy	Trento	
