= 2021 Coppa Sabatini =

- 2021 UCI Europe Tour; 2021 UCI ProSeries

Race details
- Dates: 16 September 2021
- Stages: 1
- Distance: 210.82 km (131.0 mi)
- Winning time: 5h 14' 20"

Results
	Winner	Michael Valgren (DEN)	(EF Education–Nippo)
	Second	Sonny Colbrelli (ITA)	(Team Bahrain Victorious)
	Third	Mathieu Burgaudeau (FRA)	(Team TotalEnergies)

The 2021 Coppa Sabatini (also known as the Gran Premio città di Peccioli) was the 69th edition of the Coppa Sabatini road cycling one day race, which was held on 16 September 2021 as part of the 2021 UCI Europe Tour and the 2021 UCI ProSeries calendars.

The race's hilly route covered 210.82 kilometres (131.00 mi) in and around Peccioli, located in the Province of Pisa in Tuscany, and had three parts, each of which started and finished in Peccioli. The first part was a 47.83-kilometre (29.72 mi) circuit that featured the hills of Montefoscoli, Terricciola, Lajatico, and the Piazza del Popolo hill in Peccioli. Riders then took on five laps of a 25.21-kilometre (15.66 mi) circuit with all the aforementioned hills except Lajatico. The race concluded with three laps of a 12.29-kilometre (7.64 mi) circuit, which finished atop the Via Mazzini hill in Peccioli.

With around 35 kilometres (22 mi) to go, as the peloton was beginning the first of three laps of the final circuit, a group of eight riders made a decisive move, attacking from the peloton. Neilson Powless (EF Education–Nippo) was the first to try a solo attack, but he was brought back with under 3 kilometres (1.9 mi) to go. In the final kilometre, Gianni Moscon (Ineos Grenadiers) tried to accelerate away but was quickly closed down, before Powless's teammate Michael Valgren, winner of the Giro della Toscana the day before, made what would be the winning acceleration. Only Sonny Colbrelli (Team Bahrain Victorious), the recently crowned European road race champion, was able to follow Valgren. In the finishing straight, Valgren continued to accelerate, distancing Colbrelli for the victory. From the rest of the contending octet, Mathieu Burgaudeau (Team TotalEnergies) finished third.

== Teams ==
Seven of the 19 UCI WorldTeams, eight UCI ProTeams, two UCI Continental teams, and the Italian national team made up the eighteen teams that participated in the race. Each team entered a squad of seven riders, for a total of 126 riders. Only 49 riders finished the race.

UCI WorldTeams

- Astana–Premier Tech
- EF Education–Nippo
- Ineos Grenadiers
- Intermarché–Wanty–Gobert Matériaux
- Movistar Team
- Team Bahrain Victorious
- UAE Team Emirates

UCI ProTeams

- Androni Giocattoli–Sidermec
- Bardiani–CSF–Faizanè
- Burgos BH
- Eolo–Kometa
- Euskaltel–Euskadi
- Gazprom–RusVelo
- Team TotalEnergies
- Vini Zabù

UCI Continental Teams

- D'Amico–UM Tools
- MG.K Vis VPM

National Teams

- Italy

== Result ==
Result
Rank	Rider	Team	Time
1	Michael Valgren (DEN)	EF Education–Nippo	5h 14' 20"
2	Sonny Colbrelli (ITA)	Team Bahrain Victorious	+ 3"
3	Mathieu Burgaudeau (FRA)	Team TotalEnergies	+ 6"
4	Filippo Baroncini (ITA)	Italy	+ 9"
5	Lorenzo Rota (ITA)	Intermarché–Wanty–Gobert Matériaux	+ 11"
6	Neilson Powless (USA)	EF Education–Nippo	+ 17"
7	Gianni Moscon (ITA)	Ineos Grenadiers	+ 33"
8	Antonio Pedrero (ESP)	Movistar Team	+ 40"
9	Ander Okamika (ESP)	Burgos BH	+ 1' 25"
10	Ruben Guerreiro (POR)	EF Education–Nippo	+ 1' 31"
