= 2021 Grand Prix de Wallonie =

2021 UCI Europe Tour 2021 UCI ProSeries
- Event poster with previous winner Krists Neilands

Race details
- Dates: 14 September 2021
- Stages: 1
- Distance: 208.1 km (129.3 mi)
- Winning time: 4h 59' 57"

Results
	Winner	Christophe Laporte (FRA)	(Cofidis)
	Second	Warren Barguil (FRA)	(Arkéa–Samsic)
	Third	Tosh Van der Sande (BEL)	(Lotto–Soudal)

The 2021 Grand Prix de Wallonie was the 61st edition of the Grand Prix de Wallonie road cycling one day race, which was held on 14 September 2021 as part of the 2021 UCI Europe Tour and the 2021 UCI ProSeries calendars. This edition was the race's first in the UCI ProSeries; the 2020 edition was expected to feature in the inaugural UCI ProSeries but was cancelled due to the COVID-19 pandemic.

The race's hilly route covered 208.1-kilometre (129.3 mi) in Wallonia from Aywaille to Namur, and finished near the Citadel of Namur. After travelling west from the start, riders reached the outskirts of Namur and entered a local circuit after 138.5 kilometres (86.1 mi). The first passage through the finish line came after 167 kilometres (104 mi), from which point riders completed the full 41.1-kilometre (25.5 mi) circuit once. The race then conclude with a 2.7-kilometre (1.7 mi) climb up to the citadel.

After a late attack from Matis Louvel (Arkéa–Samsic) in the final kilometre was brought back, Christophe Laporte (Cofidis) won the uphill sprint from a reduced bunch ahead of Louvel's teammate Warren Barguil, while Tosh Van der Sande (Lotto–Soudal) finished third.

== Teams ==
Nine of the 19 UCI WorldTeams, seven UCI ProTeams, and four UCI Continental teams made up the twenty teams that participated in the race. All but five teams entered a full squad of seven riders; these five teams were EF Education–Nippo, Hagens Berman Axeon, Riwal Cycling Team, Sport Vlaanderen–Baloise, and Team Qhubeka NextHash, and they each entered six riders. In total, 135 riders started the race, of which 89 finished.

UCI WorldTeams

- AG2R Citroën Team
- Bora–Hansgrohe
- Cofidis
- EF Education–Nippo
- Intermarché–Wanty–Gobert Matériaux
- Israel Start-Up Nation
- Lotto–Soudal
- Team DSM
- Team Qhubeka NextHash

UCI ProTeams

- Alpecin–Fenix
- Arkéa–Samsic
- B&B Hotels p/b KTM
- Bingoal Pauwels Sauces WB
- Sport Vlaanderen–Baloise
- Team TotalEnergies
- Uno-X Pro Cycling Team

UCI Continental Teams

- Hagens Berman Axeon
- Riwal Cycling Team
- Tarteletto–Isorex
- Xelliss–Roubaix–Lille Métropole

== Result ==
Result
Rank	Rider	Team	Time
1	Christophe Laporte (FRA)	Cofidis	4h 59' 57"
2	Warren Barguil (FRA)	Arkéa–Samsic	+ 0"
3	Tosh Van der Sande (BEL)	Lotto–Soudal	+ 0"
4	Dorian Godon (FRA)	AG2R Citroën Team	+ 0"
5	Gianni Vermeersch (BEL)	Alpecin–Fenix	+ 0"
6	Rasmus Tiller (NOR)	Uno-X Pro Cycling Team	+ 0"
7	Patrick Konrad (AUT)	Bora–Hansgrohe	+ 0"
8	Tom Van Asbroeck (BEL)	Israel Start-Up Nation	+ 0"
9	Tiesj Benoot (BEL)	Team DSM	+ 0"
10	Dimitri Claeys (BEL)	Team Qhubeka NextHash	+ 0"
