= 2021 UCI Europe Tour =

Seventeenth season of the UCI Europe Tour

- Seventeenth edition of the UCI Europe Tour

Details
- Dates: 24 January – 24 October
- Location: Europe
- Races: 221

Champions
- Individual champion: Tadej Pogačar (SLO) (UAE Team Emirates)
- Teams' champion: Alpecin–Fenix (BEL)
- Nations' champion: Belgium

The 2021 UCI Europe Tour was the 17th season of the UCI Europe Tour. The season began on 24 January 2021 with the Clàssica Comunitat Valenciana 1969 – Gran Premio Valencia and ended on 24 October 2021 with the Ronde van Drenthe.

Throughout the season, points were awarded to the top finishers of stages within stage races and the final general classification standings of each of the stages races and one-day events. The quality and complexity of a race also determined how many points are awarded to the top finishers; the higher the UCI rating of a race, the more points were awarded.

The UCI ratings from highest to lowest are as follows:

- Multi-day events: 2.Pro, 2.1 and 2.2
- One-day events: 1.Pro, 1.1 and 1.2

== Events ==
=== January ===
Date	Race name	Location	UCI Rating	Winner	Team	Ref.
24 January	Trofeo Luis Puig	Spain	1.2	Lorrenzo Manzin (FRA)	Total Direct Énergie	
31 January	Grand Prix la Marseillaise	France	1.1	Aurélien Paret-Peintre (FRA)	AG2R Citroën Team	

=== February ===
Date	Race name	Location	UCI Rating	Winner	Team	Ref.
3–7 February	Étoile de Bessèges – Tour du Gard	France	2.1	Tim Wellens (BEL)	Lotto–Soudal	
6 February	Grand Prix Alanya	Turkey	1.2	Davide Gabburo (ITA)	Bardiani–CSF–Faizanè	
7 February	Grand Prix Gazipaşa	Turkey	1.2	Raman Tsishkou (BLR)	BelAZ	
11–14 February	Tour de la Provence	France	2.Pro	Iván Sosa (COL)	INEOS Grenadiers	
14 February	Clásica de Almería	Spain	1.Pro	Giacomo Nizzolo (ITA)	Team Qhubeka Assos	
19–21 February	Tour des Alpes-Maritimes et du Var	France	2.1	Gianluca Brambilla (ITA)	Trek–Segafredo	
20 February	Grand Prix Velo Manavgat	Turkey	1.2	Harrif Saleh (MAS)	Terengganu Cycling Team	
21 February	Grand Prix Velo Alanya	Turkey	1.2	Carlos Quintero (COL)	Terengganu Cycling Team	
27 February	Faun-Ardèche Classic	France	1.Pro	David Gaudu (FRA)	Groupama–FDJ	
28 February	Royal Bernard Drôme Classic	France	1.Pro	Andrea Bagioli (ITA)	Deceuninck–Quick-Step	
28 February	Kuurne–Bruxelles–Kuurne	Belgium	1.Pro	Mads Pedersen (DEN)	Trek–Segafredo	

=== March ===
Date	Race name	Location	UCI Rating	Winner	Team	Ref.
2 March	Le Samyn	Belgium	1.1	Tim Merlier (BEL)	Alpecin–Fenix	
3 March	Trofeo Laigueglia	Italy	1.Pro	Bauke Mollema (NED)	Trek–Segafredo	
3 March	Umag Trophy	Croatia	1.2	Jakub Mareczko (ITA)	Vini Zabù	
6 March	Grand Prix Mediterranean	Turkey	1.2	Onur Balkan (TUR)	Salcano–Sakarya BB Team	
7 March	GP Industria & Artigianato	Italy	1.Pro	Mauri Vansevenant (BEL)	Deceuninck–Quick-Step	
7 March	Grote Prijs Jean-Pierre Monseré	Belgium	1.1	Tim Merlier (BEL)	Alpecin–Fenix	
7 March	Poreč Trophy	Croatia	1.2	Filippo Fiorelli (ITA)	Bardiani–CSF–Faizanè	
7 March	Grand Prix Gündoğmuş	Turkey	1.2	Carlos Quintero (COL)	Terengganu Cycling Team	
11–14 March	Istrian Spring Trophy	Croatia	2.2	Finn Fisher-Black (NZL)	Jumbo–Visma Development Team	
14 March	Paris–Troyes	France	1.2	Romain Cardis (FRA)	St. Michel–Auber93	
17 March	Nokere Koerse	Belgium	1.Pro	Ludovic Robeet (BEL)	Bingoal WB	
19 March	Bredene Koksijde Classic	Belgium	1.Pro	Tim Merlier (BEL)	Alpecin–Fenix	
21 March	GP Slovenian Istria	Slovenia	1.2	Mirco Maestri (ITA)	Bardiani–CSF–Faizanè	
21 March	Per sempre Alfredo	Italy	1.1	Matteo Moschetti (ITA)	Trek–Segafredo	
23–27 March	Settimana Internazionale di Coppi e Bartali	Italy	2.1	Jonas Vingegaard (DEN)	Team Jumbo–Visma	
28 March	Cholet-Pays de la Loire	France	1.1	Elia Viviani (ITA)	Cofidis	
28 March	GP Adria Mobil	Slovenia	1.2	Marijn van den Berg (NED)	Équipe Continentale Groupama–FDJ	

=== April ===
Date	Race name	Location	UCI Rating	Winner	Team	Ref.
1–4 April	Tour of Mevlana	Turkey	2.2	Anatoliy Budyak (UKR)	Spor Toto Cycling Team	
3 April	Gran Premio Miguel Induráin	Spain	1.Pro	Alejandro Valverde (ESP)	Movistar Team	
4 April	La Roue Tourangelle	France	1.1	Arnaud Démare (FRA)	Groupama–FDJ	
4 April	International Rhodes Grand Prix	Greece	1.2	Tord Gudmestad (NOR)	Team Coop	
4 April	Trofeo Piva	Italy	1.2U	Juan Ayuso (ESP)	Team Colpack–Ballan	
5 April	Giro del Belvedere	Italy	1.2U	Juan Ayuso (ESP)	Team Colpack–Ballan	
7 April	Scheldeprijs	Belgium	1.Pro	Jasper Philipsen (BEL)	Alpecin–Fenix	
8–11 April	International Tour of Rhodes	Greece	2.2	Fredrik Dversnes (NOR)	Team Coop	
11–18 April	Presidential Tour of Turkey	Turkey	2.Pro	José Manuel Díaz (ESP)	Delko	
14 April	Brabantse Pijl	Belgium	1.Pro	Tom Pidcock (GBR)	INEOS Grenadiers	
14–18 April	Volta a la Comunitat Valenciana	Spain	2.Pro	Stefan Küng (SUI)	Groupama–FDJ	
18 April	Trofeo Città di San Vendemiano	Italy	1.2U	Paul Lapeira (FRA)	AG2R Citroën Team–U23	
19–23 April	Tour of the Alps	Italy/Austria	2.Pro	Simon Yates (GBR)	Team BikeExchange	
22–25 April	Belgrade–Banja Luka	Serbia/Bosnia and Herzegovina	2.1	Mihkel Räim (EST)	HRE Mazowsze Serce Polski	
25 April	Gran Premio della Liberazione	Italy	1.2U	Michele Gazzoli (ITA)	Team Colpack–Ballan	
30 April – 2 May	Vuelta Asturias	Spain	2.1	Nairo Quintana (COL)	Arkéa–Samsic	

=== May ===
Date	Race name	Location	UCI Rating	Winner	Team	Ref.
2 May	Circuito del Porto-Trofeo Arvedi	Italy	1.2	Gleb Syritsa (RUS)	Russia	
2 May	Clássica da Arrábida	Portugal	1.2	Sean Quinn (USA)	Hagens Berman Axeon	
5–9 May	Volta ao Algarve	Portugal	2.Pro	João Rodrigues (POR)	W52 / FC Porto	
12–16 May	Tour de Hongrie	Hungary	2.1	Damien Howson (AUS)	Team BikeExchange	
13 May	Trofeo Calvià	Spain	1.1	Ryan Gibbons (RSA)	UAE Team Emirates	
13 May	Circuit de Wallonie	Belgium	1.1	Christophe Laporte (FRA)	Cofidis	
14 May	Trofeo Serra de Tramuntana	Spain	1.1	Jesús Herrada (ESP)	Cofidis	
14–16 May	Tour d'Eure-et-Loir	France	2.2	Paul Penhoët (FRA)	Équipe Continentale Groupama–FDJ	
15 May	Trofeo Andratx – Mirador d'Es Colomer (Puerto Pollença)	Spain	1.1	Winner Anacona (COL)	Arkéa–Samsic	
16 May	Tro-Bro Léon	France	1.Pro	Connor Swift (GBR)	Arkéa–Samsic	
16 May	Trofeo Alcudia – Port d'Alcudia	Spain	1.1	André Greipel (GER)	Israel Start-Up Nation	
18–22 May	Vuelta a Andalucía	Spain	2.Pro	Miguel Ángel López (COL)	Movistar Team	
19–23 May	Alpes Isère Tour	France	2.2	Sjoerd Bax (NED)	Metec–Solarwatt p/b Mantel	
22 May	Tour du Finistère	France	1.1	Benoît Cosnefroy (FRA)	AG2R Citroën Team	
23 May	Vuelta a Murcia	Spain	1.1	Antonio Jesús Soto (ESP)	Euskaltel–Euskadi	
24 May	Mercan'Tour Classic Alpes-Maritimes	France	1.1	Guillaume Martin (FRA)	Cofidis	
24 May	Ronde van Limburg	Belgium	1.1	Tim Merlier (BEL)	Alpecin–Fenix	
27–30 May	Boucles de la Mayenne	France	2.Pro	Arnaud Démare (FRA)	Groupama–FDJ	
27–30 May	Tour de la Mirabelle	France	2.2	Idar Andersen (NOR)	Uno-X Pro Cycling Team	
28–29 May	Tour of Estonia	Estonia	2.1	Karl Patrick Lauk (EST)	Estonia	
29 May	Grand Prix Herning	Denmark	1.2	Mads Østergaard Kristensen (DEN)	Team ColoQuick	
29–30 May	Orlen Nations Grand Prix	Poland	2.Ncup	Marijn van den Berg (NED)	Netherlands	
30 May	Fyen Rundt	Denmark	1.2	Niklas Larsen (DEN)	Uno-X Pro Cycling Team	
30 May	GP Slovenia	Slovenia	1.2	Mirco Maestri (ITA)	Bardiani–CSF–Faizanè	
30 May	Coppa della Pace	Italy	1.2U	Daan Hoole (NED)	SEG Racing Academy	

=== June ===
Date	Race name	Location	UCI Rating	Winner	Team	Ref.
2 June	Trofeo Alcide Degasperi	Italy	1.2	Riccardo Lucca (ITA)	General Store–Fratelli Curia–Essegibi	
3–6 June	Course de la Paix U23 – Grand Prix Jeseníky	Czech Republic	2.Ncup	Filippo Zana (ITA)	Italy	
3–12 June	Giro Ciclistico d'Italia	Italy	2.2	Juan Ayuso (ESP)	Team Colpack–Ballan	
4 June	Grosser Preis des Kantons Aargau	Switzerland	1.1	Ide Schelling (NED)	Bora–Hansgrohe	
4–6 June	Tour of Małopolska	Poland	2.2	Michal Schlegel (CZE)	Elkov–Kasper	
5 June	Dwars door het Hageland	Belgium	1.Pro	Rasmus Tiller (NOR)	Uno-X Pro Cycling Team	
6 June	Elfstedenronde	Belgium	1.1	Tim Merlier (BEL)	Alpecin–Fenix	
8 June	Mont Ventoux Dénivelé Challenge	France	1.1	Miguel Ángel López (COL)	Movistar Team	
9–13 June	Tour of Belgium	Belgium	2.Pro	Remco Evenepoel (BEL)	Deceuninck–Quick-Step	
9–13 June	Tour of Slovenia	Slovenia	2.Pro	Tadej Pogačar (SLO)	UAE Team Emirates	
9–13 June	Five Rings of Moscow	Russia	2.2	Igor Frolov (RUS)	Moscow Region	
10–13 June	Oberösterreich Rundfahrt	Austria	2.2	Alexis Guérin (FRA)	Team Vorarlberg	
10–13 June	Route d'Occitanie	France	2.1	Antonio Pedrero (ESP)	Movistar Team	
15 June	Paris–Camembert	France	1.1	Dorian Godon (FRA)	AG2R Citroën Team	
15–17 June	Adriatica Ionica Race	Italy	2.1	Lorenzo Fortunato (ITA)	Eolo–Kometa	
23–26 June	Course de Solidarność et des Champions Olympiques	Poland	2.2	Jan Bárta (CZE)	Elkov–Kasper	
23–27 June	Volta ao Alentejo	Portugal	2.2	Mauricio Moreira (URU)	Efapel	
24 June	Giro dell'Appennino	Italy	1.1	Ben Hermans (BEL)	Israel Start-Up Nation	
27 June	Gran Premio di Lugano	Switzerland	1.1	Gianni Moscon (ITA)	INEOS Grenadiers	
28–29 June	In the footsteps of the Romans	Bulgaria	2.2	Immanuel Stark (GER)	P&S Metalltechnik	
30 June – 5 July	Tour of Bulgaria	Bulgaria	2.2	Immanuel Stark (GER)	P&S Metalltechnik	

=== July ===
Date	Race name	Location	UCI Rating	Winner	Team	Ref.
3 July	Germenica Grand Prix Road Race	Turkey	1.2	Christofer Jurado (PAN)	Panamá es Cultura y Valores	
3–6 July	Sibiu Cycling Tour	Romania	2.1	Giovanni Aleotti (ITA)	Bora–Hansgrohe	
4 July	Giro del Medio Brenta	Italy	1.2	Didier Merchán (COL)	Colombia Tierra de Atletas–GW Bicicletas	
4 July	Kahramanmaraş Grand Prix Road Race	Turkey	1.2	Jambaljamts Sainbayar (MGL)	Terengganu Cycling Team	
10 July	Grand Prix Erciyes - Mimar Sinan	Turkey	1.2	Alex Hoehn (USA)	Wildlife Generation Pro Cycling	
10 July	Visegrad 4 Kerekparverseny	Hungary	1.2	Michal Schlegel (CZE)	Elkov–Kasper	
11 July	Grand Prix Kayseri	Turkey	1.2	Anatoliy Budyak (UKR)	Spor Toto Cycling Team	
11 July	Visegrad 4 Bicycle Race – GP Slovakia	Slovakia	1.2	Alan Banaszek (POL)	HRE Mazowsze Serce Polski	
14–17 July	Dookoła Mazowsza	Poland	2.2	Eirik Lunder (NOR)	Team Coop	
14–18 July	Settimana Ciclistica Italiana	Italy	2.1	Diego Ulissi (ITA)	UAE Team Emirates	
15–18 July	Troféu Joaquim Agostinho	Portugal	2.2	Frederico Figueiredo (POR)	Efapel	
16–18 July	Giro della Valle d'Aosta	Italy	2.2U	Reuben Thompson (NZL)	Équipe Continentale Groupama–FDJ	
16–18 July	Tour of Kosovo	Kosovo	2.2	Tristan Delacroix (FRA)	Sprinter Nice Métropole	
17 July	Grand Prix Velo Erciyes	Turkey	1.2	Azzedine Lagab (ALG)	Algeria	
17 July	Visegrad 4 Bicycle Race – GP Czech Republic	Czech Republic	1.2	Adam Ťoupalík (CZE)	Elkov–Kasper	
18 July	Puchar Ministra Obrony Narodowej	Poland	1.2	Louis Bendixen (DEN)	Team Coop	
18 July	Grand Prix Develi	Turkey	1.2	Mykhaylo Kononenko (UKR)	Salcano–Sakarya BB Team	
18 July	Visegrad 4 Bicycle Race – Grand Prix Poland	Poland	1.2	Itamar Einhorn (ISR)	Israel Start-Up Nation	
18 July	Grand Prix de la ville de Nogent-sur-Oise	France	1.2	Karl Patrick Lauk (EST)	Pro Immo Nicolas Roux	
19–20 July	L'Étoile d'Or	France	2.Ncup	Filip Maciejuk (POL)	Poland	
20–24 July	Tour de Wallonie	Belgium	2.Pro	Quinn Simmons (USA)	Trek–Segafredo	
21–25 July	Tour Alsace	France	2.2	José Félix Parra (ESP)	Equipo Kern Pharma	
25 July	Grand Prix de la ville de Pérenchies	France	1.2	Emiel Vermeulen (BEL)	Xelliss–Roubaix–Lille Métropole	
25 July	GP Kranj	Slovenia	1.2	Riccardo Verza (ITA)	Zalf Euromobil Fior	
25 July	Prueba Villafranca – Ordiziako Klasika	Spain	1.1	Luis León Sánchez (ESP)	Astana–Premier Tech	
29 July	Vuelta a Castilla y León	Spain	2.1	Matis Louvel (FRA)	Arkéa–Samsic	
29–31 July	Tour de l'Ain	France	2.1	Michael Storer (AUS)	Team DSM	
30 July – 2 August	Kreiz Breizh Elites	France	2.2	Nick van der Lijke (NED)	Riwal Cycling Team	
31 July	Heistse Pijl	Belgium	1.1	Pascal Eenkhoorn (NED)	Team Jumbo–Visma	

=== August ===
Date	Race name	Location	UCI Rating	Winner	Team	Ref.
1 August	Circuito de Getxo	Spain	1.1	Giacomo Nizzolo (ITA)	Team Qhubeka NextHash	
3–7 August	Vuelta a Burgos	Spain	2.Pro	Mikel Landa (ESP)	Team Bahrain Victorious	
4–7 August	Tour of Szeklerland	Romania	2.2	Alan Banaszek (POL)	HRE Mazowsze Serce Polski	
4–8 August	Tour de Savoie Mont-Blanc	France	2.2	Jefferson Alexander Cepeda (ECU)	Androni Giocattoli–Sidermec	
4–15 August	Volta a Portugal	Portugal	2.1	Amaro Antunes (POR)	W52 / FC Porto	
5–8 August	Arctic Race of Norway	Norway	2.Pro	Ben Hermans (BEL)	Israel Start-Up Nation	
5–8 August	Sazka Tour	Czech Republic	2.1	Filippo Zana (ITA)	Bardiani–CSF–Faizanè	
8 August	Gran Premio di Poggiana	Italy	1.2U	Riccardo Ciuccarelli (ITA)	Biesse–Arvedi	
10–14 August	Danmark Rundt	Denmark	2.Pro	Remco Evenepoel (BEL)	Deceuninck–Quick-Step	
13–22 August	Tour de l'Avenir	France	1.2U	Tobias Halland Johannessen (NOR)	Norway	
15 August	Memoriał Henryka Łasaka	Poland	1.2	Michael Kukrle (CZE)	Elkov–Kasper	
15 August	La Polynormande	France	1.1	Valentin Madouas (FRA)	Groupama–FDJ	
15 August	Grote Prijs Jef Scherens	Belgium	1.1	Niccolò Bonifazio (ITA)	Team TotalEnergies	
16 August	GP Capodarco	Italy	1.2U	Simone Raccani (ITA)	Zalf Euromobil Fior	
17 August	Egmont Cycling Race	Belgium	1.1	Danny van Poppel (NED)	Intermarché–Wanty–Gobert Matériaux	
17–20 August	Tour du Limousin	France	2.1	Warren Barguil (FRA)	Arkéa–Samsic	
19–22 August	Baltic Chain Tour	Estonia	2.2	Laurence Pithie (NZL)	Équipe Continentale Groupama–FDJ	
19–22 August (Note: The Tour of Norway was originally supposed to begin on 19 May but was reduced by two days. In April, the race was postponed from 21–24 May to 19–22 August.)	Tour of Norway	Norway	2.Pro	Ethan Hayter (GBR)	INEOS Grenadiers	
20 August	Grote Prijs Marcel Kint	Belgium	1.1	Álvaro Hodeg (COL)	Deceuninck–Quick-Step	
20–22 August	CCC Tour – Grody Piastowskie	Poland	2.2	Maciej Paterski (POL)	Voster ATS Team	
24–27 August	Tour Poitou-Charentes en Nouvelle-Aquitaine	France	2.1	Connor Swift (GBR)	Arkéa–Samsic	
26 August	Druivenkoers-Overijse	Belgium	1.1	Remco Evenepoel (BEL)	Deceuninck–Quick-Step	
26–29 August	Deutschland Tour	Germany	2.Pro	Nils Politt (GER)	Bora–Hansgrohe	
27–29 August	Tour du Pays de Montbéliard	France	2.2U	Maurice Ballerstedt (GER)	Jumbo–Visma Development Team	
28 August	Brussels Cycling Classic	Belgium	1.Pro	Remco Evenepoel (BEL)	Deceuninck–Quick-Step	
28 August	Adriatic Race	Montenegro	1.2	Nik Čemažar (SLO)	KK Kranj	
28 August	Himmerland Rundt	Denmark	1.2	Mathias Larsen (DEN)	Restaurant Suri–Carl Ras	
29 August	Rent Liv Løbet Skive	Denmark	1.2	Elmar Reinders (NED)	Riwal Cycling Team	
29 August	Grand Prix de la Somme	France	1.2	Tom Mazzone (GBR)	Saint Piran	
29 August	Ronde van de Achterhoek	Netherlands	1.2	Casper van Uden (NED)	Development Team DSM	
29–31 August	Carpathian Couriers Race	Poland	2.2U	Filip Maciejuk (POL)	Poland	
30 August – 4 September	Turul Romaniei	Romania	2.1	Jakub Kaczmarek (POL)	HRE Mazowsze Serce Polski	

=== September ===
Date	Race name	Location	UCI Rating	Winner	Team	Ref.
2–4 September	Flanders Tomorrow Tour	Belgium	2.2U	Mick van Dijke (NED)	Jumbo–Visma Development Team	
2–5 September	Giro della Regione Friuli Venezia Giulia	Italy	2.2	Jonas Rapp (GER)	Hrinkow Advarics Cycleang	
3 September	Classic Grand Besançon Doubs	France	1.1	Biniam Girmay (ERI)	Intermarché–Wanty–Gobert Matériaux	
3–5 September	A Travers les Hauts de France	France	2.2	Jason Tesson (FRA)	St. Michel–Auber93	
4 September	Tour du Jura	France	1.1	Benoît Cosnefroy (FRA)	AG2R Citroën Team	
5–12 September	Tour of Britain	United Kingdom	2.Pro	Wout van Aert (BEL)	Team Jumbo–Visma	
5 September	Tour du Doubs	France	1.1	Dorian Godon (FRA)	AG2R Citroën Team	
8–12 September	Okolo jižních Čech	Czech Republic	2.2	Arnaud de Lie (BEL)	Lotto–Soudal U23	
9–12 September	Tour de Serbie	Serbia	2.2	Jean Goubert (FRA)	Sprinter Nice Métropole	
12 September	Grand Prix de Fourmies	France	1.Pro	Elia Viviani (ITA)	Cofidis	
12 September	Antwerp Port Epic	Belgium	1.1	Mathieu van der Poel (NED)	Alpecin–Fenix	
14–18 September	Tour de Luxembourg	Luxembourg	2.Pro	João Almeida (POR)	Deceuninck–Quick-Step	
15 September	Grand Prix de Wallonie	Belgium	1.Pro	Christophe Laporte (FRA)	Cofidis	
15 September	Giro della Toscana	Italy	1.1	Michael Valgren (DEN)	EF Education–Nippo	
15–19 September	Okolo Slovenska	Slovakia	2.1	Peter Sagan (SVK)	Bora–Hansgrohe	
16 September	Coppa Sabatini	Italy	1.Pro	Michael Valgren (DEN)	EF Education–Nippo	
17 September	Kampioenschap van Vlaanderen	Belgium	1.1	Jasper Philipsen (BEL)	Alpecin–Fenix	
18 September	Primus Classic	Belgium	1.Pro	Florian Sénéchal (FRA)	Deceuninck–Quick-Step	
18 September	Memorial Marco Pantani	Italy	1.1	Sonny Colbrelli (ITA)	Team Bahrain Victorious	
18 September	PWZ Zuidenveld Tour	Netherlands	1.2	Elmar Reinders (NED)	Riwal Cycling Team	
18 September	Liège–Bastogne–Liège U23	Belgium	1.2U	Leo Hayter (GBR)	Development Team DSM	
19 September	Gooikse Pijl	Belgium	1.1	Fabio Jakobsen (NED)	Deceuninck–Quick-Step	
19 September	Grand Prix d'Isbergues	France	1.1	Elia Viviani (ITA)	Cofidis	
19 September	Trofeo Matteotti	Italy	1.1	Matteo Trentin (ITA)	UAE Team Emirates	
20–26 September	Tour de Bretagne	France	2.2	Jean-Louis Le Ny (FRA)	WB-Fybolia Locminé	
21 September	Grand Prix de Denain	France	1.Pro	Jasper Philipsen (BEL)	Alpecin–Fenix	
23 September	Omloop van het Houtland	Belgium	1.1	Taco van der Hoorn (NED)	Intermarché–Wanty–Gobert Matériaux	
26 September	Paris–Chauny	France	1.1	Jasper Philipsen (BEL)	Alpecin–Fenix	
26 September	Dorpenomloop Rucphen	Netherlands	1.2	Elias Van Breussegem (BEL)	Tarteletto–Isorex	
28 September	Ruota d'Oro	Italy	1.2U	Andrea Piccolo (ITA)	Viris Vigevano	
28 September – 1 October	Giro di Sicilia	Italy	2.1	Vincenzo Nibali (ITA)	Trek–Segafredo	
28 September – 3 October	CRO Race	Croatia	2.1	Stephen Williams (GBR)	Team Bahrain Victorious	
29 September	Eurométropole Tour	Belgium	1.Pro	Fabio Jakobsen (NED)	Deceuninck–Quick-Step	
29 September – 3 October	Ronde de l'Isard	France	2.2U	Gijs Leemreize (NED)	Jumbo–Visma Development Team	

=== October ===
Date	Race name	Location	UCI Rating	Winner	Team	Ref.
1 October	Route Adélie de Vitré	France	1.1	Arvid de Kleijn (NED)	Rally Cycling	
2 October	Lillehammer GP	Norway	1.2	Idar Andersen (NOR)	Uno-X Pro Cycling Team	
2 October	Classic Loire Atlantique	France	1.1	Alan Riou (FRA)	Arkéa–Samsic	
2 October	Giro dell'Emilia	Italy	1.Pro	Primož Roglič (SLO)	Team Jumbo–Visma	
3 October	Münsterland Giro	Germany	1.Pro	Mark Cavendish (GBR)	Deceuninck–Quick-Step	
3 October	Gylne Gutuer	Norway	1.2	William Blume Levy (DEN)	Team ColoQuick	
3 October	Piccolo Giro di Lombardia	Italy	1.2U	Paul Lapeira (FRA)	AG2R Citroën Team–U23	
4 October	Coppa Bernocchi	Italy	1.Pro	Remco Evenepoel (BEL)	Deceuninck–Quick-Step	
5 October	Tre Valli Varesine	Italy	1.Pro	Alessandro De Marchi (ITA)	Israel Start-Up Nation	
5 October	Binche–Chimay–Binche	Belgium	1.1	Danny van Poppel (NED)	Intermarché–Wanty–Gobert Matériaux	
6 October	Milano–Torino	Italy	1.Pro	Primož Roglič (SLO)	Team Jumbo–Visma	
7 October	Gran Piemonte	Italy	1.Pro	Matthew Walls (GBR)	Bora–Hansgrohe	
7 October	Paris–Bourges	France	1.1	Jordi Meeus (BEL)	Bora–Hansgrohe	
7–10 October	Circuit des Ardennes International	France	2.2	Lucas Eriksson (SWE)	Riwal Cycling Team	
9 October	Tour de Vendée	France	1.1	Bram Welten (NED)	Arkéa–Samsic	
10 October	Paris–Tours	France	1.Pro	Arnaud Démare (FRA)	Groupama–FDJ	
10 October	Paris–Tours Espoirs	France	1.2U	Jonas Iversby Hvideberg (NOR)	Uno-X Pro Cycling Team	
11 October	Coppa Ugo Agostoni	Italy	1.1	Alexey Lutsenko (KAZ)	Astana–Premier Tech	
13 October	Giro del Veneto	Italy	1.1	Xandro Meurisse (BEL)	Alpecin–Fenix	
16 October	Grand Prix du Morbihan	France	1.Pro	Arne Marit (BEL)	Sport Vlaanderen–Baloise	
16 October	Ster van Zwolle	Netherlands	1.2	Coen Vermeltfoort (NED)	VolkerWessels Cycling Team	
17 October	Chrono des Nations	France	1.1	Stefan Küng (SUI)	Groupama–FDJ	
17 October	Chrono des Nations-U23	France	1.2U	Antoine Devanne (FRA)	Vendée U Pays de la Loire	
17 October	Paris–Mantes-en-Yvelines	France	1.2	Maxime Jarnet (FRA)	VC Villefranche Beaujolais	
17 October	Veneto Classic	Italy	1.1	Samuele Battistella (ITA)	Astana–Premier Tech	
17 October	Boucles de l'Aulne	France	1.1	Stan Dewulf (BEL)	AG2R Citroën Team	
24 October	Ronde van Drenthe	Netherlands	1.1	Rune Herregodts (BEL)	Sport Vlaanderen–Baloise	
