= 2021 Gran Piemonte =

- 2021 UCI Europe Tour; 2021 UCI ProSeries

Race details
- Dates: 7 October 2021
- Stages: 1
- Distance: 168 km (104.4 mi)
- Winning time: 3h 34' 47"

Results
| | Winner | Matthew Walls (GBR) | (Bora–Hansgrohe) |
| | Second | Giacomo Nizzolo (ITA) | (Team Qhubeka NextHash) |
| | Third | Olav Kooij (NED) | (Team Jumbo–Visma) |

The 2021 Gran Piemonte was the 105th edition of the Gran Piemonte road cycling one day race. It was held in the titular region of northwestern Italy on 7 October 2021 as part of the 2021 UCI Europe Tour and the 2021 UCI ProSeries calendars.

After the previous two editions featured hilly routes, the race was expected to favour the sprinters for the first time since 2018. The 168-kilometre (104 mi) race along the southern edge of the Italian Alps started in Rocca Canavese and headed northeast. Among the slightly undulating terrain, there was only one major hill on the course, La Serra, which was 6.5 kilometres (4.0 mi) at an average gradient of 5.2 percent, and crested at 60.5 kilometres (37.6 mi) into the race. The final 68 kilometres (42 mi) featured two long false flat sections. The first false flat section finished at the top of an unmarked hill with around 35 kilometres (22 mi) to go. After a short descent, riders then took on the second false flat section, which led to the finish in Borgosesia.

Matthew Walls (Bora–Hansgrohe) held off Giacomo Nizzolo (Team Qhubeka NextHash) with a bike throw on line to win the race, while Olav Kooij (Team Jumbo–Visma), who had crashed just inside the final 20 kilometres (12 mi), rebounded to finish third. This was the first of two victories within an hour of each other for Bora–Hansgrohe, as Jordi Meeus won his own sprint at Paris–Bourges shortly thereafter.

== Teams ==
13 of the 19 UCI WorldTeams and eight UCI ProTeams made up the 21 teams that participated in the race. With six riders each, Arkéa–Samsic, Astana–Premier Tech, Eolo–Kometa, and Israel Start-Up Nation, were the only teams to not enter a full squad of seven riders. Bora–Hansgrohe, Cofidis, and Intermarché–Wanty–Gobert Matériaux were also reduced to six riders after each team had one non-starter. A total of 140 riders started the race, of which 136 finished.

UCI WorldTeams

- Astana–Premier Tech
- Bora–Hansgrohe
- Cofidis
- Ineos Grenadiers
- Intermarché–Wanty–Gobert Matériaux
- Israel Start-Up Nation
- Lotto–Soudal
- Movistar Team
- Team Bahrain Victorious
- Team Jumbo–Visma
- Team Qhubeka NextHash
- Trek–Segafredo
- UAE Team Emirates

UCI ProTeams

- Androni Giocattoli–Sidermec
- Arkéa–Samsic
- Bardiani–CSF–Faizanè
- Eolo–Kometa
- Euskaltel–Euskadi
- Gazprom–RusVelo
- Rally Cycling
- Vini Zabù

== Result ==
Result
| Rank | Rider | Team | Time |
|---|---|---|---|
| 1 | Matthew Walls (GBR) | Bora–Hansgrohe | 3h 34' 47" |
| 2 | Giacomo Nizzolo (ITA) | Team Qhubeka NextHash | + 0" |
| 3 | Olav Kooij (NED) | Team Jumbo–Visma | + 0" |
| 4 | Matteo Trentin (ITA) | UAE Team Emirates | + 0" |
| 5 | Biniam Girmay (ERI) | Intermarché–Wanty–Gobert Matériaux | + 0" |
| 6 | Jakub Mareczko (ITA) | Vini Zabù | + 0" |
| 7 | Riccardo Minali (ITA) | Intermarché–Wanty–Gobert Matériaux | + 0" |
| 8 | Arvid de Kleijn (NED) | Rally Cycling | + 0" |
| 9 | Amaury Capiot (BEL) | Arkéa–Samsic | + 0" |
| 10 | Stefano Oldani (ITA) | Lotto–Soudal | + 0" |
