= 2021 GP Miguel Induráin =

2021 UCI Europe Tour 2021 UCI ProSeries

Race details
- Dates: 3 April 2021
- Stages: 1
- Distance: 203 km (126 mi)
- Winning time: 5h 10' 47"

Results
	Winner	Alejandro Valverde (ESP)	(Movistar Team)
	Second	Alexey Lutsenko (KAZ)	(Astana–Premier Tech)
	Third	Luis León Sánchez (ESP)	(Astana–Premier Tech)

The 2021 GP Miguel Induráin was the 67th edition of the GP Miguel Induráin road cycling one day race, which was held on 3 April 2021, that started and finished in Estella. The 1.Pro-category race was initially scheduled to be a part of the inaugural edition of the UCI ProSeries, but after the 2020 edition was cancelled due to the COVID-19 pandemic, it made its UCI ProSeries debut in 2021, while also still being a part of the 2021 UCI Europe Tour.

== Teams ==
Nine of the nineteen UCI WorldTeams, eight UCI ProTeams, and two UCI Continental teams made up the nineteen teams that participated in the race. Several teams elected to compete with less than the maximum of seven riders allowed: Electro Hiper Europa, Eolo–Kometa, Rally Cycling, and Team Bahrain Victorious each entered six, while Team BikeExchange entered five, for a total of 127 riders.

UCI WorldTeams

- Astana–Premier Tech
- Cofidis
- INEOS Grenadiers
- Israel Start-Up Nation
- Movistar Team
- Team Bahrain Victorious
- Team BikeExchange
- Trek–Segafredo
- UAE Team Emirates

UCI ProTeams

- Arkéa–Samsic
- Burgos BH
- Caja Rural–Seguros RGA
- Eolo–Kometa
- Equipo Kern Pharma
- Euskaltel–Euskadi
- Rally Cycling
- Total Direct Énergie

UCI Continental Teams

- Efapel
- Electro Hiper Europa

== Result ==
Result
Rank	Rider	Team	Time
1	Alejandro Valverde (ESP)	Movistar Team	5h 10' 47"
2	Alexey Lutsenko (KAZ)	Astana–Premier Tech	+ 6"
3	Luis León Sánchez (ESP)	Astana–Premier Tech	+ 15"
4	Pello Bilbao (ESP)	Team Bahrain Victorious	+ 17"
5	Élie Gesbert (FRA)	Arkéa–Samsic	+ 18"
6	Krists Neilands (LAT)	Israel Start-Up Nation	+ 21"
7	Bauke Mollema (NED)	Trek–Segafredo	+ 21"
8	Jesús Herrada (ESP)	Cofidis	+ 21"
9	Omar Fraile (ESP)	Astana–Premier Tech	+ 21"
10	Laurens De Plus (BEL)	INEOS Grenadiers	+ 30"
