= 2021 Trofeo Laigueglia =

2021 UCI Europe Tour 2021 UCI ProSeries

Race details
- Dates: 3 March 2021
- Stages: 1
- Distance: 202.0 km (125.5 mi)
- Winning time: 4h 57' 05"

Results
	Winner	Bauke Mollema (NED)	(Trek–Segafredo)
	Second	Egan Bernal (COL)	(Ineos Grenadiers)
	Third	Mauri Vansevenant (BEL)	(Deceuninck–Quick-Step)

The 2021 Trofeo Laigueglia was a one-day road cycling race that took place on 2 March 2021 in and around Laigueglia, Liguria, on the northwestern coast of Italy. It was the 58th edition of the Trofeo Laigueglia and was rated as a 1.Pro event as part of the 2021 UCI Europe Tour and the 2021 UCI ProSeries. The race covered 202 kilometres (126 mi) and finished off with four laps of a finishing circuit that was 11 kilometres (6.8 mi) long and featured two short and sharp climbs, the Colla Micheri and the Capo Mele.

== Teams ==
Ten UCI WorldTeams, nine UCI ProTeans, and six UCI Continental teams made up the twenty-five teams that participated in the race. Every team entered seven riders each, except for Arkéa–Samsic and Giotti Victoria–Savini Due, which each entered six riders. However, the remainder of the Giotti Victoria–Savini Due team withdrew after an unnamed rider tested positive for COVID-19 ahead of the race. With Gianni Moscon of Ineos Grenadiers also being a non-starter after sustaining injuries from a crash in Kuurne–Brussels–Kuurne three days prior, there were 166 riders who started the race, of which only 82 finished.

UCI WorldTeams

- AG2R Citroën Team
- Astana–Premier Tech
- Cofidis
- Deceuninck–Quick-Step
- Groupama–FDJ
- Ineos Grenadiers
- Intermarché–Wanty–Gobert Matériaux
- Movistar Team
- Team Bahrain Victorious
- Trek–Segafredo

UCI ProTeams

- Androni Giocattoli–Sidermec
- Arkéa–Samsic
- Bardiani–CSF–Faizanè
- Delko
- Eolo–Kometa
- Euskaltel–Euskadi
- Gazprom–RusVelo
- Team Novo Nordisk
- Vini Zabù

UCI Continental Teams

- Beltrami TSA–Tre Colli
- General Store–Fratelli Curia–Essegibi
- ~~Giotti Victoria–Savini Due~~
- MG.K Vis VPM
- Team Colpack–Ballan
- Work Service–Marchiol–Vega

== Result ==
Result
Rank	Rider	Team	Time
1	Bauke Mollema (NED)	Trek–Segafredo	4h 57' 05"
2	Egan Bernal (COL)	Ineos Grenadiers	+ 39"
3	Mauri Vansevenant (BEL)	Deceuninck–Quick-Step	+ 39"
4	Clément Champoussin (FRA)	AG2R Citroën Team	+ 39"
5	Giulio Ciccone (ITA)	Trek–Segafredo	+ 39"
6	Mikel Landa (ESP)	Team Bahrain Victorious	+ 39"
7	James Knox (GBR)	Deceuninck–Quick-Step	+ 57"
8	Andrea Vendrame (ITA)	AG2R Citroën Team	+ 1' 01"
9	Biniam Girmay (ERI)	Delko	+ 1' 01"
10	Lorenzo Rota (ITA)	Intermarché–Wanty–Gobert Matériaux	+ 1' 01"
