= 2021 Eurométropole Tour =

2021 UCI Europe Tour 2021 UCI ProSeries

Race details
- Dates: 29 September 2021
- Stages: 1
- Distance: 177.6 km (110.4 mi)
- Winning time: 4h 08' 32"

Results
	Winner	Fabio Jakobsen (NED)	(Deceuninck–Quick-Step)
	Second	Jordi Meeus (BEL)	(Bora–Hansgrohe)
	Third	Mads Pedersen (DEN)	(Trek–Segafredo)

The 2021 Eurométropole Tour was the 80th edition of the Eurométropole Tour and the fifth edition since it became a one day race. It was held on 29 September 2021 as part of the 2021 UCI Europe Tour and the 2021 UCI ProSeries calendars. This edition was the race's first in the UCI ProSeries; the 2020 edition was expected to feature in the inaugural UCI ProSeries but was cancelled due to the COVID-19 pandemic. The race was originally scheduled for 2 October, but after Paris–Roubaix was postponed to 3 October, race organisers decided to reschedule the race in order to attract a more competitive field.

The race, which took place in Walloon Belgium near the border with France, featured a hilly route covering 177.6 kilometres (110.4 mi). The first 103.5 kilometres (64.3 mi) of the race saw riders travel west from the start in La Louvière to the finish city of Tournai, traversing one sprint point in Lessines (Souvenir Criquielion) and five short but steep hills. Once the race reached Tournai, riders then completed five laps of a 15 kilometres (9.3 mi) circuit around the city, with each lap featuring an ascent of the Col de la Croix Jubaru. Additionally, each passage through the finish line before the end of the race was a sprint point; in order, these were the Souvenirs Duquennoy, Weylandt, Demoitié, Rossolini, and Dubois. Each of the six souvenirs was named after a deceased figure in cycling. The first four were professional cyclists: Criquielion and Duquennoy died of illness, while Weylandt and Demoitié were fatally injured in separate racing incidents. Rossolini was an announcer at several cycling events, including the Tour de France, while Dubois was a media reporter.

== Teams ==
12 of the 19 UCI WorldTeams, nine UCI ProTeams, and three UCI Continental teams made up the 24 teams that participated in the race. Five teams, all of which were UCI WorldTeams, each entered six riders instead of a full squad of seven riders; these teams were Groupama–FDJ, INEOS Grenadiers, Israel Start-Up Nation, Team Qhubeka NextHash, and UAE Team Emirates. In total, 163 riders started the race, of which 133 finished.

UCI WorldTeams

- Bora–Hansgrohe
- Cofidis
- Deceuninck–Quick-Step
- EF Education–Nippo
- Groupama–FDJ
- INEOS Grenadiers
- Intermarché–Wanty–Gobert Matériaux
- Israel Start-Up Nation
- Lotto–Soudal
- Team Qhubeka NextHash
- Trek–Segafredo
- UAE Team Emirates

UCI ProTeams

- Alpecin–Fenix
- Arkéa–Samsic
- B&B Hotels p/b KTM
- Bingoal Pauwels Sauces WB
- Gazprom–RusVelo
- Rally Cycling
- Sport Vlaanderen–Baloise
- Team TotalEnergies
- Uno-X Pro Cycling Team

UCI Continental Teams

- Black Spoke Pro Cycling
- Tarteletto–Isorex
- Xelliss–Roubaix–Lille Métropole

== Result ==
Result
Rank	Rider	Team	Time
1	Fabio Jakobsen (NED)	Deceuninck–Quick-Step	4h 08' 32"
2	Jordi Meeus (BEL)	Bora–Hansgrohe	+ 0"
3	Mads Pedersen (DEN)	Trek–Segafredo	+ 0"
4	Danny van Poppel (NED)	Intermarché–Wanty–Gobert Matériaux	+ 0"
5	Hugo Hofstetter (FRA)	Israel Start-Up Nation	+ 0"
6	Nacer Bouhanni (FRA)	Arkéa–Samsic	+ 0"
7	Kenneth Van Rooy (BEL)	Sport Vlaanderen–Baloise	+ 0"
8	Luca Mozzato (ITA)	B&B Hotels p/b KTM	+ 0"
9	Reinardt Janse van Rensburg (RSA)	Team Qhubeka NextHash	+ 0"
10	Samuel Leroux (FRA)	Xelliss–Roubaix–Lille Métropole	+ 0"
