= 2021 Clásica de Almería =

2021 UCI Europe Tour 2021 UCI ProSeries

Race details
- Dates: 14 February 2021
- Distance: 183.3 km (113.9 mi)
- Winning time: 4h 18' 44"

Results
	Winner	Giacomo Nizzolo (ITA)	(Team Qhubeka Assos)
	Second	Florian Sénéchal (FRA)	(Deceuninck–Quick-Step)
	Third	Martin Laas (EST)	(Bora–Hansgrohe)

The 2021 Clásica de Almería was the 36th edition of the Clásica de Almería road cycling one day race. It was held on 14 February 2021 as part of the 2021 UCI Europe Tour and the 2021 UCI ProSeries. The 183.3-kilometer race started in Puebla de Vícar and finish in Roquetas de Mar.

German sprinter Pascal Ackermann of Bora–Hansgrohe, who had won the previous two editions of the race, did not return to defend his title and missed the opportunity to go for three wins in a row. In his absence, defending European champion Giacomo Nizzolo of Team Qhubeka Assos won the sprint ahead of Florian Sénéchal of Deceuninck–Quick-Step, with Ackermann's teammate Martin Laas completing the podium.

== Teams ==
Eleven UCI WorldTeams and eleven UCI ProTeams make up the twenty-two teams that participated in the race. Each team entered seven riders, for a total of 154 riders, of which 143 finished.

UCI WorldTeams

- AG2R Citroën Team
- Astana–Premier Tech
- Bora–Hansgrohe
- Cofidis
- Deceuninck–Quick-Step
- Intermarché–Wanty–Gobert Matériaux
- Movistar Team
- Team BikeExchange
- Team Qhubeka Assos
- Trek–Segafredo
- UAE Team Emirates

UCI ProTeams

- Bardiani–CSF–Faizanè
- Bingoal WB
- Burgos BH
- Caja Rural–Seguros RGA
- Eolo–Kometa
- Equipo Kern Pharma
- Euskaltel–Euskadi
- Gazprom–RusVelo
- Rally Cycling
- Sport Vlaanderen–Baloise
- Total Direct Énergie

== Result ==
Result
Rank	Rider	Team	Time
1	Giacomo Nizzolo (ITA)	Team Qhubeka Assos	4h 18' 44"
2	Florian Sénéchal (FRA)	Deceuninck–Quick-Step	+ 0"
3	Martin Laas (EST)	Bora–Hansgrohe	+ 0"
4	Jon Aberasturi (ESP)	Caja Rural–Seguros RGA	+ 0"
5	Danny van Poppel (NED)	Intermarché–Wanty–Gobert Matériaux	+ 0"
6	Timothy Dupont (BEL)	Bingoal WB	+ 0"
7	Gabriel Cullaigh (GBR)	Movistar Team	+ 0"
8	Edward Theuns (BEL)	Trek–Segafredo	+ 0"
9	Marc Sarreau (FRA)	AG2R Citroën Team	+ 0"
10	Damiano Cima (ITA)	Gazprom–RusVelo	+ 0"
