= Rémy Mertz =

Belgian cyclist

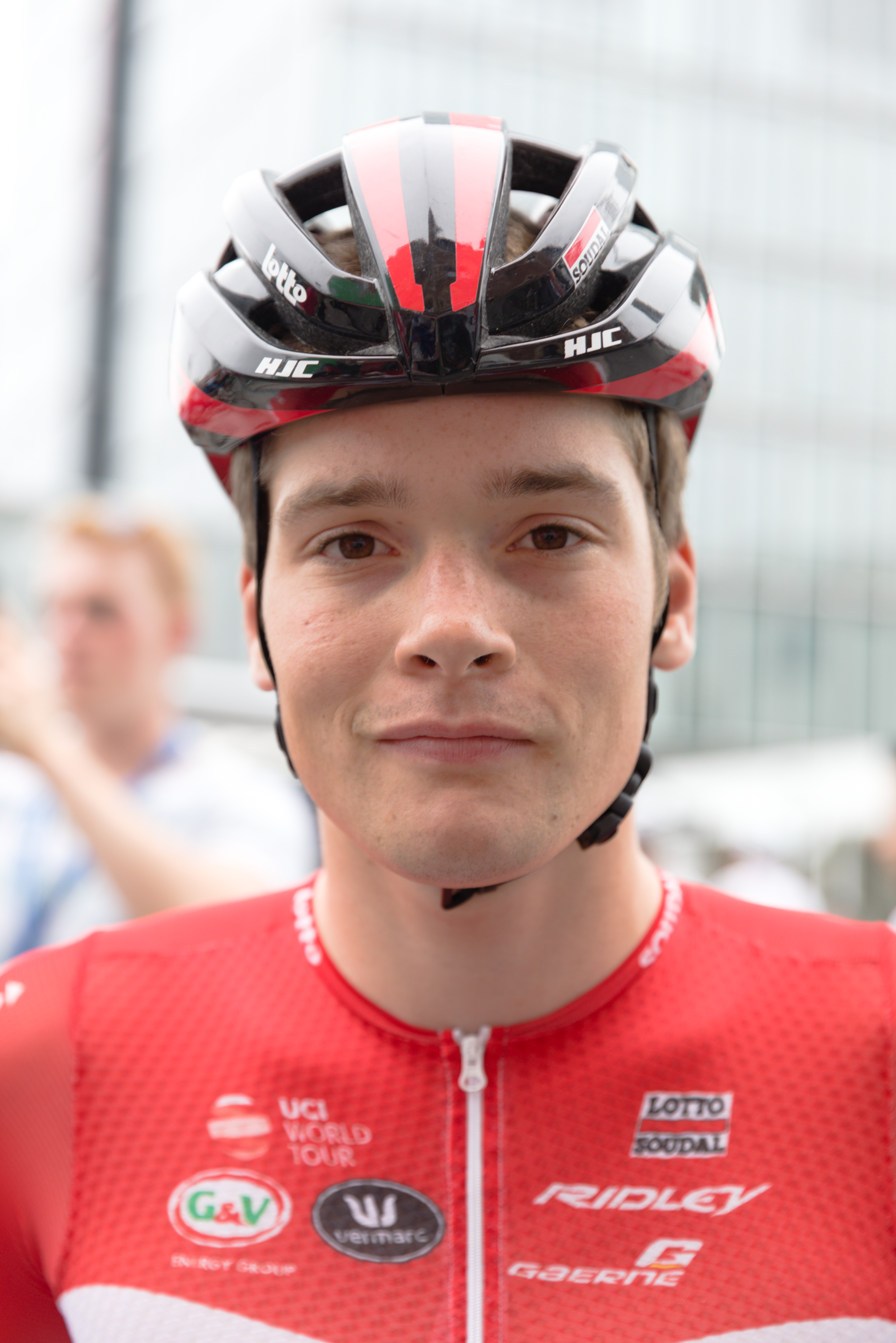
- Mertz at the 2018 Rund um Köln

Personal information
- Full name: Rémy Mertz
- Born: 17 July 1995 (age 31) Luxembourg City, Luxembourg
- Height: 1.75 m (5 ft 9 in)
- Weight: 70 kg (154 lb)

Cycling career
- Sport: Cycling
- Current team: Retired
- Discipline: Road
- Role: Rider

Professional teams
- 2014–2016: Color Code–Biowanze
- 2017–2020: Lotto–Soudal
- 2021–2023: Bingoal WB

Rémy Mertz (born 17 July 1995 in Luxembourg City) is a Belgian former cyclist, who competed as a professional from 2014 to 2023. He was named in the startlist for the 2017 Vuelta a España.

== Major results ==
2014
8th Overall Flèche du Sud
2015
1st Stage 5 Carpathian Couriers Race
2016
5th Coppa dei Laghi-Trofeo Almar
6th Liege–Bastogne–Liege Espoirs
2019
5th Famenne Ardenne Classic
10th Le Samyn
2021
3rd Clássica da Arrábida
7th Overall Volta a la Comunitat Valenciana
8th Tour du Doubs
2022
3rd Per sempre Alfredo
2023
6th Per sempre Alfredo

=== Grand Tour general classification results timeline ===
Grand Tour	2017	2018	2019	2020
Giro d'Italia	—	—	—	—
Tour de France	—	—	—	—
Vuelta a España	150	—	—	104

Legend
—	Did not compete
DNF	Did not finish
