= 2021 GP Industria & Artigianato di Larciano =

- 2021 UCI Europe Tour; 2021 UCI ProSeries

Race details
- Dates: 7 March 2021
- Stages: 1
- Distance: 193.4 km (120.2 mi)
- Winning time: 4h 26' 26"

Results
| | Winner | Mauri Vansevenant (BEL) | (Deceuninck–Quick-Step) |
| | Second | Bauke Mollema (NED) | (Trek–Segafredo) |
| | Third | Mikel Landa (ESP) | (Team Bahrain Victorious) |

The 2021 GP Industria & Artigianato di Larciano (transl. GP Industry & Handicraft of Larciano) was the 52nd edition of the GP Industria & Artigianato di Larciano road cycling one-day race that was held on 7 March 2021. The 1.Pro-category race was initially scheduled to be a part of the inaugural edition of the UCI ProSeries, but after the 2020 edition was cancelled due to the COVID-19 pandemic, it made its UCI ProSeries debut in 2021, while also still being a part of the 2021 UCI Europe Tour.

The 193.4 km (120.2 mi) long race took place in and around Larciano in Tuscany. It covered six laps of a mostly flat 14 km (8.7 mi) loop, followed by almost four laps of a 29.5 km (18.3 mi) loop that features the 8.6 km (5.3 mi) long climb of San Baronto.

== Teams ==
Nine UCI WorldTeams, nine UCI ProTeams, five UCI Continental teams, and one national team made up the twenty-five teams that participated in the race. Each team could enter up to seven riders, though there were several teams who did not: Deceuninck–Quick-Step, Delko, General Store–Fratelli Curia–Essegibi, and MG.K Vis VPM each entered six, while Team Colpack–Ballan entered only five. Of the 169 riders in the race, there were 114 finishers.

UCI WorldTeams

- Astana–Premier Tech
- Bora–Hansgrohe
- Deceuninck–Quick-Step
- Ineos Grenadiers
- Intermarché–Wanty–Gobert Matériaux
- Movistar Team
- Team Bahrain Victorious
- Team BikeExchange
- Trek–Segafredo

UCI ProTeams

- Androni Giocattoli–Sidermec
- Bardiani–CSF–Faizanè
- Caja Rural–Seguros RGA
- Delko
- Eolo–Kometa
- Euskaltel–Euskadi
- Gazprom–RusVelo
- Team Novo Nordisk
- Vini Zabù

UCI Continental Teams

- Beltrami TSA–Tre Colli
- General Store–Fratelli Curia–Essegibi
- MG.K Vis VPM
- Team Colpack–Ballan
- Work Service–Marchiol–Vega

National Teams

- Italy

== Result ==
Result
| Rank | Rider | Team | Time |
|---|---|---|---|
| 1 | Mauri Vansevenant (BEL) | Deceuninck–Quick-Step | 4h 26' 26" |
| 2 | Bauke Mollema (NED) | Trek–Segafredo | + 0" |
| 3 | Mikel Landa (ESP) | Team Bahrain Victorious | + 0" |
| 4 | Nairo Quintana (COL) | Arkéa–Samsic | + 0" |
| 5 | Ide Schelling (NED) | Bora–Hansgrohe | + 3" |
| 6 | Gianluca Brambilla (ITA) | Trek–Segafredo | + 5" |
| 7 | Carlos Rodríguez (ESP) | Ineos Grenadiers | + 11" |
| 8 | Alejandro Valverde (ESP) | Movistar Team | + 16" |
| 9 | Eddie Dunbar (IRL) | Ineos Grenadiers | + 16" |
| 10 | Vincenzo Nibali (ITA) | Trek–Segafredo | + 16" |
