= 2021 Tre Valli Varesine =

- 2021 UCI Europe Tour; 2021 UCI ProSeries

Race details
- Dates: 5 October 2021
- Stages: 1
- Distance: 196.74 km (122.2 mi)
- Winning time: 4h 47' 04"

Results
	Winner	Alessandro De Marchi (ITA)	(Israel Start-Up Nation)
	Second	Davide Formolo (ITA)	(UAE Team Emirates)
	Third	Tadej Pogačar (SLO)	(UAE Team Emirates)

The 2021 Tre Valli Varesine was the 100th edition of the Tre Valli Varesine road cycling one day race, which was held in the Lombardy region of northwestern Italy on 5 October 2021. This edition was the race's first in the UCI ProSeries; the 2020 edition was expected to feature in the inaugural UCI ProSeries but was cancelled due to the COVID-19 pandemic. The race was the second of the 2021 Trittico Lombardo, which also included the Coppa Bernocchi held the day before and the Coppa Ugo Agostoni, to be held six days later.

The 196.74-kilometre (122.25 mi) race began in Busto Arsizio, with the first 46.5 kilometres (28.9 mi) of the race heading north and entering midway through the short circuit in and around Varese. After climbing the Casbeno hill, which crested with just under a kilometre from the finish line, riders passed through the finish line for the first time. Riders then took on eight laps of a 12.93-kilometre (8.03 mi) circuit that was used in the 2008 UCI Road World Championships, with each lap featuring the Montello and Casbeno hills. Following this, the race concluded with two laps of a longer 25.72-kilometre (15.98 mi) circuit that added the Morosolo and Casciago hills in between Montello and Casbeno.

== Teams ==
15 of the 19 UCI WorldTeams, eight UCI ProTeams, and one UCI Continental teams made up the 24 teams that participated in the race. Amore & Vita and Team Qhubeka NextHash, with six riders each, were the only teams to not enter a full squad of seven riders. There were five non-starters from five separate teams (Amore & Vita, Androni Giocattoli–Sidermec, Astana–Premier Tech, Groupama–FDJ, and Israel Start-Up Nation). In total, 161 riders started the race, of which only 41 finished.

UCI WorldTeams

- AG2R Citroën Team
- Astana–Premier Tech
- Bora–Hansgrohe
- Cofidis
- EF Education–Nippo
- Groupama–FDJ
- Ineos Grenadiers
- Intermarché–Wanty–Gobert Matériaux
- Israel Start-Up Nation
- Lotto–Soudal
- Movistar Team
- Team BikeExchange
- Team Qhubeka NextHash
- Trek–Segafredo
- UAE Team Emirates

UCI ProTeams

- Androni Giocattoli–Sidermec
- Arkéa–Samsic
- Bardiani–CSF–Faizanè
- Caja Rural–Seguros RGA
- Eolo–Kometa
- Euskaltel–Euskadi
- Team TotalEnergies
- Vini Zabù

UCI Continental Teams

- Amore & Vita

== Result ==
Result
Rank	Rider	Team	Time
1	Alessandro De Marchi (ITA)	Israel Start-Up Nation	4h 47' 04"
2	Davide Formolo (ITA)	UAE Team Emirates	+ 0"
3	Tadej Pogačar (SLO)	UAE Team Emirates	+ 38"
4	Benoît Cosnefroy (FRA)	AG2R Citroën Team	+ 38"
5	Andreas Kron (DEN)	Lotto–Soudal	+ 38"
6	Sergio Higuita (COL)	EF Education–Nippo	+ 38"
7	Lorenzo Rota (ITA)	Intermarché–Wanty–Gobert Matériaux	+ 38"
8	David Gaudu (FRA)	Groupama–FDJ	+ 38"
9	Alessandro Covi (ITA)	UAE Team Emirates	+ 38"
10	Aurélien Paret-Peintre (FRA)	AG2R Citroën Team	+ 38"
