= 2021 Coppa Bernocchi =

- 2021 UCI Europe Tour; 2021 UCI ProSeries

Race details
- Dates: 4 October 2021
- Stages: 1
- Distance: 197.15 km (122.5 mi)
- Winning time: 4h 26' 13"

Results
	Winner	Remco Evenepoel (BEL)	(Deceuninck–Quick-Step)
	Second	Alessandro Covi (ITA)	(UAE Team Emirates)
	Third	Fausto Masnada (ITA)	(Deceuninck–Quick-Step)

The 2021 Coppa Bernocchi (also known as the Coppa Bernocchi – GP Banco BPM for sponsorship reasons) was the 102nd edition of the Coppa Bernocchi road cycling one day race, which was held in and around Legnano, Italy, on 4 October 2021. This edition was the race's first in the UCI ProSeries; the 2020 edition was expected to feature in the inaugural UCI ProSeries but was cancelled due to the COVID-19 pandemic. The race was the first of the 2021 Trittico Lombardo, which also included the Tre Valli Varesine held the day after and the Coppa Ugo Agostoni, to be held a week later.

The 197.15-kilometre (122.50 mi) race started from the Piazza San Magno in Legnano, with five sprint points in the first 35.5 kilometres (22.1 mi) at San Giorgio su Legnano, Nerviano, San Vittore Olona, Cerro Maggiore, and Busto Arsizio. The first of these came after 1 kilometre (0.62 mi) into the race, while the middle three came within a space of 6 kilometres (3.7 mi), starting at the 13-kilometre (8.1 mi) mark. The course then headed north to take on six laps of an approximately 17-kilometre (11 mi) circuit that featured ascents of San Pancrazio and the Piccolo Stelvio. Following this, the course returned to Legnano and finished with three laps of a 5.8-kilometre (3.6 mi) circuit around the town.

After previous breakaway attempts were reeled back in by the peloton, six riders attacked to form another breakaway just under 60 kilometres (37 mi) into the race. On the laps of the first circuit, the sextet gradually increased their advantage, which initially stabilised at just over four minutes by the 90-kilometre (56 mi) mark, but their advantage continued to increase as they entered the final 50 kilometres (31 mi). With 31 kilometres (19 mi) left, Remco Evenepoel (Deceuninck–Quick-Step) attacked from the lead group. The advantage of the leading six riders was so great that, by the final lap, race organisers forced the peloton to stop and let the sextet pass. Evenepoel continued to increase his lead over the final kilometres and soloed to the victory. With 3.1 kilometres (1.9 mi) left, Alessandro Covi (UAE Team Emirates attacked from the remainder of the breakaway and was immediately chased by Evenepoel's teammate Fausto Masnada; they stayed ahead of the other three, with Covi outsprinting Masnada for second place just under two minutes in arrears. Samuele Battistella (Astana–Premier Tech) and Thibaut Pinot (Groupama–FDJ) finished around 30 seconds later, while stagiaire Antonio Puppio (Team Qhubeka NextHash), the last rider in the breakaway, finished a further thirty seconds later. Just under 11 minutes after Evenepoel had finished, Covi's teammate Juan Sebastián Molano won the sprint for seventh and led in the peloton.

== Teams ==
13 of the 19 UCI WorldTeams, eight UCI ProTeams, and four UCI Continental teams make up the 25 teams that participated in the race. All but five teams entered a full squad of seven riders; these five teams were Amore & Vita, Israel Start-Up Nation, Team BikeExchange, UAE Team Emirates, and Work Service–Marchiol–Vega, and each team entered six riders. Work Service–Marchiol–Vega was further reduced to five riders after a late non-starter. In total, 170 riders started the race, of which 100 finished.

UCI WorldTeams

- Astana–Premier Tech
- Bora–Hansgrohe
- Cofidis
- Deceuninck–Quick-Step
- EF Education–Nippo
- Groupama–FDJ
- Ineos Grenadiers
- Israel Start-Up Nation
- Movistar Team
- Team BikeExchange
- Team Qhubeka NextHash
- Trek–Segafredo
- UAE Team Emirates

UCI ProTeams

- Androni Giocattoli–Sidermec
- Arkéa–Samsic
- Bardiani–CSF–Faizanè
- Caja Rural–Seguros RGA
- Eolo–Kometa
- Euskaltel–Euskadi
- Team TotalEnergies
- Vini Zabù

UCI Continental Teams

- Amore & Vita
- Beltrami TSA–Tre Colli
- Team Colpack–Ballan
- Work Service–Marchiol–Vega

== Result ==
Result
Rank	Rider	Team	Time
1	Remco Evenepoel (BEL)	Deceuninck–Quick-Step	4h 26' 13"
2	Alessandro Covi (ITA)	UAE Team Emirates	+ 1' 49"
3	Fausto Masnada (ITA)	Deceuninck–Quick-Step	+ 1' 50"
4	Samuele Battistella (ITA)	Astana–Premier Tech	+ 2' 25"
5	Thibaut Pinot (FRA)	Groupama–FDJ	+ 2' 26"
6	Antonio Puppio (ITA)	Team Qhubeka NextHash	+ 2' 55"
7	Juan Sebastián Molano (COL)	UAE Team Emirates	+ 10' 57"
8	Filippo Fiorelli (ITA)	Bardiani–CSF–Faizanè	+ 10' 57"
9	Niccolò Bonifazio (ITA)	Team TotalEnergies	+ 10' 57"
10	Elia Viviani (ITA)	Cofidis	+ 10' 57"
