= 2021 La Drôme Classic =

2021 Royal Bernard Drôme Classic
2021 UCI Europe Tour 2021 UCI ProSeries

Race details
- Dates: 28 February 2021
- Stages: 1
- Distance: 179.2 km (111.3 mi)
- Winning time: 4h 23' 18"

Results
	Winner	Andrea Bagioli (ITA)	(Deceuninck–Quick-Step)
	Second	Daryl Impey (RSA)	(Israel Start-Up Nation)
	Third	Mikkel Frølich Honoré (DEN)	(Deceuninck–Quick-Step)

The 2021 Royal Bernard Drôme Classic was the eighth edition of the Royal Bernard Drôme Classic cycle race. It was held on 28 February 2021 as a category 1.Pro race on the 2021 UCI Europe Tour and the 2021 UCI ProSeries. For the first time since 2014, the race did not start and/or finish in Livron-sur-Drôme. Instead, the race started and finished in nearby Eurre and featured five climbs, including a triple ascent of the Mur d'Eurre, the last of which summited with five kilometers left. It formed a pair of races on the same weekend with the 2021 Faun-Ardèche Classic, held on the previous day, with both races being organized by Boucles Drôme Ardèche.

== Teams ==
Eleven of the nineteen UCI WorldTeams, seven UCI ProTeams, and three UCI Continental teams made up the twenty-one teams that participated in the race. All but two teams entered the maximum of seven riders; Intermarché–Wanty–Gobert Matériaux entered six and St. Michel–Auber93 entered five, for a total of 144 riders, almost all of whom contested the previous day's Faun-Ardèche Classic. 125 riders finished.

UCI WorldTeams

- AG2R Citroën Team
- Astana–Premier Tech
- Cofidis
- Deceuninck–Quick-Step
- EF Education–Nippo
- Groupama–FDJ
- Intermarché–Wanty–Gobert Matériaux
- Israel Start-Up Nation
- Team Qhubeka Assos
- Trek–Segafredo
- UAE Team Emirates

UCI ProTeams

- Alpecin–Fenix
- Arkéa–Samsic
- B&B Hotels p/b KTM
- Bingoal WB
- Caja Rural–Seguros RGA
- Delko
- Total Direct Énergie

UCI Continental Teams

- St. Michel–Auber93
- Swiss Racing Academy
- Xelliss–Roubaix–Lille Métropole

== Result ==
Result
Rank	Rider	Team	Time
1	Andrea Bagioli (ITA)	Deceuninck–Quick-Step	4h 23' 18"
2	Daryl Impey (RSA)	Israel Start-Up Nation	+ 11"
3	Mikkel Frølich Honoré (DEN)	Deceuninck–Quick-Step	+ 11"
4	Julien Simon (FRA)	Total Direct Énergie	+ 11"
5	Simon Clarke (AUS)	Team Qhubeka Assos	+ 11"
6	Dorian Godon (FRA)	AG2R Citroën Team	+ 11"
7	Biniam Girmay (ERI)	Delko	+ 11"
8	Cyril Gautier (FRA)	B&B Hotels p/b KTM	+ 11"
9	Warren Barguil (FRA)	Arkéa–Samsic	+ 11"
10	Petr Vakoč (CZE)	Alpecin–Fenix	+ 11"
