= 2021 Münsterland Giro =

- 2021 UCI Europe Tour; 2021 UCI ProSeries

Race details
- Dates: 3 October 2021
- Stages: 1
- Distance: 209 km (129.9 mi)
- Winning time: 4h 11' 53"

Results
	Winner	Mark Cavendish (GBR)	(Deceuninck–Quick-Step)
	Second	Alexis Renard (FRA)	(Israel Start-Up Nation)
	Third	Morten Hulgaard (DEN)	(Uno-X Pro Cycling Team)
	Mountains	Alexander Tarlton (GER)	(Team Lotto–Kern Haus)
	Sprints	Josef Černý (CZE)	(Deceuninck–Quick-Step)

The 2021 Münsterland Giro (known as the Sparkasse Münsterland Giro for sponsorship reasons) was the 15th edition of the Münsterland Giro road cycling one day race, held mostly in the titular region of northwest Germany on 3 October 2021. This edition was the race's first in the UCI ProSeries; the 2020 edition was expected to feature in the inaugural UCI ProSeries but was cancelled due to the COVID-19 pandemic.

The 209-kilometre (130 mi) race started in Enschede, just across the border in the Netherlands. After crossing into Germany, riders take on several hills, consisting of the two ascents each of the Coesfelder Berg and the Daruper Berg and one ascent of the Schöppinger Berg. The first of two sprint points was in Laer after 161 kilometres (100 mi), with a second sprint point 10 kilometres (6.2 mi) later near Altenberge. The last hill of the race, the Vorbergshugel, was 0.7 kilometres (0.43 mi) long with an average gradient of 4.3 percent; it crested with just under 2 kilometres (1.2 mi) from the finish line in Nienberge on the outskirts of Münster.

== Teams ==
Five of the 19 UCI WorldTeams, four UCI ProTeams, seven UCI Continental teams, and the German national team made up the 18 teams that participated in the race. Four teams did not enter a full squad of seven riders: Alpecin–Fenix, Israel Start-Up Nation, and Team SKS Sauerland NRW each entered six riders, while Bike Aid was the only team to enter five riders. In total, 121 riders started the race.

UCI WorldTeams

- Bora–Hansgrohe
- Deceuninck–Quick-Step
- Intermarché–Wanty–Gobert Matériaux
- Israel Start-Up Nation
- Team DSM

UCI ProTeams

- Alpecin–Fenix
- Gazprom–RusVelo
- Sport Vlaanderen–Baloise
- Uno-X Pro Cycling Team

UCI Continental Teams

- Abloc CT
- Bike Aid
- Dauner–Akkon
- Leopard Pro Cycling
- Team Lotto–Kern Haus
- Team SKS Sauerland NRW
- VolkerWessels Cycling Team

National Teams

- Germany

== Result ==
Result
Rank	Rider	Team	Time
1	Mark Cavendish (GBR)	Deceuninck–Quick-Step	4h 11' 53"
2	Alexis Renard (FRA)	Israel Start-Up Nation	+ 1"
3	Morten Hulgaard (DEN)	Uno-X Pro Cycling Team	+ 2"
4	Josef Černý (CZE)	Deceuninck–Quick-Step	+ 6"
5	Niklas Märkl (GER)	Team DSM	+ 9"
6	Rune Herregodts (BEL)	Sport Vlaanderen–Baloise	+ 12"
7	Adriaan Janssen (NED)	Abloc CT	+ 12"
8	Álvaro Hodeg (COL)	Deceuninck–Quick-Step	+ 58"
9	Pascal Ackermann (GER)	Bora–Hansgrohe	+ 1' 21"
10	André Greipel (GER)	Israel Start-Up Nation	+ 1' 33"

Mountains classification
Rank	Rider	Team	Points
1	Alexander Tarlton (GER)	Team Lotto–Kern Haus	11
2	Rune Herregodts (BEL)	Sport Vlaanderen–Baloise	6
3	André Greipel (GER)	Israel Start-Up Nation	3
4	Adriaan Janssen (NED)	Abloc CT	3
5	Mark Cavendish (GBR)	Deceuninck–Quick-Step	2
6	Alexis Renard (FRA)	Israel Start-Up Nation	2
7	Niklas Märkl (GER)	Team DSM	1
8	Martin Urianstad (NOR)	Uno-X Pro Cycling Team	1
9	Philipp Walsleben (GER)	Alpecin–Fenix	1

Sprints classification
Rank	Rider	Team	Points
1	Josef Černý (CZE)	Deceuninck–Quick-Step	6
2	Alexis Renard (FRA)	Israel Start-Up Nation	3
3	Álvaro Hodeg (COL)	Deceuninck–Quick-Step	2
4	Alexander Tarlton (GER)	Team Lotto–Kern Haus	1
