= 2021 Mercan'Tour Classic =

French one-day road cycling race

2021 Mercan'Tour Classic Alpes-Maritimes
2021 UCI Europe Tour

Race details
- Dates: 24 May 2021
- Stages: 1
- Distance: 149.9 km (93.14 mi)
- Winning time: 4h 23' 56"

Results
	Winner	Guillaume Martin (FRA)	(Cofidis)
	Second	Aurélien Paret-Peintre (FRA)	(AG2R Citroën Team)
	Third	Bruno Armirail (FRA)	(Groupama–FDJ)

The 2021 Mercan'Tour Classic Alpes-Maritimes was the inaugural edition of the Mercan'Tour Classic Alpes-Maritimes road cycling one day race, which took place in the titular department in southeastern France on 24 May 2021. It was rated as a category 1.1 race on the 2021 UCI Europe Tour. The 149.9-kilometre (93.1 mi) long race started in Saint-Sauveur-sur-Tinée and finished atop the summit of the Col de Valberg.

The race was won by Guillaume Martin of Cofidis, who soloed away to victory on the final climb and finished 1 minute and 42 seconds ahead of the next two riders, Aurélien Paret-Peintre and Bruno Armirail, with the former winning the sprint for second.

== Teams ==
Four UCI WorldTeams, seven UCI ProTeams, and five UCI Continental teams made up the sixteen teams that participated in the race. Teams could enter up to seven riders each, but many decided not to do so. Five teams (AG2R Citroën Team, Cofidis, EF Education–Nippo, St. Michel–Auber93, and Uno-X Pro Cycling Team) fielded only six riders each, and three other teams (Arkéa–Samsic, B&B Hotels p/b KTM, and Work Service–Marchiol–Vega) fielded only five each, while the remaining eight fielded the maximum number allowed. Of the 100 riders to start the race, only 47 riders finished, with a further three finishing over the time limit.

UCI WorldTeams

- AG2R Citroën Team
- Cofidis
- EF Education–Nippo
- Groupama–FDJ

UCI ProTeams

- Arkéa–Samsic
- B&B Hotels p/b KTM
- Burgos BH
- Delko
- Total Direct Énergie
- Uno-X Pro Cycling Team
- Vini Zabù

UCI Continental Teams

- Amore & Vita
- St. Michel–Auber93
- Team Vorarlberg
- Vino–Astana Motors
- Work Service–Marchiol–Vega

== Result ==
Result
Rank	Rider	Team	Time
1	Guillaume Martin (FRA)	Cofidis	4h 23' 56"
2	Aurélien Paret-Peintre (FRA)	AG2R Citroën Team	+ 1' 42"
3	Bruno Armirail (FRA)	Groupama–FDJ	+ 1' 42"
4	Anthony Perez (FRA)	Cofidis	+ 2' 40"
5	Mathias Frank (SUI)	AG2R Citroën Team	+ 2' 43"
6	Adrià Moreno (ESP)	Team Vorarlberg	+ 2' 53"
7	Jérémy Cabot (FRA)	Total Direct Énergie	+ 2' 56"
8	Roland Thalmann (SUI)	Team Vorarlberg	+ 3' 05"
9	Idar Andersen (NOR)	Uno-X Pro Cycling Team	+ 3' 20"
10	Jaakko Hänninen (FIN)	AG2R Citroën Team	+ 3' 36"
