= 2021 Grand Prix de Fourmies =

2021 UCI Europe Tour 2021 UCI ProSeries

Race details
- Dates: 12 September 2021
- Stages: 1
- Distance: 197.6 km (122.8 mi)
- Winning time: 4h 23' 12"

Results
	Winner	Elia Viviani (ITA)	(Cofidis)
	Second	Pascal Ackermann (GER)	(Bora–Hansgrohe)
	Third	Fernando Gaviria (COL)	(UAE Team Emirates)

The 2021 Grand Prix de Fourmies was the 88th edition of the Grand Prix de Fourmies, a one-day road cycling race in and around Fourmies in northern France. This edition was the race's first in the UCI ProSeries; the 2020 edition was expected to feature in the inaugural UCI ProSeries but was cancelled due to the COVID-19 pandemic. It was also the ninth event of the 2021 French Road Cycling Cup.

== Teams ==
Ten of the nineteen UCI WorldTeams, ten UCI ProTeams, and two UCI Continental teams made up the twenty-two teams that participated in the race. All but four teams fielded a full squad of seven riders; B&B Hotels p/b KTM, Bora–Hansgrohe, Sport Vlaanderen–Baloise, and Trek–Segafredo each entered six riders. In total, 150 riders started the race, of which 134 finished.

UCI WorldTeams

- AG2R Citroën Team
- Bora–Hansgrohe
- Cofidis
- Deceuninck–Quick-Step
- Groupama–FDJ
- Intermarché–Wanty–Gobert Matériaux
- Israel Start-Up Nation
- Lotto–Soudal
- Trek–Segafredo
- UAE Team Emirates

UCI ProTeams

- Alpecin–Fenix
- Arkéa–Samsic
- B&B Hotels p/b KTM
- Bingoal Pauwels Sauces WB
- Delko
- Sport Vlaanderen–Baloise
- Team Novo Nordisk
- Team TotalEnergies
- Uno-X Pro Cycling Team
- Vini Zabù

UCI Continental Teams

- St. Michel–Auber93
- Xelliss–Roubaix–Lille Métropole

== Result ==
Result
Rank	Rider	Team	Time
1	Elia Viviani (ITA)	Cofidis	4h 23' 12"
2	Pascal Ackermann (GER)	Bora–Hansgrohe	+ 0"
3	Fernando Gaviria (COL)	UAE Team Emirates	+ 0"
4	Hugo Hofstetter (FRA)	Israel Start-Up Nation	+ 0"
5	Gerben Thijssen (BEL)	Lotto–Soudal	+ 0"
6	John Degenkolb (GER)	Lotto–Soudal	+ 0"
7	Álvaro Hodeg (COL)	Deceuninck–Quick-Step	+ 0"
8	Jason Tesson (FRA)	St. Michel–Auber93	+ 0"
9	Matis Louvel (FRA)	Arkéa–Samsic	+ 0"
10	Baptiste Planckaert (BEL)	Intermarché–Wanty–Gobert Matériaux	+ 0"
