= 2021 Volta a la Comunitat Valenciana =

2021 UCI Europe Tour 2021 UCI ProSeries

Race details
- Dates: 14–18 April 2021 (Note: The race was originally scheduled for 3 to 7 February, but due to the COVID-19 pandemic, it had to be postponed and rescheduled.)
- Stages: 5
- Distance: 615.7 km (382.6 mi)
- Winning time: 14h 49' 50"

Results
Jersey awarded to the overall winner	Winner	Stefan Küng (SUI)	(Groupama–FDJ)
	Second	Nelson Oliveira (POR)	(Movistar Team)
	Third	Enric Mas (ESP)	(Movistar Team)
Jersey awarded to the points classification winner	Points	Arnaud Démare (FRA)	(Groupama–FDJ)
Jersey awarded to the mountains classification winner	Mountains	Ibon Ruiz (ESP)	(Equipo Kern Pharma)
Jersey awarded to the young rider classification winner	Young rider	Victor Lafay (FRA)	(Cofidis)
	Team	Movistar Team	

The 2021 Volta a la Comunitat Valenciana (English: Tour of the Valencian Community) was a road cycling stage race that took place from 14 to 18 April 2021 in the Spanish autonomous community of Valencia. It was the 72nd edition of the Volta a la Comunitat Valenciana and a 2.Pro event on the 2021 UCI Europe Tour and the 2021 UCI ProSeries calendars.

The race was originally scheduled for 3 to 7 February, but due to a spike in COVID-19 cases in the Valencia area leading up to the race, it had to be postponed to 14 to 18 April.

== Teams ==
Four UCI WorldTeams, eight UCI ProTeams, and three UCI Continental teams make up the fifteen teams that participated in the race. Due to the race's postponement, many of the teams that were initially expected to participate chose not to do so with other race conflicts. As a result, race organizers allowed teams to field up to nine riders instead of the usual maximum of seven for a stage race. Two teams (Lotto–Soudal and Rally Cycling) each entered six riders, five teams (Arkéa–Samsic, Caja Rural–Seguros RGA, Groupama–FDJ, MG.K Vis VPM, and Movistar Team) each entered seven riders, three teams (B&B Hotels p/b KTM, Cofidis, and EvoPro Racing) each entered eight riders, and five teams (Bingoal Pauwels Sauces WB, Burgos BH, Equipo Kern Pharma, Euskaltel–Euskadi, and Tarteletto–Isorex) each entered nine riders. Of the 116 riders who started the race, 107 finished.

UCI WorldTeams

- Cofidis
- Groupama–FDJ
- Lotto–Soudal
- Movistar Team

UCI ProTeams

- Arkéa–Samsic
- B&B Hotels p/b KTM
- Bingoal Pauwels Sauces WB
- Burgos BH
- Caja Rural–Seguros RGA
- Equipo Kern Pharma
- Euskaltel–Euskadi
- Rally Cycling

UCI Continental Teams

- EvoPro Racing
- MG.K Vis VPM
- Tarteletto–Isorex

== Route ==
Stage characteristics and winners
Stage	Date	Course	Distance	Type	Stage winner
1	14 April	Elche to Ondara	159.5 km (99.1 mi)	Hilly stage	Miles Scotson (AUS)
2	15 April	Alicante to Alicante	179 km (111 mi)	Hilly stage	Arnaud Démare (FRA)
3	16 April	Torrent to Dos Aguas (Alto de la Reina)	160.5 km (99.7 mi)	Mountain stage	Enric Mas (ESP)
4	17 April	Xilxes to Almenara	21.2 km (13.2 mi)	Individual time trial	Stefan Küng (SUI)
5	18 April	Paterna to Valencia	95.5 km (59.3 mi)	Flat stage	Arnaud Démare (FRA)
Total			615.7 km (382.6 mi)		

== Stages ==
=== Stage 1 ===
14 April 2021 — Elche to Ondara, 159.5 km (99.1 mi)

Stage 1 Result
Rank	Rider	Team	Time
1	Miles Scotson (AUS)	Groupama–FDJ	4h 14' 57"
2	John Degenkolb (GER)	Lotto–Soudal	+ 28"
3	Alan Riou (FRA)	Arkéa–Samsic	+ 28"
4	Colin Joyce (USA)	Rally Cycling	+ 28"
5	Simone Consonni (ITA)	Cofidis	+ 28"
6	Thibault Ferasse (FRA)	B&B Hotels p/b KTM	+ 28"
7	Stefan Küng (SUI)	Groupama–FDJ	+ 28"
8	Franck Bonnamour (FRA)	B&B Hotels p/b KTM	+ 28"
9	Jonathan Lastra (ESP)	Caja Rural–Seguros RGA	+ 28"
10	Rémy Mertz (BEL)	Bingoal Pauwels Sauces WB	+ 28"

General classification after Stage 1
Rank	Rider	Team	Time
1	Miles Scotson (AUS)	Groupama–FDJ	4h 14' 47"
2	John Degenkolb (GER)	Lotto–Soudal	+ 32"
3	Alan Riou (FRA)	Arkéa–Samsic	+ 34"
4	Enric Mas (ESP)	Movistar Team	+ 35"
5	Nelson Oliveira (POR)	Movistar Team	+ 36"
6	Victor Lafay (FRA)	Cofidis	+ 37"
7	Colin Joyce (USA)	Rally Cycling	+ 38"
8	Simone Consonni (ITA)	Cofidis	+ 38"
9	Thibault Ferasse (FRA)	B&B Hotels p/b KTM	+ 38"
10	Stefan Küng (SUI)	Groupama–FDJ	+ 38"

=== Stage 2 ===
15 April 2021 — Alicante to Alicante, 179 km (111 mi)

Stage 2 Result
Rank	Rider	Team	Time
1	Arnaud Démare (FRA)	Groupama–FDJ	4h 09' 23"
2	Timothy Dupont (BEL)	Bingoal Pauwels Sauces WB	+ 0"
3	Caleb Ewan (AUS)	Lotto–Soudal	+ 0"
4	Simone Consonni (ITA)	Cofidis	+ 0"
5	Sebastián Mora (ESP)	Movistar Team	+ 0"
6	Jacopo Guarnieri (ITA)	Groupama–FDJ	+ 0"
7	Edwin Ávila (COL)	Burgos BH	+ 0"
8	Colin Joyce (USA)	Rally Cycling	+ 0"
9	Felipe Orts (ESP)	Burgos BH	+ 0"
10	Gil D'Heygere (BEL)	Tarteletto–Isorex	+ 0"

General classification after Stage 2
Rank	Rider	Team	Time
1	Miles Scotson (AUS)	Groupama–FDJ	8h 24' 10"
2	John Degenkolb (GER)	Lotto–Soudal	+ 32"
3	Alan Riou (FRA)	Arkéa–Samsic	+ 34"
4	Enric Mas (ESP)	Movistar Team	+ 35"
5	Nelson Oliveira (POR)	Movistar Team	+ 36"
6	Victor Lafay (FRA)	Cofidis	+ 37"
7	Simone Consonni (ITA)	Cofidis	+ 38"
8	Colin Joyce (USA)	Rally Cycling	+ 38"
9	Matis Louvel (FRA)	Arkéa–Samsic	+ 38"
10	Franck Bonnamour (FRA)	B&B Hotels p/b KTM	+ 38"

=== Stage 3 ===
16 April 2021 — Torrent to Dos Aguas (Alto de la Reina), 160.5 km (99.7 mi)

Stage 3 Result
Rank	Rider	Team	Time
1	Enric Mas (ESP)	Movistar Team	4h 11' 47"
2	Victor Lafay (FRA)	Cofidis	+ 2"
3	Élie Gesbert (FRA)	Arkéa–Samsic	+ 8"
4	Luis Ángel Maté (ESP)	Euskaltel–Euskadi	+ 29"
5	Gotzon Martín (ESP)	Euskaltel–Euskadi	+ 31"
6	Rémy Mertz (BEL)	Bingoal Pauwels Sauces WB	+ 31"
7	Nelson Oliveira (POR)	Movistar Team	+ 35"
8	Rémy Rochas (FRA)	Cofidis	+ 38"
9	Stefan Küng (SUI)	Groupama–FDJ	+ 38"
10	Mikel Iturria (ESP)	Euskaltel–Euskadi	+ 1' 33"

General classification after Stage 3
Rank	Rider	Team	Time
1	Enric Mas (ESP)	Movistar Team	12h 36' 22"
2	Victor Lafay (FRA)	Cofidis	+ 8"
3	Élie Gesbert (FRA)	Arkéa–Samsic	+ 17"
4	Luis Ángel Maté (ESP)	Euskaltel–Euskadi	+ 42"
5	Rémy Mertz (BEL)	Bingoal Pauwels Sauces WB	+ 44"
6	Nelson Oliveira (POR)	Movistar Team	+ 46"
7	Stefan Küng (SUI)	Groupama–FDJ	+ 51"
8	Rémy Rochas (FRA)	Cofidis	+ 51"
9	Jonathan Lastra (ESP)	Caja Rural–Seguros RGA	+ 1' 48"
10	Gotzon Martín (ESP)	Euskaltel–Euskadi	+ 1' 55"

=== Stage 4 ===
17 April 2021 — Xilxes to Almenara, 21.2 km (13.2 mi) (ITT)

Stage 4 Result
Rank	Rider	Team	Time
1	Stefan Küng (SUI)	Groupama–FDJ	16' 12"
2	Nelson Oliveira (POR)	Movistar Team	+ 11"
3	Thibault Guernalec (FRA)	Arkéa–Samsic	+ 40"
4	Miles Scotson (AUS)	Groupama–FDJ	+ 41"
5	Arnaud Démare (FRA)	Groupama–FDJ	+ 1' 03"
6	Matis Louvel (FRA)	Arkéa–Samsic	+ 1' 08"
7	Sebastián Mora (ESP)	Movistar Team	+ 1' 09"
8	Alan Riou (FRA)	Arkéa–Samsic	+ 1' 12"
9	Xabier Azparren (ESP)	Euskaltel–Euskadi	+ 1' 13"
7	Diego López (ESP)	Equipo Kern Pharma	+ 1' 14"

General classification after Stage 4
Rank	Rider	Team	Time
1	Stefan Küng (SUI)	Groupama–FDJ	12h 53' 25"
2	Nelson Oliveira (POR)	Movistar Team	+ 6"
3	Enric Mas (ESP)	Movistar Team	+ 36"
4	Victor Lafay (FRA)	Cofidis	+ 45"
5	Élie Gesbert (FRA)	Arkéa–Samsic	+ 1' 01"
6	Luis Ángel Maté (ESP)	Euskaltel–Euskadi	+ 1' 37"
7	Rémy Mertz (BEL)	Bingoal Pauwels Sauces WB	+ 1' 53"
8	Rémy Rochas (FRA)	Cofidis	+ 2' 03"
9	Miles Scotson (AUS)	Groupama–FDJ	+ 2' 26"
10	Matis Louvel (FRA)	Arkéa–Samsic	+ 2' 43"

=== Stage 5 ===
18 April 2021 — Paterna to Valencia, 95.5 km (59.3 mi)

Stage 5 Result
Rank	Rider	Team	Time
1	Arnaud Démare (FRA)	Groupama–FDJ	1h 56' 25"
2	Jon Aberasturi (ESP)	Caja Rural–Seguros RGA	+ 0"
3	Timothy Dupont (BEL)	Bingoal Pauwels Sauces WB	+ 0"
4	Simone Consonni (ITA)	Cofidis	+ 0"
5	Colin Joyce (USA)	Rally Cycling	+ 0"
6	Caleb Ewan (AUS)	Lotto–Soudal	+ 0"
7	Alex Molenaar (NED)	Burgos BH	+ 0"
8	Bram Welten (NED)	Arkéa–Samsic	+ 0"
9	Gerben Thijssen (BEL)	Lotto–Soudal	+ 0"
10	Francesco Di Felice (ITA)	MG.K Vis VPM	+ 0"

General classification after Stage 5
Rank	Rider	Team	Time
1	Stefan Küng (SUI)	Groupama–FDJ	14h 49' 50"
2	Nelson Oliveira (POR)	Movistar Team	+ 6"
3	Enric Mas (ESP)	Movistar Team	+ 36"
4	Victor Lafay (FRA)	Cofidis	+ 45"
5	Élie Gesbert (FRA)	Arkéa–Samsic	+ 1' 01"
6	Luis Ángel Maté (ESP)	Euskaltel–Euskadi	+ 1' 37"
7	Rémy Mertz (BEL)	Bingoal Pauwels Sauces WB	+ 1' 53"
8	Rémy Rochas (FRA)	Cofidis	+ 2' 03"
9	Miles Scotson (AUS)	Groupama–FDJ	+ 2' 26"
10	Matis Louvel (FRA)	Arkéa–Samsic	+ 2' 43"

== Classification leadership table ==
Classification leadership by stage
Stage	Winner	General classification	Points classification	Mountains classification	Young rider classification	Team classification
1	Miles Scotson	Miles Scotson	Miles Scotson	Ibon Ruiz	Alan Riou	Groupama–FDJ
2	Arnaud Démare	Miles Scotson	Simone Consonni	Ibon Ruiz	Alan Riou	Groupama–FDJ
3	Enric Mas	Enric Mas	Enric Mas	Ibon Ruiz	Victor Lafay	Movistar Team
4	Stefan Küng	Stefan Küng	Stefan Küng	Ibon Ruiz	Victor Lafay	Movistar Team
5	Arnaud Démare	Stefan Küng	Arnaud Démare	Ibon Ruiz	Victor Lafay	Movistar Team
Final		Stefan Küng	Arnaud Démare	Ibon Ruiz	Victor Lafay	Movistar Team

- On stage 2, John Degenkolb, who was second in the points classification, wore the orange jersey, because first-placed Miles Scotson wore the yellow jersey as the leader of the general classification. For the same reason, on stage 4, Simone Consonni wore the orange jersey on behalf of Enric Mas, while on stage 5, Miles Scotson did the same on behalf of Stefan Küng.

== Final classification standings ==
Legend
Denotes the winner of the general classification	Denotes the winner of the mountains classification
Denotes the winner of the points classification	Denotes the winner of the young rider classification

=== General classification ===
Final general classification (1–10)
Rank	Rider	Team	Time
1	Stefan Küng (SUI)	Groupama–FDJ	14h 49' 50"
2	Nelson Oliveira (POR)	Movistar Team	+ 6"
3	Enric Mas (ESP)	Movistar Team	+ 36"
4	Victor Lafay (FRA)	Cofidis	+ 45"
5	Élie Gesbert (FRA)	Arkéa–Samsic	+ 1' 01"
6	Luis Ángel Maté (ESP)	Euskaltel–Euskadi	+ 1' 37"
7	Rémy Mertz (BEL)	Bingoal Pauwels Sauces WB	+ 1' 53"
8	Rémy Rochas (FRA)	Cofidis	+ 2' 03"
9	Miles Scotson (AUS)	Groupama–FDJ	+ 2' 26"
10	Matis Louvel (FRA)	Arkéa–Samsic	+ 2' 43"

=== Points classification ===
Final points classification (1–10)
Rank	Rider	Team	Points
1	Arnaud Démare (FRA)	Groupama–FDJ	62
2	Stefan Küng (SUI)	Groupama–FDJ	41
3	Simone Consonni (ITA)	Cofidis	40
4	Miles Scotson (AUS)	Groupama–FDJ	39
5	Timothy Dupont (BEL)	Bingoal Pauwels Sauces WB	36
6	Colin Joyce (USA)	Rally Cycling	34
7	Nelson Oliveira (POR)	Movistar Team	31
8	Enric Mas (ESP)	Movistar Team	30
9	Caleb Ewan (AUS)	Lotto–Soudal	26
10	Alan Riou (FRA)	Arkéa–Samsic	24

=== Mountains classification ===
Final mountains classification (1–10)
Rank	Rider	Team	Points
1	Ibon Ruiz (ESP)	Equipo Kern Pharma	30
2	Enric Mas (ESP)	Movistar Team	12
3	Victor Lafay (FRA)	Cofidis	8
4	Lennert Teugels (BEL)	Tarteletto–Isorex	8
5	Stephen Bassett (USA)	Rally Cycling	6
6	Mikel Iturria (ESP)	Euskaltel–Euskadi	4
7	Thibault Guernalec (FRA)	Arkéa–Samsic	4
8	Ángel Madrazo (ESP)	Burgos BH	4
9	Rémy Rochas (FRA)	Cofidis	3
10	Unai Cuadrado (ESP)	Euskaltel–Euskadi	3

=== Young rider classification ===
Final young rider classification (1–10)
Rank	Rider	Team	Time
1	Victor Lafay (FRA)	Cofidis	14h 50' 35"
2	Rémy Rochas (FRA)	Cofidis	+ 1' 18"
3	Matis Louvel (FRA)	Arkéa–Samsic	+ 1' 58"
4	Diego López (ESP)	Equipo Kern Pharma	+ 2' 02"
5	Savva Novikov (RUS)	Equipo Kern Pharma	+ 2' 13"
6	Abner González (PUR)	Movistar Team	+ 2' 37"
7	Gotzon Martín (ESP)	Euskaltel–Euskadi	+ 2' 45"
8	Juan Diego Alba (COL)	Movistar Team	+ 3' 30"
9	Jefferson Alveiro Cepeda (ECU)	Caja Rural–Seguros RGA	+ 3' 51"
10	Jordí López (ESP)	Equipo Kern Pharma	+ 4' 54"

=== Team classification ===
Final team classification (1–10)
Rank	Team	Time
1	Movistar Team	44h 33' 03"
2	Groupama–FDJ	+ 4' 06"
3	Euskaltel–Euskadi	+ 4' 30"
4	Equipo Kern Pharma	+ 5' 48"
5	Arkéa–Samsic	+ 5' 51"
6	Bingoal Pauwels Sauces WB	+ 8' 58"
7	Cofidis	+ 12' 19"
8	Burgos BH	+ 13' 32"
9	Rally Cycling	+ 23' 14"
10	B&B Hotels p/b KTM	+ 23' 49"
