= 2021 La Roue Tourangelle =

2021 UCI Europe Tour

Race details
- Dates: 4 April 2021
- Stages: 1
- Distance: 204 km (126.8 mi)
- Winning time: 4h 52' 59"

Results
	Winner	Arnaud Démare (FRA)	(Groupama–FDJ)
	Second	Nacer Bouhanni (FRA)	(Arkéa–Samsic)
	Third	Marc Sarreau (FRA)	(AG2R Citroën Team)

The 2021 La Roue Tourangelle Centre Val de Loire - Tropheé Harmonie Mutuelle was the 19th edition of the La Roue Tourangelle road cycling one day race, which was held on 4 April 2021, starting in the town of Sainte-Maure-de-Touraine and finishing in Tours. It was a category-1.1 event on the 2021 UCI Europe Tour and the third event of the 2021 French Road Cycling Cup.

The race was won in a sprint by Arnaud Démare (Groupama–FDJ) ahead of Nacer Bouhanni (Arkéa–Samsic) and Marc Sarreau (AG2R Citroën Team).

== Teams ==
Four UCI WorldTeams, thirteen UCI ProTeams, and five UCI Continental teams made up the twenty-two teams that participated in the race. One team (Intermarché–Wanty–Gobert Matériaux) entered with six riders, two teams (Androni Giocattoli–Sidermec and Team Lotto–Kern Haus) entered with five, and all others entered with seven. 120 of the 149 riders in the race finished.

UCI WorldTeams

- AG2R Citroën Team
- Cofidis
- Groupama–FDJ
- Intermarché–Wanty–Gobert Matériaux

UCI ProTeams

- Androni Giocattoli–Sidermec
- Arkéa–Samsic
- B&B Hotels p/b KTM
- Bingoal Pauwels Sauces WB
- Burgos BH
- Caja Rural–Seguros RGA
- Delko
- Euskaltel–Euskadi
- Gazprom–RusVelo
- Rally Cycling
- Sport Vlaanderen–Baloise
- Total Direct Énergie
- Uno-X Pro Cycling Team

UCI Continental Teams

- St. Michel–Auber93
- Swiss Racing Academy
- Team Lotto–Kern Haus
- Team Vorarlberg
- Xelliss–Roubaix–Lille Métropole

== Result ==
Result
Rank	Rider	Team	Time
1	Arnaud Démare (FRA)	Groupama–FDJ	4h 52' 59"
2	Nacer Bouhanni (FRA)	Arkéa–Samsic	+ 0"
3	Marc Sarreau (FRA)	AG2R Citroën Team	+ 0"
4	Bram Welten (NED)	Arkéa–Samsic	+ 0"
5	Simone Consonni (ITA)	Cofidis	+ 0"
6	Biniam Girmay (ERI)	Delko	+ 0"
7	Andrea Pasqualon (ITA)	Intermarché–Wanty–Gobert Matériaux	+ 0"
8	Luca Mozzato (ITA)	B&B Hotels p/b KTM	+ 0"
9	Milan Menten (BEL)	Bingoal Pauwels Sauces WB	+ 0"
10	Lorrenzo Manzin (FRA)	Total Direct Énergie	+ 0"
