= Victor Lafay =

French cyclist

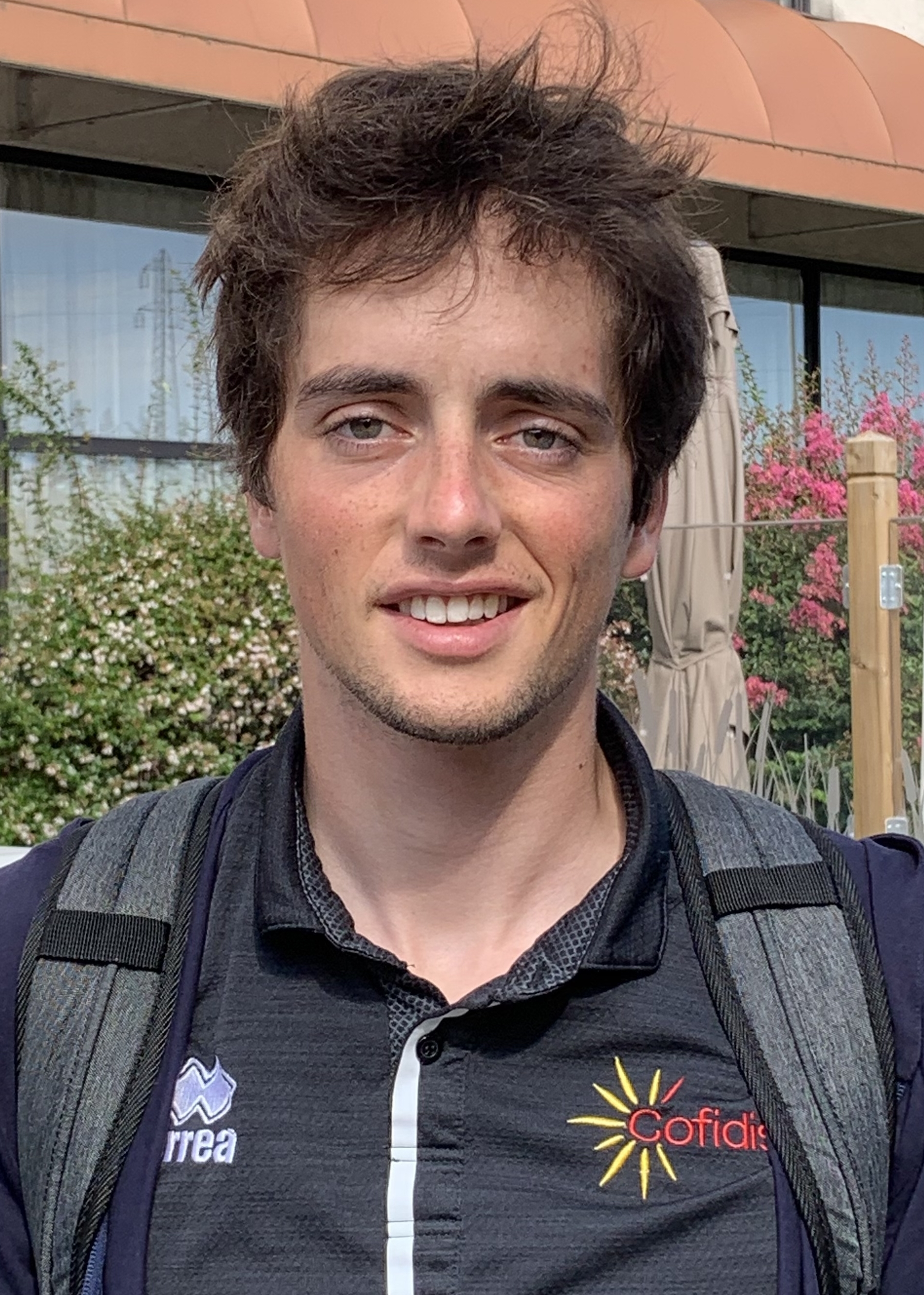
- Victor Lafay in 2021

Personal information
- Full name: Victor Lafay
- Born: 17 January 1996 (age 30) Lyon, France
- Height: 1.77 m (5 ft 10 in)
- Weight: 65 kg (143 lb)

Cycling career
- Sport: Cycling
- Current team: Unibet Rose Rockets
- Discipline: Road
- Role: Rider
- Rider type: Puncheur

Amateur teams
- 2015–2016: Chambéry CF
- 2017–2018: Bourg-en-Bresse Ain

Professional teams
- 2017: Cofidis (stagiaire)
- 2018–2023: Cofidis
- 2024–2025: Decathlon–AG2R La Mondiale
- 2026–: Unibet Rose Rockets

Major wins
- Grand Tours Tour de France 1 individual stage (2023) Giro d'Italia 1 individual stage (2021)
Medal record
Representing France
Men's road bicycle racing
European Championships
Silver medal – second place	2018 Brno	Under-23 road race

Victor Lafay (born 17 January 1996) is a French cyclist who currently rides for UCI ProTeam Unibet Rose Rockets.

== Career ==
In October 2020, he was named in the startlist for the 2020 Vuelta a España.

He won stage 8 of the 2021 Giro d'Italia, from Foggia to Guardia Sanframondi on 15 May 2021, from a breakaway of nine riders.

On 2 July 2023, Lafay won from an elite bunch on stage 2 of the 2023 Tour de France in San Sebastián, attacking in the final kilometre and holding off Wout Van Aert, Tadej Pogacar and Tom Pidcock. On 5 November 2025, Lafay was announced as a new rider on Unibet Tietema Rockets. Prior to this announcement there Lafay had publicly admitted that he had considered retirement.

== Major results ==
2014
1st Overall Tour du Valromey

1st Stages 2 & 3

2017
1st Road race, National Under-23 Road Championships
7th Overall Grand Prix Priessnitz spa
9th Overall Rhône-Alpes Isère Tour
9th Overall Tour de Savoie Mont Blanc
2018
1st Stage 2 Tour de Savoie Mont Blanc
2nd Road race, UEC European Under-23 Road Championships
2021 (1 pro win)
1st Stage 8 Giro d'Italia
3rd Overall Arctic Race of Norway

1st Young rider classification

4th Overall Volta a la Comunitat Valenciana

1st Young rider classification

2022 (1)
2nd Classic Grand Besançon Doubs
5th Overall Arctic Race of Norway

1st Stage 3

6th Trofeo Laigueglia
2023 (2)
1st Classic Grand Besançon Doubs
Tour de France

1st Stage 2
Held after Stages 2–3

3rd Coppa Agostoni
4th Ardèche Classic
6th La Flèche Wallonne
7th Overall Route d'Occitanie
7th Tour du Jura
2024
4th Overall Tour of Guangxi
7th Overall Tour de l'Ain
2025
2nd Overall Tour of Guangxi
3rd Classic Var

=== Grand Tour general classification results timeline ===
Grand Tour	2020	2021	2022	2023
Giro d'Italia	—	DNF	—	—
Tour de France	—	—	DNF	DNF
Vuelta a España	81	—	—	

Legend
—	Did not compete
DNF	Did not finish
