= 2021 Ardèche Classic =

2021 Faun-Ardèche Classic
2021 UCI Europe Tour 2021 UCI ProSeries

Race details
- Dates: 27 February 2021
- Stages: 1
- Distance: 171.3 km (106.4 mi)
- Winning time: 4h 32' 37"

Results
	Winner	David Gaudu (FRA)	(Groupama–FDJ)
	Second	Clément Champoussin (FRA)	(AG2R Citroën Team)
	Third	Hugh Carthy (GBR)	(EF Education–Nippo)

The 2021 Faun-Ardèche Classic was the 21st edition of the Faun-Ardèche Classic cycle race. The category 1.Pro race was held on 27 February 2021 as a part of the 2021 UCI Europe Tour and the 2021 UCI ProSeries. The race started and finished in Guilherand-Granges, and featured five climbs, including a triple ascent of the short but steep Côte du Val d'Enfer, the last of which was in the final ten kilometers. It formed a pair of races on the same weekend with the 2021 Royal Bernard Drôme Classic, held on the following day, with both races being organized by Boucles Drôme Ardèche.

== Teams ==
Eleven of the nineteen UCI WorldTeams, seven UCI ProTeams, and three UCI Continental teams made up the twenty-one teams that participated in the race. All but two teams entered the maximum of seven riders; Intermarché–Wanty–Gobert Matériaux entered six and St. Michel–Auber93 entered five, for a total of 144 riders, of which 122 finished. Many of these riders also contested the Royal Bernard Drôme Classic the following day.

UCI WorldTeams

- AG2R Citroën Team
- Astana–Premier Tech
- Cofidis
- Deceuninck–Quick-Step
- EF Education–Nippo
- Groupama–FDJ
- Intermarché–Wanty–Gobert Matériaux
- Israel Start-Up Nation
- Team Qhubeka Assos
- Trek–Segafredo
- UAE Team Emirates

UCI ProTeams

- Alpecin–Fenix
- Arkéa–Samsic
- B&B Hotels p/b KTM
- Bingoal WB
- Caja Rural–Seguros RGA
- Delko
- Total Direct Énergie

UCI Continental Teams

- St. Michel–Auber93
- Swiss Racing Academy
- Xelliss–Roubaix–Lille Métropole

== Result ==
Result
Rank	Rider	Team	Time
1	David Gaudu (FRA)	Groupama–FDJ	4h 32' 37"
2	Clément Champoussin (FRA)	AG2R Citroën Team	+ 0"
3	Hugh Carthy (GBR)	EF Education–Nippo	+ 11"
4	Mikkel Frølich Honoré (DEN)	Deceuninck–Quick-Step	+ 28"
5	Dorian Godon (FRA)	AG2R Citroën Team	+ 40"
6	Aleksandr Vlasov (RUS)	Astana–Premier Tech	+ 40"
7	Aurélien Paret-Peintre (FRA)	AG2R Citroën Team	+ 42"
8	Thibaut Pinot (FRA)	Groupama–FDJ	+ 42"
9	Jonathan Hivert (FRA)	B&B Hotels p/b KTM	+ 46"
10	Quinn Simmons (USA)	Trek–Segafredo	+ 46"
