= 2021 Cholet-Pays de la Loire =

2021 UCI Europe Tour

Race details
- Dates: 28 March 2021
- Stages: 1
- Distance: 201.8 km (125.4 mi)
- Winning time: 4h 43' 35"

Results
| | Winner | Elia Viviani (ITA) | (Cofidis) |
| | Second | Jon Aberasturi (ESP) | (Caja Rural–Seguros RGA) |
| | Third | Pierre Barbier (FRA) | (Delko) |

The 2021 Cholet-Pays de la Loire was the 43rd edition of the Cholet-Pays de la Loire road cycling one day race, which was held on 28 March 2021, starting and finishing in the French town of Cholet, in the Maine-et-Loire department. The route covers 201.8 kilometres (125.4 mi) and finishes off with seven laps of an 8 kilometres (5.0 mi) long circuit within Cholet. The race was a 1.1-rated event on the 2021 UCI Europe Tour and the second event of the 2021 French Road Cycling Cup.

The race was won in a sprint finish by Elia Viviani (Cofidis) ahead of Jon Aberasturi (Caja Rural–Seguros RGA) and Pierre Barbier (Delko). Initially, Nacer Bouhanni (Arkéa–Samsic) finished third in the race, but he was first relegated and then disqualified following a dangerous sprint, during which he pushed Jake Stewart (Groupama–FDJ) into the barriers, breaking Stewart's hand.

== Teams ==
Four UCI WorldTeams, eleven UCI ProTeams, and six UCI Continental teams made up the twenty-one teams that participated in the race. Four teams (Arkéa–Samsic, Bingoal Pauwels Sauces WB, Intermarché–Wanty–Gobert Matériaux, and Sport Vlaanderen–Baloise) entered with seven riders, while all other teams entered with eight riders each. 143 of the 164 riders in the race finished.

UCI WorldTeams

- AG2R Citroën Team
- Cofidis
- Groupama–FDJ
- Intermarché–Wanty–Gobert Matériaux

UCI ProTeams

- Androni Giocattoli–Sidermec
- Arkéa–Samsic
- B&B Hotels p/b KTM
- Bingoal Pauwels Sauces WB
- Burgos BH
- Caja Rural–Seguros RGA
- Delko
- Rally Cycling
- Sport Vlaanderen–Baloise
- Total Direct Énergie
- Uno-X Pro Cycling Team

UCI Continental Teams

- Canyon dhb SunGod
- Development Team DSM
- Riwal Cycling Team
- St. Michel–Auber93
- Swiss Racing Academy
- Xelliss–Roubaix–Lille Métropole

== Results ==
Result
| Rank | Rider | Team | Time |
|---|---|---|---|
| 1 | Elia Viviani (ITA) | Cofidis | 4h 43' 35" |
| 2 | Jon Aberasturi (ESP) | Caja Rural–Seguros RGA | + 0" |
| 3 | Pierre Barbier (FRA) | Delko | + 0" |
| 4 | Dorian Godon (FRA) | AG2R Citroën Team | + 0" |
| 5 | Marc Sarreau (FRA) | AG2R Citroën Team | + 0" |
| 6 | Alex Vogel (SUI) | Swiss Racing Academy | + 0" |
| 7 | Matthew Bostock (GBR) | Canyon dhb SunGod | + 0" |
| 8 | Thomas Boudat (FRA) | Arkéa–Samsic | + 0" |
| 9 | Romain Cardis (FRA) | St. Michel–Auber93 | + 0" |
| 10 | Matteo Malucelli (ITA) | Androni Giocattoli–Sidermec | + 0" |
