= Matis Louvel =

French racing cyclist (born 1999)

Matîs Louvel
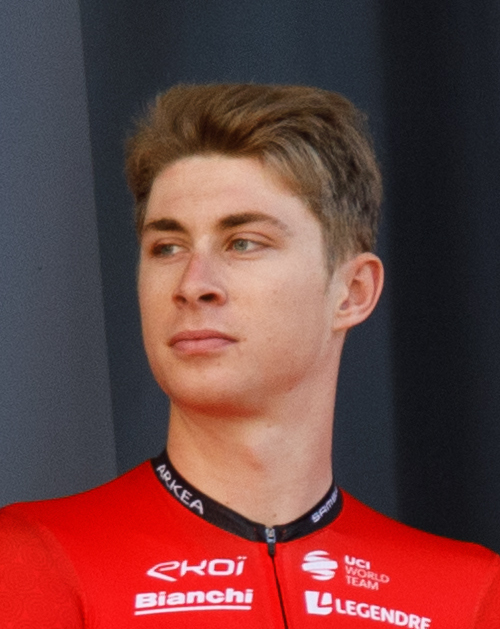
- Louvel at the 2023 Paris-Nice

Personal information
- Born: 19 July 1999 (age 27) Mont-Saint-Aignan, Normandy, France
- Height: 1.87 m (6 ft 2 in)
- Weight: 73 kg (161 lb)

Cycling career
- Sport: Cycling
- Current team: NSN Cycling Team
- Disciplines: Road; Track
- Role: Rider

Amateur teams
- 2016: CC Nogent-sur-Oise Junior
- 2017: VC Rouen 76 Junior
- 2018–2019: VC Rouen 76
- 2019: Groupama–FDJ (stagiaire)

Professional teams
- 2020–2024: Arkéa–Samsic
- 2025–: Israel–Premier Tech

Matîs Louvel (born 19 July 1999 at Mont-Saint-Aignan) is a French cyclist, who currently rides for UCI WorldTeam NSN Cycling Team.

== Major results ==
2018
3rd Overall Valromey Tour

1st Stage 4

9th La Route des Géants
2019
1st Stage 4 Ronde de l'Isard
1st Stage 1 (TTT) Orlen Nations Grand Prix
3rd Road race, National Under-23 Road Championships
2020
9th Prueba Villafranca de Ordizia
2021 (1 pro win)
1st Vuelta a Castilla y León
8th Classic Grand Besançon Doubs
9th Grand Prix de Fourmies
10th Overall Volta a la Comunitat Valenciana
2022 (1)
1st Druivenkoers Overijse
3rd Vuelta a Murcia
3rd Classic Loire Atlantique
3rd Tour du Doubs
5th Trofeo Alcúdia–Port d'Alcúdia
6th Paris–Camembert
6th Tro-Bro Léon
8th Paris–Tours
10th Paris–Chauny
2023
7th Brussels Cycling Classic
8th Giro del Veneto
2024
2nd Druivenkoers Overijse
9th Polynormande
2025
9th Hamburg Cyclassics

=== Grand Tour general classification results timeline ===
Grand Tour	2022	2023	2024	2025	2026
Giro d'Italia	—	—	—	—	—
Tour de France	74	65	—	100	157
Vuelta a España	—	—	—	—	

Legend
—	Did not compete
DNF	Did not finish
