= 2021 UCI ProSeries =

International road cycling contest

- Second edition of the UCI ProSeries

Details
- Location: Asia, Europe, United States
- Races: 47

The 2021 UCI ProSeries is the second season of the UCI ProSeries, the second tier road cycling tour, below the UCI World Tour, but above the various regional UCI Continental Circuits.

The 2021 season initially consisted of 55 events of which 28 were one-day races (1.Pro) and 27 were stage races (2.Pro). There were 47 events in Europe, 5 in Asia, 2 in the United States and 1 in Argentina.

During January 2021, five races were cancelled and three were postponed, leaving 47 races in the 2021 UCI ProSeries season. Two races were added to the calendar (the Dwars door het Hageland and Eurométropole Tour), bringing the number of races scheduled to 49 in early February.

== Events ==
Races in the 2021 UCI ProSeries
Race	Date	Winner	Team	Ref.
(Argentina) Vuelta a San Juan	24–31 January	Cancelled		
(Malaysia) Tour de Langkawi	30 January – 6 February	Cancelled		
Tour of Oman	9–14 February	Cancelled		
(France) Tour de la Provence	11–14 February	Iván Sosa (COL)	INEOS Grenadiers	
(Spain) Clásica de Almería	14 February	Giacomo Nizzolo (ITA)	Team Qhubeka Assos	
(France) Faun-Ardèche Classic	27 February	David Gaudu (FRA)	Groupama–FDJ	
(France) Royal Bernard Drôme Classic	28 February	Andrea Bagioli (ITA)	Deceuninck–Quick-Step	
(Belgium) Kuurne–Brussels–Kuurne	28 February	Mads Pedersen (DEN)	Trek–Segafredo	
(Italy) Trofeo Laigueglia	3 March	Bauke Mollema (NED)	Trek–Segafredo	
(Italy) GP Industria & Artigianato	7 March	Mauri Vansevenant (BEL)	Deceuninck–Quick-Step	
(Belgium) Nokere Koerse	17 March	Ludovic Robeet (BEL)	Bingoal WB	
(Belgium) Bredene Koksijde Classic	19 March	Tim Merlier (BEL)	Alpecin–Fenix	
(Spain) GP Miguel Induráin	3 April	Alejandro Valverde (ESP)	Movistar Team	
(Belgium) Scheldeprijs	7 April	Jasper Philipsen (BEL)	Alpecin–Fenix	
Presidential Tour of Turkey	11–18 April	José Manuel Díaz (ESP)	Delko	
(Belgium) Brabantse Pijl	14 April	Tom Pidcock (GBR)	INEOS Grenadiers	
(Spain) Volta a la Comunitat Valenciana	14–18 April (Note: The Volta a la Comunitat Valenciana was originally scheduled for 3–7 February but was postponed due to the COVID-19 pandemic.)	Stefan Küng (SUI)	Groupama–FDJ	
(Italy) Tour of the Alps	19–23 April	Simon Yates (GBR)	Team BikeExchange	
(United Kingdom) Tour de Yorkshire	29 April – 2 May	Cancelled		
(France) Four Days of Dunkirk	4–9 May	Cancelled		
(Portugal) Volta ao Algarve	5–9 May (Note: The Volta ao Algarve was originally scheduled for 17–21 February but was postponed due to the COVID-19 pandemic.)	João Rodrigues (POR)	W52 / FC Porto	
(France) Tro-Bro Léon	16 May	Connor Swift (GBR)	Arkéa–Samsic	
(Spain) Vuelta a Andalucía	18–22 May (Note: The Vuelta a Andalucía was originally scheduled for 17–21 February but was postponed due to the COVID-19 pandemic.)	Miguel Ángel López (COL)	Movistar Team	
(France) Boucles de la Mayenne	27–30 May	Arnaud Démare (FRA)	Groupama–FDJ	
(Belgium) Dwars door het Hageland	5 June	Rasmus Tiller (NOR)	Uno-X Pro Cycling Team	
Tour of Belgium	9–13 June	Remco Evenepoel (BEL)	Deceuninck–Quick-Step	
Tour of Slovenia	9–13 June	Tadej Pogačar (SLO)	UAE Team Emirates	
(Netherlands) ZLM Tour	9–13 June	Cancelled		
(Belgium) Tour de Wallonie	20–24 July	Quinn Simmons (USA)	Trek–Segafredo	
(United States) Tour of Utah	26 July – 1 August	Cancelled		
(Spain) Vuelta a Burgos	3–7 August	Mikel Landa (ESP)	Team Bahrain Victorious	
Arctic Race of Norway	5–8 August	Ben Hermans (BEL)	Israel Start-Up Nation	
(Denmark) Danmark Rundt	10–14 August	Remco Evenepoel (BEL)	Deceuninck–Quick-Step	
Tour of Norway	19–22 August (Note: The Tour of Norway was originally supposed to begin on 19 May but was reduced by two days. In April, the race was postponed from 21–24 May to 19–22 August.)	Ethan Hayter (GBR)	INEOS Grenadiers	
(Germany) Deutschland Tour	26–29 August	Nils Politt (GER)	Bora–Hansgrohe	
(Belgium) Brussels Cycling Classic	28 August	Remco Evenepoel (BEL)	Deceuninck–Quick-Step	
Tour of Austria	31 August – 4 September (Note: The 2021 Tour of Austria was scheduled for 26 June – 1 July, but was postponed due to the COVID-19 pandemic in Austria. Subsequently the race was cancelled due to financial reasons.)	Cancelled		
(United States) Maryland Cycling Classic	5 September	Cancelled		
(United Kingdom) Tour of Britain	5–12 September	Wout van Aert (BEL)	Team Jumbo–Visma	
(France) Grand Prix de Fourmies	12 September	Elia Viviani (ITA)	Cofidis	
Tour de Luxembourg	14–18 September	João Almeida (POR)	Deceuninck–Quick-Step	
(Belgium) Grand Prix de Wallonie	15 September	Christophe Laporte (FRA)	Cofidis	
(Italy) Coppa Sabatini	16 September	Michael Valgren (DEN)	EF Education–Nippo	
(Belgium) Primus Classic	18 September	Florian Sénéchal (FRA)	Deceuninck–Quick-Step	
(France) Grand Prix de Denain	21 September (Note: The Grand Prix de Denain was originally scheduled for 18 March but was postponed due to the COVID-19 pandemic.)	Jasper Philipsen (BEL)	Alpecin–Fenix	
(Belgium) Eurométropole Tour	29 September (Note: The Eurométropole Tour was originally scheduled for 2 October but was rescheduled to avoid conflict with Paris–Roubaix, which was postponed to 3 October.)	Fabio Jakobsen (NED)	Deceuninck–Quick-Step	
(Italy) Giro dell'Emilia	2 October	Primož Roglič (SLO)	Team Jumbo–Visma	
(Germany) Münsterland Giro	3 October	Mark Cavendish (GBR)	Deceuninck–Quick-Step	
(Italy) Coppa Bernocchi	4 October	Remco Evenepoel (BEL)	Deceuninck–Quick-Step	
(Italy) Tre Valli Varesine	5 October	Alessandro De Marchi (ITA)	Israel Start-Up Nation	
(Italy) Milano–Torino	6 October	Primož Roglič (SLO)	Team Jumbo–Visma	
(Italy) Gran Piemonte	7 October	Matt Walls (GBR)	Bora–Hansgrohe	
(China) Tour of Taihu Lake	9–12 October	Cancelled		
(France) Paris–Tours	10 October	Arnaud Démare (FRA)	Groupama–FDJ	
(France) Grand Prix du Morbihan	16 October (Note: The Grand Prix du Morbihan was originally scheduled for 15 May but was postponed due to the COVID-19 pandemic.)	Arne Marit (BEL)	Sport Vlaanderen–Baloise	
Japan Cup	17 October	Cancelled		
