= Alan Riou =

French racing cyclist

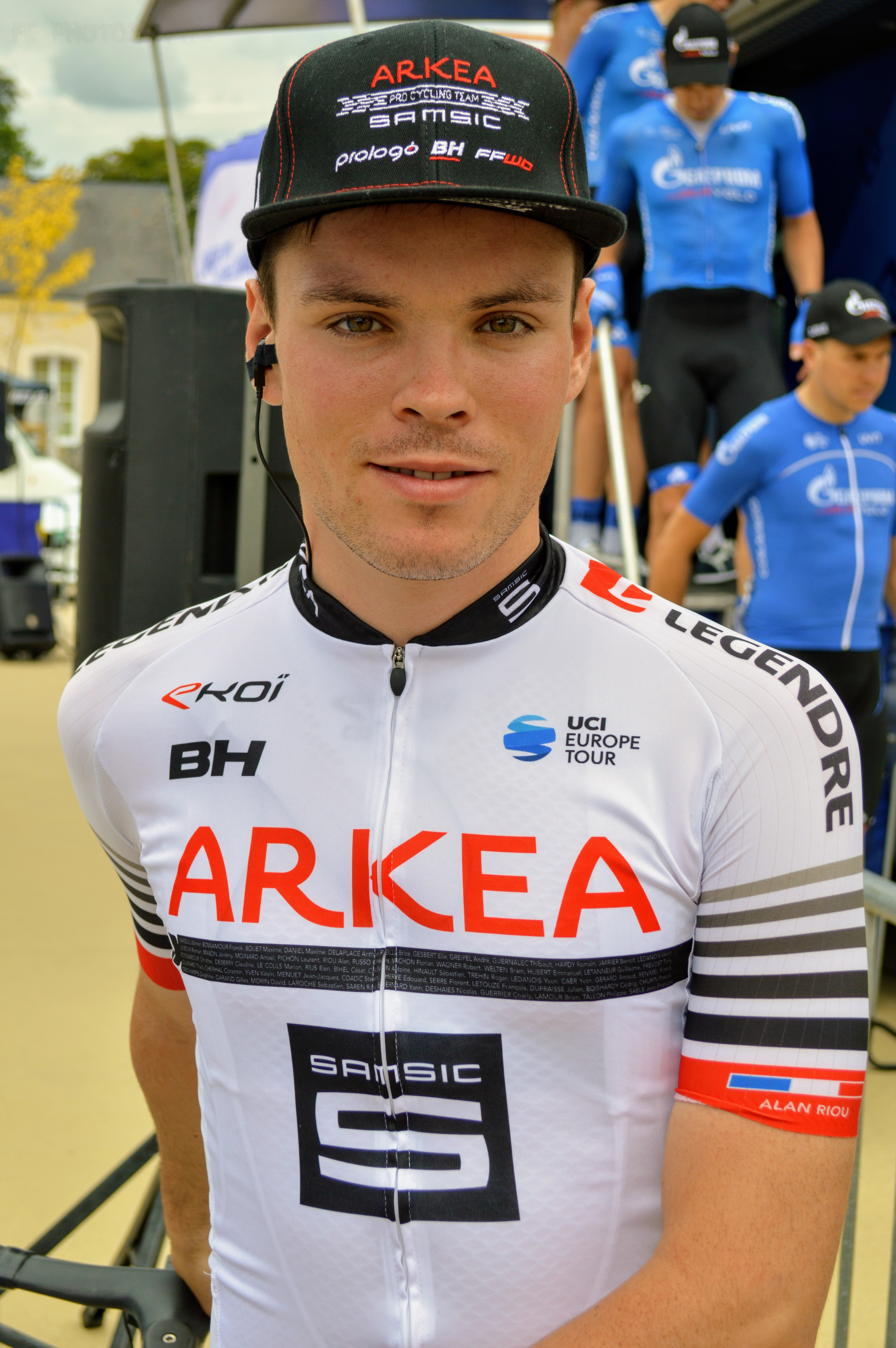
- Riou in 2019

Personal information
- Born: 2 April 1997 (age 29) Lannion, France
- Height: 1.76 m (5 ft 9 in)
- Weight: 68 kg (150 lb)

Cycling career
- Sport: Cycling
- Current team: St. Michel–Preference Home–Auber93
- Discipline: Road
- Role: Rider

Amateur teams
- 2010–2015: Côte de Granit Rose
- 2016–2018: Pays de Dinan

Professional teams
- 2017: Fortuneo–Oscaro (stagiaire)
- 2019–2024: Arkéa–Samsic
- 2025–: St. Michel–Preference Home–Auber93

Alan Riou (born 2 April 1997) is a French cyclist, who currently rides for UCI Continental team St. Michel–Preference Home–Auber93.

== Major results ==
2014
5th Overall Ronde des Vallées
2015
3rd Kuurne–Brussels–Kuurne Juniors
4th Overall Ronde des Vallées
7th Overall Aubel–Thimister–La Gleize
2017
3rd Grand Prix d'Isbergues
6th Grand Prix de la Ville de Nogent-sur-Oise
7th Paris–Chauny
2018
1st Stage 2 Tour de l'Avenir
2021
1st Classic Loire Atlantique
2nd Paris-Troyes

=== Grand Tour general classification results timeline ===
Grand Tour	2023	2024
Giro d'Italia	116	142
Tour de France	—	—
Vuelta a España	—	—

Legend
—	Did not compete
DNF	Did not finish
