= 2025 Soudal–Quick-Step season =

Soudal–Quick-Step
- 2025 season
- UCI code: SOQ
- Status: UCI WorldTeam
- Manager: Jurgen Foré (BEL)
- Main sponsor(s): Soudal; Quick-Step Flooring
- Based: Belgium
- Bicycles: Specialized
- Groupset: Shimano

Season victories
- One-day races: 6
- Stage race stages: 22
- National Championships: 3
- Most wins: Tim Merlier (BEL) (12)

The 2025 season for the Soudal–Quick-Step is the 23rd season in the team's existence. The team has been a UCI WorldTeam since 2005, when the tier was first established.

== Team roster ==
As of 4 January 2025.

Rider	Date of birth
Ayco Bastiaens (BEL)	3 June 1996 (aged 28)
Mattia Cattaneo (ITA)	25 October 1990 (aged 34)
Josef Černý (CZE)	11 May 1993 (aged 31)
Pascal Eenkhoorn (NED)	8 February 1997 (aged 27)
Remco Evenepoel (BEL)	25 January 2000 (aged 24)
Gianmarco Garofoli (ITA)	6 October 2002 (aged 22)
Gil Gelders (BEL)	16 December 2002 (age 22)
Ethan Hayter (GBR)	18 September 1998 (aged 26)
Antoine Huby (FRA)	19 January 2001 (aged 23)
James Knox (GBR)	4 November 1995 (aged 29)
Yves Lampaert (BEL)	10 April 1991 (aged 33)
Luke Lamperti (USA)	31 December 2002 (aged 22)
Mikel Landa (ESP)	13 December 1989 (aged 35)
William Junior Lecerf (BEL)	15 October 2002 (age 22)
Paul Magnier (FRA)	14 April 2004 (aged 20)

Rider	Date of birth
Tim Merlier (BEL)	30 October 1992 (aged 32)
Valentin Paret-Peintre (FRA)	14 January 2001 (aged 23)
Casper Pedersen (DEN)	15 March 1996 (aged 28)
Andrea Raccagni Noviero (ITA)	26 January 2004 (aged 20)
Pepijn Reinderink (NED)	4 May 2002 (aged 22)
Pieter Serry (BEL)	21 November 1988 (aged 36)
Maximilian Schachmann (GER)	9 January 1994 (aged 30)
Martin Svrček (SVK)	17 February 2003 (aged 21)
Dries Van Gestel (BEL)	30 September 1994 (aged 30)
Bert Van Lerberghe (BEL)	29 September 1992 (aged 32)
Ilan Van Wilder (BEL)	14 May 2000 (aged 24)
Warre Vangheluwe (BEL)	23 July 2001 (age 24)
Mauri Vansevenant (BEL)	1 June 1999 (aged 25)
Louis Vervaeke (BEL)	6 October 1993 (aged 31)
Jordi Warlop (BEL)	4 June 1996 (aged 28)

== Season victories ==
Date	Race	Competition	Rider	Country	Location	Ref.
28 January	AlUla Tour, stage 1	UCI Asia Tour	Tim Merlier (BEL)	Saudi Arabia	Al Manshiyah Train Station	
30 January	AlUla Tour, stage 3	UCI Asia Tour	Tim Merlier (BEL)	Saudi Arabia	Tayma Fort	
5 February	Étoile de Bessèges, stage 1	UCI Europe Tour	Paul Magnier (FRA)	France	Bellegarde	
9 February	Tour of Oman, stage 2	UCI ProSeries	Louis Vervaeke (BEL)	Oman	Yiti	
12 February	Tour of Oman, stage 5	UCI ProSeries	Valentin Paret-Peintre (FRA)	Oman	Jebel Akhdar	
21 February	UAE Tour, stage 5	UCI World Tour	Tim Merlier (BEL)	United Arab Emirates	Hamdan Bin Mohammed Smart University	
22 February	UAE Tour, stage 6	UCI World Tour	Tim Merlier (BEL)	United Arab Emirates	Abu Dhabi	
9 March	Paris–Nice, stage 1	UCI World Tour	Tim Merlier (BEL)	France	Le Perray-en-Yvelines	
10 March	Paris–Nice, stage 2	UCI World Tour	Tim Merlier (BEL)	France	Bellegarde	
7 April	Tour of the Basque Country, stage 1 (ITT)	UCI World Tour	Max Schachmann (GER)	Spain	Vitoria-Gasteiz	
9 April	Scheldeprijs	UCI ProSeries	Tim Merlier (BEL)	Netherlands	Schoten	
18 April	Brabantse Pijl	UCI ProSeries	Remco Evenepoel (BEL)	Belgium	Beersel	
4 May	Tour de Romandie, stage 5 (ITT)	UCI World Tour	Remco Evenepoel (BEL)	Switzerland	Geneva	
7 June	Heylen Vastgoed Heistse Pijl	UCI Europe Tour	Paul Magnier (FRA)	Belgium	Heist-op-den-Berg	
8 June	Brussels Cycling Classic	UCI ProSeries	Tim Merlier (BEL)	Belgium	Brussels	
11 June	Critérium du Dauphiné, stage 4 (ITT)	UCI World Tour	Remco Evenepoel (BEL)	France	Saint-Péray	
14 June	Dwars door het Hageland	UCI ProSeries	Paul Magnier (FRA)	Belgium	Diest	
15 June	Elfstedenronde	UCI Europe Tour	Paul Magnier (FRA)	Belgium	Bruges	
18 June	Tour of Belgium, stage 1	UCI ProSeries	Tim Merlier (BEL)	Belgium	Knokke-Heist	
20 June	Tour of Belgium, stage 3 (ITT)	UCI ProSeries	Ethan Hayter (GBR)	Belgium	Ham	
22 June	Tour of Belgium, stage 5	UCI ProSeries	Tim Merlier (BEL)	Belgium	Brussels	
7 July	Tour de France, stage 3	UCI World Tour	Tim Merlier (BEL)	France	Dunkirk	
9 July	Tour de France, stage 5 (ITT)	UCI World Tour	Remco Evenepoel (BEL)	France	Caen	
13 July	Tour de France, stage 9	UCI World Tour	Tim Merlier (BEL)	France	Châteauroux	
22 July	Tour de France, stage 16	UCI World Tour	Valentin Paret-Peintre (FRA)	France	Mont Ventoux	
7 August	Tour de Pologne, stage 4	UCI World Tour	Paul Magnier (FRA)	Poland	Cieszyn	
14 August	Czech Tour, stage 1	UCI Europe Tour	Luke Lamperti (USA)	Czech Republic	Karlovy Vary	
15 August	Czech Tour, stage 2	UCI Europe Tour	Junior Lecerf (BEL)	Czech Republic	Dlouhé Stráně	

== National, Continental, and World Champions ==
Date	Discipline	Jersey	Rider	Country	Location	Ref.
26 June	British National Time Trial Championships		Ethan Hayter (GBR)	United Kingdom	Aberaeron	
27 June	Belgian National Time Trial Championships		Remco Evenepoel (BEL)	Belgium	Brasschaat	
27 June	German National Time Trial Championships		Maximilian Schachmann (GER)	Germany	Ramstein	
