= 2021 Alpecin–Fenix season =

Alpecin–Fenix
- 2021 season
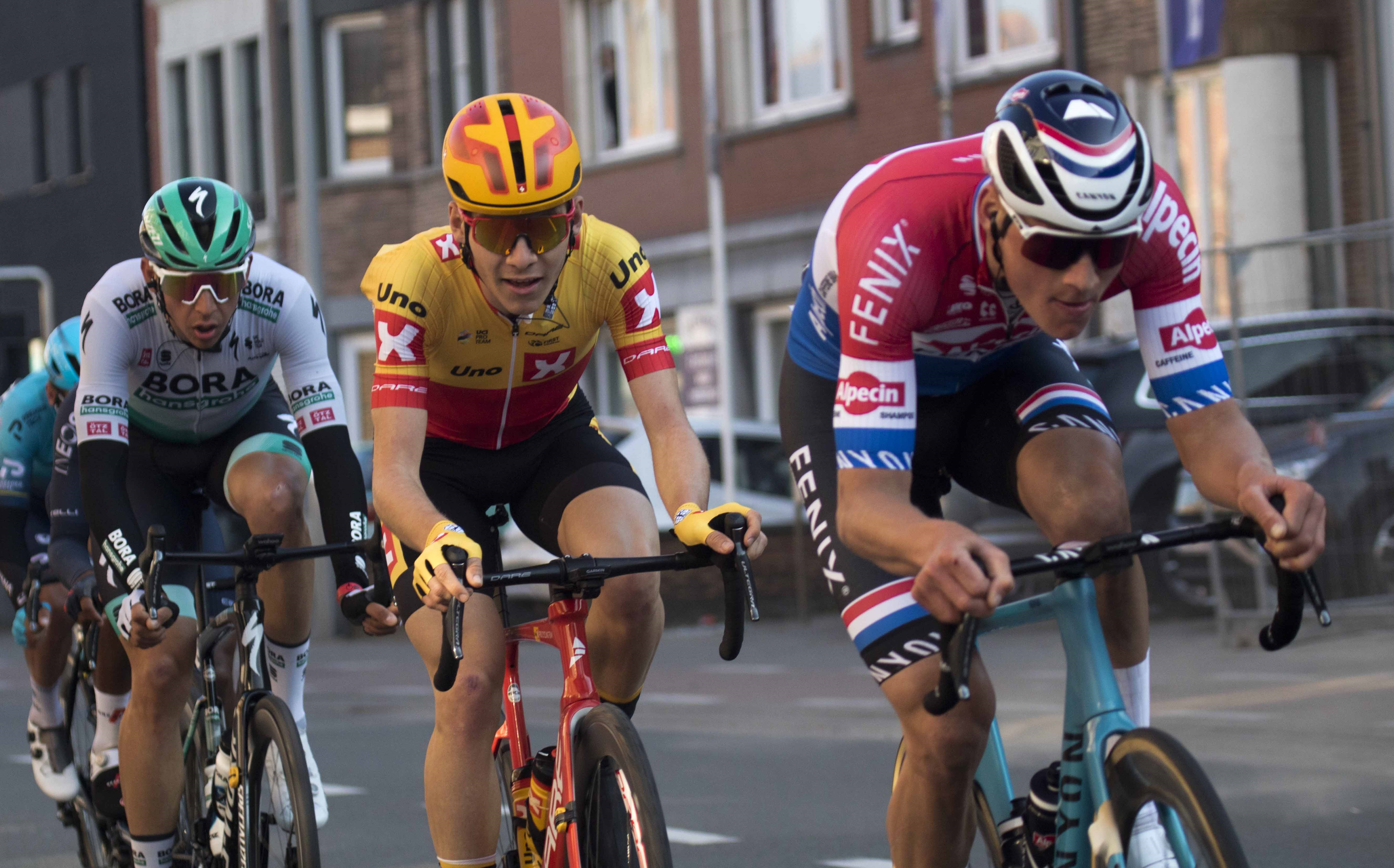
- Mathieu van der Poel (right) during Kuurne–Brussels–Kuurne
- UCI code: AFC
- Status: UCI ProTeam
- World Tour Rank: 6th
- Manager: Christoph Roodhooft (BEL); Philip Roodhooft (BEL)
- Main sponsor(s): Alpecin; Fenix
- Based: Belgium
- Bicycles: Canyon
- Groupset: Shimano

Season victories
- One-day races: 13
- Stage race stages: 17
- National Championships: 1
- Most wins: Jasper Philipsen (BEL) (10)
- Best ranked rider: Mathieu van der Poel (NED) (7th)

The 2021 season for Alpecin–Fenix was the 13th season in the team's existence, the third as a UCI ProTeam, and the second under the current name.

As the best performing UCI ProTeam in the 2020 season, Alpecin–Fenix were guaranteed invitations to all events in the 2021 UCI World Tour. The team finished the season once again as the best UCI ProTeam, ensuring UCI World Tour invitations in 2022.

== Team roster ==
As of 7 April 2021.

Rider	Date of birth
Edward Anderson (USA)	18 April 1998 (aged 22)
Tobias Bayer (AUT)	17 November 1999 (aged 21)
Dries De Bondt (BEL)	4 July 1991 (aged 29)
Floris De Tier (BEL)	20 January 1992 (aged 28)
Laurens De Vreese (BEL)	29 September 1988 (aged 32)
Silvan Dillier (SUI)	3 August 1990 (aged 30)
Roy Jans (BEL)	15 September 1990 (aged 30)
Jimmy Janssens (BEL)	30 May 1989 (aged 31)
Alexander Krieger (GER)	28 November 1991 (aged 29)
Senne Leysen (BEL)	18 March 1996 (aged 24)
Marcel Meisen (GER)	8 January 1989 (aged 31)
Tim Merlier (BEL)	30 October 1992 (aged 28)
Xandro Meurisse (BEL)	31 January 1992 (aged 28)
Sacha Modolo (ITA)	19 June 1987 (aged 33)
Jasper Philipsen (BEL)	2 March 1998 (aged 22)
Edward Planckaert (BEL)	1 February 1995 (aged 25)
Alexandar Richardson (GBR)	30 April 1990 (aged 30)

Rider	Date of birth
Jonas Rickaert (BEL)	7 February 1994 (aged 26)
Oscar Riesebeek (NED)	23 December 1992 (aged 28)
Kristian Sbaragli (ITA)	8 May 1990 (aged 30)
Diether Sweeck (Note: Sweeck was demoted to the Alpecin–Fenix Development Team on 12 April.) (BEL)	17 December 1993 (aged 27)
Lionel Taminiaux (BEL)	21 May 1996 (aged 24)
Scott Thwaites (GBR)	12 February 1990 (aged 30)
Ben Tulett (GBR)	26 August 2001 (aged 19)
Petr Vakoč (CZE)	11 July 1992 (aged 28)
David van der Poel (NED)	15 June 1992 (aged 28)
Mathieu van der Poel (NED)	19 January 1995 (aged 25)
Otto Vergaerde (BEL)	15 July 1994 (aged 26)
Gianni Vermeersch (BEL)	19 November 1992 (aged 28)
Julien Vermote (Note: Vermote joined the team on 31 March, having been without a team since the end of the 2021 season.) (BEL)	26 July 1989 (aged 31)
Louis Vervaeke (BEL)	6 October 1993 (aged 27)
Jay Vine (AUS)	16 November 1995 (aged 25)
Philipp Walsleben (GER)	19 November 1987 (aged 33)

Riders who joined the team for the 2021 season

Rider	2020 team
Edward Anderson	neo-pro (Hagens Berman Axeon)
Tobias Bayer	neo-pro (Tirol KTM Cycling Team)
Laurens De Vreese	Astana
Silvan Dillier	AG2R La Mondiale
Xandro Meurisse	Circus–Wanty Gobert
Jasper Philipsen	UAE Team Emirates
Edward Planckaert	Sport Vlaanderen–Baloise
Lionel Taminiaux	Bingoal–Wallonie Bruxelles
Julien Vermote	Cofidis
Jay Vine	neo-pro (Nero Continental via Zwift Academy)

Riders who left the team during or after the 2020 season

Rider	2021 team
Antoine Benoist	Alpecin–Fenix Development Team
Petter Fagerhaug	
Sam Gaze	Alpecin–Fenix Development Team
Lasse Norman Hansen	Team Qhubeka Assos
Loris Rouiller	Alpecin–Fenix Development Team
Diether Sweeck	Alpecin–Fenix Development Team

== Season victories ==
Date	Race	Competition	Rider	Country	Location	Ref.
21 February	UAE Tour, Stage 1	UCI World Tour	Mathieu van der Poel (NED)	United Arab Emirates	Al Mirfa	
2 March	Le Samyn	UCI Europe Tour	Tim Merlier (BEL)	Belgium	Dour	
6 March	Strade Bianche	UCI World Tour	Mathieu van der Poel (NED)	Italy	Siena	
7 March	Grote Prijs Jean-Pierre Monseré	UCI Europe Tour	Tim Merlier (BEL)	Belgium	Roeselare	
12 March	Tirreno–Adriatico, Stage 3	UCI World Tour	Mathieu van der Poel (NED)	Italy	Gualdo Tadino	
14 March	Tirreno–Adriatico, Stage 5	UCI World Tour	Mathieu van der Poel (NED)	Italy	Castelfidardo	
19 March	Bredene Koksijde Classic	UCI Europe Tour; UCI ProSeries	Tim Merlier (BEL)	Belgium	Koksijde	
7 April	Scheldeprijs	UCI Europe Tour; UCI ProSeries	Jasper Philipsen (BEL)	Belgium	Schoten	
16 April	Presidential Tour of Turkey, Stage 6	UCI Europe Tour; UCI ProSeries	Jasper Philipsen (BEL)	Turkey	Marmaris	
17 April	Presidential Tour of Turkey, Stage 7	UCI Europe Tour; UCI ProSeries	Jasper Philipsen (BEL)	Turkey	Turgutreis	
18 April	Presidential Tour of Turkey, Points classification	UCI Europe Tour; UCI ProSeries	Jasper Philipsen (BEL)	Turkey		
9 May	Giro d'Italia, Stage 2	UCI World Tour	Tim Merlier (BEL)	Italy	Novara	
24 May	Ronde van Limburg	UCI Europe Tour	Tim Merlier (BEL)	Belgium	Tongeren	
27 May	Boucles de la Mayenne, Stage 1	UCI Europe Tour; UCI ProSeries	Philipp Walsleben (GER)	France	Ambrières-les-Vallées	
6 June	Elfstedenronde	UCI Europe Tour	Tim Merlier (BEL)	Belgium	Bruges	
7 June	Tour de Suisse, Stage 2	UCI World Tour	Mathieu van der Poel (NED)	Switzerland	Lachen	
8 June	Tour de Suisse, Stage 3	UCI World Tour	Mathieu van der Poel (NED)	Switzerland	Pfaffnau	
27 June	Tour de France, Stage 2	UCI World Tour	Mathieu van der Poel (NED)	France	Mûr-de-Bretagne (Guerlédan)	
28 June	Tour de France, Stage 3	UCI World Tour	Tim Merlier (BEL)	France	Pontivy	
24 July	Tour de Wallonie, Sprints classification	UCI Europe Tour; UCI ProSeries	Dries De Bondt (BEL)	Belgium		
3 August	Vuelta a Burgos, Stage 1	UCI Europe Tour; UCI ProSeries	Edward Planckaert (BEL)	Spain	Burgos (El Castillo)	
8 August	Arctic Race of Norway, Stage 4	UCI Europe Tour; UCI ProSeries	Philipp Walsleben (GER)	Norway	Harstad	
15 August	Vuelta a España, Stage 2	UCI World Tour	Jasper Philipsen (BEL)	Spain	Burgos	
18 August	Vuelta a España, Stage 5	UCI World Tour	Jasper Philipsen (BEL)	Spain	Albacete	
29 August	Deutschland Tour, Mountains classification	UCI Europe Tour; UCI ProSeries	Louis Vervaeke (BEL)	Germany		
30 August	Benelux Tour, Stage 1	UCI World Tour	Tim Merlier (BEL)	Netherlands	Dokkum	
2 September	Benelux Tour, Stage 4	UCI World Tour	Tim Merlier (BEL)	Belgium	Ardooie	
12 September	Antwerp Port Epic	UCI Europe Tour	Mathieu van der Poel (NED)	Belgium	Antwerp	
16 September	Tour de Luxembourg, Stage 3	UCI Europe Tour; UCI ProSeries	Sacha Modolo (ITA)	Luxembourg	Mamer	
17 September	Kampioenschap van Vlaanderen	UCI Europe Tour	Jasper Philipsen (BEL)	Belgium	Koolskamp	
19 September	Eschborn–Frankfurt	UCI World Tour	Jasper Philipsen (BEL)	Germany	Frankfurt	
21 September	Grand Prix de Denain	UCI Europe Tour; UCI ProSeries	Jasper Philipsen (BEL)	France	Denain	
26 September	Paris–Chauny	UCI Europe Tour	Jasper Philipsen (BEL)	France	Chauny	
13 October	Giro del Veneto	UCI Europe Tour	Xandro Meurisse (BEL)	Italy	Padova	

== National, Continental, and World Champions ==
Date	Discipline	Jersey	Rider	Country	Location	Ref.
20 June	Swiss National Road Race Championships		Silvan Dillier (SUI)	Switzerland	Knutwil	
