= 2022 Alpecin–Fenix season =

Belgian cycling team

Alpecin–Fenix
- 2022 season
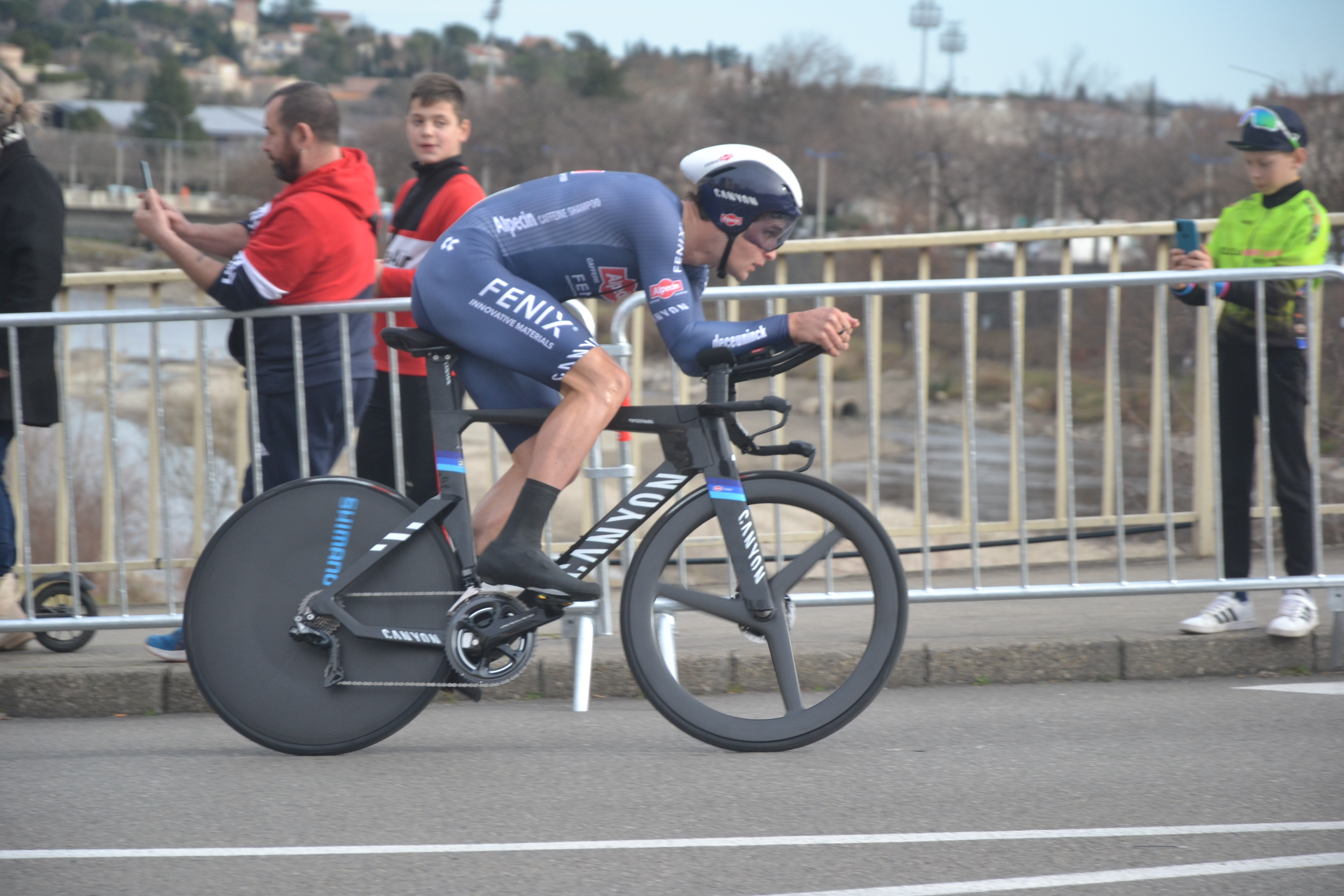
- Sam Gaze on Stage 5 of Étoile de Bessèges
- UCI code: AFC
- Status: UCI ProTeam
- Manager: Christoph Roodhooft (BEL); Philip Roodhooft (BEL)
- Main sponsor(s): Alpecin; Fenix
- Based: Belgium
- Bicycles: Canyon
- Groupset: Shimano

Season victories
- One-day races: 3
- Stage race stages: 13
- Jersey

The 2022 season for Alpecin–Fenix is the 14th season in the team's existence, the fourth as a UCI ProTeam, and the third under the current name. They use Canyon bicycles, Shimano drivetrain, Shimano wheels and Kalas clothing.

In the 2021 season, Alpecin–Fenix repeated as the best performing UCI ProTeam and, as a result, are guaranteed invitations to all events in the 2022 UCI World Tour.

== Team roster ==
As of 11 January 2022.

Rider	Date of birth
Edward Anderson (USA)	18 April 1998 (aged 23)
Maurice Ballerstedt (GER)	16 January 2001 (aged 20)
Sjoerd Bax (NED)	6 January 1996 (aged 25)
Tobias Bayer (AUT)	17 November 1999 (aged 22)
Dries De Bondt (BEL)	4 July 1991 (aged 30)
Floris De Tier (BEL)	20 January 1992 (aged 29)
Silvan Dillier (SUI)	3 August 1990 (aged 31)
Sam Gaze (NZL)	12 December 1995 (aged 26)
Michael Gogl (AUT)	4 November 1993 (aged 28)
Jimmy Janssens (BEL)	30 May 1989 (aged 32)
Alexander Krieger (GER)	28 November 1991 (aged 30)
Senne Leysen (BEL)	18 March 1996 (aged 25)
Jakub Mareczko (ITA)	30 April 1994 (aged 27)
Tim Merlier (BEL)	30 October 1992 (aged 29)
Xandro Meurisse (BEL)	31 January 1992 (aged 29)
Stefano Oldani (ITA)	10 January 1998 (aged 23)

Rider	Date of birth
Jasper Philipsen (BEL)	2 March 1998 (aged 23)
Edward Planckaert (BEL)	1 February 1995 (aged 26)
Jonas Rickaert (BEL)	7 February 1994 (aged 27)
Oscar Riesebeek (NED)	23 December 1992 (aged 29)
Kristian Sbaragli (ITA)	8 May 1990 (aged 31)
Robert Stannard (AUS)	16 September 1998 (aged 23)
Lionel Taminiaux (BEL)	21 May 1996 (aged 25)
Scott Thwaites (GBR)	12 February 1990 (aged 31)
Fabio Van den Bossche (BEL)	21 September 2000 (aged 21)
David van der Poel (NED)	15 June 1992 (aged 29)
Mathieu van der Poel (NED)	19 January 1995 (aged 26)
Guillaume Van Keirsbulck (BEL)	14 February 1991 (aged 30)
Gianni Vermeersch (BEL)	19 November 1992 (aged 29)
Julien Vermote (BEL)	26 July 1989 (aged 32)
Jay Vine (AUS)	16 November 1995 (aged 26)

Riders who joined the team for the 2022 season

Rider	2021 team
Maurice Ballerstedt	neo-pro (Jumbo–Visma Development Team)
Sjoerd Bax	neo-pro (Metec–Solarwatt p/b Mantel)
Sam Gaze	Alpecin–Fenix Development Team
Michael Gogl	Team Qhubeka NextHash
Jakub Mareczko	Vini Zabù
Stefano Oldani	Lotto–Soudal
Robert Stannard	Team BikeExchange
Fabio Van den Bossche	Sport Vlaanderen–Baloise
Guillaume Van Keirsbulck	Alpecin–Fenix Development Team

Riders who left the team during or after the 2021 season

Rider	2022 team
Laurens De Vreese	
Roy Jans	Retired
Marcel Meisen	Stevens
Sacha Modolo	Bardiani–CSF–Faizanè
Alexandar Richardson	
Ben Tulett	INEOS Grenadiers
Petr Vakoč	Retired
Otto Vergaerde	Trek–Segafredo
Louis Vervaeke	Quick-Step Alpha Vinyl Team
Philipp Walsleben	Retired

== Season victories ==
Date	Race	Competition	Rider	Country	Location	Ref.
6 February	Étoile de Bessèges, Mountains classification	UCI Europe Tour	Jay Vine (AUS)	France		
13 February	Tour of Antalya, Stage 4	UCI Europe Tour	Jakub Mareczko (ITA)	Turkey	Antalya	
13 February	Tour of Antalya, Points classification	UCI Europe Tour	Jakub Mareczko (ITA)	Turkey		
20 February	UAE Tour, Stage 1	UCI World Tour	Jasper Philipsen (BEL)	United Arab Emirates	Madinat Zayed	
24 February	UAE Tour, Stage 5	UCI World Tour	Jasper Philipsen (BEL)	United Arab Emirates	Al Marjan Island	
26 February	UAE Tour, Points classification	UCI World Tour	Jasper Philipsen (BEL)	United Arab Emirates		
8 March	Tirreno–Adriatico, Stage 2	UCI World Tour	Tim Merlier (BEL)	Italy	Sovicille	
16 March	Nokere Koerse	UCI ProSeries	Tim Merlier (BEL)	Belgium	Nokere	
23 March	Classic Brugge–De Panne	UCI World Tour	Tim Merlier (BEL)	Belgium	De Panne	
25 March	Settimana Internazionale di Coppi e Bartali, Stage 4	UCI Europe Tour	Mathieu van der Poel (NED)	Italy	Montecatini Terme	
30 March	Dwars door Vlaanderen	UCI World Tour	Mathieu van der Poel (NED)	Belgium	Waregem	
8 April	Circuit de la Sarthe, Team classification	UCI Europe Tour	(Note: The riders in the squad were Floris De Tier, Jimmy Janssens, Xandro Meurisse, Robert Stannard, Scott Thwaites, and Fabio Van den Bossche.)	France		
12 April	Presidential Tour of Turkey, Stage 3	UCI ProSeries	Jasper Philipsen (BEL)	Turkey	İzmir (Karşıyaka)	
17 April	Presidential Tour of Turkey, Points classification	UCI ProSeries	Jasper Philipsen (BEL)	Turkey		
6 May	Four Days of Dunkirk, Stage 4	UCI ProSeries	Lionel Taminiaux (BEL)	France	Aire-sur-la-Lys	
6 May	Giro d'Italia, Stage 1	UCI World Tour	Mathieu van der Poel (NED)	Hungary	Visegrád	
7 May	Four Days of Dunkirk, Stage 5	UCI ProSeries	Gianni Vermeersch (BEL)	France	Cassel	
19 May	Giro d'Italia, Stage 12	UCI World Tour	Stefano Oldani (ITA)	Italy	Genoa	
26 May	Giro d'Italia, Stage 18	UCI World Tour	Dries De Bondt (BEL)	Italy	Treviso	
18 July	Tour de France, Stage 15	UCI World Tour	Jasper Philipsen (BEL)	France	Carcassonne	

== National, Continental, and World Champions ==
Date	Discipline	Jersey	Rider	Country	Location	Ref.
