= Pierre Barbier =

French cyclist (born 1997)

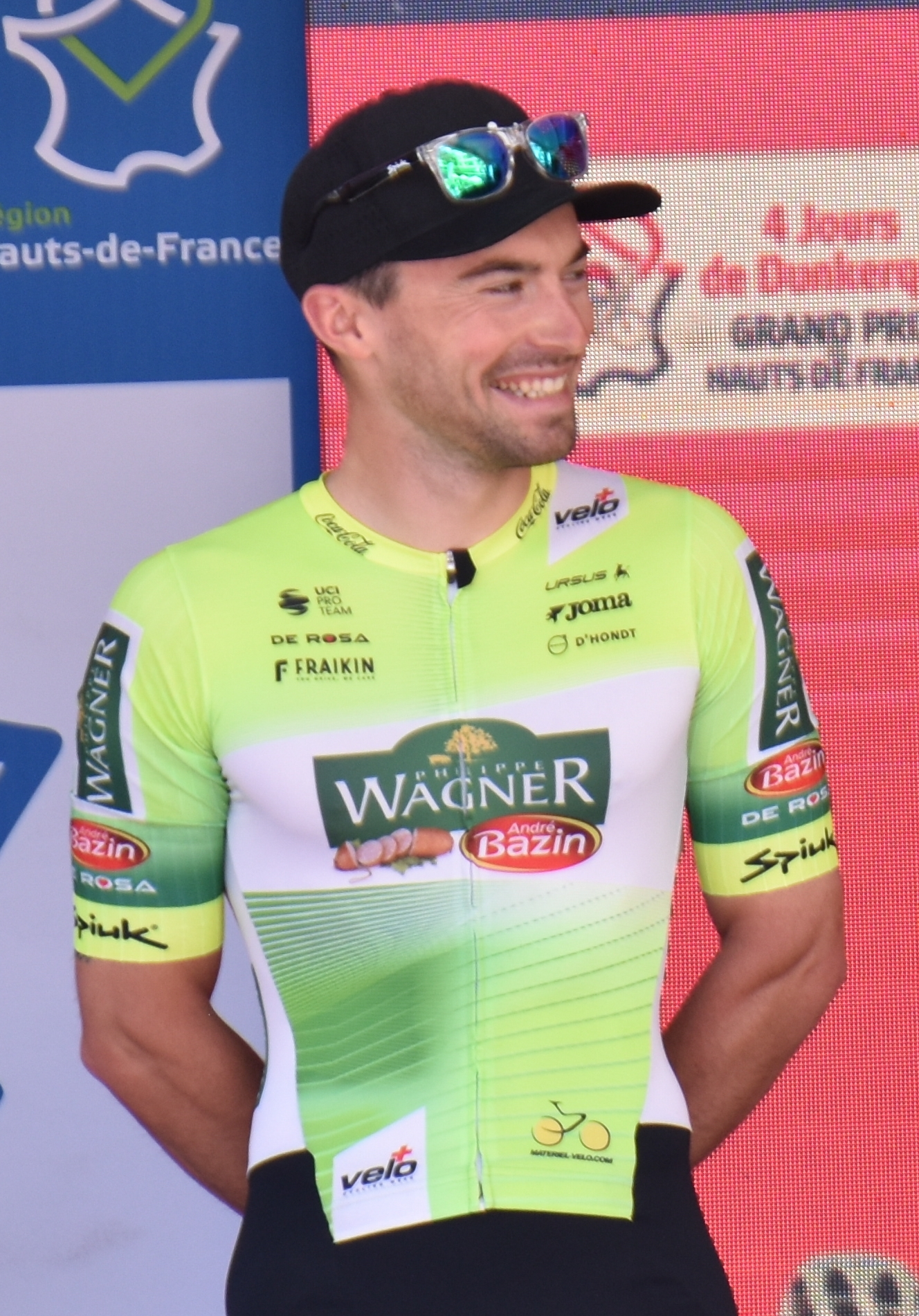
- Barbier in 2025

Personal information
- Full name: Pierre Barbier
- Born: 25 September 1997 (age 29) Beauvais, France
- Height: 1.76 m (5 ft 9 in)
- Weight: 69 kg (152 lb)

Cycling career
- Sport: Cycling
- Current team: Terengganu Cycling Team
- Discipline: Road
- Role: Rider
- Rider type: Sprinter

Amateur teams
- 2011–2013: Le Guidon Breslois
- 2014–2015: VC Saint-Quentin Junior
- 2016: VC Rouen 76
- 2016: Roubaix–Métropole Européenne de Lille (stagiaire)
- 2017: BMC Development Team

Professional teams
- 2018–2019: Roubaix–Lille Métropole
- 2020–2021: Nippo–Delko–One Provence
- 2022: B&B Hotels–KTM
- 2023: CIC U Nantes Atlantique
- 2024: Philippe Wagner–Bazin
- 2025: Wagner Bazin WB
- 2026–: Terengganu Cycling Team

Pierre Barbier (born 25 September 1997) is a French professional road cyclist, who currently rides for UCI Continental Team Terengganu Cycling Team.

He is the younger brother of the cyclist Rudy Barbier.

== Major results ==
2014
10th Gent–Menen
2015
10th Overall Tour de l'Abitibi
2016
3rd Paris–Troyes
2017
5th Grand Prix de la ville de Pérenchies
2018
2nd Grote Prijs Jean-Pierre Monseré
4th ZLM Tour
2019
3rd Grand Prix de la Somme
5th GP de Fourmies
6th Route Adélie
7th Grand Prix de Denain
7th Paris–Troyes
7th Paris–Bourges
2020
1st Stage 3 Tour of Bulgaria
9th Paris–Chauny
2021
3rd Cholet-Pays de la Loire
4th Grote Prijs Jean-Pierre Monseré
2022
4th Grand Prix de Denain
6th Grote Prijs Jean-Pierre Monseré
6th Grote Prijs Marcel Kint
8th Nokere Koerse
9th Cholet-Pays de la Loire
9th Kampioenschap van Vlaanderen
10th Grand Prix d'Isbergues
2023
3rd La Roue Tourangelle
7th Le Tour des 100 Communes
2024
1st Overall Ronde de l'Oise

1st Points classification
1st Stages 3 & 4

Tour of Sharjah

1st Points classification
1st Stage 2 & 4

2nd Omloop van het Waasland
3rd Omloop van het Houtland
3rd Elfstedenronde
4th Grand Prix Criquielion
2025
4th Ronde van Limburg
2026
1st Grand Prix Alaiye
