= Milan Menten =

Belgian cyclist

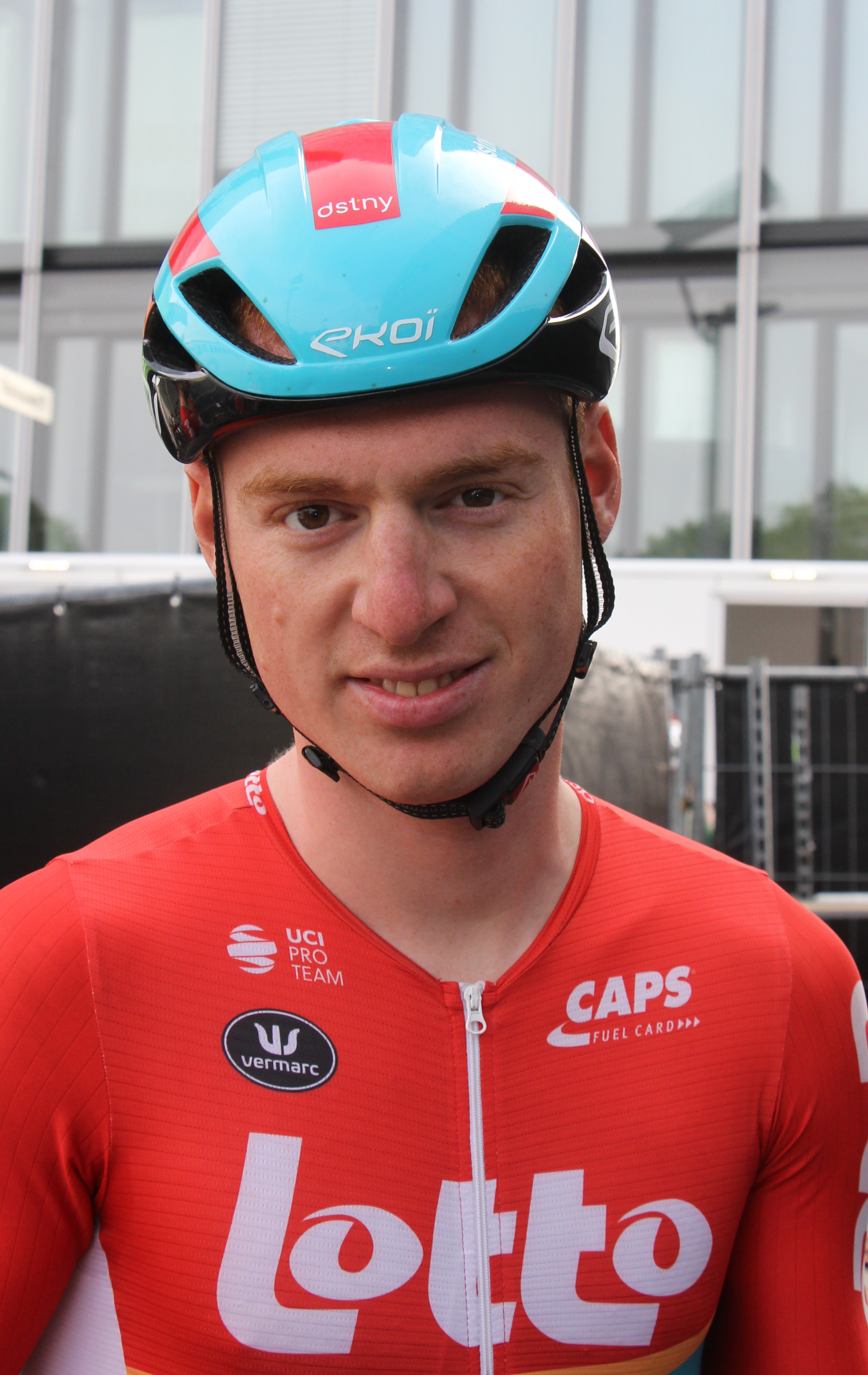
- Menten in 2023

Personal information
- Born: 31 October 1996 (age 29) Bilzen, Belgium
- Height: 1.74 m (5 ft 9 in)
- Weight: 68 kg (150 lb)

Cycling career
- Sport: Cycling
- Current team: Lotto–Intermarché
- Discipline: Road
- Role: Rider
- Rider type: Sprinter

Amateur team
- 2015–2017: Lotto–Soudal U23

Professional teams
- 2018–2020: Sport Vlaanderen–Baloise
- 2021–2022: Bingoal WB
- 2023–: Lotto–Dstny

Milan Menten (born 31 October 1996) is a Belgian cyclist, who currently rides for UCI WorldTeam Lotto–Intermarché.

== Major results ==
2014
1st Stage 3 Trofeo Karlsberg
2016
4th Grote Prijs Stad Sint-Niklaas
2017
2nd Paris–Tours Espoirs
5th Overall Okolo Jižních Čech

1st Stage 1 (TTT)

2018
5th Paris–Bourges
5th Famenne Ardenne Classic
9th Elfstedenronde
2019
7th Grand Prix Pino Cerami
8th Grand Prix d'Ouverture La Marseillaise
2020
10th Gooikse Pijl
2021 (1 pro win)
1st Stage 3 CRO Race
1st Points classification, Kreiz Breizh Elites
5th Road race, National Road Championships
6th Ronde van Limburg
7th Binche–Chimay–Binche
9th La Roue Tourangelle
9th Paris–Bourges
10th Le Samyn
10th Overall Tour de Wallonie
2022
1st Grand Prix de la Ville de Lillers
4th Ronde van Limburg
4th Schaal Sels
5th Road race, National Road Championships
7th Circuit de Wallonie
8th Circuit Franco-Belge
9th Druivenkoers Overijse
9th Antwerp Port Epic
2023 (1)
1st Le Samyn
2nd Grand Prix Criquielion
2nd Rund um Köln
3rd Nokere Koerse
4th Circuit de Wallonie
5th Overall Boucles de la Mayenne
5th Volta Limburg Classic
6th Ronde van Drenthe
7th Grand Prix de Denain
9th Vuelta a Murcia
2024
3rd Tour of Leuven
5th Overall Tour of Istanbul
5th Grand Prix Criquielion
8th Nokere Koerse
8th Muur Classic Geraardsbergen
2025
3rd Ronde van Limburg
4th Brussels Cycling Classic
5th Nokere Koerse
5th Rund um Köln
6th Overall Tour of Taihu Lake
7th Volta NXT Classic
7th Muur Classic Geraardsbergen
9th Brabantse Pijl
10th Famenne Ardenne Classic
2026
2nd Grand Prix de Denain
5th Nokere Koerse
5th Famenne Ardenne Classic
9th Ronde van Limburg

=== Grand Tour general classification results timeline ===
Grand Tour	2023	2024	2025	2026
Giro d'Italia	—	—	—	DNF
Tour de France	—	—	—	—
Vuelta a España	142	—	—	—

Legend
—	Did not compete
DNF	Did not finish
