= Stanisław Aniołkowski =

Polish cyclist

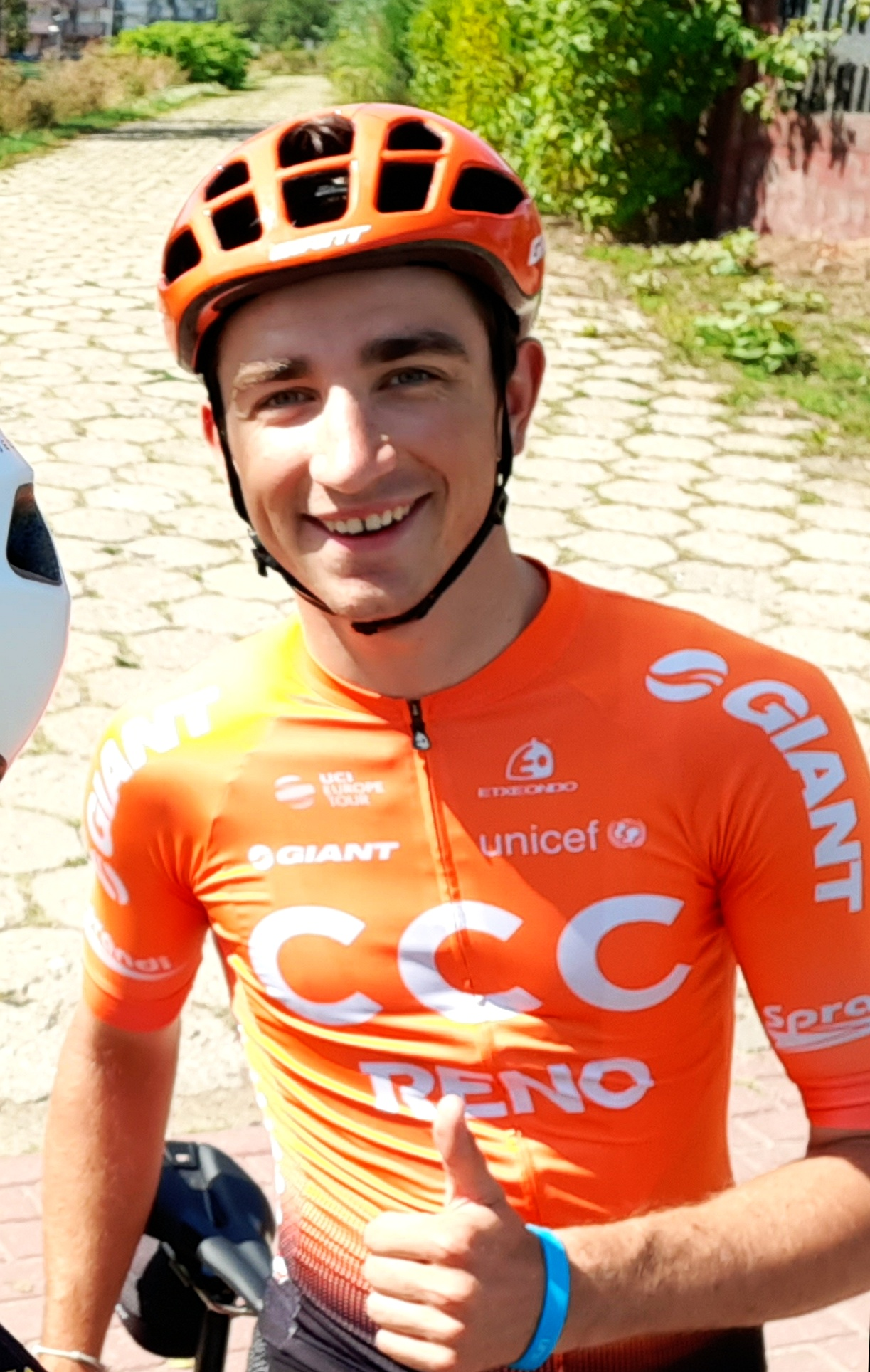
- Aniołkowski in 2019

Personal information
- Full name: Stanisław Aniołkowski
- Born: 20 January 1997 (age 29) Warsaw, Poland
- Height: 1.81 m (5 ft 11 in)
- Weight: 68 kg (150 lb)

Cycling career
- Sport: Cycling
- Current team: Cofidis
- Discipline: Road
- Role: Rider
- Rider type: Sprinter

Professional teams
- 2016: Verva ActiveJet
- 2017–2018: Team Hurom
- 2019–2020: CCC Development Team
- 2021–2022: Bingoal WB
- 2023: Human Powered Health
- 2024–: Cofidis

Major wins
- One-day races and Classics National Road Race Championships (2020)

Stanisław Aniołkowski (born 20 January 1997) is a Polish cyclist, who currently rides for UCI WorldTeam Cofidis.

== Major results ==
2015
2nd Overall La Coupe du Président de la Ville de Grudziądz

1st Points classification
1st Stage 4

2016
4th Road race, National Under-23 Road Championships
2019 (2 pro wins)
1st Overall Dookoła Mazowsza

1st Young rider classification
1st Stage 3

Carpathian Couriers Race

1st Stages 3 & 5

1st Stage 4 Course de Solidarność et des Champions Olympiques
Tour of Romania

1st Stages 2 & 5

3rd Overall Szlakiem Walk Majora Hubala

1st Young rider classification

4th Road race, UEC European Under-23 Road Championships
7th Trofej Umag
2020 (1)
1st Road race, National Road Championships
1st Overall Bałtyk–Karkonosze Tour

1st Stage 4

1st Overall Course de Solidarność et des Champions Olympiques

1st Points classification
1st Stage 3

1st GP Slovakia
3rd Puchar Ministra Obrony Narodowej
3rd Overall Tour of Szeklerland

1st Points classification

6th Overall Tour of Małopolska

1st Stage 1

9th Overall Dookoła Mazowsza
2021
4th Circuit de Wallonie
6th Bredene Koksijde Classic
10th Classic Brugge–De Panne
10th Kampioenschap van Vlaanderen
2022
4th Clásica de Almería
7th Elfstedenronde
8th Ronde van Limburg
10th Grote Prijs Jean-Pierre Monseré
2023 (2)
2nd Memoriał Andrzeja Trochanowskiego
3rd Overall International Tour of Hellas

1st Stages 1 & 4

3rd Ronde van Limburg
6th Trofeo Palma
2024
5th Gooikse Pijl
8th Road race, UEC European Road Championships
8th Dwars door het Hageland
9th Vuelta a Castilla y León
2025
2nd Trofeo Palma
4th Grand Prix d'Isbergues
6th Scheldeprijs
9th Copenhagen Sprint
9th Antwerp Port Epic
2026 (1)
1st Stage 4 Tour of Turkiye
4th Tour of Bruges
5th Grote Prijs Jean-Pierre Monseré
6th Bredene Koksijde Classic
6th Ronde van Limburg

=== Grand Tour general classification results timeline ===
Grand Tour	2024	2025
Giro d'Italia	129	—
Tour de France	—	—
Vuelta a España	—	152

Legend
—	Did not compete
DNF	Did not finish
