= 2022 European Road Championships – Men's road race =

Men's elite road race
2022 European Road Championships

Race details
- Dates: 14 August 2022
- Stages: 1
- Distance: 209.4 km (130.1 mi)

Medalists
	Gold	Fabio Jakobsen (NED)
	Silver	Arnaud Démare (FRA)
	Bronze	Tim Merlier (BEL)

The men's elite road race at the 2022 European Road Championships took place on 14 August 2022, in Munich, Germany. Nations were allowed to enter between 1 and 8 riders into the event, dependent on UCI rankings.

== Results ==
Rank	#	Cyclist	Nation	Time	Diff.
1st place, gold medalist(s)	26	Fabio Jakobsen	Netherlands	4:38:49	
2nd place, silver medalist(s)	19	Arnaud Démare	France	s.t.	
3rd place, bronze medalist(s)	4	Tim Merlier	Belgium	s.t.	
4	31	Danny van Poppel	Netherlands	s.t.	
5	96	Sam Bennett	Ireland	s.t.	
6	10	Luka Mezgec	Slovenia	s.t.	
7	47	Elia Viviani	Italy	s.t.	
8	64	Alexander Kristoff	Norway	s.t.	
9	37	Jon Aberasturi	Spain	s.t.	
10	53	Mads Pedersen	Denmark	s.t.	
11	41	Alberto Dainese	Italy	s.t.	
12	103	Martin Laas	Estonia	s.t.	
13	130	Itamar Einhorn	Israel	s.t.	
14	117	Emīls Liepiņš	Latvia	s.t.	
15	76	Stanisław Aniołkowski	Poland	s.t.	
16	83	Rui Oliveira	Portugal	s.t.	
17	57	Tom Bohli	Switzerland	s.t.	
18	69	Phil Bauhaus	Germany	s.t.	
19	86	Marco Haller	Austria	s.t.	
20	92	Dominik Neuman	Czech Republic	s.t.	
21	120	Tobias Ludvigsson	Sweden	s.t.	
22	110	Cédric Pries	Luxembourg	s.t.	
23	50	Mikkel Frølich Honoré	Denmark	4:38:52	00:03
24	7	Bert van Lerberghe	Belgium	s.t.	
25	62	Simon Pellaud	France	4:38:54	00:05
26	89	Sebastian Schönberger	Austria	4:38:57	00:08
27	84	Tobias Bayer	Austria	s.t.	
28	133	Ylber Sefa	Albania	s.t.	
29	5	Edward Theuns	Belgium	s.t.	
30	21	Hugo Hofstetter	France	s.t.	
31	80	Maciej Bodnar	Poland	s.t.	
32	94	Zdenek Štybar	Czech Republic	4:39:02	00:13
33	52	Michael Mørkøv	Norway	s.t.	
34	93	Jakub Otruba	Czech Republic	4:39:04	00:15
35	116	Matúš Štocek	Slovakia	s.t.	
36	38	Jonathan Lastra	Spain	s.t.	
37	51	Mathias Norsgaard	Denmark	4:39:07	00:18
38	49	Lasse Norman Hansen	Denmark	s.t.	
39	81	Jakub Kaczmarek	Poland	s.t.	
40	100	Rory Townsend	Ireland	s.t.	
41	95	Adam Ťoupalík	Czech Republic	s.t.	
42	91	Tomáš Bárta	Czech Republic	s.t.	
43	112	Marek Čanecký	Slovakia	s.t.	
44	35	Oier Lazkano	Spain	s.t.	
45	109	Colin Heiderscheid	Luxembourg	s.t.	
46	90	Jan Bárta	Czech Republic	s.t.	
47	119	Toms Skujiņš	Latvia	s.t.	
48	131	Viktor Potočki	Croatia	s.t.	
49	126	Georgios Bouglas	Greece	s.t.	
50	82	Filip Maciejuk	Poland	s.t.	
51	61	Reto Hollenstein	Switzerland	s.t.	
52	60	Michael Schär	Switzerland	s.t.	
53	59	Lukas Rüegg	Switzerland	s.t.	
54	123	Ignatas Konovalovas	Lithuania	s.t.	
55	13	Jaka Primožič	Slovenia	s.t.	
56	79	Cesare Benedetti	Poland	4:39:10	00:21
57	40	Filippo Baroncini	Italy	4:39:12	00:23
58	108	Barnabás Peák	Hungary	4:39:14	00:25
59	12	David Per	Slovenia	s.t.	
60	8	Tilen Finkšt	Slovenia	s.t.	
61	42	Filippo Ganna	Italy	s.t.	
62	102	Tanel Kangert	Estonia	4:39:18	00:29
63	106	Norman Vahtra	Estonia	s.t.	
64	46	Matteo Trentin	Italy	s.t.	
65	30	Boy van Poppel	Netherlands	s.t.	
66	43	Jacopo Guarnieri	Italy	s.t.	
67	65	Anders Skaarseth	Norway	4:39:22	00:33
68	66	Rasmus Tiller	Norway	4:39:25	00:36
69	23	Clement Russo	France	4:39:28	00:39
70	36	Manuel Peñalver	Spain	4:39:35	00:46
71	115	Andrej Líška	Slovenia	s.t.	
72	98	Ryan Mullen	Ireland	s.t.	
73	58	Silvan Dillier	Switzerland	s.t.	
74	85	Patrick Gamper	Austria	s.t.	
75	127	Panagiotis Christopoulos-Cheller	Greece	s.t.	
76	129	Yuval Ben Moshe	Israel	s.t.	
77	107	Márton Dina	Hungary	s.t.	
78	56	Stefan Bissegger	Switzerland	s.t.	
79	2	Aimé De Gendt	Belgium	s.t.	
80	6	Dries Van Gestel	Belgium	4:39:39	00:50
81	24	Nils Eekhoff	Netherlands	s.t.	
82	17	Thomas Boudat	France	4:39:43	00:54
83	72	Roger Kluge	Germany	4:39:55	01:06
84	73	Alexander Krieger	Germany	s.t.	
85	105	Oskar Nisu	Estonia	4:40:10	01:21
86	128	Periklis Ilias	Greece	4:40:34	01:45
87	44	Jonathan Milan	Italy	s.t.	
88	14	Jan Tratnik	Slovakia	s.t.	
89	34	David González	Spain	s.t.	
90	97	Edward Dunbar	Ireland	s.t.	
91	25	Daan Hoole	Netherlands	s.t.	
92	29	Jos van Emden	Netherlands	s.t.	
93	32	Jorge Arcas	Spain	4:40:38	01:49
94	104	Karl Patrick Lauk	Estonia	4:40:59	02:10
95	74	Nils Politt	Germany	4:41:14	02:25
96	70	John Degenkolb	Germany	s.t.	
97	18	Bryan Coquard	France	4:41:28	02:39
98	22	Jérémy Lecroq	France	s.t.	
99	121	Eduard-Michael Grosu	Romania	s.t.	
100	16	Rudy Barbier	France	4:41:43	02:54
101	20	Dorian Godon	France	s.t.	
102	87	Patrick Konrad	Austria	4:41:52	03:03
103	75	Michael Schwarzmann	Germany	4:42:01	03:12
104	48	Mikkel Bjerg	Denmark	s.t.	
105	27	Jan Maas	Netherlands	4:42:20	03:31
106	78	Norbert Banaszek	Poland	s.t.	
107	9	Aljaž Jarc	Slovenia	s.t.	
108	99	Matthew Teggart	Ireland	s.t.	
109	118	Mārtiņš Pluto	Latvia	s.t.	
110	15	Matic Žumer	Slovenia	s.t.	
111	139	Ingvar Ómarsson	Norway	s.t.	
112	125	Evaldas Šiškevičius	Lithuania	s.t.	
113	54	Johan Price-Pejtersen	Denmark	4:42:25	03:36
114	33	Iván García Cortina	Spain	s.t.	
115	1	Dries De Bondt	Belgium	4:45:27	06:38
116	3	Rune Herregodts	Belgium	s.t.	
117	45	Luca Mozzato	Italy	s.t.	
118	28	Elmar Reinders	Netherlands	s.t.	
119	39	Xabier Azparren	Spain	s.t.	
120	55	Frederik Wandahl	Denmark	s.t.	
121	63	Jonas Abrahamsen	Norway	4:45:52	07:03
122	67	Syver Wærsted	Belgium	s.t.	
123	71	Nico Denz	Germany	s.t.	
124	124	Venantas Lašinis	Lithuania	4:46:07	07:18
125	88	Lukas Pöstlberger	Austria	4:46:42	07:53
DNF	11	Domen Novak	Slovenia		
DNF	68	Pascal Ackermann	Germany		
DNF	77	Alan Banaszek	Poland		
DNF	111	Erik Baška	Slovakia		
DNF	113	Adam Foltán	Slovakia		
DNF	114	Dávid Kaško	Slovakia		
DNF	122	Mantas Januškevicius	Lithuania		
DNF	132	Marolino Hoxha	Albania		
DNF	134	Olsian Velia	Albania		
DNF	135	Andrej Petrovski	North Macedonia		
DNF	136	Stefan Petrovski	North Macedonia		
DNF	137	Alban Delija	Kosovo		
DNF	138	Blerotn Nuha	Kosovo		
DNF	140	Goran Cerović	Montenegro		
DNF	141	Vedad Karić	Bosnia and Herzegovina		
DNS	142	Stepan Grigoryan	Armenia		
