= 2024 Scheldeprijs =

2024 UCI ProSeries
- Event poster with previous winners Lorena Wiebes and Jasper Philipsen

Race details
- Dates: 3 April 2024
- Stages: 1
- Distance: 205.3 km (127.6 mi)
- Winning time: 4h 16' 59"

Results
	Winner	Tim Merlier (BEL)	(Soudal–Quick-Step)
	Second	Jasper Philipsen (BEL)	(Alpecin–Deceuninck)
	Third	Dylan Groenewegen (NED)	(Team Jayco–AlUla)

The 2024 Scheldeprijs was the 112th edition of the Scheldeprijs road cycling one day race, which was held on 3 April 2024. It was a 1.Pro event on the 2024 UCI ProSeries calendar. The race, which was 205.3 kilometres (127.6 mi) long, started in Terneuzen in the Netherlands and finished in Schoten on the outskirts of Antwerp.

== Teams ==
Eleven of the eighteen UCI WorldTeams, nine UCI ProTeams, and two UCI Continental teams made up the twenty-two teams that participated in the race.

UCI WorldTeams

- Alpecin–Deceuninck
- Arkéa–B&B Hotels
- Astana Qazaqstan Team
- Bora–Hansgrohe
- Cofidis
- Intermarché–Wanty
- Lidl–Trek
- Soudal–Quick-Step
- Team dsm–firmenich PostNL
- Team Jayco–AlUla
- UAE Team Emirates

UCI ProTeams

- Bingoal WB
- Israel–Premier Tech
- Lotto–Dstny
- Q36.5 Pro Cycling Team
- TDT–Unibet Cycling Team
- Team Flanders–Baloise
- Team TotalEnergies
- Tudor Pro Cycling Team
- Uno-X Mobility

UCI Continental Teams

- BEAT Cycling Club
- Tarteletto–Isorex

== Result ==
Result
Rank	Rider	Team	Time
1	Tim Merlier (BEL)	Soudal–Quick-Step	4h 16' 59"
2	Jasper Philipsen (BEL)	Alpecin–Deceuninck	+ 0"
3	Dylan Groenewegen (NED)	Team Jayco–AlUla	+ 0"
4	Cees Bol (NED)	Astana Qazaqstan Team	+ 0"
5	Hugo Hofstetter (FRA)	Israel–Premier Tech	+ 0"
6	Søren Wærenskjold (NOR)	Uno-X Mobility	+ 0"
7	Sam Welsford (AUS)	Bora–Hansgrohe	+ 0"
8	Matteo Moschetti (ITA)	Q36.5 Pro Cycling Team	+ 0"
9	Madis Mihkels (EST)	Intermarché–Wanty	+ 0"
10	Matteo Trentin (ITA)	Tudor Pro Cycling Team	+ 0"
