= 2025 Brussels Cycling Classic =

2025 UCI ProSeries
- Event poster with previous winner Jonas Abrahamsen

Race details
- Dates: 8 June 2025
- Stages: 1
- Distance: 205.5 km (127.7 mi)
- Winning time: 4h 44' 43"

Results
| | Winner | Tim Merlier (BEL) | (Soudal–Quick-Step) |
| | Second | Alexis Renard (FRA) | (Cofidis) |
| | Third | Arnaud De Lie (BEL) | (Lotto) |

The 2025 Brussels Cycling Classic was the 105th edition of the Brussels Cycling Classic road cycling one day race. It was held on 8 June 2025 as part of the 2025 UCI ProSeries calendar.

== Teams ==
Nine UCI WorldTeams and fourteen UCI ProTeams made up the twenty-three teams that participated in the race.

UCI WorldTeams

- Alpecin–Deceuninck
- Arkéa–B&B Hotels
- Cofidis
- Groupama–FDJ
- Intermarché–Wanty
- Red Bull–Bora–Hansgrohe
- Soudal–Quick-Step
- Team Picnic PostNL
- XDS Astana Team

UCI ProTeams

- Caja Rural–Seguros RGA
- Equipo Kern Pharma
- Euskaltel–Euskadi
- Israel–Premier Tech
- Lotto
- Q36.5 Pro Cycling Team
- Team Flanders–Baloise
- Team Solution Tech–Vini Fantini
- Team TotalEnergies
- Tudor Pro Cycling Team
- Unibet Tietema Rockets
- Uno-X Mobility
- VF Group–Bardiani–CSF–Faizanè
- Wagner Bazin WB

== Result ==
Result
| Rank | Rider | Team | Time |
|---|---|---|---|
| 1 | Tim Merlier (BEL) | Soudal–Quick-Step | 4h 44' 43" |
| 2 | Alexis Renard (FRA) | Cofidis | + 0" |
| 3 | Arnaud De Lie (BEL) | Lotto | + 0" |
| 4 | Milan Menten (BEL) | Lotto | + 0" |
| 5 | Sandy Dujardin (FRA) | Team TotalEnergies | + 0" |
| 6 | Pavel Bittner (CZE) | Team Picnic PostNL | + 0" |
| 7 | Ethan Vernon (GBR) | Israel–Premier Tech | + 0" |
| 8 | Alexander Kristoff (NOR) | Uno-X Mobility | + 0" |
| 9 | Simon Dehairs (BEL) | Alpecin–Deceuninck | + 0" |
| 10 | Thibaud Gruel (FRA) | Groupama–FDJ | + 0" |
