= 2023 Nokere Koerse =

2023 UCI ProSeries

Race details
- Dates: 15 March 2023
- Stages: 1
- Distance: 193.6 km (120.3 mi)
- Winning time: 4h 19' 14"

Results
	Winner	Tim Merlier (BEL)	(Soudal–Quick-Step)
	Second	Edward Theuns (BEL)	(Trek–Segafredo)
	Third	Milan Menten (BEL)	(Lotto–Dstny)

The 2023 Danilith Nokere Koerse was the 77th edition of the Nokere Koerse one-day road cycling race. It was held on 15 March 2023 as a category 1.Pro race on the 2023 UCI ProSeries calendar.

== Teams ==
Ten of the 18 UCI WorldTeams, thiirteen UCI ProTeams, and one UCI Continental teams made up the 24 teams that participated in the race. Of those teams, 13 entered a full squad of seven riders, while the remaining seven teams entered six riders each; these teams were Cofidis, Human Powered Health, Israel–Premier Tech, Trek–Segafredo and Uno-X Pro Cycling Team. Of the 131 riders who were entered into the race, only 113 riders finished the race.

UCI WorldTeams

- Alpecin–Deceuninck
- Arkéa–Samsic
- Bora–Hansgrohe
- Cofidis
- Groupama–FDJ
- Intermarché–Circus–Wanty
- Lotto–Dstny
- Soudal–Quick-Step
- Team DSM
- Trek–Segafredo
- UAE Team Emirates

UCI ProTeams

- Bolton Equities Black Spoke
- Bingoal WB
- Euskaltel–Euskadi
- Green Project–Bardiani–CSF–Faizanè
- Human Powered Health
- Israel–Premier Tech
- Q36.5 Pro Cycling Team
- Team Flanders–Baloise
- Team Corratec
- Team Novo Nordisk
- Uno-X Pro Cycling Team

UCI Continental Teams

- Tarteletto–Isorex

== Result ==
Result (1–10)
Rank	Rider	Team	Time
1	Tim Merlier (BEL)	Soudal–Quick-Step	4h 19' 14"
2	Edward Theuns (BEL)	Trek–Segafredo	+ 0"
3	Milan Menten (BEL)	Lotto–Dstny	+ 0"
4	Timo Kielich (BEL)	Alpecin–Deceuninck	+ 0"
5	Lewis Askey (GBR)	Groupama–FDJ	+ 0"
6	Sep Vanmarcke (BEL)	Israel–Premier Tech	+ 0"
7	Louis Blouwe (BEL)	Bingoal WB	+ 0"
8	Laurence Pithie (NZL)	Groupama–FDJ	+ 0"
9	Christophe Noppe (BEL)	Cofidis	+ 0"
10	Sjoerd Bax (NED)	UAE Team Emirates	+ 0"
