= 2024 Nokere Koerse =

2024 UCI ProSeries

Race details
- Dates: 13 March 2024
- Stages: 1
- Distance: 188.1 km (116.9 mi)
- Winning time: 4h 21' 59"

Results
	Winner	Tim Merlier (BEL)	(Soudal–Quick-Step)
	Second	Fabio Jakobsen (NED)	(Team dsm–firmenich PostNL)
	Third	Jasper Philipsen (BEL)	(Alpecin–Deceuninck)

The 2024 Danilith Nokere Koerse was the 78th edition of the Nokere Koerse one-day road cycling race. It was held on 13 March 2024 as a category 1.Pro race on the 2024 UCI ProSeries calendar.

== Teams ==
Ten of the 18 UCI WorldTeams, nine UCI ProTeams, and one UCI Continental team made up the 20 teams that participated in the race. Of those teams, all entered a full squad of seven riders with the exception of Lidl–Trek entering six. Of the 138 riders who started the race, only 120 riders finished.

UCI WorldTeams

- Alpecin–Deceuninck
- Arkéa–B&B Hotels
- Cofidis
- Groupama–FDJ
- Ineos Grenadiers
- Intermarché–Wanty
- Soudal–Quick-Step
- Team dsm–firmenich PostNL
- Lidl–Trek
- UAE Team Emirates

UCI ProTeams

- Bingoal WB
- Euskaltel–Euskadi
- Israel–Premier Tech
- Lotto–Dstny
- Q36.5 Pro Cycling Team
- TDT–Unibet Cycling Team
- Team Flanders–Baloise
- Tudor Pro Cycling Team
- Uno-X Mobility

UCI Continental Teams

- Tarteletto–Isorex

== Result ==
Result (1–10)
Rank	Rider	Team	Time
1	Tim Merlier (BEL)	Soudal–Quick-Step	4h 21' 59"
2	Fabio Jakobsen (NED)	Team dsm–firmenich PostNL	+ 0"
3	Jasper Philipsen (BEL)	Alpecin–Deceuninck	+ 0"
4	Pascal Ackermann (GER)	Israel–Premier Tech	+ 0"
5	Simone Consonni (ITA)	Lidl–Trek	+ 0"
6	Tom Van Asbroeck (BEL)	Israel–Premier Tech	+ 0"
7	Maikel Zijlaard (NED)	Tudor Pro Cycling Team	+ 0"
8	Milan Menten (BEL)	Lotto–Dstny	+ 0"
9	Hugo Hofstetter (FRA)	Israel–Premier Tech	+ 4"
10	Pavel Bittner (CZE)	Team dsm–firmenich PostNL	+ 4"
