= Louis Blouwe =

Belgian cyclist

Personal information
- Born: 19 November 1999 (age 26) Izegem, Belgium
- Height: 1.82 m (6 ft 0 in)
- Weight: 71 kg (157 lb)

Cycling career
- Sport: Cycling
- Current team: Wagner Bazin WB
- Discipline: Road
- Role: Rider

Amateur teams
- 2016: Tieltse Rennersclub
- 2017: Forte Young Cycling Team VZW
- 2018–2020: EFC–L&R–Vulsteke

Professional teams
- 2021: Bingoal WB Development Team
- 2022–: Bingoal Pauwels Sauces WB

Louis Blouwe (born 19 November 1999) is a Belgian cyclist, who currently rides for UCI ProTeam Wagner Bazin WB.

His uncle Johan Bruyneel was also a professional cyclist.

== Major results ==
2021
1st Grote Prijs Stad Sint-Niklaas
L'Étoile d'Or

1st Points classification
1st Mountains classification

9th Overall Tour de la Mirabelle
2023
7th Nokere Koerse
2024
3rd Rund um Köln
10th Heistse Pijl
