= 2024 European Road Championships – Men's road race =

Men's elite road race
2024 European Road Championships

Race details
- Dates: 15 September
- Stages: 1
- Distance: 222.8 km (138.4 mi)
- Winning time: 4:37:09

Medalists
	Gold	Tim Merlier (BEL)
	Silver	Olav Kooij (NED)
	Bronze	Madis Mihkels (EST)

The men's elite road race at the 2024 European Road Championships took place on 15 September 2024, in Limburg, Belgium.

== Results ==
Rank	#	Cyclist	Nation	Time	Diff.
1st place, gold medalist(s)	19	Tim Merlier	Belgium	4:37:09	
2nd place, silver medalist(s)	4	Olav Kooij	Netherlands	s.t.	
3rd place, bronze medalist(s)	105	Madis Mihkels	Estonia	s.t.	
4	20	Jasper Philipsen	Belgium	s.t.	
5	61	Alexander Kristoff	Norway	s.t.	
6	39	Mads Pedersen	Denmark	s.t.	
7	77	Pavel Bittner	Czechia	s.t.	
8	87	Stanisław Aniołkowski	Poland	s.t.	
9	9	Christophe Laporte	France	s.t.	
10	98	Alex Kirsch	Luxembourg	s.t.	
11	11	Arnaud Démare	France	s.t.	
12	70	Max Walscheid	Germany	s.t.	
13	46	Jonathan Milan	Italy	s.t.	
14	109	Lukáš Kubiš	Slovakia	s.t.	
15	53	Fabian Lienhard	Switzerland	s.t.	
16	62	Søren Wærenskjold	Norway	s.t.	
17	50	Tom Bohli	Switzerland	s.t.	
18	31	Pau Miquel	Spain	s.t.	
19	6	Mike Teunissen	Netherlands	s.t.	
20	18	Jordi Meeus	Belgium	s.t.	
21	114	Oded Kogut	Israel	s.t.	
22	54	Simon Pellaud	Switzerland	s.t.	
23	113	Itamar Einhorn	Israel	s.t.	
24	82	Adam Ťoupalík	Czechia	s.t.	
25	104	Karl Patrick Lauk	Estonia	s.t.	
26	49	Stefan Bissegger	Switzerland	s.t.	
27	76	Emanuel Zangerle	Austria	s.t.	
28	37	Mathias Norsgaard	Denmark	s.t.	
29	44	Simone Consonni	Italy	s.t.	
30	1	Mathieu van der Poel	Netherlands	s.t.	
31	24	Bert Van Lerberghe	Belgium	s.t.	
32	23	Edward Theuns	Belgium	4:37:16	00:07
33	68	Jonas Rutsch	Germany	s.t.	
34	38	Søren Kragh Andersen	Denmark	s.t.	
35	22	Jonas Rickaert	Belgium	s.t.	
36	72	Rui Oliveira	Portugal	4:37:19	00:10
37	42	Davide Ballerini	Italy	s.t.	
38	12	Sandy Dujardin	France	s.t.	
39	66	Niklas Märkl	Germany	s.t.	
40	63	John Degenkolb	Germany	4:37:23	00:14
41	34	Kasper Asgreen	Denmark	s.t.	
42	91	Filip Maciejuk	Poland	4:37:33	00:24
43	67	Nils Politt	Germany	4:38:00	00:51
44	69	Jannik Steimle	Germany	4:38:09	01:00
45	48	Matteo Trentin	Italy	4:38:12	01:03
46	43	Mattia Cattaneo	Italy	4:38:35	01:26
47	3	Daan Hoole	Netherlands	4:38:40	01:31
48	15	Hugo Page	France	4:38:51	01:42
49	13	Mathis Le Berre	France	4:38:56	01:47
50	16	Adrien Petit	France	4:39:06	01:57
51	5	Oscar Riesebeek	Netherlands	4:39:19	02:10
52	2	Pascal Eenkhoorn	Netherlands	s.t.	
53	8	Danny van Poppel	Netherlands	s.t.	
54	41	Edoardo Affini	Italy	4:39:50	02:41
55	45	Mirco Maestri	Italy	4:40:31	03:22
56	60	Tord Gudmestad	Norway	4:44:29	07:20
57	58	Idar Andersen	Norway	4:44:31	07:22
58	108	Rait Ärm	Estonia	s.t.	
59	79	Dominik Neuman	Czechia	4:44:38	07:29
60	86	Mārtiņš Pluto	Latvia	s.t.	
61	47	Jacopo Mosca	Italy	s.t.	
62	110	Andrej Líška	Slovakia	s.t.	
63	7	Mick van Dijke	Netherlands	s.t.	
64	27	Fernando Barceló	Spain	s.t.	
65	14	Eddy Le Huitouze	France	s.t.	
66	17	Tim Declercq	Belgium	s.t.	
67	125	Rokas Kmieliauskas	Lithuania	s.t.	
68	90	Kamil Gradek	Poland	s.t.	
69	119	Jacob Eriksson	Sweden	s.t.	
70	75	Sebastian Schönberger	Austria	s.t.	
71	107	Norman Vahtra	Estonia	s.t.	
72	111	Pavol Rovder	Slovakia	s.t.	
73	92	Michał Paluta	Poland	s.t.	
74	40	Mads Würtz Schmidt	Denmark	s.t.	
75	26	Antonio Angulo	Spain	s.t.	
76	93	Szymon Sajnok	Poland	s.t.	
77	29	Kiko Galván	Spain	s.t.	
78	30	Raúl García Pierna	Spain	s.t.	
79	99	Arthur Kluckers	Luxembourg	s.t.	
DNF	10	Rémi Cavagna	France		
DNF	21	Laurenz Rex	Belgium		
DNF	25	Jon Aberasturi	Spain		
DNF	28	Xabier Berasategi	Spain		
DNF	32	Antonio Jesús Soto	Spain		
DNF	33	Tobias Lund Andresen	Denmark		
DNF	35	Mikkel Bjerg	Denmark		
DNF	36	Anders Foldager	Denmark		
DNF	51	Nils Brun	Switzerland		
DNF	52	Noah Bögli	Switzerland		
DNF	55	Matthias Reutimann	Switzerland		
DNF	56	Jan Sommer	Switzerland		
DNF	57	Jonas Abrahamsen	Norway		
DNF	59	Stian Fredheim	Norway		
DNF	64	Kim Heiduk	Germany		
DNF	65	Roger Kluge	Germany		
DNF	71	Ivo Oliveira	Portugal		
DNF	74	Felix Ritzinger	Austria		
DNF	81	Matěj Zahálka	Czechia		
DNF	83	Kristers Ansons	Latvia		
DNF	84	Alekss Krasts	Latvia		
DNF	88	Norbert Banaszek	Poland		
DNF	89	Marceli Bogusławski	Poland		
DNF	94	Erik Fetter	Hungary		
DNF	95	Ádám Karl	Hungary		
DNF	96	János Pelikán	Hungary		
DNF	97	Loïc Bettendorff	Luxembourg		
DNF	100	Charel Meyers	Luxembourg		
DNF	101	Tom Paquet	Luxembourg		
DNF	102	Tom Wirtgen	Luxembourg		
DNF	103	Siim Kiskonen	Estonia		
DNF	106	Markus Pajur	Estonia		
DNF	112	Matúš Štoček	Slovakia		
DNF	115	Guy Sagiv	Israel		
DNF	116	Rotem Tene	Israel		
DNF	117	Georgios Bouglas	Greece		
DNF	118	Andreas Miltiadis	Cyprus		
DNF	120	Burak Abay	Turkey		
DNF	121	Doğukan Arikan	Turkey		
DNF	122	Ahmet Örken	Turkey		
DNF	123	Tahir Yigit	Turkey		
DNF	124	Iustin-Ioan Văidian	Romania		
DNF	126	Martin Papanov	Bulgaria		
DNF	127	Emil Stoynev	Bulgaria		
DNF	128	Kristinn Jonsson	Iceland		
DNF	129	Lukas Sulaj Kloppenborg	Albania		
DNF	130	Olsian Velia	Albania		
DNF	131	Rien Schuurhuis	Vatican		
DNS	73	Iúri Leitão	Portugal		
DNS	130	Tomáš Kopecký	Czechia		
DNS	131	Simon Vaníček	Czechia		
