= 2025 Renewi Tour =

2025 UCI World Tour, race 30 of 36

Race details
- Dates: 20–24 August 2025
- Stages: 5
- Distance: 920.3 km (571.8 mi)
- Winning time: 19h 24' 42"

Results
Jersey awarded to the overall winner	Winner	Arnaud De Lie (BEL)	(Lotto)
	Second	Mathieu van der Poel (NED)	(Alpecin–Deceuninck)
	Third	Tim Wellens (BEL)	(UAE Team Emirates XRG)
Jersey awarded to the points classification winner	Points	Pavel Bittner (CZE)	(Team Picnic–PostNL)
Jersey awarded to the youth classification winner	Youth	Tibor Del Grosso (NED)	(Alpecin–Deceuninck)
Jersey awarded to the combativity classification winner	Combativity	Siebe Deweirdt (BEL)	(Team Flanders–Baloise)
	Team	(Belgium) Alpecin–Deceuninck	

The 2025 Renewi Tour was a road cycling stage race that took place in Belgium and the Netherlands. It started on 20 August 2025 and finished on 24 August 2025. It was the 20th edition of the Renewi Tour.

== Teams ==
All eighteen UCI WorldTeams and five UCI ProTeams teams participated in the race.

UCI WorldTeams

- Alpecin–Deceuninck
- Arkéa–B&B Hotels
- Cofidis
- Decathlon–AG2R La Mondiale
- EF Education–EasyPost
- Groupama–FDJ
- Ineos Grenadiers
- Intermarché–Wanty
- Lidl–Trek
- Movistar Team
- Red Bull–Bora–Hansgrohe
- Soudal–Quick-Step
- Team Bahrain Victorious
- Team Jayco–AlUla
- Team Picnic–PostNL
- UAE Team Emirates XRG
- Visma–Lease a Bike
- XDS Astana Team

UCI ProTeams

- Lotto
- Team Flanders–Baloise
- Tudor Pro Cycling Team
- Unibet Tietema Rockets
- Wagner Bazin WB

== Route ==
Stage characteristics and winners
Stage	Date	Course	Distance	Type	Stage winner
1	20 August	(Netherlands) Terneuzen to (Netherlands) Breskens	182.6 km (113.5 mi)	Flat stage	Tim Merlier (BEL)
2	21 August	(Belgium) Blankenberge to (Belgium) Ardooie	172.7 km (107.3 mi)	Flat stage	Olav Kooij (NED)
3	22 August	(Belgium) Aalter to (Belgium) Geraardsbergen	181.8 km (113.0 mi)	Hilly stage	Mathieu van der Poel (NED)
4	23 August	(Belgium) Riemst to (Belgium) Bilzen-Hoeselt	198.5 km (123.3 mi)	Hilly stage	Tim Merlier (BEL)
5	24 August	(Belgium) Leuven to (Belgium) Leuven	184.7 km (114.8 mi)	Hilly stage	Arnaud De Lie (BEL)
Total			920.3 km (571.8 mi)		

== Stages ==
=== Stage 1 ===
20 August 2025 – Terneuzen to Breskens, 182.6 km (113.5 mi)

Stage 1 Result
Rank	Rider	Team	Time
1	Tim Merlier (BEL)	Soudal–Quick-Step	3h 40' 05"
2	Arnaud De Lie (BEL)	Lotto	+ 0"
3	Juan Sebastián Molano (COL)	UAE Team Emirates XRG	+ 0"
4	Pavel Bittner (CZE)	Team Picnic–PostNL	+ 0"
5	Biniam Girmay (ERI)	Intermarché–Wanty	+ 0"
6	Ben Turner (GBR)	Ineos Grenadiers	+ 0"
7	Olav Kooij (NED)	Visma–Lease a Bike	+ 0"
8	Davide Ballerini (ITA)	XDS Astana Team	+ 0"
9	Fernando Gaviria (COL)	Movistar Team	+ 0"
10	Simon Dehairs (BEL)	Alpecin–Deceuninck	+ 0"

General classification after Stage 1
Rank	Rider	Team	Time
1	Tim Merlier (BEL)	Soudal–Quick-Step	3h 39' 55"
2	Rui Oliveira (POR)	UAE Team Emirates XRG	+ 2"
3	Dries De Bondt (BEL)	Decathlon–AG2R La Mondiale	+ 3"
4	Arnaud De Lie (BEL)	Lotto	+ 4"
5	Juan Sebastián Molano (COL)	UAE Team Emirates XRG	+ 6"
6	Jarrad Drizners (AUS)	Lotto	+ 7"
7	Pavel Bittner (CZE)	Team Picnic–PostNL	+ 10"
8	Biniam Girmay (ERI)	Intermarché–Wanty	+ 10"
9	Ben Turner (GBR)	Ineos Grenadiers	+ 10"
10	Olav Kooij (NED)	Visma–Lease a Bike	+ 10"

=== Stage 2 ===
21 August 2025 – Blankenberge to Ardooie, 172.7 km (107.3 mi)

Stage 2 Result
Rank	Rider	Team	Time
1	Olav Kooij (NED)	Visma–Lease a Bike	3h 35' 07"
2	Pavel Bittner (CZE)	Team Picnic–PostNL	+ 0"
3	Arvid de Kleijn (NED)	Tudor Pro Cycling Team	+ 0"
4	Biniam Girmay (ERI)	Intermarché–Wanty	+ 0"
5	Dylan Groenewegen (NED)	Team Jayco–AlUla	+ 0"
6	Tim Merlier (BEL)	Soudal–Quick-Step	+ 0"
7	Mike Teunissen (NED)	XDS Astana Team	+ 0"
8	Tord Gudmestad (NOR)	Decathlon–AG2R La Mondiale	+ 0"
9	Amaury Capiot (BEL)	Arkéa–B&B Hotels	+ 0"
10	Simon Dehairs (BEL)	Alpecin–Deceuninck	+ 0"

General classification after Stage 2
Rank	Rider	Team	Time
1	Tim Merlier (BEL)	Soudal–Quick-Step	7h 15' 02"
2	Olav Kooij (NED)	Visma–Lease a Bike	+ 0"
3	Dries De Bondt (BEL)	Decathlon–AG2R La Mondiale	+ 0"
4	Rui Oliveira (POR)	UAE Team Emirates XRG	+ 2"
5	Pavel Bittner (CZE)	Team Picnic–PostNL	+ 4"
6	Arnaud De Lie (BEL)	Lotto	+ 4"
7	Arvid de Kleijn (NED)	Tudor Pro Cycling Team	+ 6"
8	Juan Sebastián Molano (COL)	UAE Team Emirates XRG	+ 6"
9	Matej Mohorič (SLO)	Team Bahrain Victorious	+ 7"
10	Bastien Tronchon (FRA)	Decathlon–AG2R La Mondiale	+ 7"

=== Stage 3 ===
22 August 2025 – Aalter to Geraardsbergen, 181.8 km (113.0 mi)

Stage 3 Result
Rank	Rider	Team	Time
1	Mathieu van der Poel (NED)	Alpecin–Deceuninck	3h 50' 53"
2	Arnaud De Lie (BEL)	Lotto	+ 0"
3	Tim Wellens (BEL)	UAE Team Emirates XRG	+ 12"
4	Tibor Del Grosso (NED)	Alpecin–Deceuninck	+ 34"
5	Alberto Bettiol (ITA)	XDS Astana Team	+ 34"
6	Fred Wright (GBR)	Team Bahrain Victorious	+ 34"
7	Axel Laurance (FRA)	Ineos Grenadiers	+ 42"
8	Gianni Vermeersch (BEL)	Alpecin–Deceuninck	+ 42"
9	Pavel Bittner (CZE)	Team Picnic–PostNL	+ 42"
10	Olav Kooij (NED)	Visma–Lease a Bike	+ 42"

General classification after Stage 3
Rank	Rider	Team	Time
1	Arnaud De Lie (BEL)	Lotto	11h 05' 47"
2	Mathieu van der Poel (NED)	Alpecin–Deceuninck	+ 1"
3	Tim Wellens (BEL)	UAE Team Emirates XRG	+ 21"
4	Olav Kooij (NED)	Visma–Lease a Bike	+ 50"
5	Fred Wright (GBR)	Team Bahrain Victorious	+ 50"
6	Tibor Del Grosso (NED)	Alpecin–Deceuninck	+ 52"
7	Alberto Bettiol (ITA)	XDS Astana Team	+ 52"
8	Pavel Bittner (CZE)	Team Picnic–PostNL	+ 54"
9	Valentin Madouas (FRA)	Groupama–FDJ	+ 58"
10	Oliver Naesen (BEL)	Decathlon–AG2R La Mondiale	+ 59"

=== Stage 4 ===
23 August 2025 – Riemst to Bilzen-Hoeselt, 198.5 km (123.3 mi)

Stage 4 Result
Rank	Rider	Team	Time
1	Tim Merlier (BEL)	Soudal–Quick-Step	4h 19' 28"
2	Pavel Bittner (CZE)	Team Picnic–PostNL	+ 0"
3	Olav Kooij (NED)	Visma–Lease a Bike	+ 0"
4	Paul Penhoët (FRA)	Groupama–FDJ	+ 0"
5	Matevž Govekar (SLO)	Team Bahrain Victorious	+ 0"
6	Biniam Girmay (ERI)	Intermarché–Wanty	+ 0"
7	Axel Laurance (FRA)	Ineos Grenadiers	+ 0"
8	Simon Dehairs (BEL)	Alpecin–Deceuninck	+ 0"
9	Tord Gudmestad (NOR)	Decathlon–AG2R La Mondiale	+ 0"
10	Vincenzo Albanese (ITA)	EF Education–EasyPost	+ 0"

General classification after Stage 4
Rank	Rider	Team	Time
1	Arnaud De Lie (BEL)	Lotto	15h 25' 15"
2	Mathieu van der Poel (NED)	Alpecin–Deceuninck	+ 1"
3	Tim Wellens (BEL)	UAE Team Emirates XRG	+ 21"
4	Olav Kooij (NED)	Visma–Lease a Bike	+ 46"
5	Pavel Bittner (CZE)	Team Picnic–PostNL	+ 48"
6	Fred Wright (GBR)	Team Bahrain Victorious	+ 50"
7	Tibor Del Grosso (NED)	Alpecin–Deceuninck	+ 52"
8	Alberto Bettiol (ITA)	XDS Astana Team	+ 52"
9	Dries De Bondt (BEL)	Decathlon–AG2R La Mondiale	+ 52"
10	Valentin Madouas (FRA)	Groupama–FDJ	+ 58"

=== Stage 5 ===
24 August 2025 – Leuven to Leuven, 184.7 km (114.8 mi)

Stage 5 Result
Rank	Rider	Team	Time
1	Arnaud De Lie (BEL)	Lotto	3h 59' 38"
2	Mathieu van der Poel (NED)	Alpecin–Deceuninck	+ 0"
3	Dries De Bondt (BEL)	Decathlon–AG2R La Mondiale	+ 0"
4	Pavel Bittner (CZE)	Team Picnic–PostNL	+ 0"
5	Dylan Groenewegen (NED)	Team Jayco–AlUla	+ 0"
6	Lorenzo Milesi (ITA)	Movistar Team	+ 0"
7	Vincenzo Albanese (ITA)	EF Education–EasyPost	+ 0"
8	Paul Penhoët (FRA)	Groupama–FDJ	+ 0"
9	Olav Kooij (NED)	Visma–Lease a Bike	+ 0"
10	Axel Laurance (FRA)	Ineos Grenadiers	+ 0"

General classification after Stage 5
Rank	Rider	Team	Time
1	Arnaud De Lie (BEL)	Lotto	19h 24' 42"
2	Mathieu van der Poel (NED)	Alpecin–Deceuninck	+ 3"
3	Tim Wellens (BEL)	UAE Team Emirates XRG	+ 31"
4	Fred Wright (GBR)	Team Bahrain Victorious	+ 55"
5	Olav Kooij (NED)	Visma–Lease a Bike	+ 57"
6	Pavel Bittner (CZE)	Team Picnic–PostNL	+ 59"
7	Dries De Bondt (BEL)	Decathlon–AG2R La Mondiale	+ 59"
8	Alberto Bettiol (ITA)	XDS Astana Team	+ 1' 00"
9	Tibor Del Grosso (NED)	Alpecin–Deceuninck	+ 1' 03"
10	Toms Skujiņš (LAT)	Lidl–Trek	+ 1' 07"

== Classification leadership table ==
Classification leadership by stage
Stage	Winner	General classification	Points classification	Combativity classification	Young rider classification	Team classification
1	Tim Merlier	Tim Merlier	Tim Merlier	Siebe Deweirdt	Colby Simmons	Alpecin–Deceuninck
2	Olav Kooij	Tim Merlier	Tim Merlier	Siebe Deweirdt	Colby Simmons	Alpecin–Deceuninck
3	Mathieu van der Poel	Arnaud De Lie	Pavel Bittner	Siebe Deweirdt	Tibor Del Grosso	Alpecin–Deceuninck
4	Tim Merlier	Arnaud De Lie	Pavel Bittner	Ward Vanhoof	Tibor Del Grosso	Alpecin–Deceuninck
5	Arnaud De Lie	Arnaud De Lie	Pavel Bittner	Siebe Deweirdt	Tibor Del Grosso	Alpecin–Deceuninck
Final		Arnaud De Lie	Pavel Bittner	Siebe Deweirdt	Tibor Del Grosso	Alpecin–Deceuninck

== Classification standings ==
Legend
Denotes the winner of the general classification	Denotes the winner of the combativity classification
Denotes the winner of the points classification	Denotes the winner of the young rider classification

=== General classification ===
Final general classification (1–10)
Rank	Rider	Team	Time
1	Arnaud De Lie (BEL)	Lotto	19h 24' 42"
2	Mathieu van der Poel (NED)	Alpecin–Deceuninck	+ 3"
3	Tim Wellens (BEL)	UAE Team Emirates XRG	+ 31"
4	Fred Wright (GBR)	Team Bahrain Victorious	+ 55"
5	Olav Kooij (NED)	Visma–Lease a Bike	+ 57"
6	Pavel Bittner (CZE)	Team Picnic–PostNL	+ 59"
7	Dries De Bondt (BEL)	Decathlon–AG2R La Mondiale	+ 59"
8	Alberto Bettiol (ITA)	XDS Astana Team	+ 1' 00"
9	Tibor Del Grosso (NED)	Alpecin–Deceuninck	+ 1' 03"
10	Toms Skujiņš (LAT)	Lidl–Trek	+ 1' 07"

=== Points classification ===
Final points classification (1–10)
Rank	Rider	Team	Points
1	Pavel Bittner (CZE)	Team Picnic–PostNL	99
2	Olav Kooij (NED)	Visma–Lease a Bike	86
3	Arnaud De Lie (BEL)	Lotto	80
4	Tim Merlier (BEL)	Soudal–Quick-Step	75
5	Mathieu van der Poel (NED)	Alpecin–Deceuninck	55
6	Biniam Girmay (ERI)	Intermarché–Wanty	51
7	Axel Laurance (FRA)	Ineos Grenadiers	36
8	Dylan Groenewegen (NED)	Team Jayco–AlUla	34
9	Simon Dehairs (BEL)	Alpecin–Deceuninck	32
10	Paul Penhoët (FRA)	Groupama–FDJ	31

=== Combativity classification ===
Final combativity classification (1–10)
Rank	Rider	Team	Points
1	Siebe Deweirdt (BEL)	Team Flanders–Baloise	38
2	Ward Vanhoof (BEL)	Team Flanders–Baloise	29
3	Johan Jacobs (SUI)	Groupama–FDJ	22
4	Kenneth Van Rooy (BEL)	Wagner Bazin WB	21
5	Colby Simmons (USA)	EF Education–EasyPost	21
6	Dries De Bondt (BEL)	Decathlon–AG2R La Mondiale	20
7	Michel Ries (LUX)	Arkéa–B&B Hotels	19
8	Cériel Desal (BEL)	Wagner Bazin WB	18
9	Edoardo Affini (ITA)	Visma–Lease a Bike	17
10	Leander Van Hautegem (BEL)	Wagner Bazin WB	17

=== Young rider classification ===
Final young rider classification (1–10)
Rank	Rider	Team	Time
1	Tibor Del Grosso (NED)	Alpecin–Deceuninck	19h 25' 45"
2	Paul Magnier (FRA)	Soudal–Quick-Step	+ 8"
3	Pierre Gautherat (FRA)	Decathlon–AG2R La Mondiale	+ 34"
4	Michiel Lambrecht (BEL)	Wagner Bazin WB	+ 8' 27"
5	Milan Lanhove (BEL)	Team Flanders–Baloise	+ 9' 28"
6	Colby Simmons (USA)	EF Education–EasyPost	+ 10' 44"
7	António Morgado (POR)	UAE Team Emirates XRG	+ 19' 37"
8	Menno Huising (NED)	Visma–Lease a Bike	+ 24' 16"
9	Leander Van Hautegem (BEL)	Wagner Bazin WB	+ 30' 45"
10	Michael Leonard (CAN)	Ineos Grenadiers	+ 36' 24"

=== Team classification ===
Final team classification (1–10)
Rank	Team	Time
1	(Belgium) Alpecin–Deceuninck	58h 16' 49"
2	(Kazakhstan) XDS Astana Team	+ 42"
3	(United States) Lidl–Trek	+ 1' 05"
4	(France) Decathlon–AG2R La Mondiale	+ 1' 25"
5	(France) Groupama–FDJ	+ 2' 42"
6	(Netherlands) Team Picnic–PostNL	+ 5' 16"
7	(Belgium) Lotto	+ 5' 43"
8	(Netherlands) Visma–Lease a Bike	+ 7' 41"
9	(United Arab Emirates) UAE Team Emirates XRG	+ 7' 58"
10	(France) Cofidis	+ 8' 15"
