= 2026 Scheldeprijs =

Cycling race

2026 UCI ProSeries
- Event poster with previous winners Tim Merlier and Elisa Balsamo

Race details
- Dates: 8 April 2026
- Stages: 1
- Distance: 205 km (127 mi)
- Winning time: 4h 25' 01"

Results
	Winner	Tim Merlier (BEL)	(Soudal–Quick-Step)
	Second	Pavel Bittner (CZE)	(Team Picnic–PostNL)
	Third	Emilien Jeannière (FRA)	(Team TotalEnergies)

The 2026 Scheldeprijs was a road cycling one-day race that was held on 8 April in the Netherlands and Belgium. It was the 114th edition of the Scheldeprijs, and categorized as a 1.Pro event on the 2026 UCI ProSeries calendar.

== Teams ==
Nine of the eighteen UCI WorldTeams, nine UCI ProTeams, and two UCI Continental teams make up the twenty teams that participated in the race.

UCI WorldTeams

- Alpecin–Premier Tech
- Lotto–Intermarché
- Lidl–Trek
- NSN Cycling Team
- Red Bull–Bora–Hansgrohe
- Soudal–Quick-Step
- Team Bahrain Victorious
- Team Jayco–AlUla
- Team Picnic–PostNL

UCI ProTeams

- Burgos Burpellet BH
- Cofidis
- Modern Adventure Pro Cycling
- Pinarello–Q36.5 Pro Cycling Team
- Solution Tech NIPPO Rali
- Team Flanders–Baloise
- Team TotalEnergies
- Tudor Pro Cycling Team
- Unibet Rose Rockets

UCI Continental Teams

- BEAT CC p/b Saxo
- Tarteletto–Isorex

== Result ==
Result
Rank	Rider	Team	Time
1	Tim Merlier (BEL)	Soudal–Quick-Step	4h 25' 01"
2	Pavel Bittner (CZE)	Team Picnic–PostNL	+ 0"
3	Emilien Jeannière (FRA)	Team TotalEnergies	+ 0"
4	Dušan Rajović (SRB)	Solution Tech NIPPO Rali	+ 0"
5	Žak Eržen (SLO)	Team Bahrain Victorious	+ 0"
6	Hugo Hofstetter (FRA)	NSN Cycling Team	+ 0"
7	David Dekker (NED)	BEAT CC p/b Saxo	+ 0"
8	Jasper Philipsen (BEL)	Alpecin–Premier Tech	+ 0"
9	Steffen De Schuyteneer (BEL)	Lotto–Intermarché	+ 0"
10	Tom Crabbe (BEL)	Team Flanders–Baloise	+ 0"
