= Romain Seigle =

French cyclist

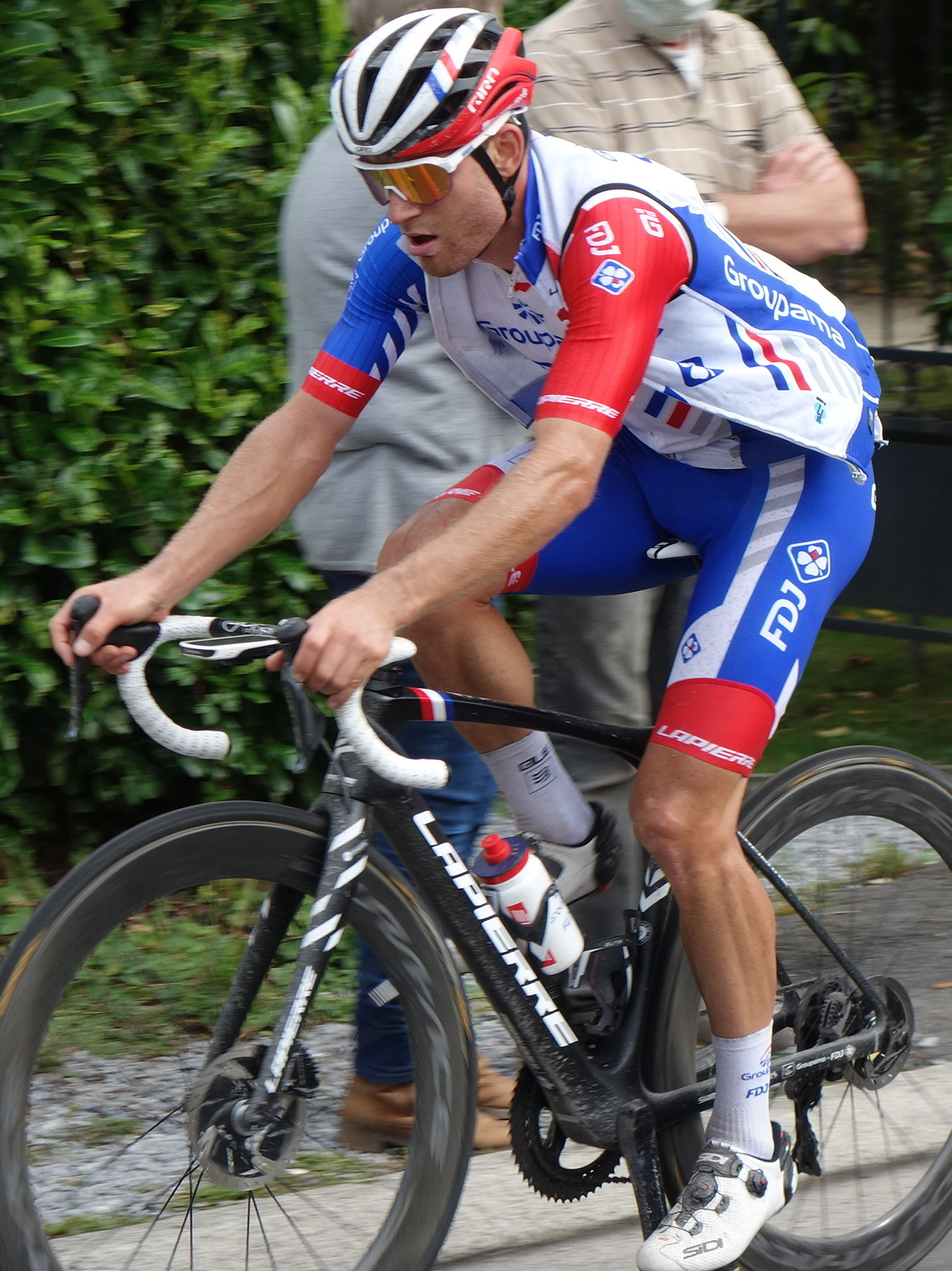

Personal information
- Born: 11 October 1994 (age 32) Vienne, Isère, France
- Height: 1.69 m (5 ft 7 in)
- Weight: 63 kg (139 lb)

Cycling career
- Sport: Cycling
- Disciplines: Road; Cyclo-cross (former); Mountain bike (former)
- Role: Rider
- Rider type: Puncheur; Climber

Amateur teams
- 2011–2014: CVAC Vienne
- 2015: AC Bisontine
- 2016–2017: CC Étupes

Professional teams
- 2017: FDJ (stagiaire)
- 2018–2021: FDJ

Romain Seigle (born 11 October 1994 in Vienne, Isère) is a French cyclist, who last rode for UCI WorldTeam Groupama–FDJ. In August 2019, he was named in the startlist for the 2019 Vuelta a España.

== Major results ==
=== Road ===
2017
3rd Overall Circuit des Ardennes
10th Overall Tour des Pays de Savoie
2018
2nd Overall Boucles de la Mayenne
2020
8th Brussels Cycling Classic

==== Grand Tour general classification results timeline ====
Grand Tour	2019	2020	2021
Giro d'Italia	—	—	88
Tour de France	—	—	—
Vuelta a España	80	DNF	—

Legend
—	Did not compete
DNF	Did not finish

=== Cyclo-cross ===
2011–2012
2nd National Junior Championships
3rd Overall UCI Junior World Cup
3rd UEC European Junior Championships
2014–2015
2nd Overall Coupe de France de cyclo-cross Under-23

1st Cyclo-cross du Mingant

=== Mountain bike ===
2012
1st European Junior XCO Championships
2015
3rd National Under-23 XCO Championships
