= 2020 Brussels Cycling Classic =

2020 UCI Europe Tour 2020 UCI ProSeries
- Event poster with previous winner Caleb Ewan

Race details
- Dates: 30 August 2020
- Stages: 1
- Distance: 203.7 km (126.6 mi)
- Winning time: 4h 48' 39"

Results
	Winner	Tim Merlier (BEL)	(Alpecin–Fenix)
	Second	Davide Ballerini (ITA)	(Deceuninck–Quick-Step)
	Third	Nacer Bouhanni (FRA)	(Arkéa–Samsic)

The 2020 Brussels Cycling Classic was the 100th edition of the Brussels Cycling Classic road cycling one day race. It was held on 30 August 2020 as a 1.Pro event as part of the 2020 UCI Europe Tour and the 2020 UCI ProSeries.

== Teams ==
Eight UCI WorldTeams, ten UCI ProTeams, and two UCI Continental teams made up the twenty teams that participated in the race. Most teams entered seven riders; however, Arkéa–Samsic and Deceuninck–Quick-Step entered six each, while AG2R La Mondiale and Nippo–Delko–One Provence entered five each. Of the 134 riders who started the race, only 112 riders finished.

UCI WorldTeams

- AG2R La Mondiale
- Bora–Hansgrohe
- Cofidis
- Deceuninck–Quick-Step
- Groupama–FDJ
- Lotto–Soudal
- Team Sunweb
- UAE Team Emirates

UCI ProTeams

- Alpecin–Fenix
- Arkéa–Samsic
- Bingoal–Wallonie Bruxelles
- Burgos BH
- Circus–Wanty Gobert
- Nippo–Delko–One Provence
- Riwal Securitas
- Sport Vlaanderen–Baloise
- Total Direct Énergie
- Vini Zabù–KTM

UCI Continental Teams

- BEAT Cycling Club
- Tarteletto–Isorex

== Results ==
Result
Rank	Rider	Team	Time
1	Tim Merlier (BEL)	Alpecin–Fenix	4h 48' 39"
2	Davide Ballerini (ITA)	Deceuninck–Quick-Step	+ 0"
3	Nacer Bouhanni (FRA)	Arkéa–Samsic	+ 0"
4	Florian Vermeersch (BEL)	Lotto–Soudal	+ 0"
5	Jasper Philipsen (BEL)	UAE Team Emirates	+ 0"
6	Pascal Ackermann (GER)	Bora–Hansgrohe	+ 0"
7	Lawrence Naesen (BEL)	AG2R La Mondiale	+ 0"
8	Romain Seigle (FRA)	Groupama–FDJ	+ 0"
9	Amaury Capiot (BEL)	Sport Vlaanderen–Baloise	+ 0"
10	Edward Planckaert (BEL)	Sport Vlaanderen–Baloise	+ 0"
