= Pavel Bittner =

Czech cyclist

- Bittner in 2026

Personal information
- Born: 29 October 2002 (age 23) Olomouc, Czech Republic
- Height: 1.84 m (6 ft 0 in)
- Weight: 73 kg (161 lb)

Cycling career
- Sport: Cycling
- Current team: Team Picnic–PostNL
- Disciplines: Road; Cyclo-cross
- Role: Rider
- Rider type: Sprinter; Classics specialist

Amateur team
- 2019: Team Mapei Merida Kaňkovský

Professional teams
- 2021–2022: Development Team DSM
- 2022–2026: Team DSM

Major wins
- Grand Tours Vuelta a España 1 individual stage (2024)
Medal record
Road cycling
Representing Czech Republic
European Junior Road Championships
Silver medal – second place	2020 Plouay	Road race

Pavel Bittner (born 29 October 2002) is a Czech cyclist, who currently rides for UCI WorldTeam Team Picnic–PostNL.

Bittner turned professional in August 2022 with Team DSM. In August 2024, he took his first pro win on the opening stage of the Vuelta a Burgos, going on to win stage five and the points classification as well. Later that month, he won the fifth stage of the Vuelta a España in a photo finish with Wout Van Aert.

== Major results ==
2019
National Junior Road Championships

1st Road race
2nd Time trial

7th Overall Saarland Trofeo

1st Stages 3a & 4

2020
National Junior Road Championships

1st Road race
2nd Time trial

UEC European Junior Road Championships

2nd Road race
7th Time trial

2021
1st Stage 1 Course de la Paix Grand Prix Jeseníky
3rd Overall Orlen Nations Grand Prix
2022
5th Road race, National Under-23 Road Championships
5th Ronde van Overijssel
6th Road race, UCI Road World Under-23 Championships
8th Road race, UEC European Under-23 Road Championships
9th Rund um Köln
2023
2nd Road race, National Road Championships
2024 (3 pro wins)
Vuelta a Burgos

1st Points classification
1st Stages 1 & 5

1st Stage 5 Vuelta a España
2nd Grand Prix Criquielion
7th Road race, UEC European Road Championships
10th Nokere Koerse
2025
2nd Grand Prix de Fourmies
3rd Münsterland Giro
5th Road race, National Road Championships
5th Gooikse Pijl
6th Overall Renewi Tour

1st Points classification

7th Rund um Köln
8th Kuurne–Brussels–Kuurne
9th Scheldeprijs
2026 (1)
1st Paris–Chauny
2nd Scheldeprijs
3rd Bredene Koksijde Classic
4th Grand Prix de Fourmies
6th Tour of Bruges

=== Grand tour general classification results timeline ===
Grand Tour	2024	2025	2026
Giro d'Italia	—	—	—
Tour de France	—	133	140
Vuelta a España	115	—	—

Legend
—	Did not compete
DNF	Did not finish
