= 2025 Scheldeprijs =

Cycling race

2025 UCI ProSeries
- Event poster with previous winners Tim Merlier and Lorena Wiebes

Race details
- Dates: 9 April 2025
- Stages: 1
- Distance: 202.8 km (126.0 mi)
- Winning time: 4h 13' 15"

Results
	Winner	Tim Merlier (BEL)	(Soudal–Quick-Step)
	Second	Jasper Philipsen (BEL)	(Alpecin–Deceuninck)
	Third	Matteo Moschetti (ITA)	(Q36.5 Pro Cycling Team)

The 2025 Scheldeprijs was a road cycling one-day race held on 9 April in the Netherlands. It was the 113th edition of the Scheldeprijs, and categorized as a 1.Pro event on the 2025 UCI ProSeries calendar. The race course was 202.8 kilometres (126.0 mi) long, starting in the city of Terneuzen and finishing in Schoten on the outskirts of Antwerp.

The race was won by Tim Merlier, who narrowly beat Jasper Philipsen in a sprint finish. It was Merlier's second consecutive victory at the race.

== Teams ==
Nine of the eighteen UCI WorldTeams, eleven UCI ProTeams, and two UCI Continental teams made up the twenty-two teams that participated in the race.

UCI WorldTeams

- Alpecin–Deceuninck
- Cofidis
- Intermarché–Wanty
- Lidl–Trek
- Red Bull–Bora–Hansgrohe
- Soudal–Quick-Step
- Team Jayco–AlUla
- Team dsm–firmenich PostNL
- XDS Astana Team

UCI ProTeams

- Equipo Kern Pharma
- Israel–Premier Tech
- Lotto
- Q36.5 Pro Cycling Team
- Team Solution Tech–Vini Fantini
- Team Flanders–Baloise
- Team TotalEnergies
- Tudor Pro Cycling Team
- Unibet Tietema Rockets
- Uno-X Mobility
- Wagner Bazin WB

UCI Continental Teams

- BEAT Cycling Club
- Tarteletto–Isorex

== Result ==
Result
Rank	Rider	Team	Time
1	Tim Merlier (BEL)	Soudal–Quick-Step	4h 13' 15"
2	Jasper Philipsen (BEL)	Alpecin–Deceuninck	+ 0"
3	Matteo Moschetti (ITA)	Q36.5 Pro Cycling Team	+ 0"
4	Milan Fretin (BEL)	Cofidis	+ 0"
5	Danny van Poppel (NED)	Red Bull–Bora–Hansgrohe	+ 0"
6	Stanisław Aniołkowski (POL)	Cofidis	+ 0"
7	Max Kanter (GER)	XDS Astana Team	+ 0"
8	Alexander Kristoff (NOR)	Uno-X Mobility	+ 0"
9	Pavel Bittner (CZE)	Team Picnic PostNL	+ 0"
10	Sasha Weemaes (BEL)	Wagner Bazin WB	+ 0"
