= Grote Prijs Jean-Pierre Monseré =

Belgium cycling race

Race details
- Date: July
- Region: Belgium
- Discipline: Road
- Competition: UCI Europe Tour
- Type: One-day
- Web site: gpmonsere.be

History
- First edition: 2012
- Editions: 14 (as of 2026)
- First winner: Frédéric Amorison (BEL)
- Most wins: No repeat winners
- Most recent: Dylan Groenewegen (NED)

The Grote Prijs Jean-Pierre Monseré is a one-day cycling race held annually in Belgium, named after Jean-Pierre Monseré. It is part of UCI Europe Tour in category 1.1.

== Winners ==
Year	Country	Rider	Team
2012	Belgium	Frédéric Amorison	Landbouwkrediet–Euphony
2013	Belgium	Tom Van Asbroeck	Topsport Vlaanderen–Baloise
2014	Belgium	Guillaume Van Keirsbulck	Omega Pharma–Quick-Step
2015	Belgium	Jürgen Roelandts	Lotto–Soudal
2016	Netherlands	Lars Boom	Astana
2017	Belgium	Laurens Sweeck	ERA–Circus
2018	Netherlands	André Looij	Monkey Town Continental Team
2019	No race due to storm		
2020	Netherlands	Fabio Jakobsen	Deceuninck–Quick-Step
2021	Belgium	Tim Merlier	Alpecin–Fenix
2022	Belgium	Arnaud De Lie	Lotto–Soudal
2023	Belgium	Gerben Thijssen	Intermarché–Circus–Wanty
2024	Belgium	Jarne Van de Paar	Lotto–Dstny
2025	France	Alexys Brunel	Team TotalEnergies
2026	Netherlands	Dylan Groenewegen	Unibet Rose Rockets
