= 2021 Grote Prijs Jean-Pierre Monseré =

- 2021 UCI Europe Tour

Race details
- Dates: 7 March 2021
- Distance: 202.1 km (125.6 mi)
- Winning time: 4h 34' 44"

Results
	Winner	Tim Merlier (BEL)	(Alpecin–Fenix)
	Second	Mark Cavendish (GBR)	(Deceuninck–Quick-Step)
	Third	Timothy Dupont (BEL)	(Bingoal WB)

The 2021 Grote Prijs Jean-Pierre Monseré was the 9th edition of the Grote Prijs Jean-Pierre Monseré road cycling one-day race in Belgium. It was a 1.1-rated event on the 2021 UCI Europe Tour. The 202.1 kilometres (125.6 mi) long race started in Hooglede and finished in Roeselare. The race was won by Belgian cyclist Tim Merlier of the Alpecin–Fenix team.

== Teams ==
Five UCI WorldTeams, eight UCI ProTeams, and twelve UCI Continental teams made up the twenty-five teams that participated in the race. 145 of 168 riders finished the race.

UCI WorldTeams

- Cofidis
- Deceuninck–Quick-Step
- Intermarché–Wanty–Gobert Matériaux
- Lotto–Soudal
- Team Qhubeka Assos

UCI ProTeams

- Alpecin–Fenix
- Arkéa–Samsic
- B&B Hotels p/b KTM
- Bingoal WB
- Delko
- Sport Vlaanderen–Baloise
- Total Direct Énergie
- Uno-X Pro Cycling Team

UCI Continental Teams

- BEAT Cycling
- Canyon dhb SunGod
- Development Team DSM
- EvoPro Racing
- Groupama–FDJ Continental Team
- Lviv Cycling Team
- Metec–Solarwatt p/b Mantel
- Riwal Cycling Team
- SEG Racing Academy
- Tarteletto–Isorex
- Team SKS Sauerland NRW
- Xelliss–Roubaix–Lille Métropole

== Result ==
Result
Rank	Rider	Team	Time
1	Tim Merlier (BEL)	Alpecin–Fenix	4h 34' 44"
2	Mark Cavendish (GBR)	Deceuninck–Quick-Step	+ 0"
3	Timothy Dupont (BEL)	Bingoal WB	+ 0"
4	Pierre Barbier (FRA)	Delko	+ 0"
5	Riccardo Minali (ITA)	Intermarché–Wanty–Gobert Matériaux	+ 0"
6	Thomas Boudat (FRA)	Arkéa–Samsic	+ 0"
7	Jordi Warlop (BEL)	Sport Vlaanderen–Baloise	+ 0"
8	Emiel Vermeulen (BEL)	Xelliss–Roubaix–Lille Métropole	+ 0"
9	Arne Marit (BEL)	Sport Vlaanderen–Baloise	+ 0"
10	Rait Ärm (EST)	Groupama–FDJ Continental Team	+ 0"
