= 2021 Bredene Koksijde Classic =

2021 UCI Europe Tour 2021 UCI ProSeries

Race details
- Dates: 19 March 2021
- Stages: 1
- Distance: 199.2 km (123.8 mi)
- Winning time: 4h 12' 43"

Results
	Winner	Tim Merlier (BEL)	(Alpecin–Fenix)
	Second	Mads Pedersen (DEN)	(Trek–Segafredo)
	Third	Florian Sénéchal (FRA)	(Deceuninck–Quick-Step)

The 2021 Bredene Koksijde Classic was the 18th edition of the Bredene Koksijde Classic road cycling one day race, which was held on 19 March 2021, starting and finishing in the titular towns of Bredene and Koksijde, respectively. The 1.Pro-category race was initially scheduled to be a part of the inaugural edition of the UCI ProSeries, but after the 2020 edition was cancelled due to the COVID-19 pandemic, it made its UCI ProSeries debut in 2021, while also still being a part of the 2021 UCI Europe Tour.

The race was won in a sprint by Tim Merlier (Alpecin–Fenix) ahead of Mads Pedersen (Trek–Segafredo) and Florian Sénéchal (Deceuninck–Quick-Step).

== Teams ==
Twelve of the nineteen UCI WorldTeams, ten UCI ProTeams, and three UCI Continental teams made up the twenty-five teams that participated in the race. There were several teams that entered less than the maximum of seven riders: Bardiani–CSF–Faizanè, Cofidis, Ineos Grenadiers, Lotto–Soudal, Total Direct Énergie, and Trek–Segafredo each entered six, while Israel Start-Up Nation only entered five.

UCI WorldTeams

- Bora–Hansgrohe
- Cofidis
- Deceuninck–Quick-Step
- Groupama–FDJ
- Ineos Grenadiers
- Intermarché–Wanty–Gobert Matériaux
- Israel Start-Up Nation
- Lotto–Soudal
- Team DSM
- Team Qhubeka Assos
- Trek–Segafredo
- UAE Team Emirates

UCI ProTeams

- Alpecin–Fenix
- Arkéa–Samsic
- B&B Hotels p/b KTM
- Bardiani–CSF–Faizanè
- Bingoal WB
- Delko
- Sport Vlaanderen–Baloise
- Total Direct Énergie
- Uno-X Pro Cycling Team
- Vini Zabù

UCI Continental Teams

- BEAT Cycling
- Tarteletto–Isorex
- Xelliss–Roubaix–Lille Métropole

== Result ==
Result
Rank	Rider	Team	Time
1	Tim Merlier (BEL)	Alpecin–Fenix	4h 12' 43"
2	Mads Pedersen (DEN)	Trek–Segafredo	+ 0"
3	Florian Sénéchal (FRA)	Deceuninck–Quick-Step	+ 0"
4	Tom Van Asbroeck (BEL)	Israel Start-Up Nation	+ 0"
5	Eduard-Michael Grosu (ROU)	Delko	+ 0"
6	Stanisław Aniołkowski (POL)	Bingoal WB	+ 0"
7	Max Walscheid (GER)	Team Qhubeka Assos	+ 0"
8	Bram Welten (NED)	Arkéa–Samsic	+ 0"
9	Nils Politt (GER)	Bora–Hansgrohe	+ 0"
10	Cyril Lemoine (FRA)	B&B Hotels p/b KTM	+ 0"
