= 2022 Classic Brugge–De Panne =

Cycling race

2022 UCI World Tour, race 8 of 32

Race details
- Dates: 23 March 2022
- Stages: 1
- Distance: 203.9 km (126.7 mi)
- Winning time: 4h 45' 41"

Results
	Winner	Tim Merlier (BEL)	(Alpecin–Fenix)
	Second	Dylan Groenewegen (NED)	(Team BikeExchange–Jayco)
	Third	Nacer Bouhanni (FRA)	(Arkéa–Samsic)

The 2022 Classic Brugge–De Panne (known as Minerva Classic Brugge–De Panne for sponsorship reasons) was a road cycling one-day race that took place on 23 March 2022 in Belgium. It was the 46th edition of the Three Days of Bruges–De Panne, and the 8th event of the 2022 UCI World Tour.

== Teams ==
Twenty-four teams were invited to the race, including sixteen UCI WorldTeams and eight UCI ProTeams. All but four teams entered the maximum allowed seven riders. Of the 164 riders who were entered into the race, there were 154 finishers and five non-starters.

UCI WorldTeams

- Astana Qazaqstan Team
- Bora–Hansgrohe
- Cofidis
- Quick-Step Alpha Vinyl Team
- EF Education–EasyPost
- Groupama–FDJ
- Intermarché–Wanty–Gobert Matériaux
- Israel–Premier Tech
- Lotto–Soudal
- Movistar Team
- Team Bahrain Victorious
- Team BikeExchange–Jayco
- Team DSM
- Team Jumbo–Visma
- Trek–Segafredo
- UAE Team Emirates

UCI ProTeams

- Alpecin–Fenix
- Arkéa–Samsic
- B&B Hotels–KTM
- Bardiani–CSF–Faizanè
- Bingoal Pauwels Sauces WB
- Sport Vlaanderen–Baloise
- Team TotalEnergies
- Uno-X Pro Cycling Team

== Result ==
Result
Rank	Rider	Team	Time
1	Tim Merlier (BEL)	Alpecin–Fenix	4h 45' 41"
2	Dylan Groenewegen (NED)	Team BikeExchange–Jayco	+ 0"
3	Nacer Bouhanni (FRA)	Arkéa–Samsic	+ 0"
4	Max Walscheid (GER)	Cofidis	+ 0"
5	Olav Kooij (NED)	Team Jumbo–Visma	+ 0"
6	Arnaud Démare (FRA)	Groupama–FDJ	+ 0"
7	Simone Consonni (ITA)	Cofidis	+ 0"
8	Arnaud De Lie (BEL)	Lotto–Soudal	+ 0"
9	Jasper Stuyven (BEL)	Trek–Segafredo	+ 0"
10	Heinrich Haussler (AUS)	Team Bahrain Victorious	+ 0"
