= 2022 Nokere Koerse =

2022 UCI ProSeries

Race details
- Dates: 16 March 2022
- Stages: 1
- Distance: 189.8 km (117.9 mi)
- Winning time: 4h 20' 04"

Results
	Winner	Tim Merlier (BEL)	(Alpecin–Fenix)
	Second	Max Walscheid (GER)	(Cofidis)
	Third	Arnaud De Lie (BEL)	(Lotto–Soudal)
	Mountains	Andreas Goeman (BEL)	(Tarteletto–Isorex)

The 2022 Danilith Nokere Koerse was the 76th edition of the Nokere Koerse one-day road cycling race. It was held on 16 March 2022 as a category 1.Pro race on the 2022 UCI ProSeries calendar.

The race, held in the Belgian province of East Flanders, covered 189.8 kilometres (117.9 mi) and 1,171 metres (3,842 ft) of elevation, with 24.9 kilometres (15.5 mi) of cobbles. From the start in Deinze, for the first 78.5 kilometres (48.8 mi), the route travelled south and west before heading back north to the finish in Nokere. The race then entered the finishing circuit, which was 27.9 kilometres (17.3 mi) long and featured several cobblestone sections, and completed four laps before finishing atop the Nokereberg.

== Teams ==
Ten of the 18 UCI WorldTeams, eight UCI ProTeams, and two UCI Continental teams made up the 20 teams that participated in the race. Of those teams, 13 entered a full squad of seven riders, while the remaining seven teams entered six riders each; these teams were B&B Hotels–KTM, Bardiani–CSF–Faizanè, Cofidis, Human Powered Health, Intermarché–Wanty–Gobert Matériaux, Quick-Step Alpha Vinyl Team, and Trek–Segafredo. Of the 133 riders who were entered into the race, two did not start, while 18 did not finish; as a result, 113 riders finished the race.

UCI WorldTeams

- Bora–Hansgrohe
- Cofidis
- Groupama–FDJ
- Intermarché–Wanty–Gobert Matériaux
- Israel–Premier Tech
- Lotto–Soudal
- Quick-Step Alpha Vinyl Team
- Team DSM
- Trek–Segafredo
- UAE Team Emirates

UCI ProTeams

- Alpecin–Fenix
- Arkéa–Samsic
- B&B Hotels–KTM
- Bardiani–CSF–Faizanè
- Bingoal Pauwels Sauces WB
- Human Powered Health
- Sport Vlaanderen–Baloise
- Uno-X Pro Cycling Team

UCI Continental Teams

- Minerva Cycling Team
- Tarteletto–Isorex

== Result ==
Result (1–10)
Rank	Rider	Team	Time
1	Tim Merlier (BEL)	Alpecin–Fenix	4h 20' 04"
2	Max Walscheid (GER)	Cofidis	+ 0"
3	Arnaud De Lie (BEL)	Lotto–Soudal	+ 0"
4	Bert Van Lerberghe (BEL)	Quick-Step Alpha Vinyl Team	+ 0"
5	Bram Welten (NED)	Groupama–FDJ	+ 0"
6	Rasmus Tiller (NOR)	Uno-X Pro Cycling Team	+ 0"
7	Hugo Hofstetter (FRA)	Arkéa–Samsic	+ 0"
8	Pierre Barbier (FRA)	B&B Hotels–KTM	+ 0"
9	Pascal Ackermann (GER)	UAE Team Emirates	+ 0"
10	Jannik Steimle (GER)	Quick-Step Alpha Vinyl Team	+ 0"

Mountains classification (1–7)
Rank	Rider	Team	Points
1	Andreas Goeman (BEL)	Tarteletto–Isorex	10
2	Robin Carpenter (USA)	Human Powered Health	5
3	Casper van Uden (NED)	Team DSM	4
4	Sander Lemmens (BEL)	Tarteletto–Isorex	3
5	Lukas Pöstlberger (AUT)	Bora–Hansgrohe	3
6	Iljo Keisse (BEL)	Quick-Step Alpha Vinyl Team	1
7	Mathijs Paasschens (NED)	Bingoal Pauwels Sauces WB	1
