= Tim Merlier =

Belgian cyclist (born 1992)

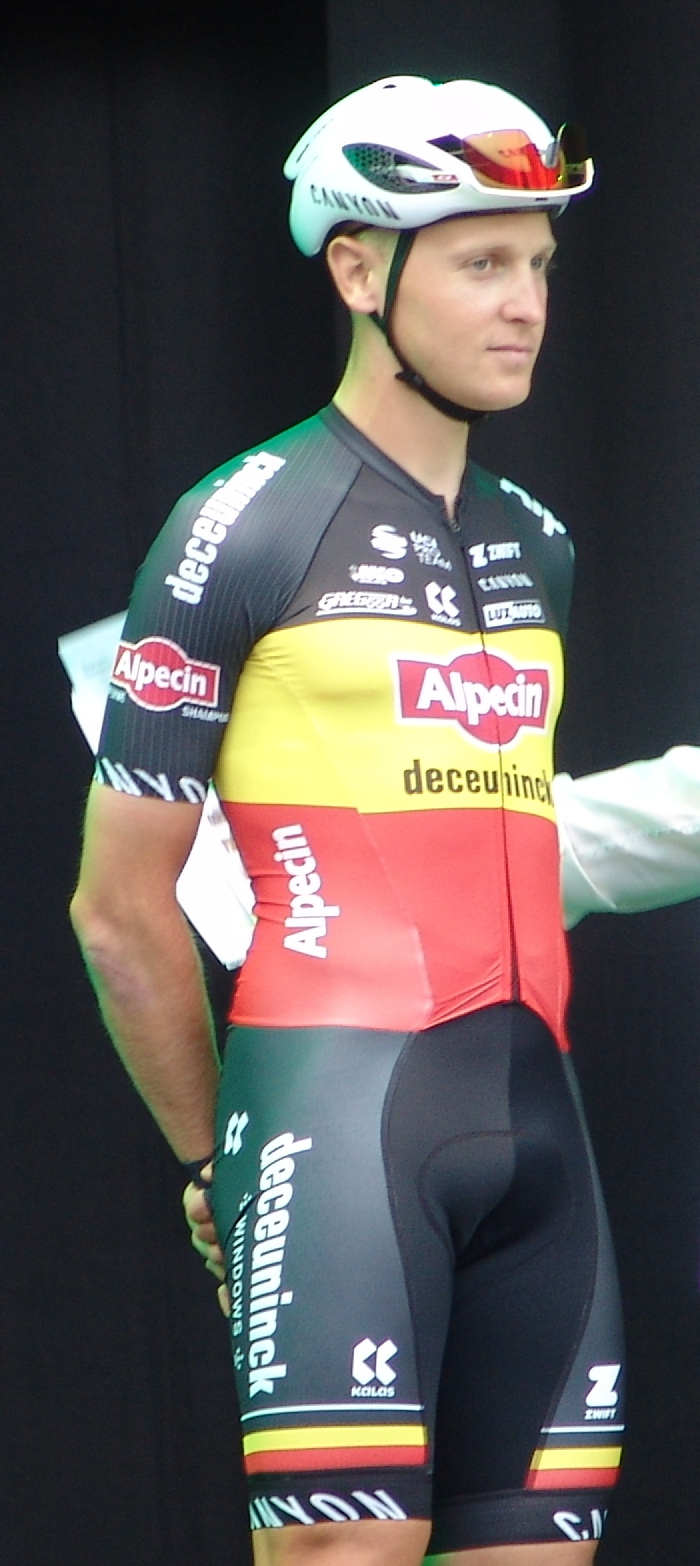
- Merlier in 2022 as Belgian national road race champion

Personal information
- Full name: Tim Merlier
- Born: 30 October 1992 (age 33) Kortrijk, Flanders, Belgium
- Height: 1.85 m (6 ft 1 in)
- Weight: 74 kg (163 lb)

Cycling career
- Sport: Cycling
- Current team: Soudal–Quick-Step
- Disciplines: Road; Cyclo-cross
- Role: Rider
- Rider type: Sprinter; Classics specialist

Professional teams
- 2011–2015: Sunweb–Revor
- 2015–2016: Vastgoedservice–Golden Palace
- 2017–2018: Vérandas Willems–Crelan (road)
- 2017–2018: Crelan–Charles (cyclo-cross)
- 2019: Pauwels Sauzen–Vastgoedservice (road)
- 2019–2020: Creafin–Tüv Süd (cyclo-cross)
- 2019–2022: Corendon–Circus
- 2023–: Soudal–Quick-Step

Major wins
- Grand Tours Tour de France 6 individual stages (2021, 2025, 2026) Giro d'Italia 4 individual stages (2021, 2024) One-day races and Classics European Road Race Championships (2024) National Road Race Championships (2019, 2022) Brussels Cycling Classic (2020, 2025) Classic Brugge–De Panne (2022) GP de Fourmies (2023) Bredene Koksijde Classic (2021) Nokere Koerse (2022, 2023, 2024) Scheldeprijs (2024, 2025, 2026)
Medal record
Representing Belgium
Men's road bicycle racing
European Championships
Gold medal – first place	2024 Limburg	Road race
Bronze medal – third place	2022 Munich	Road race
Men's gravel bicycle racing
European Championships
Silver medal – second place	2023 Oud-Heverlee	Elite

Tim Merlier (born 30 October 1992) is a Belgian cyclist who rides for UCI WorldTeam Soudal–Quick-Step.

One of the fastest sprinters in the world, Merlier has over 50 wins as a professional, including six stage wins at the Tour de France (2021, 2025–2026) and four at the Giro d'Italia (2021 and 2024). Merlier won the 2024 European Road Race Championship, and is a two-time winner of the Belgian National Road Race Championships, winning in 2019 and 2022.

Merlier also competes in cyclo-cross, having previously raced at the 2016 UCI Cyclo-cross World Championships in Heusden-Zolder.

== Career ==
=== Early years ===
Initially a cyclo-cross specialist, Merlier turned professional with Sunweb–Revor in 2011, after having been a national junior champion two seasons prior. With the team, he saw modest success on the under-23 level, winning a round of the 2012–13 Under-23 Bpost Bank Trophy, in addition to several podiums in high level races.

=== Road beginnings (2015–2018) ===
In 2015, he joined Vastgoedservice–Golden Palace, where he had his first notable result in a road race, placing third in Schaal Sels. The following year, he took his first pro road win at the Grote Prijs Stad Zottegem.

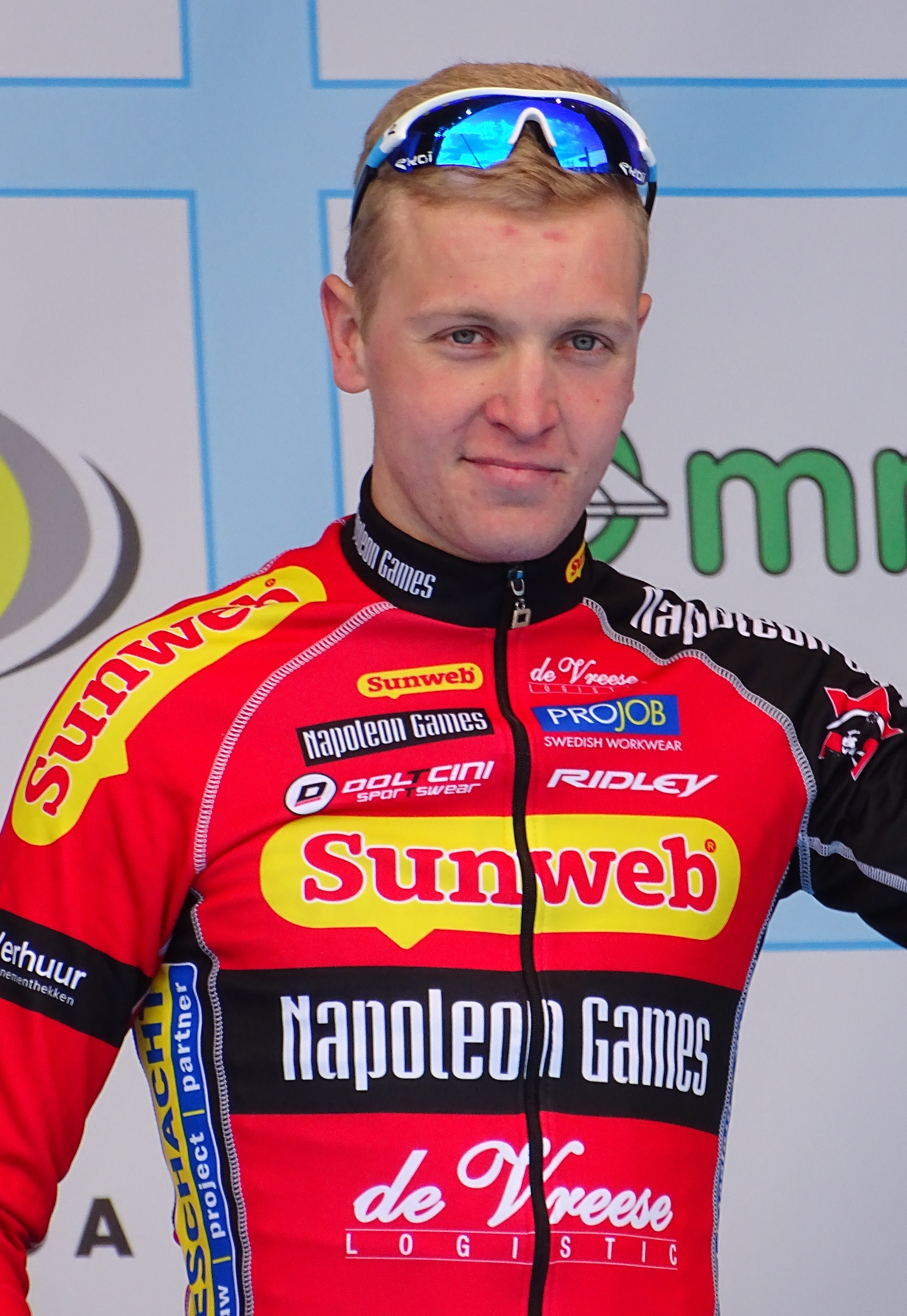
Merlier at the start of the 2015 E3 Harelbeke.

Following this win, he transferred to UCI Professional Continental team Vérandas Willems–Crelan for the 2017 season. In his second season with the team, he took two stage victories and the points classification at the Danmark Rundt.

=== Corendon–Circus (2019–2022) ===
From this point on, his road career started to take off, joining Pauwels Sauzen–Vastgoedservice in 2019. This year marked his most notable win yet: the Belgian national road race championship, in addition to another stage of the Danmark Rundt as well as the one-day Elfstedenronde. In 2020, he again had three wins, including his first UCI ProSeries event: the Brussels Cycling Classic, and his first win at the UCI WorldTour level, winning stage six of Tirreno–Adriatico, both in sprint finishes.

In 2021, Merlier took several victories in Belgian semi-classics, including the Bredene Koksijde Classic, Le Samyn, Grote Prijs Jean-Pierre Monseré, Ronde van Limburg and a second win of the Elfstedenronde. He also placed third in the Dwars door Vlaanderen. In May, he entered his first Grand Tour: the Giro d'Italia, where he won the second stage in a sprint ahead of Giacomo Nizzolo and Elia Viviani. In the process he took over the lead of the points classification, but dropped out after stage 10. In July, he took arguably the most important result of his career so far, winning stage three of the Tour de France, outsprinting Jasper Philipsen and Nacer Bouhanni.

Merlier had a strong start to 2022, winning the second stage of Tirreno–Adriatico in March, followed by the Nokere Koerse and Classic Brugge–De Panne later that month. In June, he was crowned that National Champion for a second time in a photo finish with Jordi Meeus. In August he won the bronze medal in the European Road Race Championships, and competed in his first Vuelta a España. He ended the year with a win at the Memorial Rik Van Steenbergen in October.

=== Soudal–Quick-Step (2023–) ===
In August 2022, Merlier signed a three-year contract with UCI WorldTeam Soudal–Quick-Step. Early into his first year with the team, he took several wins in the Middle East, including a stage of the Tour of Oman and two stages and the points classification of the UAE Tour. He maintained this momentum going into March with a stage win of Paris–Nice, and defending his title at Nokere Koerse ten days later. In August, he won two stages of the Tour de Pologne, followed by the Grand Prix de Fourmies a month later. In total, Merlier had 11 wins this season, his most successful to date.

Going into 2024, Merlier again showed strong form in the early season, taking two stages and the points classification of the AlUla Tour and three stages and the points classification of the UAE Tour. He placed second to Jasper Philipsen on stage two of Tirreno–Adriatico, but beat him at the Nokere Koerse, taking the race for a third consecutive year. He again was outsprinted by Philipsen a week later at the Classic Brugge–De Panne but rallied to win Scheldeprijs in early April. Merlier started the 2024 Giro d'Italia, his first Grand Tour since the 2022 Vuelta a España, where he won a bunch sprint ahead of Jonathan Milan on Stage 3 into Fossano, propelling himself into the maglia ciclamino. Merlier won again on stages 18 and 21, finishing third overall in the points classification. At the European Road Championships in September, Merlier won the elite men's road race, finishing ahead of Olav Kooij and his Belgian teammate Jasper Philipsen. Merlier finished the season with 16 wins, second only to Tadej Pogacar in the men's peloton.

At the start of the 2025 season, Merlier won stages 1 and 3 of the AlUla Tour. He then followed this up, with back to back stage wins in the UAE Tour, winning stages 5 and 6.

== Personal life ==
Merlier's brother, Braam, also formerly competed as a professional cyclist.

On February 1, 2023, Merlier and his girlfriend Cameron Vandenbroucke, daughter of former cyclist Frank Vandenbroucke, had a son, Jules.

== Major results ==
=== Cyclo-cross ===
2009–2010
1st National Junior Championships
1st Junior Bredene
Junior Superprestige

1st Vorselaar

2011–2012
Under-23 UCI World Cup

2nd Heusden-Zolder

Under-23 Superprestige

2nd Hoogstraten

2012–2013
1st Contern
Under-23 Bpost Bank Trophy

1st Lille

Under-23 Superprestige

3rd Hamme

2013–2014
2nd Under-23 Kalmthout
Under-23 Bpost Bank Trophy

3rd Loenhout

2014–2015
1st Illnau
1st Rhein-Neckar
3rd Zonnebeke
3rd Bredene
2015–2016
DVV Trophy

2nd Loenhout

Superprestige

3rd Gieten

2016–2017
Brico Cross

3rd Maldegem

2017–2018
Superprestige

2nd Middelkerke

DVV Trophy

2nd Lille

Brico Cross

3rd Maldegem

2019–2020
DVV Trophy

2nd Kortrijk
3rd Hamme

Ethias Cross

2nd Bredene

2nd Wachtebeke
2nd Otegem
2021–2022
Coupe de France

3rd Troyes II

2022–2023
Exact Cross

1st Zonnebeke

2nd Saint Sauveur de Landemont
2023–2024
Exact Cross

3rd Zonnebeke

=== Gravel ===
2023
2nd UEC European Championships
2nd National Championships
2024
UCI World Series

1st Blaavands Huk

=== Road ===
2015
3rd Schaal Sels
5th Omloop Het Nieuwsblad U23
2016 (1 pro win)
1st Grote Prijs Stad Zottegem
5th Ronde van Limburg
9th Halle–Ingooigem
9th Omloop Het Nieuwsblad U23
2017
3rd Schaal Sels
7th Dwars door het Hageland
2018 (2)
Danmark Rundt

1st Points classification
1st Stages 3 & 5

3rd Ronde van Limburg
5th Grote Prijs Marcel Kint
2019 (3)
1st Road race, National Championships
1st Elfstedenronde
Tour Alsace

1st Points classification
1st Prologue (TTT), Stages 1 & 4

1st Stage 5 Danmark Rundt
2nd Antwerp Port Epic
3rd Münsterland Giro
5th Memorial Rik Van Steenbergen
6th Dwars door het Hageland
6th Omloop Mandel-Leie-Schelde
7th Paris–Chauny
2020 (3)
1st Brussels Cycling Classic
1st Stage 6 Tirreno–Adriatico
1st Stage 4 Tour of Antalya
3rd Three Days of Bruges–De Panne
4th Scheldeprijs
5th Dwars door het Hageland
2021 (9)
1st Bredene Koksijde Classic
1st Le Samyn
1st Grote Prijs Jean-Pierre Monseré
1st Ronde van Limburg
1st Elfstedenronde
1st Stage 3 Tour de France
Giro d'Italia

1st Stage 2
Held after Stages 2–4 & 8–9

Benelux Tour

1st Stages 1 & 4

2nd Grote Prijs Marcel Kint
2nd Grand Prix d'Isbergues
3rd Dwars door Vlaanderen
3rd Antwerp Port Epic
7th Grote Prijs Jef Scherens
7th Brussels Cycling Classic
9th Dwars door het Hageland
2022 (5)
1st Road race, National Championships
1st Classic Brugge–De Panne
1st Nokere Koerse
1st Memorial Rik Van Steenbergen
1st Stage 2 Tirreno–Adriatico
3rd Road race, UEC European Championships
3rd Bredene Koksijde Classic
3rd Elfstedenronde
6th Gent–Wevelgem
6th Kampioenschap van Vlaanderen
7th Famenne Ardenne Classic
9th Scheldeprijs
10th Ronde van Limburg
2023 (11)
1st Grand Prix de Fourmies
1st Nokere Koerse
UAE Tour

1st Points classification
1st Stages 1, 2 (TTT) & 6

Okolo Slovenska

1st Points classification
1st Stages 2 & 4

Tour de Pologne

1st Stages 1 & 7

1st Stage 1 Paris–Nice
1st Stage 1 Tour of Oman
1st Stage 6 Four Days of Dunkirk
2nd Grote Prijs Marcel Kint
2nd Gullegem Koerse
4th Ronde van Limburg
8th Omloop van het Houtland
2024 (16)
1st Road race, UEC European Championships
1st Kampioenschap van Vlaanderen
1st Scheldeprijs
1st Nokere Koerse
1st Gooikse Pijl
Giro d'Italia

1st Stages 3, 18 & 21
Held after Stage 3

UAE Tour

1st Points classification
1st Stages 1, 4 & 6

AlUla Tour

1st Points classification
1st Stages 3 & 4

Tour of Belgium

1st Stages 2 & 5

1st Stage 5 Tour de Pologne
2nd Classic Brugge–De Panne
8th Gent–Wevelgem
2025 (16)
1st Scheldeprijs
1st Brussels Cycling Classic
1st Omloop van het Houtland
Tour de France

1st Stages 3 & 9

Paris–Nice

1st Stages 1 & 2

Renewi Tour

1st Stages 1 & 4

UAE Tour

1st Stages 5 & 6

AlUla Tour

1st Stages 1 & 3

Tour of Belgium

1st Stages 1 & 5

1st Stage 1 Tour of Holland
2nd Gent–Wevelgem
3rd Antwerp Port Epic
3rd Kampioenschap van Vlaanderen
2026 (13)
1st Kampioenschap van Vlaanderen
1st Scheldeprijs
1st Ronde van Limburg
1st Omloop van het Houtland
Tour de France

1st Stages 7, 8 & 12

Tour de Hongrie

1st Points classification
1st Stages 1, 3 & 5

1st Stage 1 Eneco Tour
1st Stage 2 Tour of Belgium
1st Stage 2 Tour of Britain

==== Grand Tour general classification results timeline ====
Grand Tour	2021	2022	2023	2024	2025	2026
Giro d'Italia	DNF	—	—	138	—	—
Tour de France	DNF	—	—	—	148	DNF
Vuelta a España	—	132	—	—	—	

==== Classics results timeline ====
Monument	2019	2020	2021	2022	2023	2024	2025	2026
Milan–San Remo	Has not contested during his career							
Tour of Flanders	—	—	—	—	43	65	—	—
Paris–Roubaix	—	NH	48	40	23	DNF	36	
Liège–Bastogne–Liège	Has not contested during his career							
Giro di Lombardia	Has not contested during his career							
Classic	2019	2020	2021	2022	2023	2024	2025	2026
Kuurne–Brussels–Kuurne	—	25	38	12	—	—	15	—
Brugge–De Panne	—	3	—	1	—	2	DNF	—
Gent–Wevelgem	—	27	34	6	14	8	2	—
Dwars door Vlaanderen	—	NH	3	—	DNF	—	53	—
Scheldeprijs	—	4	68	9	—	1	1	1
Brussels Cycling Classic	33	1	7	23	61	—	1	

==== Major championships timeline ====
Event		2015	2016	2017	2018	2019	2020	2021	2022	2023	2024	2025
World Championships	Road race	—	—	—	—	—	—	—	—	—	—	
European Championships	Road race	DNE	—	—	—	DNF	—	—	3	—	1	
National Championships	Road race	DNF	DNF	6	76	1	19	6	1	17	6	

Legend
—	Did not compete
DNF	Did not finish
