= Elfstedenronde =

Road cycling race in Belgium

Race details
- Date: June
- Region: Belgium
- English name: Tour of the 11 Cities
- Local name(s): Elfstedenronde (Dutch); Circuit des Onze Villes (French); Tour des Onze Villes (French)
- Discipline: Road
- Competition: UCI Europe Tour
- Type: One-day race
- Organiser: Golazo Sports
- Web site: www.sport.be/elfstedenronde/splash/

History
- First edition: 1943
- Editions: 42 (as of 2025)
- First winner: André Declerck (BEL)
- Most wins: Hilaire Couvreur (BEL); Marcel Rijckaert (BEL); Tim Merlier (BEL); (2 wins each)
- Most recent: Paul Magnier (FRA)

The Elfstedenronde is a one-day road cycling race held annually in Belgium. It was held originally from 1943 until 1989, and returned in 2017 as the Bruges Cycling Classic. The race has also been called the Tour des Onze Villes and the Circuit des Onze Villes. It is part of UCI Europe Tour in category 1.1.

== Winners ==
Year	Country	Rider	Team
1943	Belgium	André Declerck	
1944	No race		
1945	Belgium	André Maelbrancke	
1946	Belgium	Sylvain Grysolle	
1947	Belgium	Désiré Keteleer	
1948	Belgium	August Van Gaever	
1949	Belgium	Julien Ardijns	
1950	Belgium	Georges Desplenter	
1951	Belgium	Marcel Kint	Girardengo
1952	Belgium	Hilaire Couvreur	Terrot–Hutchinson
1953	Belgium	Marcel Rijckaert	Mercier–Hutchinson
1954	Belgium	Hilaire Couvreur	Girardengo–Eldorado
1955	Belgium	Karel De Baere	Mercier–BP–Hutchinson
1956	Belgium	Marcel Rijckaert	
1957	Belgium	André Noyelle	Bertin–The Dura
1958	Belgium	Gabriel Borra	Carpano
1959	Belgium	Maurice Meuleman	Peugeot–BP–Dunlop
1960	Netherlands	Joop Captein	Helyett–Leroux–Fynsec–Hutchinson
1961	Belgium	Rik Van Steenbergen	Solo–Van Steenbergen
1962	Belgium	Emile Severeyns	Solo–Van Steenbergen
1963	Netherlands	Peter Post	Dr. Mann–Labo
1964	Belgium	Leon Vandaele	Dr. Mann–Labo
1965	Belgium	Rik Van Looy	Solo–Superia
1966	Belgium	Arthur Decabooter	Wiel's–Gancia-Groene Leeuw
1967	Belgium	Guido Reybrouck	Roméo–Smith's
1968	Belgium	Roger Rosiers	Dr. Mann–Grundig
1969	Netherlands	Leo Duyndam	Caballero
1970	Belgium	Daniel Van Ryckeghem	Dr. Mann–Grundig
1971	Netherlands	Harry van Leeuwen	Flandria–Mars
1972	Belgium	Hubert Hutsebaut	Goldor–IJsboerke
1973	Belgium	Patrick Sercu	Brooklyn
1974	Belgium	Freddy Maertens	Carpenter–Confortluxe–Flandria
1975–1986	No race		
1987	Netherlands	Jos Lammertink	Transvemij–Van Schilt
1988	Belgium	Roger Ilegems	Sigma–Fina
1989	Belgium	Rudy Patry	Histor–Sigma–Fina
1990–2016	No race		
2017	Belgium	Wout van Aert	Vérandas Willems–Crelan
2018	Great Britain	Adam Blythe	Aqua Blue Sport
2019	Belgium	Tim Merlier	Pauwels Sauzen–Vastgoedservice
2020	No race due to the COVID-19 pandemic		
2021	Belgium	Tim Merlier	Alpecin–Fenix
2022	Netherlands	Fabio Jakobsen	Quick-Step Alpha Vinyl Team
2023	Belgium	Jasper Philipsen	Alpecin–Deceuninck
2024	Norway	Alexander Kristoff	Uno-X Mobility
2025	France	Paul Magnier	Soudal–Quick-Step
2026	No race		
