= David Francis (cyclist) =

American lawyer and former international cyclist

- Born: David Allan Francis; January 19, 1973 (age 53)
- Education: Brigham Young University (BA); California Western School of Law (JD)
- Occupations: lawyer, cyclist

David Allan Francis (born January 19, 1973) is an American lawyer and former cyclist.

== Education ==
Francis graduated from Dixie High School in St. George, Utah, earned a Bachelor of Arts in political science from Brigham Young University and a Juris Doctor from California Western School of Law.

== Cycling career ==
He is a former member of the United States Cycling Team (1989–1991) and was part of the next generation of American cyclists (after the success of Greg LeMond and Andrew Hampsten) to compete in professional cycling, a sport traditionally dominated by Europeans. He was originally coached by Bob Bills, but in 1990 USA Cycling Team Director Chris Carmichael hired former European professional rider, Rene Wenzel, to replace him. Francis traveled and raced internationally as a member of the United States Cycling Team for three years before leaving the team in 1991 to serve a two-year service mission for the Church of Jesus Christ of Latter-day Saints. Francis was a member of the United States Cycling Team from 1989 to 1991.

== Cycling achievements ==
- 1989-1991 US Cycling Team Member (Team USA)
- 1989 Junior Olympic Festival, Mexico City, Mexico - Gold Medal
- 1989 Tour of Pontivy, Brittany, France - 2nd Overall
- 1989 Tour of Pontivy, Individual Time Trial, Brittany, France - 2nd Place
- 1989 Mammoth Stage Race, Mammoth Lakes, CA - 2nd Overall
- 1989 U.S. Junior National Championships (Road Race) - 10th Place
- 1990 Glenwood Springs Professional Road Race, Glenwood Springs, CO - 10th Place
- 1990 Tour of the Future, Team Time Trial, Bisbee, AZ - 1st Place
- 1990 U.S. Junior National Championships (Road Race) - 2nd Place
- 1990 Utah State Time Trial Championships - 1st Place
- 2005 Southern Nevada/California Hill Climb Championships - 2nd Place
- 2006 Southern Nevada/California Hill Climb Championships - 1st Place
- 2007 LOTOJA Classic, Pro Division - 1st Place (Salt River Pass Record)
- 2008 LOTOJA Classic, Pro Division - 2nd Place
- 2009 High Uintah Classic, Evanston, Wyoming - 1st Place
- 2009 Sundance Hill Climb - 1st Place (New Record Time)
- 2009 Big Cottonwood Hill Climb - 1st Place
- 2009 Snowbird Hill Climb - 1st Place
- 2009 LOTOJA Classic, Pro Division - 2nd Place
- 2010 Intermountain Cup MTB, Jackson Hole Resort Pro Division - 1st Place
- 1987-2009 14 time LOTOJA Classic competitor

=== Personal life ===
Born in Salt Lake City and raised in Teton, Idaho, the son of an Australian immigrant, he is a dual citizen of Australia and the United States. Francis is father to four boys.

=== Legal career ===
Francis became interested in the law and becoming a lawyer after his older sister was killed in a motor vehicle accident when she was 19. The poor manner in which the insurance company dealt with Francis' family left an impression on Francis. After graduating from law school, he accepted a job with Mainor Harris Lawyers, working with Richard Harris, one of its founders. Francis later worked for Alverson Taylor and then Beckley Singleton, both large insurance defense firms in Las Vegas. While at Beckley Singleton, Francis practiced sports and entertainment law where he worked with The Ultimate Fighting Championship and Dana White directly. He founded the David Francis Law Firm, a civil trial law firm that specialized in personal injury law in Las Vegas, Nevada in 2007.
