= 2025 Paris–Nice =

Road cycling race in France

2025 UCI World Tour, race 6 of 36

Race details
- Dates: 9–16 March 2025
- Stages: 8
- Distance: 1,167.7 km (725.6 mi)
- Winning time: 26h 26' 42"

Results
Jersey awarded to the overall winner	Winner	Matteo Jorgenson (USA)	(Visma–Lease a Bike)
	Second	Florian Lipowitz (GER)	(Red Bull–Bora–Hansgrohe)
	Third	Thymen Arensman (NED)	(INEOS Grenadiers)
Jersey awarded to the points classification winner	Points	Mads Pedersen (DEN)	(Lidl–Trek)
Jersey awarded to the mountains classification winner	Mountains	Thomas Gachignard (FRA)	(Team TotalEnergies)
Jersey awarded to the young rider classification winner	Young rider	Florian Lipowitz (GER)	(Red Bull–Bora–Hansgrohe)
	Team	(United Kingdom) INEOS Grenadiers	

The 2025 Paris–Nice was a road cycling stage race which started on 9 March and finished on 16 March in France. It was the 83rd edition of Paris–Nice and the sixth race of the 2025 UCI World Tour.

== Teams ==
All eighteen UCI WorldTeams and four UCI ProTeams made up the 22 teams that participated in the race.

UCI WorldTeams

- Alpecin–Deceuninck
- Arkéa–B&B Hotels
- Cofidis
- Decathlon–AG2R La Mondiale
- EF Education–EasyPost
- Groupama–FDJ
- INEOS Grenadiers
- Intermarché–Wanty
- Lidl–Trek
- Movistar Team
- Red Bull–Bora–Hansgrohe
- Soudal–Quick-Step
- Team Bahrain Victorious
- Team Picnic–PostNL
- Team Jayco–AlUla
- UAE Team Emirates XRG
- Visma–Lease a Bike
- XDS Astana Team

UCI ProTeams

- Caja Rural–Seguros RGA
- Team TotalEnergies
- Tudor Pro Cycling Team
- Uno-X Mobility

== Route ==
Stage characteristics and winners
Stage	Date	Course	Distance	Type	Stage winner
1	9 March	Le Perray-en-Yvelines to Le Perray-en-Yvelines	156.5 km (97.2 mi)	Flat stage	Tim Merlier (BEL)
2	10 March	Montesson to Bellegarde	183.9 km (114.3 mi)	Flat stage	Tim Merlier (BEL)
3	11 March	Circuit de Nevers Magny-Cours to Nevers	28.4 km (17.6 mi)	Team time trial	Visma–Lease a Bike (NED)
4	12 March	Vichy to La Loge des Gardes	163.4 km (101.5 mi)	Mountain stage	João Almeida (POR)
5	13 March	Saint-Just-en-Chevalet to La Côte-Saint-André	196.5 km (122.1 mi)	Hilly stage	Lenny Martinez (FRA)
6	14 March	Saint-Julien-en-Saint-Alban to Berre l'Étang	209.8 km (130.4 mi)	Hilly stage	Mads Pedersen (DEN)
7	15 March	Nice to Auron	~~147.8 km (91.8 mi)~~ 109.3 km (67.9 mi)	Mountain stage	Michael Storer (AUS)
8	16 March	Nice to Nice	119.9 km (74.5 mi)	Medium mountain stage	Magnus Sheffield (USA)
Total			~~1,206.2 km (749.5 mi)~~ 1,167.7 km (725.6 mi)		

== Stages ==
=== Stage 1 ===
9 March 2025 — Le Perray-en-Yvelines to Le Perray-en-Yvelines, 156.5 km (97.2 mi)

Stage 1 Result (1–10)
Rank	Rider	Team	Time
1	Tim Merlier (BEL)	Soudal–Quick-Step	3h 32' 03"
2	Arnaud Démare (FRA)	Arkéa–B&B Hotels	+ 0"
3	Alberto Dainese (ITA)	Tudor Pro Cycling Team	+ 0"
4	Juan Sebastián Molano (COL)	UAE Team Emirates XRG	+ 0"
5	Axel Zingle (FRA)	Visma–Lease a Bike	+ 0"
6	Yevgeniy Fedorov (KAZ)	XDS Astana Team	+ 0"
7	Mick van Dijke (NED)	Red Bull–Bora–Hansgrohe	+ 0"
8	Timo Kielich (BEL)	Alpecin–Deceuninck	+ 0"
9	Vincenzo Albanese (ITA)	EF Education–EasyPost	+ 0"
10	Max Walscheid (GER)	Team Jayco–AlUla	+ 0"

General classification after Stage 1 (1–10)
Rank	Rider	Team	Time
1	Tim Merlier (BEL)	Soudal–Quick-Step	3h 31' 53"
2	Arnaud Démare (FRA)	Arkéa–B&B Hotels	+ 4"
3	Jhonatan Narváez (ECU)	UAE Team Emirates XRG	+ 4"
4	Alberto Dainese (ITA)	Tudor Pro Cycling Team	+ 6"
5	Matteo Jorgenson (USA)	Visma–Lease a Bike	+ 6"
6	Magnus Sheffield (USA)	INEOS Grenadiers	+ 8"
7	Juan Sebastián Molano (COL)	UAE Team Emirates XRG	+ 10"
8	Axel Zingle (FRA)	Visma–Lease a Bike	+ 10"
9	Yevgeniy Fedorov (KAZ)	XDS Astana Team	+ 10"
10	Mick van Dijke (NED)	Red Bull–Bora–Hansgrohe	+ 10"

=== Stage 2 ===
10 March 2025 – Montesson to Bellegarde, 183.9 km (114.3 mi)

Stage 2 Result (1-10)
Rank	Rider	Team	Time
1	Tim Merlier (BEL)	Soudal–Quick-Step	4h 11' 29"
2	Emilien Jeannière (FRA)	Team TotalEnergies	+ 0"
3	Mads Pedersen (DEN)	Lidl–Trek	+ 0"
4	Alexander Kristoff (NOR)	Uno-X Mobility	+ 0"
5	Timo Kielich (BEL)	Alpecin–Deceuninck	+ 0"
6	Axel Zingle (FRA)	Visma–Lease a Bike	+ 0"
7	Arnaud Démare (FRA)	Arkéa–B&B Hotels	+ 0"
8	Matevž Govekar (SLO)	Team Bahrain Victorious	+ 0"
9	Fabio Jakobsen (NED)	Team Picnic–PostNL	+ 0"
10	Cees Bol (NED)	XDS Astana Team	+ 0"

General classification after Stage 2 (1–10)
Rank	Rider	Team	Time
1	Tim Merlier (BEL)	Soudal–Quick-Step	7h 43' 12"
2	Arnaud Démare (FRA)	Arkéa–B&B Hotels	+ 14"
3	Emilien Jeannière (FRA)	Team TotalEnergies	+ 14"
4	Matteo Jorgenson (USA)	Visma–Lease a Bike	+ 14"
5	Jhonatan Narváez (ECU)	UAE Team Emirates XRG	+ 14"
6	Jonas Abrahamsen (NOR)	Uno-X Mobility	+ 14"
7	Mads Pedersen (DEN)	Lidl–Trek	+ 16"
8	Mick van Dijke (NED)	Red Bull–Bora–Hansgrohe	+ 16"
9	Alberto Dainese (ITA)	Tudor Pro Cycling Team	+ 16"
10	Magnus Sheffield (USA)	INEOS Grenadiers	+ 18"

=== Stage 3 ===
11 March 2025 – Circuit de Nevers Magny-Cours to Nevers, 28.4 km (17.6 mi) (TTT)

Stage 3 Result (1-10)
Rank	Team	Time
1	(Netherlands) Visma–Lease a Bike	30' 26"
2	(Australia) Team Jayco–AlUla	+ 15"
3	(Germany) Red Bull–Bora–Hansgrohe	+ 25"
4	(United States) Lidl–Trek	+ 30"
5	(United Kingdom) INEOS Grenadiers	+ 33"
6	(United States) EF Education–EasyPost	+ 34"
7	(France) Decathlon–AG2R La Mondiale	+ 39"
8	(United Arab Emirates) UAE Team Emirates XRG	+ 42"
9	(Spain) Movistar Team	+ 49"
10	(Belgium) Soudal–Quick-Step	+ 51"

General classification after Stage 3 (1–10)
Rank	Rider	Team	Time
1	Matteo Jorgenson (USA)	Visma–Lease a Bike	8h 13' 52"
2	Jonas Vingegaard (DEN)	Visma–Lease a Bike	+ 6"
3	Michael Matthews (AUS)	Team Jayco–AlUla	+ 21"
4	Ben O'Connor (AUS)	Team Jayco–AlUla	+ 21"
5	Aleksandr Vlasov	Red Bull–Bora–Hansgrohe	+ 31"
6	Florian Lipowitz (GER)	Red Bull–Bora–Hansgrohe	+ 31"
7	Mauro Schmid (SUI)	Team Jayco–AlUla	+ 31"
8	Ben Zwiehoff (GER)	Red Bull–Bora–Hansgrohe	+ 34"
9	Mattias Skjelmose (DEN)	Lidl–Trek	+ 36"
10	Magnus Sheffield (USA)	INEOS Grenadiers	+ 38"

=== Stage 4 ===
12 March 2025 – Vichy to La Loge des Gardes, 163.4 km (101.5 mi)

Stage 4 Result (1-10)
Rank	Rider	Team	Time
1	João Almeida (POR)	UAE Team Emirates XRG	3h 37' 06"
2	Jonas Vingegaard (DEN)	Visma–Lease a Bike	+ 1"
3	Mattias Skjelmose (DEN)	Lidl–Trek	+ 2"
4	Lenny Martinez (FRA)	Team Bahrain Victorious	+ 2"
5	Florian Lipowitz (GER)	Red Bull–Bora–Hansgrohe	+ 6"
6	Matteo Jorgenson (USA)	Visma–Lease a Bike	+ 6"
7	Brandon McNulty (USA)	UAE Team Emirates XRG	+ 9"
8	Harold Tejada (COL)	XDS Astana Team	+ 17"
9	Thymen Arensman (NED)	INEOS Grenadiers	+ 17"
10	Clément Champoussin (FRA)	XDS Astana Team	+ 21"

General classification after Stage 4 (1–10)
Rank	Rider	Team	Time
1	Jonas Vingegaard (DEN)	Visma–Lease a Bike	11h 50' 59"
2	Matteo Jorgenson (USA)	Visma–Lease a Bike	+ 5"
3	Mattias Skjelmose (DEN)	Lidl–Trek	+ 33"
4	Florian Lipowitz (GER)	Red Bull–Bora–Hansgrohe	+ 36"
5	João Almeida (POR)	UAE Team Emirates XRG	+ 37"
6	Thymen Arensman (NED)	INEOS Grenadiers	+ 56"
7	Brandon McNulty (USA)	UAE Team Emirates XRG	+ 58"
8	Tobias Foss (NOR)	INEOS Grenadiers	+ 1' 06"
9	Lenny Martinez (FRA)	Team Bahrain Victorious	+ 1' 09"
10	Pablo Castrillo (ESP)	Movistar Team	+ 1' 22"

=== Stage 5 ===
13 March 2025 – Saint-Just-en-Chevalet to La Côte-Saint-André, 196.5 km (122.1 mi)

Stage 5 Result (1-10)
Rank	Rider	Team	Time
1	Lenny Martinez (FRA)	Team Bahrain Victorious	4h 36' 23"
2	Clément Champoussin (FRA)	XDS Astana Team	+ 3"
3	Matteo Jorgenson (USA)	Visma–Lease a Bike	+ 3"
4	Harold Tejada (COL)	XDS Astana Team	+ 3"
5	Florian Lipowitz (GER)	Red Bull–Bora–Hansgrohe	+ 6"
6	João Almeida (POR)	UAE Team Emirates XRG	+ 7"
7	Brandon McNulty (USA)	UAE Team Emirates XRG	+ 11"
8	Ilan Van Wilder (BEL)	Soudal–Quick-Step	+ 16"
9	Magnus Sheffield (USA)	INEOS Grenadiers	+ 16"
10	Aurélien Paret-Peintre (FRA)	Decathlon–AG2R La Mondiale	+ 18"

General classification after Stage 5 (1–10)
Rank	Rider	Team	Time
1	Matteo Jorgenson (USA)	Visma–Lease a Bike	16h 27' 26"
2	Jonas Vingegaard (DEN)	Visma–Lease a Bike	+ 22"
3	Florian Lipowitz (GER)	Red Bull–Bora–Hansgrohe	+ 36"
4	João Almeida (POR)	UAE Team Emirates XRG	+ 40"
5	Lenny Martinez (FRA)	Team Bahrain Victorious	+ 55"
6	Mattias Skjelmose (DEN)	Lidl–Trek	+ 57"
7	Brandon McNulty (USA)	UAE Team Emirates XRG	+ 1' 05"
8	Thymen Arensman (NED)	INEOS Grenadiers	+ 1' 14"
9	Clément Champoussin (FRA)	XDS Astana Team	+ 1' 22"
10	Harold Tejada (COL)	XDS Astana Team	+ 1' 24"

=== Stage 6 ===
14 March 2025 – Saint-Julien-en-Saint-Alban to Berre l'Étang, 209.8 km (130.4 mi)

Stage 6 Result (1-10)
Rank	Rider	Team	Time
1	Mads Pedersen (DEN)	Lidl–Trek	4h 25' 37"
2	Joshua Tarling (GBR)	INEOS Grenadiers	+ 0"
3	Samuel Watson (GBR)	INEOS Grenadiers	+ 0"
4	Axel Zingle (FRA)	Visma–Lease a Bike	+ 0"
5	Matteo Sobrero (ITA)	Red Bull–Bora–Hansgrohe	+ 0"
6	Magnus Sheffield (USA)	INEOS Grenadiers	+ 0"
7	Mattias Skjelmose (DEN)	Lidl–Trek	+ 0"
8	Matteo Jorgenson (USA)	Visma–Lease a Bike	+ 0"
9	Maximilian Schachmann (GER)	Soudal–Quick-Step	+ 0"
10	Thymen Arensman (NED)	INEOS Grenadiers	+ 0"

General classification after Stage 6 (1–10)
Rank	Rider	Team	Time
1	Matteo Jorgenson (USA)	Visma–Lease a Bike	20h 52' 57"
2	Florian Lipowitz (GER)	Red Bull–Bora–Hansgrohe	+ 40"
3	Mattias Skjelmose (DEN)	Lidl–Trek	+ 59"
4	Thymen Arensman (NED)	INEOS Grenadiers	+ 1' 20"
5	João Almeida (POR)	UAE Team Emirates XRG	+ 2' 40"
6	Tobias Foss (NOR)	INEOS Grenadiers	+ 2' 47"
7	Magnus Sheffield (USA)	INEOS Grenadiers	+ 2' 54"
8	Brandon McNulty (USA)	UAE Team Emirates XRG	+ 3' 05"
9	Clément Champoussin (FRA)	XDS Astana Team	+ 3' 22"
10	Harold Tejada (COL)	XDS Astana Team	+ 3' 24"

=== Stage 7 ===
15 March 2025 – Nice to Auron, 109.3 km (67.9 mi)

Stage 7 Result (1-10)
Rank	Rider	Team	Time
1	Michael Storer (AUS)	Tudor Pro Cycling Team	2h 43' 31"
2	Mauro Schmid (SUI)	Team Jayco–AlUla	+ 20"
3	Georg Steinhauser (GER)	EF Education–EasyPost	+ 30"
4	Iván Romeo (ESP)	Movistar Team	+ 45"
5	Jordan Jegat (FRA)	Team TotalEnergies	+ 50"
6	Felix Gall (AUT)	Decathlon–AG2R La Mondiale	+ 57"
7	Lenny Martinez (FRA)	Team Bahrain Victorious	+ 1' 04"
8	Florian Lipowitz (GER)	Red Bull–Bora–Hansgrohe	+ 1' 11"
9	Clément Champoussin (FRA)	XDS Astana Team	+ 1' 14"
10	Mads Pedersen (DEN)	Lidl–Trek	+ 1' 14"

General classification after Stage 7 (1–10)
Rank	Rider	Team	Time
1	Matteo Jorgenson (USA)	Visma–Lease a Bike	23h 37' 42"
2	Florian Lipowitz (GER)	Red Bull–Bora–Hansgrohe	+ 37"
3	Thymen Arensman (NED)	INEOS Grenadiers	+ 1' 20"
4	Michael Storer (AUS)	Tudor Pro Cycling Team	+ 2' 25"
5	João Almeida (POR)	UAE Team Emirates XRG	+ 2' 40"
6	Magnus Sheffield (USA)	INEOS Grenadiers	+ 2' 54"
7	Brandon McNulty (USA)	UAE Team Emirates XRG	+ 3' 05"
8	Clément Champoussin (FRA)	XDS Astana Team	+ 3' 22"
9	Tobias Foss (NOR)	INEOS Grenadiers	+ 3' 28"
10	Harold Tejada (COL)	XDS Astana Team	+ 3' 36"

=== Stage 8 ===
16 March 2025 – Nice to Nice, 119.9 km (74.5 mi)

Stage 8 Result (1-10)
Rank	Rider	Team	Time
1	Magnus Sheffield (USA)	INEOS Grenadiers	2h 48' 37"
2	Matteo Jorgenson (USA)	Visma–Lease a Bike	+ 29"
3	Felix Gall (AUT)	Decathlon–AG2R La Mondiale	+ 35"
4	Michael Storer (AUS)	Tudor Pro Cycling Team	+ 1' 01"
5	Clément Champoussin (FRA)	XDS Astana Team	+ 1' 01"
6	Florian Lipowitz (GER)	Red Bull–Bora–Hansgrohe	+ 1' 01"
7	Thymen Arensman (NED)	INEOS Grenadiers	+ 1' 01"
8	Aleksandr Vlasov	Red Bull–Bora–Hansgrohe	+ 1' 04"
9	Ilan Van Wilder (BEL)	Soudal–Quick-Step	+ 1' 40"
10	Aurélien Paret-Peintre (FRA)	Decathlon–AG2R La Mondiale	+ 1' 40"

General classification after Stage 8 (1–10)
Rank	Rider	Team	Time
1	Matteo Jorgenson (USA)	Visma–Lease a Bike	26h 26' 42"
2	Florian Lipowitz (GER)	Red Bull–Bora–Hansgrohe	+ 1' 15"
3	Thymen Arensman (NED)	INEOS Grenadiers	+ 1' 58"
4	Magnus Sheffield (USA)	INEOS Grenadiers	+ 2' 17"
5	Michael Storer (AUS)	Tudor Pro Cycling Team	+ 3' 03"
6	João Almeida (POR)	UAE Team Emirates XRG	+ 3' 57"
7	Clément Champoussin (FRA)	XDS Astana Team	+ 4' 00"
8	Harold Tejada (COL)	XDS Astana Team	+ 4' 53"
9	Tobias Foss (NOR)	INEOS Grenadiers	+ 4' 59"
10	Ilan Van Wilder (BEL)	Soudal–Quick-Step	+ 5' 26"

== Classification leadership table ==
Classification leadership by stage
Stage	Winner	General classification	Points classification	Mountains classification	Young rider classification	Team classification	Combativity award
1	Tim Merlier	Tim Merlier	Tim Merlier	Alexandre Delettre	Magnus Sheffield	XDS Astana Team	Samuel Fernández
2	Tim Merlier	Tim Merlier	Tim Merlier	Alexandre Delettre	Mick van Dijke	XDS Astana Team	Jonas Abrahamsen
3	Visma–Lease a Bike	Matteo Jorgenson	Tim Merlier	Alexandre Delettre	Florian Lipowitz	Visma–Lease a Bike	not awarded
4	João Almeida	Jonas Vingegaard	Tim Merlier	João Almeida	Mattias Skjelmose	INEOS Grenadiers	Tobias Foss
5	Lenny Martinez	Matteo Jorgenson	Tim Merlier	João Almeida	Florian Lipowitz	INEOS Grenadiers	Ben Swift
6	Mads Pedersen	Matteo Jorgenson	Mads Pedersen	Thomas Gachignard	Florian Lipowitz	INEOS Grenadiers	Rémi Cavagna
7	Michael Storer	Matteo Jorgenson	Mads Pedersen	Thomas Gachignard	Florian Lipowitz	INEOS Grenadiers	Michael Storer
8	Magnus Sheffield	Matteo Jorgenson	Mads Pedersen	Thomas Gachignard	Florian Lipowitz	INEOS Grenadiers	Mads Pedersen
Final		Matteo Jorgenson	Mads Pedersen	Thomas Gachignard	Florian Lipowitz	INEOS Grenadiers	Not awarded

== Classification standings ==
Legend
Denotes the winner of the general classification	Denotes the winner of the mountains classification
Denotes the winner of the points classification	Denotes the winner of the young rider classification
Denotes the winner of the team classification	Denotes the winner of the combativity award

=== General classification ===
Final general classification (1-10)
Rank	Rider	Team	Time
1	Matteo Jorgenson (USA)	Visma–Lease a Bike	26h 26' 42"
2	Florian Lipowitz (GER)	Red Bull–Bora–Hansgrohe	+ 1' 15"
3	Thymen Arensman (NED)	INEOS Grenadiers	+ 1' 58"
4	Magnus Sheffield (USA)	INEOS Grenadiers	+ 2' 17"
5	Michael Storer (AUS)	Tudor Pro Cycling Team	+ 3' 03"
6	João Almeida (POR)	UAE Team Emirates XRG	+ 3' 57"
7	Clément Champoussin (FRA)	XDS Astana Team	+ 4' 00"
8	Harold Tejada (COL)	XDS Astana Team	+ 4' 53"
9	Tobias Foss (NOR)	INEOS Grenadiers	+ 4' 59"
10	Ilan Van Wilder (BEL)	Soudal–Quick-Step	+ 5' 26"

=== Points classification ===
Final points classification (1-10)
Rank	Rider	Team	Points
1	Mads Pedersen (DEN)	Lidl–Trek	62
2	Matteo Jorgenson (USA)	Visma–Lease a Bike	57
3	Magnus Sheffield (USA)	INEOS Grenadiers	41
4	Axel Zingle (FRA)	Visma–Lease a Bike	36
5	Michael Storer (AUS)	Tudor Pro Cycling Team	33
6	Florian Lipowitz (GER)	Red Bull–Bora–Hansgrohe	28
7	Lenny Martinez (FRA)	Team Bahrain Victorious	27
8	Timo Kielich (BEL)	Alpecin–Deceuninck	26
9	Joshua Tarling (GBR)	INEOS Grenadiers	22
10	Emilien Jeannière (FRA)	Team TotalEnergies	22

=== Mountains classification ===
Final mountains classification (1-10)
Rank	Rider	Team	Points
1	Thomas Gachignard (FRA)	Team TotalEnergies	21
2	Michael Storer (AUS)	Tudor Pro Cycling Team	20
3	João Almeida (POR)	UAE Team Emirates XRG	20
4	Alexandre Delettre (FRA)	Team TotalEnergies	17
5	Lenny Martinez (FRA)	Team Bahrain Victorious	14
6	Tobias Foss (NOR)	INEOS Grenadiers	14
7	Magnus Sheffield (USA)	INEOS Grenadiers	12
8	Matteo Jorgenson (USA)	Visma–Lease a Bike	12
9	Aleksandr Vlasov	Red Bull–Bora–Hansgrohe	11
10	Joshua Tarling (GBR)	INEOS Grenadiers	10

=== Young rider classification ===
Final young rider classification (1-10)
Rank	Rider	Team	Time
1	Florian Lipowitz (GER)	Red Bull–Bora–Hansgrohe	26h 27' 57"
2	Magnus Sheffield (USA)	INEOS Grenadiers	+ 1' 02"
3	Ilan Van Wilder (BEL)	Soudal–Quick-Step	+ 4' 11"
4	Pablo Castrillo (ESP)	Movistar Team	+ 4' 30"
5	Raúl García Pierna (ESP)	Arkéa–B&B Hotels	+ 8' 52"
6	Iván Romeo (ESP)	Movistar Team	+ 13' 33"
7	Lenny Martinez (FRA)	Team Bahrain Victorious	+ 16' 13"
8	Joshua Tarling (GBR)	INEOS Grenadiers	+ 17' 06"
9	Johannes Kulset (NOR)	Uno-X Mobility	+ 21' 13"
10	Georg Steinhauser (GER)	EF Education–EasyPost	+ 29' 13"

=== Teams classification ===
Final teams classification (1-10)
Rank	Team	Time
1	(United Kingdom) INEOS Grenadiers	79h 29' 04"
2	(Spain) Movistar Team	+ 15' 32"
3	(Germany) Red Bull–Bora–Hansgrohe	+ 24' 30"
4	(Kazakhstan) XDS Astana Team	+ 25' 20"
5	(France) Decathlon–AG2R La Mondiale	+ 25' 51"
6	(United Arab Emirates) UAE Team Emirates XRG	+ 31' 05"
7	(France) Groupama–FDJ	+ 40' 13"
8	(Australia) Team Jayco–AlUla	+ 45' 01"
9	(Netherlands) Visma–Lease a Bike	+ 45' 50"
10	(Switzerland) Tudor Pro Cycling Team	+ 53' 02"
