= Brandon McNulty =

American cyclist (born 1998)

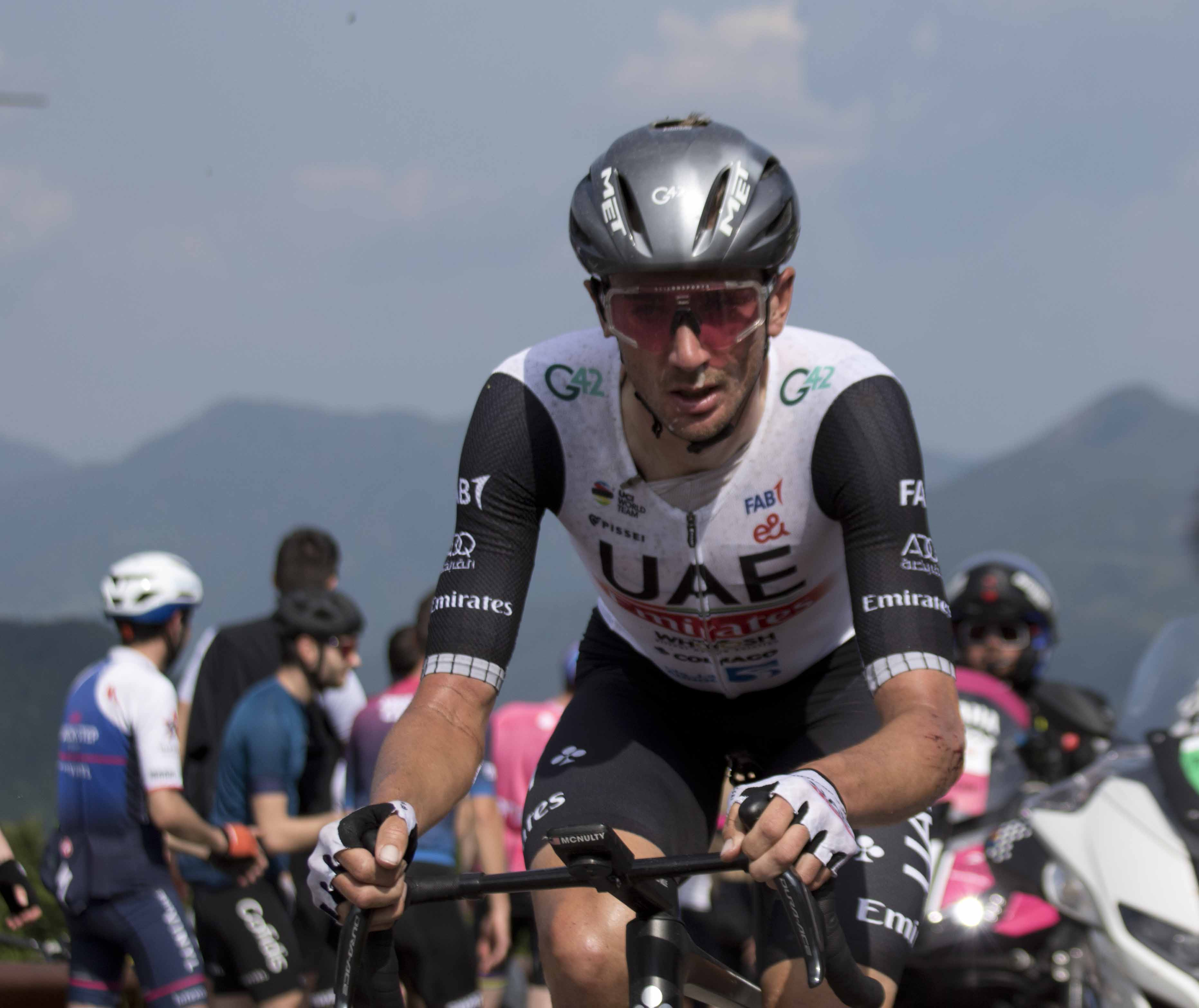
- McNulty at the 2023 Giro d'Italia

Personal information
- Full name: Brandon Alexander McNulty
- Nickname: "Big Mac"
- Born: April 2, 1998 (age 28) Phoenix, Arizona, U.S.
- Height: 6 ft 0 in (183 cm)
- Weight: 153 lb (69 kg)

Cycling career
- Sport: Cycling
- Current team: UAE Team Emirates XRG
- Discipline: Road
- Role: Rider
- Rider type: Puncheur; Time trialist

Amateur teams
- 2012: Fly Racing
- 2013–2014: Landis–Trek
- 2015–2016: LUX Cycling Development

Professional teams
- 2017–2019: Rally Cycling
- 2020–: UAE Team Emirates

Major wins
- Grand Tours Giro d'Italia 1 individual stage (2023) Vuelta a España 1 individual stage (2024) Stage races Tour de Pologne (2025) Volta a la Comunitat Valenciana (2024) Tour de Luxembourg (2025) One-day races and Classics World Road Race Championships (2026) National Time Trial Championships (2023, 2024) GP de Montréal (2025) Ardèche Classic (2022) GP Miguel Induráin (2024) Veneto Classic (2026)
Medal record
Representing United States
Men's road bicycle racing
World Championships
Gold medal – first place	2026 Montreal	Elite road race
Gold medal – first place	2016 Doha	Junior time trial
Silver medal – second place	2017 Bergen	Under-23 time trial
Silver medal – second place	2015 Richmond	Junior time trial
Bronze medal – third place	2019 Yorkshire	Under-23 time trial

Brandon Alexander McNulty (born April 2, 1998) is an American cyclist who rides for UCI WorldTeam UAE Team Emirates XRG. In the 2016 UCI Junior World Time Trial Championships McNulty became the fourth American junior world champion after Greg LeMond, Jeff Evanshine, and Taylor Phinney, winning the time trial by 35 seconds. He won the Men's Road Race at the 2026 UCI Road World Championships in Montreal, Canada, becoming the first American world champion since Lance Armstrong in 1993.

== Career ==
=== Early career ===
McNulty grew up in Phoenix, Arizona and enjoyed riding mountain bikes in his free time. McNulty excelled early, winning almost every mountain bike race he entered while racing in the 11-12 junior categories. McNulty gradually transitioned to road racing. After several wins in local races in Belgium in 2014, McNulty caught the eye of Roy Knickman, manager of LUX cycling. Knickman, realizing McNulty's talent, referred McNulty to coach Barney King. 2015 was a breakout year for McNulty when he won the Valley of the Sun Stage Race TT, averaging 30 mph on a standard road bike. McNulty won the junior national time trial championships that year and went on to compete at the UCI world championships in Richmond.

In 2016, McNulty had even more success, winning the Tour de l'Abitibi and Trofeo Karlsberg, stage races, and the junior national time trial championships for the second year in a row. Then he competed at the UCI Road World Championships and became the fourth American to become a junior world champion after Taylor Phinney, Jeff Evanshine, and Greg LeMond, winning the time trial by 35 seconds.

=== Professional career ===
McNulty turned professional in 2017, and despite being offered numerous contracts with UCI WorldTeams, he chose to ride with the American UCI Continental team Rally Cycling. He won the under-23 national time trial championships and finished second in the World Championships that year.

In 2018, McNulty continued to ride with Rally Cycling, who upgraded to UCI Professional Continental status that year. McNulty made his UCI World Tour debut in the Tour of California, where he finished fourth on stage 6, the queen stage, and ultimately seventh overall, about three-and-a-half minutes behind winner Egan Bernal. He would head to Europe for the second part of the season, after finishing 3rd overall at Tour Alsace, McNulty would have a string of good results at his first Tour de l'Avenir where he would finish 2nd on a mountain stage to Colombian rider Iván Sosa, demonstrating his ability on the climbs. At the UCI Road World Championships, McNulty would go on to finish 7th in the individual time trial event.

In 2019, McNulty took his first win as a professional at the newly revived Giro di Sicilia in the penultimate stage to Ragusa, thus taking the lead in the general classification. On the following day's stage to Mount Etna, he came fourth, and won the general classification.

His first grand tour participation was in the 2020 Giro d'Italia, in which he finished 15th overall. He rode in the 2021 Tour de France where he supported teammate Tadej Pogačar, who won the race.

McNulty rode in the 2020 Summer Olympics road race in late 2021 and put himself in position to win. Late in the race, with less than 25 miles to go, he was among the surviving group, which would likely contain the winner and with approximately 15 miles to go he attacked. Only Richard Carapaz could go with him and the two of them began to open a gap. For more than 10 miles they stayed ahead of the elite group, but with under 5 miles to go Carapaz got away and rode solo for the gold as McNulty fell back into the elite group where he finished. Despite not medaling his result has only been exceeded once by an American cyclist at the Olympics in the previous 20 years.

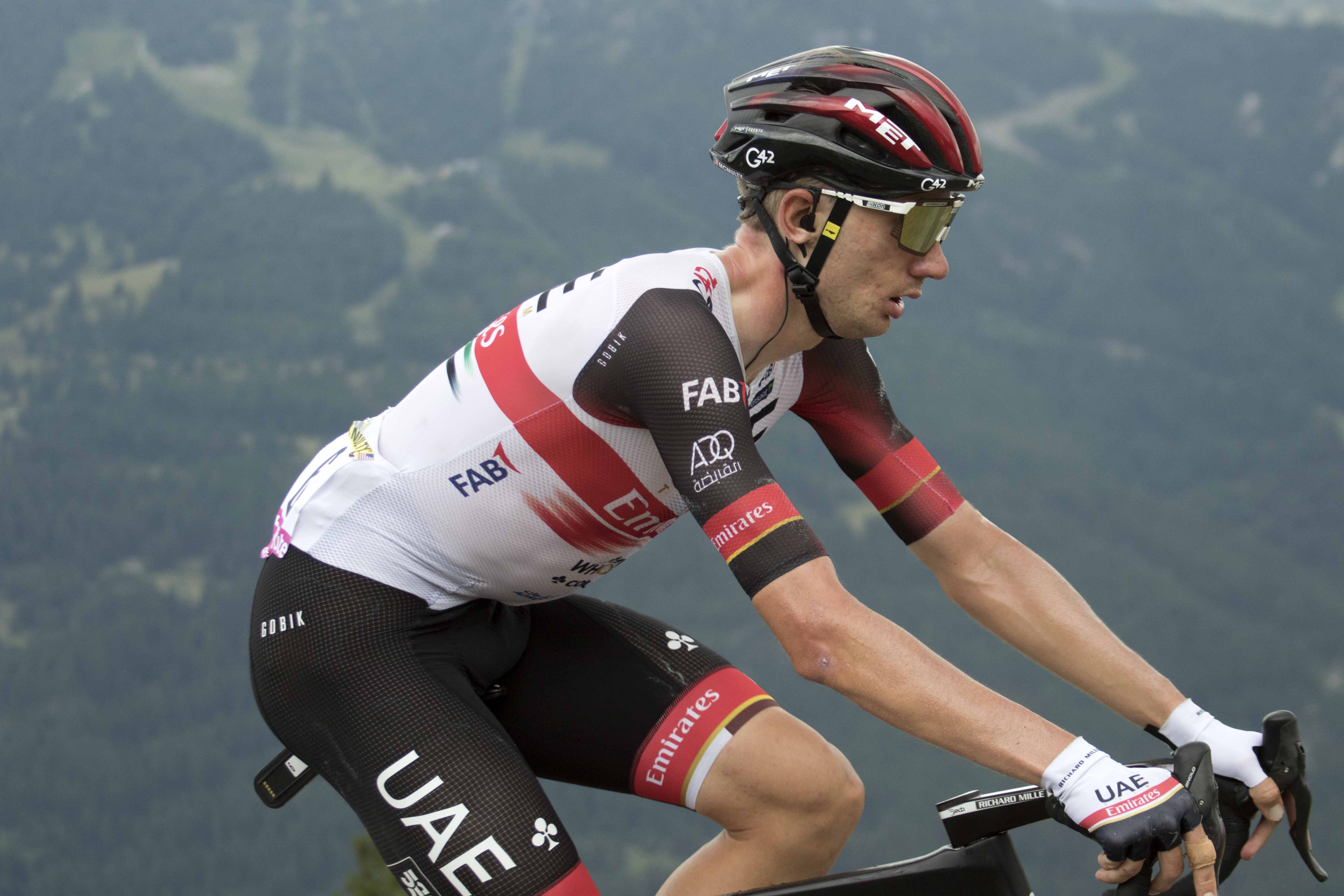
McNulty at the 2022 Tour de France

McNulty started 2022 off strongly winning a few races and went into Paris-Nice with intentions of a high place in the general classification. His hopes were dashed early in the race as he was caught out in crosswinds, and for all intents and purposes lost any hope of even a top 10 finish. He considered quitting the race, but eventually decided to continue and ended up involved in a breakaway on stage 5. With just under 40 kilometers to go he attacked and no one could follow. He continuously built his lead over the breakaway group and won the stage by nearly two minutes.

He entered the 2022 Tour de France as one of the primary Lieutenants for Pogačar, along with Majka, Soler and Bennett; however all of them were out of the race by the critical final two high mountain stages. On stage 17, which included Col de Val Louron-Azet to Peyragudes, McNulty drove a pace that broke the entire elite GC group with the exception of his team leader Pogačar, and Jonas Vingegaard. He crossed the line 3rd and became the first American to be awarded Most Combative Rider since David Zabriskie, who won the award on a flat stage in 2012.

In May 2023, he took his first win in a Grand Tour, outsprinting Ben Healy and Marco Frigo from a three-man breakaway on stage 15 of the Giro d'Italia. He was crowned the United States National Time Trial Champion a month later, followed up with a fourth place finish at the World Time Trial Championships in August. He ended the year with a second place finish to teammate Marc Hirschi at the Tour de Luxembourg.

McNulty had a strong start to 2024, winning the Volta a la Comunitat Valenciana in February, after taking the race lead with his victory on stage four. He next won the stage two time trial in the UAE Tour, but fell out of contention for the overall win on the final day. A week later, he competed in Paris–Nice, where he held the race lead going into the final day, but lost time on the final climb, and ended up third overall, 1 minute and 47 seconds down on compatriot and race winner Matteo Jorgenson. On the final weekend of March, McNulty won the GP Miguel Induráin, beating out Maxim Van Gils to become the first American to win the event. He again displayed prowess as a time trialist, taking the stage three time trial of the Tour de Romandie in late April.

McNulty won the 2025 Tour de Pologne.

== Major results ==
2015
1st Time trial, National Junior Road Championships
1st Overall Course de la Paix Juniors

1st Points classification
1st Stage 2a (ITT)

2nd Overall Tour de l'Abitibi

1st Young rider classification
1st Stages 1 & 3 (ITT)

3rd Time trial, UCI Junior Road World Championships
4th Overall Driedaagse van Axel

1st Young rider classification
1st Stage 2 (ITT)

2016
1st Time trial, UCI Junior Road World Championships
National Junior Road Championships

1st Time trial
2nd Road race

1st Overall Tour de l'Abitibi

1st Stage 3 (ITT)

1st Overall Trofeo Karlsberg

1st Stage 2b (ITT)

7th Overall Tour du Pays de Vaud

1st Stage 2b (ITT)

2017
1st Time trial, National Under-23 Road Championships
2nd Time trial, UCI Road World Under-23 Championships
3rd Overall Tour Alsace

1st Prologue (TTT)

2018
2nd Chrono Kristin Armstrong
3rd Overall Tour Alsace

1st Stage 1 (TTT)

5th Overall Volta Internacional Cova da Beira
7th Overall Tour of California
7th Time trial, UCI Road World Under-23 Championships
2019 (2 pro wins)
1st Overall Giro di Sicilia

1st Young rider classification
1st Stage 3

2nd Chrono Kristin Armstrong
3rd Time trial, UCI Road World Under-23 Championships
7th Overall Tour Poitou-Charentes en Nouvelle-Aquitaine
9th Overall Tour of Oman
2020
4th Overall Vuelta a San Juan
7th Overall Vuelta a Andalucía
2021
6th Road race, Olympic Games
6th Brussels Cycling Classic
2022 (3)
1st Ardèche Classic
1st Trofeo Calvià
1st Stage 5 Paris–Nice
2nd Overall Volta ao Algarve
2nd Trofeo Pollença–Port d'Andratx
4th Trofeo Serra de Tramuntana
Combativity award Stage 17 Tour de France
2023 (2)
National Road Championships

1st Time trial
4th Road race

1st Stage 15 Giro d'Italia
2nd Overall Tour de Luxembourg
4th Time trial, UCI Road World Championships
5th Trofeo Serra de Tramuntana
6th Overall Tour de Pologne
7th Overall Tour of the Basque Country

1st Young rider classification

8th Overall Volta a la Comunitat Valenciana
2024 (9)
1st Time trial, National Road Championships
1st Overall Volta a la Comunitat Valenciana

1st Stage 4

1st Overall CRO Race

1st Stage 3

1st GP Miguel Induráin
Vuelta a España

1st Stage 1 (ITT)
Held & after Stage 1

1st Stage 2 (ITT) UAE Tour
1st Stage 3 (ITT) Tour de Romandie
3rd Overall Paris–Nice

1st Stage 3 (TTT)

3rd Trofeo Calvià
3rd Trofeo Serra de Tramuntana
5th Time trial, Olympic Games
5th Overall Tour of the Basque Country
7th Trofeo Pollença–Port d'Andratx
10th Time trial, UCI Road World Championships
10th Clásica de San Sebastián
2025 (6)
1st Overall Tour de Pologne

1st Stage 7 (ITT)

1st Overall Tour de Luxembourg
1st Overall CRO Race

1st Stage 4

1st Grand Prix Cycliste de Montréal
4th Maryland Cycling Classic
5th Overall Volta a la Comunitat Valenciana
8th Ardèche Classic
9th Overall Giro d'Italia
2026 (2)
UCI Road World Championships

1st Road race
4th Time trial

1st Veneto Classic
2nd Coppa Agostoni
3rd Grand Prix Cycliste de Montréal
5th Overall Volta a la Comunitat Valenciana
5th Giro di Lombardia
6th Overall Tour de Suisse
6th Figueira Champions Classic
10th Giro dell'Emilia

=== General classification results timeline ===
Grand Tour general classification results
Grand Tour	2018	2019	2020	2021	2022	2023	2024	2025	2026
Giro d'Italia	—	—	15	—	—	29	—	9	—
Tour de France	—	—	—	69	19	—	—	—	DNF
Vuelta a España	—	—	—	—	69	—	54	—	—
Major stage race general classification results
Stage races	2018	2019	2020	2021	2022	2023	2024	2025	2026
Paris–Nice	—	—	—	DNF	12	—	3	DNF	DNF
Tirreno–Adriatico	—	—	—	—	—	12	—	—	—
Volta a Catalunya	—	—	NH	13	—	—	—	—	45
Tour of the Basque Country	—	—	NH	17	—	7	5	52	DNF
Tour de Romandie	—	—	NH	—	DNF	—	DNF	—	—
Critérium du Dauphiné	—	—	—	40	11	—	—	—	—
Tour de Suisse	—	DNF	NH	—	—	—	—	—	6

=== Major championships results timeline ===
Event		2017	2018	2019	2020	2021	2022	2023	2024	2025	2026
Olympic Games	Road race	Not held				6	Not held		24	Not held	
Olympic Games	Time trial	Not held				24	Not held		5	Not held	
World Championships	Road race	—	—	—	DNF	DNF	—	—	17	—	1
World Championships	Time trial	—	—	—	29	22	—	4	6	—	4
National Championships	Road race	DNF	10	DNF	NH	—	—	4	2	—	—
National Championships	Time trial	22	6	36	NH	—	—	1	1	—	—

Legend
—	Did not compete
DNF	Did not finish
DSQ	Disqualified
NH	Not held
IP	In progress
