= Chris Carmichael =

Chris Carmichael may refer to:

- Chris Carmichael (cyclist) (born 1961), American cycling, triathlon and endurance sports coach, and former Olympic cyclist
- Chris Carmichael (musician) (born 1962), American musician and arranger
- A fictional person of this name appeared in the early series of The Lucy Show

== See also ==
- Christopher Carmichael, wrestler
