= CWSL =

CWSL may refer to:

- Chinese Women's Super League
- California Western School of Law
