= 2021 Tour de Wallonie =

2021 UCI Europe Tour 2021 UCI ProSeries
- Event poster with previous winner Arnaud Démare centered

Race details
- Dates: 20 – 24 July 2021
- Stages: 5
- Distance: 871.8 (Note: The race was originally 938.7 kilometres (583.3 mi) long but its length was revised after the rerouting of Stages 2 and 3.) km (541.7 mi)
- Winning time: 20h 31' 13"

Results
Jersey awarded to the overall winner	Winner	Quinn Simmons (USA)	(Trek–Segafredo)
	Second	Stan Dewulf (BEL)	(AG2R Citroën Team)
	Third	Alexis Renard (FRA)	(Israel Start-Up Nation)
Jersey awarded to the points classification winner	Points	Dylan Groenewegen (NED)	(Team Jumbo–Visma)
Jersey awarded to the mountains classification winner	Mountains	Florian Vermeersch (BEL)	(Lotto–Soudal)
Jersey awarded to the youth classification winner	Youth	Quinn Simmons (USA)	(Trek–Segafredo)
Jersey awarded to the sprints classification winner	Sprints	Dries De Bondt (BEL)	(Alpecin–Fenix)
	Team	Trek–Segafredo	

The 2021 Tour de Wallonie (known as the Ethias–Tour de Wallonie for sponsorship reasons) was a five-stage men's professional road cycling race mainly held in the Belgian region of Wallonia. It was a 2.Pro race as part of the 2021 UCI Europe Tour and the 2021 UCI ProSeries calendars. It was the forty-eighth edition of the Tour de Wallonie, which started on 20 July and finished on 24 July.

== Teams ==
Thirteen of the nineteen UCI WorldTeams, seven UCI ProTeams, and five UCI Continental teams made up the twenty-five teams that participated in the race. With six riders each, Arkéa–Samsic, Baloise–Trek Lions, and Hagens Berman Axeon were the only teams to not enter a full squad of seven riders. 172 riders started the race.

UCI WorldTeams

- AG2R Citroën Team
- Bora–Hansgrohe
- Cofidis
- Deceuninck–Quick-Step
- EF Education–Nippo
- Groupama–FDJ
- Intermarché–Wanty–Gobert Matériaux
- Israel Start-Up Nation
- Lotto–Soudal
- Team Jumbo–Visma
- Team Qhubeka NextHash
- Trek–Segafredo
- UAE Team Emirates

UCI ProTeams

- Alpecin–Fenix
- Arkéa–Samsic
- B&B Hotels p/b KTM
- Bingoal Pauwels Sauces WB
- Sport Vlaanderen–Baloise
- Team TotalEnergies
- Uno-X Pro Cycling Team

UCI Continental Teams

- Baloise–Trek Lions
- Hagens Berman Axeon
- Pauwels Sauzen–Bingoal
- Riwal Cycling Team
- Tarteletto–Isorex

== Route ==
Stage characteristics and winners
Stage	Date	Route	Distance	Type	Winner
1	20 July	Genappe to Héron	185.7 km (115.4 mi)	Hilly stage	Dylan Groenewegen (NED)
2	21 July	~~Verviers to Herve~~ (Note: Stage 2 was changed due to the damage and consequences of the 2021 European floods in Wallonia.); Zolder to Zolder	~~184 km (114 mi)~~ 120 km (75 mi)	~~Hilly stage~~ Flat stage	Fabio Jakobsen (NED)
3	22 July	~~Plombières to Érezée~~ (Note: Stage 3 was originally due to start in Plombières but was rerouted due to the aftermath of the 2021 European floods.); Waimes to Érezée	~~179.9 km (111.8 mi)~~ 177 km (110 mi)	Hilly stage	Quinn Simmons (USA)
4	23 July	Neufchâteau to Fleurus	206 km (128 mi)	Hilly stage	Dylan Groenewegen (NED)
5	24 July	Dinant to Quaregnon	183.1 km (113.8 mi)	Hilly stage	Fabio Jakobsen (NED)
Total			~~938.7 km (583.3 mi)~~ 871.8 km (541.7 mi)		

== Stages ==
=== Stage 1 ===
20 July 2021 — Genappe to Héron, 185.7 km (115.4 mi)

Stage 1 Result
Rank	Rider	Team	Time
1	Dylan Groenewegen (NED)	Team Jumbo–Visma	4h 21' 36"
2	Hugo Hofstetter (FRA)	Israel Start-Up Nation	+ 0"
3	Gianni Vermeersch (BEL)	Alpecin–Fenix	+ 0"
4	Alexander Kristoff (NOR)	UAE Team Emirates	+ 0"
5	Rui Oliveira (POR)	UAE Team Emirates	+ 0"
6	Amaury Capiot (BEL)	Arkéa–Samsic	+ 0"
7	Fernando Gaviria (COL)	UAE Team Emirates	+ 0"
8	Piet Allegaert (BEL)	Cofidis	+ 0"
9	Giacomo Nizzolo (ITA)	Team Qhubeka NextHash	+ 0"
10	Milan Menten (BEL)	Bingoal Pauwels Sauces WB	+ 0"

General classification after Stage 1
Rank	Rider	Team	Time
1	Dylan Groenewegen (NED)	Team Jumbo–Visma	4h 21' 26"
2	Hugo Hofstetter (FRA)	Israel Start-Up Nation	+ 4"
3	Dries De Bondt (BEL)	Alpecin–Fenix	+ 4"
4	Gianni Vermeersch (BEL)	Alpecin–Fenix	+ 6"
5	Jenthe Biermans (BEL)	Israel Start-Up Nation	+ 7"
6	Stan Dewulf (BEL)	AG2R Citroën Team	+ 8"
7	Quinten Hermans (BEL)	Intermarché–Wanty–Gobert Matériaux	+ 9"
8	Baptiste Planckaert (BEL)	Intermarché–Wanty–Gobert Matériaux	+ 9"
9	Tom Paquot (BEL)	Bingoal Pauwels Sauces WB	+ 9"
10	Alexander Kristoff (NOR)	UAE Team Emirates	+ 10"

=== Stage 2 ===
21 July 2021 — ~~Verviers to Herve, 184 km (114 mi)~~ Zolder to Zolder, 120 km (75 mi)

Stage 2 was originally due to be cancelled due to the damage and consequences of the 2021 European floods in Wallonia. However, on 20 July, it was announced that the stage would be replaced by a 40-lap criterium on the Circuit Zolder in Limburg.

Stage 2 Result
Rank	Rider	Team	Time
1	Fabio Jakobsen (NED)	Deceuninck–Quick-Step	2h 34' 42"
2	Fernando Gaviria (COL)	UAE Team Emirates	+ 0"
3	Amaury Capiot (BEL)	Arkéa–Samsic	+ 0"
4	Piet Allegaert (BEL)	Cofidis	+ 0"
5	Andrea Pasqualon (ITA)	Intermarché–Wanty–Gobert Matériaux	+ 0"
6	Marc Sarreau (FRA)	AG2R Citroën Team	+ 0"
7	Giacomo Nizzolo (ITA)	Team Qhubeka NextHash	+ 0"
8	Alexis Renard (FRA)	Israel Start-Up Nation	+ 0"
9	Stefano Oldani (ITA)	Lotto–Soudal	+ 0"
10	John Degenkolb (GER)	Lotto–Soudal	+ 0"

General classification after Stage 2
Rank	Rider	Team	Time
1	Dylan Groenewegen (NED)	Team Jumbo–Visma	6h 56' 08"
2	Fabio Jakobsen (NED)	Deceuninck–Quick-Step	+ 0"
3	Fernando Gaviria (COL)	UAE Team Emirates	+ 4"
4	Hugo Hofstetter (FRA)	Israel Start-Up Nation	+ 4"
5	Quinten Hermans (BEL)	Intermarché–Wanty–Gobert Matériaux	+ 4"
6	Dries De Bondt (BEL)	Alpecin–Fenix	+ 4"
7	Erik Resell (NOR)	Uno-X Pro Cycling Team	+ 5"
8	Amaury Capiot (BEL)	Arkéa–Samsic	+ 6"
9	Gianni Vermeersch (BEL)	Alpecin–Fenix	+ 6"
10	Jenthe Biermans (BEL)	Israel Start-Up Nation	+ 7"

=== Stage 3 ===
22 July 2021 — ~~Plombières~~ Waimes to Érezée, ~~179.9 km (111.8 mi)~~ 177 km (110 mi)

Stage 3 Result
Rank	Rider	Team	Time
1	Quinn Simmons (USA)	Trek–Segafredo	4h 07' 19"
2	Stan Dewulf (BEL)	AG2R Citroën Team	+ 1"
3	Alexis Renard (FRA)	Israel Start-Up Nation	+ 13"
4	Fernando Barceló (ESP)	Cofidis	+ 13"
5	Pascal Eenkhoorn (NED)	Team Jumbo–Visma	+ 13"
6	Maxim Van Gils (BEL)	Lotto–Soudal	+ 17"
7	Alessandro Covi (ITA)	UAE Team Emirates	+ 25"
8	Tim Wellens (BEL)	Lotto–Soudal	+ 25"
9	Milan Menten (BEL)	Bingoal Pauwels Sauces WB	+ 25"
10	Amaury Capiot (BEL)	Arkéa–Samsic	+ 25"

General classification after Stage 3
Rank	Rider	Team	Time
1	Quinn Simmons (USA)	Trek–Segafredo	11h 03' 27"
2	Stan Dewulf (BEL)	AG2R Citroën Team	+ 3"
3	Alexis Renard (FRA)	Israel Start-Up Nation	+ 19"
4	Fernando Barceló (ESP)	Cofidis	+ 23"
5	Pascal Eenkhoorn (NED)	Team Jumbo–Visma	+ 23"
6	Quinten Hermans (BEL)	Intermarché–Wanty–Gobert Matériaux	+ 26"
7	Maxim Van Gils (BEL)	Lotto–Soudal	+ 27"
8	Amaury Capiot (BEL)	Arkéa–Samsic	+ 31"
9	Jenthe Biermans (BEL)	Israel Start-Up Nation	+ 32"
10	Juan Pedro López (ESP)	Trek–Segafredo	+ 32"

=== Stage 4 ===
23 July 2021 — Neufchâteau to Fleurus, 206 km (128 mi)

Stage 4 Result
Rank	Rider	Team	Time
1	Dylan Groenewegen (NED)	Team Jumbo–Visma	4h 55' 16"
2	Giacomo Nizzolo (ITA)	Team Qhubeka NextHash	+ 0"
3	Fernando Gaviria (COL)	UAE Team Emirates	+ 0"
4	Luca Mozzato (ITA)	B&B Hotels p/b KTM	+ 0"
5	Quinn Simmons (USA)	Trek–Segafredo	+ 0"
6	Gianni Vermeersch (BEL)	Alpecin–Fenix	+ 0"
7	Amaury Capiot (BEL)	Arkéa–Samsic	+ 0"
8	Stefano Oldani (ITA)	Lotto–Soudal	+ 0"
9	Florian Sénéchal (FRA)	Deceuninck–Quick-Step	+ 0"
10	Milan Menten (BEL)	Bingoal Pauwels Sauces WB	+ 0"

General classification after Stage 4
Rank	Rider	Team	Time
1	Quinn Simmons (USA)	Trek–Segafredo	15h 58' 43"
2	Stan Dewulf (BEL)	AG2R Citroën Team	+ 3"
3	Alexis Renard (FRA)	Israel Start-Up Nation	+ 19"
4	Fernando Barceló (ESP)	Cofidis	+ 23"
5	Pascal Eenkhoorn (NED)	Team Jumbo–Visma	+ 23"
6	Quinten Hermans (BEL)	Intermarché–Wanty–Gobert Matériaux	+ 26"
7	Maxim Van Gils (BEL)	Lotto–Soudal	+ 27"
8	Amaury Capiot (BEL)	Arkéa–Samsic	+ 31"
9	Eliot Lietaer (BEL)	B&B Hotels p/b KTM	+ 31"
10	Fabio Van den Bossche (BEL)	Sport Vlaanderen–Baloise	+ 32"

=== Stage 5 ===
24 July 2021 — Dinant to Quaregnon, 183.1 km (113.8 mi)

Stage 5 Result
Rank	Rider	Team	Time
1	Fabio Jakobsen (NED)	Deceuninck–Quick-Step	4h 32' 31"
2	Rüdiger Selig (GER)	Bora–Hansgrohe	+ 0"
3	Milan Menten (BEL)	Bingoal Pauwels Sauces WB	+ 0"
4	Luca Mozzato (ITA)	B&B Hotels p/b KTM	+ 0"
5	Amaury Capiot (BEL)	Arkéa–Samsic	+ 0"
6	Jake Stewart (GBR)	Groupama–FDJ	+ 0"
7	Alexander Kristoff (NOR)	UAE Team Emirates	+ 0"
8	Rasmus Tiller (NOR)	Uno-X Pro Cycling Team	+ 0"
9	Nick van der Lijke (NED)	Riwal Cycling Team	+ 0"
10	Stefano Oldani (ITA)	Lotto–Soudal	+ 0"

General classification after Stage 5
Rank	Rider	Team	Time
1	Quinn Simmons (USA)	Trek–Segafredo	20h 31' 13"
2	Stan Dewulf (BEL)	AG2R Citroën Team	+ 4"
3	Alexis Renard (FRA)	Israel Start-Up Nation	+ 20"
4	Fernando Barceló (ESP)	Cofidis	+ 24"
5	Pascal Eenkhoorn (NED)	Team Jumbo–Visma	+ 24"
6	Quinten Hermans (BEL)	Intermarché–Wanty–Gobert Matériaux	+ 27"
7	Maxim Van Gils (BEL)	Lotto–Soudal	+ 28"
8	Sean Quinn (USA)	Hagens Berman Axeon	+ 31"
9	Amaury Capiot (BEL)	Arkéa–Samsic	+ 32"
10	Milan Menten (BEL)	Bingoal Pauwels Sauces WB	+ 32"

== Classification leadership table ==
Classification leadership by stage
Stage	Winner	General classification	Points classification	Mountains classification	Sprints classification	Young rider classification	Team classification	Combativity award
1	Dylan Groenewegen	Dylan Groenewegen	Dylan Groenewegen	Tom Paquot	Dries De Bondt	Stan Dewulf	UAE Team Emirates	Alexis Gougeard
2	Fabio Jakobsen	Dylan Groenewegen	Dylan Groenewegen	Tom Paquot	Dries De Bondt	Juan Pedro López	UAE Team Emirates	Dries De Bondt
3	Quinn Simmons	Quinn Simmons	Quinn Simmons	Florian Vermeersch	Quinten Hermans	Quinn Simmons	Trek–Segafredo	Tom Van Asbroeck
4	Dylan Groenewegen	Quinn Simmons	Dylan Groenewegen	Florian Vermeersch	Dries De Bondt	Quinn Simmons	Trek–Segafredo	Toon Aerts
5	Fabio Jakobsen	Quinn Simmons	Dylan Groenewegen	Florian Vermeersch	Dries De Bondt	Quinn Simmons	Trek–Segafredo	Sean Quinn
Final		Quinn Simmons	Dylan Groenewegen	Florian Vermeersch	Dries De Bondt	Quinn Simmons	Trek–Segafredo	Not awarded

- On stage 2, Hugo Hofstetter, who was second in the points classification, wore the yellow jersey, because first-placed Dylan Groenewegen wore the orange jersey as the leader of the general classification. On stage 3, Fabio Jakobsen wore the yellow jersey for the same reason.
- On stage 4, Fabio Jakobsen, who was second in the points classification, wore the yellow jersey, because first-placed Quinn Simmons wore the orange jersey as the leader of the general classification. For the same reason, Stan Dewulf, who was second in the young rider classification, wore the red jersey on stages 4 and 5.

== Final classification standings ==
Legend
Denotes the winner of the general classification	Denotes the winner of the sprints classification
Denotes the winner of the points classification	Denotes the winner of the young rider classification
Denotes the winner of the mountains classification	

=== General classification ===
Final general classification (1–10)
Rank	Rider	Team	Time
1	Quinn Simmons (USA)	Trek–Segafredo	20h 31' 13"
2	Stan Dewulf (BEL)	AG2R Citroën Team	+ 4"
3	Alexis Renard (FRA)	Israel Start-Up Nation	+ 20"
4	Fernando Barceló (ESP)	Cofidis	+ 24"
5	Pascal Eenkhoorn (NED)	Team Jumbo–Visma	+ 24"
6	Quinten Hermans (BEL)	Intermarché–Wanty–Gobert Matériaux	+ 27"
7	Maxim Van Gils (BEL)	Lotto–Soudal	+ 28"
8	Sean Quinn (USA)	Hagens Berman Axeon	+ 31"
9	Amaury Capiot (BEL)	Arkéa–Samsic	+ 32"
10	Milan Menten (BEL)	Bingoal Pauwels Sauces WB	+ 32"

=== Points classification ===
Final points classification (1–10)
Rank	Rider	Team	Points
1	Dylan Groenewegen (NED)	Team Jumbo–Visma	50
2	Fabio Jakobsen (NED)	Deceuninck–Quick-Step	50
3	Fernando Gaviria (COL)	UAE Team Emirates	39
4	Amaury Capiot (BEL)	Arkéa–Samsic	34
5	Quinn Simmons (USA)	Trek–Segafredo	33
6	Giacomo Nizzolo (ITA)	Team Qhubeka NextHash	26
7	Gianni Vermeersch (BEL)	Alpecin–Fenix	21
8	Stan Dewulf (BEL)	AG2R Citroën Team	20
9	Luca Mozzato (ITA)	B&B Hotels p/b KTM	20
10	Hugo Hofstetter (FRA)	Israel Start-Up Nation	20

=== Mountains classification ===
Final mountains classification (1–10)
Rank	Rider	Team	Points
1	Florian Vermeersch (BEL)	Lotto–Soudal	32
2	Tom Van Asbroeck (BEL)	Israel Start-Up Nation	26
3	Alexis Gougeard (FRA)	AG2R Citroën Team	18
4	Gianluca Brambilla (ITA)	Trek–Segafredo	16
5	Baptiste Planckaert (BEL)	Intermarché–Wanty–Gobert Matériaux	16
6	Tom Paquot (BEL)	Bingoal Pauwels Sauces WB	16
7	Thomas Joseph (BEL)	Tarteletto–Isorex	16
8	Quinn Simmons (USA)	Trek–Segafredo	14
9	Alessandro De Marchi (ITA)	Israel Start-Up Nation	14
10	Loïc Vliegen (BEL)	Intermarché–Wanty–Gobert Matériaux	10

=== Sprints classification ===
Final sprints classification (1–10)
Rank	Rider	Team	Points
1	Dries De Bondt (BEL)	Alpecin–Fenix	16
2	Quinten Hermans (BEL)	Intermarché–Wanty–Gobert Matériaux	14
3	Sean Quinn (USA)	Hagens Berman Axeon	8
4	Ward Vanhoof (BEL)	Sport Vlaanderen–Baloise	8
5	Tom Van Asbroeck (BEL)	Israel Start-Up Nation	8
6	Erik Resell (NOR)	Uno-X Pro Cycling Team	8
7	Florian Vermeersch (BEL)	Lotto–Soudal	8
8	Julius van den Berg (NED)	EF Education–Nippo	7
9	Eliot Lietaer (BEL)	B&B Hotels p/b KTM	6
10	Fabio Van den Bossche (BEL)	Sport Vlaanderen–Baloise	5

=== Young rider classification ===
Final young rider classification (1–10)
Rank	Rider	Team	Time
1	Quinn Simmons (USA)	Trek–Segafredo	20h 31' 13"
2	Stan Dewulf (BEL)	AG2R Citroën Team	+ 4"
3	Alexis Renard (FRA)	Israel Start-Up Nation	+ 20"
4	Maxim Van Gils (BEL)	Lotto–Soudal	+ 28"
5	Sean Quinn (USA)	Hagens Berman Axeon	+ 31"
6	Fabio Van den Bossche (BEL)	Sport Vlaanderen–Baloise	+ 33"
7	Juan Pedro López (ESP)	Trek–Segafredo	+ 33"
8	Stefano Oldani (ITA)	Lotto–Soudal	+ 35"
9	André Carvalho (POR)	Hagens Berman Axeon	+ 36"
10	Alessandro Covi (ITA)	UAE Team Emirates	+ 36"

=== Team classification ===
Final team classification (1–10)
Rank	Team	Time
1	Trek–Segafredo	61h 35' 02"
2	Cofidis	+ 13"
3	Lotto–Soudal	+ 17"
4	Sport Vlaanderen–Baloise	+ 25"
5	AG2R Citroën Team	+ 2' 27"
6	Team Jumbo–Visma	+ 3' 07"
7	Bingoal Pauwels Sauces WB	+ 3' 45"
8	Israel Start-Up Nation	+ 4' 15"
9	Bora–Hansgrohe	+ 5' 50"
10	Riwal Cycling Team	+ 6' 12"
