= Jeff Evanshine =

American racing cyclist (born 1973)

Personal information
- Full name: Jeff Evanshine
- Born: October 2, 1973 (age 53) Placentia, California, U.S.

Cycling career
- Sport: Cycling
- Current team: Retired
- Discipline: Road
- Role: Rider
- Rider type: All-Rounder

Professional teams
- 1996: Nutra Fig-Colorado Cyclist
- 1997: Saturn

Major wins
- UCI Juniors Road World Championships – Men's road race (1991)
Medal record
Representing the United States
Men's road cycling
World Championships
Gold medal – first place	1991 Colorado Springs	UCI Juniors Road World Championships – Men's road race

Jeff Evanshine (born October 2, 1973) is a former professional road bicycle racer from the United States. He was the 1991 UCI Junior Road World Champion. On July 14, 1991, Evanshine attacked out of the shattered field on Colorado Springs' Garden of the Gods circuit, caught the Belarusian Alexandre Kozlov on the final lap of the race, and won solo, in dramatic fashion with a lead of nearly one minute, posting a final time of 3 hours, 3 minutes, 33 seconds for the 77-mile race. With his victory, Evanshine became the first American since Greg LeMond in 1979 to win a Junior Road World Championship.

Evanshine's promising career as an elite cyclist was derailed the following year, however, when he missed an out-of-competition drug test and was notified on the eve of the 1992 US Olympic Trials in Altoona, PA that he'd been banned for three months. It was the notorious Danish coach René Wenzel who had prepared Evanshine for his victory at the Worlds and he was suspected of complicity in Evanshine's missed control.

Evanshine quit cycling and joined the US Army, although Chris Carmichael got him to serve part of his term in the Army by racing. Jeff continued to show his extreme talent that year while in the 1993 Tour de L'Avenir, by taking over the polka dot climbing jersey for part of the race. Later, Evanshine left the service disillusioned with military life, but returned to competition for two years in 1996 and 1997 with the Saturn professional team. However, following the 1997 season, he left elite cycling permanently.

== Major achievements and accolades ==
1991
UCI Road World Championships Junior Men's Road Race
1996
Stage, Fresca Classic
