= Barry M. Bloom =

American sports journalist and author

- Education: Fairleigh Dickinson University (BA); San Francisco State University (MA); California Western School of Law
- Occupations: Sports journalist, author
- Years active: 1976–present
- Organization: Baseball Writers' Association of America
- Known for: Coverage of Major League Baseball

Barry M. Bloom is an American sports journalist and author known primarily for his coverage of Major League Baseball (MLB). Bloom spent 16 years with the San Diego Union-Tribune and its predecessors before working for Bloomberg News and later MLB.com.

== Education ==
Bloom earned a bachelor's degree from Fairleigh Dickinson University and a master's degree from San Francisco State University. He studied at California Western School of Law from 1993 to 1995.

== Career ==
Bloom began working as a freelance sportswriter in the San Francisco Bay Area, covering sports in San Francisco and Oakland, including the Oakland Athletics. He joined the San Diego Tribune in 1982, initially covering the San Diego Clippers, and began covering the San Diego Padres in 1983.

Bloom's coverage of the Padres occasionally brought him into conflict with the team. In 1984, the players voted 24–1 to stop speaking to him after he criticized their conduct during an on-field altercation in Atlanta. Steve Garvey cast the only vote against the boycott. He continued to cover the club during the boycott.

While covering the Padres, Bloom reported on the team's players and management. In 1985, the Los Angeles Times cited an interview he conducted with Padres infielder Alan Wiggins while Wiggins was away from the team. A 1988 Padres media guide listed Bloom, then with the San Diego Tribune, as a member of the San Diego chapter of the Baseball Writers' Association of America (BBWAA).

Bloom worked for the San Diego Union-Tribune and its predecessors for about 16 years. He then spent five years with Bloomberg News, covering baseball and hockey. He later joined MLB.com as a national reporter.

In 2012 the Los Angeles Times cited his reporting on groups seeking to buy the Padres. In 2016, the Society for American Baseball Research (SABR) interviewed Bloom about his career in baseball journalism.

After leaving MLB.com Bloom wrote about the business of professional sports for Forbes and later became a senior sports writer for Sportico. He also wrote about people he had covered as a baseball reporter, including Padres player Tony Gwynn. In 2007, Bloom told the Los Angeles Times that Gwynn continued speaking with him during the 1984 boycott, although Gwynn had voted with the other players.

Bloom has also written several books about baseball, including two co-authored with former player and manager Larry Bowa. He is a member of the Baseball Writers' Association of America (BBWAA) and has voted in elections for the National Baseball Hall of Fame and Museum. The Hall of Fame listed him among eligible BBWAA voters for the 2016 election, and the BBWAA listed him among the voters for the 2026 election.

== Awards and honors ==
Bloom has won multiple San Diego Press Club Excellence in Journalism awards for his columns, news stories, and features. In 2014, Bloom won first place in the San Diego Press Club's daily newspapers and websites column category for an MLB.com column about Tony Gwynn's memorial service.

In 2020 he placed second in the organization's online and daily newspapers sports category for his work for Forbes. In 2025, he placed second for a Sportico column on baseball history.
