= 2026 UCI Road World Championships – Men's road race =

Cycling event

Men's road race
2026 UCI Road World Championships

Race details
- Dates: 27 September 2026
- Distance: 273.4 km (169.9 mi)
- Winning time: 6:17:04

Medalists
	Gold	(United States) Brandon McNulty (USA)
	Silver	(Australia) Michael Matthews (AUS)
	Bronze	(Netherlands) Mathieu van der Poel (NED)

The Men's road race of the 2026 UCI Road World Championships was a cycling event that took place on 27 September 2026 in Montreal, Canada. It was the 93rd edition of the championship, for which Tadej Pogačar of Slovenia was the defending champion, having won in 2025. Due to injuries sustained at the 2026 Vuelta a España, Pogačar did not defend his title.

The race was won by United States rider Brandon McNulty, beating Australian rider Michael Matthews and Dutch rider Mathieu van der Poel by 13 seconds after escaping with around 30 kilometres (19 mi) remaining.

== Course ==
The race covered 273.4 kilometres (169.9 mi) with 3,803 metres (12,477 ft) of total elevation gain. Starting at Quartier DIX30 in Brossard, the course passed through several municipalities in the Montérégie region before crossing the Samuel De Champlain Bridge to reach the finishing circuit in downtown Montréal.

The circuit was 13.4 kilometres (8.3 mi) in length around Mount Royal, with 269 metres (883 ft) of elevation gain per lap. The circuit included the Voie Camillien-Houde climb (2.3 kilometres (1.4 mi) at 6.2% average gradient), the Chemin de la Polytechnique with sections exceeding 11% gradient, and a false flat rising along Avenue du Parc, which served as the finish line. The circuit would be tackled 12 times. The circuit was similar to that used by the Grand Prix Cycliste de Montréal, as well as previous cycling events in Montréal such as the 1974 UCI Road World Championships and 1976 Summer Olympics.

== Final classification ==
Rank	Athlete	Nation	Time
1st place, gold medalist(s)	Brandon McNulty	United States	6h 17' 04"
2nd place, silver medalist(s)	Michael Matthews	Australia	+ 13"
3rd place, bronze medalist(s)	Mathieu van der Poel	Netherlands	s.t.
4	Quinn Simmons	United States	s.t.
5	Isaac del Toro	Mexico	+ 14"
6	Mads Pedersen	Denmark	s.t.
7	Tom Pidcock	Great Britain	s.t.
8	Matteo Jorgenson	United States	s.t.
9	Giulio Ciccone	Italy	s.t.
10	Ben Healy	Ireland	s.t.
11	Mauro Schmid	Switzerland	+ 22"
12	Remco Evenepoel	Belgium	+ 25"
13	Juan Ayuso	Spain	+ 2' 08"
14	Stefan Küng	Switzerland	+ 2' 19"
15	Paul Seixas	France	+ 2' 47"
16	Jørgen Nordhagen	Norway	+ 3' 09"
17	Oscar Onley	Great Britain	s.t.
18	Christian Scaroni	Italy	+ 3' 12"
19	Mikkel Frølich Honoré	Denmark	+ 3' 14"
20	Davide Piganzoli	Italy	+ 3' 20"
21	Primož Roglič	Slovenia	+ 3' 29"
22	Michael Valgren	Denmark	+ 4' 20"
23	Toms Skujiņš	Latvia	+ 4' 25"
24	Anthon Charmig	Denmark	s.t.
25	Tiesj Benoot	Belgium	+ 4' 31"
26	Pavel Sivakov	France	+ 4' 37"
27	Santiago Buitrago	Colombia	+ 4' 41"
28	Wout van Aert	Belgium	+ 5' 11"
29	Maxim Van Gils	Belgium	s.t.
30	Andreas Kron	Denmark	+ 5' 46"
31	Adam Yates	Great Britain	+ 6' 37"
32	Michael Leonard	Canada	+ 6' 39"
33	Tobias Halland Johannessen	Norway	+ 6' 48"
34	Guillermo Thomas Silva	Uruguay	s.t.
35	Michael Woods	Canada	s.t.
36	Jhonatan Narváez	Ecuador	s.t.
37	Aleksandr Vlasov	Individual Neutral Athletes	s.t.
38	Georg Zimmermann	Germany	s.t.
39	Byron Munton	South Africa	s.t.
40	Michael Storer	Australia	s.t.
41	Menno Huising	Netherlands	+ 6' 51"
42	Jack Haig	Australia	+ 6' 53"
43	Igor Arrieta	Spain	s.t.
44	Nicolas Prodhomme	France	s.t.
45	Nickolas Zukowsky	Canada	s.t.
46	Marcel Camprubí	Spain	+ 7' 02"
47	Florian Lipowitz	Germany	+ 7' 04"
48	Riley Sheehan	United States	+ 10' 00"
49	Corbin Strong	New Zealand	s.t.
50	Michał Kwiatkowski	Poland	s.t.
51	Tobias Foss	Norway	s.t.
52	Embret Svestad-Bårdseng	Norway	s.t.
53	Jai Hindley	Australia	s.t.
54	Felix Großschartner	Austria	s.t.
55	Lorenzo Mark Finn	Italy	s.t.
56	Nelson Oliveira	Portugal	+ 13' 11"
57	Lawrence Warbasse	United States	+ 15' 35"
58	Ivo Oliveira	Portugal	s.t.

Status	Rider	Nation
DNF	Ali Al Shaikhahmed	Saudi Arabia
DNF	João Almeida	Portugal
DNF	Amir Arslan Ansari	Refugee Cycling Team
DNF	Heorhii Antonenko	Ukraine
DNF	Tiago Antunes	Portugal
DNF	Bruno Armirail	France
DNF	Nikiforos Arvanitou	Greece
DNF	Kasper Asgreen	Denmark
DNF	Henrique Avancini	Brazil
DNF	Kohath Baron	Dominica
DNF	Maral-Erdene Batmunkh	Mongolia
DNF	Alex Baudin	France
DNF	Kristiāns Belohvoščiks	Latvia
DNF	Markel Beloki	Spain
DNF	Alberto Bettiol	Italy
DNF	Stefan Bissegger	Switzerland
DNF	Mikkel Bjerg	Denmark
DNF	Guillaume Boivin	Canada
DNF	Marco Brenner	Germany
DNF	Edgar Cadena	Mexico
DNF	Ulises Alfredo Castillo	Mexico
DNF	Mattia Cattaneo	Italy
DNF	Derrick Chavarria	Belize
DNF	Fabio Christen	Switzerland
DNF	Jan Christen	Switzerland
DNF	Pier-André Côté	Canada
DNF	Nico Denz	Germany
DNF	Mark Donovan	United Kingdom
DNF	Pascal Eenkhoorn	Netherlands
DNF	Felix Engelhardt	Germany
DNF	José Antonio Escarcega	Mexico
DNF	Afonso Eulálio	Portugal
DNF	Tilen Finkšt	Slovenia
DNF	Eder Frayre	Mexico
DNF	Mateusz Gajdulewicz	Poland
DNF	Felix Gall	Austria
DNF	Carlos Alfonso García	Mexico
DNF	Raúl García Pierna	Spain
DNF	Biniam Girmay	Eritrea
DNF	Gal Glivar	Slovenia
DNF	Matevž Govekar	Slovenia
DNF	Jo Hashikawa	Japan
DNF	Quinten Hermans	Belgium
DNF	Sergio Higuita	Colombia
DNF	Marc Hirschi	Switzerland
DNF	Daan Hoole	Netherlands
DNF	Kaden Hopkins	Bermuda
DNF	Hugo Houle	Canada
DNF	Samandar Janikulov	Uzbekistan
DNF	Jordan Jegat	France
DNF	Christofer Jurado	Panama
DNF	Jakub Kaczmarek	Poland
DNF	Patrick Konrad	Austria
DNF	Vladimír Kováčik	Slovakia
DNF	Søren Kragh Andersen	Denmark
DNF	Merhawi Kudus	Eritrea
DNF	Anton Kuzmin	Kazakhstan
DNF	Jordan Labrosse	France
DNF	Victor Langellotti	Monaco
DNF	Andreas Leknessund	Norway
DNF	Bart Lemmen	Netherlands
DNF	Li You	China
DNF	Emīls Liepiņš	Latvia
DNF	Daniil Marukhin	Kazakhstan
DNF	Enric Mas	Spain
DNF	Fredd Matute	Honduras
DNF	Alexandre Mayer	Mauritius
DNF	Jamie Meehan	Ireland
DNF	Luka Mezgec	Slovenia
DNF	Andrea Mifsud	Malta
DNF	Madis Mihkels	Estonia
DNF	Andreas Miltiadis	Cyprus
DNF	Oussama Mimouni	Algeria
DNF	Matej Mohorič	Slovenia
DNF	Bauke Mollema	Netherlands
DNF	António Morgado	Portugal
DNF	Ryan Mullen	Ireland
DNF	Henok Mulubrhan	Eritrea
DNF	Nicholas Narraway	Bermuda
DNF	Pavel Novák	Czech Republic
DNF	Thibau Nys	Belgium
DNF	Ben O'Connor	Australia
DNF	Ben Oliver	New Zealand
DNF	Luis Daniel Oses	Costa Rica
DNF	Jakub Otruba	Czech Republic
DNF	Mathijs Paasschens	Netherlands
DNF	Valentin Paret-Peintre	France
DNF	Piotr Pękala	Poland
DNF	Giulio Pellizzari	Italy
DNF	Finlay Pickering	United Kingdom
DNF	Laurence Pithie	New Zealand
DNF	Mārtiņš Pluto	Latvia
DNF	Athit Poulard	Thailand
DNF	Sean Quinn	United States
DNF	Nairo Quintana	Colombia
DNF	Darren Rafferty	Ireland
DNF	Nadav Raisberg	Israel
DNF	Brandon Rivera	Colombia
DNF	Manuel Rodas	Guatemala
DNF	Vicente Rojas	Chile
DNF	Iván Romeo	Spain
DNF	Maximilian Schachmann	Germany
DNF	Alec Segaert	Belgium
DNF	James Shaw	United Kingdom
DNF	Artem Shmidt	United States
DNF	Anders Skaarseth	Norway
DNF	Jakob Söderqvist	Sweden
DNF	Mihajlo Stolić	Serbia
DNF	Harold Tejada	Colombia
DNF	Callum Thornley	United Kingdom
DNF	Jan Tratnik	Slovenia
DNF	Matteo Trentin	Italy
DNF	Luke Tuckwell	Australia
DNF	Mathias Vacek	Czech Republic
DNF	Iustin-Ioan Văidian	Romania
DNF	Attila Valter	Hungary
DNF	Tim van Dijke	Netherlands
DNF	Mardoqueo Vásquez	Guatemala
DNF	Kevin Vermaerke	United States
DNF	Gianni Vermeersch	Belgium
DNF	Carlos Verona	Spain
DNF	Arno Wallenborn	Luxembourg
DNF	Fred Wright	United Kingdom
