= Clément Champoussin =

French bicycle racer

- Champoussin in 2026

Personal information
- Born: 29 May 1998 (age 28) Nice, France
- Height: 1.80 m (5 ft 11 in)
- Weight: 61 kg (134 lb)

Cycling career
- Sport: Cycling
- Current team: XDS Astana Team
- Discipline: Road
- Role: Rider
- Rider type: Climber

Amateur team
- 2017–2020: Chambéry CF

Professional teams
- 2018: AG2R La Mondiale (stagiaire)
- 2019: AG2R La Mondiale (stagiaire)
- 2020–2022: AG2R La Mondiale
- 2023–2024: Arkéa–Samsic
- 2025–: XDS Astana Team

Major wins
- Grand Tours Vuelta a España 1 individual stage (2021)

Clément Champoussin (born 29 May 1998) is a French cyclist, who currently rides for UCI WorldTeam XDS Astana Team. In October 2020, he was named in the startlist for the 2020 Vuelta a España. On stage 20 of the 2021 Vuelta he won the final mountain stage finding himself among the GC contenders of Roglič, Haig and Mas. He finished the race 16th overall.

== Major results ==
2018
2nd Ruota d'Oro
3rd Piccolo Giro di Lombardia
5th Overall Tour de l'Avenir
7th Overall Kreiz Breizh Elites
9th Overall Ronde de l'Isard
2019
1st Overall Giro del Friuli-Venezia Giulia

1st Points classification
1st Stages 1 (TTT) & 4

2nd Piccolo Giro di Lombardia
3rd Overall Ronde de l'Isard
3rd Overall Grand Prix Priessnitz spa
4th Overall Tour de l'Avenir
6th Overall Orlen Nations Grand Prix

1st Stage 1 (TTT)

9th Overall Giro di Sicilia
9th Gran Piemonte
2020
8th Overall Tour de Luxembourg
2021 (1 pro win)
1st Stage 20 Vuelta a España
2nd Ardèche Classic
4th Trofeo Laigueglia
6th Overall Tour de l'Ain
2022
6th Ardèche Classic
7th Classic Grand Besançon Doubs
9th GP Miguel Induráin
10th Trofeo Laigueglia
10th Tour du Jura
2023 (1)
Arctic Race of Norway

1st Points classification
1st Stage 4

5th Trofeo Laigueglia
5th Mont Ventoux Dénivelé Challenge
2024 (1)
1st Giro della Toscana
2nd Overall Arctic Race of Norway
3rd Grand Prix de Wallonie
7th GP Miguel Induráin
2025
3rd Gran Premio Castellón
4th Ardèche Classic
4th Vuelta a Murcia
5th Overall Arctic Race of Norway
5th GP Gippingen
7th Overall Paris–Nice
7th La Drôme Classic
7th Clàssica Comunitat Valenciana 1969
7th Classic Var
10th Overall Tour of the Basque Country
10th Overall Tour de Suisse
2026
5th Overall Tour of the Basque Country
5th Overall Tour de la Provence
8th GP Miguel Induráin
9th Tour des Alpes-Maritimes
10th Trofeo Serra Tramuntana

=== Grand Tour general classification results timeline ===
| Grand Tour | 2020 | 2021 | 2022 | 2023 | 2024 | 2025 |
|---|---|---|---|---|---|---|
| Giro d'Italia | — | DNF | — | — | — | — |
| Tour de France | — | — | — | 51 | 101 | |
| Vuelta a España | 31 | 16 | 32 | — | — | |

Legend
| — | Did not compete |
| DNF | Did not finish |
