= David Roger =

American lawyer

District Attorney of Clark County
- In office January 6, 2003 – January 3, 2012
- Preceded by: Stewart Bell
- Succeeded by: Mary Anne Miller (interim)

Personal details
- Born: David Jeanjoseph Roger; July 28, 1961 (age 65) Oakland, California, U.S.
- Party: Republican (1992–present)
- Education: Bishop Gorman High School; California Western School of Law; University of Nevada, Las Vegas
- Website: Official website

David Jeanjoseph Roger (born July 28, 1961) is an American attorney and politician. He served as District Attorney of Clark County from January 6, 2003, to January 3, 2012. He is a member of the Republican Party.

Roger was born on July 28, 1961, in Oakland, California. He moved to Las Vegas, Nevada with his family when he was a teenager; he graduated from Bishop Gorman High School in 1979. He then majored in business at the University of Nevada, Las Vegas where he graduated in 1983. After graduating from California Western School of Law in San Diego in 1986, he moved back to Las Vegas to practice law. He passed the Nevada Bar Exam that same year and obtained a law clerkship under two Nevada District Court judges, Stephen L. Huffaker and Paul Goldman. The following year in 1987, Roger was hired on with the local District Attorney's office as a criminal prosecutor and quickly moved up to handling major cases. He was elected as District Attorney of Clark County on November 5, 2002. In response to the violence of the white, rich and suburban 311 Boyz, Roger asked for probation for the subjects, which the judge found very lenient.

Roger successfully prosecuted Rick Tabish and Sandra Murphy in the highly publicized Ted Binion murder trial in the Spring of 2000. However, in 2003, the Nevada Supreme Court overturned the convictions and Tabish and Murphy were both acquitted of murder after a new trial occurred during the Fall of 2004.

Roger had come to national media attention from the O. J. Simpson Las Vegas robbery case charges. He personally prosecuted OJ Simpson on the charges winning a conviction on all counts against Simpson.

In September 2010, Roger filed a felony cocaine possession charge against Paris Hilton, but capitulated and allowed Hilton to plead guilty on two misdemeanor counts in exchange for one year unsupervised probation, a $2000 fine and 200 hours of community service.

Roger resigned as District Attorney of Clark County on January 3, 2012, and was immediately replaced by Republican Mary Anne Miller as interim district attorney by the Clark County Commission and later replaced by Democrat Steve Wolfson as permanent district attorney by the Clark County Commission on January 24, 2012.

Legal offices
Preceded by Stewart Bell	District Attorney of Clark County; January 6, 2003 – January 3, 2012	Succeeded by Mary Anne Miller (interim)
