= 2024 GP Miguel Induráin =

2024 UCI ProSeries

Race details
- Dates: 30 March 2024
- Stages: 1
- Distance: 198.1 km (123.1 mi)
- Winning time: 4h 55' 48"

Results
| | Winner | Brandon McNulty (USA) | (UAE Team Emirates) |
| | Second | Maxim Van Gils (BEL) | (Lotto–Dstny) |
| | Third | Oscar Onley (GBR) | (Team dsm–firmenich PostNL) |

The 2024 GP Miguel Induráin was the 70th edition of the GP Miguel Induráin road cycling one day race, which was held on 30 March 2024, starting and finishing in Estella.

== Teams ==
Eleven of the eighteen UCI WorldTeams, nine UCI ProTeams, and two UCI Continental teams made up the twenty-two teams that participated in the race. Of these teams, 18 entered a full squad of seven riders, while Cofidis, Decathlon–AG2R La Mondiale , Eolo–Kometa and UAE Team Emirates entered six riders.

UCI WorldTeams

- Arkéa–B&B Hotels
- Astana Qazaqstan Team
- Bora–Hansgrohe
- Cofidis
- Decathlon–AG2R La Mondiale
- EF Education–EasyPost
- Lidl–Trek
- Movistar Team
- Team dsm–firmenich PostNL
- Team Jayco–AlUla
- UAE Team Emirates

UCI ProTeams

- Burgos BH
- Caja Rural–Seguros RGA
- Equipo Kern Pharma
- Euskaltel–Euskadi
- Israel–Premier Tech
- Lotto–Dstny
- Q36.5 Pro Cycling Team
- Polti–Kometa
- Team TotalEnergies

UCI Continental Teams

- Illes Balears Arabay Cycling
- Sabgal–Anicolor

== Result ==
Result
| Rank | Rider | Team | Time |
|---|---|---|---|
| 1 | Brandon McNulty (USA) | UAE Team Emirates | 4h 55' 48" |
| 2 | Maxim Van Gils (BEL) | Lotto–Dstny | + 0" |
| 3 | Oscar Onley (GBR) | Lidl–Trek | + 2" |
| 4 | Ion Izagirre (ESP) | Cofidis | + 6" |
| 5 | Archie Ryan (IRE) | EF Education–EasyPost | + 8" |
| 6 | Samuele Battistella (ITA) | Astana Qazaqstan Team | + 16" |
| 7 | Clément Champoussin (FRA) | Arkéa–B&B Hotels | + 16" |
| 8 | Steff Cras (BEL) | Team TotalEnergies | + 16" |
| 9 | Maximilian Schachmann (GER) | Bora–Hansgrohe | + 16" |
| 10 | Fernando Barceló (ESP) | Caja Rural–Seguros RGA | + 16" |
