= 2022 Ardèche Classic =

2022 Faun-Ardèche Classic
2022 UCI ProSeries

Race details
- Dates: 26 February 2022
- Stages: 1
- Distance: 168.5 km (104.7 mi)
- Winning time: 4h 26' 36"

Results
	Winner	Brandon McNulty (USA)	(UAE Team Emirates)
	Second	Mauri Vansevenant (BEL)	(Quick-Step Alpha Vinyl Team)
	Third	Sepp Kuss (USA)	(Team Jumbo–Visma)

The 2022 Faun-Ardèche Classic was the 22nd edition of the Classic Sud-Ardèche cycle race. It was held on 26 February 2022 as a category 1.Pro race on the UCI ProSeries. The race started and finished in Guilherand-Granges. The race was won by Brandon McNulty of UAE Team Emirates.

== Teams ==
Twenty-two teams of up to seven riders started the race: eleven UCI WorldTeams, six UCI ProTeams, and five UCI Continental. 114 riders finished out of the 146 who entered the race.

UCI WorldTeams

- AG2R Citroën Team
- Astana Qazaqstan Team
- Bora–Hansgrohe
- Cofidis
- Groupama–FDJ
- Intermarché–Wanty–Gobert Matériaux
- Lotto–Soudal
- Quick-Step Alpha Vinyl Team
- Team Jumbo–Visma
- Trek–Segafredo
- UAE Team Emirates

UCI ProTeams

- Alpecin–Fenix
- Arkéa–Samsic
- B&B Hotels–KTM
- Bingoal Pauwels Sauces WB
- Team TotalEnergies
- Uno-X Pro Cycling Team

UCI Continental Teams

- Go Sport–Roubaix–Lille Métropole
- Nice Métropole Côte d'Azur
- Riwal Cycling Team
- St. Michel–Auber93
- Team UC Nantes Atlantique

== Result ==
Result
Rank	Rider	Team	Time
1	Brandon McNulty (USA)	UAE Team Emirates	4h 26' 36"
2	Mauri Vansevenant (BEL)	Quick-Step Alpha Vinyl Team	+ 45"
3	Sepp Kuss (USA)	Team Jumbo–Visma	+ 45"
4	Lennard Kämna (GER)	Bora–Hansgrohe	+ 1' 33"
5	Guillaume Martin (FRA)	Cofidis	+ 1' 33"
6	Clément Champoussin (FRA)	AG2R Citroën Team	+ 1' 36"
7	Quentin Pacher (FRA)	Groupama–FDJ	+ 1' 44"
8	Warren Barguil (FRA)	Arkéa–Samsic	+ 1' 44"
9	Lilian Calmejane (FRA)	AG2R Citroën Team	+ 1' 44"
10	Alexis Vuillermoz (FRA)	Team TotalEnergies	+ 1' 44"
