= Kevin Sandkuhler =

Kevin M. Sandkuhler (born August 28, 1953) is an American lawyer, and retired brigadier general in the United States Marine Corps. His 2003 memo expressing concerns about the US interrogation of terrorism suspects, released in 2005 after a declassification request by Senator Lindsey Graham, received national and international attention.

== Biography ==
Sandkuhler was born in Queens, New York. After receiving his B.A. degree in history from the College of the Holy Cross, Worcester, Massachusetts, in 1975, Sandkuhler was commissioned a second lieutenant via the NROTC Program. He was assigned to the 3rd Battalion, 11th Marines, First Marine Division at Camp Pendleton, California, where he served as a fire direction officer, platoon commander and adjutant. In July 1978, he was selected to attend law school under the Funded Law Education Program.

Sandkuhler attended California Western School of Law, in San Diego, California, from 1978 to 1981. He received his Juris Doctor (cum laude) in May 1981 and was admitted to the Bar of the State of California.

Following the Naval Justice School, he was assigned to the Office of the Staff Judge Advocate, 1st Marine Division, Camp Pendleton, California. He served in a variety of judge advocate positions, including trial counsel, defense counsel, and deputy staff judge advocate. In 1984 he was transferred to Okinawa and served with the 3d Force Service Support Group as the O-I-C of the Review Section and deployed to Korea as the senior judicial advocate for the 35th Marine Amphibious Unit. In January 1985 he was reassigned to Camp Pendleton.

At Camp Pendleton, Sandkuhler served as the senior defense counsel within the Office of the Staff Judge Advocate. In November 1986 he became the director of the Contracting Division, MCB Camp Pendleton and a contracting officer. In 1989, he was selected under the Special Education Program to return to law school and received a Master of Laws degree in Government Contracts from George Washington University in 1991.

Sandkuhler was then assigned as an associate counsel within the Office of Counsel at Marine Corps Systems Command. In 1993 he attended the U.S. Army War College, in Carlisle, Pennsylvania, graduating in June 1994. Subsequently, he was assigned to the Joint Staff, where he served as a non-proliferation planner in the Directorate for Strategic Plans and Policy (J-5). During September 1997, he was transferred to III MEF located on Okinawa, Japan, and served as the staff judge advocate for III MEF and 3d Marine Division.

Upon his return to the United States, he became the director, Appellate Government Division (Code 46) at the Navy-Marine Corps Appellate Review Activity, Washington, D.C. In July 2000, he became the chief defense counsel for the Marine Corps. He was appointed a brigadier general in July 2001.

== Role in rescinding rules for the use of "extended interrogation techniques" ==
Sandkuhler is notable for his participation in discussions, in December 2002, of reports that interrogators from the Joint Task Force 160 and Joint Task Force 170 were using controversial interrogation techniques on the captives held in the Guantanamo Bay detention camps, in Cuba.

Sandkuhler was the Marine Corps's staff judge advocate to the commandant of the Marine Corps when Alberto J. Mora, the Department of the Navy's general counsel convened several meetings of the Navy's most senior lawyers after David Brant, the director of the NCIS, drew Mora's attention to use of the questionable interrogation techniques by the Navy's tenants at Guantanamo.

Regarding the threat to American GIs, if the controversial policies weren't rescinded, Sandkuhler commented:

Comprehensive protection is lacking for DOD personnel who may be tried by other nations and/or international bodies for violations of international law.

Neal Katyal, the attorney for Salim Ahmed Hamdan, one of the Guantanamo detainees who faced charges before a Guantanamo military commissions quoted Sandkuhler and other senior military justice officials. Katyal quoted Sandkuhler's comments on civilians in the Justice Department making decisions about how to treat America's captives, which would put Americans GIs at risk, if they were taken captive. According to Katyal, Sandkuhler pointed out the DOJ:

... does not represent the services; thus, understandably, concern for servicemembers is not reflected in their opinion.

== Service career ==
2001–2006	Staff judge advocate to the commandant of the Marine Corps	senior uniformed attorney in the Marine Corps
2000–2001	Chief Defense Counsel for the Marine Corps	
1994–1997	Served in support of the Joint Chiefs of Staff as a Non Proliferation Planner in the Directorate for Strategic Plans and Policies	Focussed on nuclear non-proliferation issues.

== Congressional testimony ==
Sandkulhler was called to testify before the Senate Judiciary Committee while it was considering replacing the military commissions the Executive Branch had created, which were subsequently struck down by the United States Supreme Court.

== Retirement ==
Sandkuhler retired from the Marine Corps with the rank of brigadier general. Following his retirement Sandkukhler went to work for Pinkerton Government Services. On January 29, 2007, Pinkerton Government Services announced that Sandkuhler had been appointed its new president and chief executive officer.

== Awards and honors ==
His personal and unit awards and decorations include the Distinguished Service Medal, Defense Superior Service Medal, Legion of Merit, Meritorious Service Medal, Joint Service Achievement Medal, Navy and Marine Corps Achievement Medal, Joint Meritorious Unit Award, Navy Unit Commendation, Navy Meritorious Unit Commendation, National Defense Service Medal, Armed Forces Expeditionary Medal, and Sea Service Deployment Ribbon.
