= 2025 Grand Prix Cycliste de Montréal =

One-day cycling race in Canada

2025 UCI World Tour, race 34 of 36

Race details
- Dates: 14 September 2025
- Stages: 1
- Distance: 209.1 km (129.9 mi)
- Winning time: 5h 14' 04"

Results
	Winner	Brandon McNulty (USA)	(UAE Team Emirates XRG)
	Second	Tadej Pogačar (SLO)	(UAE Team Emirates XRG)
	Third	Quinn Simmons (USA)	(Lidl–Trek)

The 2025 Grand Prix Cycliste de Montréal was a road cycling one-day race that took place on 14 September 2025 in Montréal, Canada. It was the 14th edition of the Grand Prix Cycliste de Montréal and the 34th event of the 2025 UCI World Tour. The race was won by American Brandon McNulty of UAE Team Emirates XRG.

== Teams ==
All eighteen UCI WorldTeams, four UCI ProTeams, and the Canadian national team made up the twenty-three teams that participated in the race.

UCI WorldTeams

- Alpecin–Deceuninck
- Arkéa–B&B Hotels
- Cofidis
- Decathlon–AG2R La Mondiale
- EF Education–EasyPost
- Groupama–FDJ
- Ineos Grenadiers
- Intermarché–Wanty
- Lidl–Trek
- Movistar Team
- Red Bull–Bora–Hansgrohe
- Soudal–Quick-Step
- Team Bahrain Victorious
- Team Picnic–PostNL
- Team Jayco–AlUla
- UAE Team Emirates XRG
- Visma–Lease a Bike
- XDS Astana Team

UCI ProTeams

- Israel–Premier Tech
- Lotto
- Tudor Pro Cycling Team
- Uno-X Mobility

National Teams

- Canada

== Course ==
The race used a hilly 12.3-kilometre (7.6 mi) circuit around Mount Royal, with the longest climb being Côte Camilien-Houde (1.8 km long and 8% average grade). 17 laps of the circuit make the race 209.1 kilometres (129.9 mi) in length.

== Result ==
Result
Rank	Rider	Team	Time
1	Brandon McNulty (USA)	UAE Team Emirates XRG	5h 14' 04"
2	Tadej Pogačar (SLO)	UAE Team Emirates XRG	+ 0"
3	Quinn Simmons (USA)	Lidl–Trek	+ 1' 03"
4	Neilson Powless (USA)	EF Education–EasyPost	+ 1' 45"
5	Adam Yates (GBR)	UAE Team Emirates XRG	+ 1' 49"
6	Louis Barré (FRA)	Intermarché–Wanty	+ 2' 00"
7	Tiesj Benoot (BEL)	Visma–Lease a Bike	+ 2' 25"
8	Alex Aranburu (ESP)	Movistar Team	+ 2' 57"
9	Corbin Strong (NZL)	Israel–Premier Tech	+ 2' 59"
10	Alberto Bettiol (ITA)	XDS Astana Team	+ 2' 59"
