= Quinn Simmons =

American cyclist (born 2001)

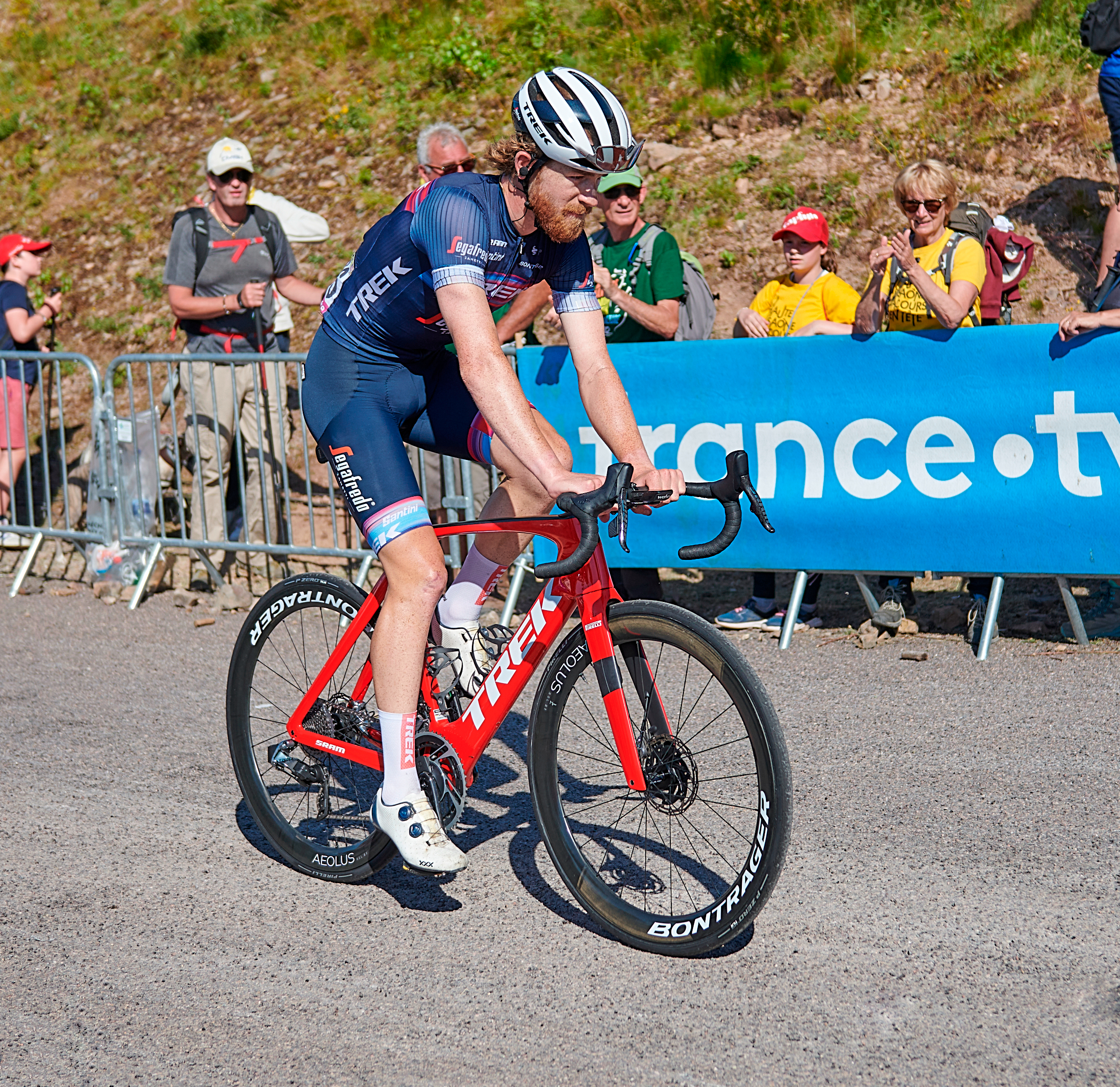
- Simmons at the 2022 Tour de France

Personal information
- Nickname: Captain America
- Born: May 8, 2001 (age 25) Durango, Colorado
- Height: 1.85 m (6 ft 1 in)
- Weight: 73 kg (161 lb)

Cycling career
- Sport: Cycling
- Current team: Lidl–Trek
- Discipline: Road
- Role: Rider

Amateur team
- 2019: Lux–Sideshow p/b Specialized

Professional team
- 2020–: Trek–Segafredo

Major wins
- Stage races Tour de Wallonie (2021) One-day races and classics National Road Race Championships (2023, 2025, 2026) Japan Cup (2026)
Medal record
Men's road bicycle racing
Representing United States
World Championships
| Gold medal – first place | 2019 Yorkshire | Junior road race |

Quinn Simmons (born May 8, 2001) is an American road cyclist, who currently rides for UCI WorldTeam Lidl–Trek.

== Career ==
=== Early career 2018–2021 ===
Simmons's first sport was ski mountaineering, for which he won the bronze medal in the cadet category in the 2017 World Championships. After switching to road cycling, he won the 2019 world junior road race championships, and the 2018 US junior national road race and time trial championships.

On July 22, 2021, Simmons took his first professional victory on Stage 3 of the Tour de Wallonie, taking the overall lead in the process. He managed to maintain his lead until the race's conclusion to win his first professional stage race.

Simmons made his Grand Tour debut in the 2021 Vuelta a España. He was first involved in a breakaway on stage 16, but the group was caught by the peloton in the final kilometers. Three stages later, he was part of another breakaway, which would stay out in front until the finish. He finished third in the final sprint behind Rui Oliveira and winner Magnus Cort.

=== 2022–present ===
Early in the 2022 season, Simmons finished seventh in Strade Bianche. He then raced Tirreno–Adriatico, primarily as a domestique for team leader Giulio Ciccone. On stage 4, he was part of the main breakaway and accumulated enough points to take the lead in the mountains classification (the green jersey). Then, he added to total on stage 6 and held off pressure from Davide Bais, the nearest competitor, to defend the jersey for the remainder of the race.

Simmons entered the 2022 Tour de Suisse and dominated the mountains classification. He took the lead on day one and was still in the lead when 29 riders had to leave the race due to a Covid outbreak. On stage 6 he got involved in the breakaway to collect KOM points. It was an extremely hot day and he eventually ran out of water, and therefore got dropped. After getting water from the team car he fought his way back to the front to compete for the stage win. He finished the final two stages to claim the KOM jersey.

He was named to the start list of the 2022 Tour de France. On stage 3, he lost contact with his team late in the stage, getting stuck in the back of the peloton as his teammates were up front defending Mads Pedersen. Simmons went off-road and rode through the grass, around the peloton, to rejoin his team, for which he was penalized with a 500 Francs fine, losing 25 UCI world tour points, 20 seconds in the general classification, 40 points in the points competition and 1 point in the mountains classification. On stage 6, he got into the first Tour breakaway of his career, which included Jakob Fuglsang and the yellow jersey of Wout van Aert. The break did not succeed, and before long it was Simmons and Van Aert riding together. He noted how easily Van Aert was able to ride away from him in the end, but he took the lesson from the Belgian and later said that the level Van Aert is at now, is where he hopes to be in a few years. Simmons got involved in other breakaways as the race progressed. On stage 14, he rode hard up one of the middle climbs as part of a planned strategy to extend the gap over the peloton, and if possible drop riders from the group for the benefit of Pedersen. He rode so hard that he ended up stopping and throwing up after his work at the front was done. His teammate Pedersen went on to win the stage. On stage 19, he was named Most Combative Rider.

== Suspension ==
On September 30, 2020, Simmons was suspended by Trek–Segafredo for actions on Twitter. In the incident, he used a black hand emoji in response to an anti-Trump tweet from Dutch cycling journalist José Been, who essentially said that she wanted nothing to do with anyone who supported the Trump presidency. Simmons used the black hand emoji and said "Buh-bye" in the politically charged interactions. This led to a suspension by the team, which considered his actions to be racially insensitive. In a subsequent apology, Simmons denied racist intent. Trek–Segafredo reinstated Simmons to the team that November. At a press conference following his reinstatement, Simmons described the suspension as undeserved and "wrong."

== Personal life ==
Immediately following the conclusion of the 2025 Tour de France, Simmons proposed to Sydney Berry, his girlfriend, on the Champs-Élysées in Paris.

== Major results ==
2018
1st Road race, National Junior Road Championships
Saarland Trofeo

1st Points classification
1st Stage 4

1st Mountains classification, Ronde des Vallées
3rd Gent–Wevelgem Junioren
7th Paris–Roubaix Juniors
2019
UCI Road World Junior Championships

1st Road race
4th Time trial

1st Time trial, National Junior Road Championships
1st Overall Driedaagse van Axel

1st Points classification
1st Stages 1, 2 (ITT) & 4

1st Overall Grand Prix Rüebliland

1st Points classification
1st Stages 2b (ITT) & 3

1st Overall Keizer der Juniores

1st Mountains classification
1st Young rider classification
1st Stages 2a (ITT)

1st Gent–Wevelgem Junioren
Tour du Pays de Vaud

1st Points classification
1st Stage 2b (ITT)

2020
2nd Overall Tour de Hongrie
6th Bretagne Classic
2021 (2 pro wins)
1st Overall Tour de Wallonie

1st Young rider classification
1st Stage 3

10th Ardèche Classic
2022
1st Mountains classification, Tirreno–Adriatico
1st Mountains classification, Tour de Suisse
7th Strade Bianche
8th Maryland Cycling Classic
Combativity award Stage 19 Tour de France
2023 (2)
1st Road race, National Road Championships
5th La Drôme Classic
10th Overall Vuelta a San Juan

1st Stage 3

2024
9th Road race, UCI Road World Championships
10th Overall Tour of Guangxi
2025 (3)
1st Road race, National Road Championships
1st Stage 3 Tour de Suisse
1st Stage 6 Volta a Catalunya
3rd Grand Prix Cycliste de Montréal
4th Giro di Lombardia
8th La Drôme Classic
2026 (3)
1st Road race, National Road Championships
1st Japan Cup
1st Stage 4 Tour Auvergne-Rhône-Alpes
2nd GP Miguel Induráin
4th Road race, UCI Road World Championships
4th Grand Prix Cycliste de Montréal
4th Tre Valli Varesine
5th Grand Prix Cycliste de Québec
9th Philadelphia Cycling Classic
Combativity award Stage 15 Tour de France

=== Grand Tour general classification results timeline ===
| Grand Tour | 2021 | 2022 | 2023 | 2024 | 2025 | 2026 |
|---|---|---|---|---|---|---|
| Giro d'Italia | — | — | — | — | — | — |
| Tour de France | — | 66 | DNF | — | 59 | 18 |
| Vuelta a España | 124 | — | — | — | — | |

Legend
| — | Did not compete |
| DNF | Did not finish |
