= Tom Paquot =

Belgian cyclist

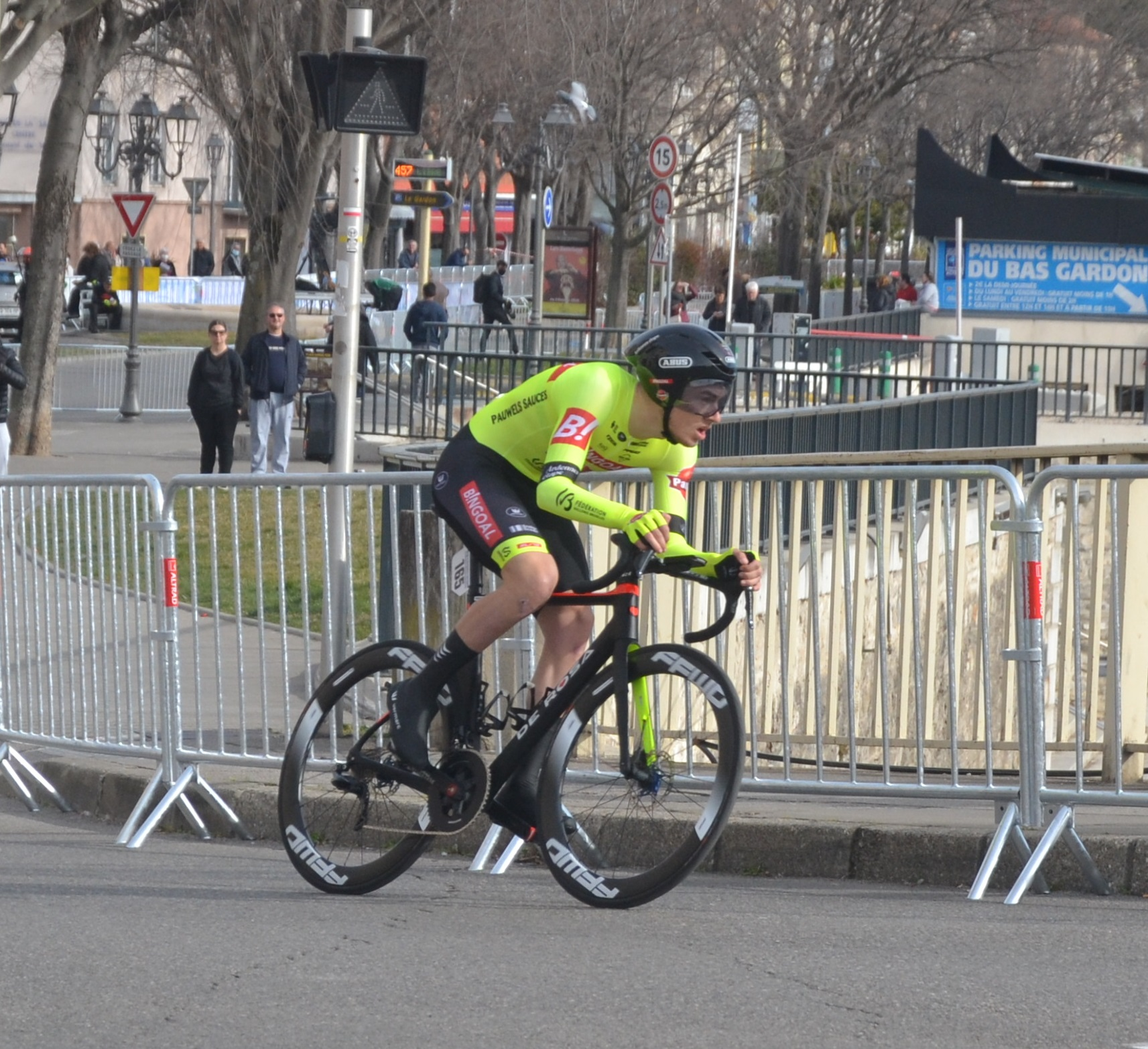
- Paquot at the 2022 Étoile de Bessèges

Personal information
- Born: 22 September 1999 (age 27) Rocourt, Belgium
- Height: 1.84 m (6 ft 0 in)
- Weight: 71 kg (157 lb)

Cycling career
- Sport: Cycling
- Current team: Intermarché–Wanty
- Discipline: Road
- Role: Rider

Amateur teams
- 2016–2017: Vérandas Willems–Crabbé Toitures–CC Chevigny Juniors
- 2019: Wallonie Bruxelles (stagiaire)

Professional teams
- 2018–2020: AGO–Aqua Service
- 2021–2022: Bingoal WB
- 2023–: Intermarché–Circus–Wanty

Tom Paquot (born 22 September 1999) is a Belgian cyclist, who currently rides for UCI WorldTeam Intermarché–Wanty.

== Major results ==
2017
3rd E3 Harelbeke Junioren
2019
1st Stage 4 Tour de Liège
2nd Grand Prix François Faber
4th Grand Prix des Marbriers
2020
1st Overall Arden Challenge

1st Stage 1

1st Memorial Fred De Bruyne
2021
3rd Tour du Doubs
8th Grote Prijs Jef Scherens
10th Classic Grand Besançon Doubs
