= Saint-Just-en-Chevalet =

- Commune
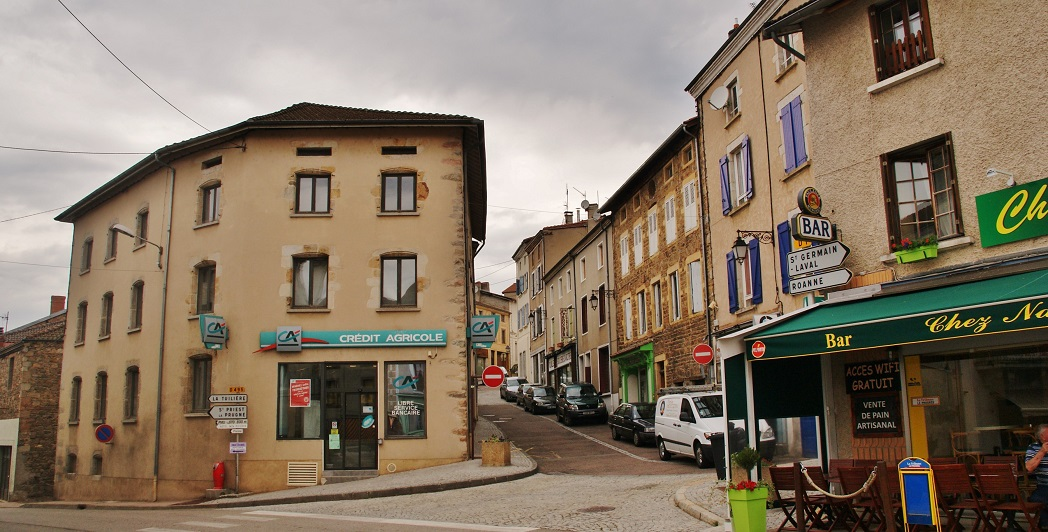

- Coat of arms
- Location of Saint-Just-en-Chevalet
- Location within France Location within Auvergne-Rhône-Alpes
- Coordinates: 45°54′52″N 3°50′48″E
- Country: France
- Region: Auvergne-Rhône-Alpes
- Department: Loire
- Arrondissement: Roanne
- Canton: Renaison
- Intercommunality: Pays d'Urfé

Government
  - Mayor (2024–2026): Emmanuelle Barlerin
- Area^{1}: 29.19 km^{2} (11.27 sq mi)
- Elevation: 630 m (2,070 ft)
- Highest elevation: 983 m (3,225 ft)
- Lowest elevation: 556 m (1,824 ft)
- Population (2023): 1,169
  - Density: 40.05/km^{2} (103.7/sq mi)
- Time zone: UTC+01:00 (CET)
  - Summer (DST): UTC+02:00 (CEST)
- INSEE/Postal code: 42248 /42430
- ^{1} French Land Register data, which excludes lakes, ponds, glaciers > 1 km^{2} (0.386 sq mi or 247 acres) and river estuaries.

Saint-Just-en-Chevalet (French pronunciation: [sɛ̃ ʒy(st) ɑ̃ ʃəvalɛ]) is a commune in the Loire department in central France.

== Population ==
Historical population
Year	Pop.	±% p.a.
1968	1,920	—
1975	1,819	−0.77%
1982	1,575	−2.04%
1990	1,422	−1.27%
1999	1,281	−1.15%
2007	1,199	−0.82%
2012	1,150	−0.83%
2017	1,141	−0.16%
2023	1,169	+0.40%
Source: INSEE

== Media and culture ==
In 1963, American abstract expressionist painter Robert De Niro Sr. lived and worked in Saint-Just-en-Chevalet, where he created several notable paintings, including L'Église de Saint-Just-en-Chevalet. In April 2026, his son, actor Robert De Niro, visited the commune to film a documentary retracing his father's artistic stay in the village.

== See also ==
- Communes of the Loire department
