= René Wenzel =

Danish cyclist coach (born 1960)

Personal information
- Full name: René Wenzel
- Born: 20 April 1960 (age 66) Copenhagen, Denmark

Cycling career
- Sport: Cycling
- Discipline: Road
- Role: Rider & Coach

René Wenzel (born 20 April 1960) is a Danish cycle racing coach, working as a consultant. He is a former coach of USA Cycling's national junior team, Koege Cykel Ring in Denmark, and first cycling teacher at a sports college in Denmark, the Gentofte Studenter Kursus.

== Biography ==
Wenzel went to school at Bispebjerg Skole and Efterslaegtselskabets Gymnasium before moving to Belgium in 1979, and to France in 1980, to race as a professional cyclist. He won the Danish and the Scandinavian junior road championships.

Wenzel contracted mononucleosis in 1980, and took over 18 months out of racing. A racing trip to the Philippines in 1981 gave Wenzel his first taste of coaching when he and friend Stig Larsen worked as assistant coaches for the Philippine National Team. Wenzel spent five years competing in America. He excelled in endurance events on the velodrome.

Wenzel returned to Denmark in 1988, and stopped racing at the end of 1989 after more than 22 years and 300 victories. He returned to America as a national team coach from January 1990 until December 1992 when he was laid off due to the downsizing of team programs. During his employment, the team won two world championships and several silver and bronze medals.

Wenzel became first Danish directeur sportif of a UCI professional team in 1993, when he joined Saturn. In 1994 Saturn changed management and Wenzel left to create Wenzel World Champion Coaching, now Wenzel Coaching. He returned to the expanded Saturn team, renamed Saturn Cycling, as manager and directeur sportif in 1995. Wenzel worked for Saturn Cycling until spring 2000, when together with his wife, Kendra Wenzel, he returned to her native Oregon, where later that year they became parents to daughter Katrine.

Three former athletes, Greg Strock, Erich Kaiter and Gerrik Latta accused Wenzel, along with Chris Carmichael, Cycling USA and Angus Fraser, of treating them with illegal drugs in 1990, feeding them pills and giving them injections, such as cortisone, an immunosuppressant; Greg Strock in 2000, Erich Kaiter later in 2001 and Gerrik Latta. Strock, Kaiter and Latta reportedly made out-of-court settlements with USAC's insurance company on behalf of USAC and René Wenzel. Wenzel continue to deny the charges.

Wenzel's 'Bike Racing 101' written with Kendra was published in May 2003.

Wenzel directed the small Continental team, Subway, in 2004 and in 2005 owned it. Its best result was to win the 2005 Tour of El Salvador.

Kendra and René Wenzel separated in May 2005, and divorced in August 2007.

In November 2007, the Malaysian National Cycling Federation offered Wenzel the position of director of coaching, but it never came to fruition.

Wenzel now (2015) works as a Personal Assistant for the Executive of Business Development at T-Systems Denmark and attend Zealand Institute of Business & Technology for a degree in Leadership & Management.
