= California Western School of Law =

Law school in San Diego, California, U.S.

- Established: 1924; 102 years ago
- School type: Private law school
- Dean: Miriam H. Baer
- Location: San Diego, California, US; 32°43′21″N 117°9′42″W
- Enrollment: 827
- Faculty: 71 (25 tenured)
- USNWR ranking: 175th-194th (2026)(lowest rank)
- Bar pass rate: 68.6% (July 2025 1st time takers)
- Website: www.cwsl.edu
- ABA profile: Standard 509 Report

California Western School of Law (Cal Western or CWSL) is a private law school in San Diego, California. It is one of two successor organizations to California Western University, the other being Alliant International University. The school was founded in 1924, was accredited by the American Bar Association (ABA) in 1962, and became a member of the Association of American Law Schools (AALS) in 1967.

== History ==
California Western is San Diego's oldest law school. It was originally chartered in 1924 by Leland Ghent Stanford as a private graduate institution called Balboa Law College. Balboa Law College expanded to include undergraduate and other graduate studies, and changed its name to Balboa University.

In 1952, Balboa University became affiliated with the Southern California Methodist Conference and changed its name to California Western University, and the law school was relocated to downtown San Diego. In 1960 California Western received approval from the American Bar Association. In 1973, the law school relocated within downtown San Diego to its current downtown campus at 350 Cedar Street. In 1975, the school ended its affiliation with Cal Western's successor school, US International University, and became an independent secular law school. In 1980, the new trimester system was announced, allowing two entering classes per academic year, reducing individual class size and allowing students the opportunity to graduate in two years rather than the standard three.

In January 2000, California Western opened a new law library building at 290 Cedar Street, dedicated by U.S. Supreme Court justice Anthony Kennedy.

Miriam H. Baer was named the school's dean and president in July 2025. Baer is a scholar in the areas of white-collar and corporate crime and is also a member of the American Law Institute and a fellow of the American Bar Foundation.

== Academics ==
The law school teaches the J.D. curriculum plus a dual-degree option, a J.D./Master of Business Administration with San Diego State University (SDSU).

=== Admissions ===
For the class entering in Fall 2025, California Western accepted 46.5% of applicants, with 23.36% of those accepted enrolling. The median LSAT score for program entrants whose scores were reported was 155 and the median undergraduate GPA for program entrants whose grades were reported was 3.50. Fifteen students were not included in the LSAT calculation and four not included in the GPA calculation.

=== Clinics and experiential learning ===
- Innocence and Justice Clinic
- Community Law Project
- New Media Rights
- Trademark Clinic
- Clinical Externship Program
- Pro Bono and Public Service Honors Programs
- Competitive Advocacy Program

=== Faculty ===
CWSL employed 36 full-time faculty during the 2024-25 academic year and another 60 part-time faculty, including local members of the judiciary, practitioners, and public servants.

Full-time faculty are scholars who have published their work in multiple top-50 journals and law reviews, and books with top academic publishers such as Cambridge, University of California, and Oxford University Press. The faculty’s scholarship, which is compiled by the SSRN California Western Legal Research Series Paper Series, has collectively received over 80,000 SSRN downloads and over 700,000 abstract views. On Scholarly Commons, CWSL professors’ work has been downloaded over 1.7 million times, and over 300,000 times in the 2025 calendar year alone.

== Student debt ==
According to the ABA Standard 509 Information Report, 2025 - 2026 annual tuition and fees are $64,870 for full-time students, and $48,590 for part-time students.

== Notable alumni ==
- Anthony J. Battaglia, U.S. district court judge for the Southern District of California
- Scott C. Black, former judge advocate general of the United States Army
- Bruce Blakeman, Nassau County (New York) county executive and commissioner of the Port Authority of New York and New Jersey
- Christina Bobb, attorney for Donald Trump
- Shana Dale, former deputy administrator of NASA
- David Francis, former member of the United States cycling team
- James B. Gibson, former mayor of Henderson, Nevada
- M. James Lorenz, U.S. district court judge for the Southern District of California
- Bruce E. MacDonald, former U.S. Navy vice admiral and judge advocate general of the Navy
- Brian Maienschein, member of the California state assembly
- Afa Ripley Jr., attorney general of American Samoa
- Margaret Catharine Rodgers, United States federal judge
- David Roger, district attorney of Clark County, Nevada
- Kevin Sandkuhler, retired brigadier general in the United States Marine Corps
- Michael Tsai, former minister of national defense, Taiwan
