= Chris Carmichael (cyclist) =

American cyclist (born 1960)

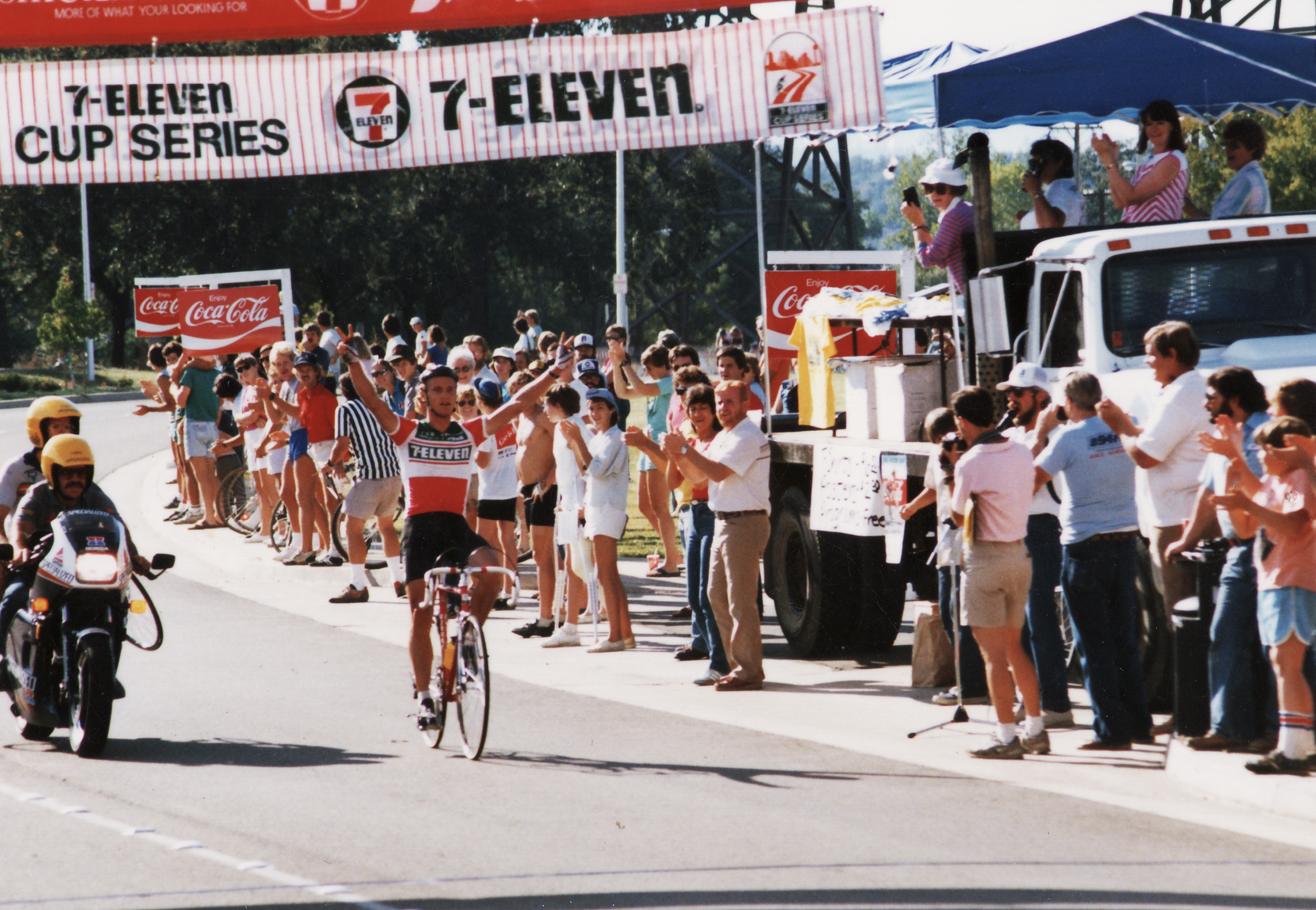

Personal information
- Born: 24 October 1960 (age 65) Miami, Florida, United States

Cycling career
- Sport: Cycling
- Discipline: Road
- Role: Rider

Amateur team
- 1984: US Olympic Cycling Team

Professional teams
- 1985–1987: 7-Eleven
- 1988–1989: Schwinn–Wheaties

Chris Carmichael (born October 24, 1960, in Miami, Florida, United States) is a retired professional cyclist and cycling, triathlon and endurance sports coach. He was a member of the 1984 U.S. Olympic Cycling Team, the 7-Eleven Professional Cycling Team (1985–1987), and the Schwinn-Wheaties professional cycling team (1988–1989). He started coaching with the United States Cycling Federation (now USA Cycling) in 1990, was the U.S. Men's Road Cycling team coach for the 1992 Olympic Games and the U.S. Olympic Cycling Team Head Coach for the 1996 Olympic Games.

== Racing career ==
After getting his start in South Florida, Chris competed for the U.S. National Team at the Junior World Championships in 1978 before moving to Europe to race with the Dutch amateur team Gazelle as well as with the U.S. National Team. After making steady progress in Europe, he qualified for and was selected as a member of the 1984 U.S. Olympic Cycling Team.

Following the 1984 Olympics, Chris turned professional for the 7-Eleven Professional Cycling Team. In 1985 he embarked on the team's first block of European racing, including Milan–San Remo, Tour of Flanders, and the Giro d'Italia. With 7-Eleven in 1986, he was a member of the first American team to race the Tour de France. He was forced to abandon the race on Stage 12 in the Pyrenees due to illness.

In the winter of 1986, Chris suffered a broken femur in a cross-country skiing accident. He raced a shortened season in 1987, but a series of knee surgeries kept him from returning to full strength. In 1988–89, Chris raced domestically in the U.S. for the Schwinn-Wheaties Professional Cycling Team before retiring at the end of the 1989 season.

== Early coaching career ==
In 1990, Chris was a guest coach at a United States Cycling Federation Junior Development Camp. Realizing he had an aptitude for coaching, Chris made the transition to full-time coaching. Chris believed young cyclists needed to race and live in Europe to become successful professional cyclists so, in preparation for the 1992 Olympic Games, he led a group of young American cyclists, including Lance Armstrong, George Hincapie, Freddie Rodriguez, Kevin Livingston, Chann McCrae, and Bobby Julich on a campaign of racing and training in Europe.

Chris was the U.S. Men's Road Cycling team coach for the 1992 Olympic Games. He was named the U.S. National Coaching Director in [year] and led "Project ‘96", a multi-disciplinary effort to put the most technologically and physiologically prepared team on the start line at the 1996 Olympic Games in Atlanta, Georgia. Project ’96 led to major advances in aerodynamics – including the GT Superbike – as well as altitude training, heat acclimatization, and hyperoxic training. Many of the sports science advances made during Project ’96 are still in use at the elite and amateur levels of endurance sports. Chris was the Head Coach of the U.S. Olympic Cycling Team in 1996. In 1997, he joined the Union Cycliste Internationale (UCI), the international governing body for cycling headquartered in Lausanne, Switzerland, as Olympic Solidarity Coaching Instructor. He is well known for being the personal coach to cyclist Lance Armstrong – as well as George Hincapie, ice-hockey player Saku Koivu and swimmer Ed Moses. Athletes under his tutelage have reportedly won a combined total of 33 medals at the Olympics, World Championships, and Pan American Games.

== Major results ==
1984
1st Stage 2 Coors Classic
1985
1st Gastown Grand Prix
1986
1st Stage 3 (TTT) Redlands Bicycle Classic

== Business career ==
Chris Carmichael founded Carmichael Training Systems, Inc. (CTS) in 2000 and was the company's CEO until 2022. In July 2022, he stepped down from the CEO position, which was filled by Jeff Pierce. He remains Executive Chairman of the Board of Directors and functions as the "Chief Endurance Officer" and a coach for the company he founded.

== Honors, Citations, and Prizes ==
- 2013–2014 National Spokesperson for the American Diabetes Association Tour de Cure
- 2014 American Diabetes Association Celebrity Cabinet
- 2011–2014 USA Pro Cycling Challenge – Local Organizing Committee Chair for Colorado Springs (COS hosted stages in 2011, 2012, and 2014)
- 2009 Kennedy Laureate Award, John F. Kennedy University
- 2004 USA Cycling Lifetime Achievement Award
- 2004 Colorado Entrepreneur of the Year, Celebrate Technology
- 2003 US Bicycling Hall of Fame Inductee
- 2000 Outside Magazine "Ultimate Coach" Award
- 1999 US Olympic Committee "Coach of the Year"
- 1999 USA Cycling "Coach of the Year"
- 1999 VeloNews "Coach of the Year"
- 1992, 1996 Olympic Coach, Cycling
- 1986 First American Team in the Tour de France, 7-Eleven
- 1984 Olympic Team Member, Cycling

== Bibliography ==
- The Time Crunched Cyclist, 3rd Edition: Fit, Fast, and Powerful in 6 Hours a Week (Velopress 2017)
- The Time Crunched Triathlete: Race-Winning Fitness in 8 Hours a Week (Velopress, 2010)
- Five Essentials for a Winning Life: The Nutrition, Fitness, and Life Plan for Discovering the Champion Within (Rodale, 2006)
- The Carmichael Training Systems Cyclist's Training Diary (Penguin Putnam, 2005)
- Chris Carmichael's Fitness Cookbook (Penguin Putnam, 2005)
- Chris Carmichael's Food for Fitness: Eat Right to Train Right (Penguin Putnam, 2004) Reached #6 on the New York Times Best Seller List in 2004.
- The Ultimate Ride: Get Fit, Get Fast, and Start Winning with the World's Top Cycling Coach (Penguin Putnam, 2003)
- The Lance Armstrong Performance Program: Seven Weeks to the Perfect Ride (Rodale, 2000; revised 2006)

== Doping controversy ==
Some cyclists he had trained later sued USA Cycling (USAC) for doping them and named him and fellow coach Rene Wenzel in their allegations, Greg Strock in 2000, and Erich Kaiter in 2004. Both reportedly made out-of-court settlements with him but the case against the USAC continued as of April 2006.

In November 2013, Lance Armstrong settled a lawsuit with Acceptance Insurance Company (AIC). AIC had sought to recover $3 million it had paid Armstrong as bonuses for winning the Tour de France from 1999 to 2001. The suit was settled for an undisclosed sum one day before Armstrong was scheduled to give an oral deposition under oath. In a sworn written deposition for the lawsuit, Armstrong stated that he "told Chris Carmichael in 1995 of his use of PEDs."
