= List of teams and cyclists in the 2023 Vuelta a España =

List of cyclists

The following is a list of teams and cyclists who will take part in the 2023 Vuelta a España.

== Teams ==
22 teams are scheduled to take part in the race. All 18 UCI WorldTeams have been automatically invited. They will be joined by 4 UCI ProTeams - the two highest placed UCI ProTeams in 2022 (Lotto–Dstny and Team TotalEnergies), along with Burgos BH and Caja Rural–Seguros RGA who were selected by the organisers. The teams were announced on 8 March 2023.

UCI WorldTeams

- AG2R Citroën Team
- Alpecin–Deceuninck
- Arkéa–Samsic
- Astana Qazaqstan Team
- Bora–Hansgrohe
- Cofidis
- EF Education–EasyPost
- Groupama–FDJ
- Ineos Grenadiers
- Intermarché–Circus–Wanty
- Lidl–Trek
- Movistar Team
- Soudal–Quick-Step
- Team Bahrain Victorious
- Team dsm–firmenich
- Team Jayco–AlUla
- Team Jumbo–Visma
- UAE Team Emirates

UCI ProTeams

- Burgos BH
- Caja Rural–Seguros RGA
- Lotto–Dstny
- Team TotalEnergies

== Cyclists ==
Legend
No.	Starting number worn by the rider during the Vuelta
Pos.	Position in the general classification
Time	Deficit to the winner of the general classification
‡	Denotes riders born on or after 1 January 1998, and thus eligible for the young rider classification
	Denotes the winner of the general classification
	Denotes the winner of the points classification
	Denotes the winner of the mountains classification
	Denotes the winner of the young rider classification
	Denotes the winner of the team classification
	Denotes the winner of the combativity award
DNS	Denotes a rider who did not start, followed by the stage before which he withdrew
DNF	Denotes a rider who did not finish, followed by the stage in which he withdrew
DSQ	Denotes a rider who was disqualified from the race, followed by the stage in which this occurred
OTL	Denotes a rider who finished outside the time limit, followed by the stage in which he did so
COV	Denotes a rider who withdrew because of COVID-19 either because he tested positive or team members tested positive, followed by the stage before which he withdrew
Ages correct as of Saturday 26 August 2023, the date on which the Vuelta began

=== By starting number ===
No.	Name	Nationality	Team	Age	Pos.	Time	Ref.
1	Remco Evenepoel ‡	Belgium	Soudal–Quick-Step	23	12	+ 16' 44"	
2	Andrea Bagioli ‡	Italy	Soudal–Quick-Step	24	DNF-6	–	
3	Mattia Cattaneo	Italy	Soudal–Quick-Step	32	34	+ 1h 51' 42"	
4	Jan Hirt	Czechia	Soudal–Quick-Step	32	59	+ 2h 29' 04"	
5	James Knox	Great Britain	Soudal–Quick-Step	27	65	+ 2h 38' 31"	
6	Casper Pedersen	Denmark	Soudal–Quick-Step	27	140	+ 4h 13' 57"	
7	Pieter Serry	Belgium	Soudal–Quick-Step	34	96	+ 3h 18' 17"	
8	Louis Vervaeke	Belgium	Soudal–Quick-Step	29	33	+ 1h 49' 44"	
11	Juan Ayuso ‡	Spain	UAE Team Emirates	20	4	+ 3' 18"	
12	João Almeida ‡	Portugal	UAE Team Emirates	25	9	+ 10' 08"	
13	Rui Oliveira	Portugal	UAE Team Emirates	26	148	+ 4h 32' 55"	
14	Finn Fisher-Black ‡	New Zealand	UAE Team Emirates	21	40	+ 1h 58' 23"	
15	Juan Sebastián Molano	Colombia	UAE Team Emirates	28	147	+ 4h 27' 41"	
16	Domen Novak	Slovenia	UAE Team Emirates	28	138	+ 4h 08' 58"	
17	Marc Soler	Spain	UAE Team Emirates	29	14	+ 25' 21"	
18	Jay Vine	Australia	UAE Team Emirates	27	DNF-6	–	
21	Primož Roglič	Slovenia	Team Jumbo–Visma	33	3	+ 1' 08"	
22	Robert Gesink	Netherlands	Team Jumbo–Visma	37	52	+ 2h 19' 43"	
23	Wilco Kelderman	Netherlands	Team Jumbo–Visma	32	25	+ 1h 24' 38"	
24	Sepp Kuss	United States	Team Jumbo–Visma	28	1	76h 48' 21"	
25	Jan Tratnik	Slovenia	Team Jumbo–Visma	33	38	+ 1h 57' 16"	
26	Attila Valter ‡	Hungary	Team Jumbo–Visma	25	22	+ 1h 05' 42"	
27	Dylan van Baarle	Netherlands	Team Jumbo–Visma	31	88	+ 3h 02' 37"	
28	Jonas Vingegaard	Denmark	Team Jumbo–Visma	26	2	+ 17"	
31	Geraint Thomas	Great Britain	Ineos Grenadiers	37	31	+ 1h 47' 59"	
32	Thymen Arensman ‡	Netherlands	Ineos Grenadiers	23	DNF-7	–	
33	Egan Bernal	Colombia	Ineos Grenadiers	26	55	+ 2h 22' 50"	
34	Jonathan Castroviejo	Spain	Ineos Grenadiers	36	60	+ 2h 29' 11"	
35	Laurens De Plus	Belgium	Ineos Grenadiers	27	DNF-1	–	
36	Filippo Ganna	Italy	Ineos Grenadiers	27	104	+ 3h 29' 23"	
37	Omar Fraile	Spain	Ineos Grenadiers	33	115	+ 3h 43' 40"	
38	Kim Heiduk ‡	Germany	Ineos Grenadiers	23	139	+ 4h 10' 09"	
41	Santiago Buitrago ‡	Colombia	Team Bahrain Victorious	23	10	+ 11' 38"	
42	Damiano Caruso	Italy	Team Bahrain Victorious	35	19	+ 53' 47"	
43	Matevž Govekar ‡	Slovenia	Team Bahrain Victorious	23	133	+ 4h 04' 42"	
44	Kamil Gradek	Poland	Team Bahrain Victorious	32	130	+ 4h 00' 43"	
45	Mikel Landa	Spain	Team Bahrain Victorious	33	5	+ 3' 37"	
46	Wout Poels	Netherlands	Team Bahrain Victorious	35	15	+ 31' 00"	
47	Jasha Sütterlin	Germany	Team Bahrain Victorious	30	71	+ 2h 46' 56"	
48	Antonio Tiberi ‡	Italy	Team Bahrain Victorious	22	18	+ 50' 13"	
51	Juan Pedro López	Spain	Lidl–Trek	26	17	+ 35' 47"	
52	Julien Bernard	France	Lidl–Trek	31	68	+ 2h 43' 57"	
53	Kenny Elissonde	France	Lidl–Trek	32	50	+ 2h 18' 25"	
54	Amanuel Ghebreigzabhier	Eritrea	Lidl–Trek	29	82	+ 2h 57' 43"	
55	Bauke Mollema	Netherlands	Lidl–Trek	36	79	+ 2h 51' 48"	
56	Jacopo Mosca	Italy	Lidl–Trek	30	92	+ 3h 13' 12"	
57	Edward Theuns	Belgium	Lidl–Trek	32	128	+ 3h 58' 20"	
58	Otto Vergaerde	Belgium	Lidl–Trek	29	113	+ 3h 42' 47"	
61	Rudy Molard	France	Groupama–FDJ	33	29	+ 1h 33' 14"	
62	Lenny Martinez ‡	France	Groupama–FDJ	20	24	+ 1h 21' 41"	
63	Lewis Askey ‡	Great Britain	Groupama–FDJ	22	105	+ 3h 34' 07"	
64	Clément Davy ‡	France	Groupama–FDJ	25	135	+ 4h 07' 49"	
65	Lorenzo Germani ‡	Italy	Groupama–FDJ	21	85	+ 3h 01' 05"	
66	Romain Grégoire ‡	France	Groupama–FDJ	20	42	+ 2h 01' 38"	
67	Michael Storer	Australia	Groupama–FDJ	26	45	+ 2h 13' 42"	
68	Samuel Watson ‡	Great Britain	Groupama–FDJ	21	123	+ 3h 56' 03"	
71	Aleksandr Vlasov		Bora–Hansgrohe	27	7	+ 7' 53"	
72	Nico Denz	Germany	Bora–Hansgrohe	29	97	+ 3h 20' 12"	
73	Emanuel Buchmann	Germany	Bora–Hansgrohe	30	20	+ 59' 02"	
74	Sergio Higuita	Colombia	Bora–Hansgrohe	26	43	+ 2h 08' 05"	
75	Lennard Kämna	Germany	Bora–Hansgrohe	26	30	+ 1h 38' 06"	
76	Jonas Koch	Germany	Bora–Hansgrohe	30	93	+ 3h 16' 08"	
77	Cian Uijtdebroeks ‡	Belgium	Bora–Hansgrohe	20	8	+ 8' 00"	
78	Ben Zwiehoff	Germany	Bora–Hansgrohe	29	35	+ 1h 52' 28"	
81	Kaden Groves ‡	Australia	Alpecin–Deceuninck	24	122	+ 3h 55' 48"	
82	Maurice Ballerstedt ‡	Germany	Alpecin–Deceuninck	22	143	+ 4h 22' 11"	
83	Tobias Bayer ‡	Austria	Alpecin–Deceuninck	23	141	+ 4h 15' 43"	
84	Samuel Gaze	New Zealand	Alpecin–Deceuninck	27	DNF-8	–	
85	Robbe Ghys	Belgium	Alpecin–Deceuninck	26	DNS-13	–	
86	Jimmy Janssens	Belgium	Alpecin–Deceuninck	34	112	+ 3h 42' 07"	
87	Jason Osborne	Germany	Alpecin–Deceuninck	29	131	+ 4h 01' 48"	
88	Edward Planckaert	Belgium	Alpecin–Deceuninck	28	136	+ 4h 07' 53"	
91	Thomas De Gendt	Belgium	Lotto–Dstny	36	99	+ 3h 22' 23"	
92	Jarrad Drizners ‡	Australia	Lotto–Dstny	24	145	+ 4h 25' 50"	
93	Sébastien Grignard ‡	Belgium	Lotto–Dstny	24	118	+ 3h 52' 09"	
94	Andreas Kron ‡	Denmark	Lotto–Dstny	25	67	+ 2h 41' 49"	
95	Milan Menten	Belgium	Lotto–Dstny	26	142	+ 4h 16' 43"	
96	Sylvain Moniquet ‡	Belgium	Lotto–Dstny	25	94	+ 3h 16' 23"	
97	Eduardo Sepúlveda	Argentina	Lotto–Dstny	32	102	+ 3h 26' 22"	
98	Lennert Van Eetvelt ‡	Belgium	Lotto–Dstny	22	32	+ 1h 48' 52"	
101	Hugh Carthy	Great Britain	EF Education–EasyPost	29	23	+ 1h 19' 25"	
102	Stefan Bissegger ‡	Switzerland	EF Education–EasyPost	24	117	+ 3h 49' 54"	
103	Jonathan Kléver Caicedo	Ecuador	EF Education–EasyPost	30	47	+ 2h 15' 49"	
104	Diego Andrés Camargo ‡	Colombia	EF Education–EasyPost	25	84	+ 3h 00' 24"	
105	Andrea Piccolo ‡	Italy	EF Education–EasyPost	22	69	+ 2h 44' 14"	
106	Sean Quinn ‡	United States	EF Education–EasyPost	23	80	+ 2h 52' 02"	
107	Marijn van den Berg ‡	Netherlands	EF Education–EasyPost	24	126	+ 3h 57' 58"	
108	Julius van den Berg	Netherlands	EF Education–EasyPost	26	120	+ 3h 55' 05"	
111	Mikaël Cherel	France	AG2R Citroën Team	37	56	+ 2h 24' 19"	
112	Geoffrey Bouchard	France	AG2R Citroën Team	31	DNF-17	–	
113	Dorian Godon	France	AG2R Citroën Team	27	51	+ 2h 19' 07"	
114	Paul Lapeira ‡	France	AG2R Citroën Team	23	109	+ 3h 37' 49"	
115	Damien Touzé	France	AG2R Citroën Team	27	DNS-19	–	
116	Andrea Vendrame	Italy	AG2R Citroën Team	29	95	+ 3h 17' 26"	
117	Larry Warbasse	United States	AG2R Citroën Team	33	44	+ 2h 09' 29"	
118	Nicolas Prodhomme	France	AG2R Citroën Team	26	27	+ 1h 29' 05"	
121	Eddie Dunbar	Ireland	Team Jayco–AlUla	26	DNF-5	–	
122	Felix Engelhardt ‡	Germany	Team Jayco–AlUla	23	70	+ 2h 44' 35"	
123	Welay Berhe ‡	Ethiopia	Team Jayco–AlUla	21	DNS-16	–	
124	Michael Hepburn	Australia	Team Jayco–AlUla	32	DNF-6	–	
125	Jan Maas	Netherlands	Team Jayco–AlUla	27	137	+ 4h 08' 47"	
126	Callum Scotson	Australia	Team Jayco–AlUla	27	DNF-13	–	
127	Matteo Sobrero	Italy	Team Jayco–AlUla	26	86	+ 3h 01' 23"	
128	Filippo Zana ‡	Italy	Team Jayco–AlUla	24	DNF-5	–	
131	Rui Costa	Portugal	Intermarché–Circus–Wanty	36	41	+ 1h 59' 20"	
132	Kobe Goossens	Belgium	Intermarché–Circus–Wanty	27	DNS-5	–	
133	Rune Herregodts ‡	Belgium	Intermarché–Circus–Wanty	25	DNF-16	–	
134	Julius Johansen ‡	Denmark	Intermarché–Circus–Wanty	23	98	+ 3h 20' 38"	
135	Hugo Page ‡	France	Intermarché–Circus–Wanty	22	127	+ 3h 58' 16"	
136	Rein Taaramäe	Estonia	Intermarché–Circus–Wanty	36	DNF-14	–	
137	Simone Petilli ‡	Italy	Intermarché–Circus–Wanty	30	58	+ 2h 27' 46"	
138	Boy van Poppel	Netherlands	Intermarché–Circus–Wanty	35	124	+ 3h 56' 20"	
141	Enric Mas	Spain	Movistar Team	28	6	+ 4' 14"	
142	Jorge Arcas	Spain	Movistar Team	31	87	+ 3h 01' 28"	
143	Ruben Guerreiro	Portugal	Movistar Team	29	DNS-5	–	
144	Imanol Erviti	Spain	Movistar Team	39	78	+ 2h 51' 33"	
145	Iván García	Spain	Movistar Team	27	72	+ 2h 47' 04"	
146	Oier Lazkano ‡	Spain	Movistar Team	23	81	+ 2h 56' 45"	
147	Nelson Oliveira	Portugal	Movistar Team	34	53	+ 2h 20' 10"	
148	Einer Rubio ‡	Colombia	Movistar Team	25	16	+ 34' 49"	
151	Jesús Herrada	Spain	Cofidis	33	83	+ 2h 59' 47"	
152	Davide Cimolai	Italy	Cofidis	34	146	+ 4h 26' 25"	
153	François Bidard	France	Cofidis	31	125	+ 3h 57' 47"	
154	André Carvalho	Portugal	Cofidis	25	134	+ 4h 05' 13"	
155	Bryan Coquard	France	Cofidis	31	DNS-5	–	
156	Rubén Fernández	Spain	Cofidis	32	54	+ 2h 21' 26"	
157	José Herrada	Spain	Cofidis	37	132	+ 4h 04' 20"	
158	Rémy Rochas	France	Cofidis	27	28	+ 1h 29' 27"	
161	Romain Bardet	France	Team dsm–firmenich	32	21	+ 1h 02' 10"	
162	Romain Combaud	France	Team dsm–firmenich	32	119	+ 3h 52' 10"	
163	Alberto Dainese ‡	Italy	Team dsm–firmenich	25	144	+ 4h 25' 39"	
164	Sean Flynn ‡	Great Britain	Team dsm–firmenich	23	116	+ 3h 46' 39"	
165	Chris Hamilton	Australia	Team dsm–firmenich	28	63	+ 2h 36' 47"	
166	Lorenzo Milesi ‡	Italy	Team dsm–firmenich	21	DNF-6	–	
167	Oscar Onley ‡	Great Britain	Team dsm–firmenich	20	DNF-2	–	
168	Max Poole ‡	Great Britain	Team dsm–firmenich	20	49	+ 2h 17' 18"	
171	Kévin Vauquelin ‡	France	Arkéa–Samsic	22	DNF-15	–	
172	Élie Gesbert	France	Arkéa–Samsic	28	73	+ 2h 48' 24"	
173	Hugo Hofstetter	France	Arkéa–Samsic	29	111	+ 3h 41' 43"	
174	Mathis Le Berre ‡	France	Arkéa–Samsic	22	90	+ 3h 11' 23"	
175	Kévin Ledanois	France	Arkéa–Samsic	30	103	+ 3h 29' 13"	
176	Łukasz Owsian	Poland	Arkéa–Samsic	33	75	+ 2h 49' 48"	
177	Michel Ries ‡	Luxembourg	Arkéa–Samsic	25	66	+ 2h 38' 52"	
178	Cristián Rodríguez	Spain	Arkéa–Samsic	28	13	+ 22' 13"	
181	Steff Cras	Belgium	Team TotalEnergies	27	11	+ 14' 04"	
182	Thomas Bonnet ‡	France	Team TotalEnergies	24	DNF-16	–	
183	Fabien Doubey	France	Team TotalEnergies	29	36	+ 1h 56' 08"	
184	Alan Jousseaume ‡	France	Team TotalEnergies	25	DNS-13	–	
185	Pierre Latour	France	Team TotalEnergies	29	DNF-8	–	
186	Paul Ourselin	France	Team TotalEnergies	29	26	+ 1h 28' 13"	
187	Geoffrey Soupe	France	Team TotalEnergies	35	101	+ 3h 25' 38"	
188	Dries Van Gestel	Belgium	Team TotalEnergies	28	107	+ 3h 35' 34"	
191	Samuele Battistella ‡	Italy	Astana Qazaqstan Team	24	121	+ 3h 55' 44"	
192	David de la Cruz	Spain	Astana Qazaqstan Team	34	DNS-16	–	
193	Luis León Sánchez	Spain	Astana Qazaqstan Team	39	61	+ 2h 36' 29"	
194	Javier Romo ‡	Spain	Astana Qazaqstan Team	24	DNS-10	–	
195	Joe Dombrowski	United States	Astana Qazaqstan Team	32	57	+ 2h 26' 13"	
196	Vadim Pronskiy ‡	Kazakhstan	Astana Qazaqstan Team	25	91	+ 3h 12' 40"	
197	Fabio Felline	Italy	Astana Qazaqstan Team	33	76	+ 2h 50' 18"	
198	Andrey Zeits	Kazakhstan	Astana Qazaqstan Team	36	46	+ 2h 14' 13"	
201	José Manuel Díaz	Spain	Burgos BH	28	64	+ 2h 37' 04"	
202	Cyril Barthe	France	Burgos BH	27	108	+ 3h 37' 20"	
203	Jetse Bol	Netherlands	Burgos BH	33	110	+ 3h 38' 49"	
204	Jesús Ezquerra	Spain	Burgos BH	32	89	+ 3h 05' 57"	
205	Eric Fagúndez ‡	Uruguay	Burgos BH	25	129	+ 4h 00' 37"	
206	Daniel Navarro	Spain	Burgos BH	40	39	+ 1h 57' 40"	
207	Ander Okamika	Spain	Burgos BH	30	62	+ 2h 36' 34"	
208	Pelayo Sánchez ‡	Spain	Burgos BH	23	37	+ 1h 56' 27"	
211	Orluis Aular	Venezuela	Caja Rural–Seguros RGA	26	DNS-13	–	
212	Abel Balderstone ‡	Spain	Caja Rural–Seguros RGA	23	77	+ 2h 50' 22"	
213	Fernando Barceló	Spain	Caja Rural–Seguros RGA	27	48	+ 2h 17' 00"	
214	Jon Barrenetxea ‡	Spain	Caja Rural–Seguros RGA	23	74	+ 2h 48' 51"	
215	Jefferson Alveiro Cepeda	Ecuador	Caja Rural–Seguros RGA	27	DNS-10	–	
216	David González	Spain	Caja Rural–Seguros RGA	27	106	+ 3h 35' 12"	
217	Joel Nicolau	Spain	Caja Rural–Seguros RGA	25	100	+ 3h 25' 22"	
218	Michal Schlegel	Czechia	Caja Rural–Seguros RGA	28	114	+ 3h 43' 03"	

=== By team ===
(Belgium) Soudal–Quick-Step (SOQ)
No.	Rider	Pos.
1	Remco Evenepoel (BEL)	12
2	Andrea Bagioli (ITA)	DNF-6
3	Mattia Cattaneo (ITA)	34
4	Jan Hirt (CZE)	59
5	James Knox (GBR)	65
6	Casper Pedersen (DEN)	140
7	Pieter Serry (BEL)	96
8	Louis Vervaeke (BEL)	33

(United Arab Emirates) UAE Team Emirates (UAD)
No.	Rider	Pos.
11	Juan Ayuso (ESP)	4
12	João Almeida (POR)	9
13	Rui Oliveira (POR)	148
14	Finn Fisher-Black (NZL)	40
15	Juan Sebastián Molano (COL)	147
16	Domen Novak (SLO)	138
17	Marc Soler (ESP)	14
18	Jay Vine (AUS)	DNF-6

(Netherlands) Team Jumbo–Visma (TJV)
No.	Rider	Pos.
21	Primož Roglič (SLO)	3
22	Robert Gesink (NED)	52
23	Wilco Kelderman (NED)	25
24	Sepp Kuss (USA)	1
25	Jan Tratnik (SLO)	38
26	Attila Valter (HUN)	22
27	Dylan van Baarle (NED)	88
28	Jonas Vingegaard (DEN)	2

(United Kingdom) Ineos Grenadiers (IGD)
No.	Rider	Pos.
31	Geraint Thomas (GBR)	31
32	Thymen Arensman (NED)	DNF-7
33	Egan Bernal (COL)	55
34	Jonathan Castroviejo (ESP)	60
35	Laurens De Plus (BEL)	DNF-1
36	Filippo Ganna (ITA)	104
37	Omar Fraile (ESP)	115
38	Kim Heiduk (GER)	139

Team Bahrain Victorious (TBV)
No.	Rider	Pos.
41	Santiago Buitrago (COL)	10
42	Damiano Caruso (ITA)	19
43	Matevž Govekar (SLO)	133
44	Kamil Gradek (POL)	130
45	Mikel Landa (ESP)	5
46	Wout Poels (NED)	15
47	Jasha Sütterlin (GER)	71
48	Antonio Tiberi (ITA)	18

(United States) Lidl–Trek (LTK)
No.	Rider	Pos.
51	Juan Pedro López (ESP)	17
52	Julien Bernard (FRA)	68
53	Kenny Elissonde (FRA)	50
54	Amanuel Ghebreigzabhier (ERI)	82
55	Bauke Mollema (NED)	79
56	Jacopo Mosca (ITA)	92
57	Edward Theuns (BEL)	128
58	Otto Vergaerde (BEL)	113

(France) Groupama–FDJ (GFC)
No.	Rider	Pos.
61	Rudy Molard (FRA)	29
62	Lenny Martinez (FRA)	24
63	Lewis Askey (GBR)	105
64	Clément Davy (FRA)	135
65	Lorenzo Germani (ITA)	85
66	Romain Grégoire (FRA)	42
67	Michael Storer (AUS)	45
68	Samuel Watson (GBR)	123

(Germany) Bora–Hansgrohe (BOH)
No.	Rider	Pos.
71	Aleksandr Vlasov	7
72	Nico Denz (GER)	97
73	Emanuel Buchmann (GER)	20
74	Sergio Higuita (COL)	43
75	Lennard Kämna (GER)	30
76	Jonas Koch (GER)	93
77	Cian Uijtdebroeks (BEL)	8
78	Ben Zwiehoff (GER)	35

(Belgium) Alpecin–Deceuninck (ADC)
No.	Rider	Pos.
81	Kaden Groves (AUS)	122
82	Maurice Ballerstedt (GER)	143
83	Tobias Bayer (AUT)	141
84	Samuel Gaze (NZL)	DNF-8
85	Robbe Ghys (BEL)	DNS-13
86	Jimmy Janssens (BEL)	112
87	Jason Osborne (GER)	131
88	Edward Planckaert (BEL)	136

(Belgium) Lotto–Dstny (LTD)
No.	Rider	Pos.
91	Thomas De Gendt (BEL)	99
92	Jarrad Drizners (AUS)	145
93	Sébastien Grignard (BEL)	118
94	Andreas Kron (DEN)	67
95	Milan Menten (BEL)	142
96	Sylvain Moniquet (BEL)	94
97	Eduardo Sepúlveda (ARG)	102
98	Lennert Van Eetvelt (BEL)	32

(United States) EF Education–EasyPost (EFE)
No.	Rider	Pos.
101	Hugh Carthy (GBR)	23
102	Stefan Bissegger (SUI)	117
103	Jonathan Kléver Caicedo (ECU)	47
104	Diego Andrés Camargo (COL)	84
105	Andrea Piccolo (ITA)	69
106	Sean Quinn (USA)	80
107	Marijn van den Berg (NED)	126
108	Julius van den Berg (NED)	120

(France) AG2R Citroën Team (ACT)
No.	Rider	Pos.
111	Mikaël Cherel (FRA)	56
112	Geoffrey Bouchard (FRA)	DNF-17
113	Dorian Godon (FRA)	51
114	Paul Lapeira (FRA)	109
115	Damien Touzé (FRA)	DNS-19
116	Andrea Vendrame (ITA)	95
117	Larry Warbasse (USA)	44
118	Nicolas Prodhomme (FRA)	27

(Australia) Team Jayco–AlUla (JAY)
No.	Rider	Pos.
121	Eddie Dunbar (IRL)	DNF-5
122	Felix Engelhardt (GER)	70
123	Welay Berhe (ETH)	DNS-16
124	Michael Hepburn (AUS)	DNF-6
125	Jan Maas (NED)	137
126	Callum Scotson (AUS)	DNF-13
127	Matteo Sobrero (ITA)	86
128	Filippo Zana (ITA)	DNF-5

(Belgium) Intermarché–Circus–Wanty (ICW)
No.	Rider	Pos.
131	Rui Costa (POR)	41
132	Kobe Goossens (BEL)	DNS-5
133	Rune Herregodts (BEL)	DNF-16
134	Julius Johansen (DEN)	98
135	Hugo Page (FRA)	127
136	Rein Taaramäe (EST)	DNF-14
137	Simone Petilli (ITA)	58
138	Boy van Poppel (NED)	124

(Spain) Movistar Team (MOV)
No.	Rider	Pos.
141	Enric Mas (ESP)	6
142	Jorge Arcas (ESP)	87
143	Ruben Guerreiro (POR)	DNS-5
144	Imanol Erviti (ESP)	78
145	Iván García (ESP)	72
146	Oier Lazkano (ESP)	81
147	Nelson Oliveira (POR)	53
148	Einer Rubio (COL)	16

(France) Cofidis (COF)
No.	Rider	Pos.
151	Jesús Herrada (ESP)	83
152	Davide Cimolai (ITA)	146
153	François Bidard (FRA)	125
154	André Carvalho (POR)	134
155	Bryan Coquard (FRA)	DNS-5
156	Rubén Fernández (ESP)	54
157	José Herrada (ESP)	132
158	Rémy Rochas (FRA)	28

(Netherlands) Team dsm–firmenich (DSM)
No.	Rider	Pos.
161	Romain Bardet (FRA)	21
162	Romain Combaud (FRA)	119
163	Alberto Dainese (ITA)	144
164	Sean Flynn (GBR)	116
165	Chris Hamilton (AUS)	63
166	Lorenzo Milesi (ITA)	DNF-6
167	Oscar Onley (GBR)	DNF-2
168	Max Poole (GBR)	49

(France) Arkéa–Samsic (ARK)
No.	Rider	Pos.
171	Kévin Vauquelin (FRA)	DNF-15
172	Élie Gesbert (FRA)	73
173	Hugo Hofstetter (FRA)	111
174	Mathis Le Berre (FRA)	90
175	Kévin Ledanois (FRA)	103
176	Łukasz Owsian (POL)	75
177	Michel Ries (LUX)	66
178	Cristián Rodríguez (ESP)	13

(France) Team TotalEnergies (TEN)
No.	Rider	Pos.
181	Steff Cras (BEL)	11
182	Thomas Bonnet (FRA)	DNF-16
183	Fabien Doubey (FRA)	36
184	Alan Jousseaume (FRA)	DNS-13
185	Pierre Latour (FRA)	DNF-8
186	Paul Ourselin (FRA)	26
187	Geoffrey Soupe (FRA)	101
188	Dries Van Gestel (BEL)	107

(Kazakhstan) Astana Qazaqstan Team (AST)
No.	Rider	Pos.
191	Samuele Battistella (ITA)	121
192	David de la Cruz (ESP)	DNS-16
193	Luis León Sánchez (ESP)	61
194	Javier Romo (ESP)	DNS-10
195	Joe Dombrowski (USA)	57
196	Vadim Pronskiy (KAZ)	91
197	Fabio Felline (ITA)	76
198	Andrey Zeits (KAZ)	46

(Spain) Burgos BH (BBH)
No.	Rider	Pos.
201	José Manuel Díaz (ESP)	64
202	Cyril Barthe (FRA)	108
203	Jetse Bol (NED)	110
204	Jesús Ezquerra (ESP)	89
205	Eric Antonio Fagundez (URU)	129
206	Daniel Navarro (ESP)	39
207	Ander Okamika (ESP)	62
208	Pelayo Sánchez (ESP)	37

(Spain) Caja Rural–Seguros RGA (CJR)
No.	Rider	Pos.
211	Orluis Aular (VEN)	DNS-13
212	Abel Balderstone (ESP)	77
213	Fernando Barceló (ESP)	48
214	Jon Barrenetxea (ESP)	74
215	Jefferson Alveiro Cepeda (ECU)	DNS-10
216	David González (ESP)	106
217	Joel Nicolau (ESP)	100
218	Michal Schlegel (CZE)	114

=== By nationality ===
Country	No. of riders	Finishers	Stage wins
Argentina	1	1	
Australia	7	4	3 (Kaden Groves x3)
Austria	1	1	
Belgium	19	15	3 (Remco Evenepoel x3)
Colombia	6	6	1 (Juan Sebastián Molano)
Czechia	2	2	
Denmark	4	4	3 (Andreas Kron, Jonas Vingegaard x2)
Ecuador	2	1	
Eritrea	1	1	
Estonia	1	0	
Ethiopia	1	0	
France	30	23	1 (Geoffrey Soupe)
Germany	10	10	1 (Lennard Kämna)
Great Britain	8	7	
Hungary	1	1	
Ireland	1	0	
Italy	17	14	2 (Alberto Dainese, Filippo Ganna)
Kazakhstan	2	2	
Luxembourg	1	1	
Netherlands	11	10	1 (Wout Poels)
New Zealand	2	1	
Poland	2	2	
Portugal	6	5	1 (Rui Costa)
Slovenia	4	4	2 (Primož Roglič x2)
Spain	28	26	1 (Jesús Herrada)
Switzerland	1	1	
United States	4	4	1 (Sepp Kuss)
Uruguay	1	1	
Venezuela	1	0	
	1	1	
Total	176	148	20
