= 2023 Vuelta a España, Stage 1 to Stage 11 =

Vuelta a España stages (cycling)

The 2023 Vuelta a España is the 78th edition of Vuelta a España, one of cycling's Grand Tours. The Vuelta began in Barcelona on 26 August, and Stage 11 from Lerma to La Laguna Negra will occur on 6 September. The race will finish in Madrid on 17 September.

== Classification standings ==
Legend
Denotes the leader of the general classification	Denotes the leader of the young rider classification
Denotes the leader of the points classification	Denotes the leader of the team classification
Denotes the leader of the mountains classification	Denotes the winner of the combativity award

== Stage 1 ==
26 August 2023 – Barcelona to Barcelona, 14.8 km (9.2 mi) (TTT)

The first stage of the Vuelta was a largely flat time trial in Barcelona, beginning on La Playa de la Barceloneta and finishing on Avinguda de la Reina Maria, near The Four Columns. The flat course was technical, with 18 turns throughout. The race began at 18:55 with Caja Rural-Seguros RGA and concluded with defending champion's Soudal–Quick-Step, who started at 20:19 and arrived at 20:36.

There was substantial controversy following the race, due to darkness (the sunset occurred before the race ended, at 20:33) and aggravating rain, which meant that most race favorites had to ride in both slippery and low visibility condition, as opposed to teams with an early start. Team DSM–Firmenich, starting on second position, achieved the quickest time of the race, while several crashes occurred later in the race (including Laurens De Plus, who had to retire from the race as a result).

Multiple riders questioned the decision to hold the race in the late evening, with defending champion Remco Evenepoel saying that "[they] couldn't see anything" in the dark and that the conditions were "ridiculous". Race director Javier Guillén responded, saying that the time trial was confounded by events beyond the control of the race. “Conditions yesterday surprised everyone. The darkness that came was the result of a storm that forecasts didn’t indicate would be of that magnitude...and concerning what Evenepoel said, we remind everyone that the safety of the riders is paramount. We couldn’t do anything about the dark conditions, it was something that ensued, and could not have been expected”.

Stage 1 result
Rank	Team	Time
1	(Netherlands) Team DSM–Firmenich	17' 30"
2	(Spain) Movistar Team	+ 0"
3	(United States) EF Education–EasyPost	+ 6"
4	(Belgium) Soudal–Quick-Step	+ 6"
5	(France) Groupama–FDJ	+ 6"
6	Team Bahrain Victorious	+ 10"
7	(Kazakhstan) Astana Qazaqstan Team	+ 17"
8	(United Kingdom) Ineos Grenadiers	+ 20"
9	(France) Cofidis	+ 22"
10	(Germany) Bora–Hansgrohe	+ 28"

General classification after stage 1
Rank	Rider	Team	Time
1	Lorenzo Milesi (ITA)	Team DSM–Firmenich	17' 30"
2	Max Poole (GBR)	Team DSM–Firmenich	+ 0"
3	Romain Bardet (FRA)	Team DSM–Firmenich	+ 0"
4	Sean Flynn (GBR)	Team DSM–Firmenich	+ 0"
5	Oscar Onley (GBR)	Team DSM–Firmenich	+ 0"
6	Chris Hamilton (AUS)	Team DSM–Firmenich	+ 0"
7	Enric Mas (ESP)	Movistar Team	+ 0"
8	Einer Rubio (COL)	Movistar Team	+ 0"
9	Ruben Guerreiro (POR)	Movistar Team	+ 0"
10	Iván García Cortina (ESP)	Movistar Team	+ 0"

== Stage 2 ==
27 August 2023 – Mataró to Barcelona, 182 km (113 mi)

Due to poor weather conditions, the general classification timing for the stage was taken 9 kilometres from the finish, prior to the technical Alto del Castillo de Monjuic.

Although most of the 181.3 kilometre distance was travelled at a reasonably slow pace, multiple riders crashed, including race leader Lorenzo Milesi, Primož Roglič, and Geraint Thomas. Oscar Onley of Team DSM–Firmenich abandoned the race as a result of injuries he sustained after a crash. Multiple favourites, including Jonas Vingegaard and Remco Evenepoel, encouraged the peloton to slow down as a result.

Andreas Kron pulled off a late attack to win the stage amid emotional scenes for his team, Lotto–Dstny. Kron attacked on the Montjuic hill and held off the chasing pack to secure what was a powerful triumph, given the death of Lotto–Dstny Development Team rider Tijl de Decker earlier that week. Kaden Groves of Alpecin–Deceuninck came over the line second, ahead of Andrea Vendrame of AG2R Citroën Team.

Stage 2 result
Rank	Rider	Team	Time
1	Andreas Kron (DEN)	Lotto–Dstny	4h 10' 25"
2	Kaden Groves (AUS)	Alpecin–Deceuninck	+ 0"
3	Andrea Vendrame (ITA)	AG2R Citroën Team	+ 0"
4	Andrea Bagioli (ITA)	Soudal–Quick-Step	+ 0"
5	Fernando Barcelo (ESP)	Caja Rural–Seguros RGA	+ 0"
6	Iván García Cortina (ESP)	Movistar Team	+ 0"
7	Romain Grégoire (FRA)	Groupama–FDJ	+ 0"
8	Lennert Van Eetvelt (BEL)	Lotto–Dstny	+ 0"
9	Marijn van den Berg (NED)	EF Education–EasyPost	+ 0"
10	Kobe Goossens (BEL)	Intermarché–Circus–Wanty	+ 0"

General classification after stage 2
Rank	Rider	Team	Time
1	Andrea Piccolo (ITA)	EF Education–EasyPost	4h 27' 23"
2	Javier Romo (ESP)	Astana Qazaqstan Team	+ 11"
3	Iván García Cortina (ESP)	Movistar Team	+ 13"
4	Romain Bardet (FRA)	Team DSM–Firmenich	+ 13"
5	Max Poole (GBR)	Team DSM–Firmenich	+ 13"
6	Nelson Oliveira (POR)	Movistar Team	+ 13"
7	Imanol Erviti (ESP)	Movistar Team	+ 13"
8	Enric Mas (ESP)	Movistar Team	+ 13"
9	Einer Rubio (COL)	Movistar Team	+ 13"
10	Sean Flynn (GBR)	Team DSM–Firmenich	+ 13"

== Stage 3 ==
28 August 2023 – Súria to Arinsal (Andorra), 158.5 km (98.5 mi)

There were multiple attacks to begin the race. Notable riders, including Kenny Elissonde, Eduardo Sepulveda, Julius Johansen, and Eric Fagundez, attacked at the 33 kilometre mark. Sepulveda then surged ahead on his own after the group was brought back together. Amanuel Gehbreigzabhier and Pierre Latour bridged to Sepulveda, and were followed by Damiano Caruso, Jasha Sütterlin, Lennard Kämna, Andrea Vendrame, Rune Herregodts, Jon Barrenetxea, Mathis Le Berre, and José Manuel Díaz, forming a breakaway that established a margin of over 5 minutes from the chasing peloton.

The group then narrowed to only Kämna and Caruso at the base of the final Arinsal climb (8.3 kilometres at 7.7%). Kämna made several attempts to distance himself from Caruso during the ascent. In the last 3 kilometres, he successfully distanced Caruso, but was nevertheless soon caught by the peloton, which was paced viciously by Jay Vine. The rest of the stage featured a series of attacks from the lead group, which had thinned substantially during the Arinsal climb. Juan Ayuso attacked first, but was quickly countered by Sepp Kuss. Marc Soler then surged ahead and took the lead, as Geraint Thomas, a favourite for the podium, fell behind the lead group. Remco Evenepoel launched his sprint in the final 300 meters. Jonas Vingegaard was unable to keep pace, and the defending champion secured victory by a second ahead of his rivals. Evenepoel’s celebrations were short-lived, though, as he crashed after crossing the finish line, leaving him bleeding from a cut on his eyebrow. Caruso was awarded the most combative prize for the stage.

There was a significant shake-up in the overall standings, with Andrea Piccolo relinquishing his advantage having been distanced by the peloton during the stage. Evenepoel, Enric Mas and Lenny Martinez became the top three riders in the rankings for the red leader’s jersey, with Vingegaard in fourth.

Stage 3 result
Rank	Rider	Team	Time
1	Remco Evenepoel (BEL)	Soudal–Quick-Step	4h 15' 39"
2	Jonas Vingegaard (DEN)	Team Jumbo–Visma	+ 1"
3	Juan Ayuso (ESP)	UAE Team Emirates	+ 1"
4	Primož Roglič (SLO)	Team Jumbo–Visma	+ 1"
5	Marc Soler (ESP)	UAE Team Emirates	+ 1"
6	Enric Mas (ESP)	Movistar Team	+ 1"
7	Lenny Martinez (FRA)	Groupama–FDJ	+ 1"
8	Cian Uijtdebroeks (BEL)	Bora–Hansgrohe	+ 1"
9	João Almeida (POR)	UAE Team Emirates	+ 1"
10	Aleksandr Vlasov	Bora–Hansgrohe	+ 1"

General classification after stage 3
Rank	Rider	Team	Time
1	Remco Evenepoel (BEL)	Soudal–Quick-Step	8h 43' 11"
2	Enric Mas (ESP)	Movistar Team	+ 5"
3	Lenny Martinez (FRA)	Groupama–FDJ	+ 11"
4	Jonas Vingegaard (DEN)	Team Jumbo–Visma	+ 31"
5	Aleksandr Vlasov	Bora–Hansgrohe	+ 33"
6	Cian Uijtdebroeks (BEL)	Bora–Hansgrohe	+ 33"
7	Romain Bardet (FRA)	Team DSM–Firmenich	+ 35"
8	Santiago Buitrago (COL)	Team Bahrain Victorious	+ 35"
9	Wilco Kelderman (NED)	Team Jumbo–Visma	+ 37"
10	Primož Roglič (SLO)	Team Jumbo–Visma	+ 37"

== Stage 4 ==
29 August 2023 – Andorra la Vella (Andorra) to Tarragona, 185 km (115 mi)

Stage 4 of the 2023 Vuelta a España was a flat to rolling stage of 185 km from Andorra la Vella to Tarragona, with two minor climbs in the second half of the stage. It was expected to be a day for the sprinters after the mountainous stage 3.

The stage started at 13:20 CEST, with a breakaway forming early on. The peloton, led by Soudal-QuickStep, Movistar, and Alpecin-Deceuninck, nonetheless gradually increased the pace and reduced the gap. The breakaway riders started to attack each other on the first climb of the day, the Alto de Belltall (9.3 kilometres at 3.7%), which was crested by Eduardo Sepúlveda, who opened a lead in the mountains classification over Remco Evenepoel. Sepúlveda took more points for the polka dot jersey on the second climb of the day, the Coll de Lilla (5.2 kilometres at 4.9%).

The final 30 kilometres of the stage were slightly downhill, with some technical sections and roundabouts. The breakaway tried to resist, but they were caught shortly after the final intermediate sprint. The sprint teams then started to position their fast men for the finale, with Alpecin-Deceuninck, Lotto Soudal, and EF Education–EasyPost among the most prominent. The last 5 kilometres into Tarragona were chaotic, with several crashes and splits in the peloton. The final kilometre was a technical run to the line, with a slight uphill gradient. Alpecin-Deceuninck led out the sprint for their Australian rider Kaden Groves, who powered past Sebastian Molano in the last meters to win the stage.

Remco Evenepoel finished safely in the main group and retained his red jersey as the leader of the general classification. He also kept his white jersey as the leader of the young riders classification.

Stage 4 result
Rank	Rider	Team	Time
1	Kaden Groves (AUS)	Alpecin–Deceuninck	4h 05' 41"
2	Juan Sebastian Molano (COL)	UAE Team Emirates	+ 0"
3	Edward Theuns (BEL)	Lidl–Trek	+ 0"
4	Milan Menten (BEL)	Lotto–Dstny	+ 0"
5	Dries Van Gestel (BEL)	Team TotalEnergies	+ 0"
6	Orluis Aular (VEN)	Caja Rural–Seguros RGA	+ 0"
7	Hugo Page (FRA)	Intermarché–Circus–Wanty	+ 0"
8	Lewis Askey (GBR)	Groupama–FDJ	+ 0"
9	Sean Flynn (GBR)	Team DSM–Firmenich	+ 0"
10	Andrea Vendrame (ITA)	AG2R Citroën Team	+ 0"

General classification after stage 4
Rank	Rider	Team	Time
1	Remco Evenepoel (BEL)	Soudal–Quick-Step	12h 48' 58"
2	Enric Mas (ESP)	Movistar Team	+ 5"
3	Lenny Martinez (FRA)	Groupama–FDJ	+ 11"
4	Jonas Vingegaard (DEN)	Team Jumbo–Visma	+ 31"
5	Aleksandr Vlasov	Bora–Hansgrohe	+ 33"
6	Cian Uijtdebroeks (BEL)	Bora–Hansgrohe	+ 33"
7	Romain Bardet (FRA)	Team DSM–Firmenich	+ 35"
8	Primož Roglič (SLO)	Team Jumbo–Visma	+ 37"
9	Juan Ayuso (ESP)	UAE Team Emirates	+ 38"
10	Marc Soler (ESP)	UAE Team Emirates	+ 42"

== Stage 5 ==
30 August 2023 – Morella to Burriana, 186.5 km (115.9 mi)

Stage 5 was similar to stage 4 with a long, undulating stage profile (albeit with only one classified climb instead of two) and a technical sprint finish. Sepúlveda reached the summit of the classified climb first, extending his margin in the mountains classification ahead of the mountainous stage 6.

Some riders fell in the final 5 kilometres as the peloton picked up speed, with Romain Bardet falling victim to crash-related time loss. Kaden Groves won the final sprint to extend his lead in the points classification, beating Filippo Ganna by a tire width. Dries Van Gestel was third.

The general classification contenders took a back seat to the sprinters, mostly saving their legs for stage 6. Race leader Remco Evenepoel provided the only action in the GC standings, taking the intermediate bonus sprint to extend his overall advantage by six seconds.

Stage 5 result
Rank	Rider	Team	Time
1	Kaden Groves (AUS)	Alpecin–Deceuninck	4h 23' 43"
2	Filippo Ganna (ITA)	Ineos Grenadiers	+ 0"
3	Dries Van Gestel (BEL)	Team TotalEnergies	+ 0"
4	Alberto Dainese (ITA)	Team DSM–Firmenich	+ 0"
5	Lewis Askey (GBR)	Groupama–FDJ	+ 0"
6	Edward Theuns (BEL)	Lidl–Trek	+ 0"
7	David González (ESP)	Caja Rural–Seguros RGA	+ 0"
8	Geoffrey Soupe (FRA)	Team TotalEnergies	+ 0"
9	Jesús Ezquerra (ESP)	Burgos BH	+ 0"
10	Jarrad Drizners (AUS)	Lotto–Dstny	+ 0"

General classification after stage 5
Rank	Rider	Team	Time
1	Remco Evenepoel (BEL)	Soudal–Quick-Step	17h 12' 29"
2	Enric Mas (ESP)	Movistar Team	+ 11"
3	Lenny Martinez (FRA)	Groupama–FDJ	+ 17"
4	Jonas Vingegaard (DEN)	Team Jumbo–Visma	+ 37"
5	Aleksandr Vlasov	Bora–Hansgrohe	+ 39"
6	Cian Uijtdebroeks (BEL)	Bora–Hansgrohe	+ 39"
7	Primož Roglič (SLO)	Team Jumbo–Visma	+ 43"
8	Juan Ayuso (ESP)	UAE Team Emirates	+ 44"
9	Marc Soler (ESP)	UAE Team Emirates	+ 48"
10	João Almeida (POR)	UAE Team Emirates	+ 48"

== Stage 6 ==
31 August 2023 – La Vall d'Uixó to Observatorio Astrofísico de Javalambre, 183.5 km (114.0 mi)

Stage 6 was a gruelling test for the riders with the second summit finish of the race in The Observatorio Astrofísico de Javalambre (12 kilometres at 7.6% with sections up to 15%). An initial breakaway of around 40 riders was finally established after a series of attacks in the first hour of the race, building a lead of over six minutes on the peloton. Among them were Sepp Kuss, Lenny Martinez, and Romain Bardet. The breakaway held, and they reached the foot of the final climb with a lead of almost 4 minutes on the peloton.

The gap remained stable in the first half of the climb, but attacks soon began, with Einer Rubio attacking the lead group with 4.1 kilometres left of the climb. Bardet, Martinez and Kuss followed. Primož Roglič struck at a similar point from the GC group. Remco Evenepoel was distanced in the red jersey, with Enric Mas, Juan Ayuso and Cian Uijtdebroeks trying to limit their losses with Jonas Vingegaard following Roglič up the road.

Kuss then took the lead while Attila Valter dropped back for Roglič and Vingegaard, with Mas close behind. The duo then dropped Mas as Kuss put more distance into Martinez, who nonetheless was able to take the red jersey. Evenepoel limited his time loss, finishing around 30 seconds behind the Jumbo–Visma duo. Kuss won the stage and catapulted himself into second place in the general classification, ending the stage with an overall time that was nearly three minutes ahead of his leaders.

Stage 6 result
Rank	Rider	Team	Time
1	Sepp Kuss (USA)	Team Jumbo–Visma	4h 27' 29"
2	Lenny Martinez (FRA)	Groupama–FDJ	+ 26"
3	Romain Bardet (FRA)	Team DSM–Firmenich	+ 31"
4	Mikel Landa (ESP)	Team Bahrain Victorious	+ 46"
5	Marc Soler (ESP)	UAE Team Emirates	+ 46"
6	Wout Poels (NED)	Team Bahrain Victorious	+ 1' 03"
7	Einer Rubio (COL)	Movistar Team	+ 1' 05"
8	Cristian Rodriguez (ESP)	Arkéa–Samsic	+ 1' 12"
9	Steff Cras (BEL)	Team TotalEnergies	+ 1' 12"
10	Jefferson Cepeda (ECU)	Caja Rural–Seguros RGA	+ 1' 26"

General classification after stage 6
Rank	Rider	Team	Time
1	Lenny Martinez (FRA)	Groupama–FDJ	21h 40' 35"
2	Sepp Kuss (USA)	Team Jumbo–Visma	+ 8"
3	Marc Soler (ESP)	UAE Team Emirates	+ 51"
4	Wout Poels (NED)	Team Bahrain Victorious	+ 1' 41"
5	Steff Cras (BEL)	Team TotalEnergies	+ 1' 48"
6	Mikel Landa (ESP)	Team Bahrain Victorious	+ 1' 58"
7	Jefferson Cepeda (ECU)	Caja Rural–Seguros RGA	+ 2' 06"
8	David de la Cruz (ESP)	Astana Qazaqstan Team	+ 2' 23"
9	Remco Evenepoel (BEL)	Soudal–Quick-Step	+ 2' 47"
10	Enric Mas (ESP)	Movistar Team	+ 2' 50"

== Stage 7 ==
1 September 2023 – Utiel to Oliva, 201 km (125 mi)

Stage 7 result
Rank	Rider	Team	Time
1	Geoffrey Soupe (FRA)	Team TotalEnergies	4h 56' 29"
2	Orluis Aular (VEN)	Caja Rural–Seguros RGA	+ 0"
3	Edward Theuns (BEL)	Lidl–Trek	+ 0"
4	Juan Sebastián Molano (COL)	UAE Team Emirates	+ 0"
5	Kaden Groves (AUS)	Alpecin–Deceuninck	+ 0"
6	Marijn van den Berg (NED)	EF Education–EasyPost	+ 0"
7	David González (ESP)	Caja Rural–Seguros RGA	+ 0"
8	Hugo Page (FRA)	Intermarché–Circus–Wanty	+ 0"
9	Filippo Ganna (ITA)	Ineos Grenadiers	+ 0"
10	Matevž Govekar (SLO)	Team Bahrain Victorious	+ 0"

General classification after stage 7
Rank	Rider	Team	Time
1	Lenny Martinez (FRA)	Groupama–FDJ	26h 37' 04"
2	Sepp Kuss (USA)	Team Jumbo–Visma	+ 8"
3	Marc Soler (ESP)	UAE Team Emirates	+ 51"
4	Wout Poels (NED)	Team Bahrain Victorious	+ 1' 41"
5	Steff Cras (BEL)	Team TotalEnergies	+ 1' 48"
6	Mikel Landa (ESP)	Team Bahrain Victorious	+ 1' 58"
7	David de la Cruz (ESP)	Astana Qazaqstan Team	+ 2' 23"
8	Jefferson Cepeda (ECU)	Caja Rural–Seguros RGA	+ 2' 30"
9	Remco Evenepoel (BEL)	Soudal–Quick-Step	+ 2' 47"
10	Jonas Vingegaard (DEN)	Team Jumbo–Visma	+ 2' 50"

== Stage 8 ==
2 September 2023 – Dénia to Xorret de Catí, 165 km (103 mi)

Stage 8 result
Rank	Rider	Team	Time
1	Primož Roglič (SLO)	Team Jumbo–Visma	4h 13' 52"
2	Remco Evenepoel (BEL)	Soudal–Quick-Step	+ 0"
3	Juan Ayuso (ESP)	UAE Team Emirates	+ 0"
4	Enric Mas (ESP)	Movistar Team	+ 2"
5	Jonas Vingegaard (DEN)	Team Jumbo–Visma	+ 2"
6	João Almeida (POR)	UAE Team Emirates	+ 2"
7	Sepp Kuss (USA)	Team Jumbo–Visma	+ 2"
8	Marc Soler (ESP)	UAE Team Emirates	+ 2"
9	Wout Poels (NED)	Team Bahrain Victorious	+ 34"
10	Aleksandr Vlasov	Bora–Hansgrohe	+ 39"

General classification after stage 8
Rank	Rider	Team	Time
1	Sepp Kuss (USA)	Team Jumbo–Visma	30h 51' 06"
2	Marc Soler (ESP)	UAE Team Emirates	+ 43"
3	Lenny Martinez (FRA)	Groupama–FDJ	+ 1' 00"
4	Wout Poels (NED)	Team Bahrain Victorious	+ 2' 05"
5	Mikel Landa (ESP)	Team Bahrain Victorious	+ 2' 29"
6	Remco Evenepoel (BEL)	Soudal–Quick-Step	+ 2' 31"
7	Primož Roglič (SLO)	Team Jumbo–Visma	+ 2' 38"
8	Jonas Vingegaard (DEN)	Team Jumbo–Visma	+ 2' 42"
9	Enric Mas (ESP)	Movistar Team	+ 2' 42"
10	Juan Ayuso (ESP)	UAE Team Emirates	+ 2' 52"

== Stage 9 ==
3 September 2023 – Cartagena to Collado de la Cruz de Caravaca, 184.5 km (114.6 mi)

Due to poor weather conditions, the general classification timing for the stage was taken 2.050 metres from the finish.

Stage 9 result
Rank	Rider	Team	Time
1	Lennard Kämna (GER)	Bora–Hansgrohe	4h 28' 59"
2	Matteo Sobrero (ITA)	Team Jayco–AlUla	+ 13"
3	Chris Hamilton (AUS)	Team DSM–Firmenich	+ 1' 12"
4	Amanuel Ghebreigzabhier (ERI)	Lidl–Trek	+ 1' 00"
5	Jon Barrenetxea (ESP)	Caja Rural–Seguros RGA	+ 1' 37"
6	Rubén Fernández (ESP)	Cofidis	+ 1' 37"
7	Jonathan Caicedo (ECU)	EF Education–EasyPost	+ 2' 11"
8	Daniel Navarro (ESP)	Burgos BH	+ 2' 41"
9	Enric Mas (ESP)	Movistar Team	+ 3' 16"
10	Aleksandr Vlasov	Bora–Hansgrohe	+ 3' 11"

General classification after stage 9
Rank	Rider	Team	Time
1	Sepp Kuss (USA)	Team Jumbo–Visma	35h 23' 30"
2	Marc Soler (ESP)	UAE Team Emirates	+ 43"
3	Lenny Martinez (FRA)	Groupama–FDJ	+ 1' 02"
4	Remco Evenepoel (BEL)	Soudal–Quick-Step	+ 2' 22"
5	Mikel Landa (ESP)	Team Bahrain Victorious	+ 2' 29"
6	Primož Roglič (SLO)	Team Jumbo–Visma	+ 2' 29"
7	Jonas Vingegaard (DEN)	Team Jumbo–Visma	+ 2' 33"
8	Enric Mas (ESP)	Movistar Team	+ 2' 33"
9	Juan Ayuso (ESP)	UAE Team Emirates	+ 2' 43"
10	João Almeida (POR)	UAE Team Emirates	+ 2' 55"

== Rest day 1 ==
4 September 2023 – Valladolid

== Stage 10 ==
5 September 2023 – Valladolid to Valladolid, 25.8 km (16.0 mi) (ITT)

Stage 10 result
Rank	Rider	Team	Time
1	Filippo Ganna (ITA)	Ineos Grenadiers	27' 39"
2	Remco Evenepoel (BEL)	Soudal–Quick-Step	+ 16"
3	Primož Roglič (SLO)	Team Jumbo–Visma	+ 36"
4	João Almeida (POR)	UAE Team Emirates	+ 50"
5	Aleksandr Vlasov	Bora–Hansgrohe	+ 52"
6	Mattia Cattaneo (ITA)	Soudal–Quick-Step	+ 1' 09"
7	Juan Ayuso (ESP)	UAE Team Emirates	+ 1' 11"
8	Marc Soler (ESP)	UAE Team Emirates	+ 1' 12"
9	Nelson Oliveira (POR)	Movistar Team	+ 1' 12"
10	Jonas Vingegaard (DEN)	Team Jumbo–Visma	+ 1' 18"

General classification after stage 10
Rank	Rider	Team	Time
1	Sepp Kuss (USA)	Team Jumbo–Visma	35h 52' 38"
2	Marc Soler (ESP)	UAE Team Emirates	+ 26"
3	Remco Evenepoel (BEL)	Soudal–Quick-Step	+ 1' 09"
4	Primož Roglič (SLO)	Team Jumbo–Visma	+ 1' 36"
5	Lenny Martinez (FRA)	Groupama–FDJ	+ 2' 02"
6	João Almeida (POR)	UAE Team Emirates	+ 2' 16"
7	Jonas Vingegaard (DEN)	Team Jumbo–Visma	+ 2' 22"
8	Juan Ayuso (ESP)	UAE Team Emirates	+ 2' 25"
9	Enric Mas (ESP)	Movistar Team	+ 2' 50"
10	Aleksandr Vlasov	Bora–Hansgrohe	+ 3' 14"

== Stage 11 ==
6 September 2023 – Lerma to La Laguna Negra, 163.5 km (101.6 mi)

Stage 11 result
Rank	Rider	Team	Time
1	Jesús Herrada (ESP)	Cofidis	3h 29' 17"
2	Romain Grégoire (FRA)	Groupama–FDJ	+ 3"
3	Andreas Kron (DEN)	Lotto–Dstny	+ 8"
4	Jonathan Caicedo (ECU)	EF Education–EasyPost	+ 12"
5	Geraint Thomas (GBR)	Ineos Grenadiers	+ 19"
6	Pelayo Sánchez (ESP)	Burgos BH	+ 24"
7	Rudy Molard (FRA)	Groupama–FDJ	+ 24"
8	Nicolas Prodhomme (FRA)	AG2R Citroën Team	+ 27"
9	Dorian Godon (FRA)	AG2R Citroën Team	+ 58"
10	Filippo Ganna (ITA)	Ineos Grenadiers	+ 1' 16"

General classification after stage 11
Rank	Rider	Team	Time
1	Sepp Kuss (USA)	Team Jumbo–Visma	39h 27' 45"
2	Marc Soler (ESP)	UAE Team Emirates	+ 26"
3	Remco Evenepoel (BEL)	Soudal–Quick-Step	+ 1' 09"
4	Primož Roglič (SLO)	Team Jumbo–Visma	+ 1' 36"
5	Lenny Martinez (FRA)	Groupama–FDJ	+ 2' 02"
6	João Almeida (POR)	UAE Team Emirates	+ 2' 16"
7	Jonas Vingegaard (DEN)	Team Jumbo–Visma	+ 2' 22"
8	Juan Ayuso (ESP)	UAE Team Emirates	+ 2' 25"
9	Enric Mas (ESP)	Movistar Team	+ 2' 50"
10	Aleksandr Vlasov	Bora–Hansgrohe	+ 3' 14"
