= 2023 Vuelta a España =

Spanish cycling race

2023 UCI World Tour
- Route of the 2023 Vuelta a España

Race details
- Dates: 26 August – 17 September
- Stages: 21
- Distance: 3,153.8 km (1,959.7 mi)
- Winning time: 76h 48' 21"

Results
Jersey awarded to the overall winner	Winner	Sepp Kuss (USA)	(Team Jumbo–Visma)
	Second	Jonas Vingegaard (DEN)	(Team Jumbo–Visma)
	Third	Primož Roglič (SLO)	(Team Jumbo–Visma)
Jersey awarded to the points classification winner	Points	Kaden Groves (AUS)	(Alpecin–Deceuninck)
Jersey awarded to the mountains classification winner	Mountains	Remco Evenepoel (BEL)	(Soudal–Quick-Step)
Jersey awarded to the young rider classification winner	Young rider	Juan Ayuso (ESP)	(UAE Team Emirates)
Jersey awarded to the combativity classification winner	Combativity	Remco Evenepoel (BEL)	(Soudal–Quick-Step)
Jersey awarded to the team classification winner	Team	(Netherlands) Team Jumbo–Visma	

The 2023 Vuelta a España was a three-week men's cycling race taking place in Spain between 26 August and 17 September 2023. It was the 78th edition of the Vuelta a España and was won by Sepp Kuss. The race started in Barcelona, and it also went through parts of Andorra and France.

== Teams ==
22 teams were scheduled to take part in the race. All 18 UCI WorldTeams were automatically invited. They were joined by 4 UCI ProTeams - the two highest placed UCI ProTeams in 2022 (Lotto–Dstny and Team TotalEnergies), along with Burgos BH and Caja Rural–Seguros RGA who were selected by the organisers. The teams were announced on 8 March 2023.

UCI WorldTeams

- AG2R Citroën Team
- Alpecin–Deceuninck
- Arkéa–Samsic
- Astana Qazaqstan Team
- Bora–Hansgrohe
- Cofidis
- EF Education–EasyPost
- Groupama–FDJ
- INEOS Grenadiers
- Intermarché–Circus–Wanty
- Lidl–Trek
- Movistar Team
- Soudal–Quick-Step
- Team Bahrain Victorious
- Team dsm–firmenich
- Team Jayco–AlUla
- Team Jumbo–Visma
- UAE Team Emirates

UCI ProTeams

- Burgos BH
- Caja Rural–Seguros RGA
- Lotto–Dstny
- Team TotalEnergies

== Route and stages ==
Stage characteristics and winners
Stage	Date	Course	Distance	Type	Winner	Ref
1	26 August	Barcelona to Barcelona	14.8 km (9.2 mi)	Team time trial	(Netherlands) Team dsm–firmenich	
2	27 August	Mataró to Barcelona	182 km (113 mi)	Hilly stage	Andreas Kron (DEN)	
3	28 August	Súria to Arinsal (Andorra)	158.5 km (98.5 mi)	Mountain stage	Remco Evenepoel (BEL)	
4	29 August	Andorra la Vella (Andorra) to Tarragona	185 km (115 mi)	Hilly stage	Kaden Groves (AUS)	
5	30 August	Morella to Burriana	186.5 km (115.9 mi)	Hilly stage	Kaden Groves (AUS)	
6	31 August	La Vall d'Uixó to Observatorio Astrofísico de Javalambre	183.5 km (114.0 mi)	Mountain stage	Sepp Kuss (USA)	
7	1 September	Utiel to Oliva	201 km (125 mi)	Flat stage	Geoffrey Soupe (FRA)	
8	2 September	Dénia to Xorret de Catí	165 km (103 mi)	Mountain stage	Primož Roglič (SLO)	
9	3 September	Cartagena to Collado de la Cruz de Caravaca	184.5 km (114.6 mi)	Medium-mountain stage	Lennard Kämna (GER)	
	4 September	Rest day				
10	5 September	Valladolid to Valladolid	25.8 km (16.0 mi)	Individual time trial	Filippo Ganna (ITA)	
11	6 September	Lerma to La Laguna Negra	165 km (103 mi)	Hilly stage	Jesús Herrada (ESP)	
12	7 September	Ólvega to Zaragoza	151 km (94 mi)	Flat stage	Juan Sebastián Molano (COL)	
13	8 September	Formigal to Col du Tourmalet (France)	135 km (84 mi)	Mountain stage	Jonas Vingegaard (DEN)	
14	9 September	Sauveterre-de-Béarn (France) to Larra-Belagua	156.5 km (97.2 mi)	Mountain stage	Remco Evenepoel (BEL)	
15	10 September	Pamplona to Lekunberri	158.5 km (98.5 mi)	Hilly stage	Rui Costa (POR)	
	11 September	Rest day				
16	12 September	Liencres Playa to Bejes	120.5 km (74.9 mi)	Hilly stage	Jonas Vingegaard (DEN)	
17	13 September	Ribadesella to Alto de L'Angliru	124.5 km (77.4 mi)	Mountain stage	Primož Roglič (SLO)	
18	14 September	Pola de Allande to La Cruz de Linares	179 km (111 mi)	Mountain stage	Remco Evenepoel (BEL)	
19	15 September	La Bañeza to Íscar	177.5 km (110.3 mi)	Flat stage	Alberto Dainese (ITA)	
20	16 September	Manzanares el Real to Guadarrama	208 km (129 mi)	Hilly stage	Wout Poels (NED)	
21	17 September	Hipódromo de la Zarzuela to Madrid	101.5 km (63.1 mi)	Flat stage	Kaden Groves (AUS)	
Total			3,153.8 km (1,959.7 mi)			

== Pre-race favourites ==
The main pre-race favourites to win the general classification were 2023 Tour de France winner Jonas Vingegaard, 2022 Vuelta a España winner Remco Evenepoel, as well as 2023 Giro d'Italia winner Primož Roglič. Juan Ayuso, Geraint Thomas, and Enric Mas were also mentioned as competitors for a podium finish. Outside contenders included Mikel Landa, Eddie Dunbar and Aleksandr Vlasov.

The pre-race favourites for the sprinters to win the points classification were Kaden Groves and Bryan Coquard.

== Classification leadership ==
Classification leadership by stage
Stage	Winner	General classification	Points classification	Mountains classification	Young rider classification	Team classification	Combativity award
1	Team dsm–firmenich	Lorenzo Milesi	not awarded	not awarded	Lorenzo Milesi	Team dsm–firmenich	not awarded
2	Andreas Kron	Andrea Piccolo	Andreas Kron	Matteo Sobrero	Andrea Piccolo	EF Education–EasyPost	Javier Romo
3	Remco Evenepoel	Remco Evenepoel	Andrea Vendrame	Remco Evenepoel	Remco Evenepoel	Team Jumbo–Visma	Damiano Caruso
4	Kaden Groves	Remco Evenepoel	Kaden Groves	Eduardo Sepúlveda	Remco Evenepoel	Team Jumbo–Visma	Ander Okamika
5	Kaden Groves	Remco Evenepoel	Kaden Groves	Eduardo Sepúlveda	Remco Evenepoel	Team Jumbo–Visma	Eric Fagúndez
6	Sepp Kuss	Lenny Martinez	Kaden Groves	Eduardo Sepúlveda	Lenny Martinez	Team Bahrain Victorious	Mikel Landa
7	Geoffrey Soupe	Lenny Martinez	Kaden Groves	Eduardo Sepúlveda	Lenny Martinez	Team Bahrain Victorious	Ander Okamika
8	Primož Roglič	Sepp Kuss	Kaden Groves	Eduardo Sepúlveda	Lenny Martinez	Team Jumbo–Visma	Oier Lazkano
9	Lennard Kämna	Sepp Kuss	Kaden Groves	Eduardo Sepúlveda	Lenny Martinez	Team Jumbo–Visma	Jon Barrenetxea
10	Filippo Ganna	Sepp Kuss	Kaden Groves	Eduardo Sepúlveda	Remco Evenepoel	Team Jumbo–Visma	not awarded
11	Jesús Herrada	Sepp Kuss	Kaden Groves	Jesús Herrada	Remco Evenepoel	Team Jumbo–Visma	José Manuel Díaz
12	Juan Sebastián Molano	Sepp Kuss	Kaden Groves	Jesús Herrada	Remco Evenepoel	Team Jumbo–Visma	Jetse Bol
13	Jonas Vingegaard	Sepp Kuss	Kaden Groves	Jonas Vingegaard	Juan Ayuso	Team Jumbo–Visma	Michael Storer
14	Remco Evenepoel	Sepp Kuss	Kaden Groves	Remco Evenepoel	Juan Ayuso	Team Jumbo–Visma	Remco Evenepoel
15	Rui Costa	Sepp Kuss	Kaden Groves	Remco Evenepoel	Juan Ayuso	Team Jumbo–Visma	Remco Evenepoel
16	Jonas Vingegaard	Sepp Kuss	Kaden Groves	Remco Evenepoel	Juan Ayuso	Team Jumbo–Visma	Joel Nicolau
17	Primož Roglič	Sepp Kuss	Kaden Groves	Remco Evenepoel	Juan Ayuso	Team Jumbo–Visma	Remco Evenepoel
18	Remco Evenepoel	Sepp Kuss	Kaden Groves	Remco Evenepoel	Juan Ayuso	Team Jumbo–Visma	Remco Evenepoel
19	Alberto Dainese	Sepp Kuss	Kaden Groves	Remco Evenepoel	Juan Ayuso	Team Jumbo–Visma	Michal Schlegel
20	Wout Poels	Sepp Kuss	Kaden Groves	Remco Evenepoel	Juan Ayuso	Team Jumbo–Visma	Pelayo Sánchez
21	Kaden Groves	Sepp Kuss	Kaden Groves	Remco Evenepoel	Juan Ayuso	Team Jumbo–Visma	not awarded
Final		Sepp Kuss	Kaden Groves	Remco Evenepoel	Juan Ayuso	Team Jumbo–Visma	Remco Evenepoel

- On stage 2, the distinctive jerseys were worn by members of Team DSM-Firmenich. The green jersey was worn by Romain Bardet, the polka dot jersey was worn by Sean Flynn, and the white jersey was worn by Max Poole, on behalf of Lorenzo Milesi.
- On stage 3, the white jersey was worn by Javier Romo, on behalf of Andrea Piccolo.
- On stage 4, the white jersey was worn by Lenny Martinez and the polka dot jersey was worn by Eduardo Sepúlveda, both on behalf of Remco Evenepoel.
- On stage 5, the white jersey was worn by Lenny Martinez, on behalf of Remco Evenepoel.
- On stage 6 and stage 7, the white jersey was worn by Juan Ayuso, on behalf of Lenny Martinez.

== Classification standings ==
Legend
Denotes the winner of the general classification	Denotes the winner of the young rider classification
Denotes the winner of the points classification	Denotes the winner of the team classification
Denotes the winner of the mountains classification	Denotes the winner of the combativity award

=== General classification ===
Final general classification (1–10)
Rank	Rider	Team	Time
1	Sepp Kuss (USA)	Team Jumbo–Visma	76h 48' 21"
2	Jonas Vingegaard (DEN)	Team Jumbo–Visma	+ 17"
3	Primož Roglič (SLO)	Team Jumbo–Visma	+ 1' 08"
4	Juan Ayuso (ESP)	UAE Team Emirates	+ 3' 18"
5	Mikel Landa (ESP)	Team Bahrain Victorious	+ 3' 37"
6	Enric Mas (ESP)	Movistar Team	+ 4' 14"
7	Aleksandr Vlasov	Bora–Hansgrohe	+ 7' 53"
8	Cian Uijtdebroeks (BEL)	Bora–Hansgrohe	+ 8' 00"
9	João Almeida (POR)	UAE Team Emirates	+ 10' 08"
10	Santiago Buitrago (COL)	Team Bahrain Victorious	+ 11' 38"

Final general classification (11–148)
Rank	Rider	Team	Time
11	Steff Cras (BEL)	Team TotalEnergies	+ 14' 04"
12	Remco Evenepoel (BEL)	Soudal–Quick-Step	+ 16' 44"
13	Cristián Rodríguez (ESP)	Arkéa–Samsic	+ 22' 13"
14	Marc Soler (ESP)	UAE Team Emirates	+ 25' 21"
15	Wout Poels (NED)	Team Bahrain Victorious	+ 31' 00"
16	Einer Rubio (COL)	Movistar Team	+ 34' 49"
17	Juan Pedro López (ESP)	Lidl–Trek	+ 35' 47"
18	Antonio Tiberi (ITA)	Team Bahrain Victorious	+ 50' 13"
19	Damiano Caruso (ITA)	Team Bahrain Victorious	+ 53' 47"
20	Emanuel Buchmann (GER)	Bora–Hansgrohe	+ 59' 02"
21	Romain Bardet (FRA)	Team dsm–firmenich	+ 1h 02' 10"
22	Attila Valter (HUN)	Team Jumbo–Visma	+ 1h 05' 42"
23	Hugh Carthy (GBR)	EF Education–EasyPost	+ 1h 19' 25"
24	Lenny Martinez (FRA)	Groupama–FDJ	+ 1h 21' 41"
25	Wilco Kelderman (NED)	Team Jumbo–Visma	+ 1h 24' 38"
26	Paul Ourselin (FRA)	Team TotalEnergies	+ 1h 28' 13"
27	Nicolas Prodhomme (FRA)	AG2R Citroën Team	+ 1h 29' 05"
28	Rémy Rochas (FRA)	Cofidis	+ 1h 29' 27"
29	Rudy Molard (FRA)	Groupama–FDJ	+ 1h 33' 14"
30	Lennard Kämna (GER)	Bora–Hansgrohe	+ 1h 38' 06"
31	Geraint Thomas (GBR)	INEOS Grenadiers	+ 1h 47' 59"
32	Lennert Van Eetvelt (BEL)	Lotto–Dstny	+ 1h 48' 52"
33	Louis Vervaeke (BEL)	Soudal–Quick-Step	+ 1h 49' 44"
34	Mattia Cattaneo (ITA)	Soudal–Quick-Step	+ 1h 51' 42"
35	Ben Zwiehoff (GER)	Bora–Hansgrohe	+ 1h 52' 28"
36	Fabien Doubey (FRA)	Team TotalEnergies	+ 1h 56' 08"
37	Pelayo Sánchez (ESP)	Burgos BH	+ 1h 56' 27"
38	Jan Tratnik (SLO)	Team Jumbo–Visma	+ 1h 57' 16"
39	Daniel Navarro (ESP)	Burgos BH	+ 1h 57' 40"
40	Finn Fisher-Black (NZL)	UAE Team Emirates	+ 1h 58' 23"
41	Rui Costa (POR)	Intermarché–Circus–Wanty	+ 1h 59' 20"
42	Romain Grégoire (FRA)	Groupama–FDJ	+ 2h 01' 38"
43	Sergio Higuita (COL)	Bora–Hansgrohe	+ 2h 08' 05"
44	Larry Warbasse (USA)	AG2R Citroën Team	+ 2h 09' 29"
45	Michael Storer (AUS)	Groupama–FDJ	+ 2h 13' 42"
46	Andrey Zeits (KAZ)	Astana Qazaqstan Team	+ 2h 14' 13"
47	Jonathan Kléver Caicedo (ECU)	EF Education–EasyPost	+ 2h 15' 49"
48	Fernando Barceló (ESP)	Caja Rural–Seguros RGA	+ 2h 17' 00"
49	Max Poole (GBR)	Team dsm–firmenich	+ 2h 17' 18"
50	Kenny Elissonde (FRA)	Lidl–Trek	+ 2h 18' 25"
51	Dorian Godon (FRA)	AG2R Citroën Team	+ 2h 19' 07"
52	Robert Gesink (NED)	Team Jumbo–Visma	+ 2h 19' 43"
53	Nelson Oliveira (POR)	Movistar Team	+ 2h 20' 10"
54	Rubén Fernández (ESP)	Cofidis	+ 2h 21' 26"
55	Egan Bernal (COL)	INEOS Grenadiers	+ 2h 22' 50"
56	Mikaël Cherel (FRA)	AG2R Citroën Team	+ 2h 24' 19"
57	Joe Dombrowski (USA)	Astana Qazaqstan Team	+ 2h 26' 13"
58	Simone Petilli (ITA)	Intermarché–Circus–Wanty	+ 2h 27' 46"
59	Jan Hirt (CZE)	Soudal–Quick-Step	+ 2h 29' 04"
60	Jonathan Castroviejo (ESP)	INEOS Grenadiers	+ 2h 29' 11"
61	Luis León Sánchez (ESP)	Astana Qazaqstan Team	+ 2h 36' 29"
62	Ander Okamika (ESP)	Burgos BH	+ 2h 36' 34"
63	Chris Hamilton (AUS)	Team dsm–firmenich	+ 2h 36' 47"
64	José Manuel Díaz (ESP)	Burgos BH	+ 2h 37' 04"
65	James Knox (GBR)	Soudal–Quick-Step	+ 2h 38' 31"
66	Michel Ries (LUX)	Arkéa–Samsic	+ 2h 38' 52"
67	Andreas Kron (DEN)	Lotto–Dstny	+ 2h 41' 49"
68	Julien Bernard (FRA)	Lidl–Trek	+ 2h 43' 57"
69	Andrea Piccolo (ITA)	EF Education–EasyPost	+ 2h 44' 14"
70	Felix Engelhardt (GER)	Team Jayco–AlUla	+ 2h 44' 35"
71	Jasha Sütterlin (GER)	Team Bahrain Victorious	+ 2h 46' 56"
72	Iván García (ESP)	Movistar Team	+ 2h 47' 04"
73	Élie Gesbert (FRA)	Arkéa–Samsic	+ 2h 48' 24"
74	Jon Barrenetxea (ESP)	Caja Rural–Seguros RGA	+ 2h 48' 51"
75	Łukasz Owsian (POL)	Arkéa–Samsic	+ 2h 49' 48"
76	Fabio Felline (ITA)	Astana Qazaqstan Team	+ 2h 50' 18"
77	Abel Balderstone (ESP)	Caja Rural–Seguros RGA	+ 2h 50' 22"
78	Imanol Erviti (ESP)	Movistar Team	+ 2h 51' 33"
79	Bauke Mollema (NED)	Lidl–Trek	+ 2h 51' 48"
80	Sean Quinn (USA)	EF Education–EasyPost	+ 2h 52' 02"
81	Oier Lazkano (ESP)	Movistar Team	+ 2h 56' 45"
82	Amanuel Ghebreigzabhier (ERI)	Lidl–Trek	+ 2h 57' 43"
83	Jesús Herrada (ESP)	Cofidis	+ 2h 59' 47"
84	Diego Andrés Camargo (COL)	EF Education–EasyPost	+ 3h 00' 24"
85	Lorenzo Germani (ITA)	Groupama–FDJ	+ 3h 01' 05"
86	Matteo Sobrero (ITA)	Team Jayco–AlUla	+ 3h 01' 23"
87	Jorge Arcas (ESP)	Movistar Team	+ 3h 01' 28"
88	Dylan van Baarle (NED)	Team Jumbo–Visma	+ 3h 02' 37"
89	Jesús Ezquerra (ESP)	Burgos BH	+ 3h 05' 57"
90	Mathis Le Berre (FRA)	Arkéa–Samsic	+ 3h 11' 23"
91	Vadim Pronskiy (KAZ)	Astana Qazaqstan Team	+ 3h 12' 40"
92	Jacopo Mosca (ITA)	Lidl–Trek	+ 3h 13' 12"
93	Jonas Koch (GER)	Bora–Hansgrohe	+ 3h 16' 08"
94	Sylvain Moniquet (BEL)	Lotto–Dstny	+ 3h 16' 23"
95	Andrea Vendrame (ITA)	AG2R Citroën Team	+ 3h 17' 26"
96	Pieter Serry (BEL)	Soudal–Quick-Step	+ 3h 18' 17"
97	Nico Denz (GER)	Bora–Hansgrohe	+ 3h 20' 12"
98	Julius Johansen (DEN)	Intermarché–Circus–Wanty	+ 3h 20' 38"
99	Thomas De Gendt (BEL)	Lotto–Dstny	+ 3h 22' 23"
100	Joel Nicolau (ESP)	Caja Rural–Seguros RGA	+ 3h 25' 22"
101	Geoffrey Soupe (FRA)	Team TotalEnergies	+ 3h 25' 38"
102	Eduardo Sepúlveda (ARG)	Lotto–Dstny	+ 3h 26' 22"
103	Kévin Ledanois (FRA)	Arkéa–Samsic	+ 3h 29' 13"
104	Filippo Ganna (ITA)	INEOS Grenadiers	+ 3h 29' 23"
105	Lewis Askey (GBR)	Groupama–FDJ	+ 3h 34' 07"
106	David González (ESP)	Caja Rural–Seguros RGA	+ 3h 35' 12"
107	Dries Van Gestel (BEL)	Team TotalEnergies	+ 3h 35' 34"
108	Cyril Barthe (FRA)	Burgos BH	+ 3h 37' 20"
109	Paul Lapeira (FRA)	AG2R Citroën Team	+ 3h 37' 49"
110	Jetse Bol (NED)	Burgos BH	+ 3h 38' 49"
111	Hugo Hofstetter (FRA)	Arkéa–Samsic	+ 3h 41' 43"
112	Jimmy Janssens (BEL)	Alpecin–Deceuninck	+ 3h 42' 07"
113	Otto Vergaerde (BEL)	Lidl–Trek	+ 3h 42' 47"
114	Michal Schlegel (CZE)	Caja Rural–Seguros RGA	+ 3h 43' 03"
115	Omar Fraile (ESP)	INEOS Grenadiers	+ 3h 43' 40"
116	Sean Flynn (GBR)	Team dsm–firmenich	+ 3h 46' 39"
117	Stefan Bissegger (SUI)	EF Education–EasyPost	+ 3h 49' 54"
118	Sébastien Grignard (BEL)	Lotto–Dstny	+ 3h 52' 09"
119	Romain Combaud (FRA)	Team dsm–firmenich	+ 3h 52' 10"
120	Julius van den Berg (NED)	EF Education–EasyPost	+ 3h 55' 05"
121	Samuele Battistella (ITA)	Astana Qazaqstan Team	+ 3h 55' 44"
122	Kaden Groves (AUS)	Alpecin–Deceuninck	+ 3h 55' 48"
123	Samuel Watson (GBR)	Groupama–FDJ	+ 3h 56' 03"
124	Boy van Poppel (NED)	Intermarché–Circus–Wanty	+ 3h 56' 20"
125	François Bidard (FRA)	Cofidis	+ 3h 57' 47"
126	Marijn van den Berg (NED)	EF Education–EasyPost	+ 3h 57' 58"
127	Hugo Page (FRA)	Intermarché–Circus–Wanty	+ 3h 58' 16"
128	Edward Theuns (BEL)	Lidl–Trek	+ 3h 58' 20"
129	Eric Fagúndez (URU)	Burgos BH	+ 4h 00' 37"
130	Kamil Gradek (POL)	Team Bahrain Victorious	+ 4h 00' 43"
131	Jason Osborne (GER)	Alpecin–Deceuninck	+ 4h 01' 48"
132	José Herrada (ESP)	Cofidis	+ 4h 04' 20"
133	Matevž Govekar (SLO)	Team Bahrain Victorious	+ 4h 04' 42"
134	André Carvalho (POR)	Cofidis	+ 4h 05' 13"
135	Clément Davy (FRA)	Groupama–FDJ	+ 4h 07' 49"
136	Edward Planckaert (BEL)	Alpecin–Deceuninck	+ 4h 07' 53"
137	Jan Maas (NED)	Team Jayco–AlUla	+ 4h 08' 47"
138	Domen Novak (SLO)	UAE Team Emirates	+ 4h 08' 58"
139	Kim Heiduk (GER)	INEOS Grenadiers	+ 4h 10' 09"
140	Casper Pedersen (DEN)	Soudal–Quick-Step	+ 4h 13' 57"
141	Tobias Bayer (AUT)	Alpecin–Deceuninck	+ 4h 15' 43"
142	Milan Menten (BEL)	Lotto–Dstny	+ 4h 16' 43"
143	Maurice Ballerstedt (GER)	Alpecin–Deceuninck	+ 4h 22' 11"
144	Alberto Dainese (ITA)	Team dsm–firmenich	+ 4h 25' 39"
145	Jarrad Drizners (AUS)	Lotto–Dstny	+ 4h 25' 50"
146	Davide Cimolai (ITA)	Cofidis	+ 4h 26' 25"
147	Juan Sebastián Molano (COL)	UAE Team Emirates	+ 4h 27' 41"
148	Rui Oliveira (POR)	UAE Team Emirates	+ 4h 32' 55"

=== Points classification ===
Final points classification (1–10)
Rank	Rider	Team	Points
1	Kaden Groves (AUS)	Alpecin–Deceuninck	315
2	Remco Evenepoel (BEL)	Soudal–Quick-Step	236
3	Andreas Kron (DEN)	Lotto–Dstny	167
4	Marc Soler (ESP)	UAE Team Emirates	133
5	Jonas Vingegaard (DEN)	Team Jumbo–Visma	123
6	Filippo Ganna (ITA)	INEOS Grenadiers	119
7	Primož Roglič (SLO)	Team Jumbo–Visma	117
8	Marijn van den Berg (NED)	EF Education–EasyPost	117
9	Sepp Kuss (USA)	Team Jumbo–Visma	112
10	Juan Ayuso (ESP)	UAE Team Emirates	105

=== Mountains classification ===
Final mountains classification (1–10)
Rank	Rider	Team	Points
1	Remco Evenepoel (BEL)	Soudal–Quick-Step	135
2	Jonas Vingegaard (DEN)	Team Jumbo–Visma	51
3	Michael Storer (AUS)	Groupama–FDJ	39
4	Romain Bardet (FRA)	Team dsm–firmenich	35
5	Primož Roglič (SLO)	Team Jumbo–Visma	33
6	Sepp Kuss (USA)	Team Jumbo–Visma	33
7	Damiano Caruso (ITA)	Team Bahrain Victorious	30
8	Andreas Kron (DEN)	Lotto–Dstny	28
9	Eduardo Sepúlveda (ARG)	Lotto–Dstny	23
10	Jesús Herrada (ESP)	Cofidis	22

=== Young rider classification ===
Final young rider classification (1–10)
Rank	Rider	Team	Time
1	Juan Ayuso (ESP)	UAE Team Emirates	76h 51' 39"
2	Cian Uijtdebroeks (BEL)	Bora–Hansgrohe	+ 4' 42"
3	João Almeida (POR)	UAE Team Emirates	+ 6' 40"
4	Santiago Buitrago (COL)	Team Bahrain Victorious	+ 8' 20"
5	Remco Evenepoel (BEL)	Soudal–Quick-Step	+ 13' 26"
6	Einer Rubio (COL)	Movistar Team	+ 31' 31"
7	Antonio Tiberi (ITA)	Team Bahrain Victorious	+ 46' 55"
8	Attila Valter (HUN)	Team Jumbo–Visma	+ 1h 02' 24"
9	Lenny Martinez (FRA)	Groupama–FDJ	+ 1h 18' 23"
10	Lennert Van Eetvelt (BEL)	Lotto–Dstny	+ 1h 45' 34"

=== Team classification ===
Final team classification (1–10)
Rank	Team	Time
1	(Netherlands) Team Jumbo–Visma	229h 42' 26"
2	Team Bahrain Victorious	+ 20' 49"
3	(Germany) Bora–Hansgrohe	+ 32' 54"
4	(United Arab Emirates) UAE Team Emirates	+ 33' 46"
5	(Spain) Movistar Team	+ 2h 17' 23"
6	(Belgium) Soudal–Quick-Step	+ 3h 18' 27"
7	(France) Team TotalEnergies	+ 3h 25' 09"
8	(France) Groupama–FDJ	+ 3h 42' 37"
9	(United States) Lidl–Trek	+ 4h 00' 16"
10	(France) Arkéa–Samsic	+ 4h 23' 23"

Preceded by 2023 Tour de France	Grand Tour	Succeeded by 2024 Giro d'Italia
