= Sepp Kuss =

American cyclist (born 1994)

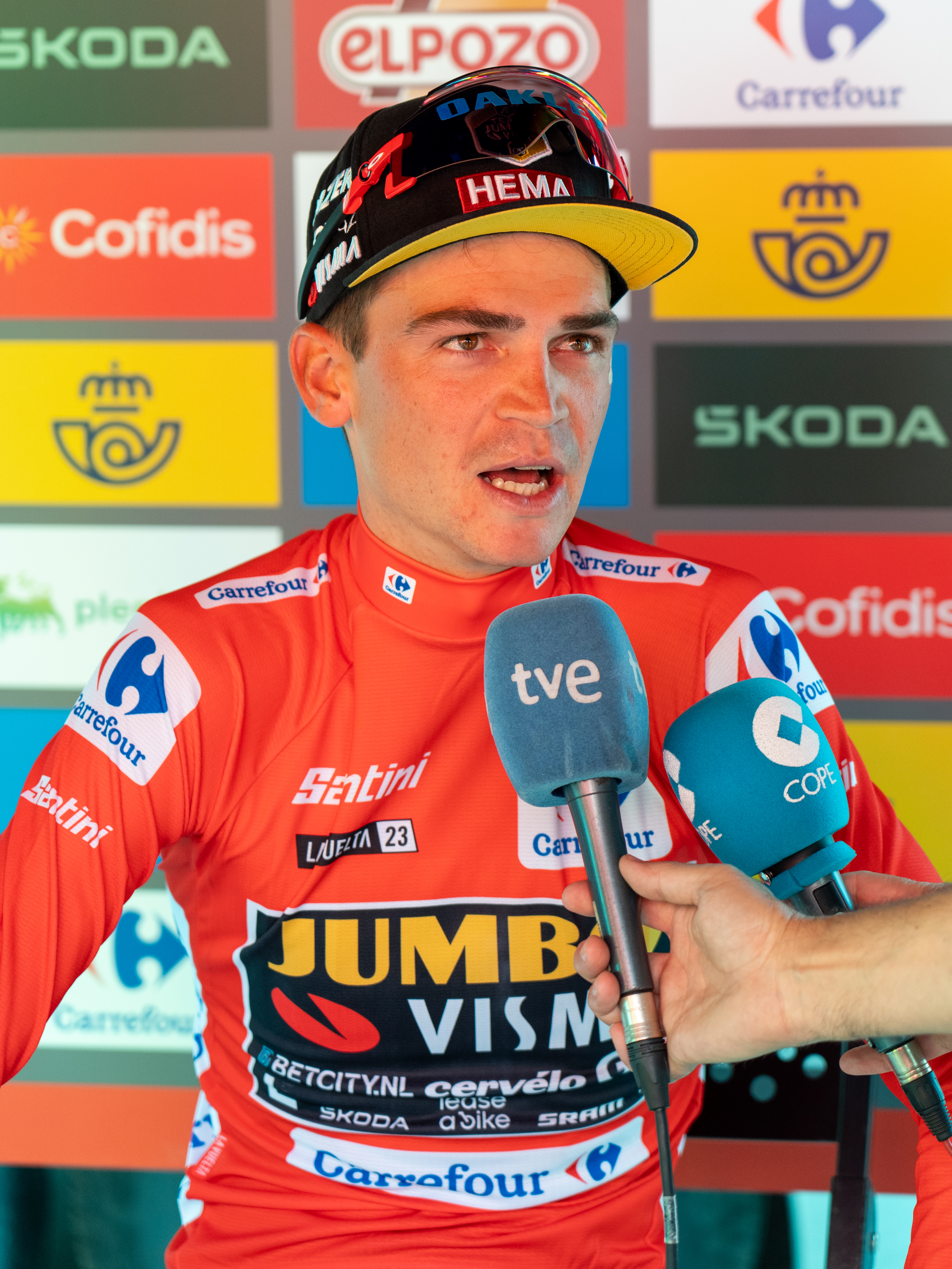
- Kuss at the 2023 Vuelta a España

Personal information
- Nicknames: The Eagle of Durango; The Mailman; The Durango Kid
- Born: September 13, 1994 (age 32) Durango, Colorado
- Height: 1.82 m (5 ft 11 1/2 in)
- Weight: 61 kg (134 lb; 9 st 8 lb)

Cycling career
- Sport: Cycling
- Current team: Visma–Lease a Bike
- Discipline: Road
- Role: Rider
- Rider type: Climber; Super-domestique

Amateur teams
- 2015: Intermountain-Livewell
- 2016: Gateway Harley Davidson / Trek

Professional teams
- 2016–2017: Rally Cycling
- 2018–: LottoNL–Jumbo

Major wins
- Grand Tours Tour de France 1 individual stage (2021) 1 TTT stage (2026) Giro d'Italia 1 individual stage (2026) Vuelta a España General classification (2023) 2 individual stages (2019, 2023) 1 TTT stage (2022) Stage races Vuelta a Burgos (2024) Tour of Utah (2018)

Sepp Kuss (born September 13, 1994) is an American professional cyclist who rides for UCI WorldTeam Visma–Lease a Bike. He won the 2023 Vuelta a España, becoming the first American to win a Grand Tour since Chris Horner in 2013. Kuss is the second cyclist to win a Grand Tour and finish all three Grand Tours in a single season, after Gastone Nencini in 1957.

Born in Durango, Colorado, Kuss started as a mountain biker and won three collegiate national championships at the University of Colorado Boulder. After transitioning to road cycling in 2016, Kuss progressed from amateur races to the WorldTour within two years, establishing himself as a climbing specialist. Media outlets have described Kuss as a "super-domestique" for his support of team leaders Primož Roglič and Jonas Vingegaard in winning a combined six Grand Tours. Kuss won individual stages at the Tour de France (2021), Giro d'Italia (2026), and Vuelta a España (2019, 2023) as well as the general classification at the 2018 Tour of Utah and 2024 Vuelta a Burgos. His 2023 Vuelta victory completed Team Jumbo-Visma's unprecedented sweep of all three Grand Tours in a single season.

== Early life and background ==
Sepp Kuss was born on September 13, 1994, in Durango, Colorado to parents Adolph and Sabina Kuss. Adolph was the coach of the United States Ski Team from 1963 to 1972, and a professor of exercise science at Fort Lewis College. A significant figure in developing the outdoor sports reputation of Durango, he was inducted into the Colorado Snowsports Hall of Fame in 1990. His mother Sabina also taught Nordic skiing.

Kuss excelled in many outdoor sports as a child, including trail running, skiing, and whitewater kayaking. His favorite sport as a child was ice hockey. In fourth grade, his parents enrolled him in Durango Devo, a youth mountain bike program that has produced other significant cyclists such as Howard Grotts, an Olympian in 2016, and Christopher Blevins, winner of the short track event at the 2021 UCI Mountain Bike World Championships. Kuss committed to cycling as his primary sport during his senior year of high school.

== Amateur career ==
=== Mountain biking ===
In 2013, Kuss enrolled at the University of Colorado Boulder, where he continued mountain biking. Kuss won three national titles at the cycling collegiate championships in XC (2014 and 2015) and Short Track (2014). Kuss also competed internationally, racing at the 2014 UCI Mountain Bike World Championships in Lillehammer, where he finished 36th in the under 23 cross country race. The next year, at the 2015 championships in Andorra, Kuss finished 48th in the same event.

During a university cycling team interview, when asked about his favorite type of racing, Kuss said "XC is my thing but I enjoy road races too," and stated that his cycling ambitions were only to "take cycling as far as I can once I finish my degree."

=== Road cycling ===
In Kuss's own words, he "slowly gravitated to road racing" over the course of college. After being introduced to road cycling through a collegiate cycling club, Kuss decided in 2015 to split his effort between road and mountain biking. On the road, he raced with an amateur team sponsored by Intermountain LiveWell. In an interview, Kuss stated he was drawn to road cycling because of "the longer, steeper climbs, those longer efforts," which he felt suited his skills better than mountain bike courses.

In 2016, Kuss joined the amateur Gateway Harley Davidson / Trek team, and decided to focus fully on road cycling. He increased his training volume and consistency, and worked to adjust to the style of modern road cycling, which he found more dynamic than the "time trial"-like efforts of mountain biking. His first win on the road came in the Redlands Bicycle Classic, where Kuss beat former UCI WorldTour riders Lachlan Morton and Janier Acevedo on the stage 2 summit finish to Oak Glen.

Kuss's surprise win drew the attention of professional teams. In May, Kuss raced at the Tour of the Gila, where he again demonstrated his climbing potential with a fourth place finish on the opening stage climb to Mogollon. Following the race, where Kuss finished 14th overall, Rally Cycling announced they were signing Kuss for the remainder of the 2016 season.

== Professional career ==
=== Rally Cycling (2016–2017) ===
In Kuss's first stage race with Rally, the Tour de Beauce in Canada, he won a mountain stage and finished 6th overall. For the remainder of the 2016 season, Kuss travelled to Europe for his first block of international road racing, including riding the Tour de l'Avenir with the US national team. In a 2020 interview, Kuss recalled "being absolutely blown away, physically and mentally, by the toughness of European racing."

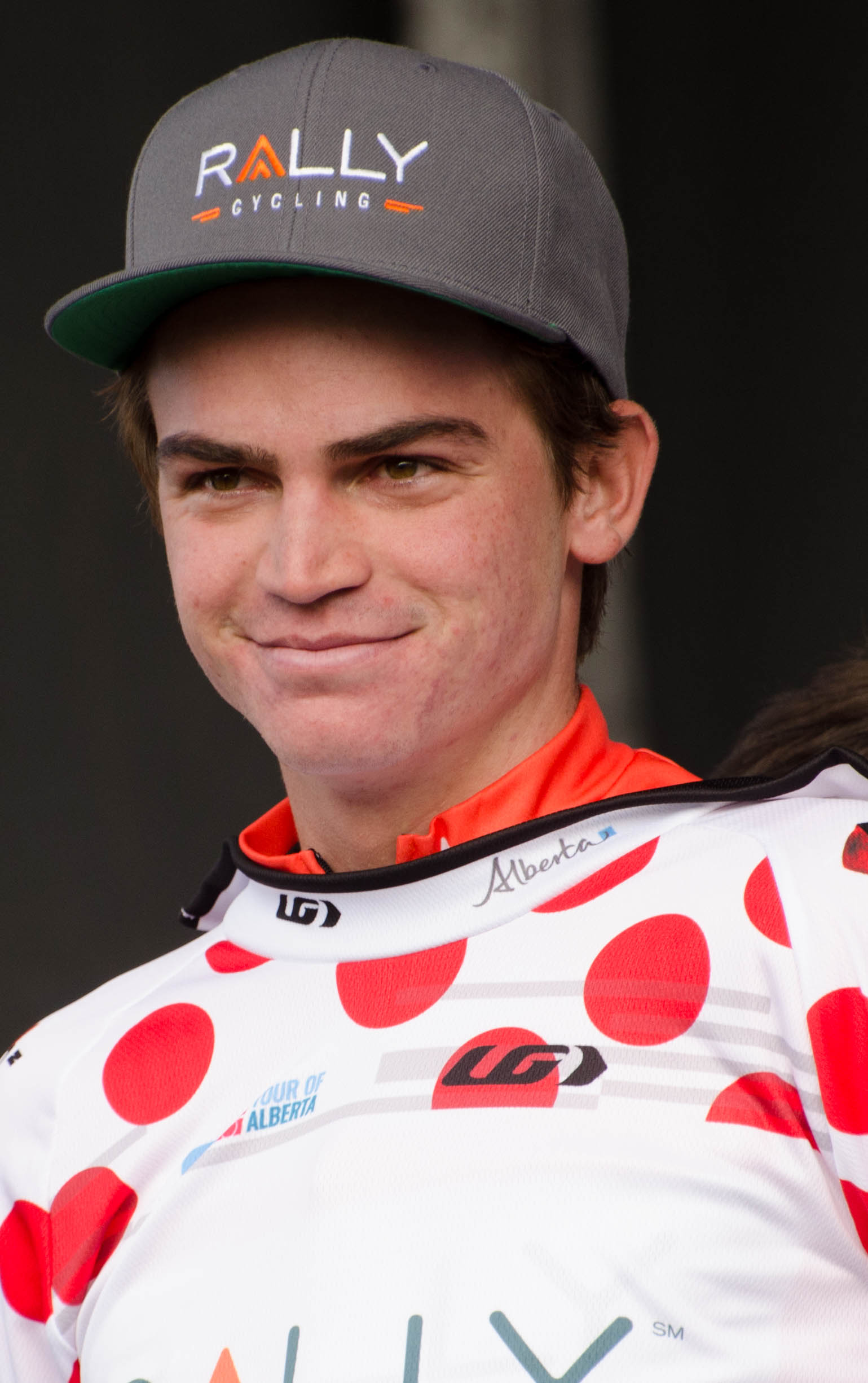
Kuss at the 2017 Tour of Alberta

At the 2017 Tour of California, Kuss finished 10th on the difficult stage 5 climb to Mount Baldy. This drew the attention of LottoNL–Jumbo director Merijn Zeeman, who reached out to Kuss for physiological testing. Kuss followed up with strong results for the rest of the 2017 season, including a second overall finish at the Tour of Alberta. Just days after his 23rd birthday, Kuss signed a two-year contract with LottoNL-Jumbo, to ride in the UCI WorldTour starting in 2018. In just two years, Kuss had transitioned from a collegiate mountain biker to the highest level of road cycling. He signed his first WorldTour contract while still a college student—he completed his degree in advertising at CU Boulder in late 2017.

=== Team Visma–Lease a Bike (2018–present) ===
==== 2018–2019: Adjustment to WorldTour ====
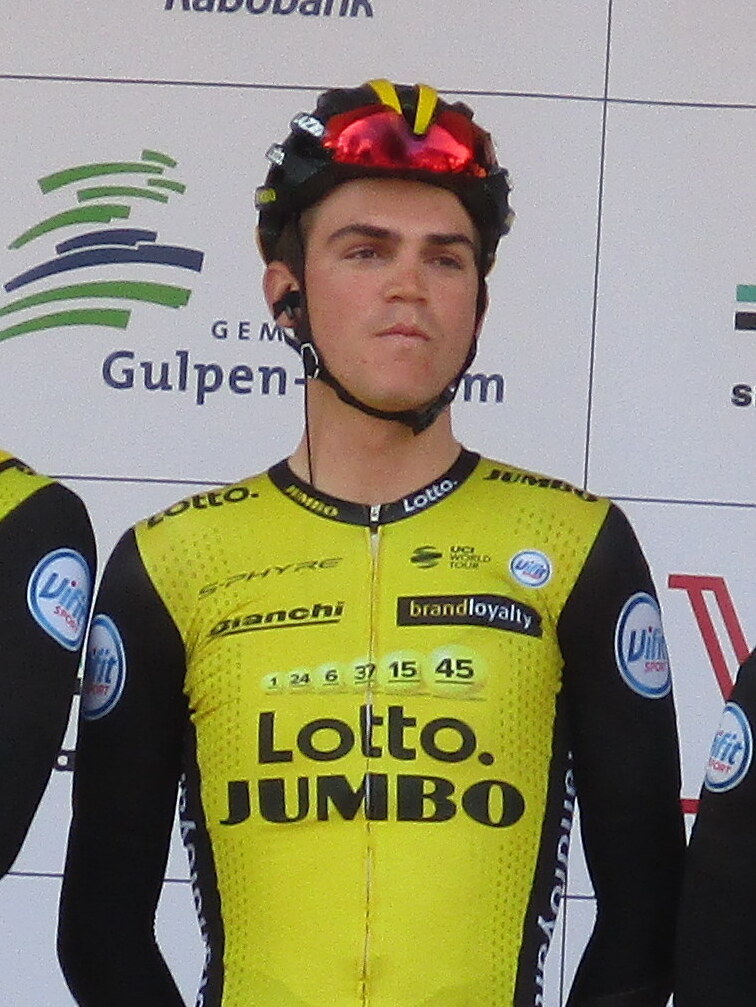
Kuss at the 2018 Volta Limburg Classic, his fifth race with LottoNL–Jumbo

Kuss struggled to start his first season with the Dutch team, getting frequent DNFs as he adjusted to WorldTour racing. In August, Kuss returned to the US for the Tour of Utah. On stage 2, Kuss attacked with 45 km to the finish, catching the day's breakaway and riding solo to win the stage and go into the overall lead. Kuss attacked again on stage 5, a difficult queen stage ending at Snowbird, winning by over 30 seconds, before cementing his victory with another solo attack to win the final stage 6. Kuss finished with 3 stage wins, the mountains jersey, and the overall victory in what The Salt Lake Tribune called "the most dominant performance in the history of this event."

Following his performance in Utah, Kuss was selected to ride in the 2018 Vuelta a España, his first Grand Tour. LottoNL–Jumbo management did not typically select neo-pros to Grand Tour teams, but they made an exception for Kuss. Kuss rode as a domestique, leading the peloton in the mountains for team leader Steven Kruijswijk, who finished the race in fourth overall.

Kuss rode in the 2019 Giro d'Italia, supporting Primož Roglič who finished the race third overall. In August, Kuss returned to the Vuelta a España. On stage 15, Kuss attacked from the breakaway on the final climb to Puerto del Acebo, riding solo for the final 6 km to claim his first Grand Tour stage win. Kuss also supported Roglič throughout the race, who would go on to win the general classification. The race established Kuss as one of Roglič's key mountain domestiques, a partnership that would continue in many future Grand Tours.

==== 2020–2022: Mountain super-domestique ====
In 2020, Kuss won stage 5 of the Critérium du Dauphiné, riding away from a group of strong climbers on the final climb in Megève. Later that month, Kuss was officially selected for his first Tour de France, as part of a Jumbo-Visma squad that cycling media called a 'super-team' led by Roglič, Tom Dumoulin, and Steven Kruijswijk.

During the Tour, Kuss established himself as a 'super-domestique', and was widely noted for his ability to assist team leader Roglič in the mountains and stay with the race leaders deep into climbs. Kuss finished the race in 15th overall, the best American debut performance at the Tour since 2013, when Andrew Talansky finished 10th. Kuss continued to support Roglič in the 2020 Vuelta a España, who won the race for the second consecutive year.

In 2021, Kuss again rode the Tour de France. On stage 15, Kuss broke away from a group of 20 riders with 5 km to go on the Col de Beixalis, the stage's final climb. Kuss maintained his lead for the 15 km that followed the summit, winning the stage 23 seconds ahead of Alejandro Valverde. It was the first Tour de France stage win by an American since Tyler Farrar won stage 3 in 2011. Kuss, who lives in Andorra, said after the stage that he knew the climb well from training, and had been particularly motivated to win so close to home.

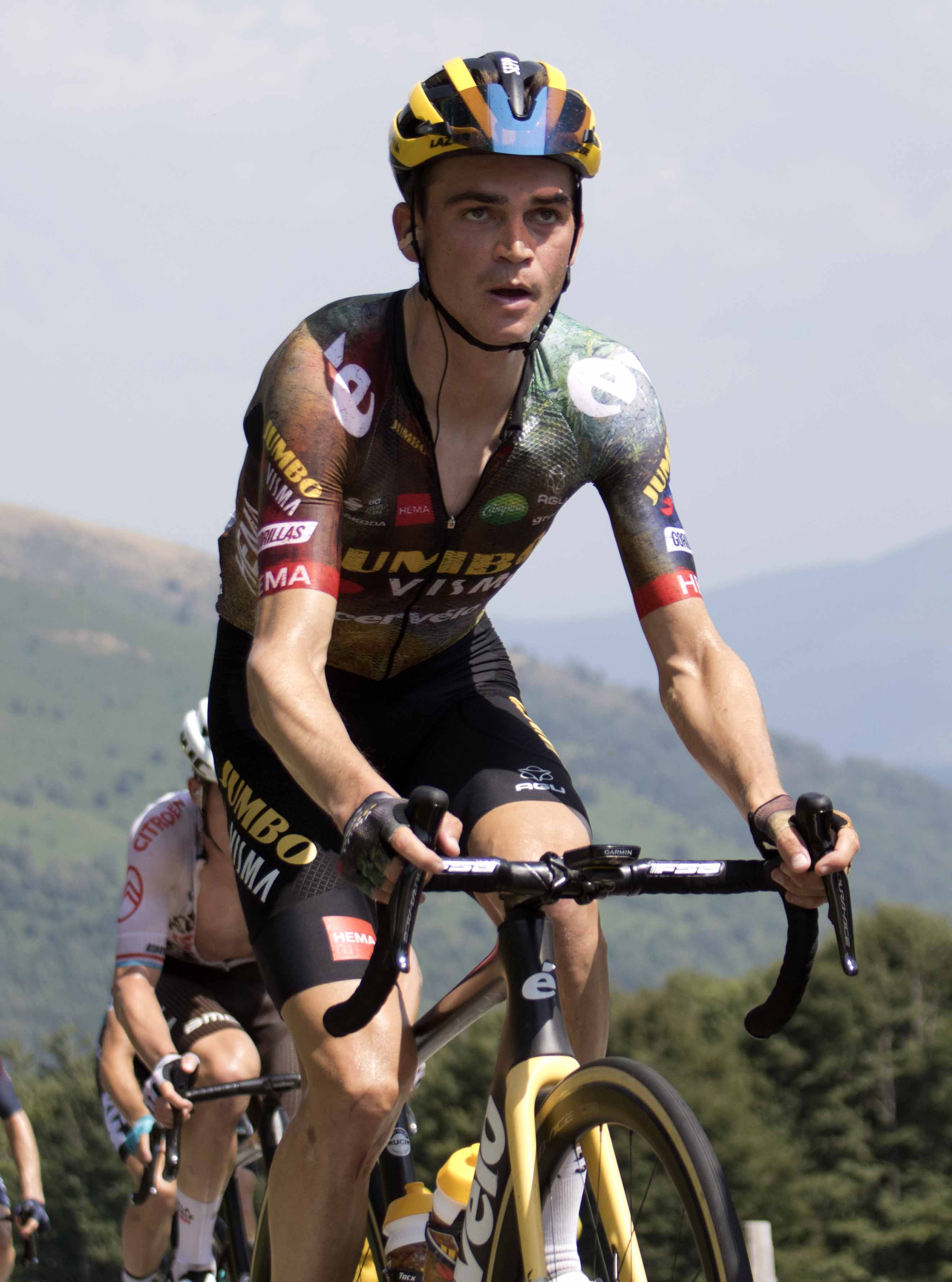
Kuss at the 2022 Tour de France

During the 2021 Vuelta a España Kuss and his teammates rode in support of Roglič, who was aiming to win his third consecutive Vuelta title. Kuss started the race well, holding the King of the Mountains jersey for the first two stages. On the decisive stage 17 to Lagos de Covadonga, where Roglič won the stage and took the overall lead, Kuss showed his own climbing strength by winning the sprint for second place and denying bonus seconds to Roglič's rivals. Roglič went on to win the race, while Kuss finished eighth overall, his first top 10 in a Grand Tour.

As a warmup for the 2022 Tour de France, Jumbo-Visma sent their primary favorites Roglič and Jonas Vingegaard to the Critérium du Dauphiné, while Kuss was given team leadership and the opportunity to target the overall win at the Tour de Suisse. Kuss was in contention, sitting 10 seconds back from the lead after stage 4, but prior to stage 5 the entire team withdrew from the race due to a COVID-19 infection.

During the Tour, Kuss rode in support of Roglič and Vingegaard as the team sought to challenge two-time defending champion Tadej Pogačar. After Roglič and key mountain domestique Steven Kruijswijk both crashed out of the race, the burden of defending Vingegaard in the high mountains fell primarily on Kuss. On stage 17, Kuss led Vingegaard up the final climb to Hautacam, passing Vingegaard off to teammate Wout van Aert before Vingegaard attacked to win the stage and secure his overall lead. Vingegaard held both the yellow and polka dot jerseys to the end of the race, with Jumbo-Visma also winning the points classification with Van Aert.

==== 2023–present: Grand Tour champion ====
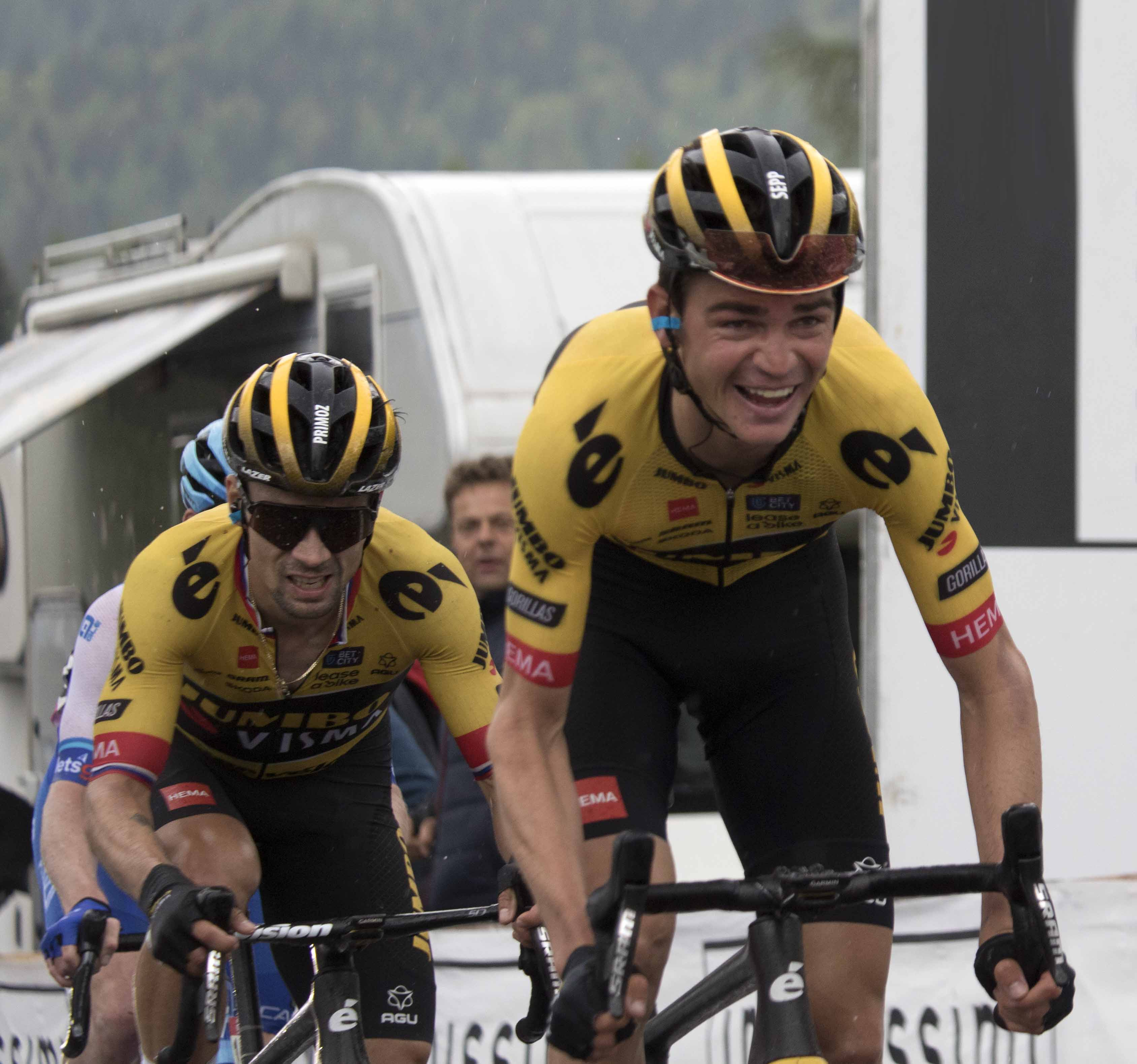
Kuss (right) riding in support of Primož Roglič at the 2023 Giro d'Italia

Kuss started the 2023 season at the UAE Tour, where he finished 5th overall. Following an injury to teammate Wilco Kelderman, Kuss was selected as his replacement for the Giro d'Italia, changing plans with less than a month before the race. At the Giro, Kuss rode in support of Roglič, who won the general classification. Kuss was widely credited as Roglič's top domestique, particularly for his role on stage 16, where Roglič was distanced by João Almeida and Geraint Thomas. Kuss's pace-making helped limit the gap, a performance one cycling journalist described as helping to "save the Giro for his leader."

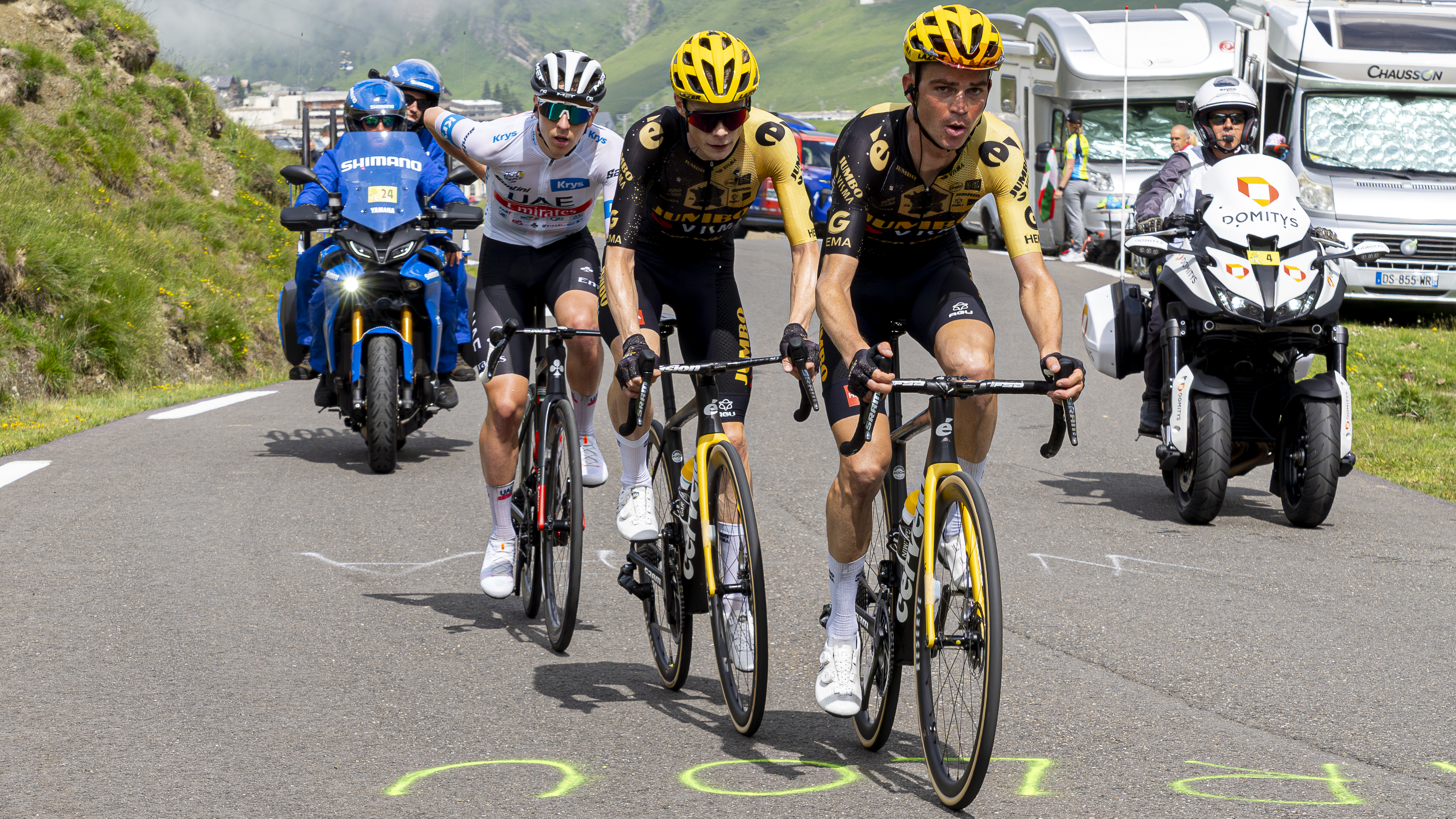
Kuss (right) riding in support of Jonas Vingegaard at the 2023 Tour de France

In July, Kuss rode in the Tour de France, this time helping Vingegaard win a second consecutive title. This marked the sixth time Kuss had supported his team leader to a Grand Tour victory. Despite crashing hard on the penultimate stage, Kuss finished in 12th overall, his best result at the Tour.

In August, Kuss was named to the startlist of the Vuelta a España, his third Grand Tour of the year, riding alongside both Roglič and Vingegaard as Team Jumbo–Visma attempted to become the first team to sweep the Grand Tours in a single season. At the Vuelta, Kuss's team took a disappointing 11th place in the opening stage time trial, which featured rain and multiple teams crashing. On stage 6, Kuss won by 26 seconds after attacking from a large breakaway group and riding solo for the final 2.5 km. The victory moved him into second in the general classification, eight seconds behind breakaway companion Lenny Martinez. Two days later, Kuss finished a minute ahead of Martinez on the difficult final climb to Xorret de Catí, moving into the lead of the race. On stage 13, Kuss's teammate Vingegaard won the stage, with Kuss taking second and Roglič third; this placed the Jumbo-Visma team in the top 3 positions of the general classification. Despite losing time to his teammates, notably being dropped by both on stage 17 to Alto de L'Angliru, Kuss successfully defended his lead for the remainder of the race. After his win, Kuss was celebrated for multiple milestones: he became the first cyclist to ride all three Grand Tours and win one in the same season since Gastone Nencini in 1957, the fourth American to win a Grand Tour, (Note: Following Greg LeMond (winner of three Tour de France titles between 1986 and 1990), Andrew Hampsten (Giro d'Italia champion in 1988), and Chris Horner (Vuelta a España champion in 2013). This count excludes Lance Armstrong (seven Tour wins from 1999 to 2005) and Floyd Landis (2006 Tour), both of whom were stripped of their titles due to doping violations.) and the first American since Chris Horner in 2013. His win also completed Jumbo-Visma's historic sweep of the Grand Tours, the first team to do so in a single season, along with sweeping the Vuelta podium—an achievement The Guardian described as "unprecedented dominance."

Following the Vuelta, the fitness-tracking app Strava announced Kuss had set 808 KOMs—a virtual trophy for the fastest time on a segment—across the year, the most of any professional athlete. In total, Kuss' logged activities on the app covered 29,007 kilometres (18,024 mi) and 547,019 metres (1,794,682 ft) of elevation gain. This included setting multiple KOMs in every Grand Tour of 2023.

In 2024, Kuss was originally named in his team's start list for the Tour de France, but was scratched before the race began due to a COVID-19 infection. Despite the interruption to his preparation, Kuss won his next race, the Vuelta a Burgos. He took the race lead on stage 3, winning on the mountain-top finish, then defending to take the overall win by 5 seconds over Max Poole. Kuss started the 2024 Vuelta a España, but was unable to defend his title and finished the race in 14th place.

At the start of the 2025 season, Kuss and his team announced that he would be returning to his "super-domestique role" rather than taking a leadership role during stage races. Kuss cited pressure and lack of results during the 2024 season as reasons for the shift. Kuss rode in the Tour de France, and was active in breakaways as well as pacing for team leader Vingegaard, who finished second overall.

In 2026, Kuss rode the Giro d'Italia in support of Vingegaard. On stage 19, considered the queen stage or hardest stage of the race, Kuss joined the breakaway. After a difficult and tactical day of racing, Kuss passed Giulio Ciccone on the final climb of Piani di Pezzè to win the stage. He became the 116th rider to win a stage at all three Grand Tours.

Kuss was selected for the 2026 Tour de France. He got into the breakaway on stage twenty, and was in the lead, when he crashed twice in the final kilometres, and was passed by Richard Carapaz. He came in third, and won most combative for the stage.

== Personal life ==
Kuss is of Slovenian and Italian descent, with his great-grandparents immigrating from Europe to Colorado in the 1800s.

Kuss speaks Spanish in addition to English.

In 2022, Kuss married Noemí Ferré Fernández, a Spanish former professional cyclist. In 2024, Kuss and Fernández had their first child. They live in Andorra, a popular location for cyclists due to its high altitude and famous climbs. Kuss is known for setting climbing records on local climbs during training.

== Major results ==
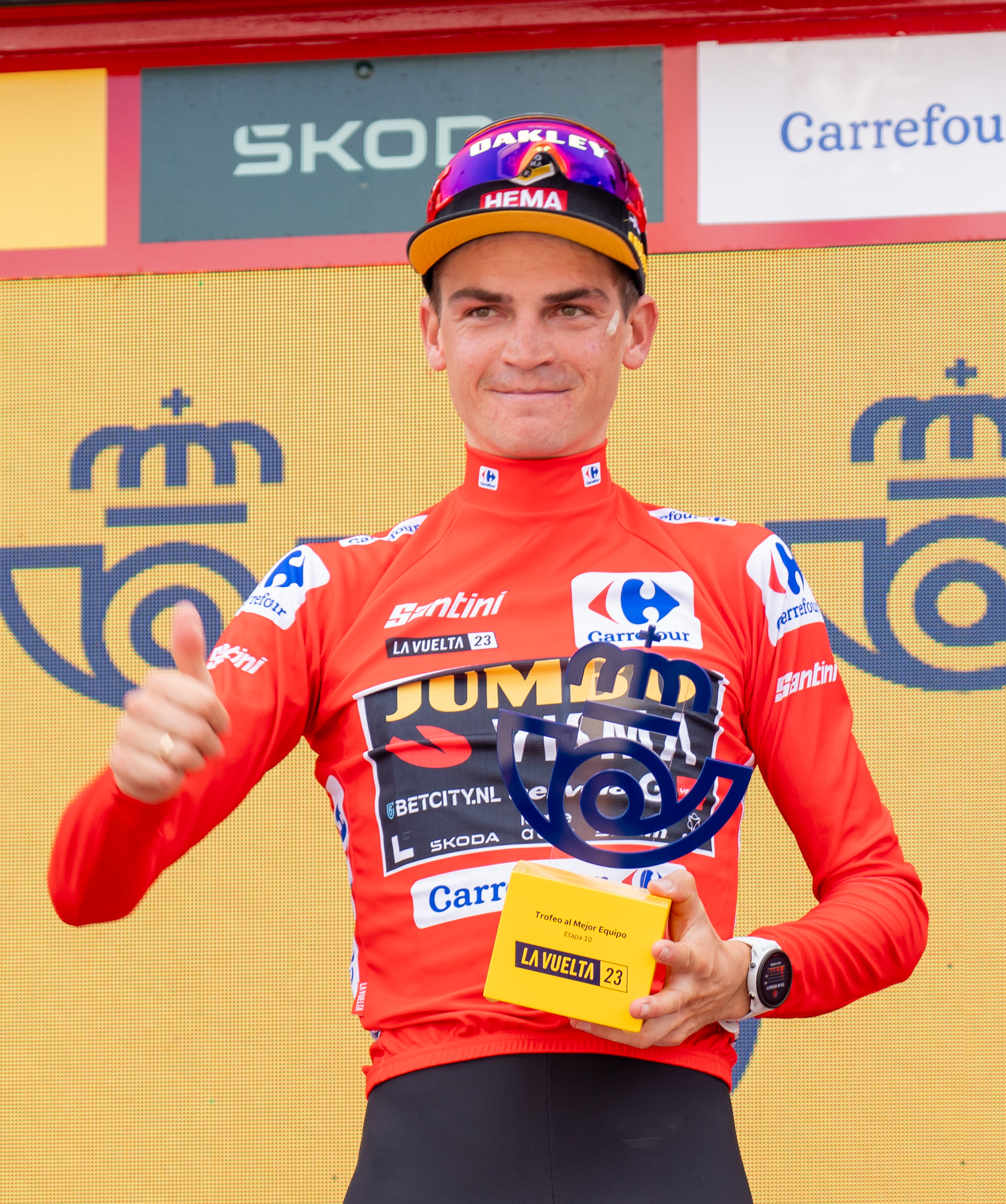
Kuss wearing the red leader's jersey at the 2023 Vuelta a España

=== Mountain bike ===
2014
National Collegiate Championships

1st Cross-country
1st Short track

2015
1st Cross-country, National Collegiate Championships

=== Road ===
2016
1st Stage 2 Redlands Bicycle Classic
6th Overall Tour de Beauce

1st Stage 2

2017
2nd Overall Tour of Alberta
6th Overall Colorado Classic
8th Overall Tour of the Gila
9th Overall Tour of Utah
2018 (4 pro wins)
1st Overall Tour of Utah

1st Mountains classification
1st Stages 2, 5 & 6

2019 (1)
1st Stage 15 Vuelta a España
5th Japan Cup
2020 (1)
8th Overall Tour de la Provence
10th Overall Critérium du Dauphiné

1st Stage 5

Vuelta a España

Held after Stage 1

2021 (1)
1st Stage 15 Tour de France
8th Overall Vuelta a España

Held after Stages 1 & 2

2022
1st Stage 1 (TTT) Vuelta a España
3rd Faun-Ardèche Classic
2023 (2)
1st Overall Vuelta a España

1st Stage 6

5th Overall UAE Tour
2024 (2)
1st Overall Vuelta a Burgos

1st Stage 3

1st Mountains classification, Tour of the Basque Country
6th Clásica Jaén Paraíso Interior
8th Overall Volta ao Algarve
2025
7th Overall Vuelta a España
2026 (1)
1st Stage 19 Giro d'Italia
Tour de France

1st Stage 1 (TTT)
Combativity award Stage 20

3rd Andorra MoraBanc Clàssica
5th Overall Vuelta a España

==== General classification results timeline ====
Grand Tour general classification results
Grand Tour	2018	2019	2020	2021	2022	2023	2024	2025	2026
Giro d'Italia	—	56	—	—	—	14	—	—	13
Tour de France	—	—	15	32	17	12	—	17	13
Vuelta a España	65	29	16	8	DNF	1	14	7	5
Major stage race general classification results
Race	2018	2019	2020	2021	2022	2023	2024	2025	2026
Paris–Nice	—	—	—	—	—	—	—	—	—
Tirreno–Adriatico	—	—	—	—	68	—	—	—	—
Volta a Catalunya	—	DNF	NH	12	—	19	13	23	22
Tour of the Basque Country	DNF	95	NH	—	DNF	—	41	DNF	—
Tour de Romandie	—	—	NH	14	12	—	—	—	—
Critérium du Dauphiné	34	26	10	23	—	—	DNF	13	—
Tour de Suisse	—	—	NH	—	DNF	—	—	—	—

Legend
—	Did not compete
NH	Race not held
DNF	Did not finish
