= Jarrad Drizners =

Australian cyclist (born 1999)

Personal information
- Full name: Jarrad Eriks Drizners
- Born: 31 May 1999 (age 27) Adelaide, South Australia

Cycling career
- Sport: Cycling
- Current team: Red Bull–Bora–Hansgrohe
- Discipline: Road
- Role: Rider

Amateur teams
- 2017–2018: SASI
- 2019: InForm TM Insight MAKE

Professional teams
- 2020–2021: Hagens Berman Axeon
- 2022–2025: Lotto–Soudal
- 2026–: Red Bull–Bora–Hansgrohe

Jarrad Eriks Drizners (born 31 May 1999) is an Australian racing cyclist, who currently rides for UCI WorldTeam Red Bull–Bora–Hansgrohe.

== Career ==
In January 2020, Drizners won the Under-23 national road race championship, which led to his inclusion in the Australian national team that competed at the 2020 Tour Down Under. There, he took the lead in the mountains classification after Stage 1 by being part of the day's breakaway group.

On 29 September 2021, it was announced that Drizners would be joining Lotto–Soudal in 2022 on a two-year deal, with the team citing his main roles being in the classics and in the lead-out train for Caleb Ewan.

== Major results ==
2020
1st Road race, National Under-23 Road Championships
2021
4th Overall Flanders Tomorrow Tour
2022
1st Mountains classification, Tour de Pologne

=== Grand Tour general classification results timeline ===
Grand Tour	2022	2023	2024	2025
Giro d'Italia	—	—	—	—
Tour de France	—	—	139	129
Vuelta a España	DNF	145	—	

Legend
—	Did not compete
DNF	Did not finish

== Personal life ==
Drizners grandparents are from Latvia.
