= Geoffrey Soupe =

French road racing cyclist

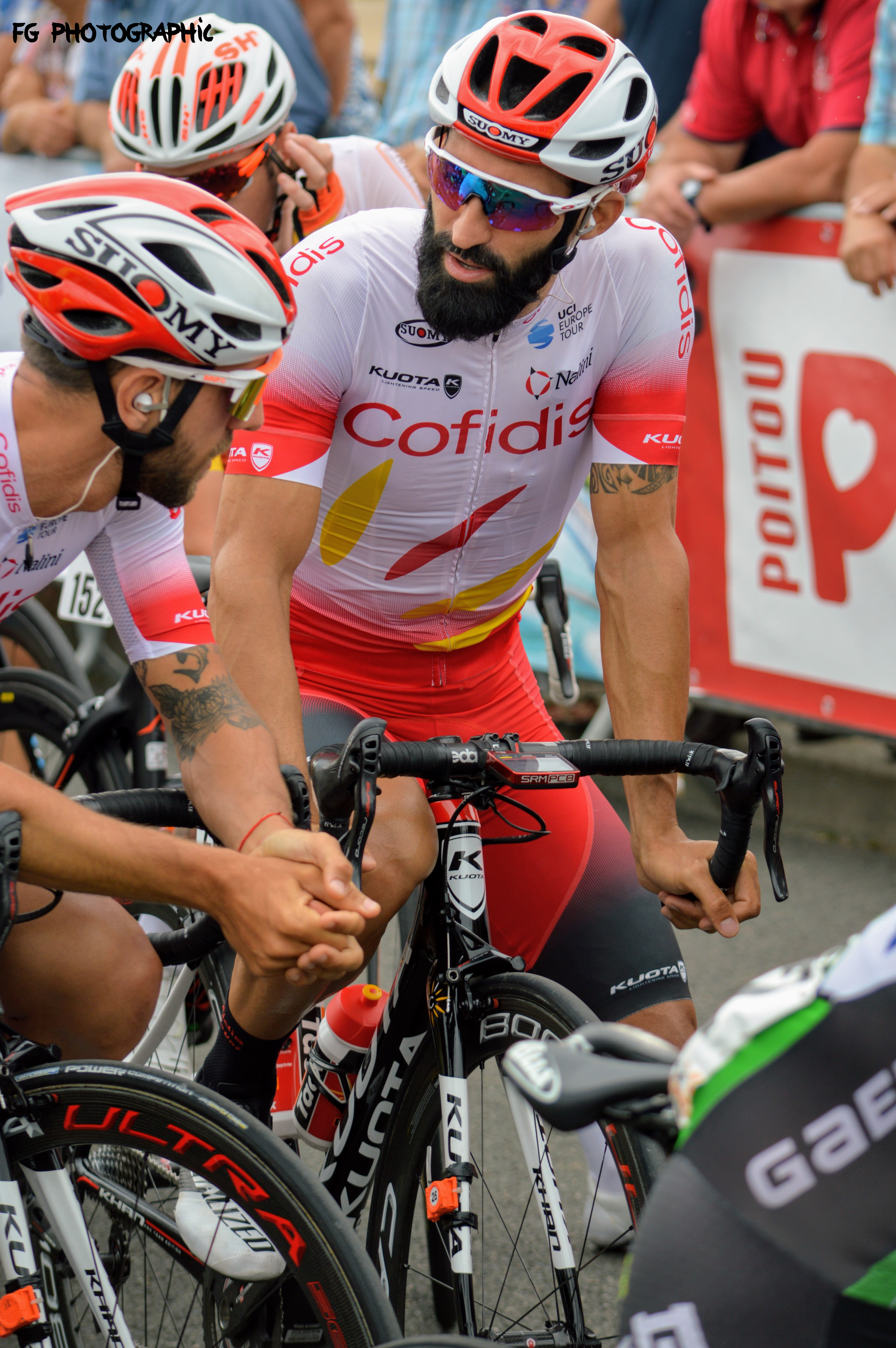
- Soupe in 2019

Personal information
- Full name: Geoffrey Soupe
- Born: 22 March 1988 (age 38) Viriat, Ain, France
- Height: 1.77 m (5 ft 10 in)
- Weight: 68 kg (150 lb; 10.7 st)

Cycling career
- Sport: Cycling
- Discipline: Road
- Role: Rider
- Rider type: Lead out man; Baroudeur

Amateur teams
- 2004: EC Bourg-en-Bresse (junior)
- 2005–2006: VC Bressan (junior)
- 2007–2008: VC Vaulx-en-Velin (junior)
- 2009–2010: CC Étupes le Doubs

Professional teams
- 2011–2014: FDJ
- 2015–2019: Cofidis
- 2020–2025: Total Direct Énergie

Major wins
- Grand Tours Vuelta a España 1 individual stage (2023)

Geoffrey Soupe (born 22 March 1988) is a former French professional road bicycle racer, who most recently rode for UCI ProTeam Team TotalEnergies. Primarily a lead out man and baroudeur, Soupe has taken four victories during his professional career, including a stage win at the 2023 Vuelta a España with his remaining wins coming at La Tropicale Amissa Bongo – stage victories in 2011 and 2023, along with the general classification in 2023.

== Career ==
Born in Viriat, Ain, Soupe competed for the EC Bourg-en-Bresse, VC Bressan and VC Vaulx-en-Velin setups as a junior, and the CC Étupes le Doubs squad as an amateur; in 2010, Soupe won the under-23 French National Road Race Championships, and finished second to Great Britain's Alex Dowsett in the under-23 time trial at the European Road Championships.

=== FDJ (2011–2014) ===
Soupe then joined the FDJ professional team for the 2011 season as a neo-pro. In his first race for the team, Soupe won the opening stage of La Tropicale Amissa Bongo in Gabon – beating Team Europcar's Anthony Charteau in a two-man sprint – before finishing the race in eighth place overall. Soupe later added a stage victory in the Tour Alsace, before quitting the race the next day.

Soupe made his Grand Tour début at the 2012 Giro d'Italia, taking a third-place finish during the race's first mass-start stage in Herning, Denmark; a result that Soupe stated that he was "sorry" for, after he was supposed to be leading out the team's main sprinter Arnaud Démare, until he was caught up in a final-corner crash.

=== Cofidis (2015–2019) ===
In August 2014 Cofidis announced that they had signed Soupe, alongside FDJ teammate Nacer Bouhanni, for 2015. He made his first start at the Tour de France in the 2015 edition, sharing sprint duties with Christophe Laporte, following Bouhanni's withdrawal in the opening week. Over his five years with the team, Soupe recorded two top-ten individual finishes – sixth at the 2017 La Roue Tourangelle, and eighth at the 2019 Elfstedenronde.

=== Total Direct Énergie (2020–present) ===
Soupe joined Total Direct Énergie for the 2020 season, and finished ninth overall in his first race with the team at the Saudi Tour. He took his first victory since 2011 at the 2023 La Tropicale Amissa Bongo, when he won the opening stage of the race in Gabon. Having lost the overall lead to teammate Jason Tesson, Soupe regained the lead when Tesson lost time on the penultimate day, and Soupe ultimately won by approximately half a minute from his next closest challenger. Later in the 2023 season, Soupe secured his first Grand Tour stage victory at the Vuelta a España, where he won the seventh stage in a bunch sprint.

== Major results ==
2008
1st Overall Tour du Béarn
2009
National Under-23 Road Championships

2nd Road race
3rd Time trial

2nd Overall Boucles de la Marne
3rd Souvenir Michel Roques
5th Chrono des Herbiers
8th Time trial, UEC European Under-23 Road Championships
2010
1st Road race, National Under-23 Road Championships
2nd Time trial, UEC European Under-23 Road Championships
10th Time trial, UCI Under-23 Road World Championships
2011
1st Stage 1 Tour Alsace
5th Ronde Pévéloise
8th Overall La Tropicale Amissa Bongo

1st Stage 1

2012
5th Tour du Doubs
2013
10th Overall Four Days of Dunkirk
2017
6th La Roue Tourangelle
2019
8th Elfstedenronde
2020
9th Overall Saudi Tour
2023
1st Overall La Tropicale Amissa Bongo

1st Points classification
1st Stage 1

1st Stage 7 Vuelta a España

=== Grand Tour general classification results timeline ===
Grand Tour	2012	2013	2014	2015	2016	2017	2018	2019	2020	2021	2022	2023
Giro d'Italia	76	—	—	—	—	—	—	—	—	—	—	—
Tour de France	—	—	—	123	142	—	—	—	123	—	—	—
Vuelta a España	—	DNF	94	DNF	—	—	—	—	—	—	—	101

Legend
—	Did not compete
DNF	Did not finish
