= Kaden Groves =

Australian cyclist (born 1998)

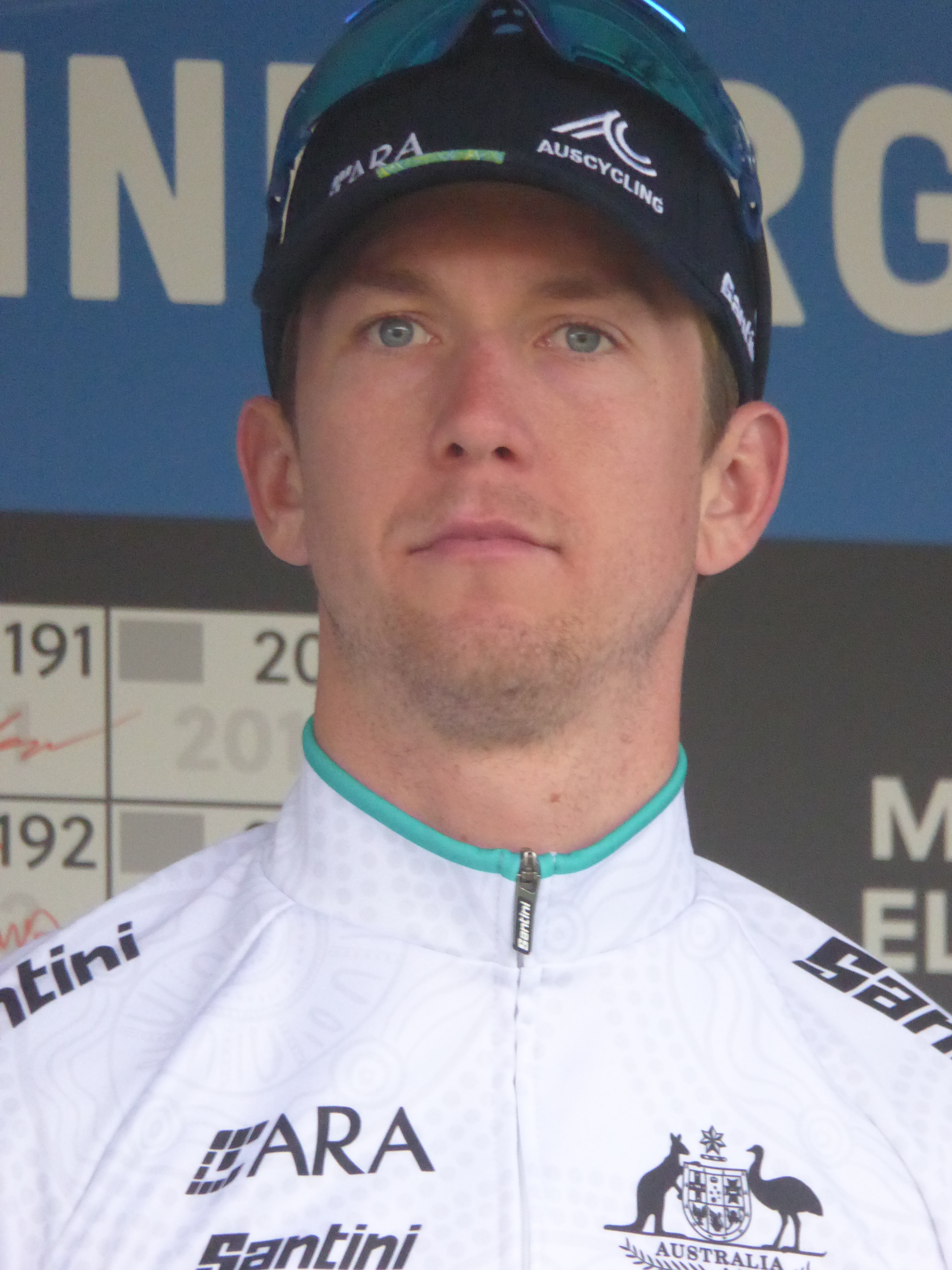
- Groves in 2023

Personal information
- Full name: Kaden Groves
- Nickname: Skip
- Born: 23 December 1998 (age 27) Gympie
- Height: 1.78 m (5 ft 10 in)
- Weight: 78 kg (172 lb)

Cycling career
- Sport: Cycling
- Current team: Alpecin–Premier Tech
- Discipline: Road
- Role: Rider
- Rider type: Sprinter

Professional teams
- 2017–2018: St George Continental Cycling Team
- 2018: Mitchelton–BikeExchange
- 2019: SEG Racing Academy
- 2019: Mitchelton–Scott (stagiaire)
- 2020–2022: Mitchelton–Scott
- 2023–: Alpecin–Deceuninck

Major wins
- Grand Tours Tour de France 1 individual stage (2025) Giro d'Italia 2 individual stages (2023, 2025) Vuelta a España Points classification (2023, 2024) 7 individual stages (2022, 2023, 2024)

Kaden Groves (born 23 December 1998) is an Australian cyclist who currently rides for UCI WorldTeam Alpecin–Premier Tech. Groves is a sprinter with speed on flat races, but who can also climb better than most sprinters.

== Career ==
Groves was the 2016 winner of the junior race at the Australian National Road Race Championships. In 2017, Groves finished runner-up in the prologue stage of the Tour de Kumano. He won stage 3 of the Tour of Fuzhou.

In August 2019, Groves joined UCI WorldTeam Mitchelton–Scott as a stagiaire for the second half of the season, before joining the team permanently in 2020. In 2022, he won his first Grand Tour stage, when he won stage 11 of the Vuelta a España in a sprint finish. In 2023 he won stage 5 of the Giro d'Italia. He won stage 20 of the Tour de France 2025, which included a Category 2 climb, going out solo with about 17 kilometres remaining in the stage.

== Major results ==
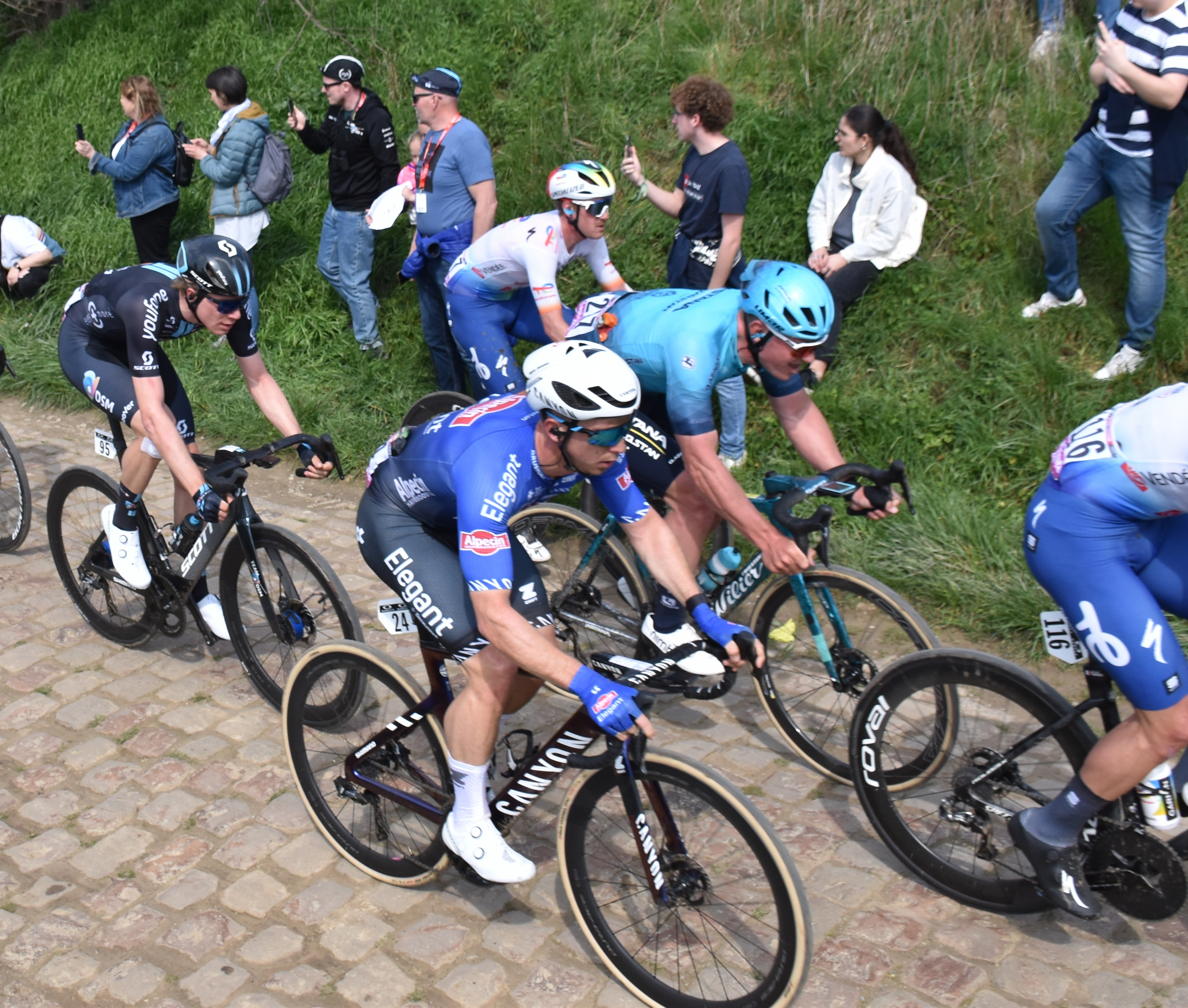
Groves at the 2023 Paris–Roubaix

2016
1st Road race, National Junior Road Championships
2017 (1 pro win)
1st Stage 3 Tour of Fuzhou
1st Team time trial, Queensland State Road Championships
2018 (2)
1st Stage 13 Tour of Qinghai Lake
1st Stage 5 Tour of Fuzhou
1st Stage 1 Tour of Quanzhou Bay
3rd Overall Tour of China II

1st Points classification

2019
Le Triptyque des Monts et Châteaux

1st Stages 1 & 3

1st Stage 1 Ronde de l'Isard
2nd Eschborn–Frankfurt Under-23
4th Overall Circuit des Ardennes

1st Points classification
1st Stages 1 & 4

8th Liège–Bastogne–Liège Espoirs
10th Brussels Cycling Classic
2020 (2)
Herald Sun Tour

1st Stages 3 & 5

1st Stage 1 (TTT) Czech Cycling Tour
4th Race Torquay
2021 (1)
1st Criterium, National Road Championships
1st Prologue Okolo Slovenska
2022 (3)
1st Stage 11 Vuelta a España
Volta a Catalunya

1st Points classification
1st Stage 2

1st Stage 2 Tour of Turkey
3rd Overall Tour of Estonia

1st Points classification

2023 (7)
1st Volta Limburg Classic
Vuelta a España

1st Points classification
1st Stages 4, 5 & 21

1st Stage 5 Giro d'Italia
Volta a Catalunya

1st Stages 4 & 6

2nd Münsterland Giro
2nd Famenne Ardenne Classic
3rd Schwalbe Classic
2024 (3)
Vuelta a España

1st Points classification
1st Stages 2, 14 & 17

3rd Brussels Cycling Classic
10th Circuit Franco-Belge
2025 (2)
1st Stage 20 Tour de France
1st Stage 6 Giro d'Italia
5th Milan–San Remo

=== Grand Tour general classification results timeline ===
Grand Tour	2019	2020	2021	2022	2023	2024	2025	2026
Giro d'Italia	—	—	—	—	DNF	91	107	DNF
Tour de France	—	—	—	—	—	—	86	
Vuelta a España	—	—	—	113	122	100	—	

Legend
—	Did not compete
DNF	Did not finish
