= David González (cyclist) =

Spanish cyclist

Personal information
- Full name: David González López
- Born: 21 February 1996 (age 30) Fontiveros, Spain
- Height: 1.8 m (5 ft 11 in)
- Weight: 68 kg (150 lb)

Cycling career
- Sport: Cycling
- Current team: Pinarello–Q36.5 Pro Cycling Team
- Discipline: Road
- Role: Rider

Amateur teams
- 2015–2017: Super Froiz
- 2018: Caja Rural–Seguros RGA Amateur

Professional teams
- 2019–2024: Caja Rural–Seguros RGA
- 2025–: Q36.5 Pro Cycling Team

David González López (born 21 February 1996 in Fontiveros) is a Spanish cyclist, who currently rides for UCI ProTeam Pinarello–Q36.5 Pro Cycling Team.

== Major results ==
2021
5th Clàssica Comunitat Valenciana 1969
2022
1st Mountains classification, Vuelta a Castilla y León
2023
1st Stage 1 Troféu Joaquim Agostinho
2024
4th Gran Premio Castellón
10th Grand Prix du Morbihan

=== Grand Tour general classification results timeline ===
| Grand Tour | 2023 |
|---|---|
| Giro d'Italia | — |
| Tour de France | — |
| Vuelta a España | 106 |
