= 2026 Tour de France =

Cycling race

2026 UCI World Tour, race 26 of 36
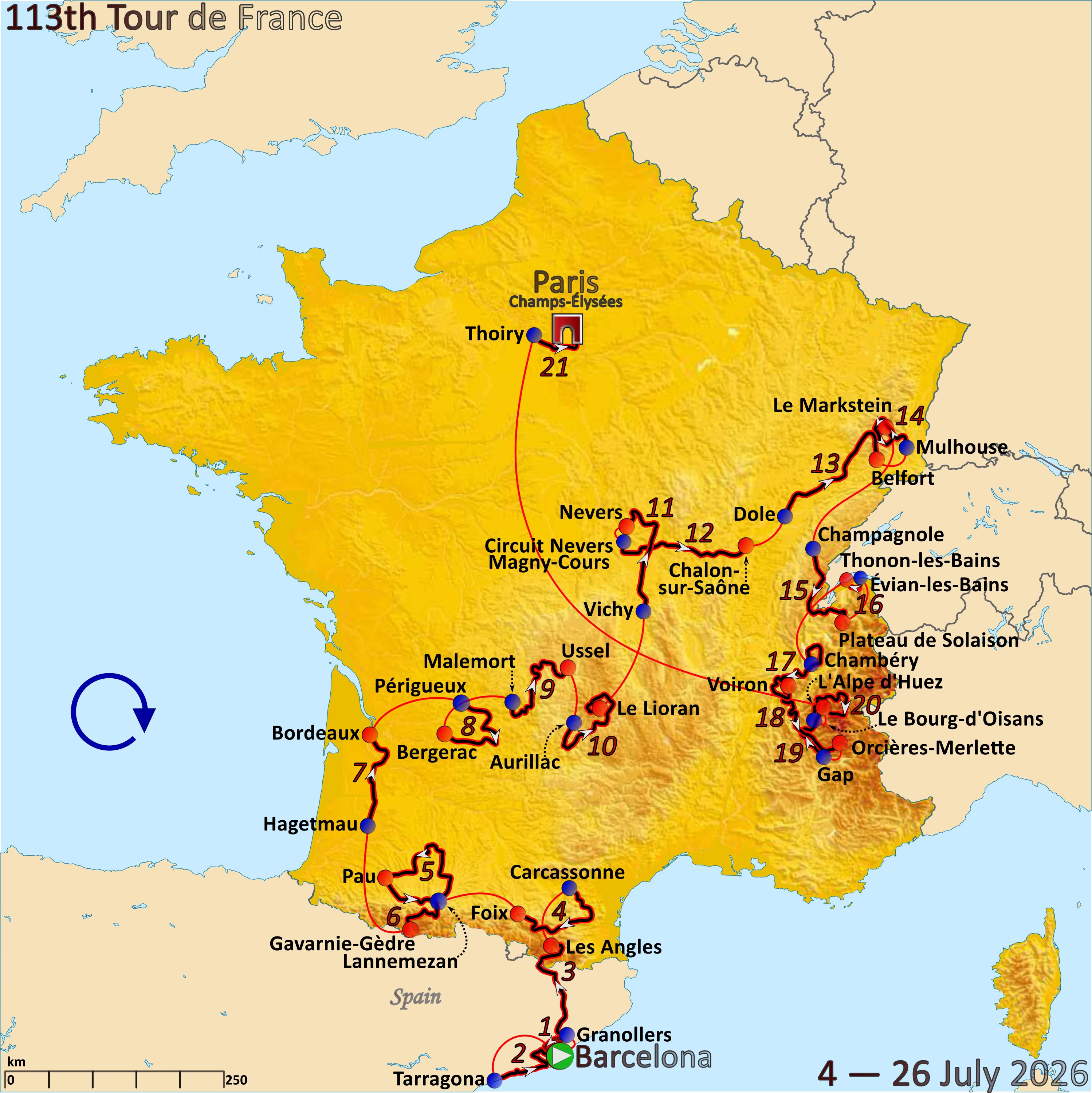

Race details
- Dates: 4–26 July 2026
- Stages: 21
- Distance: 3,245 (Note: The ninth stage was originally scheduled to be contested over 185.5 km (115.3 mi) but due to a red heatwave warning issued for the Corrèze department, the stage was shortened by 30.9 km (19.2 mi); neither start or finish location was altered.) (Note: The twenty-first stage was originally scheduled to start in Thoiry and be contested over 132.5 km (82.3 mi), but due to a redeployment of security staff to the Gironde department following wildfires, the stage was shortened by 43.8 km (27.2 mi). All pre-stage activities were held in Thoiry, before a bus transfer to Paris, with the stage commencing on the Champs-Élysées. Two additional laps of the Champs-Élysées circuit were added, prior to the three circuits including the climb of Montmartre.) km (2,016 mi)
- Winning time: 73h 56' 26"

Results
Jersey awarded to the overall winner	Winner	Tadej Pogačar (SLO)	(UAE Team Emirates XRG)
	Second	Remco Evenepoel (BEL)	(Red Bull–Bora–Hansgrohe)
	Third	Isaac del Toro (MEX)	(UAE Team Emirates XRG)
Jersey awarded to the points classification winner	Points	Mads Pedersen (DEN)	(Lidl–Trek)
Jersey awarded to the mountains classification winner	Mountains	Richard Carapaz (ECU)	(EF Education–EasyPost)
Jersey awarded to the young rider classification winner	Young rider	Isaac del Toro (MEX)	(UAE Team Emirates XRG)
Jersey awarded to the combativity classification winner	Combativity	Richard Carapaz (ECU)	(EF Education–EasyPost)
Jersey awarded to the team classification winner	Team	(Germany) Lidl–Trek	

The 2026 Tour de France was the 113th edition of the Tour de France. The race began with a stage in Barcelona, Spain, on 4 July, and finished with the final stage at the Champs-Élysées, Paris, on 26 July.

Tadej Pogačar of UAE Team Emirates XRG won the general classification for the fifth time, and the third year running. His attack on stage 6, at the Col du Tourmalet in the Pyrenees, established a lead over his main rival Jonas Vingegaard of Visma–Lease a Bike. Pogačar extended his lead with victories on three mountain stages: stage 10 in the Massif Central, stage 14 in Vosges, and stage 19 to Alpe d'Huez in the French Alps. Pogačar's final margin of victory was almost six and a half minutes. It was the fastest race on record, with Pogačar having an average speed of 43.227 kilometres per hour (26.860 mph) over the three weeks of racing.

Second place overall went to Remco Evenepoel of Red Bull–Bora–Hansgrohe, after Vingegaard withdrew from the race following a crash on stage 15. Evenepoel took his first mountain stage victory at Plateau de Solaison on stage 15 and then won the individual time trial to Thonon-les-Bains in stage 16. Third place went to Isaac del Toro, a Tour debutant. On stage 20, Pogačar assisted his teammate Del Toro, to ensure that Del Toro held off fellow Tour debutant Paul Seixas of Decathlon CMA CGM for third place overall and the young rider classification as the best rider under the age of 26.

The race was affected by a heatwave, with two stages shortened and rules relaxed to allow for riders to stay hydrated. Prior to stage 15, both Pogačar and Vingegaard were woken in the middle of the night to take doping tests, which generated substantial debate.

The points classification was won by Mads Pedersen of Lidl–Trek. Pedersen won only one stage (stage 4), but consistently placed highly in the intermediate sprints and secured points in other sprint finishes. The mountains classification went to Richard Carapaz of EF Education–EasyPost, who won two mountain stages in the French Alps in the last week. Carapaz also won the award for the race's most combative rider. The teams classification was won by Lidl–Trek.

== Teams ==
Twenty-three teams took part in the race. All 18 UCI WorldTeams were automatically invited. They were joined by five UCI ProTeams: the three highest ranked UCI ProTeams in 2025 (Tudor Pro Cycling Team, Pinarello–Q36.5 Pro Cycling Team and Cofidis), along with two teams (Team TotalEnergies and Caja Rural–Seguros RGA) selected by Amaury Sport Organisation (ASO), the organisers of the Tour. The teams were announced on 30 January 2026. Unibet Rose Rockets had expected to be invited, however Caja Rural-Seguros RGA was chosen instead – which Tour de France director Christian Prudhomme explained was due to Caja Rural-Seguros RGA's performances in 2025, which included finishing fourth in the team classification at the 2025 Vuelta a España.

UCI WorldTeams

- Alpecin–Premier Tech
- Decathlon CMA CGM
- EF Education–EasyPost
- Groupama–FDJ United
- Lidl–Trek
- Lotto–Intermarché
- Movistar Team
- Netcompany INEOS
- NSN Cycling Team
- Red Bull–Bora–Hansgrohe
- Soudal–Quick-Step
- Team Bahrain Victorious
- Team Jayco–AlUla
- Team Picnic–PostNL
- UAE Team Emirates XRG
- Uno-X Mobility
- Visma–Lease a Bike
- XDS Astana Team

UCI ProTeams

- Caja Rural–Seguros RGA
- Cofidis
- Pinarello–Q36.5 Pro Cycling Team
- Team TotalEnergies
- Tudor Pro Cycling Team

A total of 184 riders from 27 nationalities participated in the race, with Belgium having the largest contingent (31 riders).

== Route and stages ==
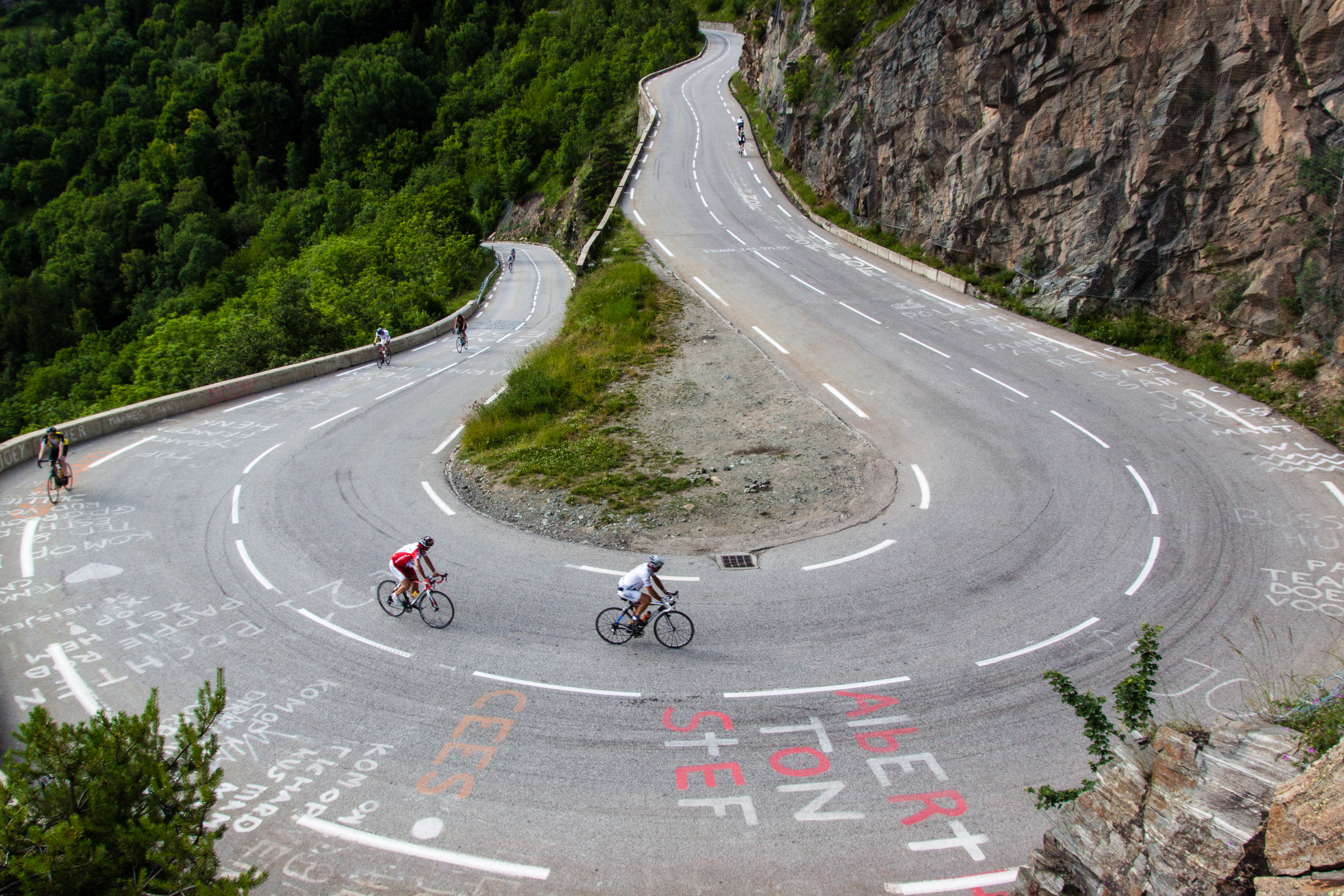
Stage 19 finished at the top of Alpe d'Huez; the climb is 13.8 km (8.6 mi) long, an average gradient of 7.9% and features 21 hairpin turns.

In February 2025, race organisers ASO announced that Barcelona in Spain would host the Grand Départ (first stage). This was the third time the Grand Départ was held in Spain, after San Sebastián in 1992 and Bilbao in 2023. The first two stages finished on the Montjuïc hill above Barcelona, next to the Estadi Olímpic Lluís Companys used for the 1992 Summer Olympics. Following protests against the Gaza war that disrupted the 2025 Vuelta a España, the City Council of Barcelona expressed a desire to host the Grand Départ without the Israel–Premier Tech team, with protestors threatening to disrupt the Tour if they took part. The Israel–Premier Tech team subsequently rebranded as NSN Cycling Team for the 2026 season, and rode under a Swiss license.

The full route was announced on 23 October 2025 by Christian Prudhomme, who described it as having a crescendo towards the finish. There were five summit finishes, including Plateau de Solaison for the first time and two finishes at Alpe d'Huez. The race featured only 26 km (16 mi) of individual time trial, with a team time trial starting the Tour for the first time since 1971. The team time trial returned to the Tour for the first time since 2019, and used new rules previously introduced at the 2023 Paris–Nice. In this format, each rider is given an individual finish time, rather than all riders who finish together getting the same time. This format encourages tactical choices by general classification contenders – whether to ride with the rest of their team to save energy, or ride solo to achieve a better time.

Cyclist described the route as "ripe for breakaways" and Rouleur considered that it would suit Pogačar, because "the Slovenian superstar can do everything". Ned Boulting criticised the route, writing in Cycling Weekly that "there's no cobblestones, no obvious crosswind stages, and no gravel. [...] They have denuded this year [which] feels a little bit disappointing". Cycling News predicted that the pivotal stages would be stage 6 to Gavarnie-Gèdre (the first high mountain stage of the race in the Pyrenees), stage 14 to Le Markstein in the Vosges, the stage 16 individual time trial and the mountainous stages 19 & 20 to Alpe d'Huez in the French Alps. They described stage 20 as the queen stage, owing to its three hors catégorie climbs.

Stage characteristics
Stage	Date	Course	Distance	Type	Winner
1	4 July	Barcelona (Spain)	19.6 km (12.2 mi)	Team time trial	(Netherlands) Visma–Lease a Bike
2	5 July	Tarragona (Spain) to Barcelona (Spain)	168.5 km (104.7 mi)	Hilly stage	Isaac del Toro (MEX)
3	6 July	Granollers (Spain) to Les Angles	195.9 km (121.7 mi)	Mountain stage	Tadej Pogačar (SLO)
4	7 July	Carcassonne to Foix	181.9 km (113.0 mi)	Hilly stage	Mads Pedersen (DEN)
5	8 July	Lannemezan to Pau	158.3 km (98.4 mi)	Flat stage	Olav Kooij (NED)
6	9 July	Pau to Gavarnie-Gèdre	186.2 km (115.7 mi)	Mountain stage	Tadej Pogačar (SLO)
7	10 July	Hagetmau to Bordeaux	175.1 km (108.8 mi)	Flat stage	Tim Merlier (BEL)
8	11 July	Périgueux to Bergerac	180.4 km (112.1 mi)	Flat stage	Tim Merlier (BEL)
9	12 July	Malemort to Ussel	154.6 km (96.1 mi)	Hilly stage	Mathieu van der Poel (NED)
	13 July	Cantal	Rest day		
10	14 July	Aurillac to Le Lioran	166.6 km (103.5 mi)	Mountain stage	Tadej Pogačar (SLO)
11	15 July	Vichy to Nevers	161.3 km (100.2 mi)	Flat stage	Søren Wærenskjold (NOR)
12	16 July	Circuit de Nevers Magny-Cours to Chalon-sur-Saône	179.1 km (111.3 mi)	Flat stage	Tim Merlier (BEL)
13	17 July	Dole to Belfort	205.8 km (127.9 mi)	Hilly stage	Mauro Schmid (SUI)
14	18 July	Mulhouse to Le Markstein	155.3 km (96.5 mi)	Mountain stage	Tadej Pogačar (SLO)
15	19 July	Champagnole to Plateau de Solaison	183.9 km (114.3 mi)	Mountain stage	Remco Evenepoel (BEL)
	20 July	Haute-Savoie	Rest day		
16	21 July	Évian-les-Bains to Thonon-les-Bains	26.1 km (16.2 mi)	Individual time trial	Remco Evenepoel (BEL)
17	22 July	Chambéry to Voiron	174.7 km (108.6 mi)	Flat stage	Jasper Philipsen (BEL)
18	23 July	Voiron to Orcières-Merlette	185.2 km (115.1 mi)	Mountain stage	Richard Carapaz (ECU)
19	24 July	Gap to Alpe d'Huez	127.9 km (79.5 mi)	Mountain stage	Tadej Pogačar (SLO)
20	25 July	Le Bourg-d'Oisans to Alpe d'Huez	170.9 km (106.2 mi)	Mountain stage	Richard Carapaz (ECU)
21	26 July	Paris to Paris (Champs-Élysées)	88.7 km (55.1 mi)	Flat stage	Mathieu van der Poel (NED)
Total			3,245 km (2,016 mi)		

== Pre-race favourites ==
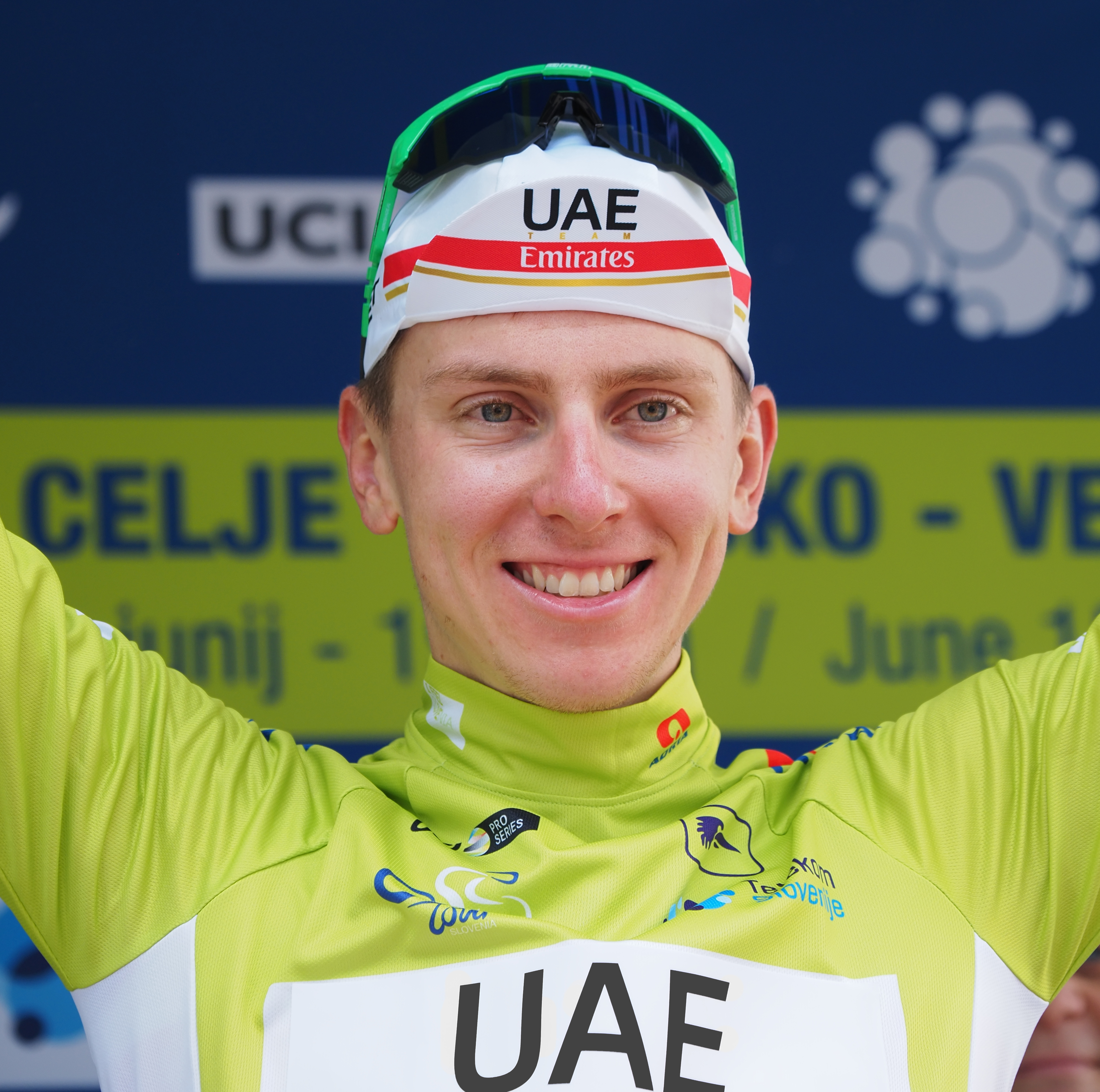
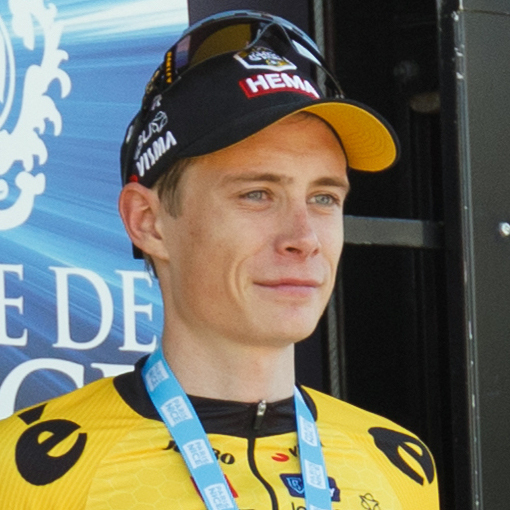
Tadej Pogačar (left) and Jonas Vingegaard (right) were considered favourites for the general classification (GC).

Prior to the race, Tadej Pogačar and Jonas Vingegaard were widely considered to be the major contenders for the overall general classification (GC), with the pair having won the last six editions of the Tour between them. Leading up to the race, defending champion Pogačar won the Tour de Suisse, and Vingegaard won the Giro d'Italia. Other riders considered contenders in the GC included Remco Evenepoel, Florian Lipowitz, Paul Seixas and Isaac del Toro.

Top competitors for the green jersey of the points classification were expected to be former winners Jasper Philipsen and Biniam Girmay, as well as Tim Merlier and Olav Kooij. Isaac del Toro and Paul Seixas were considered favourites for the white jersey of the young rider classification.

== Race overview ==
=== Grand Départ and first week in the Pyrenees ===
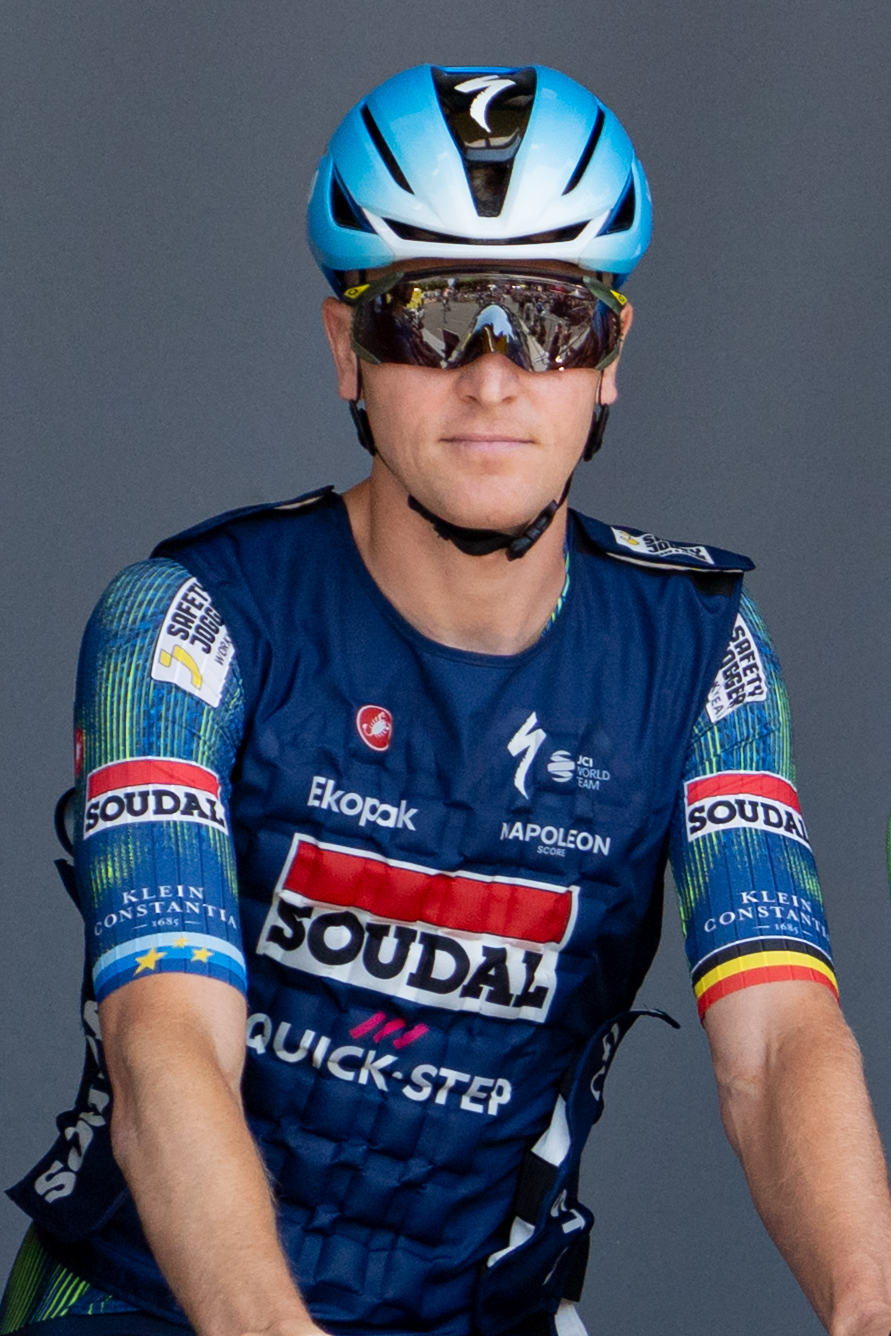
Tim Merlier (Soudal–Quick-Step) won stages 7, 8 and 12 in sprint finishes.

The first stage was a team time trial in Barcelona, Spain – with the finish atop the Montjuïc hill above the city. It used a new format where the time for each team would be determined by the first rider across the finish line – but each rider would receive their own time for the general classification. Visma–Lease a Bike won the stage, with Jonas Vingegaard attacking the final climb to take the yellow jersey in the GC. Netcompany INEOS was second fastest, 8 seconds behind, despite Kévin Vauquelin having a puncture. UAE Team Emirates XRG was third, 12 seconds behind Visma–Lease a Bike. The second stage remained in Spain, finishing with three laps of a hilly circuit on the Montjuïc hill above Barcelona. On the circuit, the peloton gradually reduced in size due to a fast pace set by UAE Team Emirates XRG. In the uphill sprint to the finish, Tadej Pogačar (UAE Team Emirates XRG) ensured that his teammate Isaac del Toro took the stage victory. Remco Evenepoel (Red Bull–Bora–Hansgrohe) finished third ahead of Vingegaard, whose lead in the GC was cut to 6 seconds.

Stage 3 took riders northwards into France and the Pyrenees, with spectators discouraged from attending the race owing to wildfires in the region. Pogačar attacked on the final climb into Les Angles, crossing the line 2 seconds ahead of Vingegaard to take the yellow jersey. Stage 4 to Foix was held in temperatures of around 40 °C (104 °F). Mads Pedersen (Lidl–Trek) won the stage in a sprint finish from a large breakaway, which gave breakaway member Torstein Træen (Uno-X Mobility) the yellow jersey. Pogačar predicted that Træen would hold the jersey for several stages, given the nearly 8 minute margin between him and other GC contenders. Stage 5 to Pau was won by Olav Kooij (Decathlon CMA CGM) in a sprint finish ahead of Max Kanter (XDS Astana Team) and Tim Merlier (Soudal–Quick-Step), with Pedersen finishing 7th to extend his lead in the points classification.

Stage 6 was the first high mountain stage of the Tour, with five climbs in the Pyrenees, including the hors catégorie climb of Col du Tourmalet (17.1 km at an average gradient of 7.3%, with the summit at an elevation of 2,115 m (6,939 ft)). On the Tourmalet, UAE Team Emirates XRG set a fast pace, with Træen in the yellow jersey falling behind the main group with 11 km (6.8 mi) to go. With 5 km (3.1 mi) to the summit, del Toro attacked with Pogačar following. Vingegaard immediately began a solo chase, as the pace was too fast for Evenepoel, Paul Seixas (Decathlon CMA CGM), and Florian Lipowitz (Red Bull–Bora–Hansgrohe) to maintain. Pogačar made a solo breakaway with 43 km (27 mi) remaining, reaching the Tourmalet summit alone. Pogačar descended at pace, and pushed on to the uphill finish at Gavarnie-Gèdre. He won the stage by 2 minutes 38 seconds, ahead of a solo chase by Vingegaard. Other GC contenders including del Toro, Evenepoel, Seixas and Lipowitz finished a further 45 seconds behind. Pogačar took the yellow jersey of the GC, with a lead of 2 minutes 42 seconds over Vingegaard, with del Toro (the new leader of the young rider classification) a further 45 seconds behind. Træen crashed on the descent from the Tourmalet, but continued after receiving medical attention; he finished around 30 minutes behind Pogačar. After the finish, Uno-X Mobility stated that Træen had a "concussion and multiple rib fractures" and was dropping out of the race.

The next two stages to Bordeaux and Bergerac were won in sprint finishes by Merlier, with Pedersen maintaining his lead in the points classification. Stage 9 in the Massif Central was shortened due to a red warning of an ongoing heatwave in the Corrèze department. It was won by Mathieu van der Poel (Alpecin–Premier Tech) from a breakaway.

=== Week two in the Massif Central, Vosges and Alps ===
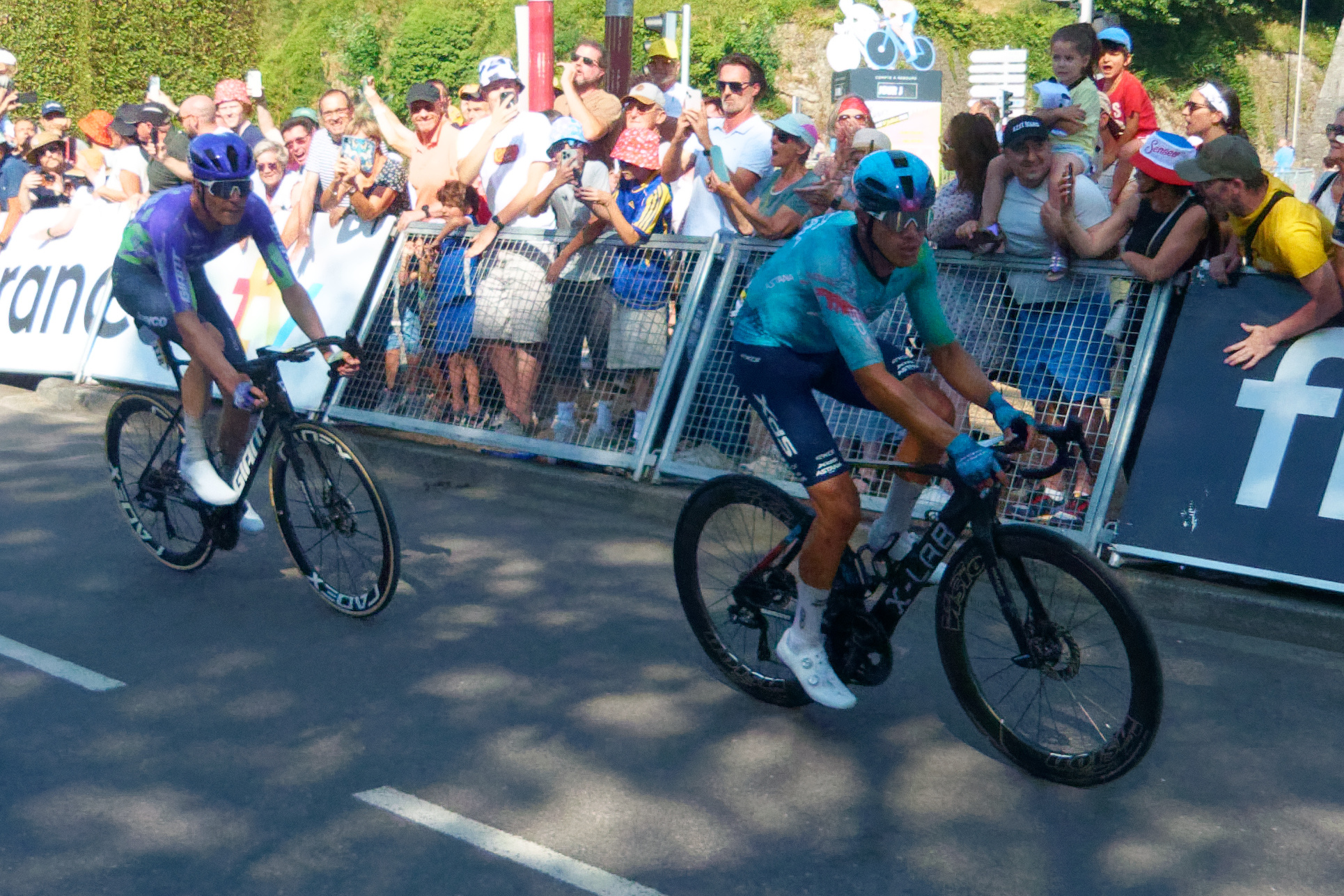
Mauro Schmid and Harold Tejada approaching the finish line in Belfort on stage 13

After a rest day, the race continued in the Massif Central on Bastille Day. Pogačar attacked from the peloton on the first-category climb of Col du Pertus (4.4 km at an average gradient of 8.5%) with around 15 km (9.3 mi) to the finish line. Overtaking Richard Carapaz (EF Education–EasyPost) prior to the summit, Pogačar rode to the finish line at Le Lioran to win his third stage of the Tour, extending his lead in the GC to over 3½ minutes. In the GC group behind, Evenepoel sprinted towards the line, finishing 32 seconds behind Pogačar and gaining a handful of seconds that moved him into third overall, ahead of Juan Ayuso (Lidl–Trek) who took the white jersey of the young rider classification.

The next two stages to Nevers and Chalon-sur-Saône were won by sprinters. Søren Wærenskjold (Uno-X Mobility) won stage 11, which he completed in the fastest average speed in the history of the Tour, 50.9 kilometres per hour (31.6 mph). Merlier won stage 12, with a large crash occurring behind him. Pedersen extended his lead in the green jersey of the points classification.

Heading into the Vosges mountains, stage 13 was won by Mauro Schmid (Team Jayco–AlUla) from a breakaway. Tom Pidcock (Pinarello–Q36.5 Pro Cycling Team) was also in the breakaway, advancing him to fourth overall in the GC. Stage 14 remained in the Vosges, with Pogačar attacking from the group of GC contenders with around 7 km (4.3 mi) remaining. Vingegaard and Seixas worked together to minimise the gap to Pogačar – eventually finishing around 40 seconds behind. Pogačar's GC lead increased to 4½ minutes, with Vingegaard in second place and Evenepoel in third. The other GC contenders – Seixas, Ayuso, Lipowitz and del Toro – were all within 30 seconds of each other.

Prior to the start of stage 15, the International Testing Agency woke Vingegaard around 2am and Pogačar around 5am, to administer drugs tests on them. These tests took place outside of normal testing hours, and had been authorised by a Paris prosecutor. Reacting to the tests, Vingegaard stated that "It's good that they test, but when it's affecting performance and your sleep, I don't think it's so good." Evenepoel criticised the tests, stating that it was disrespectful and "something we [...] should not accept as athletes". Pogačar later remarked that Vingegaard's 2am drug test would have "ruined his deep sleep and then completely ruined the night", but "if this is necessary to still prove that we are riding clean, then I totally accept it".

Stage 15 took the race into the Savoyard Alps, with a finish at Plateau de Solaison. With about 24 km (15 mi) remaining in the stage, Vingeegaard crashed after hitting the kerb while exiting a roundabout. He broke his collarbone and dropped out of the race. Merlier also dropped out during this stage, due to the challenging terrain. On the climb to the finish at Plateau de Solaison, Pogačar led from Del Toro and Evenepoel, as Seixas and Lipowitz lost time behind. In a sprint to the finish, Evenepoel finished ahead of Pogačar, winning his first mountain stage at the Tour. Pogačar speculated that Vingegaard's crash might have been due to lack of sleep following the drugs test.

=== Week three in the Alps ===
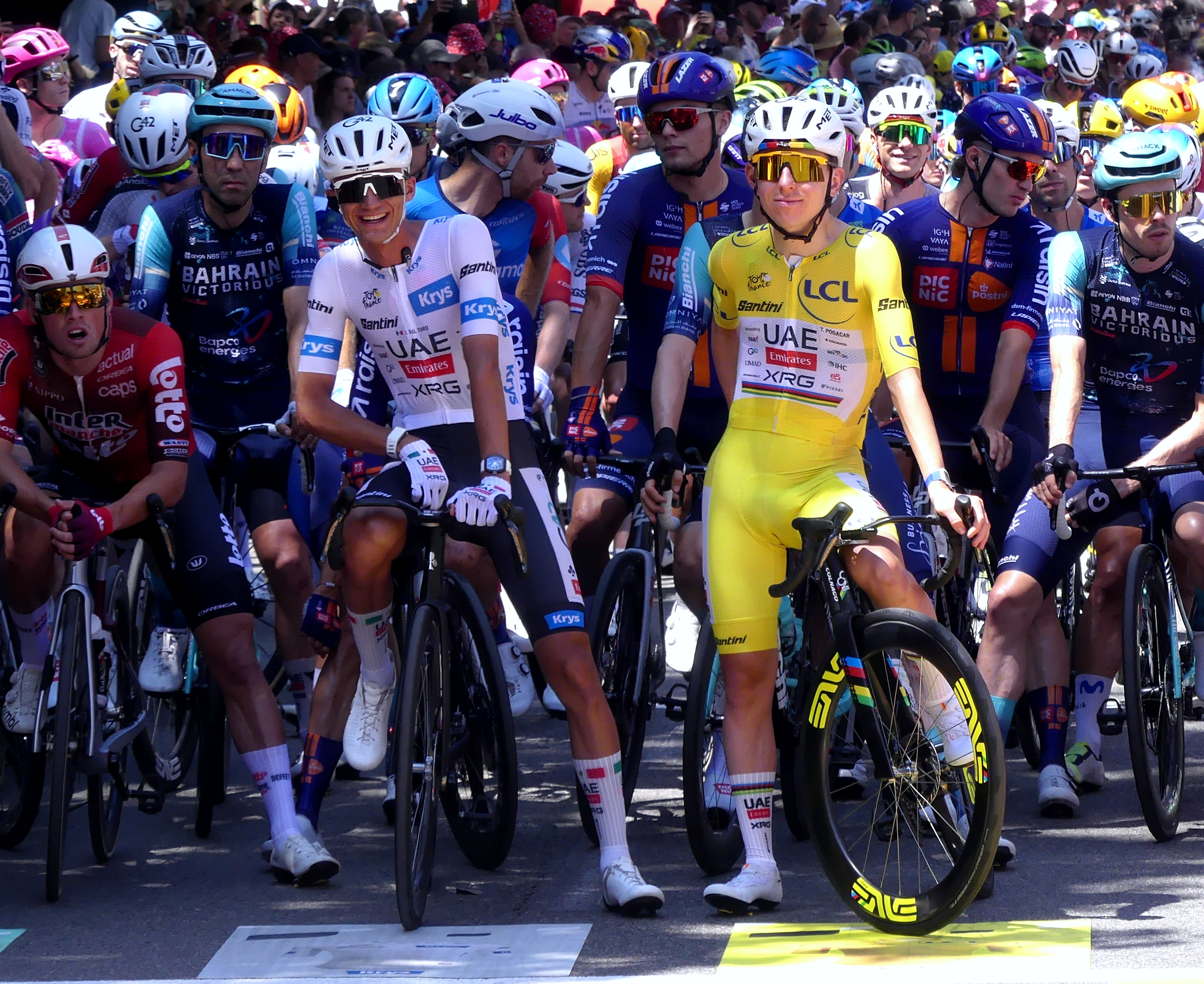
UAE Team Emirates XRG teammates Isaac del Toro (in the white jersey) and Tadej Pogačar (in the yellow jersey) prior to the start of stage 17 in Chambéry

After the second rest day, the third week of the race began with a 26.1 km (16.2 mi) individual time trial to Thonon-les-Bains. Evenepoel set the fastest time, winning a Tour time trial stage for the third time in his career. Pogačar was second, 28 seconds slower, which reduced his GC lead to 4½ minutes. Third on the stage was Mattias Skjelmose (Lidl–Trek), over a minute slower than Evenepoel. Seixas was faster than del Toro, cutting the gap between them for third in the GC to around 20 seconds. Lipowitz crashed on the descent, breaking his collarbone, causing him to drop out of the race. Ayuso therefore moved into fifth in the GC.

Stage 17 to Voiron was the last flat stage before three mountain stages in the Alps. Pedersen caught up with a large breakaway, then won the intermediate sprint at 28 km (17 mi). Multiple attacks ensued, with a reduced group of sprinters approaching the finish. In the sprint finish, Philipsen used van der Poel to propel him to the stage victory, with Pedersen finishing in eighth place. Pedersen's lead in the points classification was cut to seven points, with few points still available before the Tour reached Paris.

Stage 18 gradually climbed to a summit finish at Orcières-Merlette at an elevation of 1,825 m (5,988 ft). A large breakaway contained strong climbers and Pedersen, who took maximum points at the intermediate sprint, extending his lead to thirty-two points. On the climbs, the breakaway group slowly eroded as Valentin Paret-Peintre (Soudal–Quick-Step) tried to gain points in the mountains classification. In the final climb, Carapaz broke away from the remaining four riders with 3.5 km (2.2 mi) to go, then took the stage win and the lead in the mountains classification. All the remaining GC contenders finished close together. UAE Team Emirates XRG were suffering from illness, which caused Pogačar's teammate Brandon McNulty to drop out of the race.

Stage 19 to Alpe d'Huez was won by Pogačar, who attacked with 12 km (7.5 mi) to go on the climb. He finished in a record time for the Alpe d'Huez, beating Marco Pantani's time set in 1995.

Stage 20 was the final mountain stage of the race and predicted to be the queen stage. It contained four climbs, three of them hors catégorie. Sepp Kuss (Visma–Lease a Bike) was leading the stage after a breakaway, but he crashed twice in the final 8 km (5.0 mi). Carapaz inherited the lead and won the stage, extending his lead in the mountains classification. Pogačar rode as a domestique for del Toro, helping the latter to secure third place in the GC and the lead in the young rider classification. Pedersen gained more points at the intermediate sprint, giving him an unassailable lead in the points classification.

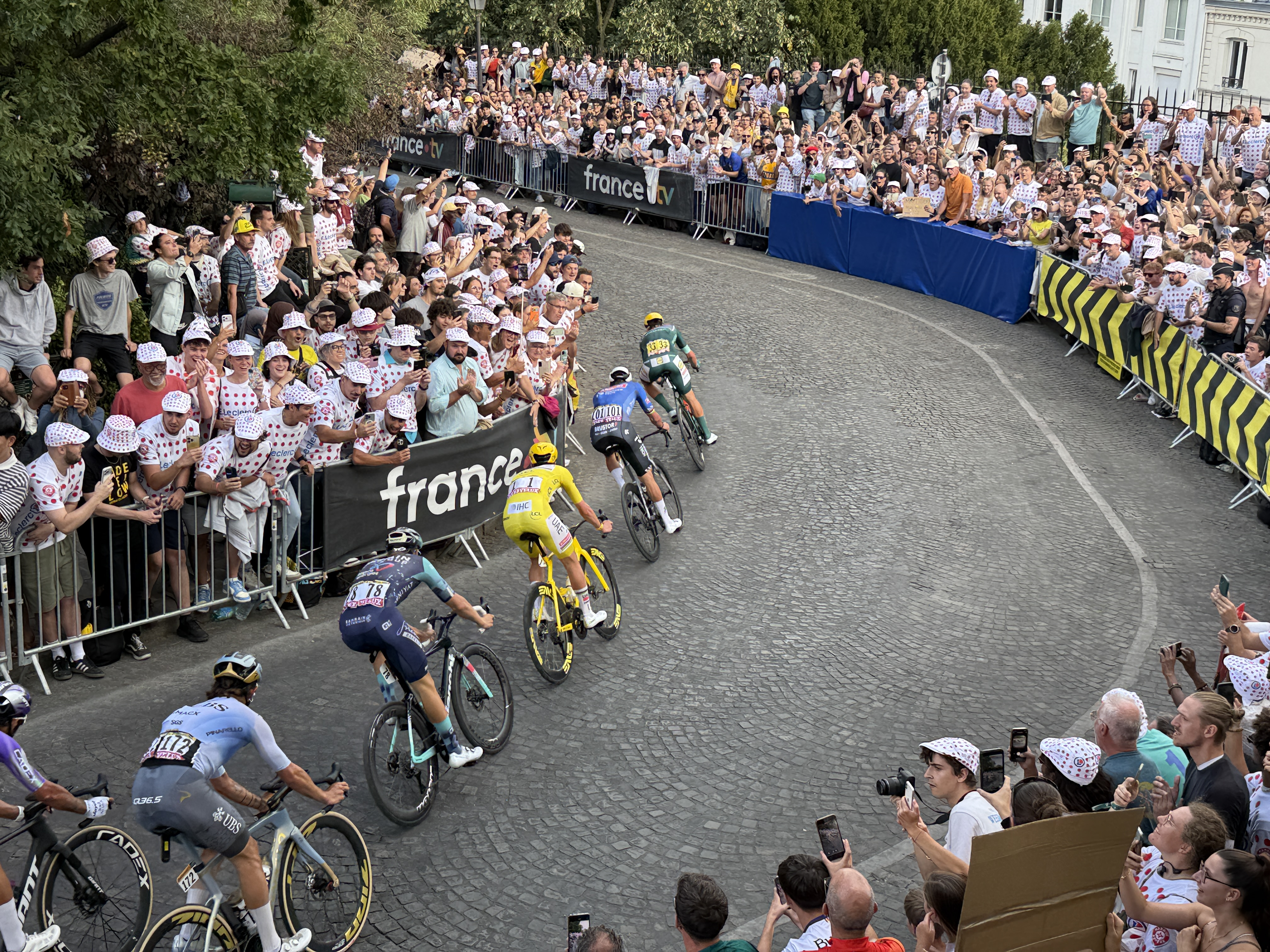
Mads Pedersen, Tadej Pogačar and eventual stage winner Mathieu van der Poel on the Montmartre climb on stage 21

The final stage of the race was in Paris, with the traditional final stage to the Champs-Élysées. The stage used the Montmartre circuit, previously used at the Paris 2024 Summer Olympics and the 2025 Tour de France, modified to provide 11 km (6.8 mi) between the final ascent of Montmartre to the finish line on the Champs-Élysées. It was therefore predicted that sprinters would have a greater chance of contending for the stage win. The stage was shortened by 43.8 km (27.2 mi) due to redeployment of security staff to tackle ongoing wildfires in Gironde. The GC was neutralized after the first Montmartre circuit, ensuring that crashes or other incidents would not impact the final GC standings.

Pogačar attacked on the Montmartre climbs, attempting a breakaway with Evenepoel, van der Poel and Pedersen with one lap to go, but the group was caught by the peloton. On the final lap, Pogačar and van der Poel attacked again on the climb, but could only build a lead of 10 seconds ahead of the chasing peloton of sprinters. The pair worked together to maintain the gap on the descent and race to the line. The gap had narrowed to 5 seconds as they passed the flamme rouge with 1 km (0.62 mi) to go. On the final straight of the Champs-Élysées, Pogačar was overtaken by van der Poel in a final push for the line. Alpecin–Premier Tech led out Philipsen and Lidl–Trek led out Pedersen, however van der Poel hung on to win the stage in a photo finish, ahead of Philipsen and Pedersen. Pogačar finished in the chasing bunch of sprinters, sealing his fifth Tour victory. Carapaz, Pedersen and del Toro also finished the stage safely, winning their categories.

=== Results ===
In the general classification, Pogačar won the Tour for the fifth time. Only Pogačar, Jacques Anquetil, Eddy Merckx, Bernard Hinault and Miguel Induráin have five Tour victories. Pogačar's average speed of 43.227 kilometres per hour (26.860 mph) over the three weeks of racing was the fastest in the history of the Tour. Evenepoel finished in second place, 6 minutes 26 seconds behind. Del Toro was third, 9 minutes 42 seconds behind Pogačar.

The points classification was won by Pedersen with 559 points, ahead of Philipsen and Girmay. Carapaz won the mountains classification, ahead of Pogačar and Paret-Peintre. Carapaz also won the award for the most combative rider. The young rider classification was won by del Toro. The teams classification was won by Lidl–Trek.

Of the 184 riders who started the race, 158 reached the finish in Paris. Cees Bol was the lanterne rouge in last place overall on GC, with an overall time around 6 hours and 20 minutes behind Pogačar.

For the third time overall and for the first time since 1999, French riders recorded no stage victories.

== Classification leadership ==
Classification leadership by stage
Stage	Winner	General classification	Points classification	Mountains classification	Young rider classification	Team classification	Combativity award
1	Visma–Lease a Bike	Jonas Vingegaard	Egan Bernal (Note: Although there were no points awarded towards the points or mountains classification during the team time trial, the first green jersey was awarded to the fastest rider over its first 5.1 kilometres (3.2 miles), and the first polka dot jersey was awarded to the fastest rider over its final 3.7 kilometres (2.3 miles).)	Tadej Pogačar	Juan Ayuso	Netcompany INEOS (Note: Although Visma–Lease a Bike won the team time trial, the first teams classification standings were based on each team's fastest three riders.)	no award
2	Isaac del Toro	Jonas Vingegaard	Isaac del Toro	Alex Molenaar	Isaac del Toro (Note: On stage 3, Juan Ayuso, who was second in the young rider classification, wore the white jersey, because first placed Isaac del Toro wore the green jersey as the leader of the points classification.)	UAE Team Emirates XRG	Felix Engelhardt
3	Tadej Pogačar	Tadej Pogačar	Tadej Pogačar (Note: On stage 4, Jonas Vingegaard, who was second in the points classification, wore the green jersey, because first placed Tadej Pogačar wore the yellow jersey as the leader of the general classification.)	Alex Baudin	Isaac del Toro	UAE Team Emirates XRG	Alex Baudin
4	Mads Pedersen	Torstein Træen	Mads Pedersen	Alex Baudin	Mathias Vacek	Lidl–Trek	Pablo Castrillo
5	Olav Kooij	Torstein Træen	Mads Pedersen	Alex Baudin	Mathias Vacek	Lidl–Trek	Baptiste Veistroffer
6	Tadej Pogačar	Tadej Pogačar	Mads Pedersen	Tadej Pogačar (Note: On stages 7–14, Jonas Vingegaard, who was second in the mountain classification, wore the polka jersey, because first placed Tadej Pogačar wore the yellow jersey as the leader of the general classification.) (Note: On stages 15–19, Valentin Paret-Peintre, who was second in the mountain classification, wore the polka jersey, because first placed Tadej Pogačar wore the yellow jersey as the leader of the general classification.)	Isaac del Toro	Lidl–Trek	Tadej Pogačar
7	Tim Merlier	Tadej Pogačar	Mads Pedersen	Tadej Pogačar	Isaac del Toro	Lidl–Trek	Baptiste Veistroffer
8	Tim Merlier	Tadej Pogačar	Mads Pedersen	Tadej Pogačar	Isaac del Toro	Lidl–Trek	Liam Slock
9	Mathieu van der Poel	Tadej Pogačar	Mads Pedersen	Tadej Pogačar	Isaac del Toro	Lidl–Trek	Mathieu van der Poel
10	Tadej Pogačar	Tadej Pogačar	Mads Pedersen	Tadej Pogačar	Juan Ayuso	Lidl–Trek	Richard Carapaz
11	Søren Wærenskjold	Tadej Pogačar	Mads Pedersen	Tadej Pogačar	Juan Ayuso	Lidl–Trek	Anthon Charmig
12	Tim Merlier	Tadej Pogačar	Mads Pedersen	Tadej Pogačar	Juan Ayuso	Lidl–Trek	Baptiste Veistroffer
13	Mauro Schmid	Tadej Pogačar	Mads Pedersen	Tadej Pogačar	Juan Ayuso	Lidl–Trek	Tom Pidcock
14	Tadej Pogačar	Tadej Pogačar	Mads Pedersen	Tadej Pogačar	Paul Seixas	Lidl–Trek	Richard Carapaz
15	Remco Evenepoel	Tadej Pogačar	Mads Pedersen	Tadej Pogačar	Isaac del Toro	Lidl–Trek	Quinn Simmons
16	Remco Evenepoel	Tadej Pogačar	Mads Pedersen	Tadej Pogačar	Isaac del Toro	Lidl–Trek	no award
17	Jasper Philipsen	Tadej Pogačar	Mads Pedersen	Tadej Pogačar	Isaac del Toro	Lidl–Trek	Mads Pedersen
18	Richard Carapaz	Tadej Pogačar	Mads Pedersen	Tadej Pogačar	Isaac del Toro	Lidl–Trek	Richard Carapaz
19	Tadej Pogačar	Tadej Pogačar	Mads Pedersen	Richard Carapaz	Isaac del Toro	Lidl–Trek	Richard Carapaz
20	Richard Carapaz	Tadej Pogačar	Mads Pedersen	Richard Carapaz	Isaac del Toro	Lidl–Trek	Sepp Kuss
21	Mathieu van der Poel	Tadej Pogačar	Mads Pedersen	Richard Carapaz	Isaac del Toro	Lidl–Trek	no award
Final		Tadej Pogačar	Mads Pedersen	Richard Carapaz	Isaac del Toro	Lidl–Trek	Richard Carapaz

== Classification standings ==
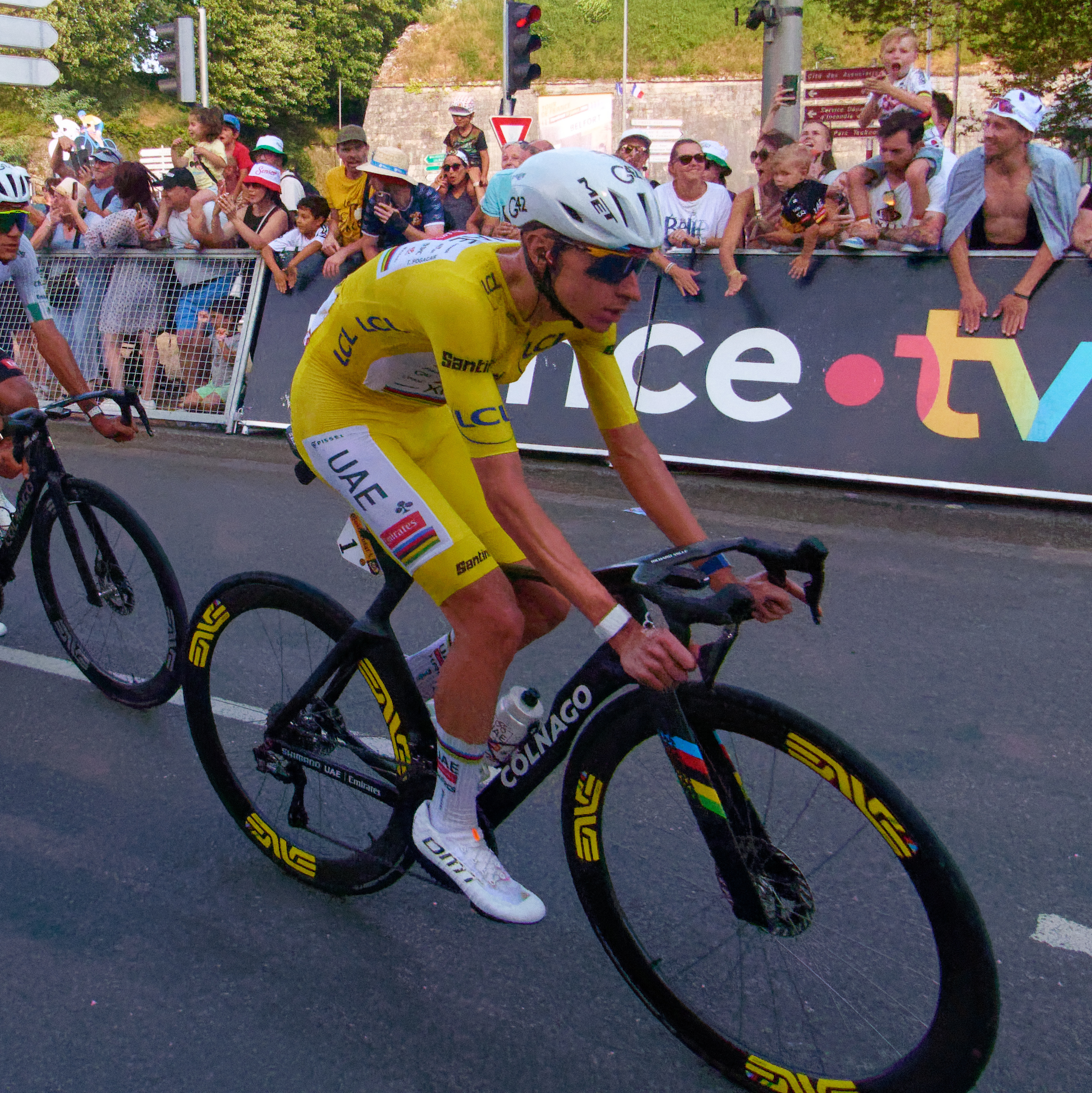
Tadej Pogačar, winner of the general classification wearing the yellow jersey

Legend
Denotes the winner of the general classification	Denotes the winner of the mountains classification
Denotes the winner of the points classification	Denotes the winner of the young rider classification
Denotes the winner of the team classification	Denotes the winner of the combativity award

=== General classification ===
Final general classification (1–10)
Rank	Rider	Team	Time
1	Tadej Pogačar (SLO)	UAE Team Emirates XRG	73h 56' 26"
2	Remco Evenepoel (BEL)	Red Bull–Bora–Hansgrohe	+ 6' 26"
3	Isaac del Toro (MEX)	UAE Team Emirates XRG	+ 9' 42"
4	Paul Seixas (FRA)	Decathlon CMA CGM	+ 11' 56"
5	Lenny Martinez (FRA)	Team Bahrain Victorious	+ 13' 02"
6	Mattias Skjelmose (DEN)	Lidl–Trek	+ 14' 59"
7	Juan Ayuso (ESP)	Lidl–Trek	+ 17' 48"
8	Richard Carapaz (ECU)	EF Education–EasyPost	+ 20' 00"
9	Tom Pidcock (GBR)	Pinarello–Q36.5 Pro Cycling Team	+ 29' 28"
10	Jordan Jegat (FRA)	Team TotalEnergies	+ 33' 21"

Final general classification (11–158)
Rank	Rider	Team	Time
11	Yannis Voisard (SUI)	Tudor Pro Cycling Team	+ 38' 02"
12	Tobias Halland Johannessen (NOR)	Uno-X Mobility	+ 56' 37"
13	Sepp Kuss (USA)	Visma–Lease a Bike	+ 1h 02' 23"
14	Davide Piganzoli (ITA)	Visma–Lease a Bike	+ 1h 03' 43"
15	Jai Hindley (AUS)	Red Bull–Bora–Hansgrohe	+ 1h 23' 28"
16	Nicolas Prodhomme (FRA)	Decathlon CMA CGM	+ 1h 25' 01"
17	Tiesj Benoot (BEL)	Decathlon CMA CGM	+ 1h 32' 56"
18	Quinn Simmons (USA)	Lidl–Trek	+ 1h 35' 28"
19	Sean Quinn (USA)	EF Education–EasyPost	+ 1h 47' 05"
20	Egan Bernal (COL)	Netcompany INEOS	+ 1h 47' 58"
21	Adam Yates (GBR)	UAE Team Emirates XRG	+ 1h 51' 59"
22	Thymen Arensman (NED)	Netcompany INEOS	+ 2h 02' 42"
23	Carlos Verona (ESP)	Lidl–Trek	+ 2h 05' 22"
24	Matthew Riccitello (USA)	Decathlon CMA CGM	+ 2h 11' 09"
25	Derek Gee-West (CAN)	Lidl–Trek	+ 2h 12' 59"
26	Harold Tejada (COL)	XDS Astana Team	+ 2h 19' 47"
27	Maxim Van Gils (BEL)	Red Bull–Bora–Hansgrohe	+ 2h 24' 09"
28	Ben O'Connor (AUS)	Team Jayco–AlUla	+ 2h 31' 38"
29	Pablo Castrillo (ESP)	Movistar Team	+ 2h 31' 43"
30	Matteo Jorgenson (USA)	Visma–Lease a Bike	+ 2h 33' 29"
31	Guillaume Martin (FRA)	Groupama–FDJ United	+ 2h 34' 15"
32	Felix Großschartner (AUT)	UAE Team Emirates XRG	+ 2h 43' 22"
33	Mattia Cattaneo (ITA)	Red Bull–Bora–Hansgrohe	+ 2h 51' 19"
34	Raúl García Pierna (ESP)	Movistar Team	+ 2h 52' 32"
35	Mauro Schmid (SUI)	Team Jayco–AlUla	+ 2h 53' 29"
36	Kévin Vauquelin (FRA)	Netcompany INEOS	+ 3h 01' 17"
37	Antonio Tiberi (ITA)	Team Bahrain Victorious	+ 3h 03' 52"
38	Sergio Higuita (COL)	XDS Astana Team	+ 3h 04' 35"
39	Quinten Hermans (BEL)	Pinarello–Q36.5 Pro Cycling Team	+ 3h 05' 23"
40	Clément Braz Afonso (FRA)	Groupama–FDJ United	+ 3h 06' 23"
41	Lennert Van Eetvelt (BEL)	Lotto–Intermarché	+ 3h 08' 22"
42	Aurélien Paret-Peintre (FRA)	Decathlon CMA CGM	+ 3h 08' 28"
43	Tobias Foss (NOR)	Netcompany INEOS	+ 3h 08' 29"
44	Valentin Paret-Peintre (FRA)	Soudal–Quick-Step	+ 3h 09' 21"
45	Ion Izagirre (ESP)	Cofidis	+ 3h 10' 13"
46	Alex Baudin (FRA)	EF Education–EasyPost	+ 3h 11' 41"
47	Abel Balderstone (ESP)	Caja Rural–Seguros RGA	+ 3h 24' 26"
48	Marc Hirschi (SUI)	Tudor Pro Cycling Team	+ 3h 29' 59"
49	Mathias Vacek (CZE)	Lidl–Trek	+ 3h 34' 36"
50	Nicolas Breuillard (FRA)	Team TotalEnergies	+ 3h 34' 36"
51	Joris Delbove (FRA)	Team TotalEnergies	+ 3h 37' 06"
52	Michael Matthews (AUS)	Team Jayco–AlUla	+ 3h 37' 35"
53	Michael Valgren (DEN)	EF Education–EasyPost	+ 3h 39' 09"
54	Javier Romo (ESP)	Movistar Team	+ 3h 41' 49"
55	Damiano Caruso (ITA)	Team Bahrain Victorious	+ 3h 46' 43"
56	Xandro Meurisse (BEL)	Pinarello–Q36.5 Pro Cycling Team	+ 3h 49' 13"
57	Romain Grégoire (FRA)	Groupama–FDJ United	+ 3h 50' 00"
58	Quentin Pacher (FRA)	Groupama–FDJ United	+ 3h 50' 29"
59	Ben Healy (IRL)	EF Education–EasyPost	+ 3h 51' 03"
60	Anders Skaarseth (NOR)	Uno-X Mobility	+ 4h 03' 07"
61	Alexandre Delettre (FRA)	Team TotalEnergies	+ 4h 03' 16"
62	Bruno Armirail (FRA)	Visma–Lease a Bike	+ 4h 03' 26"
63	Michael Storer (AUS)	Tudor Pro Cycling Team	+ 4h 11' 37"
64	Anders Halland Johannessen (NOR)	Uno-X Mobility	+ 4h 14' 42"
65	Nelson Oliveira (POR)	Movistar Team	+ 4h 17' 56"
66	Vlad Van Mechelen (BEL)	Team Bahrain Victorious	+ 4h 18' 07"
67	Louis Vervaeke (BEL)	Soudal–Quick-Step	+ 4h 18' 38"
68	George Bennett (NZL)	NSN Cycling Team	+ 4h 18' 42"
69	Clément Russo (FRA)	Groupama–FDJ United	+ 4h 20' 25"
70	Felix Engelhardt (GER)	Team Jayco–AlUla	+ 4h 22' 31"
71	Jasper Stuyven (BEL)	Soudal–Quick-Step	+ 4h 22' 49"
72	Nils Politt (GER)	UAE Team Emirates XRG	+ 4h 23' 30"
73	Rick Pluimers (NED)	Tudor Pro Cycling Team	+ 4h 24' 31"
74	Tim Wellens (BEL)	UAE Team Emirates XRG	+ 4h 25' 28"
75	Mathieu van der Poel (NED)	Alpecin–Premier Tech	+ 4h 26' 28"
76	Mathis Le Berre (FRA)	Team TotalEnergies	+ 4h 26' 49"
77	Jonas Abrahamsen (NOR)	Uno-X Mobility	+ 4h 30' 23"
78	Marco Frigo (ITA)	NSN Cycling Team	+ 4h 32' 04"
79	Ewen Costiou (FRA)	Groupama–FDJ United	+ 4h 32' 23"
80	Mads Pedersen (DEN)	Lidl–Trek	+ 4h 33' 05"
81	Brent Van Moer (BEL)	Pinarello–Q36.5 Pro Cycling Team	+ 4h 33' 14"
82	Victor Campenaerts (BEL)	Visma–Lease a Bike	+ 4h 34' 17"
83	Jan Tratnik (SLO)	Red Bull–Bora–Hansgrohe	+ 4h 34' 24"
84	Kasper Asgreen (DEN)	EF Education–EasyPost	+ 4h 35' 37"
85	Alex Aranburu (ESP)	Cofidis	+ 4h 37' 55"
86	Mattéo Vercher (FRA)	Team TotalEnergies	+ 4h 38' 44"
87	Warren Barguil (FRA)	Team Picnic–PostNL	+ 4h 40' 03"
88	Damien Howson (AUS)	Pinarello–Q36.5 Pro Cycling Team	+ 4h 41' 38"
89	Sebastian Berwick (AUS)	Caja Rural–Seguros RGA	+ 4h 44' 04"
90	Georg Zimmermann (GER)	Lotto–Intermarché	+ 4h 44' 21"
91	Luke Plapp (AUS)	Team Jayco–AlUla	+ 4h 44' 30"
92	Matej Mohorič (SLO)	Team Bahrain Victorious	+ 4h 44' 30"
93	Lorenzo Germani (ITA)	Groupama–FDJ United	+ 4h 48' 18"
94	Toms Skujiņš (LAT)	Lidl–Trek	+ 4h 49' 39"
95	Nico Denz (GER)	Red Bull–Bora–Hansgrohe	+ 4h 52' 16"
96	Emiel Verstrynge (BEL)	Alpecin–Premier Tech	+ 4h 57' 11"
97	Magnus Cort (DEN)	Uno-X Mobility	+ 4h 57' 57"
98	Nicolas Vinokurov (KAZ)	XDS Astana Team	+ 5h 01' 12"
99	Xabier Azparren (ESP)	Pinarello–Q36.5 Pro Cycling Team	+ 5h 02' 54"
100	Simone Velasco (ITA)	XDS Astana Team	+ 5h 04' 15"
101	Jefferson Alveiro Cepeda (ECU)	Movistar Team	+ 5h 04' 42"
102	Frank van den Broek (NED)	Team Picnic–PostNL	+ 5h 07' 36"
103	Per Strand Hagenes (NOR)	Visma–Lease a Bike	+ 5h 07' 45"
104	Michel Hessmann (GER)	Movistar Team	+ 5h 11' 28"
105	Robert Stannard (AUS)	Team Bahrain Victorious	+ 5h 13' 12"
106	Max Walker (GBR)	EF Education–EasyPost	+ 5h 13' 19"
107	Luke Durbridge (AUS)	Team Jayco–AlUla	+ 5h 13' 26"
108	Anthony Turgis (FRA)	Team TotalEnergies	+ 5h 14' 55"
109	Thibault Guernalec (FRA)	Team TotalEnergies	+ 5h 15' 27"
110	Michał Kwiatkowski (POL)	Netcompany INEOS	+ 5h 15' 39"
111	Tim van Dijke (NED)	Red Bull–Bora–Hansgrohe	+ 5h 16' 43"
112	Jakub Otruba (CZE)	Caja Rural–Seguros RGA	+ 5h 17' 23"
113	Georg Steinhauser (GER)	EF Education–EasyPost	+ 5h 19' 39"
114	Edward Planckaert (BEL)	Alpecin–Premier Tech	+ 5h 24' 18"
115	Jonas Rickaert (BEL)	Alpecin–Premier Tech	+ 5h 24' 39"
116	Florian Vermeersch (BEL)	UAE Team Emirates XRG	+ 5h 26' 49"
117	Benjamin Thomas (FRA)	Cofidis	+ 5h 27' 05"
118	Robbe Dhondt (BEL)	Team Picnic–PostNL	+ 5h 27' 16"
119	Hugo Page (FRA)	Cofidis	+ 5h 27' 56"
120	Josh Tarling (GBR)	Netcompany INEOS	+ 5h 28' 28"
121	Aaron Gate (NZL)	XDS Astana Team	+ 5h 28' 56"
122	Alex Kirsch (LUX)	Cofidis	+ 5h 30' 05"
123	Filippo Ganna (ITA)	Netcompany INEOS	+ 5h 31' 00"
124	Mike Teunissen (NED)	XDS Astana Team	+ 5h 31' 58"
125	Julian Alaphilippe (FRA)	Tudor Pro Cycling Team	+ 5h 33' 07"
126	Stefano Oldani (ITA)	Caja Rural–Seguros RGA	+ 5h 33' 34"
127	Fred Wright (GBR)	Pinarello–Q36.5 Pro Cycling Team	+ 5h 36' 21"
128	Liam Slock (BEL)	Lotto–Intermarché	+ 5h 36' 40"
129	Joel Nicolau (ESP)	Caja Rural–Seguros RGA	+ 5h 37' 07"
130	Daan Hoole (NED)	Decathlon CMA CGM	+ 5h 38' 04"
131	Dylan van Baarle (NED)	Soudal–Quick-Step	+ 5h 38' 53"
132	Huub Artz (NED)	Lotto–Intermarché	+ 5h 42' 34"
133	Tim Marsman (NED)	Alpecin–Premier Tech	+ 5h 43' 11"
134	Krists Neilands (LAT)	NSN Cycling Team	+ 5h 43' 58"
135	Jasper Philipsen (BEL)	Alpecin–Premier Tech	+ 5h 44' 35"
136	Dorian Godon (FRA)	Netcompany INEOS	+ 5h 46' 54"
137	Silvan Dillier (SUI)	Alpecin–Premier Tech	+ 5h 48' 36"
138	Søren Wærenskjold (NOR)	Uno-X Mobility	+ 5h 48' 38"
139	Niklas Märkl (GER)	Team Picnic–PostNL	+ 5h 51' 31"
140	Pavel Bittner (CZE)	Team Picnic–PostNL	+ 5h 51' 51"
141	Biniam Girmay (ERI)	NSN Cycling Team	+ 5h 54' 20"
142	Max Kanter (GER)	XDS Astana Team	+ 5h 55' 29"
143	Pascal Eenkhoorn (NED)	Soudal–Quick-Step	+ 5h 57' 18"
144	Jenthe Biermans (BEL)	Cofidis	+ 6h 01' 44"
145	John Degenkolb (GER)	Team Picnic–PostNL	+ 6h 01' 44"
146	Baptiste Veistroffer (FRA)	Lotto–Intermarché	+ 6h 02' 14"
147	Marco Haller (AUT)	Tudor Pro Cycling Team	+ 6h 02' 20"
148	Milan Fretin (BEL)	Cofidis	+ 6h 06' 10"
149	Olav Kooij (NED)	Decathlon CMA CGM	+ 6h 09' 18"
150	Jake Stewart (GBR)	NSN Cycling Team	+ 6h 10' 47"
151	Lewis Askey (GBR)	NSN Cycling Team	+ 6h 10' 48"
152	Davide Ballerini (ITA)	XDS Astana Team	+ 6h 11' 22"
153	Piet Allegaert (BEL)	Cofidis	+ 6h 12' 22"
154	Phil Bauhaus (GER)	Team Bahrain Victorious	+ 6h 13' 49"
155	Kamil Gradek (POL)	Team Bahrain Victorious	+ 6h 16' 12"
156	Julius van den Berg (NED)	Team Picnic–PostNL	+ 6h 17' 26"
157	Matis Louvel (FRA)	NSN Cycling Team	+ 6h 17' 36"
158	Cees Bol (NED)	Decathlon CMA CGM	+ 6h 22' 08"

=== Points classification ===
Final points classification (1–10)
Rank	Rider	Team	Points
1	Mads Pedersen (DEN)	Lidl–Trek	559
2	Jasper Philipsen (BEL)	Alpecin–Premier Tech	475
3	Biniam Girmay (ERI)	NSN Cycling Team	367
4	Max Kanter (GER)	XDS Astana Team	289
5	Olav Kooij (NED)	Decathlon CMA CGM	246
6	Tadej Pogačar (SLO)	UAE Team Emirates XRG	198
7	Søren Wærenskjold (NOR)	Uno-X Mobility	159
8	Remco Evenepoel (BEL)	Red Bull–Bora–Hansgrohe	157
9	Isaac del Toro (MEX)	UAE Team Emirates XRG	143
10	Anthony Turgis (FRA)	Team TotalEnergies	139

=== Mountains classification ===
Final mountains classification (1–10)
Rank	Rider	Team	Points
1	Richard Carapaz (ECU)	EF Education–EasyPost	156
2	Tadej Pogačar (SLO)	UAE Team Emirates XRG	100
3	Valentin Paret-Peintre (FRA)	Soudal–Quick-Step	99
4	Sepp Kuss (USA)	Visma–Lease a Bike	55
5	Remco Evenepoel (BEL)	Red Bull–Bora–Hansgrohe	50
6	Lenny Martinez (FRA)	Team Bahrain Victorious	41
7	Isaac del Toro (MEX)	UAE Team Emirates XRG	40
8	Paul Seixas (FRA)	Decathlon CMA CGM	36
9	Tobias Halland Johannessen (NOR)	Uno-X Mobility	29
10	Jai Hindley (AUS)	Red Bull–Bora–Hansgrohe	28

=== Young rider classification ===
Final young rider classification (1–10)
Rank	Rider	Team	Time
1	Isaac del Toro (MEX)	UAE Team Emirates XRG	74h 06' 08"
2	Paul Seixas (FRA)	Decathlon CMA CGM	+ 2' 14"
3	Lenny Martinez (FRA)	Team Bahrain Victorious	+ 3' 20"
4	Juan Ayuso (ESP)	Lidl–Trek	+ 8' 06"
5	Davide Piganzoli (ITA)	Visma–Lease a Bike	+ 54' 01"
6	Quinn Simmons (USA)	Lidl–Trek	+ 1h 25' 46"
7	Matthew Riccitello (USA)	Decathlon CMA CGM	+ 2h 01' 27"
8	Pablo Castrillo (ESP)	Movistar Team	+ 2h 22' 01"
9	Raúl García Pierna (ESP)	Movistar Team	+ 2h 42' 50"
10	Kévin Vauquelin (FRA)	Netcompany INEOS	+ 2h 51' 35"

=== Team classification ===
Final team classification (1–10)
Rank	Team	Time
1	(Germany) Lidl–Trek	224h 57' 43"
2	(United Arab Emirates) UAE Team Emirates XRG	+ 36' 57"
3	(Germany) Red Bull–Bora–Hansgrohe	+ 1h 06' 22"
4	(France) Decathlon CMA CGM	+ 1h 47' 44"
5	(Netherlands) Visma–Lease a Bike	+ 2h 18' 03"
6	(United States) EF Education–EasyPost	+ 3h 38' 20"
7	(United Kingdom) Netcompany INEOS	+ 4h 49' 54"
8	Team Bahrain Victorious	+ 5h 38' 20"
9	(France) Team TotalEnergies	+ 5h 48' 37"
10	(Switzerland) Pinarello–Q36.5 Pro Cycling Team	+ 5h 49' 14"

== Broadcasting ==
As with previous editions, live television coverage was provided by France Télévisions in conjunction with the European Broadcasting Union. In the United States, coverage of the race was shown on Peacock and NBCSN, with select coverage on NBC.
