= 2026 Tour de France, Stage 1 to Stage 11 =

Cycling results

The 2026 Tour de France was the 113th edition of the Tour de France.

== Classification standings ==
Legend
Denotes the leader of the general classification	Denotes the leader of the mountains classification
Denotes the leader of the points classification	Denotes the leader of the young rider classification
Denotes the leader of the team classification	Denotes the winner of the combativity award

== Stage 1 ==
4 July 2026 – Barcelona to Barcelona, 19.6 km (12.2 mi) (TTT)

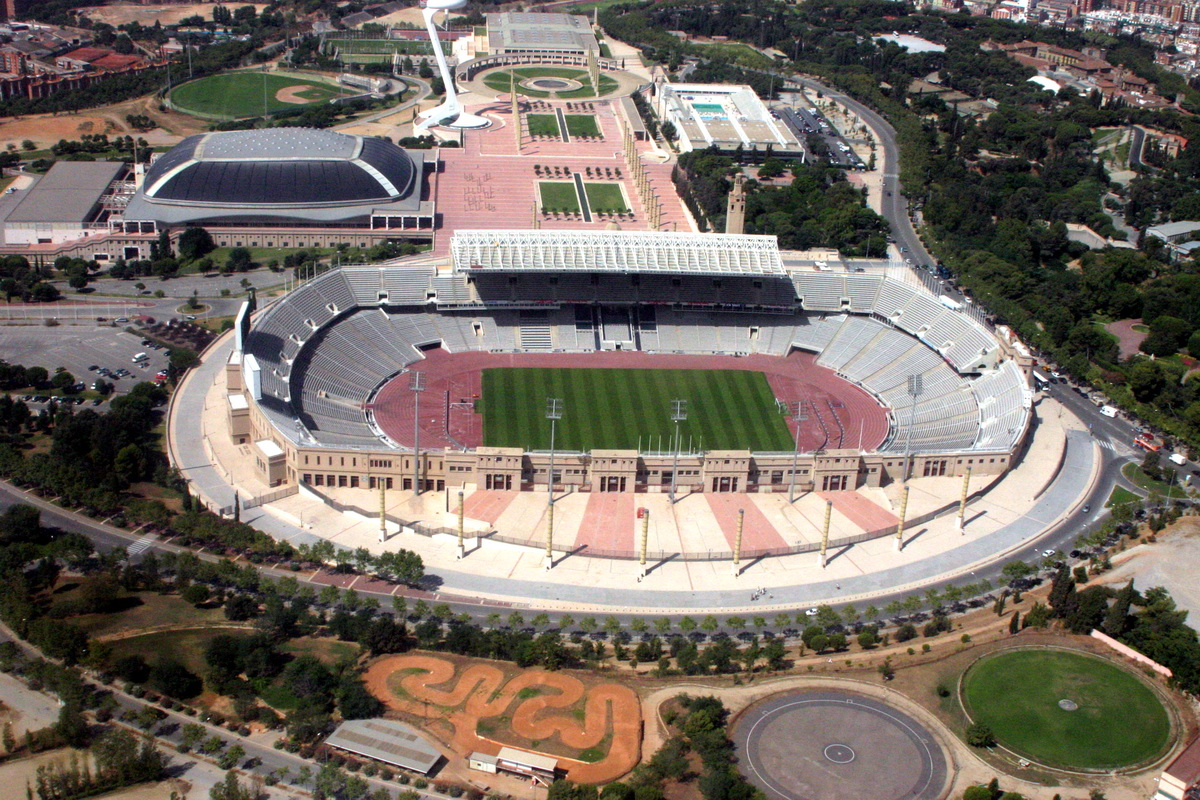
The stage finished adjacent to the Estadi Olímpic Lluís Companys on the Montjuïc hill above Barcelona, Spain

The first stage of the race was a team time trial in Barcelona, Spain. The 19.6 km (12.2 mi) course started at the Fòrum and finished at the Estadi Olímpic Louis Companys on the Montjuïc hill above Barcelona. Two climbs were located in the last 4 km (2.5 mi) – Côte de Montjuïc (1.1 km at an average gradient of 5.1%) followed by the Côte du Stade Olympique (800 metres at an average gradient of 7%) to the finish line. The team time trial used a new format where the stage time for each team would be determined by the first rider across the finish line – each rider would receive their own time for the general classification.

Netcompany INEOS initially looked fast through the first two intermediate checks, however Kévin Vauquelin then had a puncture and 2019 winner Egan Bernal was dropped. Two-time world time trial champion Filippo Ganna attacked the climbs instead of Vauquelin, with Ganna setting a time 31 seconds faster than Alpecin–Premier Tech. Lidl–Trek started faster, but Juan Ayuso slowed on the climb, eventually finishing 8 seconds slower than Netcompany INEOS. Red Bull–Bora–Hansgrohe had both Remco Evenepoel and Florian Lipowitz attempt the final climb, however Lipowitz was dropped and Evenepoel eventually set a time 11 seconds slower than Netcompany INEOS.

Visma–Lease a Bike was the penultimate team to tackle the course, with four riders attempting the climbs. Jonas Vingegaard attacked and crossed the finish line 8 seconds faster than Netcompany INEOS. The final team to attempt the course was UAE Team Emirates XRG, but the team was slower throughout the course than Visma–Lease a Bike. In the final climb to the finish, defending champion Tadej Pogačar attacked and reduced the deficit, eventually finishing 12 seconds behind Visma–Lease a Bike.

Visma–Lease a Bike therefore took the stage win, ahead of Netcompany INEOS and UAE Team Emirates XRG. Vingegaard took his first yellow jersey since their victory at the 2023 race, and was "visibly pleased" following the stage, thanking his teammates for the effort and calling it "the perfect start". Bernal was awarded the green jersey of the points classification as he completed the first section of the course the fastest, and Pogačar was awarded the polka dot jersey of the mountains classification as he completed the final uphill section of the course the fastest. Ayuso took the lead in the young rider classification.

Stage 1 result
Rank	Team	Time
1	(Netherlands) Visma–Lease a Bike	21' 47"
2	(United Kingdom) Netcompany INEOS	+ 8"
3	(United Arab Emirates) UAE Team Emirates XRG	+ 12"
4	(Germany) Lidl–Trek	+ 16"
5	(Germany) Red Bull–Bora–Hansgrohe	+ 19"
6	(France) Decathlon CMA CGM	+ 39"
7	(Belgium) Alpecin–Premier Tech	+ 39"
8	(France) Groupama–FDJ United	+ 41"
9	Team Bahrain Victorious	+ 47"
10	(Australia) Team Jayco–AlUla	+ 51"

General classification after stage 1
Rank	Rider	Team	Time
1	Jonas Vingegaard (DEN)	Visma–Lease a Bike	21' 47"
2	Filippo Ganna (ITA)	Netcompany INEOS	+ 8"
3	Tadej Pogačar (SLO)	UAE Team Emirates XRG	+ 12"
4	Juan Ayuso (ESP)	Lidl–Trek	+ 16"
5	Remco Evenepoel (BEL)	Red Bull–Bora–Hansgrohe	+ 19"
6	Isaac del Toro (MEX)	UAE Team Emirates XRG	+ 26"
7	Davide Piganzoli (ITA)	Visma–Lease a Bike	+ 28"
8	Florian Lipowitz (GER)	Red Bull–Bora–Hansgrohe	+ 35"
9	Tobias Foss (NOR)	Netcompany INEOS	+ 38"
10	Paul Seixas (FRA)	Decathlon CMA CGM	+ 39"

== Stage 2 ==
5 July 2026 – Tarragona to Barcelona, 168.5 km (104.7 mi)

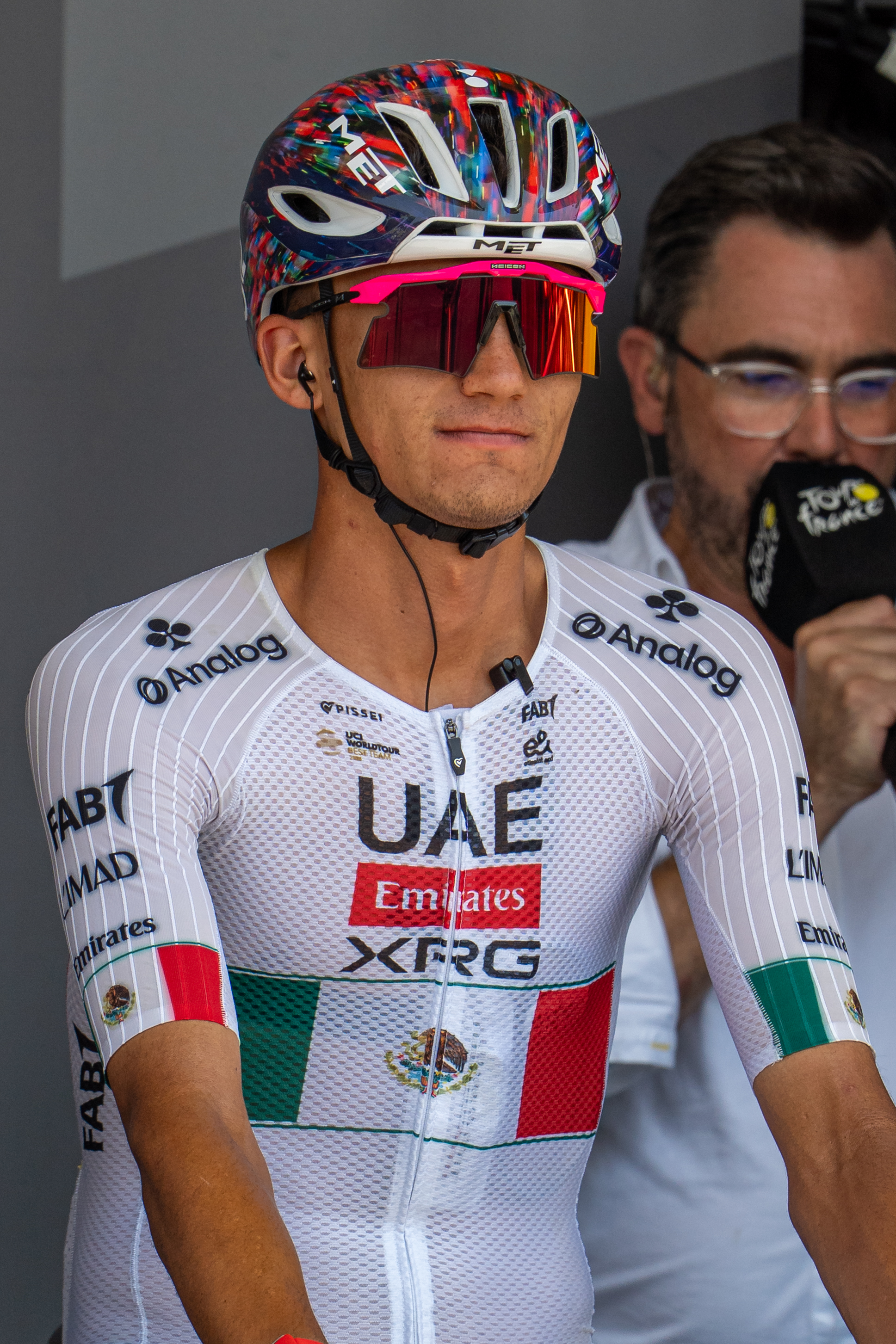
Winner of stage 2, Isaac del Toro (UAE Team Emirates XRG), pictured on stage 5

The race remained in Spain for the second stage, with a 168.5 km (104.7 mi) course from Tarragona to Barcelona, culminating with three laps of a finishing circuit on the Montjuïc hill above Barcelona. The stage featured four categorised climbs, the second-category Côte de Begues and three ascents of the Côte du Château de Montjuïc (1.6 km at an average gradient of 9.3%). The finish was located at the top of an uncategorised climb in Montjuïc, 700 metres in length with an average gradient of 7%.

An breakaway of Frank van den Broek (Team Picnic–PostNL), Felix Engelhardt (Team Jayco–AlUla), and Alex Molenaar (Caja Rural–Seguros RGA) formed in the first 10 km (6.2 mi). At the intermediate sprint, Biniam Girmay (NSN Cycling Team) beat Mads Pedersen (Lidl–Trek) and Jasper Philipsen (Alpecin–Premier Tech). On the Côte de Begues climb, van den Broek was dropped but Engelhardt and Molenaar stayed out front until the race had entered Barcelona, with about 30 km (19 mi) remaining.

Entering the Montjuïc finishing circuit, the peloton gradually reduced in size thanks to a fast pace set by UAE Team Emirates XRG. By the final climb, only 35 riders remained at the front, with Adam Yates (UAE Team Emirates XRG) continuing the fast pace and dissuading attacks by GC contenders. The group stayed together, descending to the bottom on the final climb to the finish line. In the uphill sprint to the finish, Pogačar ensured that his teammate Isaac del Toro took the stage victory, with media calling the stage "a dominant ride by UAE Team Emirates XRG". Evenepoel finished third ahead of Vingegaard, who maintained his lead in the GC albeit with his lead cut to 6 seconds. Del Toro took the green jersey and maintained his lead in the young rider classification. Molenaar took the lead in the mountains classification, by virtue of his day in the breakaway.

Stage 2 result
Rank	Rider	Team	Time
1	Isaac del Toro (MEX)	UAE Team Emirates XRG	3h 40' 01"
2	Tadej Pogačar (SLO)	UAE Team Emirates XRG	+ 0"
3	Remco Evenepoel (BEL)	Red Bull–Bora–Hansgrohe	+ 0"
4	Jonas Vingegaard (DEN)	Visma–Lease a Bike	+ 0"
5	Mattias Skjelmose (DEN)	Lidl–Trek	+ 3"
6	Tobias Halland Johannessen (NOR)	Uno-X Mobility	+ 3"
7	Romain Grégoire (FRA)	Groupama–FDJ United	+ 3"
8	Lenny Martinez (FRA)	Team Bahrain Victorious	+ 3"
9	Paul Seixas (FRA)	Decathlon CMA CGM	+ 3"
10	Tom Pidcock (GBR)	Pinarello–Q36.5 Pro Cycling Team	+ 3"

General classification after stage 2
Rank	Rider	Team	Time
1	Jonas Vingegaard (DEN)	Visma–Lease a Bike	4h 01' 48"
2	Tadej Pogačar (SLO)	UAE Team Emirates XRG	+ 6"
3	Remco Evenepoel (BEL)	Red Bull–Bora–Hansgrohe	+ 15"
4	Isaac del Toro (MEX)	UAE Team Emirates XRG	+ 16"
5	Juan Ayuso (ESP)	Lidl–Trek	+ 19"
6	Paul Seixas (FRA)	Decathlon CMA CGM	+ 42"
7	Romain Grégoire (FRA)	Groupama–FDJ United	+ 44"
8	Florian Lipowitz (GER)	Red Bull–Bora–Hansgrohe	+ 45"
9	Lenny Martinez (FRA)	Team Bahrain Victorious	+ 53"
10	Tom Pidcock (GBR)	Pinarello–Q36.5 Pro Cycling Team	+ 1' 00"

== Stage 3 ==
6 July 2026 – Granollers to Les Angles, 195.9 km (121.7 mi)

The third stage of the race took riders northwards into France and into the Pyrenees, on a 195.9 km (121.7 mi) mountainous course from Granollers to Les Angles. The stage featured four categorised climbs, including the first-category Col de Toses (9.3 km at an average gradient of 6.5%) and the third-category finish to Les Angles (1.7 km at an average gradient of 6.5%). Owing to wildfires in the Pyrénées-Orientales department, spectators were discouraged from attending the race in France, with no spectators at the finish.

On the stage, it took 65 km (40 mi) for a breakaway to be formed, after numerous attacks were chased down by UAE Team Emirates XRG and Visma–Lease a Bike. 20 riders were in the breakaway included Pedersen and Alex Baudin (EF Education–EasyPost). Pedersen won the intermediate sprints, and Baudin took the points of the mountains classification at the Col de Toses. As UAE Team Emirates XRG increased the pace, the break reduced in size to 6 riders approaching the Col de la Calvaire. Baudin broke free, taking more mountain points at the top of the Col, but was swallowed by the peloton shortly after.

On the final climb to Les Angles, UAE Team Emirates XRG set a fast pace, with del Toro attacking with 300 metres remaining to set up an attack by Pogačar. Pogačar crossed the line 2 seconds ahead of Vingegaard, Richard Carapaz (EF Education–EasyPost) and Paul Seixas (Decathlon CMA CGM) with Pogačar taking the yellow jersey off Vingegaard as a result. Baudin took the polka dot jersey of the mountains classification, and del Toro maintained their lead in the young rider classification. Pogačar called the hot weather a "logistical nightmare", owing to the constant need for water bottles from the team car.

Stage 3 result
Rank	Rider	Team	Time
1	Tadej Pogačar (SLO)	UAE Team Emirates XRG	4h 45' 11"
2	Jonas Vingegaard (DEN)	Visma–Lease a Bike	+ 2"
3	Richard Carapaz (ECU)	EF Education–EasyPost	+ 2"
4	Paul Seixas (FRA)	Decathlon CMA CGM	+ 2"
5	Tobias Halland Johannessen (NOR)	Uno-X Mobility	+ 4"
6	Lennert van Eetvelt (BEL)	Lotto–Intermarché	+ 4"
7	Florian Lipowitz (GER)	Red Bull–Bora–Hansgrohe	+ 4"
8	Remco Evenepoel (BEL)	Red Bull–Bora–Hansgrohe	+ 4"
9	Isaac del Toro (MEX)	UAE Team Emirates XRG	+ 4"
10	Juan Ayuso (ESP)	Lidl–Trek	+ 4"

General classification after stage 3
Rank	Rider	Team	Time
1	Tadej Pogačar (SLO)	UAE Team Emirates XRG	8h 46' 55"
2	Jonas Vingegaard (DEN)	Visma–Lease a Bike	+ 0"
3	Remco Evenepoel (BEL)	Red Bull–Bora–Hansgrohe	+ 23"
4	Isaac del Toro (MEX)	UAE Team Emirates XRG	+ 24"
5	Juan Ayuso (ESP)	Lidl–Trek	+ 27"
6	Paul Seixas (FRA)	Decathlon CMA CGM	+ 48"
7	Florian Lipowitz (GER)	Red Bull–Bora–Hansgrohe	+ 53"
8	Lenny Martinez (FRA)	Team Bahrain Victorious	+ 1' 09"
9	Tobias Halland Johannessen (NOR)	Uno-X Mobility	+ 1' 11"
10	Ilan Van Wilder (BEL)	Soudal–Quick-Step	+ 1' 17"

== Stage 4 ==
7 July 2026 – Carcassonne to Foix, 181.9 km (113.0 mi)

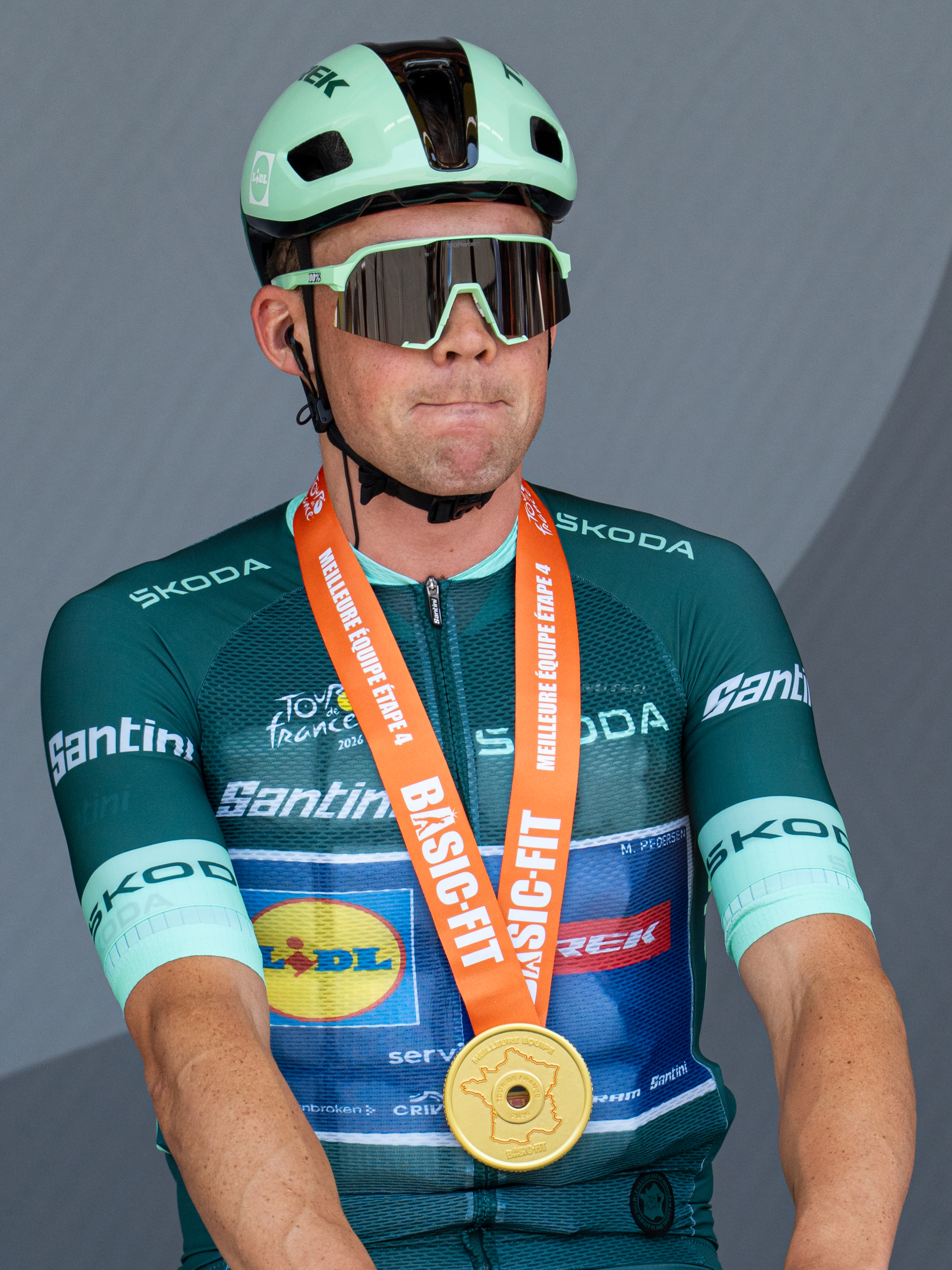
Stage winner Mads Pedersen (Lidl–Trek), pictured before stage 5

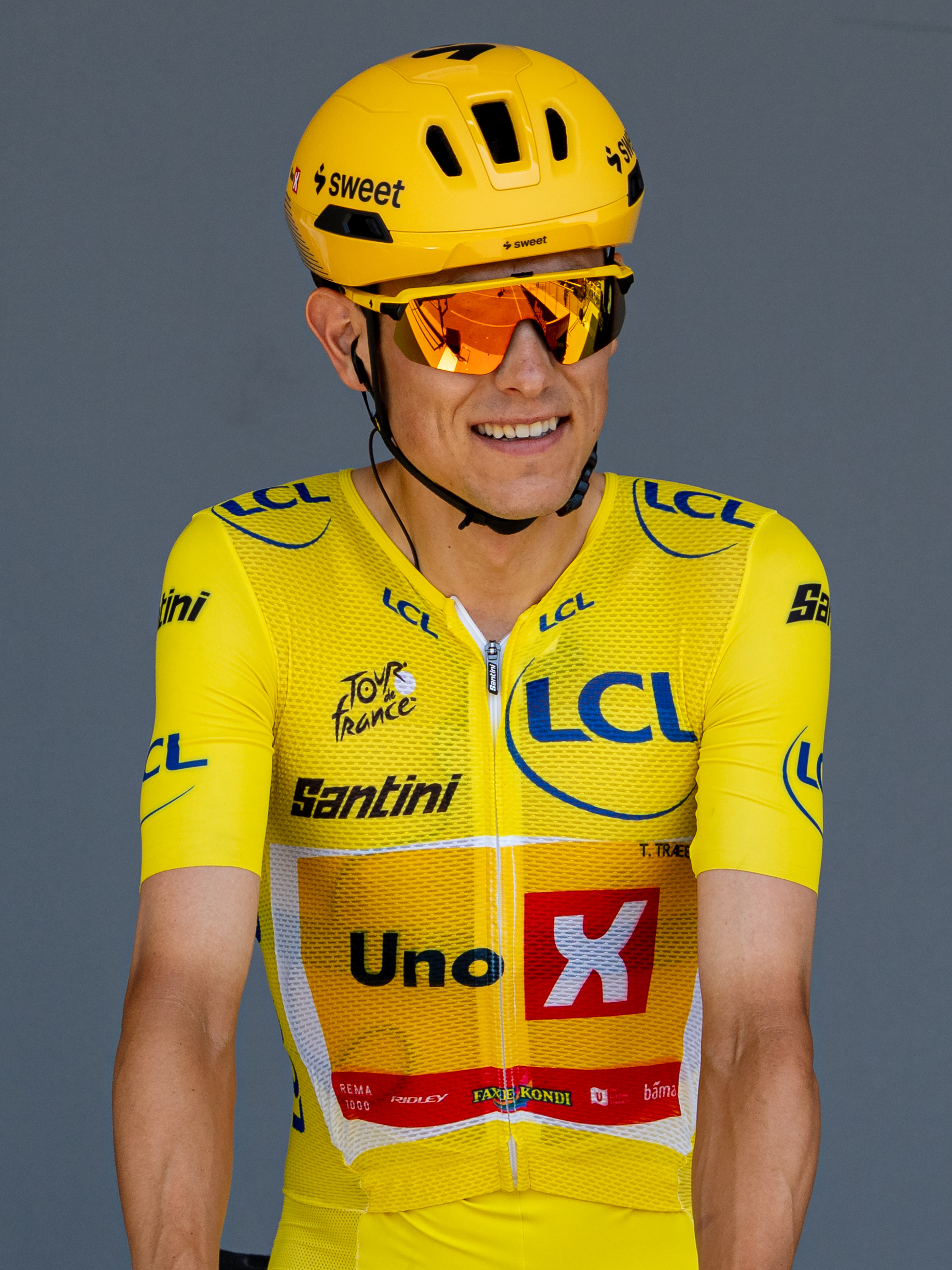
Torstein Træen (Uno-X Mobility) in the yellow jersey, pictured before stage 5

The fourth stage of the race stayed in the Pyrenees, with a hilly course from Carcassonne to Foix, with four categorised climbs (two second-category, one third-category and one fourth-category). The stage was held in "boiling temperatures", with temperatures around 40 °C (104 °F). The Union Cycliste Internationale (cycling's governing body) relaxed rules to allow riders to receive water more frequently, and increase the number of motorbikes handing out water bottles.

A breakaway of around 35 riders formed early in the stage. At the intermediate sprint, Girmay beat Philipsen and Pedersen to take maximum points, with Philipsen and Girmay dropping back to the peloton soon after. With 10 minutes between the break and the peloton, it became clear that the peloton was happy to let the break take the stage victory, and therefore teams and riders in the break attacked each other in the final 30 km (19 mi). Lidl–Trek chased down these attacks, setting a fast pace on behalf of Pedersen who took the stage win in a sprint finish ahead his teammate Quinn Simmons and Raúl García Pierna (Movistar Team).

The peloton finished the stage nearly 13 minutes behind Pedersen, and therefore Torstein Træen (Uno-X Mobility) – the highest placed GC rider in the breakaway – took the yellow jersey. Træen led the GC by 28 seconds over Sean Quinn (EF Education–EasyPost), with Mathias Vacek (Lidl–Trek) 3rd overall nearly 4 minutes behind, taking the white jersey of the young rider classification. Pogačar was 4th overall, 7 minutes 53 seconds behind, and considered that Træen would hold the jersey for a number of stages, given the margin between him and other GC contenders.

Stage 4 result
Rank	Rider	Team	Time
1	Mads Pedersen (DEN)	Lidl–Trek	4h 10' 45"
2	Quinn Simmons (USA)	Lidl–Trek	+ 0"
3	Raúl García Pierna (ESP)	Movistar Team	+ 0"
4	Marco Frigo (ITA)	NSN Cycling Team	+ 0"
5	Ramses Debruyne (BEL)	Alpecin–Premier Tech	+ 0"
6	Kévin Vauquelin (FRA)	Netcompany INEOS	+ 0"
7	Sean Quinn (USA)	EF Education–EasyPost	+ 0"
8	Torstein Træen (NOR)	Uno-X Mobility	+ 0"
9	Pablo Castrillo (ESP)	Movistar Team	+ 0"
10	Mathias Vacek (CZE)	Lidl–Trek	+ 0"

General classification after stage 4
Rank	Rider	Team	Time
1	Torstein Træen (NOR)	Uno-X Mobility	13h 02' 46"
2	Sean Quinn (USA)	EF Education–EasyPost	+ 28"
3	Mathias Vacek (CZE)	Lidl–Trek	+ 3' 50"
4	Tadej Pogačar (SLO)	UAE Team Emirates XRG	+ 7' 53"
5	Jonas Vingegaard (DEN)	Visma–Lease a Bike	+ 7' 53"
6	Ramses Debruyne (BEL)	Alpecin–Premier Tech	+ 8' 06"
7	Remco Evenepoel (BEL)	Red Bull–Bora–Hansgrohe	+ 8' 16"
8	Isaac del Toro (MEX)	UAE Team Emirates XRG	+ 8' 17"
9	Juan Ayuso (ESP)	Lidl–Trek	+ 8' 20"
10	Paul Seixas (FRA)	Decathlon CMA CGM	+ 8' 41"

== Stage 5 ==
8 July 2026 – Lannemezan to Pau, 158.3 km (98.4 mi)

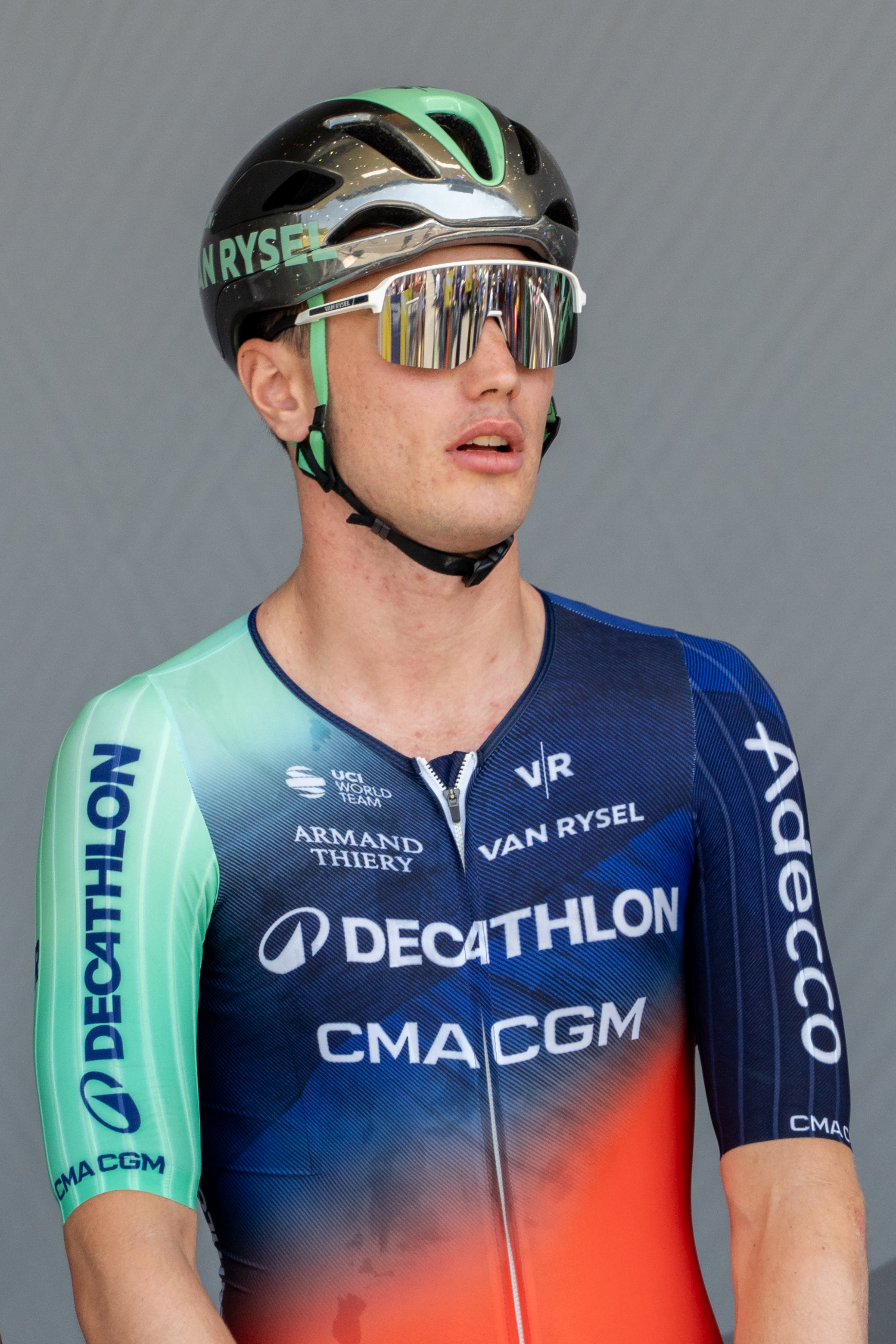
Stage winner Olav Kooij (Decathlon CMA CGM), pictured prior to the start of the stage

The fifth stage of the race took riders from Lannemezan to Pau on a flat course, with one third-category climb on the 158.3 km (98.4 mi) route.

Owing to the heat and the expected sprint finish, Baptiste Veistroffer (Lotto–Intermarché) was the lone breakaway rider for much of the day, with a maximum lead of 4 minutes. At the intermediate sprint, Max Kanter (XDS Astana Team) beat Pedersen, Girmay and Philipsen. Veistroffer was caught with around 14 km (8.7 mi) remaining. Approaching the finish, a crash occurred with 5.5 km (3.4 mi) to go – no GC riders or contenders for the sprint finish were involved. A reduced group of 20 riders headed for a sprint finish, with Olav Kooij (Decathlon CMA CGM) beating Kanter and Tim Merlier (Soudal–Quick-Step) to take his first stage win at the Tour. Pedersen finished 7th in the green jersey, extending their lead in the points classification. Træen remained in the yellow jersey and Baudin remained in the polka dot jersey of the mountains classification after an uneventful day for the peloton.

Stage 5 result
Rank	Rider	Team	Time
1	Olav Kooij (NED)	Decathlon CMA CGM	3h 29' 07"
2	Max Kanter (GER)	XDS Astana Team	+ 0"
3	Tim Merlier (BEL)	Soudal–Quick-Step	+ 0"
4	Huub Artz (NED)	Lotto–Intermarché	+ 0"
5	Jasper Philipsen (BEL)	Alpecin–Premier Tech	+ 0"
6	Biniam Girmay (ERI)	NSN Cycling Team	+ 0"
7	Mads Pedersen (DEN)	Lidl–Trek	+ 0"
8	Milan Fretin (BEL)	Cofidis	+ 0"
9	Anthony Turgis (FRA)	Team TotalEnergies	+ 0"
10	Søren Wærenskjold (NOR)	Uno-X Mobility	+ 0"

General classification after stage 5
Rank	Rider	Team	Time
1	Torstein Træen (NOR)	Uno-X Mobility	16h 32' 07"
2	Sean Quinn (USA)	EF Education–EasyPost	+ 28"
3	Mathias Vacek (CZE)	Lidl–Trek	+ 3' 50"
4	Tadej Pogačar (SLO)	UAE Team Emirates XRG	+ 7' 53"
5	Jonas Vingegaard (DEN)	Visma–Lease a Bike	+ 7' 53"
6	Ramses Debruyne (BEL)	Alpecin–Premier Tech	+ 8' 06"
7	Remco Evenepoel (BEL)	Red Bull–Bora–Hansgrohe	+ 8' 16"
8	Isaac del Toro (MEX)	UAE Team Emirates XRG	+ 8' 17"
9	Juan Ayuso (ESP)	Lidl–Trek	+ 8' 20"
10	Paul Seixas (FRA)	Decathlon CMA CGM	+ 8' 41"

== Stage 6 ==
9 July 2026 – Pau to Gavarnie-Gèdre, 186.2 km (115.7 mi)

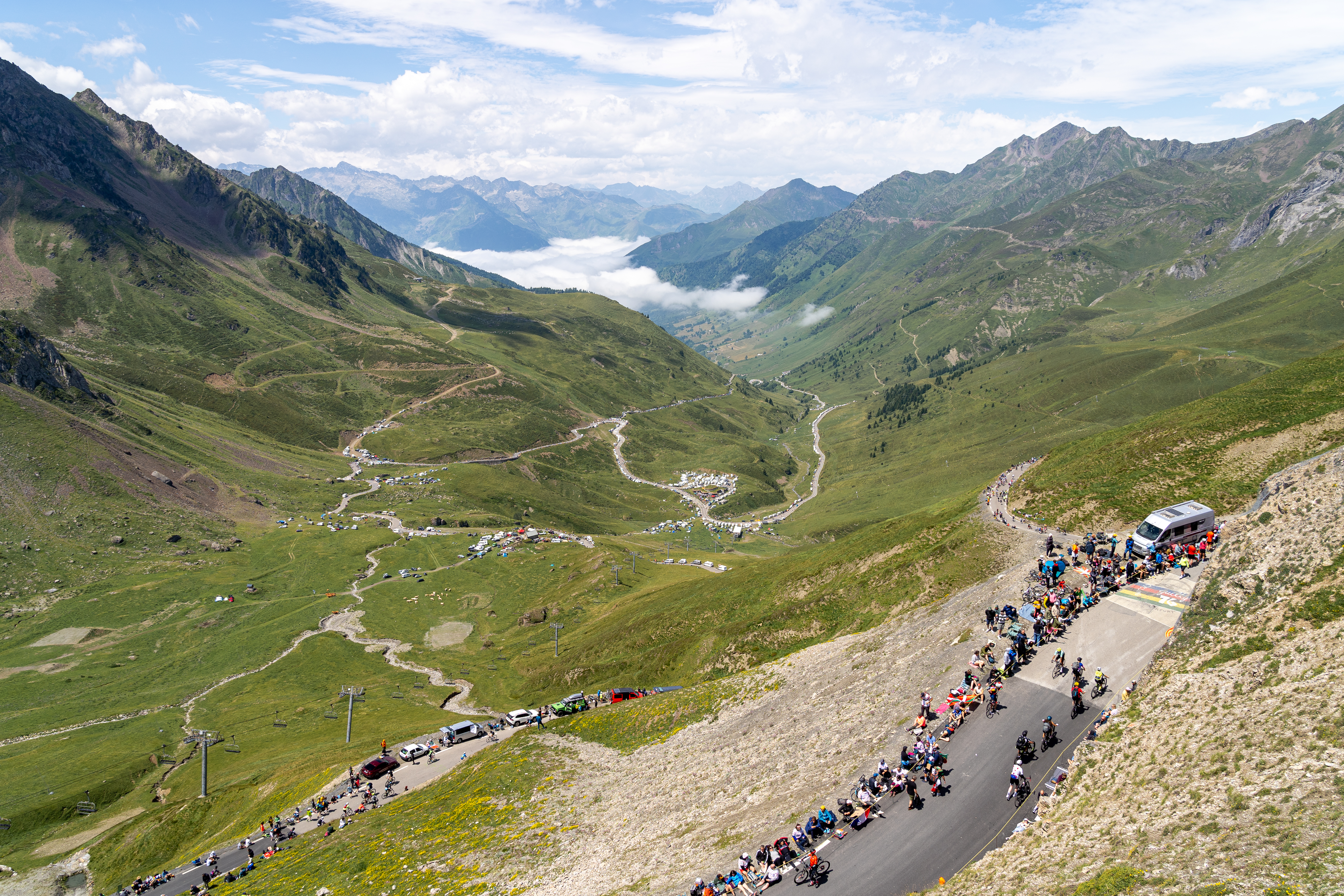
View from the Col du Tourmalet

The sixth stage took the riders back into the Pyrenees, with a 186.2 km (115.7 mi) mountain stage from Pau to Gavarnie-Gèdre, with five categorised climbs including the first-category Col d'Aspin (12 km at an average gradient of 6.5%), the hors catégorie climb of Col du Tourmalet (17.1 km at an average gradient of 7.3%, with the summit at an elevation of 2,115 m (6,939 ft)), before a summit finish at the second-category climb to Gavarnie-Gèdre (18.7 km at an average gradient of 3.7%).

The weather remained hot, with temperatures around 35 °C (95 °F) for the first high mountain stage of the Tour. A three-man breakaway emerged early in the stage, with Pedersen successfully claiming maximum points in the intermediate sprint to extend his lead in the points classification. Other riders attempted to escape, as the peloton approached the large climbs of the Col d'Aspin and Col du Tourmalet.

On the Col du Tourmalet, UAE Team Emirates XRG set a fast pace, with the leading group soon less than 20 riders and Traeen in the yellow jersey losing contact 11 km (6.8 mi) from the top. With 5 km (3.1 mi) to the summit of the Tourmalet, del Toro attacked with Pogačar following. Vingegaard immediately began a solo chase, as the pace was too fast for Seixas, Evenepoel and Lipowitz. Pogačar then went solo with 43 km (27 mi) to the finish, summiting the Tourmalet alone, with a 31 second gap to Vingegaard and nearly 90 seconds to the Seixas, Lipowitz and del Toro group. Pogačar then descended at pace, more than doubling his advantage to Vingegaard before he began the climb to the finish at Gavarnie-Gèdre. Pogačar continued to push on the climb, taking the stage victory by 2 minutes 38 seconds ahead of Vingegaard – his largest margin of a stage win at the Tour. Six GC contenders (del Toro, Evenepoel, Seixas, Lipowitz, Ayuso and Mattias Skjelmose (Lidl–Trek)) finished a further 19 seconds behind. Pogačar therefore took the yellow jersey, with a lead of 2 minutes 42 seconds over Vingegaard, with del Toro (the new leader of the young rider classification) a further 45 seconds behind. Pogačar also took the lead in the mountains classification. Media praised Pogačar's solo victory, calling his attack "assertive" and his lead "ominous", as well as noting that he set a new record time for the ascent of the Tourmalet by two minutes.

On the descent from the Tourmalet, Traeen had clipped the wheel of his teammate and crashed hard. After medical attention, he continued the stage – eventually finishing around 30 minutes behind Pogačar. Uno-X Mobility later reported that Traeen had a "concussion and multiple rib fractures" and would not start the next day.

Stage 6 result
Rank	Rider	Team	Time
1	Tadej Pogačar (SLO)	UAE Team Emirates XRG	4h 32' 07"
2	Jonas Vingegaard (DEN)	Visma–Lease a Bike	+ 2' 38"
3	Isaac del Toro (MEX)	UAE Team Emirates XRG	+ 2' 57"
4	Remco Evenepoel (BEL)	Red Bull–Bora–Hansgrohe	+ 2' 57"
5	Paul Seixas (FRA)	Decathlon CMA CGM	+ 2' 57"
6	Florian Lipowitz (GER)	Red Bull–Bora–Hansgrohe	+ 2' 57"
7	Juan Ayuso (ESP)	Lidl–Trek	+ 2' 57"
8	Mattias Skjelmose (DEN)	Lidl–Trek	+ 2' 57"
9	Lenny Martinez (FRA)	Team Bahrain Victorious	+ 3' 02"
10	Sepp Kuss (USA)	Visma–Lease a Bike	+ 3' 06"

General classification after stage 6
Rank	Rider	Team	Time
1	Tadej Pogačar (SLO)	UAE Team Emirates XRG	21h 11' 57"
2	Jonas Vingegaard (DEN)	Visma–Lease a Bike	+ 2' 42"
3	Isaac del Toro (MEX)	UAE Team Emirates XRG	+ 3' 27"
4	Remco Evenepoel (BEL)	Red Bull–Bora–Hansgrohe	+ 3' 30"
5	Juan Ayuso (ESP)	Lidl–Trek	+ 3' 34"
6	Paul Seixas (FRA)	Decathlon CMA CGM	+ 3' 55"
7	Florian Lipowitz (GER)	Red Bull–Bora–Hansgrohe	+ 4' 00"
8	Lenny Martinez (FRA)	Team Bahrain Victorious	+ 4' 21"
9	Mattias Skjelmose (DEN)	Lidl–Trek	+ 4' 57"
10	Mathias Vacek (CZE)	Lidl–Trek	+ 7' 10"

== Stage 7 ==
10 July 2026 – Hagetmau to Bordeaux, 175.1 km (108.8 mi)

Leaving the Pyrenees, the race headed north from Hagetmau to Bordeaux, on a flat course with one fourth-category climb. A sprint finish was expected.

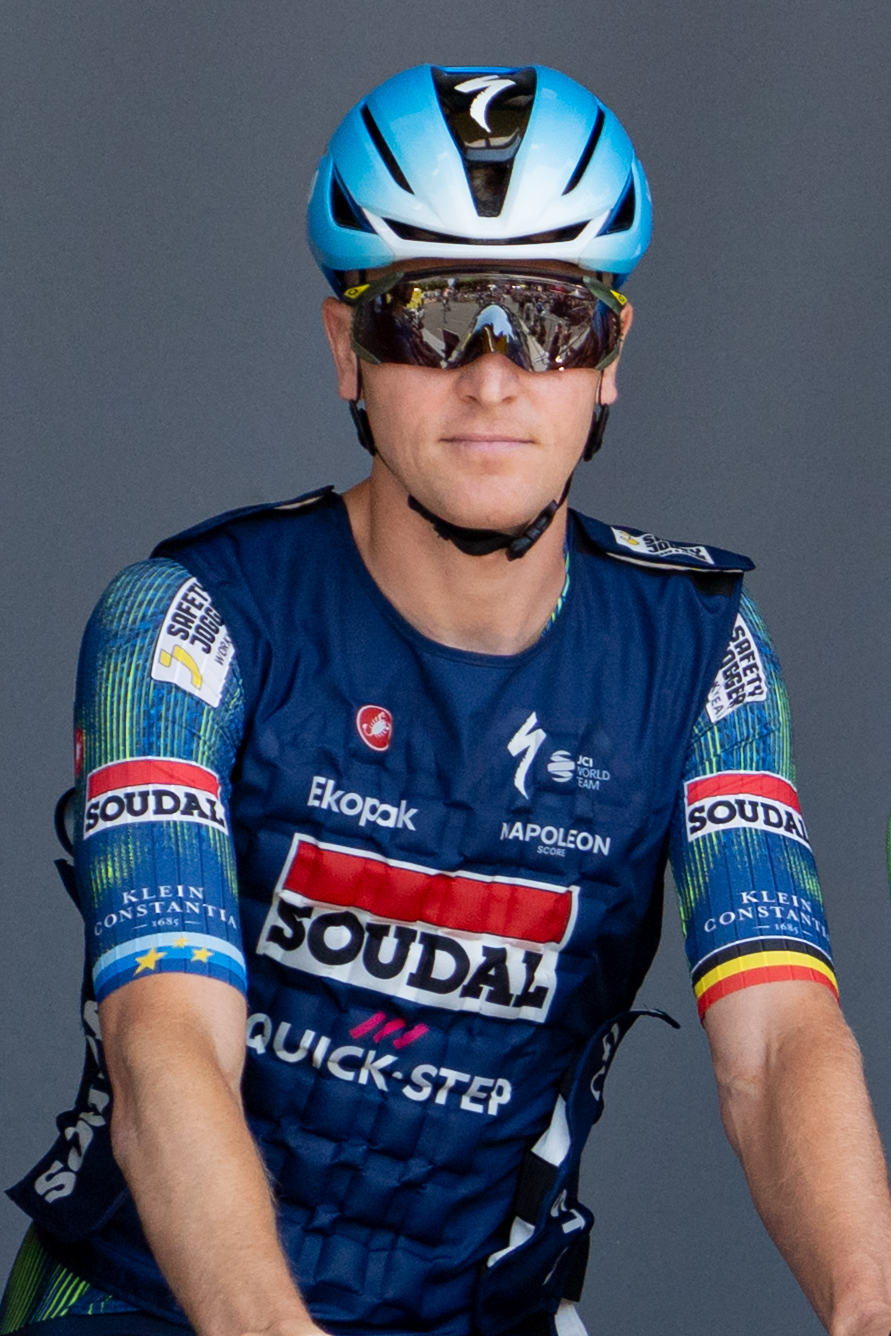
Stage winner Tim Merlier (Soudal–Quick-Step), pictured before stage 5

On the stage, Veistroffer set off in the breakaway for the second time this Tour, joined by Jakub Otruba (Caja Rural–Seguros RGA). Their lead did not extend beyond 2 minutes. At the intermediate sprint with 55 km (34 mi) remaining, Pedersen was first of the peloton across the line, with Girmay and Kanter second and third. Uno-X Mobility set a high pace, and the break was swallowed with 18 km (11 mi) to go. Approaching the finish in Bordeaux, teams prepared their sprint trains. With 2 km (1.2 mi) to go, Alpecin–Premier Tech moved to the front, riding for a Philipsen stage victory. However, their sprint train finished too early, ending with around 250 m (820 ft) to the line. Merlier took advantage, accelerating to take the stage victory ahead of Søren Wærenskjold (Uno-X Mobility) and Girmay. Philipsen finished 5th, with Pedersen in the green jersey finishing 9th. There were no changes in the classifications as a result of the stage, with Pedersen leading the points classification by around 60 points ahead of Girmay and Kanter.

Stage 7 result
Rank	Rider	Team	Time
1	Tim Merlier (BEL)	Soudal–Quick-Step	3h 44' 20"
2	Søren Wærenskjold (NOR)	Uno-X Mobility	+ 0"
3	Biniam Girmay (ERI)	NSN Cycling Team	+ 0"
4	Max Kanter (GER)	XDS Astana Team	+ 0"
5	Jasper Philipsen (BEL)	Alpecin–Premier Tech	+ 0"
6	Phil Bauhaus (GER)	Team Bahrain Victorious	+ 0"
7	Huub Artz (NED)	Lotto–Intermarché	+ 0"
8	Dorian Godon (FRA)	Netcompany INEOS	+ 0"
9	Mads Pedersen (DEN)	Lidl–Trek	+ 0"
10	Tom Van Asbroeck (BEL)	NSN Cycling Team	+ 0"

General classification after stage 7
Rank	Rider	Team	Time
1	Tadej Pogačar (SLO)	UAE Team Emirates XRG	24h 56' 17"
2	Jonas Vingegaard (DEN)	Visma–Lease a Bike	+ 2' 42"
3	Isaac del Toro (MEX)	UAE Team Emirates XRG	+ 3' 27"
4	Remco Evenepoel (BEL)	Red Bull–Bora–Hansgrohe	+ 3' 30"
5	Juan Ayuso (ESP)	Lidl–Trek	+ 3' 34"
6	Paul Seixas (FRA)	Decathlon CMA CGM	+ 3' 55"
7	Florian Lipowitz (GER)	Red Bull–Bora–Hansgrohe	+ 4' 00"
8	Lenny Martinez (FRA)	Team Bahrain Victorious	+ 4' 21"
9	Mattias Skjelmose (DEN)	Lidl–Trek	+ 4' 57"
10	Mathias Vacek (CZE)	Lidl–Trek	+ 7' 10"

== Stage 8 ==
11 July 2026 – Périgueux to Bergerac, 180.4 km (112.1 mi)

The eighth stage took the race from Périgueux to Bergerac over a 180.4 km (112.1 mi) flat course, with two fourth-category climbs.

For the second stage in a row, a sprint finish was expected and therefore the peloton did not permit the breakaway of three riders (Otruba, Liam Slock (Lotto–Intermarché) and Thibault Guernalec (Team TotalEnergies)) to have more than a two minute margin. At the intermediate sprint, Philipsen beat Pedersen to the points remaining. With 30 km (19 mi) remaining, the gap to the breakaway had reduced to 90 seconds, with only Stock reaming out front. He rode strongly, with the gap slowly reducing as they approached the finish. With 10 km (6.2 mi) to go, Stock had a lead of around a minute, and the peloton began to push hard to chase him down. With 3 km (1.9 mi) to go, the gap was down to 10 seconds and Stock allowed himself to be captured by the peloton. Approaching the sprint finish, XDS Astana Team had good positioning through the final corner however Merlier had the best acceleration – beating Girmay, Kooij and Philipsen to take his second stage win in a row. Following his stage victories, Merlier moved into second place in the points classification, 15 points behind Pedersen.

Stage 8 result
Rank	Rider	Team	Time
1	Tim Merlier (BEL)	Soudal–Quick-Step	3h 52' 50"
2	Biniam Girmay (ERI)	NSN Cycling Team	+ 0"
3	Olav Kooij (NED)	Decathlon CMA CGM	+ 0"
4	Jasper Philipsen (BEL)	Alpecin–Premier Tech	+ 0"
5	Pavel Bittner (CZE)	Team Picnic–PostNL	+ 0"
6	Rick Pluimers (NED)	Tudor Pro Cycling Team	+ 0"
7	Pascal Ackermann (GER)	Team Jayco–AlUla	+ 0"
8	Clément Russo (FRA)	Groupama–FDJ United	+ 0"
9	Max Kanter (GER)	XDS Astana Team	+ 0"
10	Milan Fretin (BEL)	Cofidis	+ 0"

General classification after stage 8
Rank	Rider	Team	Time
1	Tadej Pogačar (SLO)	UAE Team Emirates XRG	28h 49' 07"
2	Jonas Vingegaard (DEN)	Visma–Lease a Bike	+ 2' 42"
3	Isaac del Toro (MEX)	UAE Team Emirates XRG	+ 3' 27"
4	Remco Evenepoel (BEL)	Red Bull–Bora–Hansgrohe	+ 3' 30"
5	Juan Ayuso (ESP)	Lidl–Trek	+ 3' 34"
6	Paul Seixas (FRA)	Decathlon CMA CGM	+ 3' 55"
7	Florian Lipowitz (GER)	Red Bull–Bora–Hansgrohe	+ 4' 00"
8	Lenny Martinez (FRA)	Team Bahrain Victorious	+ 4' 21"
9	Mattias Skjelmose (DEN)	Lidl–Trek	+ 4' 57"
10	Mathias Vacek (CZE)	Lidl–Trek	+ 7' 10"

== Stage 9 ==
12 July 2026 – Malemort to Ussel, 154.6 km (96.1 mi)

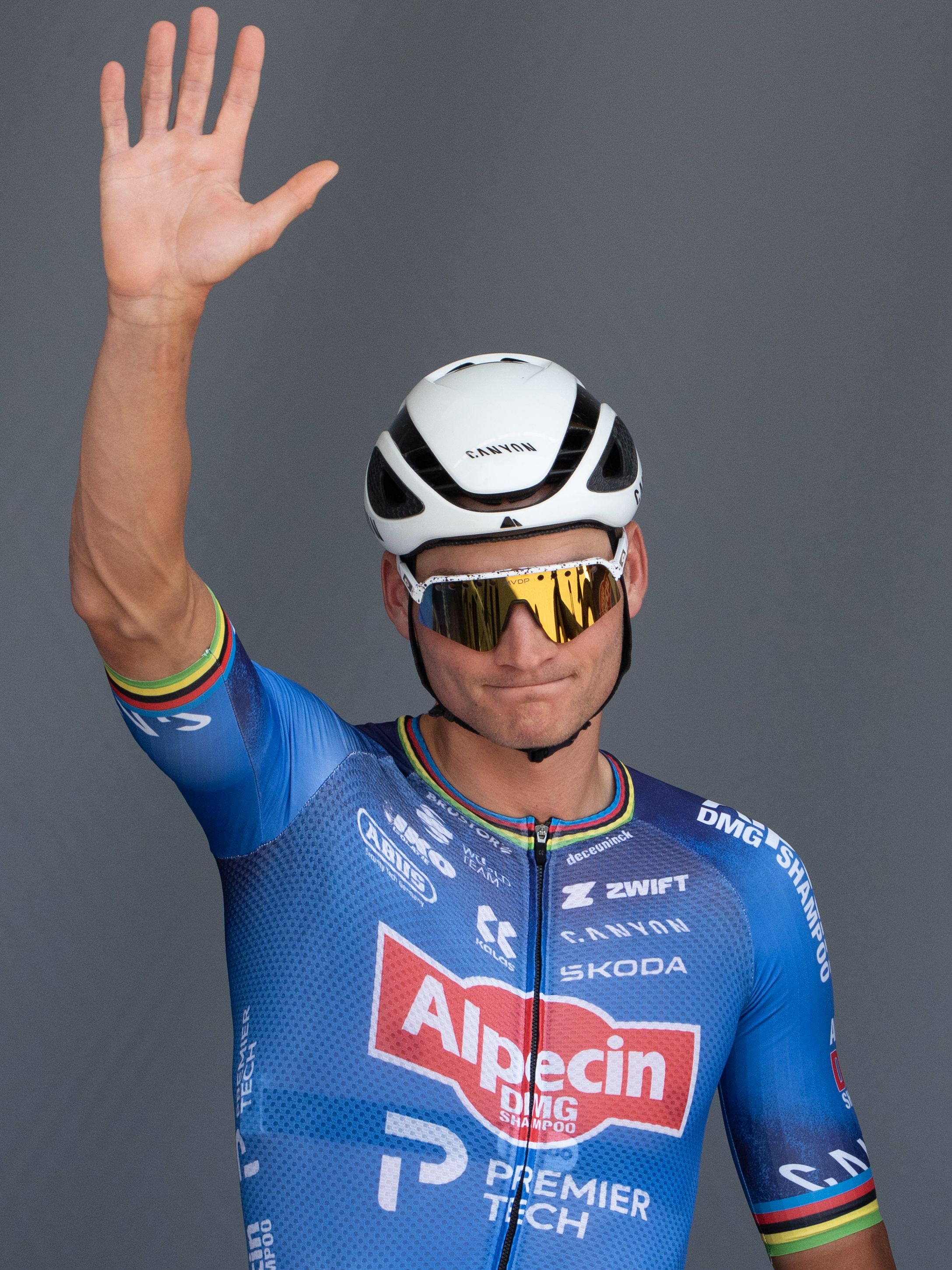
Stage winner Mathieu van der Poel (Alpecin–Premier Tech), pictured before stage 5

The ninth stage of the race headed north-east from Malemort to Ussel, with a hilly route in the Massif Central. The stage had four categorised climbs (one second-category, two third-category and one fourth-category). The stage was originally scheduled to be contested over 185.5 km (115.3 mi) but due to a red heatwave warning issued for the Corrèze department, the stage was shortened by 30 km (19 mi); neither start or finish location was altered. Some riders noted that the stage could have been held earlier in the day to reduce the high temperatures, whereas Pogačar noted that he would change the calendar to reduce the amount of racing in the summer heat of July and August.

The stage was ridden in intense heat, with temperatures around 38 °C (100 °F). Due to the shortened stage, the intermediate sprint was just 13 km (8.1 mi) into the stage – Pedersen beat Girmay to take maximum points. Several attempts at a breakaway were made, but were chased back by the peloton until a group of 16 riders escaped with 95 km (59 mi) to go. Simmons and Tobias Halland Johannessen (Uno-X Mobility) decided that the break was too large and attacked on the second-category Suc au May climb, gaining 30 seconds. Others followed, with a group of 8 riders (including Simmons, Johannessen, Baudin, Tom Pidcock (Pinarello–Q36.5 Pro Cycling Team) and Mathieu van der Poel (Alpecin–Premier Tech)) summitting the climb with 75 seconds lead over the peloton.

The group of 8 worked together to try to build an advantage, however both Netcompany INEOS and UAE Team Emirates XRG gave chase at the front of the peloton. With 50 km (31 mi) to go, the lead was around a minute, and the lead fell further to 30 seconds with 25 km (16 mi) to go. On the short but steep fourth-category climb of Mont Bressou (900 m at an average gradient of 7.3%), van der Poel attacked, with Johannessen and Pidcock able to follow. With Baudin making the trio a quartet on the descent, they raced towards the finish with a minute lead with 15 km (9.3 mi). Netcompany INEOS and Lidl–Trek gave chase, but the quartet made it to the final kilometre with a small advantage over the chasing peloton. In the final sprint for the line, van der Poel was significantly faster to take his first stage win of the Tour, with Johannessen and Pidcock second and third over the line. Ganna was the first of the chasing peloton across the line, six seconds later – with Pedersen in the green jersey of the points classification behind.

Stage 9 result
Rank	Rider	Team	Time
1	Mathieu van der Poel (NED)	Alpecin–Premier Tech	3h 27' 51"
2	Tobias Halland Johannessen (NOR)	Uno-X Mobility	+ 0"
3	Tom Pidcock (GBR)	Pinarello–Q36.5 Pro Cycling Team	+ 0"
4	Alex Baudin (FRA)	EF Education–EasyPost	+ 0"
5	Filippo Ganna (ITA)	Netcompany INEOS	+ 6"
6	Mads Pedersen (DEN)	Lidl–Trek	+ 6"
7	Michael Matthews (AUS)	Team Jayco–AlUla	+ 6"
8	Nicolas Breuillard (FRA)	Team TotalEnergies	+ 6"
9	Jordan Jegat (FRA)	Team TotalEnergies	+ 6"
10	Sean Quinn (USA)	EF Education–EasyPost	+ 6"

General classification after stage 9
Rank	Rider	Team	Time
1	Tadej Pogačar (SLO)	UAE Team Emirates XRG	32h 17' 04"
2	Jonas Vingegaard (DEN)	Visma–Lease a Bike	+ 2' 42"
3	Isaac del Toro (MEX)	UAE Team Emirates XRG	+ 3' 27"
4	Remco Evenepoel (BEL)	Red Bull–Bora–Hansgrohe	+ 3' 30"
5	Juan Ayuso (ESP)	Lidl–Trek	+ 3' 34"
6	Paul Seixas (FRA)	Decathlon CMA CGM	+ 3' 55"
7	Florian Lipowitz (GER)	Red Bull–Bora–Hansgrohe	+ 4' 00"
8	Lenny Martinez (FRA)	Team Bahrain Victorious	+ 4' 21"
9	Mattias Skjelmose (DEN)	Lidl–Trek	+ 4' 57"
10	Egan Bernal (COL)	Netcompany INEOS	+ 9' 12"

== Rest day 1 ==
13 July 2026 – Cantal

== Stage 10 ==
14 July 2026 – Aurillac to Le Lioran, 166.6 km (103.5 mi)

After the rest day, the race continued in the Massif Central on Bastille Day, with a 166.6 km (103.5 mi) mountain stage from Aurillac to a summit finish at Le Lioran. The stage included seven categorised climbs, including the first-category climbs of Col du Pertus (4.4 km at an average gradient of 8.5%) and Puy Mary - Pas de Peyrol (7.8 km at an average gradient of 6%).

The intermediate sprint was won by Pedersen, extending his lead in the points classification – beating Kanter, Germany and Philipsen. A breakaway went shortly afterwards, with around 30 riders up the road. The gap to the peloton was around 1 minute 40 seconds. On the Pas de Peyrol, Richard Carapaz (EF Education–EasyPost) attacked from the peloton, rapidly dismantling the breakaway on the climb. Pushing on, he had a lead of 23 seconds at the summit, and began the Col du Pertus climb with a lead of 1 minute 15 seconds ahead of the peloton as UAE Team Emirates XRG and Decathlon CMA CGM gave chase.

With a kilometre to the summit (and 15 km (9.3 mi) to the finish line), Pogačar attacked strongly. No rider could go with him, and he rode across the gap to Carapaz and passed him prior to the summit. Vingegaard and Evenepoel attempted to limit their losses, but Pogačar began the final climb to the finish at Le Lioran with a 40 second lead over the group of GC contenders.

Pogačar took his 3rd stage win of the Tour, extending his lead in the GC to over 3 and a half minutes. In the group behind, Evenepoel sprinted towards the line, finishing 32 seconds behind Pogačar and gaining a handful of seconds – allowing him to move into third overall ahead of Ayuso (who took the white jersey of the young rider classification). Del Toro fell to 7th overall, after finishing a minute behind the group of GC contenders.

Stage 10 result
Rank	Rider	Team	Time
1	Tadej Pogačar (SLO)	UAE Team Emirates XRG	3h 58' 08"
2	Remco Evenepoel (BEL)	Red Bull–Bora–Hansgrohe	+ 32"
3	Paul Seixas (FRA)	Decathlon CMA CGM	+ 34"
4	Florian Lipowitz (GER)	Red Bull–Bora–Hansgrohe	+ 34"
5	Juan Ayuso (ESP)	Lidl–Trek	+ 38"
6	Mattias Skjelmose (DEN)	Lidl–Trek	+ 38"
7	Jonas Vingegaard (DEN)	Visma–Lease a Bike	+ 44"
8	Isaac del Toro (MEX)	UAE Team Emirates XRG	+ 1' 31"
9	Tom Pidcock (GBR)	Pinarello–Q36.5 Pro Cycling Team	+ 1' 59"
10	Lenny Martinez (FRA)	Team Bahrain Victorious	+ 2' 03"

General classification after stage 10
Rank	Rider	Team	Time
1	Tadej Pogačar (SLO)	UAE Team Emirates XRG	36h 15' 02"
2	Jonas Vingegaard (DEN)	Visma–Lease a Bike	+ 3' 36"
3	Remco Evenepoel (BEL)	Red Bull–Bora–Hansgrohe	+ 4' 06"
4	Juan Ayuso (ESP)	Lidl–Trek	+ 4' 22"
5	Paul Seixas (FRA)	Decathlon CMA CGM	+ 4' 35"
6	Florian Lipowitz (GER)	Red Bull–Bora–Hansgrohe	+ 4' 44"
7	Isaac del Toro (MEX)	UAE Team Emirates XRG	+ 5' 08"
8	Mattias Skjelmose (DEN)	Lidl–Trek	+ 5' 45"
9	Lenny Martinez (FRA)	Team Bahrain Victorious	+ 6' 34"
10	Tom Pidcock (GBR)	Pinarello–Q36.5 Pro Cycling Team	+ 11' 49"

== Stage 11 ==
15 July 2026 – Vichy to Nevers, 161.3 km (100.2 mi)

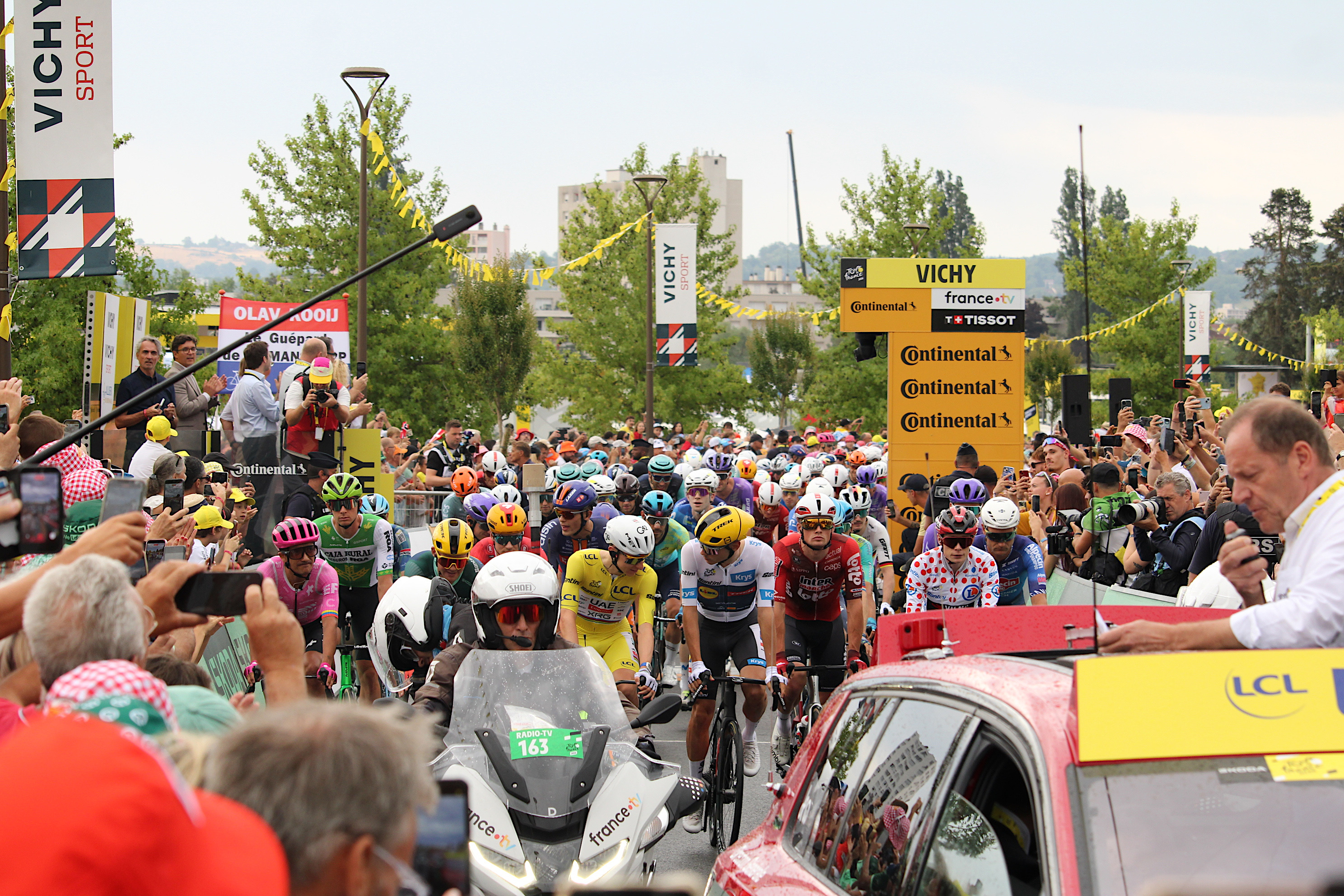
Neutralized start (départ fictif) of stage 11 in Vichy

The eleventh stage of the race headed north from Vichy to Nevers over a flat 161.3 km (100.2 mi) course with two fourth-category climbs.

A breakaway formed after 11 km (6.8 mi), with 4 riders including Mathis Le Berre (Team TotalEnergies), who later took maximum points at the intermediate sprint. Philipsen won the sprint for the remaining points from the peloton. The peloton didn't give the break much time, with a small lead of around 90 seconds throughout the stage. Despite a couple of crashes in the peloton, the break was reeled in with 6 km (3.7 mi) to the finish.

The sprint began with 2.2 km (1.4 mi) to go, however the finish was disorganised with the lead sprinters having to work for themselves. Amid the chaos, the Decathlon CMA CGM lead-out rider for Kooij – Cees Bol – had pushed on and gained a small lead over the pack. Søren Wærenskjold (Uno-X Mobility) took the opportunity to leap across to Bol and managed to take the stage victory over the pack of sprinters behind. Kooij was second, with Philipsen third.

The stage was the fastest ever road stage in the history of the Tour with an average speed of 50.9 kilometres per hour (31.6 mph).

Stage 11 result
Rank	Rider	Team	Time
1	Søren Wærenskjold (NOR)	Uno-X Mobility	3h 10' 06"
2	Olav Kooij (NED)	Decathlon CMA CGM	+ 0"
3	Jasper Philipsen (BEL)	Alpecin–Premier Tech	+ 0"
4	Milan Fretin (BEL)	Cofidis	+ 0"
5	Huub Artz (NED)	Lotto–Intermarché	+ 0"
6	Biniam Girmay (ERI)	NSN Cycling Team	+ 0"
7	Anthony Turgis (FRA)	Team TotalEnergies	+ 0"
8	Clément Russo (FRA)	Groupama–FDJ United	+ 0"
9	Fernando Gaviria (COL)	Caja Rural–Seguros RGA	+ 0"
10	Pascal Ackermann (GER)	Team Jayco–AlUla	+ 0"

General classification after stage 11
Rank	Rider	Team	Time
1	Tadej Pogačar (SLO)	UAE Team Emirates XRG	39h 25' 08"
2	Jonas Vingegaard (DEN)	Visma–Lease a Bike	+ 3' 36"
3	Remco Evenepoel (BEL)	Red Bull–Bora–Hansgrohe	+ 4' 06"
4	Juan Ayuso (ESP)	Lidl–Trek	+ 4' 22"
5	Paul Seixas (FRA)	Decathlon CMA CGM	+ 4' 35"
6	Florian Lipowitz (GER)	Red Bull–Bora–Hansgrohe	+ 4' 44"
7	Isaac del Toro (MEX)	UAE Team Emirates XRG	+ 5' 08"
8	Mattias Skjelmose (DEN)	Lidl–Trek	+ 5' 45"
9	Lenny Martinez (FRA)	Team Bahrain Victorious	+ 6' 34"
10	Tom Pidcock (GBR)	Pinarello–Q36.5 Pro Cycling Team	+ 11' 49"
