= Pogačar–Vingegaard rivalry =

Individual cycling rivalry

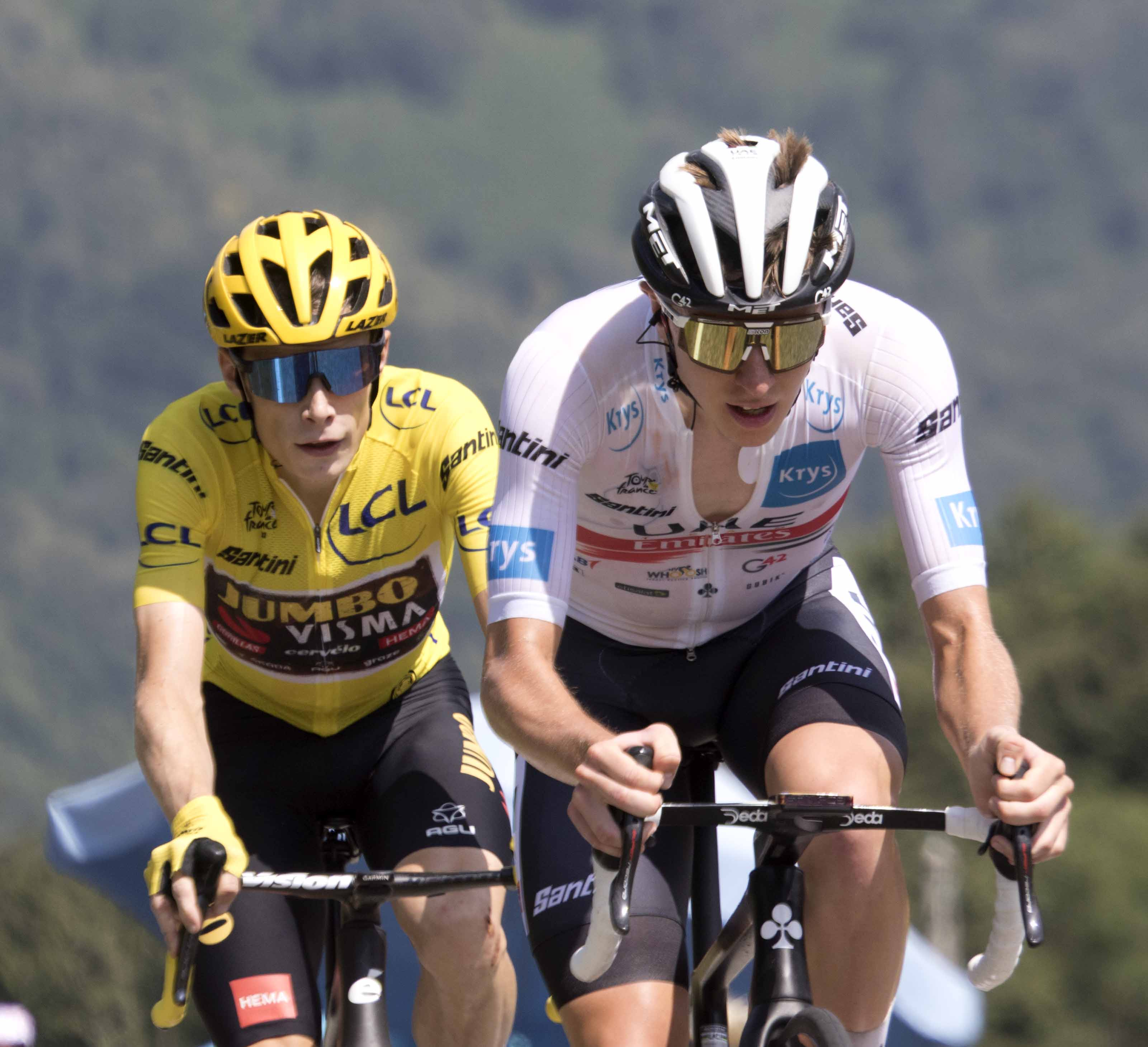
Pogačar (right) riding ahead of Vingegaard, who wears the yellow jersey during the 2022 Tour de France.

The Pogačar–Vingegaard rivalry is a sporting rivalry between Slovenian cyclist Tadej Pogačar and Danish cyclist Jonas Vingegaard. Their competition, particularly at the Tour de France, has become a defining narrative of road cycling in the 2020s, and is considered to be one of the greatest rivalries in the sport's history. The pair have collectively won seven Tour de France general classification titles—Pogačar in 2020, 2021, 2024, 2025 and 2026, Vingegaard in 2022 and 2023—finishing first and second on the podium in five consecutive years from 2021 to 2025.

Their rivalry is generally contained to stage races, such as the Grand Tours. In addition to their dominance over the Tour de France, Pogačar won the 2024 Giro d'Italia and Vingegaard won the 2025 Vuelta a España and 2026 Giro d'Italia. The pair have also had great success in UCI WorldTour one-week stage races during this period, with Pogačar winning ten and Vingegaard winning six from 2021–2026.

Their rivalry is often characterized by their contrasting racing styles: Pogačar is known for his aggressive and instinctive approach, often attacking from long distances, where Vingegaard is seen as more measured and trusting in his ability to win on long climbs to altitude. Their battles have pushed each rider and their teams to improve and adapt, resulting in performances that have been labeled as "lightyears ahead of the rest."

== Background ==
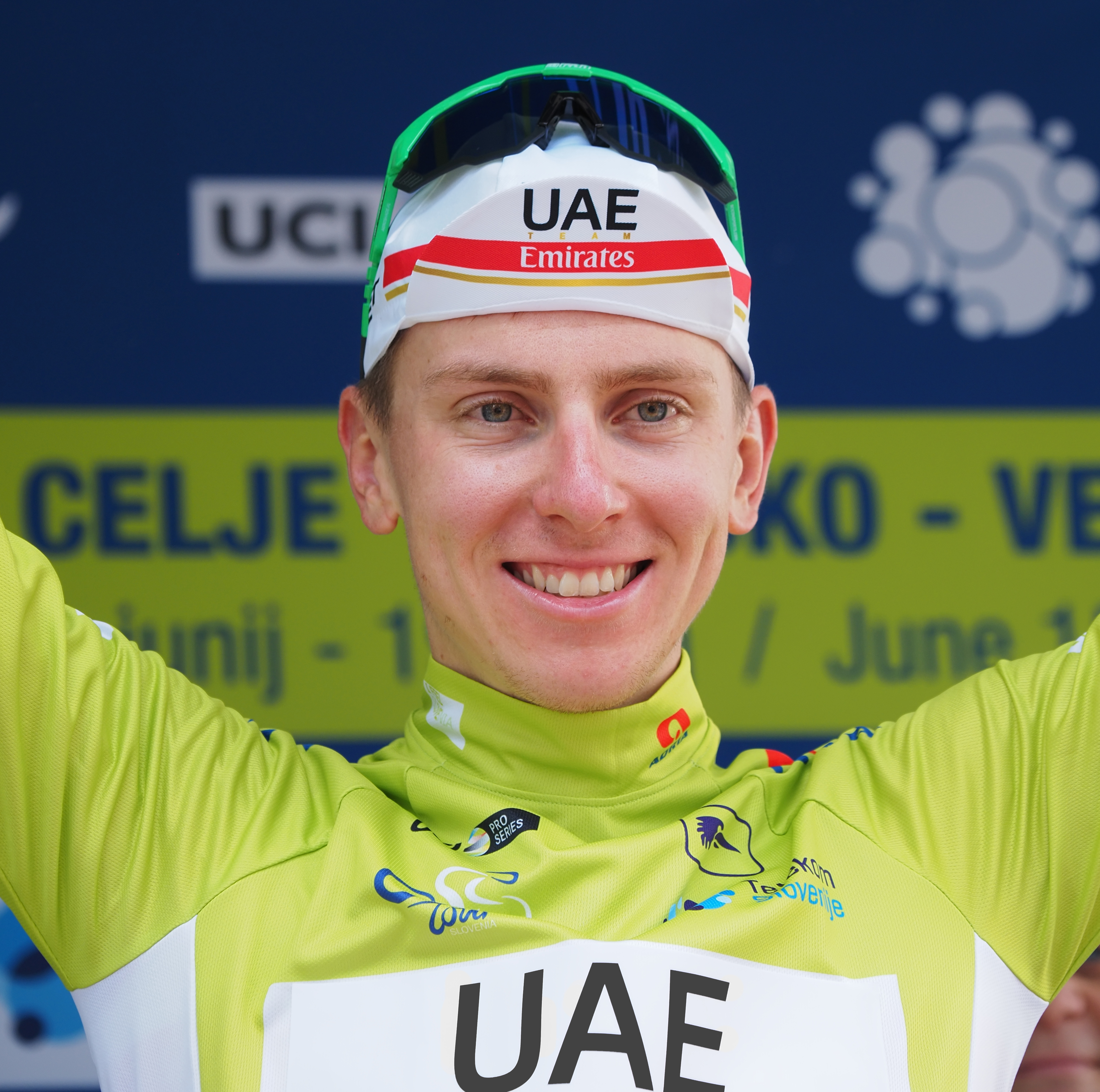
Pogačar at the 2022 Tour of Slovenia

=== Tadej Pogačar ===
Pogačar (born 21 September 1998) is a Slovenian professional cyclist who rides for UAE Team Emirates XRG. He started cycling at a young age, and was highly successful in the junior ranks. After becoming a professional in 2019, he became the youngest winner of a UCI WorldTour stage race after his victory at the Tour of California. In 2020, Pogačar won the Tour de France in his debut appearance, becoming the second youngest winner in the tour's history. He has been compared to legendary cyclists like Eddy Merckx and Bernard Hinault for his ability to compete across Grand Tours, one-day classics, and time trials.

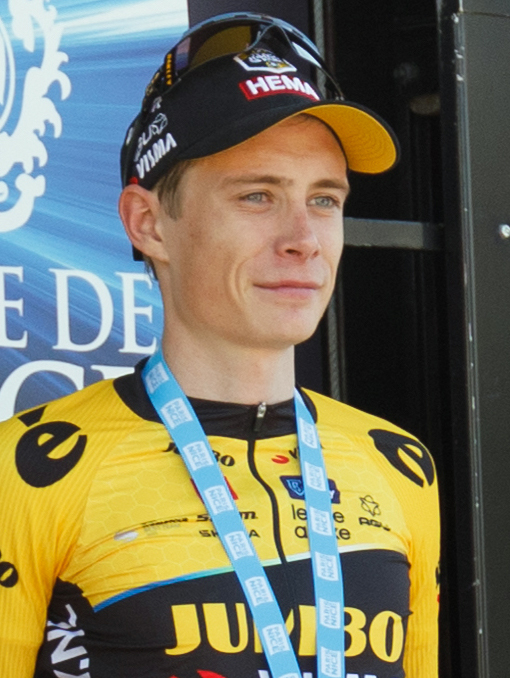
Vingegaard at the 2023 Paris-Nice

=== Jonas Vingegaard ===
Vingegaard (born 10 December 1996) is a Danish professional cyclist who rides for Visma–Lease a Bike. He initially struggled to secure a pro contract, and in 2016 worked at a fish factory while training with Danish continental Team ColoQuick–Cult. Vingegaard made the jump to UCI WorldTour level with Visma–Lease a Bike in 2019 (then known as Team Jumbo–Visma). Initially riding primarily as a domestique for Primož Roglič, Vingegaard was elevated to a team leader after Roglič's crash in the 2021 Tour de France, where Vingegaard finished second overall. Vingegaard is known for his climbing ability, particularly on long, difficult climbs and at high altitude.

== Rivalry ==
=== Early years ===
Pogačar and Vingegaard first shared the road in 2018 at the Course de la Paix U23 – Grand Prix Jeseníky in the Czech Republic, which Pogačar won with the Slovenian national team. Their first race together as professionals was the 2019 Tour of the Basque Country, where Pogačar finished 6th overall and won the youth classification. Vingegaard, riding as a domestique and not yet widely known, finished 32nd overall.

The rider's first significant match up came at the 2021 Tour of the Basque Country where Vingegaard finished second overall ahead of Pogačar in third. Vingegaard's team leader Primož Roglič won the race, while Vingegaard took the young rider's jersey. Much of the media coverage of the race focused on the team strength of Jumbo-Visma, and how Vingegaard's assistance would help the expected duel of Roglič and Pogačar at the upcoming Tour de France.

=== 2021 Tour de France ===
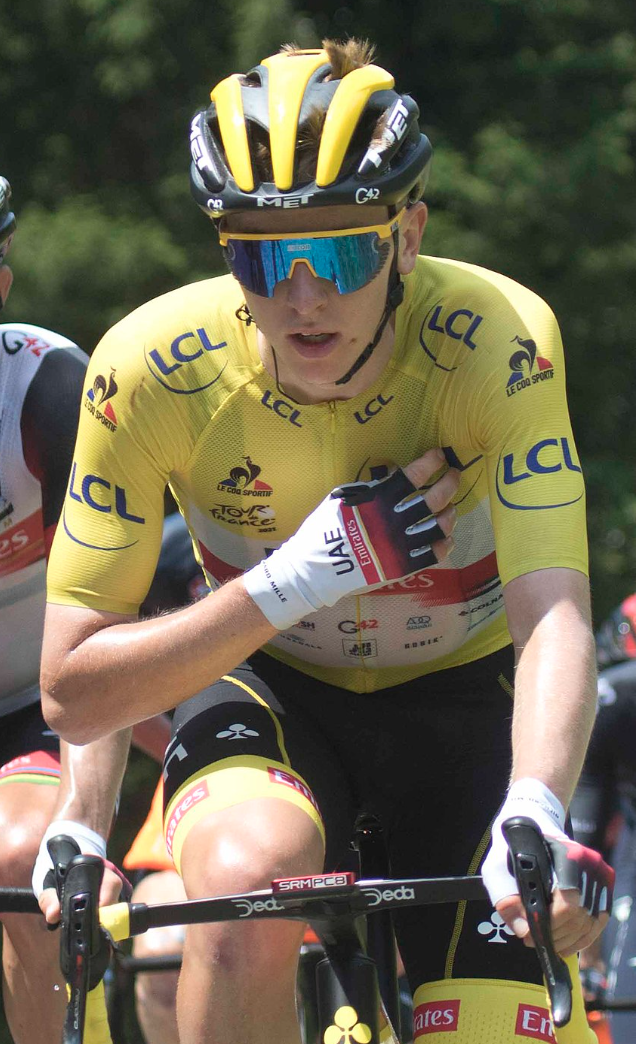
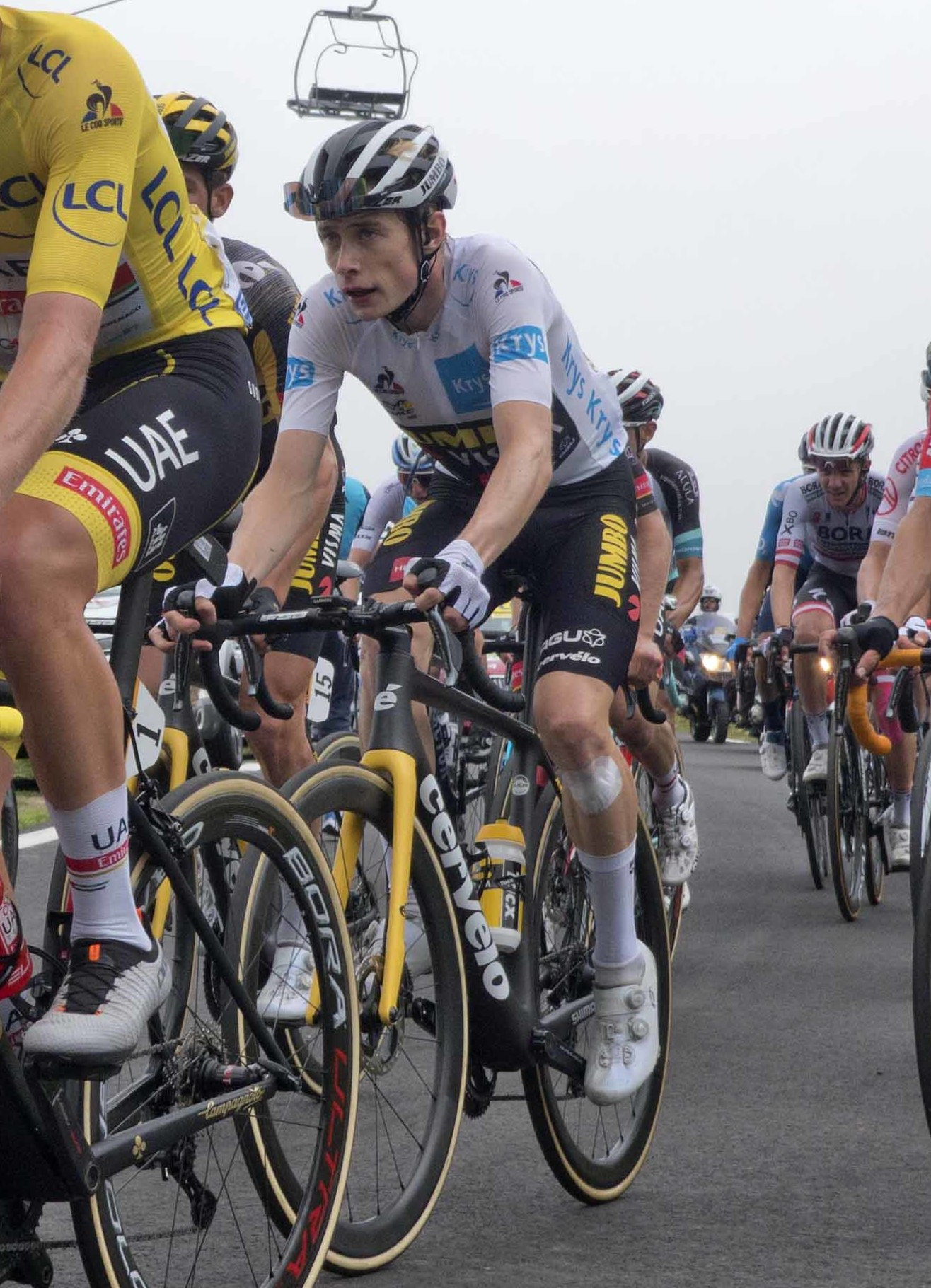
Pogačar (left) and Vingegaard riding in the 2021 Tour de France

Pogačar entered the race as the reigning champion and one of the primary favorites, where Vingegaard was expected to ride as a domestique for team leader Primož Roglič. However, Roglič crashed heavily on stage 3, losing significant time, and would abandon the race after stage 8. Vingegaard, at this point in fifth overall, took over as Team Jumbo–Visma's only general classification contendor. Pogačar was in the lead of the race, having won the stage 5 time trial and dominated on the stage 8 climb to Le Grand-Bornand.

On stage 11, which featured two climbs of the iconic Mount Ventoux, Vingegaard attacked from the leaders group. Pogačar was briefly able to follow, but cracked and Vingegaard was able to gain a 30-second advantage by the top of the climb. Pogačar's group ultimately caught up to Vingegaard before the end of the descent finish, and there were no time gaps, but media coverage focused closely on this attack as the first time Pogačar had showed weakness throughout the race.

In the third week, Pogačar won back-to-back mountain stages on stage 17 and 18, out-sprinting Vingegaard on both days. Vingegaard moved up into 2nd overall, which he would solidify with a third place finish in the penultimate stage time trial. Although Pogačar won the final general classification by over 5 minutes, Vingegaard was credited as his main challenger, and the only rider to crack Pogačar on a climb.

=== 2022 Tour de France ===
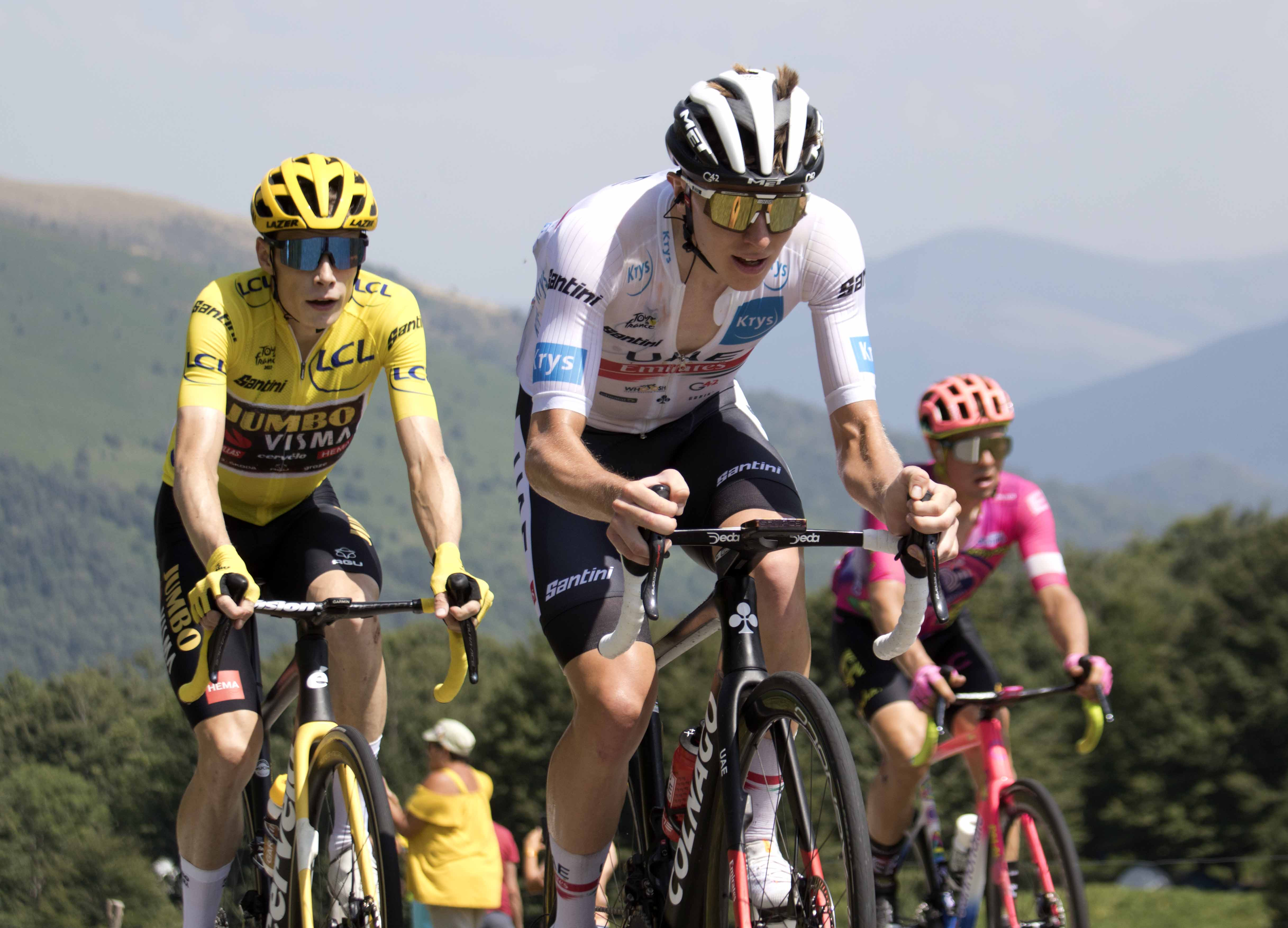
Vingegaard following Pogačar during the 2022 Tour de France

Pogačar was again the favorite entering the race, with Vingegaard and Roglič entering as co-leaders and considered by oddsmakers as the other top contenders. The race started in Denmark, Vingegaard's home country, for the first time. Pogačar took the yellow jersey with wins on stages 6 and 7, and lead Vingegaard by 39 seconds after stage 10. On stage 11, Vingegaard and Roglič worked together to repeatedly attack Pogačar on the Col du Galibier, tiring him before the final climb of the Col du Granon. Vingegaard attacked 5 km from the finish, winning the stage and taking nearly 3 minutes on Pogačar. Patrick Fletcher of CyclingNews called it one of "the most dramatic days in the rich history of the race."

Pogačar attacked Vingegaard repeatedly over the following stages, including winning stage 17 to gain 4 bonus seconds, but Vingegaard was able to defend his race lead. Vingegaard won stage 18 to Hautacam, and finished in Paris with a 2 minutes and 43 seconds.

=== 2023 Tour de France ===
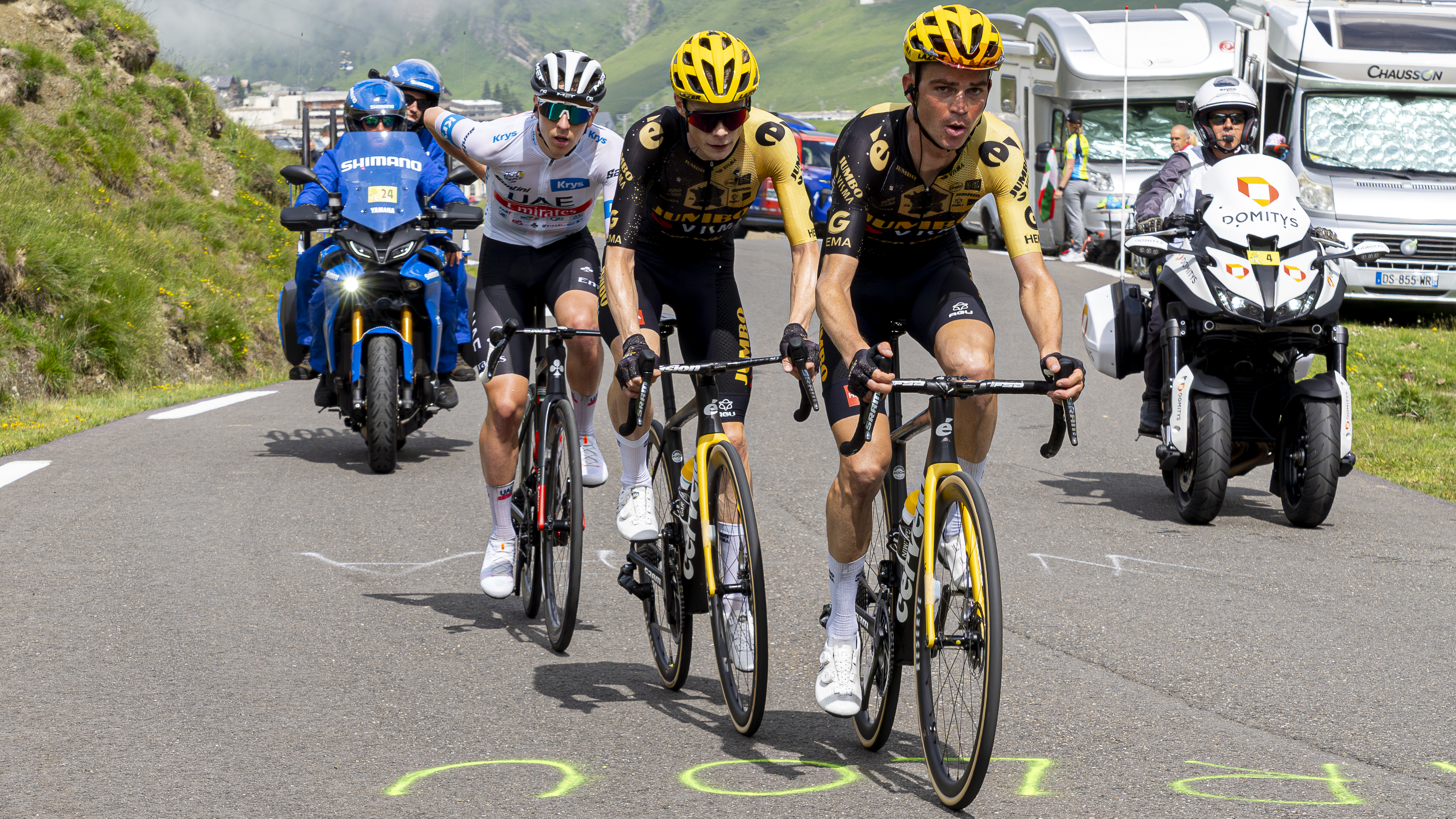
Pogačar (left) riding behind Vingegaard (center) and Sepp Kuss during the 2023 Tour de France

Pogačar and Vingegaard were considered joint-favorites coming into the 2023 edition. Pogačar had been the stronger of the pair at Paris-Nice in March, but suffered a fractured wrist at Liège–Bastogne–Liège, missing several weeks of training before the Tour.

Vingegaard took the race lead after stage six, but the riders remained closely matched for the first two weeks, with just 10 seconds separating them in the general classification heading into the stage 16 individual time trial. Vingegaard won the time trial in dominant fashion, gaining nearly two minutes on Pogačar. The next day, Pogačar cracked on the Col de la Loze, telling his team "I'm gone, I'm dead" 8 kilometres (5.0 mi) from the summit, ultimately losing six minutes. Vingegaard maintained his lead to win the race, with Pogačar finishing second for the second consecutive year.

=== 2024 Tour de France ===
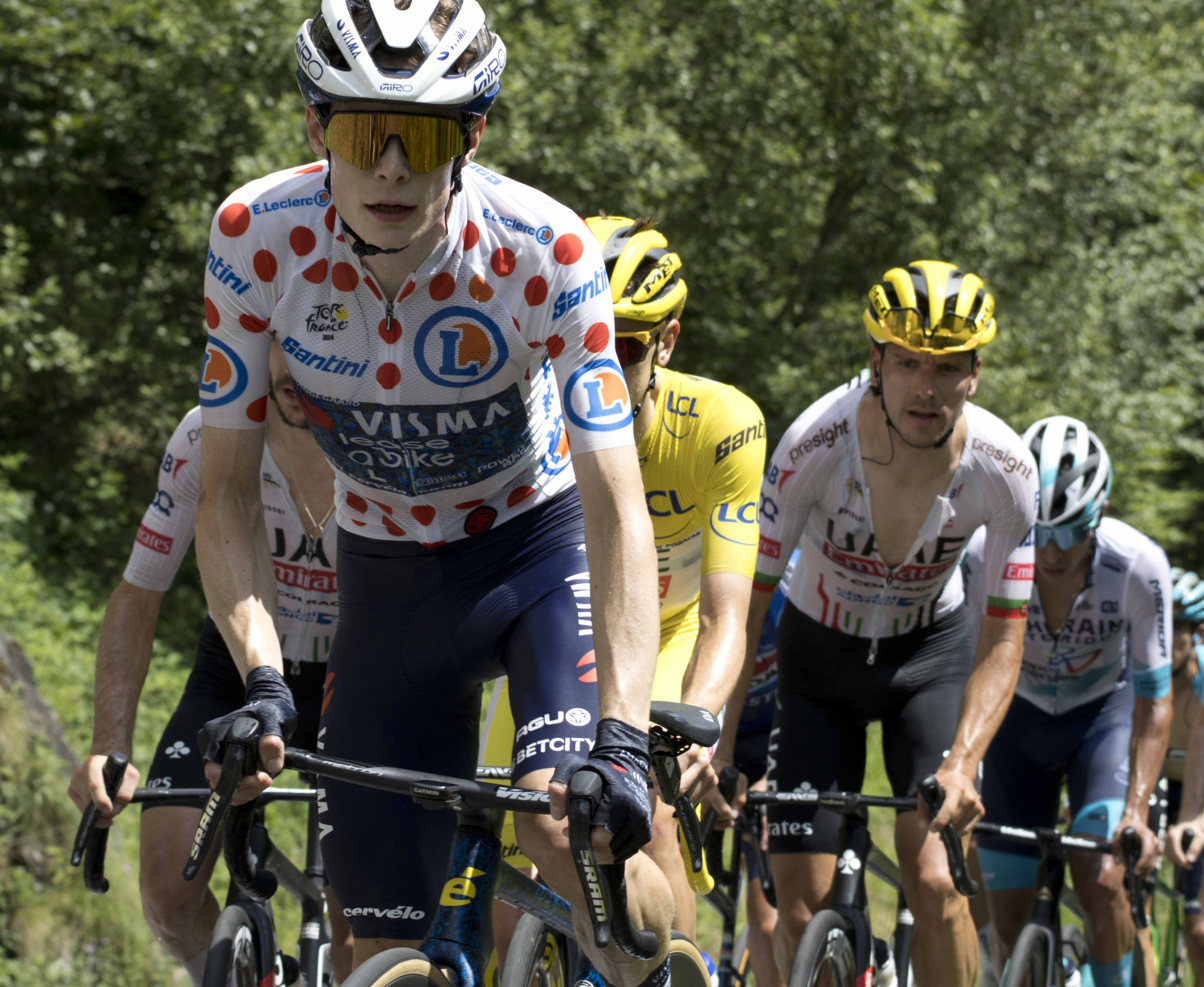
Vingegaard wearing the polka dot jersey during the 2024 Tour de France, followed by Pogačar and his teammates

Two months before the 2024 Tour, Vingegaard was involved in a serious crash on stage 4 of the Tour of the Basque Country, suffering a collapsed lung and multiple broken bones. His injuries meant his missed all his planned preparation races for the Tour, but was still considered among the favorites for the race. Pogačar chose to ride the Giro d'Italia for the first time, where he won six stages and the general classification by nearly ten minutes.

Pogačar took the race lead after the second stage and was dominant throughout the race, finishing with six stage wins. Vingegaard, who beat Pogačar in a two-man sprint to win stage 11, finished second, six minutes and 17 seconds down.

== Racing styles ==
Pogačar is seen as a more instinctive, aggressive racer, a return to an earlier era of cycling with long-range attacks. Vingegaard is more conservative and strategic. Pogačar is also considered a more all-around rider, as he is highly successful in one-day classics, winning the 2024 UCI Road World Championships road race and multiple Monuments. Vingegaard has been described as "born to climb" due to his physique, and is often credited as strongest on long, steep climbs. Prior to the 2025 Tour de France, Pogačar himself called Vingegaard "the best climber in the world."

== Head-to-head statistics ==
Updated through the 2025 Tour de France

Tour de France results
Year	Winner	Runner-up	Time gap
2021	(Slovenia) Pogačar	(Denmark) Vingegaard	5:20
2022	(Denmark) Vingegaard	(Slovenia) Pogačar	2:43
2023	(Denmark) Vingegaard	(Slovenia) Pogačar	7:29
2024	(Slovenia) Pogačar	(Denmark) Vingegaard	6:17
2025	(Slovenia) Pogačar	(Denmark) Vingegaard	4:24

Statistical comparison
Achievement	Pogačar	Vingegaard
Tour de France GC	4	2
TdF runner-up	2	3
TdF mountains classification	3	1
TdF stage wins	21	4
Yellow jerseys	54	27

At the end of the 2024 Tour de France, after over 13,000 kilometers and 328 hours of racing, Pogačar and Vingegaard were only separated by three seconds on the road (not counting bonus seconds).

== Legacy and impact on cycling ==
The Pogačar–Vingegaard rivalry has been compared by sports media to other iconic cycling rivalries like Jacques Anquetil and Raymond Poulidor, Fausto Coppi and Gino Bartali, or Bernard Hinault and Greg LeMond. In 2023, Lawrence Ostlere of The Independent called it "one of the great rivalries of modern cycling,", and cycling service FloBikes called it "the biggest rivalry in the sport" The rivalry is most regarded for the pair's competition at the Tour de France, which has been called "the most sustained" and "one of the Tour's most longstanding" rivalries. In 2024, they took the top two podium spots for a record fourth consecutive Tour (later extending this record in 2025).

Their rivalry has been compared to "the space race" by Barry Ryan of CyclingNews, as the two riders and their teams have pushed one another to improve over the years. This dynamic has resulted in notable developments in team tactics, and key rider acquisitions by both teams Visma–Lease a Bike and UAE Team Emirates XRG. Pogačar's loss in 2023 specifically inspired him to overhaul his training and race approach, as he planned a longer offseason and raced more conservatively to save his energy for the Tour de France. Their rivalry has even been credited with changing the overall trends of the sport; media sources have speculated top riders have skipped the Tour to avoid facing Pogačar and Vingegaard, and tactics change at races where neither rider is present.

Both riders have commented on the historic nature of the rivalry: in a 2023 interview, Pogačar said the rivalry "will go in the history books," and that he is "really happy to have such a rival against me." Following the 2024 Tour de France, Vingegaard commented to reporters about the rivalry: "I think it's good for cycling, it's good for me, it's good for Tadej. We challenge each other. We make each other better."

== See also ==
- Tour de France
- List of sports rivalries
- Van Aert–Van der Poel rivalry
