= Hillerslev =

- Village
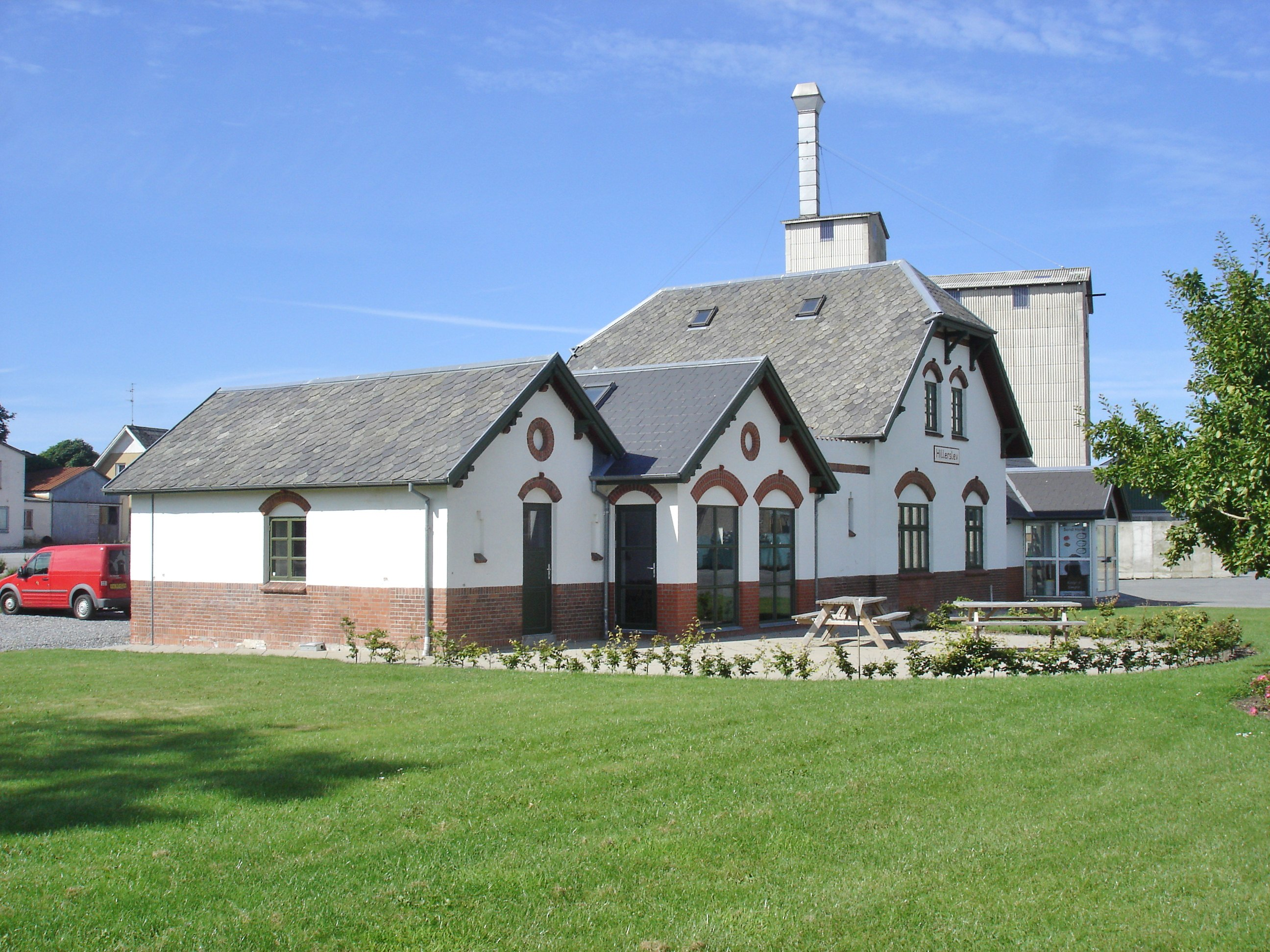
- Former station building

- Location within North Jutland Region
- Coordinates: 57°0′44″N 8°43′41″E
- Country: Denmark
- Region: North Jutland (Nordjylland)
- Municipality: Thisted

Population (2026)
  - Urban: 361

Hillerslev is a village in Thy (district), northwestern Jutland in the Thisted Municipality, in North Jutland Region. As of 1 January 2026, it has a population of 361. It is located 16 kilometers southeast of Hanstholm, 37 km west of Fjerritslev and 7 km north of Thisted.

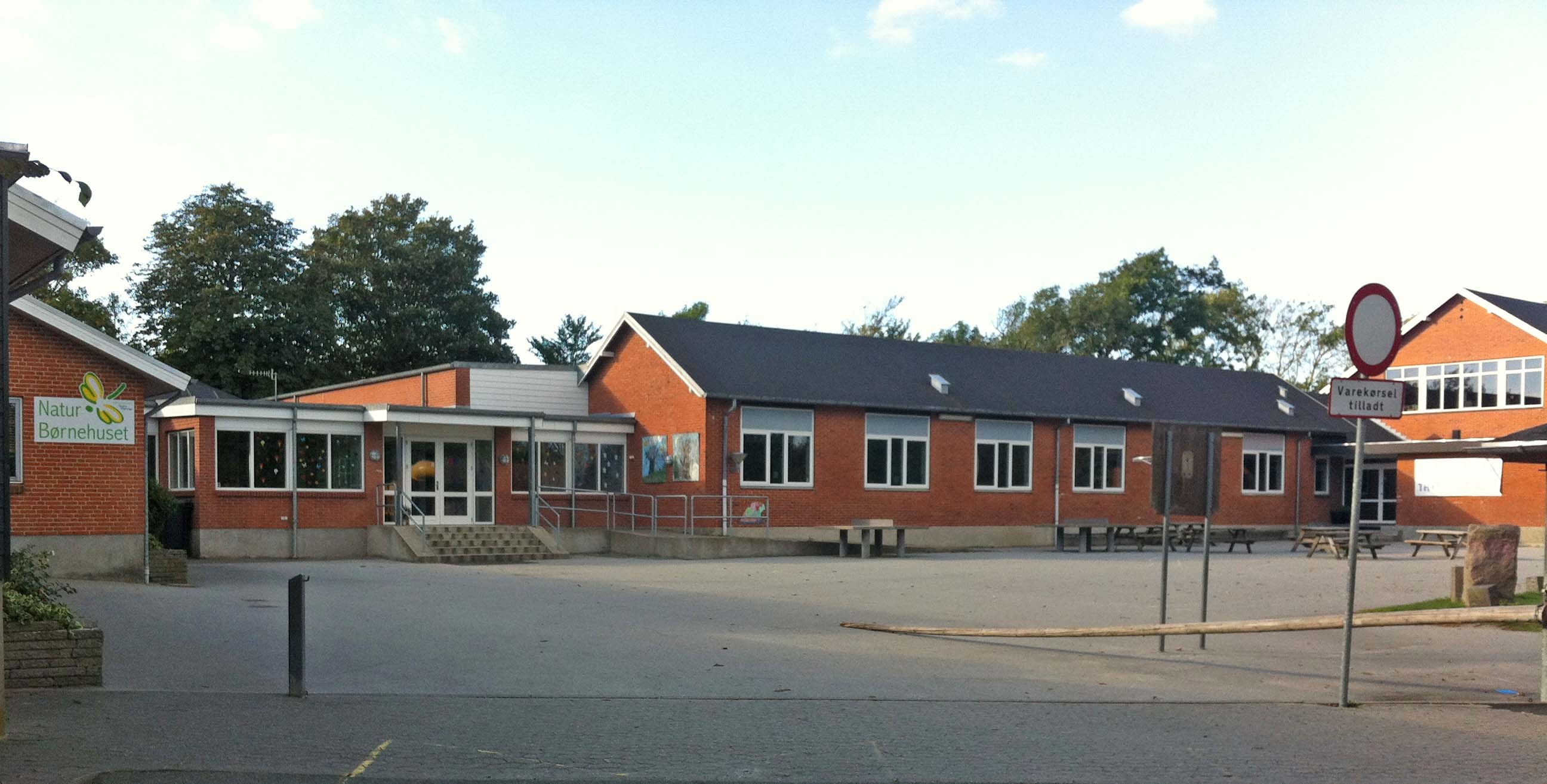
The Hillerslev school

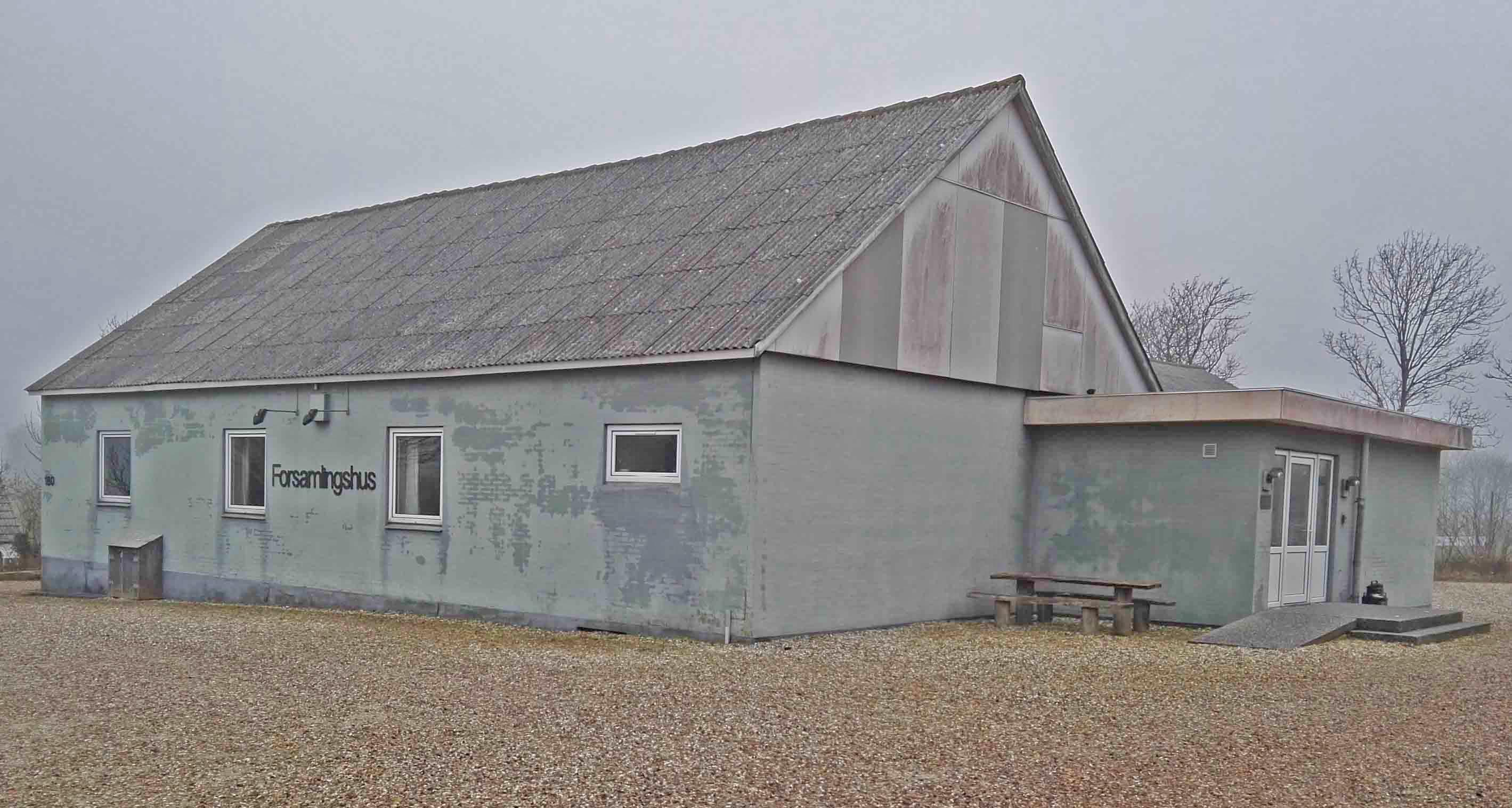
Village hall

Two time Tour de France winner Jonas Vingegaard was born in Hillerslev.
