= 2023 Vuelta a España, Stage 12 to Stage 21 =

Vuelta a España stages (cycling)

The 2023 Vuelta a España is the 78th edition of Vuelta a España, one of cycling's Grand Tours. The Vuelta began in Barcelona on 26 August, and Stage 12 from Ólvega to Zaragoza will occur on 7 September. The race will finish in Madrid on 17 September.

== Classification standings ==
Legend
Denotes the leader of the general classification	Denotes the leader of the young rider classification
Denotes the leader of the points classification	Denotes the leader of the team classification
Denotes the leader of the mountains classification	Denotes the winner of the combativity award

== Stage 12 ==
7 September 2023 – Ólvega to Zaragoza, 151 km (94 mi)

Stage 12 result
Rank	Rider	Team	Time
1	Juan Sebastián Molano (COL)	UAE Team Emirates	3h 23' 35"
2	Kaden Groves (AUS)	Alpecin–Deceuninck	+ 0"
3	Boy van Poppel (NED)	Intermarché–Circus–Wanty	+ 0"
4	Rui Oliveira (POR)	UAE Team Emirates	+ 0"
5	Edward Theuns (BEL)	Lidl–Trek	+ 0"
6	Marijn van den Berg (NED)	EF Education–EasyPost	+ 0"
7	Alberto Dainese (ITA)	Team DSM–Firmenich	+ 0"
8	Orluis Aular (VEN)	Caja Rural–Seguros RGA	+ 0"
9	Hugo Page (FRA)	Intermarché–Circus–Wanty	+ 0"
10	Milan Menten (BEL)	Lotto–Dstny	+ 0"

General classification after stage 12
Rank	Rider	Team	Time
1	Sepp Kuss (USA)	Team Jumbo–Visma	42h 51' 20"
2	Marc Soler (ESP)	UAE Team Emirates	+ 26"
3	Remco Evenepoel (BEL)	Soudal–Quick-Step	+ 1' 09"
4	Primož Roglič (SLO)	Team Jumbo–Visma	+ 1' 32"
5	Lenny Martinez (FRA)	Groupama–FDJ	+ 2' 02"
6	João Almeida (POR)	UAE Team Emirates	+ 2' 16"
7	Jonas Vingegaard (DEN)	Team Jumbo–Visma	+ 2' 22"
8	Juan Ayuso (ESP)	UAE Team Emirates	+ 2' 25"
9	Enric Mas (ESP)	Movistar Team	+ 2' 50"
10	Aleksandr Vlasov	Bora–Hansgrohe	+ 3' 14"

== Stage 13 ==
8 September 2023 – Formigal to Col du Tourmalet (France), 135 km (84 mi)

Stage 13 result
Rank	Rider	Team	Time
1	Jonas Vingegaard (DEN)	Team Jumbo–Visma	3h 51' 10"
2	Sepp Kuss (USA)	Team Jumbo–Visma	+ 30"
3	Primož Roglič (SLO)	Team Jumbo–Visma	+ 33"
4	Juan Ayuso (ESP)	UAE Team Emirates	+ 38"
5	Cian Uijtdebroeks (BEL)	Bora–Hansgrohe	+ 38"
6	Enric Mas (ESP)	Movistar Team	+ 40"
7	Mikel Landa (ESP)	Team Bahrain Victorious	+ 1' 15"
8	Aleksandr Vlasov	Bora–Hansgrohe	+ 2' 12"
9	Steff Cras (BEL)	Team TotalEnergies	+ 2' 32"
10	Marc Soler (ESP)	UAE Team Emirates	+ 3' 08"

General classification after stage 13
Rank	Rider	Team	Time
1	Sepp Kuss (USA)	Team Jumbo–Visma	46h 42' 54"
2	Primož Roglič (SLO)	Team Jumbo–Visma	+ 1' 37"
3	Jonas Vingegaard (DEN)	Team Jumbo–Visma	+ 1' 44"
4	Juan Ayuso (ESP)	UAE Team Emirates	+ 2' 37"
5	Enric Mas (ESP)	Movistar Team	+ 3' 06"
6	Marc Soler (ESP)	UAE Team Emirates	+ 3' 10"
7	Mikel Landa (ESP)	Team Bahrain Victorious	+ 4' 12"
8	Aleksandr Vlasov	Bora–Hansgrohe	+ 5' 02"
9	Cian Uijtdebroeks (BEL)	Bora–Hansgrohe	+ 5' 30"
10	João Almeida (POR)	UAE Team Emirates	+ 8' 39"

== Stage 14 ==
9 September 2023 – Sauveterre-de-Béarn (France) to Larra-Belagua, 156.5 km (97.2 mi)

Stage 14 result
Rank	Rider	Team	Time
1	Remco Evenepoel (BEL)	Soudal–Quick-Step	4h 13' 38"
2	Romain Bardet (FRA)	Team DSM–Firmenich	+ 1' 12"
3	Lennert Van Eetvelt (BEL)	Lotto–Dstny	+ 6' 33"
4	Jonathan Castroviejo (ESP)	Ineos Grenadiers	+ 6' 35"
5	Michael Storer (AUS)	Groupama–FDJ	+ 7' 24"
6	David de la Cruz (ESP)	Astana Qazaqstan Team	+ 8' 21"
7	Aleksandr Vlasov	Bora–Hansgrohe	+ 8' 22"
8	Sepp Kuss (USA)	Team Jumbo–Visma	+ 8' 22"
9	Wout Poels (NED)	Team Bahrain Victorious	+ 8' 22"
10	Juan Ayuso (ESP)	UAE Team Emirates	+ 8' 22"

General classification after stage 14
Rank	Rider	Team	Time
1	Sepp Kuss (USA)	Team Jumbo–Visma	51h 04' 54"
2	Primož Roglič (SLO)	Team Jumbo–Visma	+ 1' 37"
3	Jonas Vingegaard (DEN)	Team Jumbo–Visma	+ 1' 44"
4	Juan Ayuso (ESP)	UAE Team Emirates	+ 2' 37"
5	Enric Mas (ESP)	Movistar Team	+ 3' 06"
6	Marc Soler (ESP)	UAE Team Emirates	+ 3' 10"
7	Mikel Landa (ESP)	Team Bahrain Victorious	+ 4' 12"
8	Aleksandr Vlasov	Bora–Hansgrohe	+ 5' 02"
9	Cian Uijtdebroeks (BEL)	Bora–Hansgrohe	+ 5' 30"
10	João Almeida (POR)	UAE Team Emirates	+ 8' 39"

== Stage 15 ==
10 September 2023 – Pamplona to Lekunberri, 158.5 km (98.5 mi)

Stage 15 result
Rank	Rider	Team	Time
1	Rui Costa (POR)	Intermarché–Circus–Wanty	3h 30' 56"
2	Lennard Kämna (GER)	Bora–Hansgrohe	+ 0"
3	Santiago Buitrago (COL)	Team Bahrain Victorious	+ 0"
4	Remco Evenepoel (BEL)	Soudal–Quick-Step	+ 2"
5	Andreas Kron (DEN)	Lotto–Dstny	+ 2"
6	Einer Rubio (COL)	Movistar Team	+ 2"
7	Cristián Rodríguez (ESP)	Arkéa–Samsic	+ 2"
8	Chris Hamilton (AUS)	Team DSM–Firmenich	+ 2"
9	Nico Denz (GER)	Bora–Hansgrohe	+ 36"
10	Jimmy Janssens (BEL)	Alpecin–Deceuninck	+ 1' 07"

General classification after stage 15
Rank	Rider	Team	Time
1	Sepp Kuss (USA)	Team Jumbo–Visma	54h 38' 42"
2	Primož Roglič (SLO)	Team Jumbo–Visma	+ 1' 37"
3	Jonas Vingegaard (DEN)	Team Jumbo–Visma	+ 1' 44"
4	Juan Ayuso (ESP)	UAE Team Emirates	+ 2' 37"
5	Enric Mas (ESP)	Movistar Team	+ 3' 06"
6	Marc Soler (ESP)	UAE Team Emirates	+ 3' 10"
7	Mikel Landa (ESP)	Team Bahrain Victorious	+ 4' 12"
8	Aleksandr Vlasov	Bora–Hansgrohe	+ 5' 02"
9	Cian Uijtdebroeks (BEL)	Bora–Hansgrohe	+ 5' 30"
10	João Almeida (POR)	UAE Team Emirates	+ 8' 39"

== Rest day 2 ==
11 September 2023 – Santander

== Stage 16 ==
12 September 2023 – Liencres Playa to Bejes, 120.5 km (74.9 mi)

Stage 16 result
Rank	Rider	Team	Time
1	Jonas Vingegaard (DEN)	Team Jumbo–Visma	2h 38' 23"
2	Finn Fisher-Black (NZL)	UAE Team Emirates	+ 43"
3	Wout Poels (NED)	Team Bahrain Victorious	+ 49"
4	Michael Storer (AUS)	Groupama–FDJ	+ 55"
5	Juan Ayuso (ESP)	UAE Team Emirates	+ 1' 01"
6	Enric Mas (ESP)	Movistar Team	+ 1' 01"
7	Aleksandr Vlasov	Bora–Hansgrohe	+ 1' 01"
8	Primož Roglič (SLO)	Team Jumbo–Visma	+ 1' 01"
9	Mikel Landa (ESP)	Team Bahrain Victorious	+ 1' 05"
10	Sepp Kuss (USA)	Team Jumbo–Visma	+ 1' 05"

General classification after stage 16
Rank	Rider	Team	Time
1	Sepp Kuss (USA)	Team Jumbo–Visma	57h 18' 10"
2	Jonas Vingegaard (DEN)	Team Jumbo–Visma	+ 29"
3	Primož Roglič (SLO)	Team Jumbo–Visma	+ 1' 33"
4	Juan Ayuso (ESP)	UAE Team Emirates	+ 2' 33"
5	Enric Mas (ESP)	Movistar Team	+ 3' 02"
6	Marc Soler (ESP)	UAE Team Emirates	+ 3' 28"
7	Mikel Landa (ESP)	Team Bahrain Victorious	+ 4' 12"
8	Aleksandr Vlasov	Bora–Hansgrohe	+ 4' 58"
9	Cian Uijtdebroeks (BEL)	Bora–Hansgrohe	+ 5' 38"
10	João Almeida (POR)	UAE Team Emirates	+ 8' 43"

== Stage 17 ==
13 September 2023 – Ribadesella to Alto de L'Angliru, 120.5 km (74.9 mi)

Stage 17 result
Rank	Rider	Team	Time
1	Primož Roglič (SLO)	Team Jumbo–Visma	3h 15' 56"
2	Jonas Vingegaard (DEN)	Team Jumbo–Visma	+ 0"
3	Sepp Kuss (USA)	Team Jumbo–Visma	+ 19"
4	Mikel Landa (ESP)	Team Bahrain Victorious	+ 19"
5	Wout Poels (NED)	Team Bahrain Victorious	+ 44"
6	João Almeida (POR)	UAE Team Emirates	+ 58"
7	Cian Uijtdebroeks (BEL)	Bora–Hansgrohe	+ 1' 20"
8	Santiago Buitrago (COL)	Team Bahrain Victorious	+ 1' 20"
9	Juan Ayuso (ESP)	UAE Team Emirates	+ 1' 42"
10	Enric Mas (ESP)	Movistar Team	+ 1' 43"

General classification after stage 17
Rank	Rider	Team	Time
1	Sepp Kuss (USA)	Team Jumbo–Visma	60h 34' 21"
2	Jonas Vingegaard (DEN)	Team Jumbo–Visma	+ 8"
3	Primož Roglič (SLO)	Team Jumbo–Visma	+ 1' 08"
4	Juan Ayuso (ESP)	UAE Team Emirates	+ 4' 00"
5	Mikel Landa (ESP)	Team Bahrain Victorious	+ 4' 16"
6	Enric Mas (ESP)	Movistar Team	+ 4' 30"
7	Cian Uijtdebroeks (BEL)	Bora–Hansgrohe	+ 6' 43"
8	Aleksandr Vlasov	Bora–Hansgrohe	+ 7' 38"
9	João Almeida (POR)	UAE Team Emirates	+ 9' 26"
10	Santiago Buitrago (COL)	Team Bahrain Victorious	+ 11' 26"

== Stage 18 ==
14 September 2023 – Pola de Allande to La Cruz de Linares, 179 km (111 mi)

Stage 18 result
Rank	Rider	Team	Time
1	Remco Evenepoel (BEL)	Soudal–Quick-Step	4h 47' 37"
2	Damiano Caruso (ITA)	Team Bahrain Victorious	+ 4' 44"
3	Andreas Kron (DEN)	Lotto–Dstny	+ 5' 10"
4	Max Poole (GBR)	Team DSM–Firmenich	+ 5' 12"
5	Paul Ourselin (FRA)	Team TotalEnergies	+ 5' 17"
6	Julien Bernard (FRA)	Lidl–Trek	+ 6' 11"
7	Egan Bernal (COL)	Ineos Grenadiers	+ 7' 01"
8	Juan Ayuso (ESP)	UAE Team Emirates	+ 9' 29"
9	Enric Mas (ESP)	Movistar Team	+ 9' 29"
10	Sepp Kuss (USA)	Team Jumbo–Visma	+ 9' 29"

General classification after stage 18
Rank	Rider	Team	Time
1	Sepp Kuss (USA)	Team Jumbo–Visma	65h 31' 27"
2	Jonas Vingegaard (DEN)	Team Jumbo–Visma	+ 17"
3	Primož Roglič (SLO)	Team Jumbo–Visma	+ 1' 08"
4	Juan Ayuso (ESP)	UAE Team Emirates	+ 4' 00"
5	Mikel Landa (ESP)	Team Bahrain Victorious	+ 4' 19"
6	Enric Mas (ESP)	Movistar Team	+ 4' 30"
7	Cian Uijtdebroeks (BEL)	Bora–Hansgrohe	+ 7' 37"
8	Aleksandr Vlasov	Bora–Hansgrohe	+ 8' 35"
9	João Almeida (POR)	UAE Team Emirates	+ 10' 20"
10	Santiago Buitrago (COL)	Team Bahrain Victorious	+ 12' 20"

== Stage 19 ==
15 September 2023 – La Bañeza to Íscar, 177.5 km (110.3 mi)

Stage 19 result
Rank	Rider	Team	Time
1	Alberto Dainese (ITA)	Team DSM–Firmenich	3h 42' 09"
2	Filippo Ganna (ITA)	Ineos Grenadiers	+ 0"
3	Marijn van den Berg (NED)	EF Education–EasyPost	+ 0"
4	Davide Cimolai (ITA)	Cofidis	+ 0"
5	Iván García Cortina (ESP)	Movistar Team	+ 0"
6	Maurice Ballerstedt (GER)	Alpecin–Deceuninck	+ 0"
7	Lewis Askey (GBR)	Groupama–FDJ	+ 0"
8	Hugo Hofstetter (FRA)	Arkéa–Samsic	+ 0"
9	Fernando Barceló (ESP)	Caja Rural–Seguros RGA	+ 0"
10	Jonas Koch (GER)	Bora–Hansgrohe	+ 0"

General classification after stage 19
Rank	Rider	Team	Time
1	Sepp Kuss (USA)	Team Jumbo–Visma	69h 14' 04"
2	Jonas Vingegaard (DEN)	Team Jumbo–Visma	+ 17"
3	Primož Roglič (SLO)	Team Jumbo–Visma	+ 1' 08"
4	Juan Ayuso (ESP)	UAE Team Emirates	+ 4' 00"
5	Mikel Landa (ESP)	Team Bahrain Victorious	+ 4' 19"
6	Enric Mas (ESP)	Movistar Team	+ 4' 30"
7	Cian Uijtdebroeks (BEL)	Bora–Hansgrohe	+ 7' 37"
8	Aleksandr Vlasov	Bora–Hansgrohe	+ 8' 35"
9	João Almeida (POR)	UAE Team Emirates	+ 10' 20"
10	Santiago Buitrago (COL)	Team Bahrain Victorious	+ 12' 20"

== Stage 20 ==
16 September 2023 – Manzanares el Real to Guadarrama, 208 km (129 mi)

Stage 20 result
Rank	Rider	Team	Time
1	Wout Poels (NED)	Team Bahrain Victorious	4h 59' 29"
2	Remco Evenepoel (BEL)	Soudal–Quick-Step	+ 0"
3	Pelayo Sánchez (ESP)	Burgos BH	+ 0"
4	Lennert Van Eetvelt (BEL)	Lotto–Dstny	+ 0"
5	Marc Soler (ESP)	UAE Team Emirates	+ 4"
6	Rui Costa (POR)	Intermarché–Circus–Wanty	+ 26"
7	Antonio Tiberi (ITA)	Team Bahrain Victorious	+ 26"
8	Lennard Kämna (GER)	Bora–Hansgrohe	+ 26"
9	Romain Bardet (FRA)	Team DSM–Firmenich	+ 26"
10	Einer Rubio (COL)	Movistar Team	+ 26"

General classification after stage 20
Rank	Rider	Team	Time
1	Sepp Kuss (USA)	Team Jumbo–Visma	74h 23' 42"
2	Jonas Vingegaard (DEN)	Team Jumbo–Visma	+ 17"
3	Primož Roglič (SLO)	Team Jumbo–Visma	+ 1' 08"
4	Juan Ayuso (ESP)	UAE Team Emirates	+ 3' 44"
5	Mikel Landa (ESP)	Team Bahrain Victorious	+ 4' 03"
6	Enric Mas (ESP)	Movistar Team	+ 4' 14"
7	Aleksandr Vlasov	Bora–Hansgrohe	+ 8' 19"
8	Cian Uijtdebroeks (BEL)	Bora–Hansgrohe	+ 8' 26"
9	João Almeida (POR)	UAE Team Emirates	+ 10' 08"
10	Santiago Buitrago (COL)	Team Bahrain Victorious	+ 12' 04"

== Stage 21 ==
17 September 2023 – Hipódromo de la Zarzuela to Madrid, 101.5 km (63.1 mi)

Stage 21 result
Rank	Rider	Team	Time
1	Kaden Groves (AUS)	Alpecin–Deceuninck	2h 24' 13"
2	Filippo Ganna (ITA)	Ineos Grenadiers	+ 0"
3	Nico Denz (GER)	Bora–Hansgrohe	+ 0"
4	Hugo Page (FRA)	Intermarché–Circus–Wanty	+ 0"
5	Iván García Cortina (ESP)	Movistar Team	+ 0"
6	Rui Costa (POR)	Intermarché–Circus–Wanty	+ 0"
7	Marijn van den Berg (NED)	EF Education–EasyPost	+ 0"
8	Remco Evenepoel (BEL)	Soudal–Quick-Step	+ 0"
9	Dries Van Gestel (BEL)	Team TotalEnergies	+ 0"
10	Lennard Kämna (GER)	Bora–Hansgrohe	+ 0"

General classification after stage 21
Rank	Rider	Team	Time
1	Sepp Kuss (USA)	Team Jumbo–Visma	76h 48' 21"
2	Jonas Vingegaard (DEN)	Team Jumbo–Visma	+ 17"
3	Primož Roglič (SLO)	Team Jumbo–Visma	+ 1' 08"
4	Juan Ayuso (ESP)	UAE Team Emirates	+ 3' 18"
5	Mikel Landa (ESP)	Team Bahrain Victorious	+ 3' 37"
6	Enric Mas (ESP)	Movistar Team	+ 4' 14"
7	Aleksandr Vlasov	Bora–Hansgrohe	+ 7' 53"
8	Cian Uijtdebroeks (BEL)	Bora–Hansgrohe	+ 8' 00"
9	João Almeida (POR)	UAE Team Emirates	+ 10' 08"
10	Santiago Buitrago (COL)	Team Bahrain Victorious	+ 11' 38"
