= Jonas Vingegaard =

Danish cyclist (born 1996)

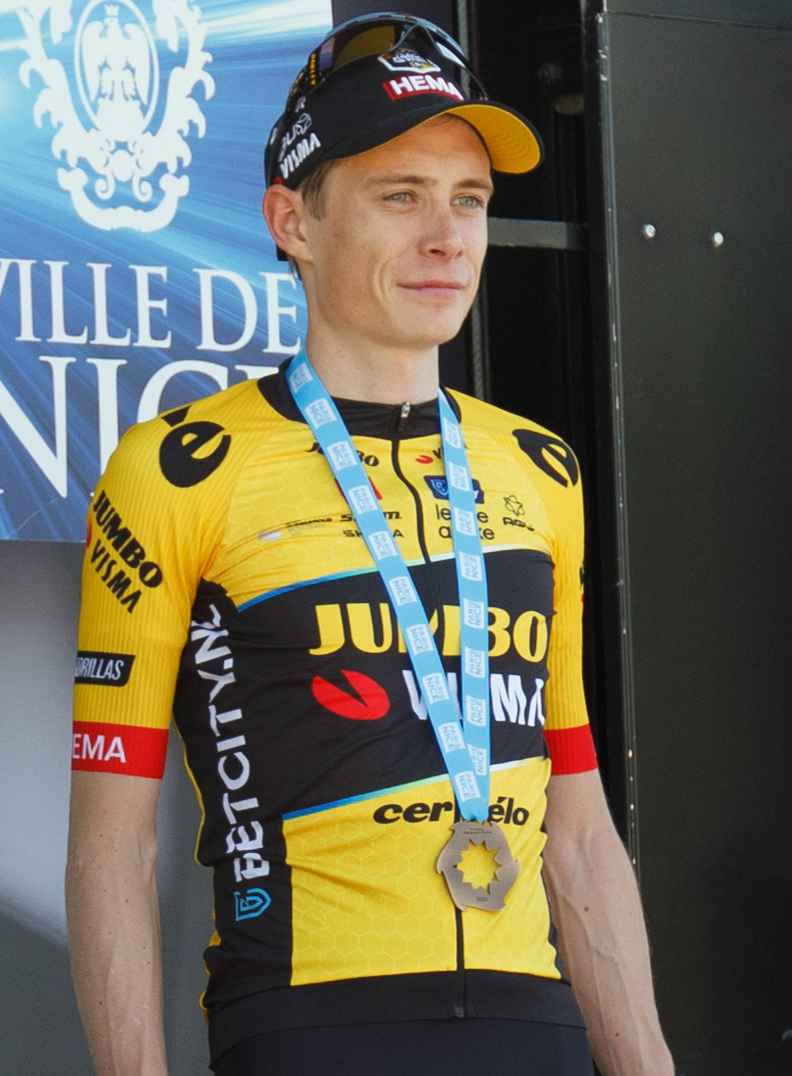
- Vingegaard at the 2023 Paris–Nice

Personal information
- Full name: Jonas Vingegaard Hansen
- Nicknames: Vinge; Re Pescatore (The Fisher King); The Fisherman
- Born: Jonas Vingegaard Rasmussen; 10 December 1996 (age 29) Hillerslev, Denmark
- Height: 1.75 m (5 ft 9 in)
- Weight: 58 kg (128 lb; 9 st 2 lb)

Cycling career
- Sport: Cycling
- Current team: Visma–Lease a Bike
- Discipline: Road
- Role: Rider
- Rider type: All-rounder

Amateur teams
- 2007–2012: Thy Cykle Ring
- 2013: Aalborg Cykle Ring
- 2014–2016: Odder CK

Professional teams
- 2016–2018: Team ColoQuick–Cult
- 2019–: Visma–Lease a Bike

Major wins
- Grand Tours Tour de France General classification (2022, 2023) Mountains classification (2022) 4 individual stages (2022, 2023, 2024) 1 TTT stage (2026) Giro d'Italia General classification (2026) 5 individual stages (2026) Vuelta a España General classification (2025) 5 individual stages (2023, 2025) Stage races Critérium du Dauphiné (2023) Paris–Nice (2026) Tour of the Basque Country (2023) Tirreno–Adriatico (2024) Volta a Catalunya (2026) Tour de Pologne (2024) Volta ao Algarve (2025) One-day races and Classics La Drôme Classic (2022) Other Vélo d'Or (2023)

Jonas Vingegaard Hansen (Danish: [ˈjoːnæs ˈve̝ŋəˌkɒːˀ ˈhænˀsn̩]; né Rasmussen; born 10 December 1996) is a Danish professional road racing cyclist. He rides for UCI WorldTeam Visma–Lease a Bike. Described as one of the best climbers of all time, he is equally celebrated for his rivalry with Tadej Pogačar that ranks among the sport's greatest. Vingegaard is one of only eight riders in history to have won all three Grand Tours, having won the 2022 and 2023 editions of the Tour de France, the 2025 Vuelta a España and the 2026 Giro d'Italia.

Vingegaard, whose youth career initially saw limited success, made his Grand Tour debut at the 2020 Vuelta a España. Then, in 2021, he participated in his first Tour de France and secured a second-place finish. In 2022, he returned to the Tour as one of the pre-race favourites, winning the overall classification alongside two stage victories and the polka dot jersey. This made him the second Danish cyclist ever to win the Tour de France; this achievement, coinciding with increased public interest following the 2022 Tour's Grand Départ in Copenhagen, made Vingegaard a national hero in Denmark.

In 2023, Vingegaard achieved his second successive Tour de France victory, before finishing second overall to his teammate Sepp Kuss at the Vuelta a España. For his achievements, Vingegaard was awarded the 2023 Vélo d'Or for the best cyclist of the season. In 2024, he missed several months of racing following a crash which punctured his lung. Despite this, Vingegaard returned for the Tour de France, winning a stage and finishing second overall behind Tadej Pogačar. In 2025, Vingegaard finished second in the Tour again, and first in the Vuelta a España, winning three stages.

== Career ==
=== Early career ===
Vingegaard was born and raised in Thy. He played both football and handball from an early age. Vingegaard was a spectator, alongside his father, when the first stage of the 2007 Danmark Rundt departed on 1 August from Thisted, the main town in the region. At the race, local cycling club Thy Cykle Ring had set up a home trainer so audience members could see what it was like to cycle up a mountain. He subsequently enrolled in the club and started riding in his first races. He cycled with the Thy Cykle Ring for five seasons, until he moved to Aalborg Cykle Ring in 2013. In 2014, his last year as a junior rider, Vingegaard joined Odder Cykel Klub. When he became a senior rider, he initially struggled and performed poorly in races. When Odder Cykel Club established a U23 team from the start of 2016, results improved for Vingegaard. In the spring, he finished on the podium at a race in Aalborg, and in May, he won a section of Pinse Cuppen in Hammel, where the riders had to climb the famed local hill Pøt Mølle several times.

=== Team ColoQuick–Cult (2016–2018) ===
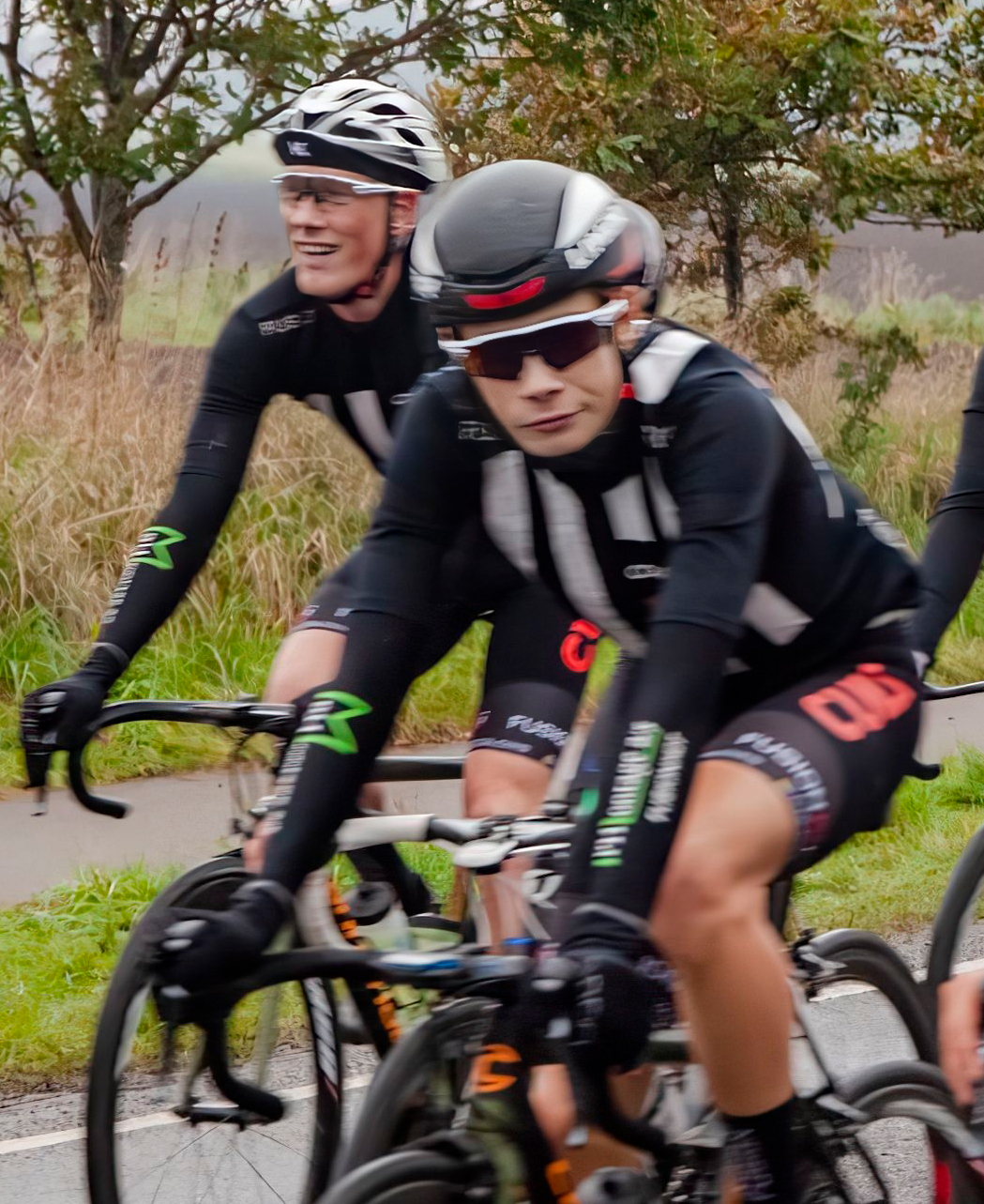
Vingegaard racing in 2017

As Vingegaard was beginning to achieve better results in races, Danish UCI Continental team ColoQuick–Cult and general manager Christian "Gummi" Andersen signed a contract with him in May 2016, and he switched teams with immediate effect. To structure his daily life, Andersen had Vingegaard start a job at Chrisfish, a fish factory in Hanstholm. Working there during weekdays, Vingegaard skinned fish from 6 am to noon before training in the afternoons. For a time, he worked with Michael Valgren at the factory, who was also pursuing a career as a professional cyclist.

In 2016, at the age of 19, he also accomplished his first major international result, finishing second in the UCI 2.1 level race Tour of China I.

In large parts of the 2017 season, Vingegaard did not take part in many races as he was sidelined with a broken femur after a crash in the 2017 Tour des Fjords. Before the injury, he finished in fourth place overall and won the youth competition in the French stage race Tour du Loir-et-Cher.

By the time he recovered from his broken leg and the 2018 season began, he returned to strong form. On a training trip to Spain in early March 2018, Vingegaard set the time record on the test climb Coll de Rates. He cycled the 6.5 kilometers in 13.02 minutes, which was 12 seconds faster than the previous record holder, Tejay van Garderen. In mid-2018, his physique was tested at Team Danmark. Afterwards, sports physiologist Lars Johansen said about Vingegaard:

He simply has a pump and a heart that is in a class of its own. His [heart] is far clear of the average of Danish, male cyclists'. He has a plus of maybe 15 percent, and that is significant.

=== Team Jumbo–Visma (2019–present) ===
He joined Team Jumbo–Visma in 2019, and that year, he achieved his first UCI WorldTour win in stage 6 of the Tour de Pologne.

The following year, he finished eighth in the 2020 Tour de Pologne. He also completed his first Grand Tour, the 2020 Vuelta a España, where he rode as a domestique for Primož Roglič, who went on to win the race overall.

==== 2021: Tour de France runner-up ====
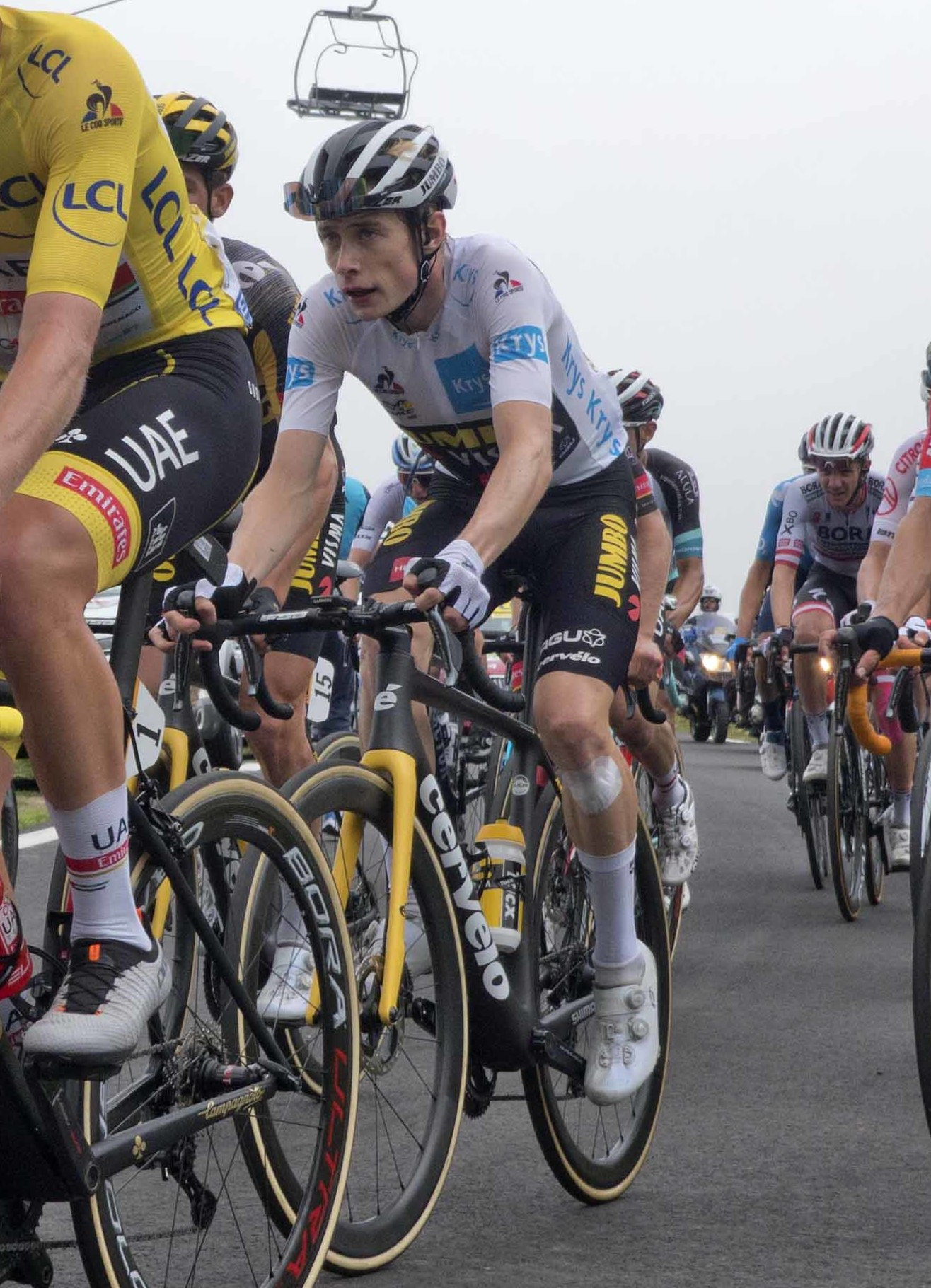
Vingegaard wearing the white jersey at the 2021 Tour de France

Vingegaard won stage 5 of his first race in 2021, the UAE Tour, before winning two stages and the overall in the Settimana Internazionale di Coppi e Bartali. Later in the year, he finished second overall behind his teammate, Roglič, in the Tour of the Basque Country.

In April, Vingegaard was named as a replacement for Tom Dumoulin in the team's 2021 Tour de France squad. In the Tour, Vingegaard originally rode as a domestique for Primož Roglič, who was one of the big favorites for the GC. On stage 3, Roglič crashed heavily and despite the team's efforts to bring him back, the team finished almost a minute and a half down. On stage 5, a 27.2-kilometre (16.9 mi) individual time trial, Vingegaard finished third to enter the top ten on GC. On stage 8, the race's first mountain stage, Vingegaard finished with the main GC group, losing almost three and a half minutes to Tadej Pogačar, who took over the yellow jersey. Vingegaard rose to fifth on GC at exactly five minutes down. After the stage, Roglič withdrew from the race due to his injuries, leaving Vingegaard as the team's only general classification contender.

On stage 11, which featured a double ascent of Mont Ventoux, Vingegaard attacked on the second climb of the Ventoux. Although Pogačar was initially able to follow him, Vingegaard was able to drop the yellow jersey, gaining an advantage of almost 40 seconds at the top. However, he was caught on the descent to the finish. As a result of his time gains, Vingegaard rose to third on GC. As the race headed into the Pyrenees, Vingegaard solidified his position on the podium. On stage 17, which finished atop Col du Portet, Vingegaard and Richard Carapaz were the only ones able to follow Pogačar's attack. In the sprint, Vingegaard finished second to Pogačar, rising to second on GC. The exact scenario took place on the next stage, which finished atop Luz Ardiden, with Vingegaard once again finishing second. On the penultimate day time trial, Vingegaard took third place once again, solidifying his second spot on GC. He safely finished the last stage to become the second Danish rider to achieve a podium finish in the Tour de France and the first since 1996.

==== 2022: Tour de France victory ====
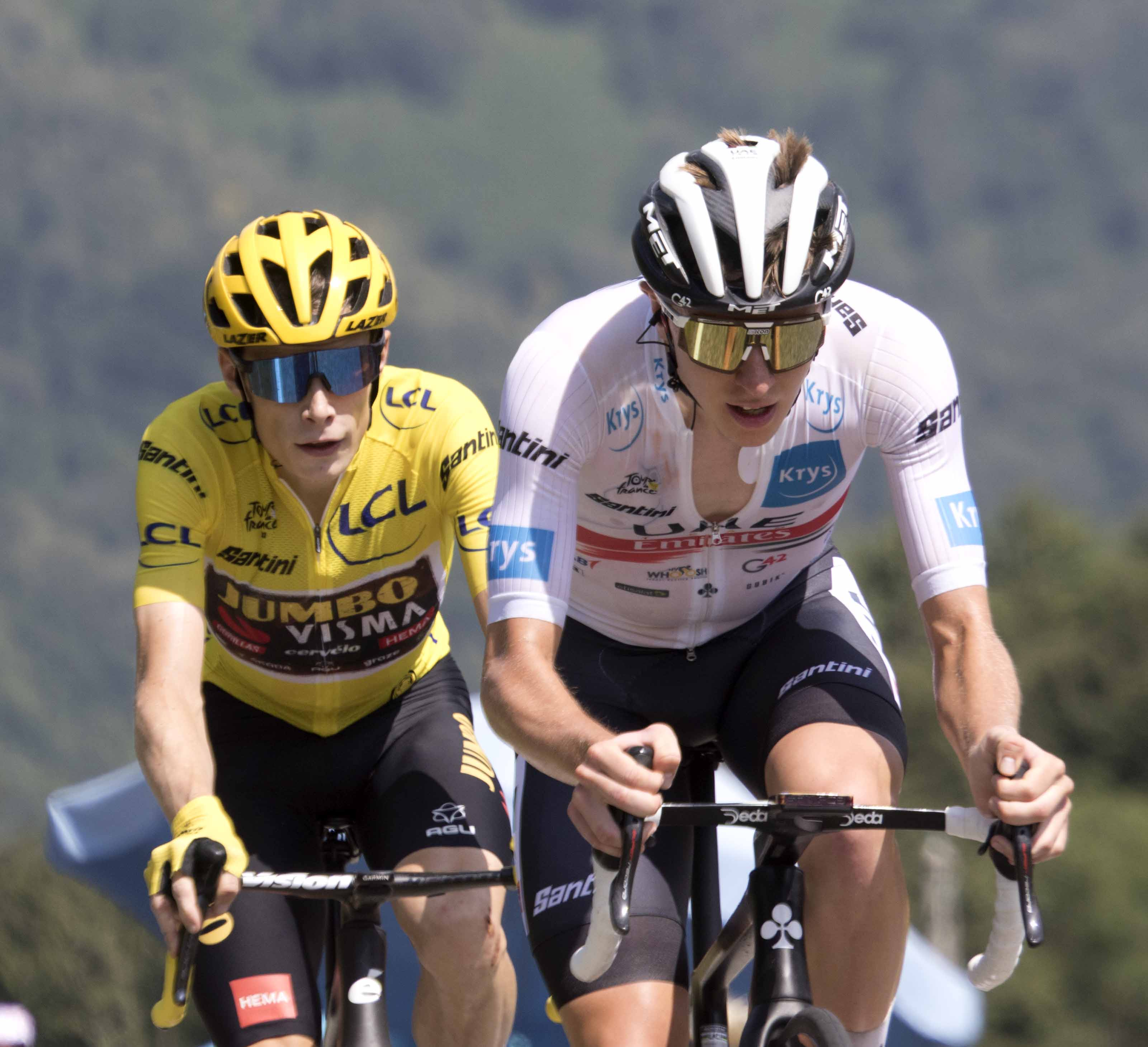
Vingegaard (left) wearing the maillot jaune riding with Tadej Pogačar at the 2022 Tour de France

His first major result of 2022 was finishing 2nd in Tirreno–Adriatico, which he followed up by finishing 6th in the 2022 Tour of the Basque Country. Team Jumbo-Visma dominated the 2022 Critérium du Dauphiné where Vingegaard finished 2nd behind teammate Roglič, and won the queen stage of the race.

He started the Tour de France in strong form, with Pogačar being the only GC rider finishing ahead of him after the opening stage individual time trial. On stage 5 Roglič suffered a crash, which cost him time and Vingegaard nearly lost considerable time himself. He suffered a mechanical and could no longer ride his bike, but teammate Nathan Van Hooydonck was nearby to give him his bike. Van Hooydonck's seat was positioned considerably higher than Vingegaard's, so he had to be out of the saddle the entire time. His teammate, Steven Kruijswijk came by and offered to give up his bike, but then the team car arrived and got his backup. Thanks in part to the powerful effort of Wout van Aert near the end of the stage, Vingegaard lost little time. In the following stages, he would battle with Pogačar for stage wins and time bonuses and end up as the only GC rider within a minute of the lead as the race entered the high mountains. Stage 11 included a final climb of the Col du Granon, a climb which had not been used since 1986, where Greg LeMond seized the yellow jersey from Bernard Hinault. Team Jumbo-Visma attacked Pogačar on the Col du Télégraphe and Col du Galibier with Roglič while having Laporte and Kruijswijk nearby and van Aert up the road. On the final climb Vingegaard attacked at the 5 km mark, and dropped Pogačar for the second time in his career, except this time Pogačar was not able to make it back. Relentlessly advancing, Vingegaard won the stage and the yellow jersey and gained +2:51 on Pogačar. This put Vingegaard in the lead and relegated Pogačar to third, behind second-placed Romain Bardet. This was the first Tour de France stage victory of his career. He defended his lead the following day which concluded with a mountaintop finish on Alpe d'Huez.

Over the next few stages, Pogačar made a few attacks, which forced open small gaps with the other top-placed GC riders, but Vingegaard was able to respond to each of them. Team Jumbo-Visma did suffer a serious setback prior to the rest day, losing two powerful riders with Roglič not starting stage 15, and Kruijswijk crashing out during the stage. Fortunately for Vingegaard the team's strongest mountain climbing domestique, Sepp Kuss, was riding with good form and would be there to start the third week. On stage 17, Vingegaard was the only rider to stay with the UAE Team Emirates combination of Pogačar and Brandon McNulty up the final climb. Inside the final 500 meters of the very steep finish, both Pogačar and Vingegaard attacked to go for the stage win, but Pogačar took it on the line. The only time Vingegaard lost was the four-second difference in bonus time. On stage 18 he answered the early attacks made by Pogačar. Prior to the final climb on Hautacam Pogačar crashed, and Vingegaard held up a moment and waited for Pogačar to catch up. On the final climb he followed the lead of Kuss the majority of the way. Not long after the work of Kuss was done he and Pogačar had caught Wout van Aert, who had attacked at kilometre zero. Before long Pogačar appeared to be on the verge of cracking behind them and Vingegaard seized the moment and attacked. By the time he crossed the line he put just over another minute into the two-time defending champion, claimed his second stage win, an unassailable lead in the Mountains Classification, and all but sealed his victory prior to the final time trial on stage 20. The battles between Pogačar and Vingegaard continuously blew the rest of the field apart. Going into stage 19 3rd place Geraint Thomas was about eight minutes back, and then David Gaudu and Nairo Quintana were over ten minutes and approaching 15 minutes behind respectively. During the final time trial he rode aggressively, and had among the fastest times at the first checkpoints, only backing off once it was clear no serious time would be lost. He crossed the finish line in Paris about a minute behind the sprinters, riding side by side with his remaining teammates to finish a historic Tour win, setting a record for the highest average speed ever throughout the entire race.

During the following months, Vingegaard was absent from several races where he was awaited after his victory in the Tour de France, especially the Tour of Denmark and the World Championships scheduled for September. Several newspapers questioned his state of morale and mentioned the "tough times" the champion was experiencing. He made his comeback on 27 September for the CRO Race, where he won two stages and finished second overall to Matej Mohorič by a single second.

==== 2023: second Tour win ====
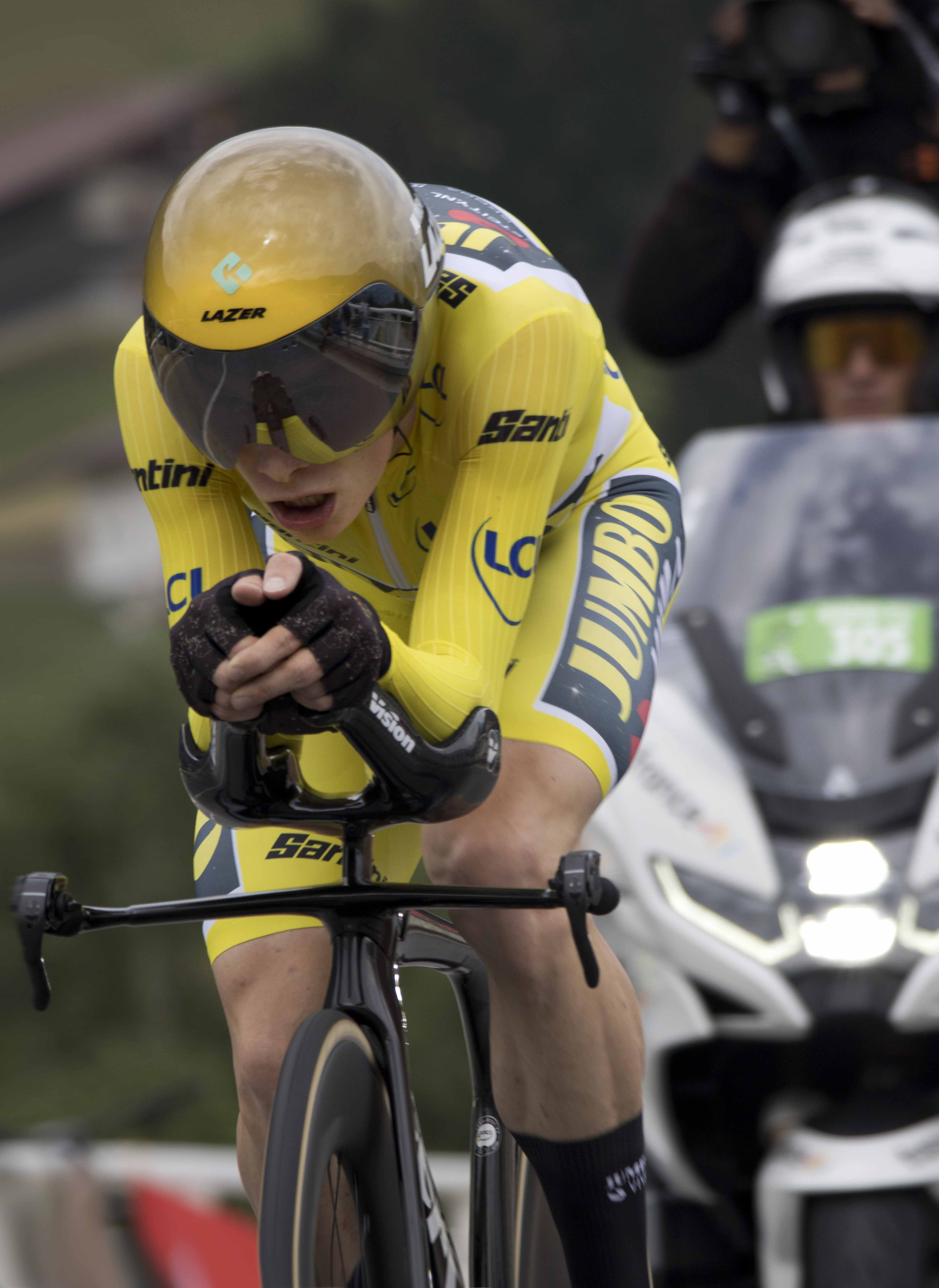
Vingegaard in the yellow jersey during the 2023 Tour de France

Vingegaard started off the 2023 season in late February at the O Gran Camiño stage race in Galicia, Spain. He swept the race, winning all three stages that were contested, as stage one was neutralized, in addition to the overall title and the mountains classification. He next competed at Paris–Nice, where he placed third overall behind Tadej Pogačar and David Gaudu, having lost just over 40 seconds to them on stage 4. He next entered and won the Tour of the Basque Country, along with three stage wins and the points classification in the process. At the Critérium du Dauphiné, the most important preparation event for the Tour, he won two stages and won the general classification by the biggest margin since 1993: over two minutes ahead of second place Adam Yates. Vingegaard's performances cemented him as one of the two favorites for the 2023 Tour de France alongside Pogačar.

At the Tour de France, Vingegaard started strong, attacking on stage 5, 1.5 km (0.93 mi) from the summit of the Marie-Blanque, and gaining over a minute on Pogačar. This moved Vingegaard into second overall behind stage winner Jai Hindley, while Pogačar dropped to 6th. The following stage proved the Tour would be a close battle, as Pogačar accelerated 2.5 km (1.6 mi) from the finish in Cauterets and dropped Vingegaard, winning the stage and gaining 24 seconds. Despite losing time to Pogačar, Vingegaard took the yellow jersey with a 25-second lead as the overnight leader Hindley dropped to third overall. Over the next mountain stages, Pogačar chipped away at Vingegaard's lead, reducing it to 17 seconds after stage 9 and just 9 seconds after stage 13.

The course of the race would dramatically change after the 22-kilometer time trial on stage 16. Pogačar rode first and set what appeared to be a strong result, taking the stage lead by 1:13 over Wout van Aert. However, Vingegaard proved to be on another level, leading by a wide margin at all time checks and finishing 1:38 ahead of Pogačar. Vingegaard described the stage win as "one of my best days on the bike ever," and commentators widely agreed it was one of the best and most shocking time trial performances in the history of the Tour. The following stage, a high mountain finish to Col de la Loze, would prove to be even more decisive, as Vingegaard cracked Pogačar early on the final climb and finished nearly 6 minutes ahead. This extended Vingegaard's overall lead to 7:35, and Vingegaard would defend this lead to Paris to win the race for the second consecutive year.

Vingegaard next competed at the 2023 Vuelta a España, going into the race as co-leader alongside Primož Roglič. In the first week, he maintained his position as a favorite for the overall classification. However, on the stage 10 time trial, he lost about a minute to Remco Evenepoel and Roglič, and found himself over two minutes behind teammate and race leader Sepp Kuss, who had gained several minutes in a breakaway on stage six. However, Vingegaard soon rallied to take stage wins on stages 13 and 16 as well as second to Roglič on stage 17, moving himself into second with only 8 seconds to Kuss. He ultimately finished second overall, 17 seconds behind Kuss, with Roglič finishing third in an unprecedented podium sweep for Team Jumbo–Visma.

==== 2024: crash, hospitalization, Tour runner-up ====
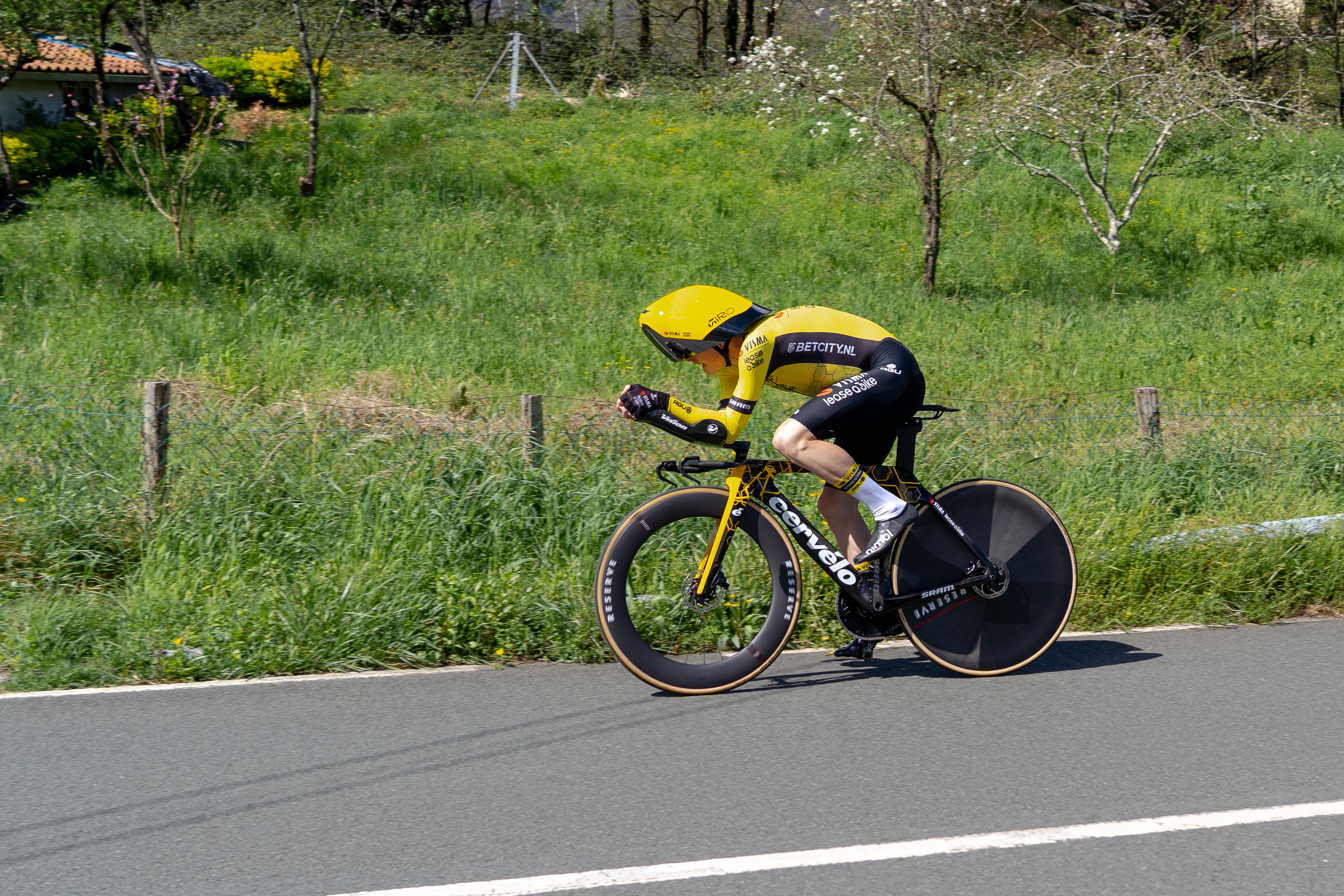
Vingegaard at the 2024 Tour of the Basque Country

In 2024, Vingegaard again began his season at the O Gran Camiño from 22 to 25 February, where he won the general, mountain, and points classifications. Vingegaard secured victories in all stages except the stage 1 time trial, each by a margin of more than 10 seconds. He then participated in the Tirreno-Adriatico between 4 and 10 March, winning the general and mountain classifications. Vingegaard achieved first place in stages 5 and 6, finishing 1:24 ahead of second-placed Juan Ayuso. Reflecting on Vingegaard's performance, Ayuso remarked, "I think I'm the first human in this race. Chapeau to Jonas," adding that "I think he right now is on another level so we have to fight for second, I'm happy."

Vingegaard's participation in the Tour of Basque Country was curtailed, owing to a crash on stage 4 on 4 April. The incident, which involved multiple riders, resulted in the race being neutralized. Vingegaard sustained a punctured lung, together with a broken collarbone and several ribs, necessitating hospitalization. This marked his first serious accident since winning the Tour de France in 2022. The crash was noted for its severity, affecting other competitors including Primož Roglič, Remco Evenepoel and Jay Vine. Following his crash, Team Visma-Lease a Bike confirmed that Vingegaard underwent a successful operation on his collarbone and would spend the following weeks in recovery. Sports director Merijn Zeeman stated that "Jonas only goes to the Tour if he is one hundred percent." On 20 June, Vingegaard was confirmed in Visma-Lease a Bike's Tour de France line-up, ending weeks of speculation about his fitness.

On 10 July, Vingegaard won his fourth career Tour de France stage on stage 11, outsprinting his main rival Tadej Pogačar. He had reeled Pogačar back in on the penultimate climb in Massif Central after Pogačar had pulled away from the field earlier in the stage. After his victory, Vingegaard said, "Three months ago, I really believed I was going to die. Now, sitting here with a stage win in the biggest race in the world, it's incredible." He finished the 2024 Tour in second place, falling 6'17" behind winner Tadej Pogačar and 3'01" ahead of Remco Evenepoel. During coverage of the race, Vingegaard was grouped together with Pogačar, Evenepoel, and Primož Roglič as one of cycling's Big Four, for their collective dominance of Grand Tours.

On 18 August, he won the general classification of the 2024 Tour de Pologne, 0'13" ahead of Diego Ulissi. It was his third stage race victory of the season. Following the victory, Vingegaard chose to end his 2024 season, skipping the Vuelta a España and the World Championships. Vingegaard cited his extreme fatigue after the 2024 Tour, saying "I'm tired, I don't think I've ever been this tired after a Grand Tour before."

==== 2025: Tour runner-up and Vuelta win ====
Vingegaard opened his season at the 2025 Volta ao Algarve, overturning a 20‑second deficit on the final uphill time trial to win both the stage and the general classification—his third successive victory in his first race of the year. This was his first victory in over 6 months, and the third year in a row where he won his opening race of the season.

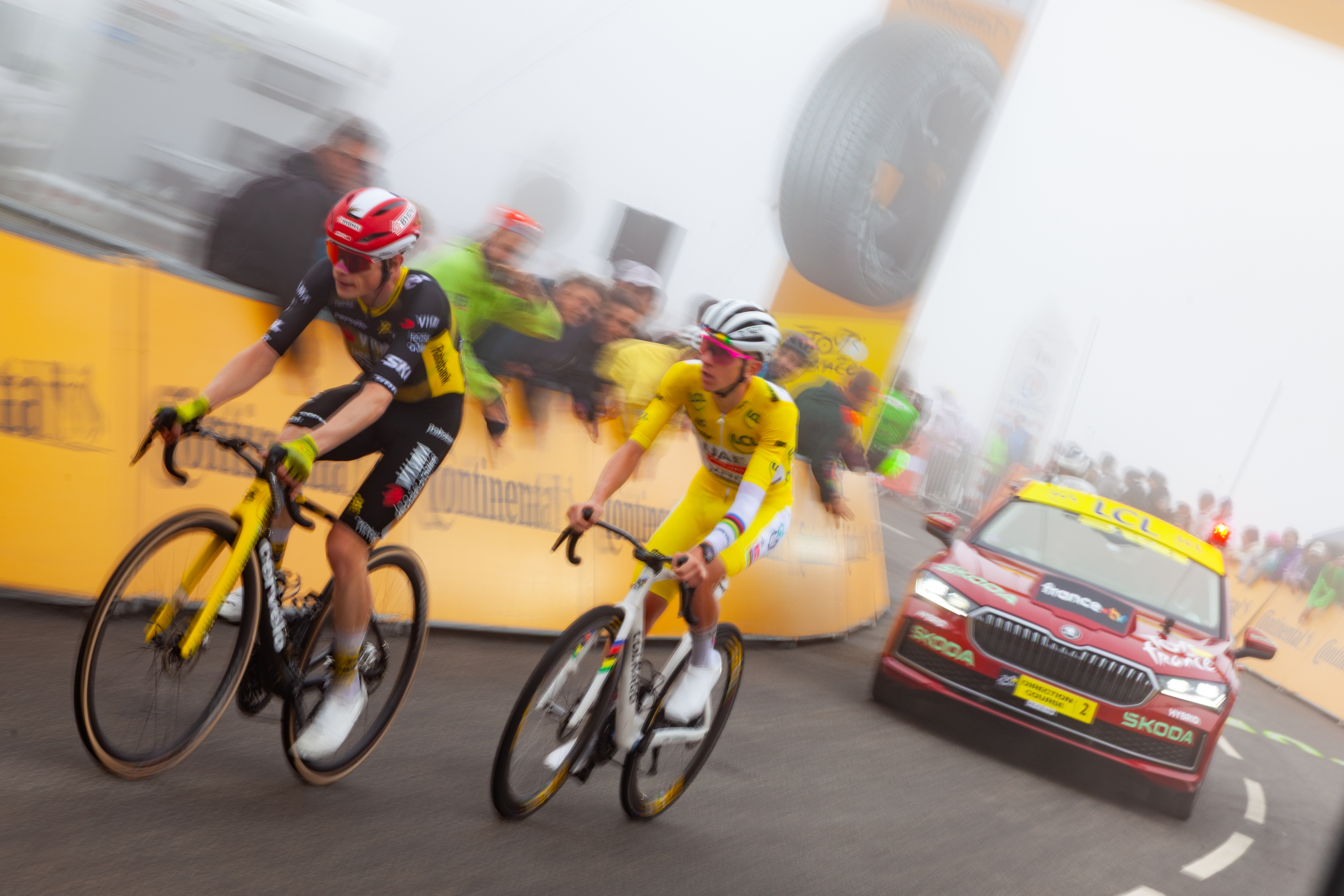
Vingegaard (left) climbing in front of race leader Tadej Pogačar on stage 14 of the 2025 Tour de France.

At Paris–Nice a hailstorm halted stage four with 45 kilometres remaining; when racing resumed Vingegaard finished second to João Almeida and took the overall lead. He crashed 24 hours later on stage five, sustaining a concussion, a cut lip and a wrist injury. Losing 26 seconds, he ceded the yellow jersey to team‑mate Matteo Jorgenson and withdrew before stage six.

Vingegaard returned to racing at the 2025 Critérium du Dauphiné, finishing second overall, 59 seconds behind Tadej Pogačar. He had earlier placed second to Remco Evenepoel in the stage‑three individual time trial and recorded three successive runner‑up finishes on the Alpine summit stages.

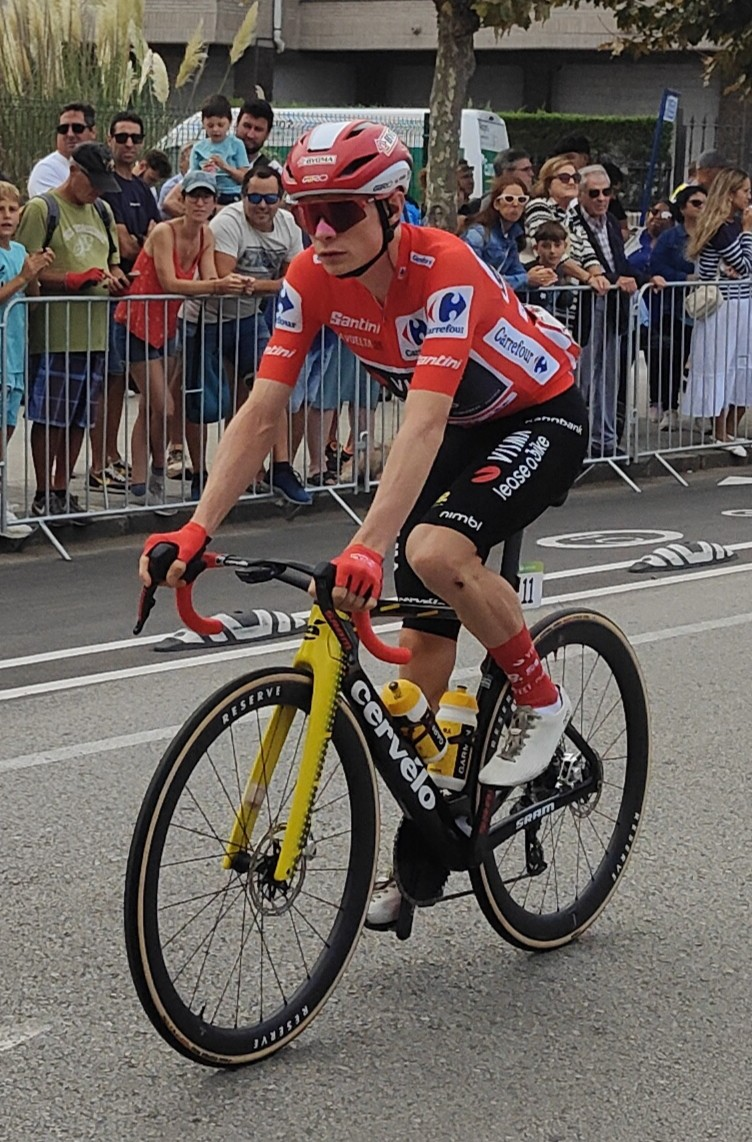
Vingegaard wearing the red leader's jersey at the 2025 Vuelta a España.

At the 2025 Tour de France, Vingegaard remained incident‑free through the opening flat stages but lost 1:03 to Pogačar after finishing 13th in the stage‑four time trial. He held the Slovenian's wheel over the next several days, yet conceded a further 2:07 on the first summit finish to Hautacam. A mountain time trial to Peyragudes on stage 13 extended his deficit to more than four minutes. Vingegaard attacked repeatedly on Mont Ventoux and again on the Alpine queen stage over the Col de la Madeleine and Col de la Loze, but Pogačar stayed on his wheel and beat him to the line on both occasions. Stage 19 was shortened after route changes to bypass livestock‑health restrictions on the Col des Saisies, and the revised course finished at La Plagne. Vingegaard outsprinted Pogačar there but was second to stage winner Thymen Arensman. He finished the Tour second overall, 4 minutes 24 seconds behind Pogačar—his fifth consecutive top‑two placing at the race.

Vingegaard started the 2025 Vuelta a España as the main favourite in the absence of Tadej Pogačar and took the overall lead with a stage victory on the second stage. He relinquished the lead for one day after the fourth stage due to inferior stage placings, first to David Gaudu and later to breakaway rider Torstein Træen. On the ninth stage, Vingegaard attacked 10 kilometres from the finish on the final climb to Valdezcaray and claimed his second stage win, gaining 24 seconds on Tom Pidcock and João Almeida while distancing the other general classification contenders by more than a minute. After the first rest day, he reclaimed the red jersey as overall leader and gained a further ten seconds on Almeida on the 11th stage. Although he was briefly dropped by Pidcock on the steep slopes of Pike Bidea, he closed the gap on the subsequent descent. The stage, which was scheduled to finish in Bilbao, was ultimately neutralized and abandoned following pro-Palestinian protests related to the Gaza war. On the following summit finishes, Almeida emerged as his main challenger: the Portuguese rider won on the Alto de l'Angliru, before Vingegaard prevailed the next day on La Farrapona. On both occasions, however, they were credited with the same finishing time. He led the general classification by 48 seconds before the final week and successfully defended his advantage, securing overall victory with a stage win on the penultimate stage atop Bola del Mundo. He won three stages in total and definitively took control of the red jersey after stage 10, maintaining a sufficient margin over Almeida to claim the third Grand Tour title of his career, following his two victories at the Tour de France.

He concluded his season by competing in the 2025 European Road Championships in France. He was dropped with more than 100 kilometres remaining on the Côte de Saint-Romain-de-Lerps and abandoned the race. He later attributed the result in part to limited preparation following his Vuelta victory, stating that he had taken "more time off the bike than [he] had hoped" and required nearly two weeks to resume full training.

==== 2026: Giro d'Italia triumph/Tour de France DNF ====
Vingegaard skipped the UAE Tour in February, initially scheduled to be his season opener. However, he went on to dominate Paris-Nice, winning the General classification, the King of the Mountains jersey and the points jersey, and two stage wins, including the decisive stage 4, where Red Bull-BORA-hansgrohe exploited the crosswinds, allowing Dani Martinez to gain time on all his rivals but Vingegaard. Following that he raced the Volta a Catalunya, where he won two stages and the General classification.

In May, Vingegaard made his long-awaited debut at the Giro d'Italia, two years after Tadej Pogačar won the race. Vingegaard was the main favourite, but analysts noted that the 2026 Giro field was the strongest since 2008 while the 2024 field was the weakest since 2003 (with the exception of the COVID-19 affected 2020 edition). Vingegaard's attack on stage 2 failed to distance his rivals and Guillermo Thomas Silva won the sprint, becoming the first Uruguayan to win a stage of a Grand Tour. On stage 5, Afonso Eulálio, widely regarded as the breakthrough rider of the Giro, finished 2nd from the breakaway, allowing him to take the pink jersey by 6:22 over Vingegaard. Vingegaard chipped away at this lead with stage wins on the subsequent summit finishes, stage 7 (Monte Blockhaus) and stage 9 (Corno alle Scale). He had a disappointing time trial on stage 10, where he lost 3 minutes to stage winner Filippo Ganna but more importantly 1:06 to Thymen Arensman. On stage 14 to Píla, Vingegaard took a dominant solo win with a margin of over 40 seconds over second placed Felix Gall, and moved into the pink jersey. He would take two more stage wins on stage 16 (Carí) and stage 20 (Piancavallo). The queen stage, stage 19, was won by Vingegaard's teammate Sepp Kuss, from the breakaway. Due to the dominance of Visma-lease a bike, who also placed Davide Piganzoli 8th on GC, Visma also won the teams' classification, with a margin of over 40 minutes over 2nd placed Red Bull-BORA-hansgrohe. Piganzoli, a new signing, was regarded as being Vingegaard's most important domestíque. Vingegaard said, after stage 17, that he would help Piganzoli, if he could, to win the youth classification. However, Afonso Eulálio prevailed there.

By winning the Giro, Vingegaard became only the eighth rider in history to win all three Grand Tours, joining Jacques Anquetil, Felice Gimondi, Eddy Merckx, Bernard Hinault, Alberto Contador, Vincenzo Nibali and Chris Froome. Analysts noted that Vingegaard achieved this feat before his rival Tadej Pogačar, a point in which Vingegaard was ahead in their rivalry.

At the 2026 Tour de France Vingegaard won the opening stage team time trial, by eight seconds, taking time on his main general classification rivals and the yellow jersey. On stage three, Vingegaard lost the yellow jersey to Pogačar, after Pogačar won the stage by two seconds, and got the time bonuses over Vingegaard.

On 19 July 2026, Vingegaard crashed out on stage 15 of the Tour de France. At the time of the crash, Vingegaard was in second place, 4 minutes 30 seconds behind Pogačar. He had suffered a fractured collarbone and would undergo surgery.

On 17 August 2026, it was confirmed that Vingegaard wouldn’t race the rest of the season, focusing on recovery and goals for the 2027 season.

== Personal life ==
Vingegaard is the son of Claus Christian Rasmussen and Karina Vingegaard Rasmussen from Hillerslev, Thy. He has one sister, Michelle Vingegaard Rasmussen. In primary school, he attended Hillerslev School until 7th grade, while he took 8th and 9th grades at Tingstrup School in Thisted. From August 2012, Vingegaard attended the voluntary 10th grade on the cycling track at ISI Idrætsefterskole in Ikast. Afterwards, he enrolled in Thisted Handelsgymnasium for secondary education, attending the Higher Commercial Examination Programme (HHX).

Vingegaard married Trine Marie Hansen (b. 1985) in Glyngøre. They met when Vingegaard was a rider with Team ColoQuick from 2016 to 2018, and Trine was the team's marketing manager. In September 2020, Trine gave birth to their daughter, Frida. In September 2024, they had a son, Hugo.

In 2026, the Vingegaards unveiled a new app (of which Trine was main developer) entitled MyPreffy. The app provides user-generated recommendations to other users for cafes, restaurants and other destinations and has subsequently been promoted in Visma Lease a Bikes social media vlogs during the three Grand Tours. Vingegaard's mother-in-law is Rosa Kildahl Christensen, who became nationally known as a participant in Den store bagedyst in 2017, the Danish version of the British televised baking competition The Great British Bake Off.

== Career achievements ==
=== Major results ===
2016
2nd Overall Tour of China I
2017
2nd GP Viborg
4th Overall Tour du Loir-et-Cher

1st Young rider classification

5th Sundvolden GP
7th Ringerike GP
2018
1st Prologue Giro della Valle d'Aosta
1st Stage 4 (TTT) Tour de l'Avenir
4th Sundvolden GP
5th Overall Tour du Loir-et-Cher

1st Young rider classification

5th Overall Grand Prix Priessnitz spa
5th Ringerike GP
9th Overall Le Triptyque des Monts et Châteaux
2019 (1 pro win)
1st Stage 6 Tour de Pologne
2nd Overall Danmark Rundt
9th Overall Deutschland Tour
2020
8th Overall Tour de Pologne
2021 (4)
1st Overall Settimana Internazionale di Coppi e Bartali

1st Points classification
1st Stages 2 & 4

1st Stage 5 UAE Tour
2nd Overall Tour de France
2nd Overall Tour of the Basque Country

1st Young rider classification

8th Clásica de San Sebastián
2022 (7)
1st Overall Tour de France

1st Mountains classification
1st Stages 11 & 18

1st La Drôme Classic
2nd Overall Critérium du Dauphiné

1st Stage 8

2nd Overall Tirreno–Adriatico
2nd Overall CRO Race

1st Stages 3 & 5

6th Overall Tour of the Basque Country
2023 (15)
1st Overall Tour de France

1st Stage 16 (ITT)
Held after Stage 14

1st Overall Tour of the Basque Country

1st Points classification
1st Stages 3, 4 & 6

1st Overall Critérium du Dauphiné

1st Stages 5 & 7

1st Overall O Gran Camiño

1st Mountains classification
1st Stages 2, 3 & 4 (ITT)

2nd Overall Vuelta a España

1st Stages 13 & 16
Held after Stage 13

3rd Overall Paris–Nice

1st Stage 3 (TTT)

2024 (9)
1st Overall Tirreno–Adriatico

1st Mountains classification
1st Stages 5 & 6

1st Overall O Gran Camiño

1st Points classification
1st Mountains classification
1st Stages 2, 3 & 4

1st Overall Tour de Pologne
2nd Overall Tour de France

1st Stage 11

2025 (6)
1st Overall Vuelta a España

1st Stages 2, 9 & 20
Held after Stage 3
Held after Stage 2

1st Overall Volta ao Algarve

1st Stage 5 (ITT)

1st Stage 3 (TTT) Paris–Nice
2nd Overall Tour de France
2nd Overall Critérium du Dauphiné
2026 (12)
1st Overall Giro d'Italia

1st Stages 7, 9, 14, 16 & 20
Held after Stages 7–18

1st Overall Paris–Nice

1st Points classification
1st Mountains classification
1st Stages 4 & 5

1st Overall Volta a Catalunya

1st Stages 5 & 6

Tour de France

1st Stage 1 (TTT)
Held after Stages 1–2

==== General classification results timeline ====
Grand Tour general classification results
Grand Tour	2019	2020	2021	2022	2023	2024	2025	2026
Giro d'Italia	—	—	—	—	—	—	—	1
Tour de France	—	—	2	1	1	2	2	DNF
Vuelta a España	—	46	—	—	2	—	1	—
Major stage race general classification results
Major stage race	2019	2020	2021	2022	2023	2024	2025	2026
Paris–Nice	—	—	—	—	3	—	DNF	1
Tirreno–Adriatico	—	—	—	2	—	1	—	—
Volta a Catalunya	—	NH	—	—	—	—	—	1
Tour of the Basque Country	32	NH	2	6	1	DNF	—	—
Tour de Romandie	72	NH	—	—	—	—	—	—
Critérium du Dauphiné	—	—	51	2	1	—	2	—
Tour de Suisse	—	NH	—	—	—	—	—	—

Legend
—	Did not compete
NH	Not Held
DNF	Did not finish
DSQ	Disqualified

==== Grand Tour record ====
	2020	2021	2022	2023	2024	2025	2026
Giro d'Italia	DNE	DNE	DNE	DNE	DNE	DNE	1
Stages won	—	—	—	—	—	—	5
Points classification	—	—	—	—	—	—	5
Mountains classification	—	—	—	—	—	—	2
Tour de France	DNE	2	1	1	2	2	DNF-15
Stages won	—	0	2	1	1	0	—
Points classification	—	10	7	5	10	4	—
Mountains classification	—	2	1	3	3	2	—
Young rider classification	—	2	—	—	—	—	—
Vuelta a España	46	DNE	DNE	2	DNE	1	DNE
Stages won	0	—	—	2	—	3	—
Points classification	73	—	—	5	—	2	—
Mountains classification	NR	—	—	2	—	2	—
Young rider classification	14	—	—	—	—	—	—

Legend
1	Winner
2–3	Top three-finish
4–10	Top ten-finish
11–	Other finish
DNE	Did not enter
DNF-x	Did not finish (retired on stage x)
DNS-x	Did not start (not started on stage x)
HD-x	Finished outside time limit (occurred on stage x)
DSQ	Disqualified
N/A	Race/classification not held
NR	Not ranked in this classification

=== Grand tour stage wins ===
Giro d’Italia	Year	Final Climb	Length	Avg Gradient	Summit Altitude	Solo Attack Distance	KOM record	Previous KOM record	Stage Distance	Total Elevation Gain
Stage 7	2026	Blockhaus	13,6 km	8,4%	~1.665 m	5 km	New KOM 39:05	Nairo Quintana 2017, 39:54	245 km	~4.700 m
Stage 9	2026	Corno alle Scale	10,8 km	5,8%	~1.780 m	2 km	New KOM 14:14	Gilberto Simoni 2004, 15:12	184 km	~2.400 m
Stage 14	2026	Pila	16,6 km	7,0%	~1.800 m	4,5 km	New KOM 39:56	Unknown	186 km	~4.500 m
Stage 16	2026	Carì	11,6 km	8,0%	~1.650 m	6,6 km	New KOM 30:50	Adam Yates 2024, 31:48	113 km	~3.000 m
Stage 20	2026	Piancavallo	14,5 km	7,8%	~1.290 m	11 km	New KOM 36:17	Marco Pantani 1998, 36:20	200 km	~3.750 m

Vuelta a Espana	Year	Final Climb	Length	Avg Gradient	Summit Altitude	Solo attack distance	KOM record	Previous KOM record	Stage Distance	Total Elevation Gain
Stage 13	2023	Col du Tourmalet	18,9 km	7,4%	~2.115 m	8 km	New KOM 50:47 (Tourmalet D917)	Thibaut Pinot 2019, 51:10	135 km	~ 4.300 m
Stage 16	2023	Puerto de Bejes	4,9 km	8,5%	~529 m	4 km			120,5 km	~2.000 m
Stage 2	2025	Puerto Limone	9,9 km	5,2%	~1389 m	Sprint reduced GC group			156,6 km	~ 2.700 m
Stage 9	2025	Valdezcaray	13,3 km	5,2%	~ 1541 m	10 km	New KOM 25:54	Marcos Garcia, Nicolas Roche 2012, 30:20	195,5 km	~ 3.500 m
Stage 20	2025	Bola del Mundo	12,4 km	8,6%	~ 2253 m	1,5 km			165,6 km	~ 4.200 m

=== Honours and awards ===
- Danish Sports Name of the Year: 2022
- Vélo d'Or: 2023
