= 2021 Tour of the Basque Country =

Cycling race

2021 UCI World Tour, race 13 of 29

Race details
- Dates: 5–10 April 2021
- Stages: 6
- Distance: 797.7 km (495.7 mi)
- Winning time: 19h 11' 36"

Results
Jersey awarded to the overall winner	Winner	Primož Roglič (SLO)	(Team Jumbo–Visma)
	Second	Jonas Vingegaard (DEN)	(Team Jumbo–Visma)
	Third	Tadej Pogačar (SLO)	(UAE Team Emirates)
Jersey awarded to the points classification winner	Points	Primož Roglič (SLO)	(Team Jumbo–Visma)
Jersey awarded to the mountains classification winner	Mountains	Primož Roglič (SLO)	(Team Jumbo–Visma)
Jersey awarded to the youth classification winner	Youth	Jonas Vingegaard (DEN)	(Team Jumbo–Visma)
Jersey awarded to the team classification winner	Team	Team Jumbo–Visma	

The 2021 Tour of the Basque Country was a road cycling stage race that took place between 5 and 10 April 2021 in the titular region in northern Spain. It was the 60th edition of the Tour of the Basque Country and the 13th race of the 2021 UCI World Tour.

== Teams ==
All nineteen UCI WorldTeams and five UCI ProTeams participated in the race. Of these twenty-four teams, only Team Qhubeka Assos, with six riders, did not field the maximum allowed of seven riders. From the 165 riders who started the race, 103 finished.

UCI WorldTeams

- AG2R Citroën Team
- Astana–Premier Tech
- Bora–Hansgrohe
- Cofidis
- Deceuninck–Quick-Step
- EF Education–Nippo
- Groupama–FDJ
- Ineos Grenadiers
- Intermarché–Wanty–Gobert Matériaux
- Israel Start-Up Nation
- Lotto–Soudal
- Movistar Team
- Team Bahrain Victorious
- Team BikeExchange
- Team DSM
- Team Jumbo–Visma
- Team Qhubeka Assos
- Trek–Segafredo
- UAE Team Emirates

UCI ProTeams

- Burgos BH
- Caja Rural–Seguros RGA
- Equipo Kern Pharma
- Euskaltel–Euskadi
- Total Direct Énergie

== Route ==
The full route of the 2021 Tour of the Basque Country was announced on 26 February 2021.

Stage characteristics and winners
Stage	Date	Route	Distance	Type	Winner
1	5 April	Bilbao to Bilbao	13.9 km (8.6 mi)	Individual time trial	Primož Roglič (SLO)
2	6 April	Zalla to Sestao	154.8 km (96.2 mi)	Hilly stage	Alex Aranburu (ESP)
3	7 April	Amurrio to Ermualde (Laudio)	167.7 km (104.2 mi)	Medium-mountain stage	Tadej Pogačar (SLO)
4	8 April	Gasteiz to Hondarribia	189.2 km (117.6 mi)	Hilly stage	Ion Izagirre (ESP)
5	9 April	Hondarribia to Ondarroa	160.2 km (99.5 mi)	Hilly stage	Mikkel Frølich Honoré (DEN)
6	10 April	Ondarroa to Arrate (Eibar)	111.9 km (69.5 mi)	Mountain stage	David Gaudu (FRA)
Total			797.7 km (495.7 mi)		

== Stages ==
=== Stage 1 ===
5 April 2021 — Bilbao to Bilbao, 13.9 km (8.6 mi), (ITT)

Stage 1 Result
Rank	Rider	Team	Time
1	Primož Roglič (SLO)	Team Jumbo–Visma	17' 17"
2	Brandon McNulty (USA)	UAE Team Emirates	+ 2"
3	Jonas Vingegaard (DEN)	Team Jumbo–Visma	+ 18"
4	Tobias Foss (NOR)	Team Jumbo–Visma	+ 24"
5	Tadej Pogačar (SLO)	UAE Team Emirates	+ 28"
6	Adam Yates (GBR)	Ineos Grenadiers	+ 28"
7	Patrick Bevin (NZL)	Israel Start-Up Nation	+ 28"
8	Ide Schelling (NED)	Bora–Hansgrohe	+ 29"
9	Alex Aranburu (ESP)	Astana–Premier Tech	+ 30"
10	Maximilian Schachmann (GER)	Bora–Hansgrohe	+ 31"

General classification after Stage 1
Rank	Rider	Team	Time
1	Primož Roglič (SLO)	Team Jumbo–Visma	17' 17"
2	Brandon McNulty (USA)	UAE Team Emirates	+ 2"
3	Jonas Vingegaard (DEN)	Team Jumbo–Visma	+ 18"
4	Tobias Foss (NOR)	Team Jumbo–Visma	+ 24"
5	Tadej Pogačar (SLO)	UAE Team Emirates	+ 28"
6	Adam Yates (GBR)	Ineos Grenadiers	+ 28"
7	Patrick Bevin (NZL)	Israel Start-Up Nation	+ 28"
8	Ide Schelling (NED)	Bora–Hansgrohe	+ 29"
9	Alex Aranburu (ESP)	Astana–Premier Tech	+ 30"
10	Maximilian Schachmann (GER)	Bora–Hansgrohe	+ 31"

=== Stage 2 ===
6 April 2021 — Zalla to Sestao, 154.8 km (96.2 mi)

Stage 2 Result
Rank	Rider	Team	Time
1	Alex Aranburu (ESP)	Astana–Premier Tech	3h 45' 32"
2	Omar Fraile (ESP)	Astana–Premier Tech	+ 15"
3	Tadej Pogačar (SLO)	UAE Team Emirates	+ 15"
4	David Gaudu (FRA)	Groupama–FDJ	+ 15"
5	Michael Woods (CAN)	Israel Start-Up Nation	+ 15"
6	Primož Roglič (SLO)	Team Jumbo–Visma	+ 15"
7	Maximilian Schachmann (GER)	Bora–Hansgrohe	+ 15"
8	Mikel Landa (ESP)	Team Bahrain Victorious	+ 15"
9	Sergio Higuita (COL)	EF Education–Nippo	+ 15"
10	Alejandro Valverde (ESP)	Movistar Team	+ 15"

General classification after Stage 2
Rank	Rider	Team	Time
1	Primož Roglič (SLO)	Team Jumbo–Visma	4h 03' 04"
2	Alex Aranburu (ESP)	Astana–Premier Tech	+ 5"
3	Brandon McNulty (USA)	UAE Team Emirates	+ 6"
4	Tadej Pogačar (SLO)	UAE Team Emirates	+ 24"
5	Adam Yates (GBR)	Ineos Grenadiers	+ 28"
6	Maximilian Schachmann (GER)	Bora–Hansgrohe	+ 31"
7	Jonas Vingegaard (DEN)	Team Jumbo–Visma	+ 32"
8	Omar Fraile (ESP)	Astana–Premier Tech	+ 34"
9	Wilco Kelderman (NED)	Bora–Hansgrohe	+ 40"
10	Pello Bilbao (ESP)	Team Bahrain Victorious	+ 42"

=== Stage 3 ===
7 April 2021 — Amurrio to Ermualde (Laudio), 167.7 km (104.2 mi)

Stage 3 Result
Rank	Rider	Team	Time
1	Tadej Pogačar (SLO)	UAE Team Emirates	4h 04' 50"
2	Primož Roglič (SLO)	Team Jumbo–Visma	+ 0"
3	Alejandro Valverde (ESP)	Movistar Team	+ 5"
4	Adam Yates (GBR)	Ineos Grenadiers	+ 5"
5	Mikel Landa (ESP)	Team Bahrain Victorious	+ 5"
6	David Gaudu (FRA)	Groupama–FDJ	+ 8"
7	James Knox (GBR)	Deceuninck–Quick-Step	+ 16"
8	Jonas Vingegaard (DEN)	Team Jumbo–Visma	+ 16"
9	Mauri Vansevenant (BEL)	Deceuninck–Quick-Step	+ 16"
10	Brandon McNulty (USA)	UAE Team Emirates	+ 18"

General classification after Stage 3
Rank	Rider	Team	Time
1	Primož Roglič (SLO)	Team Jumbo–Visma	8h 07' 48"
2	Tadej Pogačar (SLO)	UAE Team Emirates	+ 20"
3	Brandon McNulty (USA)	UAE Team Emirates	+ 30"
4	Adam Yates (GBR)	Ineos Grenadiers	+ 39"
5	Alejandro Valverde (ESP)	Movistar Team	+ 50"
6	Jonas Vingegaard (DEN)	Team Jumbo–Visma	+ 54"
7	Mikel Landa (ESP)	Team Bahrain Victorious	+ 1' 00"
8	Pello Bilbao (ESP)	Team Bahrain Victorious	+ 1' 08"
9	Maximilian Schachmann (GER)	Bora–Hansgrohe	+ 1' 09"
10	Mauri Vansevenant (BEL)	Deceuninck–Quick-Step	+ 1' 09"

=== Stage 4 ===
8 April 2021 — Gasteiz to Hondarribia, 189.2 km (117.6 mi)

Stage 4 Result
Rank	Rider	Team	Time
1	Ion Izagirre (ESP)	Astana–Premier Tech	4h 17' 07"
2	Pello Bilbao (ESP)	Team Bahrain Victorious	+ 0"
3	Brandon McNulty (USA)	UAE Team Emirates	+ 0"
4	Jonas Vingegaard (DEN)	Team Jumbo–Visma	+ 0"
5	Emanuel Buchmann (GER)	Bora–Hansgrohe	+ 0"
6	Esteban Chaves (COL)	Team BikeExchange	+ 2"
7	Patrick Bevin (NZL)	Israel Start-Up Nation	+ 49"
8	James Knox (GBR)	Deceuninck–Quick-Step	+ 49"
9	Quinten Hermans (BEL)	Intermarché–Wanty–Gobert Matériaux	+ 49"
10	Alejandro Valverde (ESP)	Movistar Team	+ 49"

General classification after Stage 4
Rank	Rider	Team	Time
1	Brandon McNulty (USA)	UAE Team Emirates	12h 25' 21"
2	Primož Roglič (SLO)	Team Jumbo–Visma	+ 23"
3	Jonas Vingegaard (DEN)	Team Jumbo–Visma	+ 28"
4	Pello Bilbao (ESP)	Team Bahrain Victorious	+ 36"
5	Tadej Pogačar (SLO)	UAE Team Emirates	+ 43"
6	Adam Yates (GBR)	Ineos Grenadiers	+ 1' 02"
7	Emanuel Buchmann (GER)	Bora–Hansgrohe	+ 1' 07"
8	Alejandro Valverde (ESP)	Movistar Team	+ 1' 13"
9	Ion Izagirre (ESP)	Astana–Premier Tech	+ 1' 15"
10	Mikel Landa (ESP)	Team Bahrain Victorious	+ 1' 23"

=== Stage 5 ===
9 April 2021 — Hondarribia to Ondarroa, 160.2 km (99.5 mi)

Stage 5 Result
Rank	Rider	Team	Time
1	Mikkel Frølich Honoré (DEN)	Deceuninck–Quick-Step	3h 39' 54"
2	Josef Černý (CZE)	Deceuninck–Quick-Step	+ 0"
3	Julien Bernard (FRA)	Trek–Segafredo	+ 17"
4	Daryl Impey (RSA)	Israel Start-Up Nation	+ 28"
5	Simon Clarke (AUS)	Team Qhubeka Assos	+ 28"
6	Stefano Oldani (ITA)	Lotto–Soudal	+ 28"
7	Primož Roglič (SLO)	Team Jumbo–Visma	+ 28"
8	Julien Simon (FRA)	Total Direct Énergie	+ 28"
9	Magnus Cort (DEN)	EF Education–Nippo	+ 28"
10	Tadej Pogačar (SLO)	UAE Team Emirates	+ 28"

General classification after Stage 5
Rank	Rider	Team	Time
1	Brandon McNulty (USA)	UAE Team Emirates	16h 05' 43"
2	Primož Roglič (SLO)	Team Jumbo–Visma	+ 23"
3	Jonas Vingegaard (DEN)	Team Jumbo–Visma	+ 28"
4	Pello Bilbao (ESP)	Team Bahrain Victorious	+ 36"
5	Tadej Pogačar (SLO)	UAE Team Emirates	+ 43"
6	Adam Yates (GBR)	Ineos Grenadiers	+ 1' 02"
7	Emanuel Buchmann (GER)	Bora–Hansgrohe	+ 1' 07"
8	Alejandro Valverde (ESP)	Movistar Team	+ 1' 13"
9	Ion Izagirre (ESP)	Astana–Premier Tech	+ 1' 15"
10	Mikel Landa (ESP)	Team Bahrain Victorious	+ 1' 23"

=== Stage 6 ===
10 April 2021 — Ondarroa to Arrate (Eibar), 111.9 km (69.5 mi)

Stage 6 Result
Rank	Rider	Team	Time
1	David Gaudu (FRA)	Groupama–FDJ	3h 05' 42"
2	Primož Roglič (SLO)	Team Jumbo–Visma	+ 0"
3	Alejandro Valverde (ESP)	Movistar Team	+ 35"
4	Adam Yates (GBR)	Ineos Grenadiers	+ 35"
5	Tadej Pogačar (SLO)	UAE Team Emirates	+ 35"
6	Jonas Vingegaard (DEN)	Team Jumbo–Visma	+ 35"
7	Pello Bilbao (ESP)	Team Bahrain Victorious	+ 1' 03"
8	Esteban Chaves (COL)	Team BikeExchange	+ 1' 05"
9	Mikel Landa (ESP)	Team Bahrain Victorious	+ 1' 05"
10	Mauri Vansevenant (BEL)	Deceuninck–Quick-Step	+ 1' 55"

General classification after Stage 6
Rank	Rider	Team	Time
1	Primož Roglič (SLO)	Team Jumbo–Visma	19h 11' 36"
2	Jonas Vingegaard (DEN)	Team Jumbo–Visma	+ 52"
3	Tadej Pogačar (SLO)	UAE Team Emirates	+ 1' 07"
4	Adam Yates (GBR)	Ineos Grenadiers	+ 1' 26"
5	David Gaudu (FRA)	Groupama–FDJ	+ 1' 27"
6	Pello Bilbao (ESP)	Team Bahrain Victorious	+ 1' 28"
7	Alejandro Valverde (ESP)	Movistar Team	+ 1' 33"
8	Mikel Landa (ESP)	Team Bahrain Victorious	+ 2' 17"
9	Esteban Chaves (COL)	Team BikeExchange	+ 2' 38"
10	Ion Izagirre (ESP)	Astana–Premier Tech	+ 2' 59"

== Classification leadership table ==
Classification leadership by stage
Stage	Winner	General classification	Points classification	Mountains classification	Young rider classification	Basque rider classification	Team classification	Combativity award
1	Primož Roglič	Primož Roglič	Primož Roglič	Tadej Pogačar	Brandon McNulty	Alex Aranburu	Team Jumbo–Visma	Brandon McNulty
2	Alex Aranburu	Primož Roglič	Primož Roglič	Maximilian Schachmann	Brandon McNulty	Alex Aranburu	Astana–Premier Tech	Alex Aranburu
3	Tadej Pogačar	Primož Roglič	Primož Roglič	Tadej Pogačar	Tadej Pogačar	Mikel Landa	Team Jumbo–Visma	Oier Lazkano
4	Ion Izagirre	Brandon McNulty	Primož Roglič	Tadej Pogačar	Brandon McNulty	Pello Bilbao	Team Jumbo–Visma	Juan Pedro López
5	Mikkel Frølich Honoré	Brandon McNulty	Primož Roglič	Tadej Pogačar	Brandon McNulty	Pello Bilbao	Team Jumbo–Visma	Carlos Canal
6	David Gaudu	Primož Roglič	Primož Roglič	Primož Roglič	Jonas Vingegaard	Pello Bilbao	Team Jumbo–Visma	Hugh Carthy
Final		Primož Roglič	Primož Roglič	Primož Roglič	Jonas Vingegaard	Pello Bilbao	Team Jumbo–Visma	Not awarded

- On stage 2, Jonas Vingegaard, who was third in the points classification, wore the green jersey, because first-placed Primož Roglič wore the yellow jersey as the leader of the general classification, and second-placed Brandon McNulty wore the blue jersey as the leader of the young rider classification.
- On stage 3, Alex Aranburu, who was second in the points classification, wore the green jersey, because first-placed Primož Roglič wore the yellow jersey as the leader of the general classification.
- On stage 4, Alex Aranburu, who was third in the points classification, wore the green jersey, because first-placed Primož Roglič wore the yellow jersey as the leader of the general classification, and second-placed Tadej Pogačar wore the polka-dot jersey as the leader of the mountains classification.
- On stage 4, Brandon McNulty, who was second in the young rider classification, wore the blue jersey, because first-placed Tadej Pogačar wore the polka-dot jersey as the leader of the mountains classification.
- On stages 5 and 6, Jonas Vingegaard, who was second in the young rider classification, wore the blue jersey, because first-placed Brandon McNulty wore the yellow jersey as the leader of the general classification.

== Final classification standings ==
Legend
Denotes the winner of the general classification	Denotes the winner of the Basque rider classification
Denotes the winner of the points classification	Denotes the winner of the team classification
Denotes the winner of the mountains classification	Denotes the winner of the combativity award
Denotes the winner of the young rider classification	

=== General classification ===
Final general classification (1–10)
Rank	Rider	Team	Time
1	Primož Roglič (SLO)	Team Jumbo–Visma	19h 11' 36"
2	Jonas Vingegaard (DEN)	Team Jumbo–Visma	+ 52"
3	Tadej Pogačar (SLO)	UAE Team Emirates	+ 1' 07"
4	Adam Yates (GBR)	Ineos Grenadiers	+ 1' 26"
5	David Gaudu (FRA)	Groupama–FDJ	+ 1' 27"
6	Pello Bilbao (ESP)	Team Bahrain Victorious	+ 1' 28"
7	Alejandro Valverde (ESP)	Movistar Team	+ 1' 33"
8	Mikel Landa (ESP)	Team Bahrain Victorious	+ 2' 17"
9	Esteban Chaves (COL)	Team BikeExchange	+ 2' 38"
10	Ion Izagirre (ESP)	Astana–Premier Tech	+ 2' 59"

=== Points classification ===
Final points classification (1–10)
Rank	Rider	Team	Points
1	Primož Roglič (SLO)	Team Jumbo–Visma	106
2	Tadej Pogačar (SLO)	UAE Team Emirates	75
3	David Gaudu (FRA)	Groupama–FDJ	61
4	Jonas Vingegaard (DEN)	Team Jumbo–Visma	48
5	Alejandro Valverde (ESP)	Movistar Team	44
6	Brandon McNulty (USA)	UAE Team Emirates	42
7	Adam Yates (GBR)	Ineos Grenadiers	41
8	Alex Aranburu (ESP)	Astana–Premier Tech	37
9	Pello Bilbao (ESP)	Team Bahrain Victorious	36
10	Ion Izagirre (ESP)	Astana–Premier Tech	35

=== Mountains classification ===
Final mountains classification (1–10)
Rank	Rider	Team	Points
1	Primož Roglič (SLO)	Team Jumbo–Visma	34
2	Tadej Pogačar (SLO)	UAE Team Emirates	27
3	David Gaudu (FRA)	Groupama–FDJ	20
4	Hugh Carthy (GBR)	EF Education–Nippo	17
5	Antwan Tolhoek (NED)	Team Jumbo–Visma	15
6	Quinten Hermans (BEL)	Intermarché–Wanty–Gobert Matériaux	14
7	Brandon McNulty (USA)	UAE Team Emirates	12
8	Patrick Bevin (NZL)	Israel Start-Up Nation	11
9	Ben O'Connor (AUS)	AG2R Citroën Team	11
10	Alejandro Valverde (ESP)	Movistar Team	11

=== Young rider classification ===
Final young rider classification (1–10)
Rank	Rider	Team	Time
1	Jonas Vingegaard (DEN)	Team Jumbo–Visma	19h 12' 28"
2	Tadej Pogačar (SLO)	UAE Team Emirates	+ 15"
3	David Gaudu (FRA)	Groupama–FDJ	+ 35"
4	Mauri Vansevenant (BEL)	Deceuninck–Quick-Step	+ 2' 24"
5	Brandon McNulty (USA)	UAE Team Emirates	+ 6' 54"
6	Gino Mäder (SUI)	Team Bahrain Victorious	+ 11' 10"
7	Sergio Higuita (COL)	EF Education–Nippo	+ 16' 22"
8	Ilan Van Wilder (BEL)	Team DSM	+ 16' 38"
9	Mark Donovan (GBR)	Team DSM	+ 20' 30"
10	Eddie Dunbar (IRL)	Ineos Grenadiers	+ 28' 00"

=== Basque rider classification ===
Final Basque rider classification (1–10)
Rank	Rider	Team	Time
1	Pello Bilbao (ESP)	Team Bahrain Victorious	19h 13' 04"
2	Mikel Landa (ESP)	Team Bahrain Victorious	+ 49"
3	Ion Izagirre (ESP)	Astana–Premier Tech	+ 1' 31"
4	Jonathan Lastra (ESP)	Caja Rural–Seguros RGA	+ 15' 30"
5	Alex Aranburu (ESP)	Astana–Premier Tech	+ 23' 36"
6	Jon Agirre (ESP)	Equipo Kern Pharma	+ 27' 24"
7	Mikel Nieve (ESP)	Team BikeExchange	+ 29' 56"
8	Gotzon Martín (ESP)	Euskaltel–Euskadi	+ 33' 21"
9	Omar Fraile (ESP)	Astana–Premier Tech	+ 41' 43"
10	Txomin Juaristi (ESP)	Euskaltel–Euskadi	+ 42' 57"

=== Team classification ===
Final team classification (1–10)
Rank	Team	Time
1	Team Jumbo–Visma	57h 47' 23"
2	Team Bahrain Victorious	+ 3' 18"
3	UAE Team Emirates	+ 18' 04"
4	Astana–Premier Tech	+ 18' 26"
5	Deceuninck–Quick-Step	+ 20' 04"
6	Movistar Team	+ 23' 14"
7	Ineos Grenadiers	+ 26' 53"
8	Cofidis	+ 30' 30"
9	Bora–Hansgrohe	+ 32' 45"
10	Team BikeExchange	+ 53' 34"
