= List of wins by La Française des Jeux and its successors =

This is a comprehensive list of victories of the Groupama–FDJ United cycling team. The races are categorized according to the UCI rules.

== 1998 – La Française des Jeux ==
France Cyclo-cross Championships, Christophe Mengin
Lutterbach Cyclo-cross, Emmanuel Magnien
Stage 1 Critérium International, Emmanuel Magnien
Stage 5 Tour de Normandie, Franck Perque
Stage 4 GP du Midi-Libre, Damien Nazon
Stage 3 Vuelta Castilla y Leon, Christophe Mengin
Stages 1 & 5 Critérium du Dauphiné, Maximilian Sciandri
Stage 2 Critérium du Dauphiné, Damien Nazon
Coppa Sabatini, Emmanuel Magnien
Polymultipliée Lyonnaise, Emmanuel Magnien
Nouméa Six Days, Jean Michel Tessier

== 1999 – La Française des Jeux ==
Stages 3 & 5 Circuit Cycliste Sarthe, Damien Nazon
Stage 4 Quatre Jours de Dunkerque, Jimmy Casper
Amiens Criterium, Jimmy Casper
Villers-Cotterêts, Cyril Saugrain
Stages 1, 3, 4 & 8 Deutschland Tour, Jimmy Casper
Stage 7 Critérium du Dauphiné, Christophe Bassons
Callac Criterium, Stéphane Heulot
Vayrac Criterium, Stéphane Heulot
Overall Tour du Limousin, Stéphane Heulot

Stage 2, Stéphane Heulot

Stage 1 Tour du Poitou-Charentes et de la Vienne, Jean-Cyril Robin
GP Ouest France, Christophe Mengin
Stages 1 & 5 Trans Canada, Lars Michaelsen
Stages 3 & 10 Tour de l'Avenir, Bradley McGee
Stage 5 Tour de l'Avenir, Damien Nazon
Stage 4 Trans Canada, Jean-Cyril Robin

== 2000 – La Française des Jeux ==
GP d'Ouverture, Emmanuel Magnien
Stages 2 & 5 Étoile de Bessèges, Jean-Patrick Nazon
Le Samyn, Frank Høj
Stage 3 Quatre Jours de Dunkerque, Jean-Patrick Nazon
Stage 3a Tour de Picardie, Jean-Patrick Nazon
Stage 16 Giro d'Italia, Fabrizio Guidi
Stage 1 Critérium du Dauphiné, Frédéric Guesdon
Memorial Rik Van Steenbergen, Lars Michaelsen
Stage 2 Tour of Denmark, Lars Michaelsen
Stage 1a Tour de l'Ain, Jean Michel Tessier
Stage 1 Ronde van Nederland, Fabrizio Guidi
Stage 4 Giro della Provincia di Lucca, Fabrizio Guidi
Stage 5a Herald Sun Tour, Bradley McGee

== 2001 – La Française des Jeux ==
Stage 3 Tour Méditerranéen, Jimmy Casper
Stage 4 GP du Midi-Libre, Bradley McGee
Stage 5 GP du Midi-Libre, Sven Montgomery
Tartu Rattaralli, Jacky Durand
Tro-Bro Léon, Jacky Durand
Stage 2a Route du Sud, Jimmy Casper
Stage 2b Route du Sud, Bradley McGee
Stage 3 Tour du Poitou-Charentes et de la Vienne, Jimmy Casper
Stage 2 Tour de l'Avenir, Jean-Patrick Nazon
Paris–Brussel, Emmanuel Magnien
U23 Paris–Tours, Samuel Dumoulin
Aixe-sur-Vienne Cyclo-cross, Emmanuel Magnien
Tours Cyclo-cross, Emmanuel Magnien

== 2002 – La Française des Jeux ==
Stage 2 Tour of Qatar, Jean-Patrick Nazon
Cholet-Pays de Loire, Jimmy Casper
Dwars door Vlaanderen, Baden Cooke
Stage 1 Critérium International, Jean-Patrick Nazon
Stage 1 GP du Midi-Libre, Baden Cooke
Prologue Critérium du Dauphiné, Bradley McGee
Stage 1 Critérium du Dauphiné, Jacky Durand
Stage 5 Critérium du Dauphiné, Frédéric Guesdon
France National Road Race Championship, Nicolas Vogondy
Stage 7 Tour de France, Bradley McGee
Commonwealth Games Track Championships (Individual pursuit), Bradley McGee
Bol d'Or des Monédières, Nicolas Vogondy
Stage 4 Surrey League 5 Days, Bradley Wiggins
Stage 3 Tour de l'Avenir, Matthew Wilson
Stage 1 U23 Triptyque des Barrages, Philippe Gilbert
Stage 9 Tour de l'Avenir, Jimmy Casper
Kampioenschap van Vlaanderen, Jimmy Casper
Saran Criterium, Nicolas Vogondy
Stage 4 Circuit Franco-Belge, Sandy Casar
Overall Paris–Corrèze, Baden Cooke

Stage 1, Baden Cooke

Overall Herald Sun Tour, Baden Cooke

Stages 2 & 4, Baden Cooke
Stage 10, Matthew Wilson

Tours Cyclo-cross, Sandy Casar

== 2003 – FDJeux.com ==
Glenvale Crescent Criterium, Baden Cooke
Stages 1 & 4 Tour Down Under, Baden Cooke
Stage 3 Tour Méditerranéen, Baden Cooke
Stage 3a Giro Della Liguria, Jimmy Casper
Stage 1 Driedaagse van West-Vlaanderen, Jimmy Casper
Stage 1 GP Erik Breukink, Jimmy Casper
Stage 2 GP Erik Breukink, Bernhard Eisel
Cholet-Pays de Loire, Christophe Mengin
Stage 1 Circuit Cycliste Sarthe, Carlos Da Cruz
Stage 4 Tour de Suisse, Sandy Casar
Stage 8 Tour de Suisse, Bradley McGee
Stage 9 Tour de Suisse, Baden Cooke
Points classification Tour de France, Baden Cooke

Prologue, Bradley McGee
Stage 2, Baden Cooke

Profronde van Wateringen, Baden Cooke
Lamballe, Jean-Cyril Robin
Stage 3 Tour du Limousin, Nicolas Vogondy
Stage 4 Tour du Limousin, Bernhard Eisel
Stage 6 Ronde van Nederland, Bradley McGee
Saint-Eutrope – Quimper, Nicolas Fritsch
Stage 1 Tour de l'Avenir, Bradley Wiggins
Stage 9 Tour de l'Avenir, Philippe Gilbert
GP de Fourmies, Baden Cooke
Kampioenschap van Vlaanderen, Baden Cooke
Stage 3 Paris – Corrèze, Nicolas Fritsch
St Kilda Criterium, Matthew Wilson
Ghent Six Days, Bradley Wiggins
Bridel Cyclo-cross, Philippe Gilbert

== 2004 – FDJeux.com ==
Australia Road Race Championships, Matthew Wilson
Stage 3 Tour Down Under, Philippe Gilbert
Stage 6 Tour Down Under, Baden Cooke
Grand Prix d'Ouverture La Marseillaise, Baden Cooke
Stages 1 & 3 Tour Méditerranéen, Baden Cooke
Stage 3 Critérium des Espoirs, Bernhard Eisel
Stage 2 Driedaagse van De Panne, Baden Cooke
Overall Circuit de la Sarthe (cycling), Thomas Löfkvist

Stage 4, Thomas Löfkvist

Prologue Tour de Romandie, Bradley McGee
Prologue Giro d'Italia, Bradley McGee
Overall Route du Sud, Bradley McGee

Stage 2, Francis Mourey
Stage 3, Bradley McGee

Sweden Time Trial Championships, Thomas Löfkvist
Stage 5 Regio-Tour, Nicolas Vogondy
Stage 2 Tour du Poitou Charentes, Sandy Casar
Stage 10 Tour de l'Avenir, Thomas Löfkvist
Overall Paris–Corrèze, Philippe Gilbert
Stages 2, 3 & 5 Herald Sun Tour, Baden Cooke

== 2005 – La Française des Jeux ==
Overall Étoile de Bessèges, Freddy Bichot

Stage 1, Freddy Bichot

Stage 2 Tour Méditerranéen, Philippe Gilbert
Stage 4 GP Costa Azul, Bernhard Eisel
Stages 1 & 4 Volta ao Algarve, Bernhard Eisel
Tour du Haut Var, Philippe Gilbert
Trophée des Grimpeurs, Philippe Gilbert
Stage 2 Four Days of Dunkirk, Philippe Gilbert
GP de Villers-Cotterêts, Bradley McGee
Stage 1 Tour de Suisse, Bernhard Eisel
Stage 3 Tour de Suisse, Bradley McGee
Overall Route du Sud, Sandy Casar
Finland Road Race Championships, Jussi Veikkanen
Polynormande, Philippe Gilbert
Overall Paris–Corrèze, Frédéric Finot

Stage 3, Frédéric Finot

Stage 1 Tour de Pologne, Baden Cooke
Stages 4 & 5 Herald Sun Tour, Baden Cooke

== 2006 – La Française des Jeux ==
Overall La Tropicale Amissa Bongo, Jussi Veikkanen

Prologue, Frédéric Guesdon
Stage 1, Jussi Veikkanen
Stage 2, Lilian Jégou

Stage 4 Tour of Qatar, Bernhard Eisel
Stage 3 Étoile de Bessèges, Eric Leblacher
Stage 5 Tour Méditerranéen, Mathieu Ladagnous
Stage 2 Volta ao Algarve, Bernhard Eisel
Omloop Het Volk, Philippe Gilbert
Stage 2 Driedaagse van De Panne, Bernhard Eisel
Stage 2 Critérium du Dauphiné Libéré, Philippe Gilbert
Sweden Time Trial Championships, Gustav Larsson
Sweden Road Race Championships, Thomas Löfkvist
Finland Road Race Championships, Jussi Veikkanen
Stage 7 Eneco Tour, Philippe Gilbert
Stage 2 Tour du Poitou-Charentes, Jussi Veikkanen
Stage 1 Tour de l'Avenir, Mickaël Delage
Stage 8 Tour de l'Avenir, Rémy Di Gregorio
Grand Prix de Fourmies, Philippe Gilbert
Grand Prix de Wallonie, Philippe Gilbert
Paris–Tours, Frédéric Guesdon

== 2007 – La Française des Jeux ==
Overall La Tropicale Amissa Bongo, Frédéric Guesdon

Stage 4, Lilian Jégou

Stage 4 Étoile de Bessèges, Christophe Mengin
Stage 5 Étoile de Bessèges, Sébastien Chavanel
Stage 3 Critérium International, Thomas Löfkvist
Paris–Camembert, Sébastien Joly
Grand Prix de Denain, Sébastien Chavanel
Overall Four Days of Dunkirk, Mathieu Ladagnous

Stage 5, Mathieu Ladagnous

Stage 3 Tour de Picardie, Sébastien Chavanel
France Time Trial Championships, Benoît Vaugrenard
Stage 18 Tour de France, Sandy Casar
Polynormande, Benoît Vaugrenard
Stage 1 Tour du Limousin, Philippe Gilbert
Stage 3 Tour du Limousin, Lilian Jégou
Stage 3 Tour du Poitou-Charentes, Sébastien Chavanel
Stage 5 Tour du Poitou-Charentes, Jean-Eudes Demaret

== 2008 – La Française des Jeux ==
Overall La Tropicale Amissa Bongo, Lilian Jégou
Trofeo Mallorca, Philippe Gilbert
Trofeo Soller, Philippe Gilbert
Omloop Het Volk, Philippe Gilbert
Le Samyn, Philippe Gilbert
Stage 2 Driedaagse van West-Vlaanderen, Yauheni Hutarovich
Tro-Bro Léon, Frédéric Guesdon
Overall Tour de Picardie, Sébastien Chavanel

Stage 4, Sébastien Chavanel

Stage 4 Route du Sud, Jussi Veikkanen
Belarus Road Race Championships, Yauheni Hutarovich
Finland, Road Race Championships, Jussi Veikkanen
Stage 4 Tour de Wallonie, Gianni Meersman
Polynormande, Arnaud Gérard
Stages 2 & 4 Vuelta a Burgos, Yauheni Hutarovich
Stage 4 Tour du Limousin, Benoît Vaugrenard
Stage 6 Deutschland Tour, Jussi Veikkanen
Overall Tour du Poitou-Charentes, Benoît Vaugrenard

Stage 3, Benoît Vaugrenard

Paris–Tours, Philippe Gilbert

== 2009 – La Française des Jeux ==
Overall La Tropicale Amissa Bongo, Mathieu Ladagnous

Stage 1, Mathieu Ladagnous
Stage 6, Yauheni Hutarovich

Stages 1 & 5 Tour Méditerranéen, Yauheni Hutarovich
Stage 5 Paris–Nice, Jérémy Roy
Brabantse Pijl, Anthony Geslin
Route Adélie de Vitré, Jérôme Coppel
Stage 4 Circuit de la Sarthe, Anthony Roux
Stage 4 Tour de Picardie, Yoann Offredo
Stage 2 Circuit de Lorraine, Yauheni Hutarovich
Stage 5 Circuit de Lorraine, Sébastien Joly
Belarus Road Race Championships, Yauheni Hutarovich
Stage 16 Tour de France, Sandy Casar
Polynormande, Mathieu Ladagnous
Stage 2 Paris–Corrèze, Wesley Sulzberger
Stage 17 Vuelta a España, Anthony Roux
GP de la Somme, Yauheni Hutarovich
Grand Prix d'Isbergues, Benoît Vaugrenard

== 2010 – La Française des Jeux / FDJ ==
Stage 1 & 3 Tour Méditerranéen, Yauheni Hutarovich
Stage 2 Tour Méditerranéen, Jussi Veikkanen
Stage 1 Volta ao Algarve, Benoît Vaugrenard
Overall Tour du Haut Var, Christophe Le Mével

Stage 2, Christophe Le Mével

Tro-Bro Léon, Jérémy Roy
Stage 5 Four Days of Dunkirk, Benoît Vaugrenard
Stage 1 Circuit de Lorraine, Yauheni Hutarovich
Stage 5 Circuit de Lorraine, Anthony Roux
Grand Prix de Plumelec-Morbihan, Wesley Sulzberger
Finland, Road Race Championships, Jussi Veikkanen
Stage 9 Tour de France, Sandy Casar
Stage 3 Tour de Pologne, Yauheni Hutarovich
Stage 2 Paris–Corrèze, Arthur Vichot
Stage 1 Tour du Poitou Charentes et de la Vienne, Anthony Roux
Stage 2 Vuelta a España, Yauheni Hutarovich

== 2011 – FDJ ==
Stage 1 La Tropicale Amissa Bongo, Geoffrey Soupe
Stage 3 La Tropicale Amissa Bongo, Nacer Bouhanni
Grand Prix d'Ouverture La Marseillaise, Jérémy Roy
Stage 1 Étoile de Bessèges, Yauheni Hutarovich
Boucles du Sud Ardèche, Arthur Vichot
Overall Circuit de la Sarthe (cycling), Anthony Roux

Stage 4, Anthony Roux

Overall Circuit des Ardennes, Gianni Meersman

Stage 2, Gianni Meersman

Paris–Camembert, Sandy Casar
Overall Circuit de Lorraine, Anthony Roux

Stages 1 & 4, Anthony Roux

Stage 1 Tour de Wallonie, Mathieu Ladagnous
Overall Tour Alsace, Thibaut Pinot

Stage 1, Geoffrey Soupe
Stage 5, Thibaut Pinot

Stages 2 & 4 Tour de l'Ain, Thibaut Pinot
Coppa Bernocchi, Yauheni Hutarovich
Stages 3 & 4 Tour du Limousin, Mathieu Ladagnous
Stage 2 Tour du Poitou-Charentes, Yauheni Hutarovich
Overall Settimana Lombarda, Thibaut Pinot

Stage 1, Thibaut Pinot

Tour du Doubs, Arthur Vichot
GP de la Somme, Anthony Roux
Nationale Sluitingsprijs, Yauheni Hutarovich

== 2012 – FDJ–BigMat ==
Belarus Road Race Championships, Yauheni Hutarovich
France Road Race Championships, Nacer Bouhanni
Stage 1 Étoile de Bessèges, Nacer Bouhanni
Stage 6 Tour of Qatar, Arnaud Démare
Les Boucles du Sud Ardèche, Rémi Pauriol
Le Samyn, Arnaud Démare
Stage 2 Driedaagse van West-Vlaanderen, Arnaud Démare
Cholet-Pays de Loire, Arnaud Démare
Stage 3 Critérium International, Pierrick Fédrigo
Overall Circuit de Lorraine, Nacer Bouhanni

Stage 1, Nacer Bouhanni

Stage 5 Critérium du Dauphiné, Arthur Vichot
Stage 2 Route du Sud, Arnaud Démare
Halle–Ingooigem, Nacer Bouhanni
Stage 8 Tour de France, Thibaut Pinot
Stage 15 Tour de France, Pierrick Fédrigo
Stage 1 Tour de Wallonie, Nacer Bouhanni
Stage 2 Paris–Corrèze, Kenny Elissonde
Stages 1 & 2a Tour de l'Ain, Yauheni Hutarovich
Stage 5 Tour de l'Ain, Thibaut Pinot
Stage 4 Tour du Limousin, Jérémy Roy
Vattenfall Cyclassics, Arnaud Démare
Stage 4 Tour de l'Eurometropole, Nacer Bouhanni

== 2013 – FDJ / FDJ.fr ==
France Cyclo-Cross Championships, Francis Mourey
Stage 6 (ITT) Étoile de Bessèges, Anthony Roux
Stage 6 Tour of Oman, Nacer Bouhanni
Overall Tour du Haut Var, Arthur Vichot
Stage 1 Paris–Nice, Nacer Bouhanni
Finland Road Race Championships, Jussi Veikkanen
Val d'Ille U Classic 35, Nacer Bouhanni
Stage 2 Circuit de la Sarthe, Nacer Bouhanni
Paris–Camembert, Pierrick Fédrigo
Grand Prix de Denain, Arnaud Démare
Tro-Bro Léon, Francis Mourey
La Roue Tourangelle, Mickaël Delage
Overall Four Days of Dunkirk, Arnaud Démare

Stages 1, 2 & 3, Arnaud Démare

Boucles de l'Aulne, Mathieu Ladagnous
Stage 4 Tour de Suisse, Arnaud Démare
France Road Race Championships, Arthur Vichot
RideLondon-Surrey Classic, Arnaud Démare
Stage 4 Vuelta a Burgos, Anthony Roux
Stage 2 Eneco Tour, Arnaud Démare
Stage 3 Tour du Limousin, Mathieu Ladagnous
Stages 1, 2 & 3 Tour du Poitou-Charentes, Nacer Bouhanni
Grand Prix de Fourmies, Nacer Bouhanni
Stage 15 Vuelta a España, Alexandre Geniez
Stage 20 Vuelta a España, Kenny Elissonde
Grand Prix d'Isbergues, Arnaud Démare
Tour de Vendée, Nacer Bouhanni
Stages 2 & 3 Tour of Beijing, Nacer Bouhanni

== 2014 – FDJ.fr ==
France Cyclo-Cross Championships, Francis Mourey
Stage 2 Étoile de Bessèges, Nacer Bouhanni
Stage 6 Tour of Qatar, Arnaud Démare
Stage 1 Paris–Nice, Nacer Bouhanni
Stage 8 Paris–Nice, Arthur Vichot
Stage 1 Critérium International, Nacer Bouhanni
Stage 1 Circuit de la Sarthe, Nacer Bouhanni
Grand Prix de Denain, Nacer Bouhanni
Overall Four Days of Dunkirk, Arnaud Démare

Stages 1 & 2, Arnaud Démare

Points classification Giro d'Italia, Nacer Bouhanni

Stages 4, 7 & 10, Nacer Bouhanni

Overall Tour de Picardie, Arnaud Démare

Stages 2 & 3, Arnaud Démare

Halle–Ingooigem, Arnaud Démare
Finland Road Race Championships, Jussi Veikkanen
France Road Race Championships, Arnaud Démare
Young rider classification Tour de France, Thibaut Pinot
Stage 4 Eneco Tour, Nacer Bouhanni
Stages 2 & 8 Vuelta a España, Nacer Bouhanni
Kampioenschap van Vlaanderen, Arnaud Démare
Grand Prix d'Isbergues, Arnaud Démare
Overall Tour de l'Eurométropole, Arnaud Démare

Stages 1, 2 & 4, Arnaud Démare

== 2015 – FDJ ==
Stage 2a Circuit de la Sarthe, Anthony Roux
La Roue Tourangelle, Lorrenzo Manzin
Tro-Bro Léon, Alexandre Geniez
Stage 5 Tour de Romandie, Thibaut Pinot
Stages 2 & 3 Baloise Belgium Tour, Arnaud Démare
Prologue Boucles de la Mayenne, Johan Le Bon
Stage 5 Tour de Suisse, Thibaut Pinot
Stage 20 Tour de France, Thibaut Pinot
Stage 5 Eneco Tour, Johan Le Bon
Overall Tour de l'Ain, Alexandre Geniez

Stage 3, Alexandre Geniez

Stage 3 Tour du Poitou-Charentes, Marc Sarreau
Overall Tour du Gévaudan Languedoc-Roussillon, Thibaut Pinot

Stage 1, Thibaut Pinot

== 2016 – FDJ ==
Stage 1 La Méditerranéenne (TTT)
Stage 2 La Méditerranéenne, Arnaud Démare
Overall Tour du Haut Var, Arthur Vichot

Stage 2, Arthur Vichot

Stage 1 Paris–Nice, Arnaud Démare
Milan–San Remo, Arnaud Démare
Overall Critérium International, Thibaut Pinot

Stages 2 (ITT) & 3, Thibaut Pinot

Stage 6 Critérium du Dauphiné, Thibaut Pinot
Overall Circuit de la Sarthe, Marc Fournier

Stage 1, Marc Fournier

Stage 3 (ITT) Tour de Romandie, Thibaut Pinot
Stage 6 Critérium du Dauphiné, Thibaut Pinot
Stage 5 Route du Sud, Arnaud Démare
France Time Trial Championships, Thibaut Pinot
Lithuania Time Trial Championships, Ignatas Konovalovas
France Road Race Championships, Arthur Vichot
Stage 4 Tour de l'Ain, Alexandre Geniez
Stage 3 Vuelta a España, Alexandre Geniez
Binche–Chimay–Binche, Arnaud Démare

== 2017 – FDJ ==
Grand Prix d'Ouverture La Marseillaise, Arthur Vichot
Stages 1 & 4 Étoile de Bessèges, Arnaud Démare
Stage 2 Vuelta a Andalucía, Thibaut Pinot
Overall Tour du Haut Var, Arthur Vichot
Stage 1 Paris–Nice, Arnaud Démare
Stage 1 Volta a Catalunya, Davide Cimolai
Grand Prix de Denain, Arnaud Démare
Stage 5 Tour of the Alps, Thibaut Pinot
Stage 2 Four Days of Dunkirk, Arnaud Démare
Stage 5 Four Days of Dunkirk, Ignatas Konovalovas
Stage 20 Giro d'Italia, Thibaut Pinot
Boucles de l'Aulne, Odd Christian Eiking
Prologue & Stage 1 Boucles de la Mayenne, Johan Le Bon
Stage 2 Critérium du Dauphiné, Arnaud Démare
Halle–Ingooigem, Arnaud Démare
Sweden Time Trial Championships, Tobias Ludvigsson
Lithuania Time Trial Championships, Ignatas Konovalovas
France Road Race Championships, Arnaud Démare
Lithuania Road Race Championships, Ignatas Konovalovas
Stage 4 Tour de France, Arnaud Démare
Overall Tour de l'Ain, Thibaut Pinot

Prologue, Johan Le Bon
Stage 3, David Gaudu

== 2018 – FDJ / Groupama–FDJ ==
Stages 1 & 3 Étoile de Bessèges, Marc Sarreau
Stage 1 Paris–Nice, Arnaud Démare
Stage 6 Paris–Nice, Rudy Molard
La Roue Tourangelle, Marc Sarreau
Stage 2 Circuit Cycliste Sarthe – Pays de la Loire, Marc Sarreau
Overall Tour of the Alps, Thibaut Pinot
Stage 1 4 Jours de Dunkerque, Marc Sarreau
Stage 6 4 Jours de Dunkerque, Olivier Le Gac
Overall Tour de l'Ain, Arthur Vichot

Stage 3, Arthur Vichot

Stage 8 Tour de Suisse, Arnaud Démare
Stage 4 Route d'Occitanie, Anthony Roux
Sweden Time Trial Championships, Tobias Ludvigsson
Canada Road Race Championships, Antoine Duchesne
Austria Time Trial Championships, Georg Preidler
Switzerland Road Race Championships, Steve Morabito
France Road Race Championships, Anthony Roux
Paris-Chauny, Ramon Sinkeldam
Stage 18 Tour de France, Arnaud Démare
Stage 6 Tour de Pologne, Georg Preidler
Stage 1 Tour du Limousin, Anthony Roux
Overall Tour Poitou-Charentes en Nouvelle Aquitaine, Arnaud Démare

Stages 1, 2, 3, 4 (ITT) & 5, Arnaud Démare

France U23 Time Trial Championships, Alexys Brunel
Stages 15 & 19 Vuelta a España, Thibaut Pinot
Paris–Bourges, Valentin Madouas
Milano–Torino, Thibaut Pinot
Il Lombardia, Thibaut Pinot

== 2019 – Groupama–FDJ ==
Stage 3 Étoile de Bessèges, Marc Sarreau
Stage 3 (ITT) Volta ao Algarve, Stefan Küng
Overall Tour du Haut Var, Thibaut Pinot

Stage 3, Thibaut Pinot

Cholet–Pays de la Loire, Marc Sarreau
Route Adélie de Vitré, Marc Sarreau
Stage 2 Tour de Romandie, Stefan Küng
Stage 3 Tour de Romandie, David Gaudu
Stage 10 Giro d'Italia, Arnaud Démare
Overall Tour de l'Ain, Thibaut Pinot

Stage 3, Thibaut Pinot

Stage 2 Route d'Occitanie, Arnaud Démare
France National Time Trial Championships, Benjamin Thomas
Luxembourg National U23 Time Trial Championships, Kevin Geniets
Switzerland National Time Trial Championships, Stefan Küng
Switzerland National Road Race Championships, Sébastien Reichenbach
Stage 14 Tour de France, Thibaut Pinot
Stage 4 Tour de Wallonie, Arnaud Démare
Sweden National Time Trial Championships, Tobias Ludvigsson
Tour du Doubs, Stefan Küng
Stage 1b (ITT) Okolo Slovenska, Stefan Küng
Stage 3 Okolo Slovenska, Arnaud Démare
Tour de Vendée, Marc Sarreau
Paris–Bourges, Marc Sarreau

== 2020 – Groupama–FDJ ==
Stage 1 Étoile de Bessèges, Alexys Brunel
Switzerland National Time Trial Championships, Stefan Küng
Milano–Torino, Arnaud Démare
Overall Tour de Wallonie, Arnaud Démare

Stages 2 & 4

France National Road Race Championships, Arnaud Démare
Luxembourg National Road Race Championships, Kevin Geniets
UEC European Time Trial Championships, Stefan Küng
Overall Tour Poitou-Charentes en Nouvelle-Aquitaine, Arnaud Démare

Stages 1, 2 & 4

Stage 2 Tour de Luxembourg, Arnaud Démare
Points classification, Giro d'Italia, Arnaud Démare

Stages 4, 6, 7 & 11, Arnaud Démare

Switzerland National Road Race Championships, Stefan Küng
Stages 11 & 17 Vuelta a España, David Gaudu

== 2021 – Groupama–FDJ ==
Classic Sud-Ardèche, David Gaudu
La Roue Tourangelle, Arnaud Démare
Stage 6 Tour of the Basque Country, David Gaudu
Overall Volta a la Comunitat Valenciana, Stefan Küng

Stage 1, Miles Scotson
Stages 2 & 5, Arnaud Démare
Stage 4 (ITT), Stefan Küng

Overall Boucles de la Mayenne, Arnaud Démare

Stages 2, 3 & 4, Arnaud Démare

Stage 1 (ITT) Tour de Suisse, Stefan Küng
Stage 2 Route d'Occitanie, Arnaud Démare
Switzerland National Time Trial Championships, Stefan Küng
France National Time Trial Championships, Benjamin Thomas
Luxembourg National Time Trial Championships, Kevin Geniets
Luxembourg National Road Race Championships, Kevin Geniets
Lithuania National Road Race Championships, Ignatas Konovalovas
Polynormande, Valentin Madouas
UEC European Time Trial Championships, Stefan Küng
Stage 5 Tour de Luxembourg, David Gaudu
Paris–Tours, Arnaud Démare
Chrono des Nations, Stefan Küng

== 2022 – Groupama–FDJ ==
Stage 2 Volta ao Algarve, David Gaudu
Stage 5 Tour of the Alps, Thibaut Pinot
Points classification, Giro d'Italia, Arnaud Démare

Stages 5, 6 & 13, Arnaud Démare

Stage 3 Critérium du Dauphiné, David Gaudu
Stage 1 Route d'Occitanie, Arnaud Démare
Stage 7 Tour de Suisse, Thibaut Pinot
France National Time Trial Championships, Bruno Armirail
Hungary National Road Race Championships, Attila Valter
Stage 7 Tour de Pologne, Arnaud Démare
Stage 1 Tour de l'Ain, Jake Stewart
Overall Tour Poitou-Charentes en Nouvelle Aquitaine, Stefan Küng

Stage 4 (ITT), Stefan Küng

Tour du Doubs, Valentin Madouas
Stages 1 & 5 Tour de Luxembourg, Valentin Madouas
Grand Prix d'Isbergues, Arnaud Démare
Paris–Tours, Arnaud Démare
Chrono des Nations, Stefan Küng

== 2023 – Groupama–FDJ ==
Stage 5 (ITT) Volta ao Algarve, Stefan Küng
Cholet-Pays de la Loire, Laurence Pithie
Tour du Finistère, Paul Penhoët
Overall Four Days of Dunkirk, Romain Grégoire

Stage 2, Romain Grégoire

Stage 2 Boucles de la Mayenne, Arnaud Démare
Brussels Cycling Classic, Arnaud Démare
Stage 1 (ITT) Tour de Suisse, Stefan Küng
Mont Ventoux Dénivelé Challenge, Lenny Martinez
France National Road Race Championships, Valentin Madouas
Overall Tour de l'Ain, Michael Storer

Stage 1, Jake Stewart
Stage 3, Michael Storer

Overall Tour du Limousin, Romain Grégoire

Stages 1 & 3, Romain Grégoire

Stage 2 Tour Poitou-Charentes en Nouvelle Aquitaine, Paul Penhoët
Stage 3b (ITT) Tour Poitou-Charentes en Nouvelle Aquitaine, Bruno Armirail
Bretagne Classic Ouest-France, Valentin Madouas

== 2024 – Groupama–FDJ ==
Cadel Evans Great Ocean Road Race, Laurence Pithie
Grand Prix La Marseillaise, Kevin Geniets
Classic Var, Lenny Martinez
Trofeo Laigueglia, Lenny Martinez
Stage 5 Tour of the Basque Country, Romain Grégoire
Classic Grand Besançon Doubs, Lenny Martinez
Tour du Jura, David Gaudu
Tour du Doubs, Lenny Martinez
Mercan'Tour Classic, Lenny Martinez
Switzerland National Time Trial Championships, Stefan Küng
Luxembourg National Road Race Championships, Kevin Geniets
Stage 5 Tour de Wallonie, Samuel Watson
Stage 21 (ITT) Vuelta a España, Stefan Küng
Stage 5 Tour de Luxembourg, David Gaudu
Chrono des Nations, Stefan Küng

== 2025 – Groupama–FDJ ==
Stage 3 Tour of Oman, David Gaudu
Faun-Ardèche Classic, Romain Grégoire

== 2026 – Groupama–FDJ ==
1st La Drôme Classic, Romain Grégoire

== Supplementary statistics ==
=== 1997 to 2017 ===
Grand Tours by highest finishing position
Race	1997	1998	1999	2000	2001	2002	2003	2004	2005	2006	2007	2008	2009	2010	2011	2012	2013	2014	2015	2016	2017
Giro d'Italia	–	–	–	58	–	–	13	8	71	6	43	27	–	–	–	25	19	13	9	91	4
Tour de France	20	13	14	76	66	19	78	16	29	62	64	13	9	22	14	10	29	3	16	14	36
Vuelta a España	–	–	–	–	–	–	–	–	–	33	54	19	25	13	–	23	7	77	16	20	52
Major week-long stage races by highest finishing position
Race	1997	1998	1999	2000	2001	2002	2003	2004	2005	2006	2007	2008	2009	2010	2011	2012	2013	2014	2015	2016	2017
Tour Down Under	Did not Exist		–	5	–	21	23	3	9	–	80	4	5	20	–	25	10	19	19	9	19
Paris–Nice	12	15	15	23	22	2	–	19	12	12	12	31	10	30	34	6	13	3	12	81	16
Tirreno–Adriatico	–	43	42	44	20	–	–	–	53	39	65	10	44	32	–	50	20	14	4	4	3
Volta a Catalunya	–	–	–	–	–	–	–	–	44	24	11	14	12	10	–	60	8	13	55	58	38
Tour of the Basque Country	33	53	–	–	–	–	–	–	16	50	22	8	12	6	–	25	40	9	10	4	24
Tour de Romandie	7	43	–	15	6	–	25	9	40	36	22	6	13	14	–	11	12	10	4	2	39
Critérium du Dauphiné	12	33	5	19	4	10	20	17	40	19	17	13	10	14	16	40	12	38	44	16	91
Tour de Suisse	83	15	60	4	10	3	11	–	8	21	24	28	20	26	–	19	4	15	4	25	21
Tour de Pologne	–	–	–	14	–	–	–	–	4	11	52	53	43	49	–	28	16	63	23	52	13
Eneco Tour	–	–	23	5	–	–	2	–	29	4	37	38	26	27	–	32	27	14	24	20	34
Monument races by highest finishing position
Monument	1997	1998	1999	2000	2001	2002	2003	2004	2005	2006	2007	2008	2009	2010	2011	2012	2013	2014	2015	2016	2017
Milan–San Remo	15	2	21	42	–	–	12	14	6	23	21	3	27	12	7	27	19	16	32	1	6
Tour of Flanders	11	4	10	20	33	20	6	69	13	15	25	15	29	18	15	16	5	21	23	44	34
Paris–Roubaix	1	21	11	17	17	OTL	12	18	11	5	25	11	12	19	11	12	26	12	32	83	6
Liège–Bastogne–Liège	5	7	31	36	–	–	88	40	87	38	16	14	8	13	36	21	11	18	59	57	17
Giro di Lombardia	8	22	35	14	–	–	–	–	42	DNF	70	88	46	DNF	18	DNF	12	14	3	23	5
Classics by highest finishing position
Classic	1997	1998	1999	2000	2001	2002	2003	2004	2005	2006	2007	2008	2009	2010	2011	2012	2013	2014	2015	2016	2017
Omloop Het Nieuwsblad	9	14	16	–	15	40	18	–	16	1	11	1	20	11	4	8	28	10	10	10	20
Kuurne–Brussels–Kuurne	45	3	4	9	28	15	6	35	15	19	4	12	7	23	2	2	–	22	31	11	6
Strade Bianche	Did not Exist										–	–	–	–	–	–	–	–	–	–	9
E3 Harelbeke	43	25	6	12	–	18	5	52	16	15	7	22	12	12	6	7	13	31	16	60	18
Gent–Wevelgem	–	16	18	11	–	14	–	DNF	6	7	5	51	13	OTL	11	8	6	2	15	5	78
Amstel Gold Race	5	16	62	21	–	–	–	34	88	68	76	14	12	27	–	41	22	15	42	19	14
La Flèche Wallonne	11	11	39	71	–	–	–	40	19	21	19	20	20	13	36	23	18	44	22	44	8
Clásica de San Sebastián	1	6	8	58	–	–	–	–	43	12	–	DNF	12	21	–	32	10	12	20	11	7
Paris–Tours	2	10	13	14	31	2	4	12	25	1	13	1	10	7	6	16	3	25	12	2	12

=== 2018 to present ===
Grand Tours by highest finishing position
Race	2018	2019	2020	2021	2022	2023
Giro d'Italia	22	13	77	14	35	5
Tour de France	34	13	24	11	4	9
Vuelta a España	6	21	8	58	17	24
Major week-long stage races by highest finishing position
Races	2018	2019	2020	2021	2022	2023
Tour Down Under	28	23	20	NH		12
Paris–Nice	15	7	5	74	19	2
Tirreno–Adriatico	30	5	18	16	8	10
Volta a Catalunya	10	11	NH	26	14	12
Tour of the Basque Country	33	17	NH	5	18	4
Tour de Romandie	20	5	NH	23	13	5
Critérium du Dauphiné	18	5	2	9	17	18
Tour de Suisse	10	18	NH	40	5	15
Tour de Pologne	3	33	15	18	10	12
BinckBank Tour	25	8	3	5	NH	34
Monument races by highest finishing position
Monument	2018	2019	2020	2021	2022	2023
Milan–San Remo	3	32	24	26	10	29
Tour of Flanders	15	28	14	39	3	6
Paris–Roubaix	26	11	NH	34	3	5
Liège–Bastogne–Liège	26	6	13	3	16	5
Il Lombardia	1	10	21	7	8	27
Classics by highest finishing position
Classic	2018	2019	2020	2021	2022	2023
Omloop Het Nieuwsblad	9	18	9	2	12	17
Kuurne–Brussels–Kuurne	2	21	12	20	30	18
Strade Bianche	20	15	14	16	4	2
E3 Harelbeke	56	34	NH	20	3	6
Gent–Wevelgem	3	16	5	6	10	33
Amstel Gold Race	15	8	NH	23	8	11
La Flèche Wallonne	13	19	11	7	8	24
Clásica de San Sebastián	3	12	NH	38	12	36
Paris–Tours	5	4	4	1	1	2

Legend
—	Did not compete
DNF	Did not finish
NH	Not held
