= 2024 Groupama–FDJ season =

Groupama–FDJ
- 2024 season
- UCI code: GFC
- Status: UCI WorldTeam
- Manager: Marc Madiot (FRA)
- Main sponsor(s): Groupama; Française des Jeux
- Based: France
- Bicycles: Wilier Triestina
- Groupset: Shimano

Season victories
- One-day races: 9
- Stage race stages: 4
- National Championships: 2
- Most wins: Lenny Martinez (5)

The 2024 season for the Groupama–FDJ team is the team's 28th season in existence and the 20th consecutive season as a UCI WorldTeam.

== Team roster ==
As of 6 March 2024.

| Rider | Date of birth |
|---|---|
| Lewis Askey (GBR) | 4 May 2001 (aged 22) |
| Cyril Barthe (FRA) | 14 February 1996 (aged 27) |
| Sven Erik Bystrøm (NOR) | 21 January 1992 (aged 31) |
| Clément Davy (FRA) | 17 July 1998 (aged 25) |
| David Gaudu (FRA) | 10 October 1996 (aged 27) |
| Kévin Geniets (LUX) | 9 January 1997 (aged 26) |
| Lorenzo Germani (ITA) | 3 March 2002 (aged 21) |
| Romain Grégoire (FRA) | 21 January 2003 (aged 20) |
| Thibaud Gruel (Note: Joined on 6 March.) (FRA) | 1 May 2004 (aged 19) |
| Ignatas Konovalovas (LIT) | 8 December 1985 (aged 38) |
| Stefan Küng (SUI) | 16 November 1993 (aged 30) |
| Olivier Le Gac (FRA) | 27 August 1993 (aged 30) |
| Eddy Le Huitouze (FRA) | 3 April 2003 (aged 20) |
| Fabian Lienhard (SUI) | 3 September 1993 (aged 30) |

| Rider | Date of birth |
|---|---|
| Valentin Madouas (FRA) | 12 July 1996 (aged 27) |
| Lenny Martinez (FRA) | 11 July 2003 (aged 20) |
| Rudy Molard (FRA) | 17 September 1989 (aged 34) |
| Quentin Pacher (FRA) | 6 January 1992 (aged 31) |
| Enzo Paleni (FRA) | 30 May 2002 (aged 21) |
| Paul Penhoët (FRA) | 28 December 2001 (aged 22) |
| Laurence Pithie (NZL) | 17 July 2002 (aged 21) |
| Rémy Rochas (FRA) | 18 May 1996 (aged 27) |
| Clément Russo (FRA) | 20 January 1995 (aged 28) |
| Marc Sarreau (FRA) | 10 June 1993 (aged 30) |
| Reuben Thompson (NZL) | 15 February 2001 (aged 22) |
| Lars van den Berg (NED) | 7 July 1998 (aged 25) |
| Matthew Walls (GBR) | 20 April 1998 (aged 25) |
| Samuel Watson (GBR) | 24 September 2001 (aged 22) |

== Season victories ==
| Date | Race | Competition | Rider | Country | Location | Ref. |
|---|---|---|---|---|---|---|
| 28 January | Cadel Evans Great Ocean Road Race | UCI World Tour | Laurence Pithie (NZL) | Australia | Geelong | |
| 28 January | Grand Prix La Marseillaise | UCI Europe Tour | Kevin Geniets (LUX) | France | Marseille | |
| 16 February | Classic Var | UCI Europe Tour | Lenny Martinez (FRA) | France | Mont Faron | |
| 28 February | Trofeo Laigueglia | UCI ProSeries | Lenny Martinez (FRA) | Italy | Laigueglia | |
| 5 April | Tour of the Basque Country, stage 5 | UCI World Tour | Romain Grégoire (FRA) | Spain | Amorebieta-Etxano | |
| 12 April | Classic Grand Besançon Doubs | UCI Europe Tour | Lenny Martinez (FRA) | France | Montfaucon | |
| 13 April | Tour du Jura | UCI Europe Tour | David Gaudu (FRA) | France | Salins-les-Bains | |
| 14 April | Tour du Doubs | UCI Europe Tour | Lenny Martinez (FRA) | France | Pontarlier | |
| 29 May | Mercan'Tour Classic | UCI Europe Tour | Lenny Martinez (FRA) | France | Valberg | |
| 26 July | Tour de Wallonie, stage 5 | UCI ProSeries | Samuel Watson (UK) | Belgium | Thuin | |
| 8 September | Vuelta a España, stage 21 (ITT) | UCI World Tour | Stefan Küng (SWI) | Spain | Madrid | |
| 22 September | Tour de Luxembourg, stage 5 | UCI ProSeries | David Gaudu (FRA) | Luxembourg | Luxembourg | |
| 13 October | Chrono des Nations | UCI Europe Tour | Stefan Küng (SWI) | France | Les Herbiers | |

== National, Continental, and World Champions ==
| Date | Discipline | Jersey | Rider | Country | Location | Ref. |
|---|---|---|---|---|---|---|
| 20 June | Swiss National Time Trial Championships | | Stefan Küng (SWI) | Switzerland | Aire-la-Ville | |
| 23 June | Luxembourg National Road Race Championships | | Kevin Geniets (LUX) | Luxembourg | Harlange | |
