= 2027 UCI Europe Tour =

Season of UCI Europe Tour

- Twenty-third edition of the UCI Europe Tour

Details
- Dates: 14 January – October 2027
- Location: Europe

The 2027 UCI Europe Tour is the 23rd season of the UCI Europe Tour.

Throughout the season, points are awarded to the top finishers of stages within stage races and the final general classification standings of each of the stages races and one-day events. The quality and complexity of a race also determined how many points were awarded to the top finishers, the higher the UCI rating of a race, the more points were awarded.

The UCI ratings from highest to lowest were as follows:

- Multi-day events: 2.Pro, 2.1 and 2.2
- One-day events: 1.Pro, 1.1 and 1.2

== Events ==
=== January ===
Races in the 2027 UCI Europe Tour
Race	Rating	Date	Winner	Team	Ref
(Spain) Vuelta Ciclista a Canarias	2.1	14–17 January	Cancelled		
(Spain) Clàssica Camp de Morvedre	1.1	22 January			
(Spain) Gran Premio Castellón	1.1	23 January			
(Spain) Clàssica Comunitat Valenciana	1.1	24 January			
(Spain) Trofeo Calvià	1.1	27 January			
(Spain) Trofeo Ses Salines	1.1	28 January			
(Spain) Trofeo Serra Tramuntana	1.1	29 January			
(Spain) Trofeo Pollença - Andratx	1.1	30 January			
(France) Grand Prix La Marseillaise	1.1	31 January			
(Spain) Trofeo Palma	1.1	31 January			

=== February ===
Races in the 2027 UCI Europe Tour
Race	Rating	Date	Winner	Team	Ref
(France) Etoile de Bessèges	2.1	3–7 February			
(Spain) Vuelta a Murcia	2.1	12–13 February			
(France) Tour de la Provence	2.1	12–14 February			
(Turkey) Grand Prix Antalya	1.2	13 February			
(Spain) Clásica Jaén Paraíso Interior	1.1	15 February			
(France) Classic Var	1.1	20 February			
(Turkey) Grand Prix Alaiye	1.2	20 February			
(France) Tour des Alpes-Maritimes	1.1	21 February			
(Turkey) Grand Prix Alanya	1.2	21 February			
(Italy) Giro di Sardegna	2.1	24–28 February			
(Turkey) Grand Prix Pedalia	1.2	27 February			

=== March ===
Races in the 2027 UCI Europe Tour
Race	Rating	Date	Winner	Team	Ref
(Belgium) Le Samyn	1.1	2 March			
(Turkey) Tour of Antalya	2.2	4–7 March			
(France) Tour des 100 Communes	1.2	6 March			
(Greece) Visit South Aegean GP	1.1	6 March			
(Netherlands) Ster van Zwolle	1.2	6 March			
(France) Grand Prix de la Ville de Lillers	1.2	7 March			
(Greece) Region on Dodecanese GP	1.1	7 March			
(Netherlands) Dwars door Drenthe	1.2	7 March			
(Greece) International Rhodes Grand Prix	1.2	13 March			
(Netherlands) Dorpenomloop Rucphen	1.2	14 March			
(Portugal) Classica da Arrábida	1.2	14 March			
(Italy) Gran Premio San Giuseppe	1.2U	14 March			
(Portugal) Volta ao Alentejo	2.1	17–21 March			
(Greece) International Tour of Rhodes	2.2	18–21 March			
(Belgium) Youngster Coast Challenge	1.2U	19 March			
(Italy) Memorial Polese	1.2	20 March			
(Belgium) Zuidkempense Pijl	1.2	21 March			
(Belgium) Grote Prijs Jean-Pierre Monseré	1.1	21 March			
(France) Cholet Agglo Tour	1.1	21 March			
(Italy) La Popolarissima	1.2	21 March			
(Slovenia) GP Slovenian Istria	1.2	21 March			
(Italy) Settimana Internazionale di Coppi e Bartali	2.1	24–28 March			
(Netherlands) Olympia's Tour	2.2	24–28 March			
(Turkey) Grand Prix Apollon Temple	1.2	27 March			
(France) La Roue Tourangelle	1.1	28 March			
(Slovenia) Velika Nagrada Novega Mesta	1.2	28 March			
(Italy) G.P. Emilia	1.1	29 March			
(Italy) Giro del Belvedere	1.2U	29 March			
(France) Paris–Camembert	1.1	30 March			
(Italy) Gran Premio Palio del Recioto	1.2U	30 March			

=== April ===
Races in the 2027 UCI Europe Tour
Race	Rating	Date	Winner	Team	Ref
(France) Route Adélie de Vitré	1.1	2 April			
(France) Boucle de l'Artois	1.2	3 April			
(Italy) Trofeo PIVA	1.2	3 April			
(Netherlands) Omloop van de Braakman	1.2	3 April			
(Turkey) Grand Prix Syedra Ancient City	1.2	3 April			
(Italy) Trofeo Città di San Vendemiano	1.2	4 April			
(France) Circuit des Ardennes	2.2	7–11 April			
(Turkey) Tour of Mersin	2.2	8–11 April			
(Italy) Giro della Città Metropolitana di Reggio Calabria	1.1	10 April			
(France) Paris–Roubaix Espoirs	1.2U	11 April			
(Belgium) Ronde van Limburg	1.1	14 April			
(France) Tour du Loir-et-Cher	2.2	14–17 April			
(Spain) O Gran Camiño	2.1	14–18 April			
(France) Classic Grand Besançon Doubs	1.1	16 April			
(France) Tour du Jura	1.1	17 April			
(Italy) Giro della Provincia di Biella	1.2	18 April			
(Switzerland) GP Berra Immobilier	1.2	18 April			
(Belgium) Monts et Châteaux Classic	1.2U	18 April			
Volta a Portugal do Futuro	2.2	22–25 April			
(United Kingdom) Rutland–Melton CiCLE Classic	1.2	25 April			
(Italy) Gran Premio della Liberazione	1.2U	25 April			
(Italy) Giro dell'Appennino	1.1	25 April			
(France) Tour de Bretagne	2.2	25 April – 1 May			
(Spain) Vuelta a Asturias	2.1	29 April – 2 May			

=== May ===
Races in the 2027 UCI Europe Tour
Race	Rating	Date	Winner	Team	Ref
(Austria) Grand Prix Vorarlberg	1.2	1 May			
(Belgium) Omloop van het Waasland	1.2	1 May			
(Netherlands) Ronde van Overijssel	1.2	1 May			
(Netherlands) Slag om Woensdrecht	1.2	2 May			
(Belgium) À travers les Hautes Fagnes	1.2	4 May			
(Belgium) Flèche Ardennaise	1.2	5 May			
Tour of Greece	2.1	5–9 May			
(Luxembourg) Flèche du Sud	2.1	5–9 May			
(Belgium) Circuit de Wallonie	1.1	6 May			
(Norway) Sundvolden GP	1.2	8 May			
(Belgium) Mur de Huy Classic	1.2U	8 May			
(Italy) Gran Premio Industrie del Marmo	1.2U	9 May			
(Norway) Ringerike GP	1.2	9 May			
(Switzerland) Radsportfest Märwil	1.1	9 May			
Baku-Khankendi Azerbaijan Cycling Race	2.1	9–13 May			
(Poland) Szlakiem Powiatów Łódzkich	2.2	12–15 May			
Tour of Bosnia and Herzegovina	2.2	13–15 May			
(France) Tour du Finistère	1.1	15 May			
(Italy) Circuito del Porto	1.2	16 May			
(Netherlands) Omloop der Kempen	1.2	16 May			
(Belgium) Grand Prix Criquielion	1.1	16 May			
(France) Boucles de l'Aulne	1.1	16 May			
(Belgium) Antwerp Port Epic	1.1	17 May			
(Spain) Clásica de Pascua	1.2	17 May			
(France) Ronde de l'Isard	2.2U	18–23 May			
(Portugal) GP Beiras e Serra da Estrela	2.1	20–23 May			
(Italy) Due Giorni Marchigiana	1.2	22 May			
(Netherlands) Arnhem–Veenendaal Classic	1.1	22 May			
(Italy) Due Giorni Marchigiana	1.2	23 May			
(France) Alpes Isère Tour	2.2	26–30 May			
(Austria) Oberösterreich Rundfahrt	2.2	27–30 May			
(Czech Republic) Peace Race	2.2U	27–30 May			
(Turkey) Grand Prix Kırıkkale	1.2	29 May			
(Belgium) Famenne Ardenne Classic	1.2	30 May			
(Turkey) Grand Prix Anadolu	1.2	30 May			
