= 2024 O Gran Camiño =

Spanish cycling race

2024 UCI Europe Tour

Race details
- Dates: 22–25 February 2024
- Stages: 3
- Distance: 471.2 km (292.8 mi)
- Winning time: 11h 20' 01"

Results
Jersey awarded to the overall winner	Winner	Jonas Vingegaard (DEN)	(Visma–Lease a Bike)
	Second	Lenny Martinez (FRA)	(Groupama–FDJ)
	Third	Egan Bernal (COL)	(Ineos Grenadiers)
Jersey awarded to the points classification winner	Points	Jonas Vingegaard (DEN)	(Visma–Lease a Bike)
Jersey awarded to the mountains classification winner	Mountains	Jonas Vingegaard (DEN)	(Visma–Lease a Bike)
Jersey awarded to the youth classification winner	Youth	Lenny Martinez (FRA)	(Groupama–FDJ)
	Team	(Netherlands) Visma–Lease a Bike	

The 2024 O Gran Camiño (English: The Great Way) was a road cycling stage race that took place from 22 to 25 February 2024 in the autonomous community of Galicia in northwestern Spain. The race was rated as a category 2.1 event on the 2024 UCI Europe Tour calendar and was the third edition of the O Gran Camiño.

== Teams ==
UCI WorldTeams

- Arkéa–B&B Hotels
- EF Education–EasyPost
- Ineos Grenadiers
- Groupama–FDJ
- Movistar Team
- Visma–Lease a Bike

UCI ProTeams

- Burgos BH
- Caja Rural–Seguros RGA
- Equipo Kern Pharma
- Euskaltel–Euskadi
- Q36.5 Pro Cycling Team
- Polti–Kometa

UCI Continental Teams

- AP Hotels & Resorts / Tavira / SC Farense
- Efapel Cycling
- Illes Balears Arabay Cycling
- Sabgal–Anicolor
- Tavfer–Ovos Matinados–Mortágua

== Route ==
Stage characteristics and winners
Stage	Date	Course	Distance	Type	Stage winner
1	22 February	A Coruña	14.8 km (9.2 mi)	Individual time trial	Joshua Tarling (GBR)
2	23 February	Taboada to Chantada	151.2 km (94.0 mi)	Hilly stage	Jonas Vingegaard (DEN)
3	24 February	Xinzo de Limia to Castelo de Ribadavia	173.2 km (107.6 mi)	Hilly stage	Jonas Vingegaard (DEN)
4	25 February	Ponteareas to ~~Tui~~ Monte Aloia	~~158.1 km (98.2 mi)~~ 132 km (82 mi)	Mountain stage	Jonas Vingegaard (DEN)
Total			471.2 km (292.8 mi)		

== Stages ==
=== Stage 1 ===
22 February 2024 — A Coruña, 14.8 km (9.2 mi) (ITT)

Due to adverse weather, the stage was not included into the general classification standings.

Stage 1 Result (1–10)
Rank	Rider	Team	Time
1	Joshua Tarling (GBR)	Ineos Grenadiers	18' 21"
2	Darren Rafferty (IRL)	EF Education–EasyPost	+ 42"
3	Pablo Castrillo (ESP)	Equipo Kern Pharma	+ 48"
4	Will Barta (ESP)	Movistar Team	+ 55"
5	Xabier Azparren (ESP)	Q36.5 Pro Cycling Team	+ 58"
6	Wilco Kelderman (NED)	Visma–Lease a Bike	+ 1' 02"
7	Raúl García Pierna (ESP)	Arkéa–B&B Hotels	+ 1' 05"
8	Andrea Piccolo (ITA)	EF Education–EasyPost	+ 1' 09"
9	Carlos Canal (ESP)	Movistar Team	+ 1' 09"
10	Michał Kwiatkowski (POL)	Ineos Grenadiers	+ 1' 14"

=== Stage 2 ===
23 February 2024 — Taboada to Chantada, 151.2 km (94.0 mi)

Stage 2 Result
Rank	Rider	Team	Time
1	Jonas Vingegaard (DEN)	Visma–Lease a Bike	3h 50' 03"
2	Egan Bernal (COL)	Ineos Grenadiers	+ 24"
3	Jefferson Alveiro Cepeda (ECU)	Caja Rural–Seguros RGA	+ 24"
4	Cian Uijtdebroeks (BEL)	Visma–Lease a Bike	+ 40"
5	Lenny Martinez (FRA)	Groupama–FDJ	+ 40"
6	Alex Molenaar (NED)	Illes Balears Arabay Cycling	+ 46"
7	Quentin Pacher (FRA)	Groupama–FDJ	+ 46"
8	Matteo Fabbro (ITA)	Polti–Kometa	+ 46"
9	Raúl García Pierna (ESP)	Arkéa–B&B Hotels	+ 46"
10	Richard Carapaz (ECU)	EF Education–EasyPost	+ 46"

General classification after Stage 2
Rank	Rider	Team	Time
1	Jonas Vingegaard (DEN)	Visma–Lease a Bike	3h 49' 53"
2	Egan Bernal (COL)	Ineos Grenadiers	+ 28"
3	Jefferson Alveiro Cepeda (ECU)	Caja Rural–Seguros RGA	+ 30"
4	Cian Uijtdebroeks (BEL)	Visma–Lease a Bike	+ 50"
5	Lenny Martinez (FRA)	Groupama–FDJ	+ 50"
6	Ruben Guerreiro (POR)	Movistar Team	+ 53"
7	Alex Molenaar (NED)	Illes Balears Arabay Cycling	+ 54"
8	Raúl García Pierna (ESP)	Arkéa–B&B Hotels	+ 55"
9	Quentin Pacher (FRA)	Groupama–FDJ	+ 56"
10	Matteo Fabbro (ITA)	Polti–Kometa	+ 56"

=== Stage 3 ===
24 February 2024 — Xinzo de Limia to Castelo de Ribadavia, 173.2 km (107.6 mi)

Stage 3 Result
Rank	Rider	Team	Time
1	Jonas Vingegaard (DEN)	Visma–Lease a Bike	4h 03' 14"
2	Carlos Canal (ESP)	Movistar Team	+ 29"
3	Quentin Pacher (FRA)	Groupama–FDJ	+ 29"
4	Gotzon Martín (ESP)	Euskaltel–Euskadi	+ 29"
5	Guillermo Thomas Silva (URU)	Caja Rural–Seguros RGA	+ 29"
6	Joan Bou (ESP)	Euskaltel–Euskadi	+ 29"
7	David Gaudu (FRA)	Groupama–FDJ	+ 29"
8	Gianluca Brambilla (ITA)	Q36.5 Pro Cycling Team	+ 29"
9	Raúl García Pierna (ESP)	Arkéa–B&B Hotels	+ 29"
10	Ruben Guerreiro (POR)	Movistar Team	+ 29"

General classification after Stage 3
Rank	Rider	Team	Time
1	Jonas Vingegaard (DEN)	Visma–Lease a Bike	7h 52' 51"
2	Egan Bernal (COL)	Ineos Grenadiers	+ 1' 13"
3	Jefferson Alveiro Cepeda (ECU)	Caja Rural–Seguros RGA	+ 1' 15"
4	Cian Uijtdebroeks (BEL)	Visma–Lease a Bike	+ 1' 35"
5	Lenny Martinez (FRA)	Groupama–FDJ	+ 1' 35"
6	Quentin Pacher (FRA)	Groupama–FDJ	+ 1' 37"
7	Ruben Guerreiro (POR)	Movistar Team	+ 1' 38"
8	Raúl García Pierna (ESP)	Arkéa–B&B Hotels	+ 1' 40"
9	Richard Carapaz (ECU)	EF Education–EasyPost	+ 1' 40"
10	David Gaudu (FRA)	Groupama–FDJ	+ 1' 41"

=== Stage 4 ===
25 February 2024 — Ponteareas to ~~Tui~~ Monte Aloia, ~~158.1 km (98.2 mi)~~ 132 km (82 mi)

Due to adverse weather conditions, the stage was shortened to 132 km and ended at the top of the second to last climb.

Stage 4 Result
Rank	Rider	Team	Time
1	Jonas Vingegaard (DEN)	Visma–Lease a Bike	3h 27' 20"
2	Lenny Martinez (FRA)	Groupama–FDJ	+ 16"
3	Hugh Carthy (GBR)	EF Education–EasyPost	+ 45"
4	Egan Bernal (COL)	Ineos Grenadiers	+ 48"
5	Jefferson Alveiro Cepeda (ECU)	Caja Rural–Seguros RGA	+ 49"
6	Cian Uijtdebroeks (BEL)	Visma–Lease a Bike	+ 57"
7	Javier Romo (ESP)	Movistar Team	+ 1' 04"
8	Matteo Fabbro (ITA)	Polti–Kometa	+ 1' 10"
9	Quentin Pacher (FRA)	Groupama–FDJ	+ 1' 11"
10	Raúl García Pierna (ESP)	Arkéa–B&B Hotels	+ 1' 11"

General classification after Stage 4
Rank	Rider	Team	Time
1	Jonas Vingegaard (DEN)	Visma–Lease a Bike	11h 20' 01"
2	Lenny Martinez (FRA)	Groupama–FDJ	+ 1' 55"
3	Egan Bernal (COL)	Ineos Grenadiers	+ 2' 11"
4	Jefferson Alveiro Cepeda (ECU)	Caja Rural–Seguros RGA	+ 2' 14"
5	Cian Uijtdebroeks (BEL)	Visma–Lease a Bike	+ 2' 42"
6	Hugh Carthy (GBR)	EF Education–EasyPost	+ 2' 48"
7	Quentin Pacher (FRA)	Groupama–FDJ	+ 2' 58"
8	Ruben Guerreiro (POR)	Movistar Team	+ 2' 59"
9	Raúl García Pierna (ESP)	Arkéa–B&B Hotels	+ 3' 01"
10	Matteo Fabbro (ITA)	Polti–Kometa	+ 3' 01"

== Classification leadership table ==
Classification leadership by stage
Stage	Winner	General classification	Points classification	Mountains classification	Young rider classification	Team classification	Combativity award
1	Joshua Tarling	Not awarded	Not awarded	Not awarded	Not awarded	Not awarded	Not awarded
2	Jonas Vingegaard	Jonas Vingegaard	Jonas Vingegaard	José Manuel Díaz	Cian Uijtdebroeks	Groupama–FDJ	Xabier Azparren
3	Jonas Vingegaard	Jonas Vingegaard	Jonas Vingegaard	Jonas Vingegaard	Cian Uijtdebroeks	Visma–Lease a Bike	Pablo Castrillo
4	Jonas Vingegaard	Jonas Vingegaard	Jonas Vingegaard	Jonas Vingegaard	Lenny Martinez	Visma–Lease a Bike	Eric Fagúndez
Final		Jonas Vingegaard	Jonas Vingegaard	Jonas Vingegaard	Lenny Martinez	Visma–Lease a Bike	Not awarded

== Classification standings ==
Legend
Denotes the winner of the general classification	Denotes the winner of the mountains classification
Denotes the winner of the points classification	Denotes the winner of the young rider classification

=== General classification ===
Final general classification (1–10)
Rank	Rider	Team	Time
1	Jonas Vingegaard (DEN)	Visma–Lease a Bike	11h 20' 01"
2	Lenny Martinez (FRA)	Groupama–FDJ	+ 1' 55"
3	Egan Bernal (COL)	Ineos Grenadiers	+ 2' 11"
4	Jefferson Alveiro Cepeda (ECU)	Caja Rural–Seguros RGA	+ 2' 14"
5	Cian Uijtdebroeks (BEL)	Visma–Lease a Bike	+ 2' 42"
6	Hugh Carthy (GBR)	EF Education–EasyPost	+ 2' 48"
7	Quentin Pacher (FRA)	Groupama–FDJ	+ 2' 58"
8	Ruben Guerreiro (POR)	Movistar Team	+ 2' 59"
9	Raúl García Pierna (ESP)	Arkéa–B&B Hotels	+ 3' 01"
10	Matteo Fabbro (ITA)	Polti–Kometa	+ 3' 01"

=== Points classification ===
Final points classification (1–10)
Rank	Rider	Team	Time
1	Jonas Vingegaard (DEN)	Visma–Lease a Bike	100
2	Egan Bernal (COL)	Ineos Grenadiers	49
3	Quentin Pacher (FRA)	Groupama–FDJ	44
4	Jefferson Alveiro Cepeda (ECU)	Caja Rural–Seguros RGA	43
5	Lenny Martinez (FRA)	Groupama–FDJ	42
6	Cian Uijtdebroeks (BEL)	Visma–Lease a Bike	37
7	Carlos Canal (ESP)	Movistar Team	31
8	Hugh Carthy (GBR)	EF Education–EasyPost	26
9	Raúl García Pierna (ESP)	Arkéa–B&B Hotels	26
10	Ruben Guerreiro (POR)	Movistar Team	24

=== Mountains classification ===
Final mountains classification (1–10)
Rank	Rider	Team	Time
1	Jonas Vingegaard (DEN)	Visma–Lease a Bike	19
2	David de la Cruz (ESP)	Q36.5 Pro Cycling Team	9
3	José Manuel Díaz (ESP)	Burgos BH	6
4	Lenny Martinez (FRA)	Groupama–FDJ	6
5	Walter Calzoni (ITA)	Q36.5 Pro Cycling Team	5
6	Xabier Azparren (ESP)	Q36.5 Pro Cycling Team	5
7	Egan Bernal (COL)	Ineos Grenadiers	5
8	Hugh Carthy (GBR)	EF Education–EasyPost	4
9	Frederico Figueiredo (POR)	Sabgal–Anicolor	4
10	Wilco Kelderman (NED)	Visma–Lease a Bike	3

=== Young rider classification ===
Final young rider classification (1–10)
Rank	Rider	Team	Time
1	Lenny Martinez (FRA)	Groupama–FDJ	11h 21' 56"
2	Cian Uijtdebroeks (BEL)	Visma–Lease a Bike	+ 47"
3	Raúl García Pierna (ESP)	Arkéa–B&B Hotels	+ 1' 06"
4	Carlos Canal (ESP)	Movistar Team	+ 2' 20"
5	Guillermo Thomas Silva (URU)	Caja Rural–Seguros RGA	+ 2' 28"
6	Darren Rafferty (IRL)	EF Education–EasyPost	+ 3' 19"
7	Reuben Thompson (NZL)	Groupama–FDJ	+ 5' 56"
8	Enzo Paleni (FRA)	Groupama–FDJ	+ 8' 49"
9	Ben Tulett (GBR)	Visma–Lease a Bike	+ 10' 29"
10	Carlos Rodríguez (ESP)	Ineos Grenadiers	+ 10' 40"

=== Teams classification ===
Final team classification (1–10)
Rank	Team	Time
1	(Netherlands) Visma–Lease a Bike	34h 07' 38"
2	(France) Groupama–FDJ	+ 1' 55"
3	(United States) EF Education–EasyPost	+ 3' 34"
4	(Spain) Movistar Team	+ 5' 44"
5	(Spain) Euskaltel–Euskadi	+ 7' 12"
6	(Spain) Caja Rural–Seguros RGA	+ 12' 12"
7	(United Kingdom) Ineos Grenadiers	+ 13' 31"
8	(Switzerland) Q36.5 Pro Cycling Team	+ 22' 03"
9	(Spain) Equipo Kern Pharma	+ 29' 46"
10	(Spain) Burgos BH	+ 30' 39"
