= Lenny Martinez =

Lenny Martinez may refer to:

- Lenny Martinez (musician)
- Lenny Martinez (cyclist)
