= Mont Ventoux Dénivelé Challenge =

Cycle road race

Race details
- Date: Mid-June
- Region: Provence, France
- English name: Mont Ventoux Descent Challenge
- Local name(s): Mont Ventoux Dénivelé Challenge
- Discipline: Road
- Competition: UCI ProSeries
- Type: Single-day
- Web site: www.denivelechallenges.com

History
- First edition: 2019
- Editions: 5 (as of 2023)
- First winner: Jesús Herrada (ESP)
- Most wins: No repeat winners
- Most recent: Lenny Martinez (FRA)

The Mont Ventoux Dénivelé Challenge is a professional cycle road race first held in 2019, which takes place between Vaison-la-Romaine and Mont Ventoux. The event was classified by the UCI as category 1.1 event on the UCI Europe Tour from 2019 to 2022.

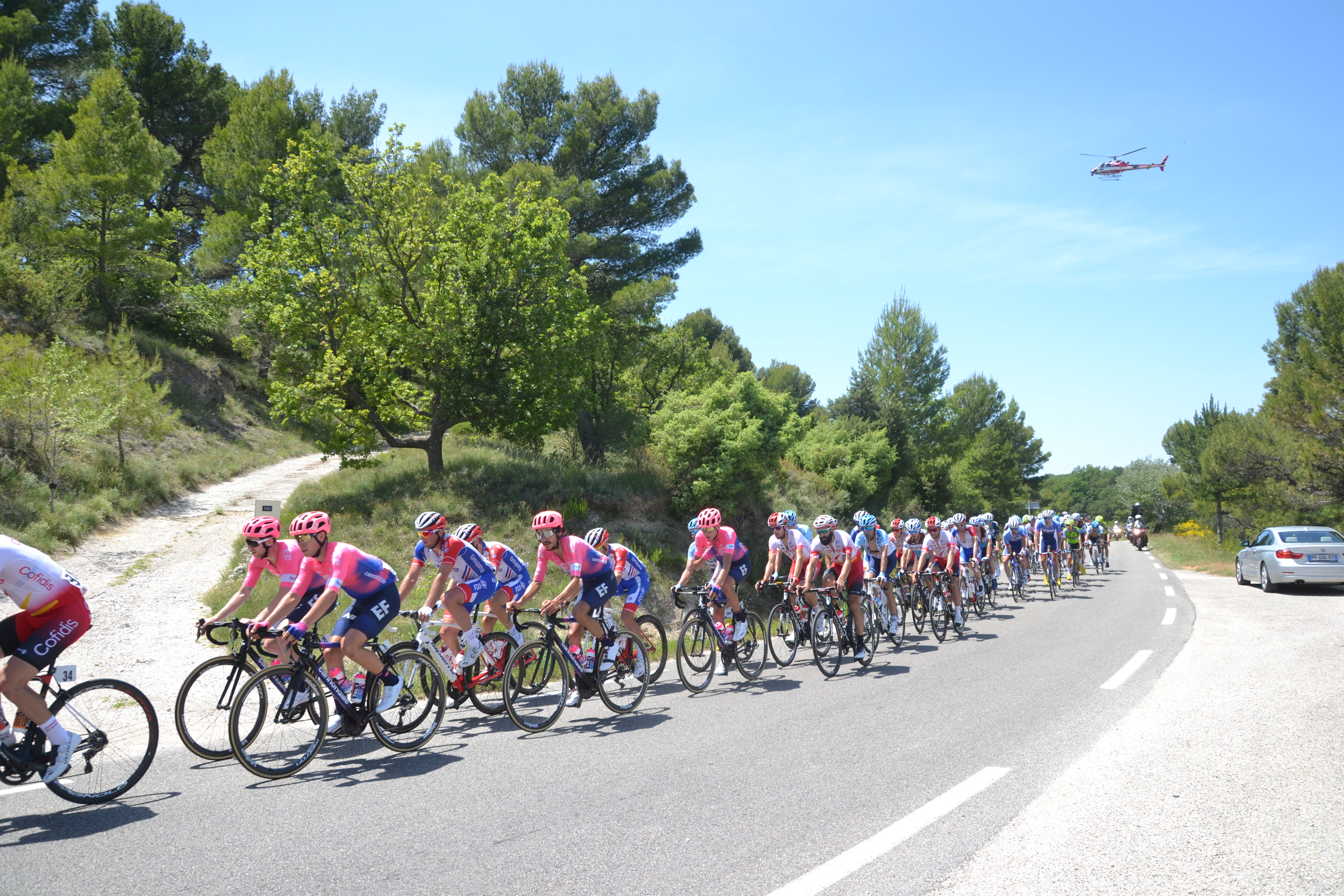
Mont Ventoux Dénivelé Challenges 2019: peloton on the climb to Blauvac

In 2023, the race joined the UCI ProSeries. The event was not held in 2024, as the proposed date clashed with the 2024 Summer Olympics torch relay held in the location, while the 2025 event was cancelled due to financial reasons.

== Winners – Men ==
Year	Country	Rider	Team
2019	Spain	Jesús Herrada	Cofidis
2020	Russia	Aleksandr Vlasov	Astana
2021	Colombia	Miguel Ángel López	Movistar Team
2022	Portugal	Ruben Guerreiro	EF Education–EasyPost
2023	France	Lenny Martinez	Groupama–FDJ

=== Wins per country ===
Wins	Country
1	Colombia; France; Portugal; Russia; Spain

== Winners – Women ==
Year	Country	Rider	Team
2022	Italy	Marta Cavalli	FDJ Nouvelle-Aquitaine Futuroscope

=== Wins per country ===
Wins	Country
1	Italy
