= 2021 Tirreno–Adriatico =

Cycling race

2021 UCI World Tour, race 5 of 29

Race details
- Dates: 10–16 March 2021
- Stages: 7
- Distance: 1,103.1 km (685.4 mi)

Results
Jersey awarded to the overall winner	Winner	Tadej Pogačar (SLO)	(UAE Team Emirates)
	Second	Wout van Aert (BEL)	(Team Jumbo–Visma)
	Third	Mikel Landa (ESP)	(Team Bahrain Victorious)
Jersey awarded to the points classification winner	Points	Wout van Aert (BEL)	(Team Jumbo–Visma)
Jersey awarded to the mountains classification winner	Mountains	Tadej Pogačar (SLO)	(UAE Team Emirates)
Jersey awarded to the youth classification winner	Youth	Tadej Pogačar (SLO)	(UAE Team Emirates)
	Team	Astana–Premier Tech	

The 2021 Tirreno–Adriatico was a road cycling stage race that took place between 10 and 16 March 2021 in Italy. It was the 56th edition of Tirreno–Adriatico and part of the 2021 UCI World Tour.

== Teams ==
Twenty-five teams participated in the race, including all nineteen UCI WorldTeams and six UCI ProTeams. Each team entered seven riders, for a total of 175 riders, of which 159 finished.

UCI WorldTeams

- AG2R Citroën Team
- Astana–Premier Tech
- Bora–Hansgrohe
- Cofidis
- Deceuninck–Quick-Step
- EF Education–Nippo
- Groupama–FDJ
- Ineos Grenadiers
- Intermarché–Wanty–Gobert Matériaux
- Israel Start-Up Nation
- Lotto–Soudal
- Movistar Team
- Team Bahrain Victorious
- Team BikeExchange
- Team DSM
- Team Jumbo–Visma
- Team Qhubeka Assos
- Trek–Segafredo
- UAE Team Emirates

UCI ProTeams

- Alpecin–Fenix
- Androni Giocattoli–Sidermec
- Arkéa–Samsic
- Eolo–Kometa
- Gazprom–RusVelo
- Total Direct Énergie

== Route ==
Stage characteristics and winners
Stage	Date	Route	Distance	Type	Winner
1	10 March	Lido di Camaiore to Lido di Camaiore	156 km (97 mi)	Flat stage	Wout van Aert (BEL)
2	11 March	Camaiore to Chiusdino	226 km (140 mi)	Hilly stage	Julian Alaphilippe (FRA)
3	12 March	Monticiano to Gualdo Tadino	189 km (117 mi)	Hilly stage	Mathieu van der Poel (NED)
4	13 March	Terni to Prati di Tivo	148 km (92 mi)	Mountain stage	Tadej Pogačar (SLO)
5	14 March	Castellalto to Castelfidardo	205 km (127 mi)	Hilly stage	Mathieu van der Poel (NED)
6	15 March	Castelraimondo to Lido di Fermo	169 km (105 mi)	Flat stage	Mads Würtz Schmidt (DEN)
7	16 March	San Benedetto del Tronto to San Benedetto del Tronto	10.1 km (6.3 mi)	Individual time trial	Wout van Aert (BEL)
Total		1,103.1 km (685.4 mi)			

== Stages ==
=== Stage 1 ===
10 March 2021 — Lido di Camaiore to Lido di Camaiore, 156 km (97 mi)

Stage 1 Result
Rank	Rider	Team	Time
1	Wout van Aert (BEL)	Team Jumbo–Visma	3h 36' 17"
2	Caleb Ewan (AUS)	Lotto–Soudal	+ 0"
3	Fernando Gaviria (COL)	UAE Team Emirates	+ 0"
4	Andrea Vendrame (ITA)	AG2R Citroën Team	+ 0"
5	Luka Mezgec (SLO)	Team BikeExchange	+ 0"
6	Tim Merlier (BEL)	Alpecin–Fenix	+ 0"
7	Álvaro Hodeg (COL)	Deceuninck–Quick-Step	+ 0"
8	Davide Ballerini (ITA)	Deceuninck–Quick-Step	+ 0"
9	Iván García Cortina (ESP)	Movistar Team	+ 0"
10	Hugo Hofstetter (FRA)	Israel Start-Up Nation	+ 0"

General classification after Stage 1
Rank	Rider	Team	Time
1	Wout van Aert (BEL)	Team Jumbo–Visma	3h 36' 07"
2	Caleb Ewan (AUS)	Lotto–Soudal	+ 4"
3	Fernando Gaviria (COL)	UAE Team Emirates	+ 6"
4	Simone Velasco (ITA)	Gazprom–RusVelo	+ 7"
5	Mattia Bais (ITA)	Androni Giocattoli–Sidermec	+ 8"
6	Andrea Vendrame (ITA)	AG2R Citroën Team	+ 10"
7	Luka Mezgec (SLO)	Team BikeExchange	+ 10"
8	Tim Merlier (BEL)	Alpecin–Fenix	+ 10"
9	Álvaro Hodeg (COL)	Deceuninck–Quick-Step	+ 10"
10	Davide Ballerini (ITA)	Deceuninck–Quick-Step	+ 10"

=== Stage 2 ===
11 March 2021 — Camaiore to Chiusdino, 226 km (140 mi)

Stage 2 Result
Rank	Rider	Team	Time
1	Julian Alaphilippe (FRA)	Deceuninck–Quick-Step	5h 01' 32"
2	Mathieu van der Poel (NED)	Alpecin–Fenix	+ 0"
3	Wout van Aert (BEL)	Team Jumbo–Visma	+ 0"
4	Tadej Pogačar (SLO)	UAE Team Emirates	+ 0"
5	Alex Aranburu (ESP)	Astana–Premier Tech	+ 0"
6	Robert Stannard (AUS)	Team BikeExchange	+ 0"
7	João Almeida (POR)	Deceuninck–Quick-Step	+ 0"
8	Greg Van Avermaet (BEL)	AG2R Citroën Team	+ 0"
9	Tim Wellens (BEL)	Lotto–Soudal	+ 0"
10	Giulio Ciccone (ITA)	Trek–Segafredo	+ 0"

General classification after Stage 2
Rank	Rider	Team	Time
1	Wout van Aert (BEL)	Team Jumbo–Visma	8h 37' 35"
2	Julian Alaphilippe (FRA)	Deceuninck–Quick-Step	+ 4"
3	Mathieu van der Poel (NED)	Alpecin–Fenix	+ 8"
4	Pavel Sivakov (RUS)	Ineos Grenadiers	+ 11"
5	Mikel Landa (ESP)	Team Bahrain Victorious	+ 13"
6	Andrea Vendrame (ITA)	AG2R Citroën Team	+ 14"
7	Robert Stannard (AUS)	Team BikeExchange	+ 14"
8	João Almeida (POR)	Deceuninck–Quick-Step	+ 14"
9	Tadej Pogačar (SLO)	UAE Team Emirates	+ 14"
10	Alex Aranburu (ESP)	Astana–Premier Tech	+ 14"

=== Stage 3 ===
12 March 2021 — Monticiano to Gualdo Tadino, 189 km (117 mi)

Stage 3 Result
Rank	Rider	Team	Time
1	Mathieu van der Poel (NED)	Alpecin–Fenix	5h 24' 18"
2	Wout van Aert (BEL)	Team Jumbo–Visma	+ 0"
3	Davide Ballerini (ITA)	Deceuninck–Quick-Step	+ 0"
4	Sergio Higuita (COL)	EF Education–Nippo	+ 0"
5	Greg Van Avermaet (BEL)	AG2R Citroën Team	+ 0"
6	Jasper De Buyst (BEL)	Lotto–Soudal	+ 0"
7	Iván García Cortina (ESP)	Movistar Team	+ 0"
8	Tadej Pogačar (SLO)	UAE Team Emirates	+ 0"
9	Gonzalo Serrano (ESP)	Movistar Team	+ 0"
10	Hugo Hofstetter (FRA)	Israel Start-Up Nation	+ 0"

General classification after Stage 3
Rank	Rider	Team	Time
1	Wout van Aert (BEL)	Team Jumbo–Visma	14h 01' 47"
2	Mathieu van der Poel (NED)	Alpecin–Fenix	+ 4"
3	Julian Alaphilippe (FRA)	Deceuninck–Quick-Step	+ 10"
4	Mikel Landa (ESP)	Team Bahrain Victorious	+ 19"
5	Tadej Pogačar (SLO)	UAE Team Emirates	+ 20"
6	Robert Stannard (AUS)	Team BikeExchange	+ 20"
7	João Almeida (POR)	Deceuninck–Quick-Step	+ 20"
8	Sergio Higuita (COL)	EF Education–Nippo	+ 20"
9	Jasper De Buyst (BEL)	Lotto–Soudal	+ 20"
10	Patrick Konrad (AUT)	Bora–Hansgrohe	+ 20"

=== Stage 4 ===
13 March 2021 — Terni to Prati di Tivo, 148 km (92 mi)

Stage 4 Result
Rank	Rider	Team	Time
1	Tadej Pogačar (SLO)	UAE Team Emirates	3h 51' 24"
2	Simon Yates (GBR)	Team BikeExchange	+ 6"
3	Sergio Higuita (COL)	EF Education–Nippo	+ 29"
4	Mikel Landa (ESP)	Team Bahrain Victorious	+ 29"
5	Nairo Quintana (COL)	Arkéa–Samsic	+ 31"
6	João Almeida (POR)	Deceuninck–Quick-Step	+ 35"
7	Matteo Fabbro (ITA)	Bora–Hansgrohe	+ 42"
8	Simon Carr (GBR)	EF Education–Nippo	+ 42"
9	Wout van Aert (BEL)	Team Jumbo–Visma	+ 45"
10	Jakob Fuglsang (DEN)	Astana–Premier Tech	+ 45"

General classification after Stage 4
Rank	Rider	Team	Time
1	Tadej Pogačar (SLO)	UAE Team Emirates	17h 53' 21"
2	Wout van Aert (BEL)	Team Jumbo–Visma	+ 35"
3	Sergio Higuita (COL)	EF Education–Nippo	+ 35"
4	Mikel Landa (ESP)	Team Bahrain Victorious	+ 38"
5	Nairo Quintana (COL)	Arkéa–Samsic	+ 41"
6	João Almeida (POR)	Deceuninck–Quick-Step	+ 45"
7	Jakob Fuglsang (DEN)	Astana–Premier Tech	+ 55"
8	Simon Carr (GBR)	EF Education–Nippo	+ 1' 03"
9	Matteo Fabbro (ITA)	Bora–Hansgrohe	+ 1' 12"
10	Geraint Thomas (GBR)	Ineos Grenadiers	+ 1' 25"

=== Stage 5 ===
14 March 2021 — Castellalto to Castelfidardo, 205 km (127 mi)

Stage 5 Result
Rank	Rider	Team	Time
1	Mathieu van der Poel (NED)	Alpecin–Fenix	4h 48' 17"
2	Tadej Pogačar (SLO)	UAE Team Emirates	+ 10"
3	Wout van Aert (BEL)	Team Jumbo–Visma	+ 49"
4	Fabio Felline (ITA)	Astana–Premier Tech	+ 1' 26"
5	Egan Bernal (COL)	Ineos Grenadiers	+ 2' 07"
6	Davide Formolo (ITA)	UAE Team Emirates	+ 2' 07"
7	Tim Wellens (BEL)	Lotto–Soudal	+ 2' 18"
8	Alessandro De Marchi (ITA)	Israel Start-Up Nation	+ 2' 18"
9	Mikel Landa (ESP)	Team Bahrain Victorious	+ 2' 25"
10	Matteo Fabbro (ITA)	Bora–Hansgrohe	+ 2' 45"

General classification after Stage 5
Rank	Rider	Team	Time
1	Tadej Pogačar (SLO)	UAE Team Emirates	22h 41' 41"
2	Wout van Aert (BEL)	Team Jumbo–Visma	+ 1' 15"
3	Mikel Landa (ESP)	Team Bahrain Victorious	+ 3' 00"
4	Egan Bernal (COL)	Ineos Grenadiers	+ 3' 30"
5	Matteo Fabbro (ITA)	Bora–Hansgrohe	+ 3' 54"
6	Tim Wellens (BEL)	Lotto–Soudal	+ 4' 30"
7	João Almeida (POR)	Deceuninck–Quick-Step	+ 4' 42"
8	Romain Bardet (FRA)	Team DSM	+ 5' 03"
9	Vincenzo Nibali (ITA)	Trek–Segafredo	+ 5' 54"
10	Simon Yates (GBR)	Team BikeExchange	+ 6' 58"

=== Stage 6 ===
15 March 2021 — Castelraimondo to Lido di Fermo, 169 km (105 mi)

Stage 6 Result
Rank	Rider	Team	Time
1	Mads Würtz Schmidt (DEN)	Israel Start-Up Nation	3h 42' 09"
2	Brent Van Moer (BEL)	Lotto–Soudal	+ 0"
3	Simone Velasco (ITA)	Gazprom–RusVelo	+ 0"
4	Jan Bakelants (BEL)	Intermarché–Wanty–Gobert Matériaux	+ 0"
5	Nelson Oliveira (POR)	Movistar Team	+ 0"
6	Emīls Liepiņš (LAT)	Trek–Segafredo	+ 25"
7	Tim Merlier (BEL)	Alpecin–Fenix	+ 1' 09"
8	Davide Ballerini (ITA)	Deceuninck–Quick-Step	+ 1' 09"
9	Elia Viviani (ITA)	Cofidis	+ 1' 09"
10	Max Kanter (GER)	Team DSM	+ 1' 09"

General classification after Stage 6
Rank	Rider	Team	Time
1	Tadej Pogačar (SLO)	UAE Team Emirates	26h 24' 59"
2	Wout van Aert (BEL)	Team Jumbo–Visma	+ 1' 15"
3	Mikel Landa (ESP)	Team Bahrain Victorious	+ 3' 00"
4	Egan Bernal (COL)	Ineos Grenadiers	+ 3' 30"
5	Matteo Fabbro (ITA)	Bora–Hansgrohe	+ 3' 54"
6	Tim Wellens (BEL)	Lotto–Soudal	+ 4' 30"
7	João Almeida (POR)	Deceuninck–Quick-Step	+ 4' 42"
8	Romain Bardet (FRA)	Team DSM	+ 5' 03"
9	Vincenzo Nibali (ITA)	Trek–Segafredo	+ 5' 54"
10	Simon Yates (GBR)	Team BikeExchange	+ 6' 58"

=== Stage 7 ===
16 March 2021 — San Benedetto del Tronto to San Benedetto del Tronto, 10.1 km (6.3 mi), individual time trial (ITT)

Stage 7 Result
Rank	Rider	Team	Time
1	Wout van Aert (BEL)	Team Jumbo–Visma	11' 06"
2	Stefan Küng (SUI)	Groupama–FDJ	+ 6"
3	Filippo Ganna (ITA)	Ineos Grenadiers	+ 11"
4	Tadej Pogačar (SLO)	UAE Team Emirates	+ 12"
5	Benjamin Thomas (FRA)	Groupama–FDJ	+ 16"
6	Alberto Bettiol (ITA)	EF Education–Nippo	+ 18"
7	João Almeida (POR)	Deceuninck–Quick-Step	+ 24"
8	Kasper Asgreen (DEN)	Deceuninck–Quick-Step	+ 26"
9	Michael Hepburn (AUS)	Team BikeExchange	+ 27"
10	Tobias Ludvigsson (SWE)	Groupama–FDJ	+ 28"

General classification after Stage 7
Rank	Rider	Team	Time
1	Tadej Pogačar (SLO)	UAE Team Emirates	26h 36' 17"
2	Wout van Aert (BEL)	Team Jumbo–Visma	+ 1' 03"
3	Mikel Landa (ESP)	Team Bahrain Victorious	+ 3' 57"
4	Egan Bernal (COL)	Ineos Grenadiers	+ 4' 13"
5	Matteo Fabbro (ITA)	Bora–Hansgrohe	+ 4' 37"
6	João Almeida (POR)	Deceuninck–Quick-Step	+ 4' 54"
7	Tim Wellens (BEL)	Lotto–Soudal	+ 5' 00"
8	Romain Bardet (FRA)	Team DSM	+ 5' 50"
9	Vincenzo Nibali (ITA)	Trek–Segafredo	+ 6' 30"
10	Simon Yates (GBR)	Team BikeExchange	+ 7' 45"

== Classification leadership table ==
Classification leadership by stage
Stage	Winner	General classification	Points classification	Mountains classification	Young rider classification	Team classification
1	Wout van Aert	Wout van Aert	Wout van Aert	Vincenzo Albanese	Mattia Bais	Deceuninck–Quick-Step
2	Julian Alaphilippe	Wout van Aert	Wout van Aert	Vincenzo Albanese	Pavel Sivakov	Deceuninck–Quick-Step
3	Mathieu van der Poel	Wout van Aert	Wout van Aert	Vincenzo Albanese	Tadej Pogačar	Deceuninck–Quick-Step
4	Tadej Pogačar	Tadej Pogačar	Wout van Aert	Tadej Pogačar	Tadej Pogačar	Ineos Grenadiers
5	Mathieu van der Poel	Tadej Pogačar	Wout van Aert	Tadej Pogačar	Tadej Pogačar	Astana–Premier Tech
6	Mads Würtz Schmidt	Tadej Pogačar	Wout van Aert	Tadej Pogačar	Tadej Pogačar	Astana–Premier Tech
7	Wout van Aert	Tadej Pogačar	Wout van Aert	Tadej Pogačar	Tadej Pogačar	Astana–Premier Tech
Final		Tadej Pogačar	Wout van Aert	Tadej Pogačar	Tadej Pogačar	Astana–Premier Tech

- On stages 2 and 3, Caleb Ewan, who was second in the points classification, wore the violet jersey, because first-placed Wout van Aert wore the blue jersey as the leader of the general classification.
- On stage 4, Davide Ballerini, who was fourth in the points classification, wore the violet jersey, because first-placed Wout van Aert wore the blue jersey as the leader of the general classification, second-placed Mathieu van der Poel wore the jersey of the Dutch national road race champion, and third-placed Julian Alaphilippe wore the jersey of the UCI world road race champion.
- On stages 5 and 7, Mads Würtz Schmidt, who was second in the mountains classification, wore the green jersey, because first-placed Tadej Pogačar wore the blue jersey as the leader of the general classification. On stage 6, Würtz Schmidt, who dropped to third in the mountains classification, still wore the green jersey, because first-placed Tadej Pogačar wore the blue jersey and second-placed Mathieu van der Poel wore the jersey of the Dutch national road race champion.
- On stage 5, João Almeida, who was third in the young rider classification, wore the white jersey, because first-placed Tadej Pogačar wore the blue jersey as the leader of the general classification and second-placed Sergio Higuita wore the jersey of the Colombian national road race champion.
- On stages 6 and 7, Egan Bernal, who was second in the young rider classification, wore the white jersey, because first-placed Tadej Pogačar wore the blue jersey as the leader of the general classification.

== Final classification standings ==
Legend
Denotes the winner of the general classification	Denotes the winner of the mountains classification
Denotes the winner of the points classification	Denotes the winner of the young rider classification

=== General classification ===
Final general classification (1–10)
Rank	Rider	Team	Time
1	Tadej Pogačar (SLO)	UAE Team Emirates	26h 36' 17"
2	Wout van Aert (BEL)	Team Jumbo–Visma	+ 1' 03"
3	Mikel Landa (ESP)	Team Bahrain Victorious	+ 3' 57"
4	Egan Bernal (COL)	Ineos Grenadiers	+ 4' 13"
5	Matteo Fabbro (ITA)	Bora–Hansgrohe	+ 4' 37"
6	João Almeida (POR)	Deceuninck–Quick-Step	+ 4' 54"
7	Tim Wellens (BEL)	Lotto–Soudal	+ 5' 00"
8	Romain Bardet (FRA)	Team DSM	+ 5' 50"
9	Vincenzo Nibali (ITA)	Trek–Segafredo	+ 6' 30"
10	Simon Yates (GBR)	Team BikeExchange	+ 7' 45"

=== Points classification ===
Final points classification (1–10)
Rank	Rider	Team	Points
1	Wout van Aert (BEL)	Team Jumbo–Visma	55
2	Tadej Pogačar (SLO)	UAE Team Emirates	42
3	Mathieu van der Poel (NED)	Alpecin–Fenix	39
4	Mads Würtz Schmidt (DEN)	Israel Start-Up Nation	20
5	Sergio Higuita (COL)	EF Education–Nippo	15
6	Simone Velasco (ITA)	Gazprom–RusVelo	14
7	João Almeida (POR)	Deceuninck–Quick-Step	14
8	Davide Ballerini (ITA)	Deceuninck–Quick-Step	14
9	Simon Yates (GBR)	Team BikeExchange	13
10	Julian Alaphilippe (FRA)	Deceuninck–Quick-Step	12

=== Mountains classification ===
Final mountains classification (1–10)
Rank	Rider	Team	Points
1	Tadej Pogačar (SLO)	UAE Team Emirates	24
2	Mads Würtz Schmidt (DEN)	Israel Start-Up Nation	20
3	Mathieu van der Poel (NED)	Alpecin–Fenix	18
4	Jan Bakelants (BEL)	Intermarché–Wanty–Gobert Matériaux	16
5	Simon Yates (GBR)	Team BikeExchange	15
6	Vincenzo Albanese (ITA)	Eolo–Kometa	13
7	Mattia Bais (ITA)	Androni Giocattoli–Sidermec	12
8	Pello Bilbao (ESP)	Team Bahrain Victorious	8
9	Simone Velasco (ITA)	Gazprom–RusVelo	8
10	Filippo Ganna (ITA)	Ineos Grenadiers	7

=== Young rider classification ===
Final young rider classification (1–10)
Rank	Rider	Team	Time
1	Tadej Pogačar (SLO)	UAE Team Emirates	26h 36' 17"
2	Egan Bernal (COL)	Ineos Grenadiers	+ 4' 13"
3	João Almeida (POR)	Deceuninck–Quick-Step	+ 4' 54"
4	Tobias Foss (NOR)	Team Jumbo–Visma	+ 12' 39"
5	Pavel Sivakov (RUS)	Ineos Grenadiers	+ 14' 58"
6	Sergio Higuita (COL)	EF Education–Nippo	+ 22' 12"
7	Simon Carr (GBR)	EF Education–Nippo	+ 26' 17"
8	Giovanni Aleotti (ITA)	Bora–Hansgrohe	+ 30' 18"
9	Natnael Tesfatsion (ERI)	Androni Giocattoli–Sidermec	+ 31' 17"
10	Quinn Simmons (USA)	Trek–Segafredo	+ 36' 17"

=== Team classification ===
Final team classification (1–10)
Rank	Team	Time
1	Astana–Premier Tech	80h 16' 45"
2	Ineos Grenadiers	+ 2' 48"
3	Movistar Team	+ 13' 15"
4	Team Jumbo–Visma	+ 14' 12"
5	Team DSM	+ 17' 34"
6	UAE Team Emirates	+ 17' 52"
7	Trek–Segafredo	+ 18' 35"
8	Bora–Hansgrohe	+ 20' 43"
9	Team Bahrain Victorious	+ 21' 02"
10	Deceuninck–Quick-Step	+ 23' 30"
