= 2022 Mercan'Tour Classic =

French one-day road cycling race

2022 Mercan'Tour Classic Alpes-Maritimes
2022 UCI Europe Tour

Race details
- Dates: 31 May 2022
- Stages: 1
- Distance: 167.9 km (104.3 mi)
- Winning time: 4h 50' 34"

Results
	Winner	Jakob Fuglsang (DEN)	(Israel–Premier Tech)
	Second	Michael Woods (CAN)	(Israel–Premier Tech)
	Third	David Gaudu (FRA)	(Groupama–FDJ)

The 2022 Mercan'Tour Classic Alpes-Maritimes was the second edition of the Mercan'Tour Classic Alpes-Maritimes road cycling one day race, which took place in the titular department in southeastern France on 31 May 2022. It was rated as a category 1.1 race on the 2022 UCI Europe Tour. The race was won by Dane Jakob Fuglsang (Israel–Premier Tech), which was his first win since the 2020 Il Lombardia.

== Teams ==
Seven UCI WorldTeams, four UCI ProTeams, and six UCI Continental teams made up the seventeen teams that participated in the race. Teams could enter up to seven riders each, but many decided not to do so. Four teams (AG2R Citroën Team, Intermarché–Wanty–Gobert Matériaux, Movistar Team, and Global 6 Cycling) fielded only six riders each, St. Michel–Auber93 only fielded five, while the remaining teams fielded the maximum number allowed.

Of the 113 riders to start the race, only 63 riders finished.

UCI WorldTeams

- AG2R Citroën Team
- Cofidis
- Groupama–FDJ
- Israel–Premier Tech
- Intermarché–Wanty–Gobert Matériaux
- Lotto–Soudal
- Movistar Team

UCI ProTeams

- Arkéa–Samsic
- B&B Hotels–KTM
- Team TotalEnergies
- Equipo Kern Pharma

UCI Continental Teams

- St. Michel–Auber93
- China Glory Continental Cycling Team
- Electro Hiper Europa–Caldas
- Global 6 Cycling
- Nice Métropole Côte d'Azur
- Team UC Nantes Atlantique

== Result ==
Result
Rank	Rider	Team	Time
1	Jakob Fuglsang (DEN)	Israel–Premier Tech	4h 50' 34"
2	Michael Woods (CAN)	Israel–Premier Tech	+ 31"
3	David Gaudu (FRA)	Groupama–FDJ	+ 34"
4	Jesús Herrada (ESP)	Cofidis	+ 1' 05"
5	Steff Cras (BEL)	Lotto–Soudal	+ 1' 07"
6	Louis Meintjes (RSA)	Intermarché–Wanty–Gobert Matériaux	+ 1' 46"
7	Matteo Jorgenson (USA)	Movistar Team	+ 2' 03"
8	Lenny Martinez (FRA)	Groupama–FDJ	+ 2' 53"
9	Michel Ries (LUX)	Arkéa–Samsic	+ 3' 15"
10	Sébastien Reichenbach (SUI)	Groupama–FDJ	+ 3' 49"
