= Matteo Fabbro =

Italian cyclist

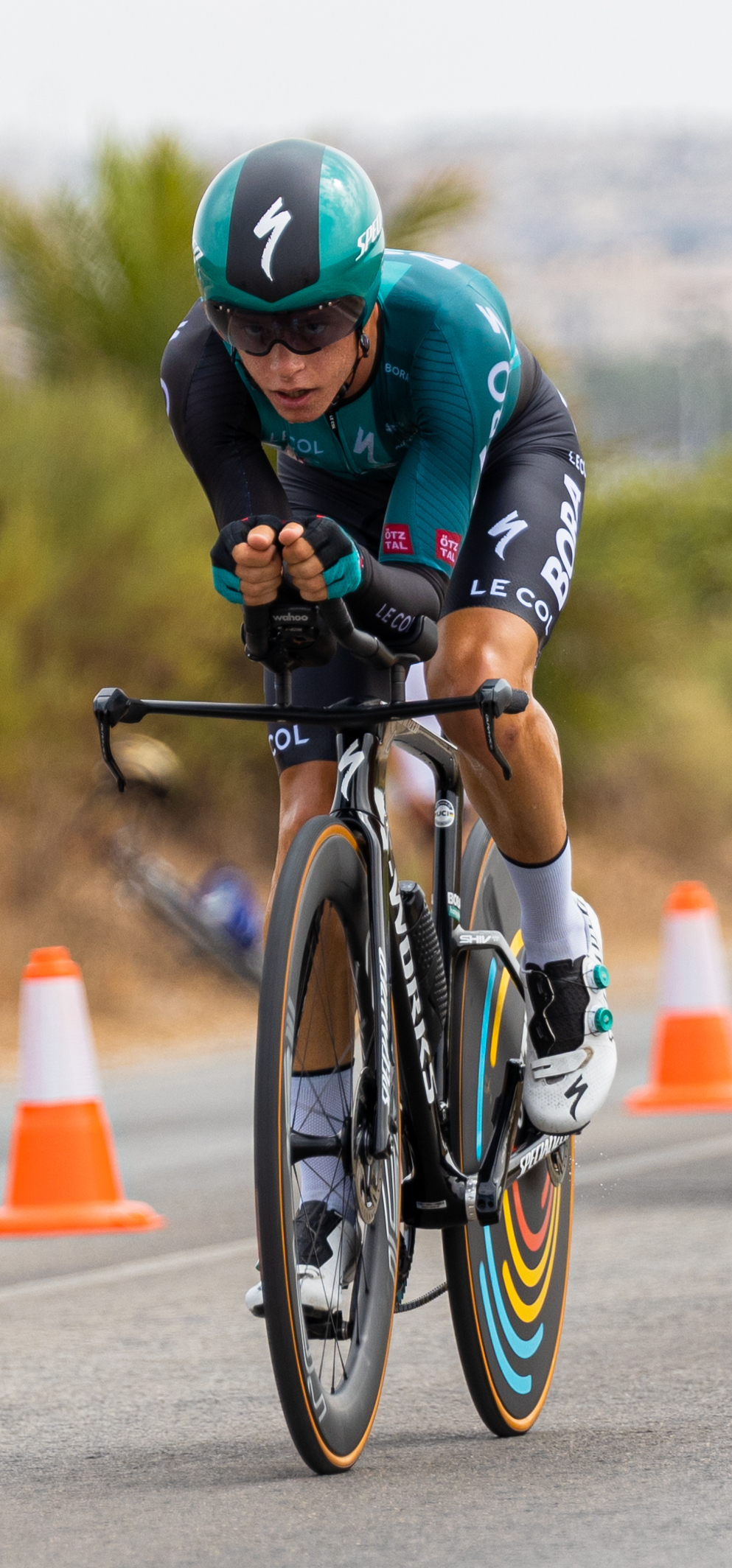
- Fabbro at the 2022 Vuelta a España

Personal information
- Born: 10 April 1995 (age 31) Udine, Italy
- Height: 1.67 m (5 ft 6 in)
- Weight: 52 kg (115 lb)

Cycling career
- Sport: Cycling
- Discipline: Road
- Role: Rider
- Rider type: Climber

Amateur team
- 2014–2017: Cycling Team Friuli

Professional teams
- 2018–2019: Team Katusha–Alpecin
- 2020–2023: Bora–Hansgrohe
- 2024: Polti–Kometa
- 2025–: Team Solution Tech–Vini Fantini

Matteo Fabbro (born 10 April 1995 in Udine) is an Italian cyclist, who rides for UCI ProTeam Solution Tech NIPPO Rali.

In August 2019, he was named in the startlist for the 2019 Vuelta a España. In October 2020, he was named in the startlist for the 2020 Giro d'Italia.

== Major results ==
2015
4th Gran Premio Sportivi di Poggiana
2016
3rd Overall Tour of Bihor
5th Trofeo Città di San Vendemiano
6th Overall Tour of Malopolska
2017
1st Prologue Giro della Valle d'Aosta
1st Coppa Città di San Daniele
3rd Overall Giro del Belvedere
5th Gran Premio Sportivi di Poggiana
9th Coppa Collecchio
2018
8th Overall Tour of Turkey
2019
5th Trofeo Matteotti
2021
5th Overall Tirreno–Adriatico
2023
7th Overall Tour de Hongrie
2024
10th Overall O Gran Camiño
2025
8th Overall Okolo Slovenska
2026
1st Overall Tour of Japan

1st Stage 4 (TTT)
1st Stage 6

4th Overall Tour of Sharjah

1st Stage 4

6th Overall Settimana Internazionale di Coppi e Bartali
7th Overall Tour of Hellas
9th Overall Tour of Hainan

=== Grand Tour general classification results timeline ===
Grand Tour	2019	2020	2021	2022	2023	2024
Giro d'Italia	—	23	32	—		94
Tour de France	—	—	—	—	—	
Vuelta a España	54	—	—	54		

Legend
—	Did not compete
DNF	Did not finish
