= 2019 Tro-Bro Léon =

Cycling race

2019 UCI Europe Tour

Race details
- Dates: 22 April 2019
- Stages: 1
- Distance: 205.4 km (127.6 mi)
- Winning time: 5h 00' 20"

Results
	Winner	Andrea Vendrame (ITA)	(Androni Giocattoli–Sidermec)
	Second	Baptiste Planckaert (BEL)	(Wallonie Bruxelles)
	Third	Emil Vinjebo (DEN)	(Riwal Readynez)

The 2019 Tro-Bro Léon was a one-day road cycling race that took place on 22 April 2019. It was the 36th edition of the Tro-Bro Léon and was rated as a 1.1 event as part of the 2019 UCI Europe Tour. It was also the eighth event of the 2019 French Road Cycling Cup.

The race was won by Andrea Vendrame (Androni Giocattoli–Sidermec).

== Teams ==
Twenty teams were invited to take part in the race. These included two UCI WorldTeams, eleven UCI Professional Continental teams and seven UCI Continental teams.

UCI WorldTeams

- AG2R La Mondiale
- Groupama–FDJ

UCI Professional Continental Teams

- Androni Giocattoli–Sidermec
- Cofidis
- Delko–Marseille Provence
- Vital Concept–B&B Hotels
- Arkéa–Samsic
- Israel Cycling Academy
- Euskadi–Murias
- Wallonie Bruxelles
- Wanty–Gobert
- Riwal Readynez
- Total Direct Énergie

UCI Continental Teams

- Amore & Vita–Prodir
- EvoPro Racing
- Interpro Cycling Academy
- Madison Genesis
- St. Michel–Auber93
- Tarteletto–Isorex
- Natura4Ever–Roubaix–Lille Métropole

== Result ==
Result
Rank	Rider	Team	Time
1	Andrea Vendrame (ITA)	Androni Giocattoli–Sidermec	5h 00' 20"
2	Baptiste Planckaert (BEL)	Wallonie Bruxelles	+ 0"
3	Emil Vinjebo (DEN)	Riwal Readynez	+ 0"
4	Romain Hardy (FRA)	Arkéa–Samsic	+ 0"
5	Lilian Calmejane (FRA)	Total Direct Énergie	+ 0"
6	Marc Sarreau (FRA)	Groupama–FDJ	+ 0"
7	Mickaël Delage (FRA)	Groupama–FDJ	+ 0"
8	Kévin Le Cunff (FRA)	St. Michel–Auber93	+ 0"
9	Anthony Delaplace (FRA)	Arkéa–Samsic	+ 0"
10	Frederik Backaert (BEL)	Wanty–Gobert	+ 0"
