= Andrea Vendrame =

Italian cyclist (born 1994)

- Vendrame in 2026

Personal information
- Born: 20 July 1994 (age 32) Conegliano, Italy
- Height: 1.68 m (5 ft 6 in)
- Weight: 60 kg (132 lb)

Cycling career
- Sport: Cycling
- Current team: Team Jayco–AlUla
- Discipline: Road
- Role: Rider
- Rider type: Puncheur; Sprinter

Amateur teams
- 2013: Marchiol–Emisfero–Site
- 2015–2016: Zalf–Euromobil–Désirée–Fior

Professional teams
- 2014: Marchiol–Emisfero
- 2017–2019: Androni Giocattoli–Sidermec
- 2020–2025: AG2R La Mondiale
- 2026–: Team Jayco–AlUla

Major wins
- Grand Tours Giro d'Italia 2 individual stages (2021, 2024)
Medal record
Representing Italy
Men's road bicycle racing
European Championships
Bronze medal – third place	2016 Plumelec	Under-23 road race

Andrea Vendrame (born 20 July 1994) is an Italian cyclist, who currently rides for UCI WorldTeam Team Jayco–AlUla. Professional since 2014, he has most notably won the 12th stage of the 2021 Giro d'Italia, outsprinting Chris Hamilton from the breakaway.

== Major results ==
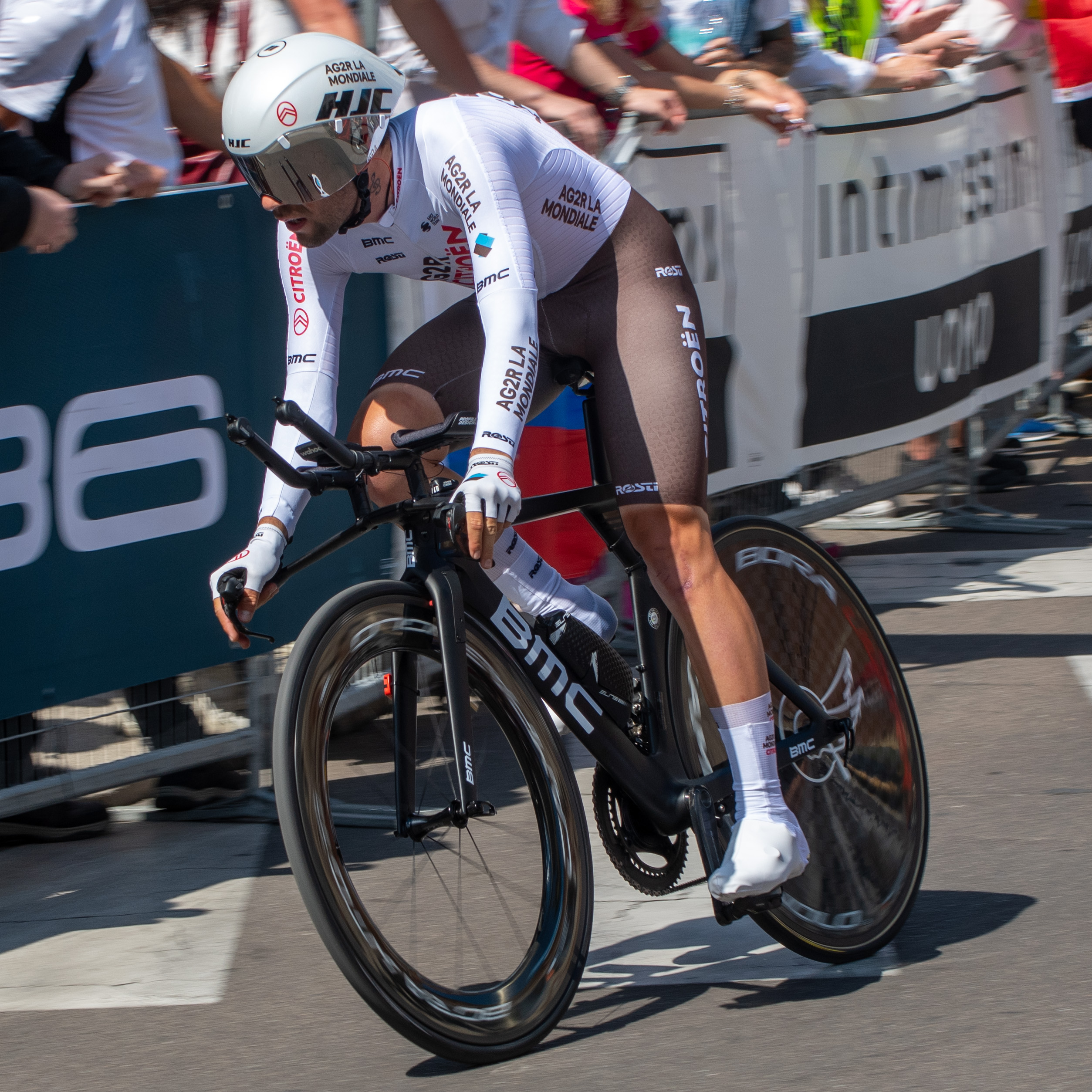
Vendrame in 2021

2014
10th Gran Premio della Liberazione
10th Trofeo Città di San Vendemiano
2015
1st Giro del Belvedere
5th Gran Premio della Liberazione
5th Giro del Medio Brenta
10th GP Capodarco
2016
2nd Ruota d'Oro
2nd Piccolo Giro di Lombardia
3rd Road race, UEC European Under-23 Road Championships
4th Coppa Sabatini
5th Giro del Belvedere
8th Gran Premio di Poggiana
2017
1st Mountains classification, Four Days of Dunkirk
4th Overall Boucles de la Mayenne
5th Gran Premio di Lugano
6th Overall Tour de Bretagne

1st Stage 7

7th Classic Loire-Atlantique
2018
3rd Paris–Camembert
4th La Roue Tourangelle
6th Overall Circuit de la Sarthe
9th Gran Premio di Lugano
2019 (2 pro wins)
1st Tro-Bro Léon
2nd Tour du Finistère
3rd GP Industria & Artigianato di Larciano
4th Tre Valli Varesine
5th Road race, National Road Championships
5th Overall Tour of Slovenia
5th Grand Prix of Aargau Canton
7th Giro della Toscana
8th Giro dell'Appennino
9th Overall Circuit de la Sarthe

1st Stage 4

9th Coppa Sabatini
10th Paris–Camembert
2020
4th Road race, National Road Championships
4th Paris–Camembert
4th Trofeo Laigueglia
6th Overall Tour de Wallonie
8th Race Torquay
2021 (2)
1st Stage 12 Giro d'Italia
Route d'Occitanie

1st Points classification
1st Stage 1

2nd Classic Grand Besançon Doubs
8th Trofeo Laigueglia
10th Tour du Jura
2022
5th GP Industria & Artigianato
5th GP Miguel Induráin
6th Milano–Torino
9th Coppa Bernocchi
Combativity award Stage 19 Giro d'Italia
2023
2nd Trofeo Laigueglia
3rd Muscat Classic
4th Veneto Classic
5th Clàssica Comunitat Valenciana 1969
8th Milano–Torino
Vuelta a España

Held after Stage 3

2024 (1)
1st Stage 19 Giro d'Italia
2nd Trofeo Laigueglia
10th Overall Tour du Limousin
2025 (2)
1st Stage 3 Tirreno–Adriatico
6th Coppa Agostoni
8th Overall Tour du Limousin

1st Stage 4

9th Overall Tour de l'Ain
2026
5th Trofeo Laigueglia
5th Trofeo Serra Tramuntana
5th Trofeo Matteotti
6th Milan–San Remo
7th Trofeo Calvià
8th Coppa Bernocchi
10th Bretagne Classic

=== Grand Tour general classification results timeline ===
Grand Tour	2018	2019	2020	2021	2022	2023	2024
Giro d'Italia	90	55	50	50	55	DNF	46
Tour de France	—	—	—	—	—	—	—
Vuelta a España	—	—	—	—	DNF	95	—

Legend
—	Did not compete
DNF	Did not finish
IP	Race in Progress
