= 2023 Mont Ventoux Dénivelé Challenge =

2023 UCI ProSeries

Race details
- Dates: 13 June 2023
- Stages: 1
- Distance: 98.3 km (61.08 mi)
- Winning time: 2h 48' 41"

Results
	Winner	Lenny Martinez (FRA)	(Groupama–FDJ)
	Second	Michael Woods (CAN)	(Israel–Premier Tech)
	Third	Simon Carr (GBR)	(EF Education–EasyPost)

The 2023 Mont Ventoux Dénivelé Challenge, officially known as CIC – Mont Ventoux, was the fifth edition of the Mont Ventoux Dénivelé Challenge road cycling one-day race, which was a category 1.Pro event on the 2023 UCI ProSeries.

Due to weather conditions, the race was shortened from 153 down to 98.3 kilometers and was shortened to only one ascent of Mont Ventoux, rather than the original plan of two ascents.

== Teams ==
Six UCI WorldTeams, seven UCI ProTeams, and three UCI Continental teams made up the sixteen teams that participated in the race.

UCI WorldTeams

- AG2R Citroën Team
- Arkéa–Samsic
- Cofidis
- EF Education–EasyPost
- Groupama–FDJ
- Movistar Team

UCI ProTeams

- Burgos BH
- Caja Rural–Seguros RGA
- Equipo Kern Pharma
- Euskaltel–Euskadi
- Israel–Premier Tech
- Team TotalEnergies
- Uno-X Pro Cycling Team

UCI Continental Teams

- CIC U Nantes Atlantique
- Electro Hiper Europa
- Nice Métropole Côte d'Azur

== Result ==
Results
Rank	Rider	Team	Time
1	Lenny Martinez (FRA)	Groupama–FDJ	2h 48' 41"
2	Michael Woods (CAN)	Israel–Premier Tech	+ 1"
3	Simon Carr (GBR)	EF Education–EasyPost	+ 1"
4	Cristian Rodríguez (ESP)	Arkéa–Samsic	+ 1"
5	Clément Champoussin (FRA)	Arkéa–Samsic	+ 13"
6	Iván Sosa (COL)	Movistar Team	+ 14"
7	Domenico Pozzovivo (ITA)	Israel–Premier Tech	+ 15"
8	Valentin Paret-Peintre (FRA)	AG2R Citroën Team	+ 20"
9	Diego Camargo (COL)	EF Education–EasyPost	+ 22"
10	Mikel Bizkarra (ESP)	Euskaltel–Euskadi	+ 29"
