= 2024 Trofeo Laigueglia =

2024 UCI ProSeries

Race details
- Dates: 28 February 2024
- Stages: 1
- Distance: 202 km (125.5 mi)
- Winning time: 5h 11' 10"

Results
	Winner	Lenny Martinez (FRA)	(Groupama–FDJ)
	Second	Andrea Vendrame (ITA)	(Decathlon–AG2R La Mondiale)
	Third	Juan Ayuso (ESP)	(UAE Team Emirates)

The 2024 Trofeo Laigueglia was a one-day road cycling race that took place on 28 February 2024 in and around Laigueglia. It was the 61st edition of the Trofeo Laigueglia and was rated as a 1.Pro event as part the 2024 UCI ProSeries.

== Teams ==
Twenty-three teams were invited to the race, consisting of nine UCI WorldTour teams, eight UCI ProTeams, and eight UCI Continental teams. Of the starting peloton of 172 riders, 98 finished.

UCI WorldTeams

- Arkéa–B&B Hotels
- Astana Qazaqstan Team
- Cofidis
- Decathlon–AG2R La Mondiale
- EF Education–EasyPost
- Groupama–FDJ
- Intermarché–Wanty
- Team Jayco–AlUla
- UAE Team Emirates

UCI ProTeams

- Bingoal WB
- Caja Rural–Seguros RGA
- Euskaltel–Euskadi
- Lotto–Dstny
- Team Corratec–Vini Fantini
- Polti–Kometa
- Tudor Pro Cycling Team
- VF Group–Bardiani–CSF–Faizanè

UCI Continental teams

- Biesse–Carrera
- General Store–Essegibi–Fratelli Curia
- JCL Team Ukyo
- MG.K Vis Colors for Peace
- Petrolike
- Team MBH Bank Colpack Ballan
- Team Technipes #inEmiliaRomagna
- Work Service–Vitalcare–Dynatek

== Result ==
Result
Rank	Rider	Team	Time
1	Lenny Martinez (FRA)	Groupama–FDJ	5h 11' 10"
2	Andrea Vendrame (ITA)	Decathlon–AG2R La Mondiale	+ 29"
3	Juan Ayuso (ESP)	UAE Team Emirates	+ 29"
4	Christian Scaroni (ITA)	Astana Qazaqstan Team	+ 29"
5	Jan Christen (SUI)	UAE Team Emirates	+ 29"
6	Darren Rafferty (IRE)	EF Education–EasyPost	+ 31"
7	Louis Barré (FRA)	Arkéa–B&B Hotels	+ 53"
8	Simone Velasco (ITA)	Astana Qazaqstan Team	+ 57"
9	Paul Lapeira (FRA)	Decathlon–AG2R La Mondiale	+ 57"
10	Lorenzo Rota (ITA)	Intermarché–Wanty	+ 57"
