= Reuben Thompson =

New Zealand cyclist (born 2001)

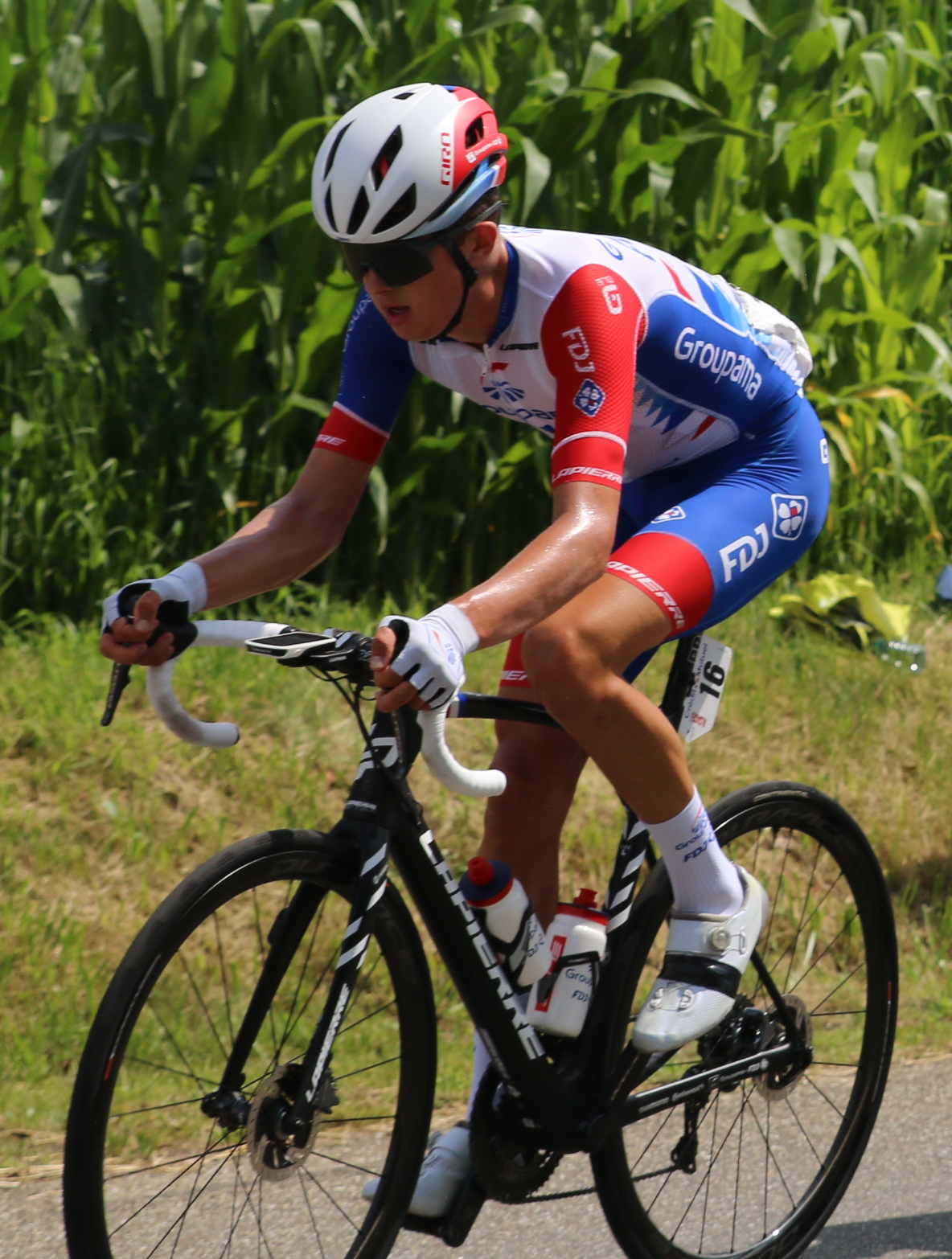
- Thompson during the fifth stage of the Tour Alsace 2021

Personal information
- Born: 15 February 2001 (age 25) Queenstown, New Zealand
- Height: 184 cm (6 ft 0 in)
- Weight: 62 kg (137 lb)

Cycling career
- Sport: Cycling
- Current team: Lotto–Intermarché
- Discipline: Road
- Role: Rider

Professional teams
- 2021–2022: Équipe Continentale Groupama–FDJ
- 2023–2024: Groupama–FDJ
- 2025–: Lotto

Reuben Thompson (born 15 February 2001) is a New Zealand professional racing cyclist, who currently rides for UCI WorldTeam Lotto–Intermarché.

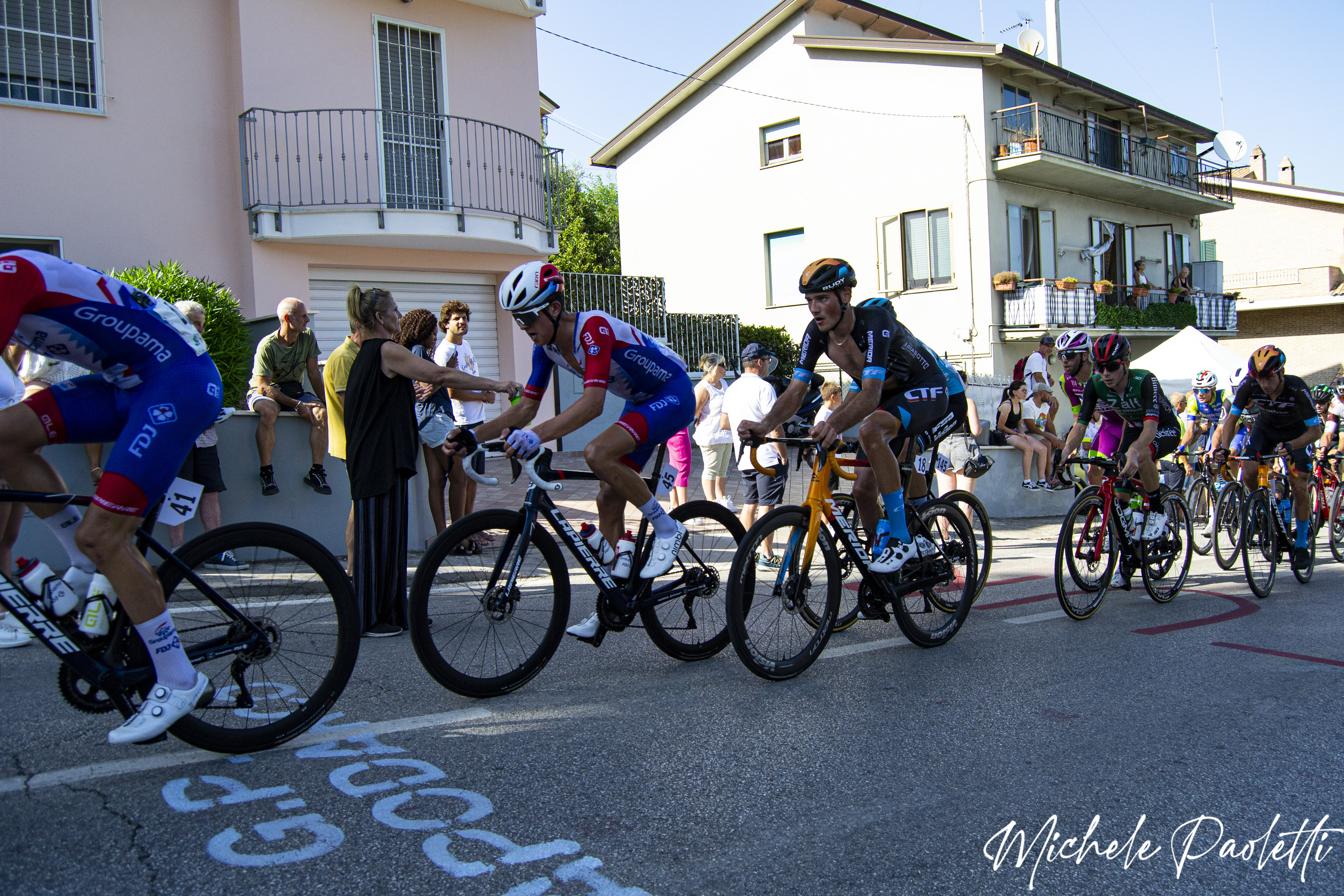
Reuben Thompson during the Capodarco GP 2022. Ph: Michele Paoletti.

== Career ==
In July 2021 Thompson took the biggest win of his career taking home all the main jerseys in the Giro della Valle d'Aosta. Starting in 2023, Thompson will ride for UCI WorldTeam Groupama–FDJ. Starting as the defending champion at the Giro della Valle d'Aosta in 2022 Thompson finished in second place overall behind fellow team-leader Lenny Martinez. In August he rode the GP Capodarco where he came fourth, 7 seconds down on the winner.

== Major results ==
2019
3rd Time trial, National Junior Road Championships
6th Overall Ain Bugey Valromey Tour
2020
1st Stage 3 Tour of Southland
2021
1st Overall Giro della Valle d'Aosta

1st Mountains classification
1st Points classification

1st Stage 1 (TTT) New Zealand Cycle Classic
3rd Overall Tour du Pays de Montbéliard
3rd Road race, National Under-23 Road Championships
5th Overall Ronde de l'Isard
2022
2nd Overall Circuit des Ardennes

1st Young rider classification

2nd Overall Giro della Valle d'Aosta

1st Stage 4

2nd Overall Ronde de l'Isard
4th Overall Tour Alsace
4th GP Capodarco
5th Overall Giro Ciclistico d'Italia
5th Trofeo Bonin Costruzioni
2023
4th Road race, National Road Championships

=== Grand Tour general classification results timeline ===
Grand Tour	2024
Giro d'Italia	—
Tour de France	—
Vuelta a España	94

Legend
—	Did not compete
DNF	Did not finish
