= Mercan'Tour Classic =

French one-day road cycling race

Mercan'Tour Classic Alpes-Maritimes

Race details
- Date: May
- Region: Alpes-Maritimes
- Discipline: Road
- Competition: UCI Europe Tour
- Type: One-day race
- Organiser: Club Alpes Azur
- Web site: mercantourclassic.com

History
- First edition: 2021
- Editions: 6 (as of 2026)
- First winner: Guillaume Martin (FRA)
- Most wins: No repeat winners
- Most recent: Ibon Ruiz (ESP)

The Mercan'Tour Classic Alpes-Maritimes is a French single-day cycling race held in Valberg in the Alpes-Maritimes region of France. The road cycling race was supposed to be first held in 2020, but was cancelled due to the COVID-19 pandemic. It is classified by the UCI as a category 1.1 event on the UCI Europe Tour.

== Winners ==
Year	Country	Rider	Team
2021	France	Guillaume Martin	Cofidis
2022	Denmark	Jakob Fuglsang	Israel–Premier Tech
2023	Ecuador	Richard Carapaz	EF Education–EasyPost
2024	France	Lenny Martinez	Groupama–FDJ
2025	Spain	Cristián Rodríguez	Arkéa–B&B Hotels
2026	Spain	Ibon Ruiz	Equipo Kern Pharma
