= Lenny Martinez (cyclist) =

French cyclist (born 2003)

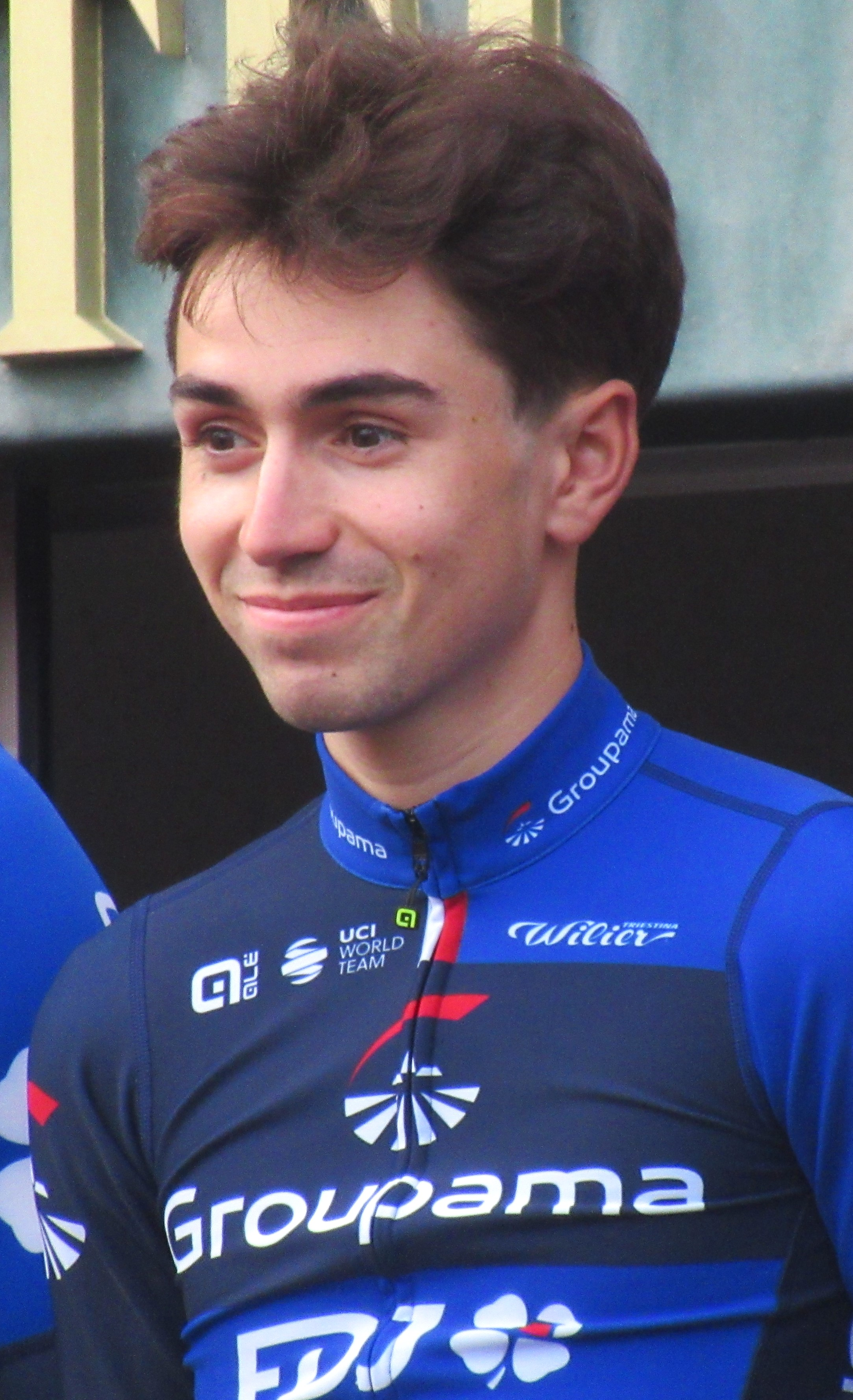
- Martinez in 2024

Personal information
- Born: 11 July 2003 (age 23) Cannes, France
- Height: 1.68 m (5 ft 6 in)
- Weight: 52 kg (115 lb)

Cycling career
- Sport: Cycling
- Current team: Team Bahrain Victorious
- Discipline: Road
- Role: Rider
- Rider type: Climbing specialist

Amateur team
- 2021: CC Varennes-Vauzelles Junior

Professional teams
- 2022: Équipe Continentale Groupama–FDJ
- 2023–2024: Groupama–FDJ
- 2025–: Team Bahrain Victorious

Major wins
- One-day races and Classics Mont Ventoux Dénivelé Challenge (2023) Trofeo Laigueglia (2024) Japan Cup (2025)
Medal record
Road cycling
Representing France
European Junior Championships
Bronze medal – third place	2021 Trentino	Road race

Lenny Martinez (born 11 July 2003) is a French professional racing cyclist, who currently rides for UCI WorldTeam Team Bahrain Victorious. He is the son, grandson and nephew of former racing cyclists Miguel, Mariano and Yannick Martinez respectively.

== Career ==
On 16 July 2022 during stage 4 of the Giro della Valle d'Aosta Martinez along with teammate Reuben Thompson were the last men standing from the group of favorites. Martinez, who had just extended his lead gave the win to Thompson. On 1 June 2022, Martinez got to ride for Groupama–FDJ as a development rider with the team at the 2022 Mercan'Tour Classic where he finished in eighth position, beating UCI WorldTour professional cyclists all while helping leader David Gaudu finish in fourth.

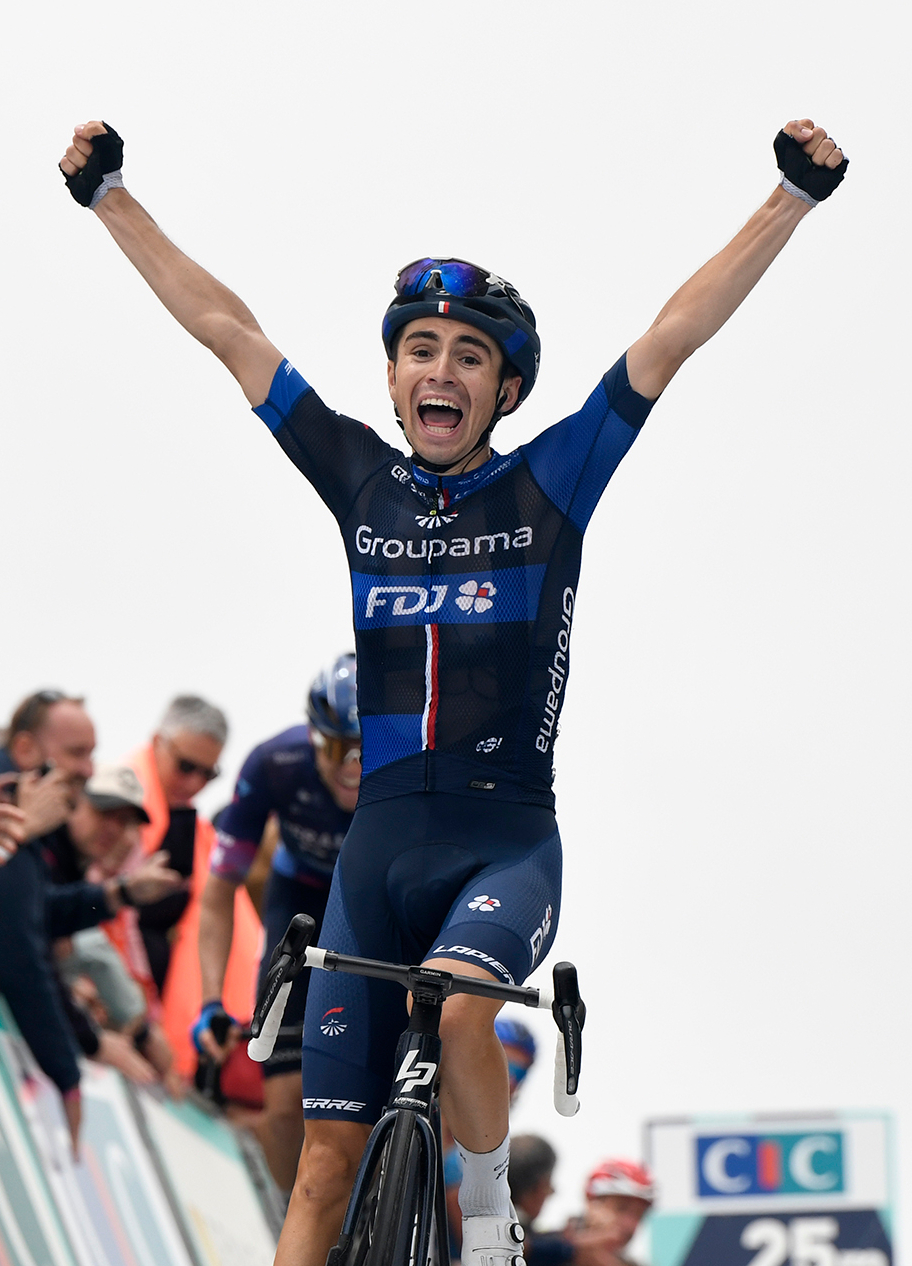
Martinez winning the 2023 Mont Ventoux Dénivelé Challenge

Groupama–FDJ signed Martinez into their UCI WorldTeam for 2023. in June, 2023 Martinez took his first professional win at the Mont Ventoux Dénivelé Challenge. On 31 August 2023, during the 6th stage of the 2023 Vuelta a España, he was part of a large breakaway that went all the way to the finish in the Astrophysical Observatory of Javalambre. He came second in the stage behind Sepp Kuss (Team Jumbo–Visma), but enough to take the red jersey by 8 seconds ahead of Kuss. He became the youngest leader ever in the history of the Vuelta. He also became the second youngest cyclist to wear a leader's jersey in a Grand Tour since 1904, at 20 years and 51 days, behind Henri Cornet's 19 years and 344 days in the 1904 Tour de France.

Martinez opened the 2024 season with a win at the Classic Var. He then competed at the O Gran Camiño, where he finished second overall to Jonas Vingegaard. At the end of February, he won the Trofeo Laigueglia with a 9 kilometer solo. At the 2024 Volta a Catalunya he won the young rider classification and finished seventh overall.

Martinez moved to Team Bahrain for the 2025 season. He rode in the Tour de France, where he wore the polka dot jersey for a few days, but was docked points for cheating for repeatedly getting help from the team car to help push him up a difficult climb.

== Major results ==
2021
1st Overall Giro della Lunigiana

1st Stage 3

3rd Road race, UEC European Junior Road Championships
National Junior Road Championships

3rd Road race
3rd Time trial

3rd Overall Ain Bugey Valromey Tour
3rd Classique des Alpes
2022
1st Overall Giro della Valle d'Aosta

1st Young rider classification

Ronde de l'Isard

1st Mountains classification
1st Stages 4 & 6

3rd Overall Giro Ciclistico d'Italia

1st Mountains classification
1st Young rider classification

8th Overall Tour de l'Avenir
8th Mercan'Tour Classic
2023 (1 pro win)
1st Mont Ventoux Dénivelé Challenge
2nd Classic Grand Besançon Doubs
4th Mercan'Tour Classic
8th Grand Prix La Marseillaise
Vuelta a España

Held after Stages 6–7
Held after Stages 6–9

2024 (5)
1st Trofeo Laigueglia
1st Classic Var
1st Classic Grand Besançon Doubs
1st Tour du Doubs
1st Mercan'Tour Classic
2nd Overall O Gran Camiño

1st Young rider classification

7th Overall Volta a Catalunya

1st Young rider classification

8th Overall Tour de Romandie
8th Strade Bianche
2025 (4)
1st Japan Cup
1st Stage 5 Paris–Nice
1st Stage 8 Critérium du Dauphiné
2nd Overall Tour de Romandie

1st Young rider classification
1st Stage 4

3rd Overall Tour des Alpes-Maritimes

1st Young rider classification

3rd Giro dell'Emilia
4th La Flèche Wallonne
5th Overall Volta a Catalunya
8th Classic Var
Tour de France

Held after Stages 10–11 & 14–15
Combativity award Stages 4 & 14

2026 (1)
2nd Overall Volta a Catalunya

1st Young rider classification

3rd Overall Tour de Romandie

1st Young rider classification

3rd Ardèche Classic
3rd La Drôme Classic
4th Giro della Toscana
5th Overall Tour de France
5th Overall Paris–Nice

1st Stage 8

5th Tour des Alpes-Maritimes
8th La Flèche Wallonne

=== General classification results timeline ===
Grand Tour general classification results
Grand Tour	2023	2024	2025	2026
Giro d'Italia	—	—	—	—
Tour de France	—	124	79	5
Vuelta a España	24	—	—	—
Major stage race general classification results
Race	2023	2024	2025	2026
Paris–Nice	—	—	24	5
Tirreno–Adriatico	—	—	—	—
Volta a Catalunya	12	7	5	2
Tour of the Basque Country	—	—	—	—
Tour de Romandie	28	8	2	3
Critérium du Dauphiné	18	—	28	—
Tour de Suisse	—	32	—	29

Legend
—	Did not compete
DNF	Did not finish
