= Classic Var =

Cycling race in France

Race details
- Date: February
- Region: Var
- Discipline: Road
- Competition: UCI Europe Tour
- Type: One-day race
- Web site: www.nicematin.com/cyclisme/classic-var/

History
- First edition: 2024
- Editions: 2 (as of 2025)
- First winner: Lenny Martinez (FRA)
- Most wins: No repeat winners
- Most recent: Christian Scaroni (ITA)

The Classic Var is a one-day road cycling race held annually in the department of Var, France. It is on the UCI Europe Tour calendar as a 1.1 rated event.

== Winners ==
Year	Country	Rider	Team
2024	France	Lenny Martinez	Groupama–FDJ
2025	Italy	Christian Scaroni	XDS Astana Team
