= Classic Grand Besançon Doubs =

One-day road cycling race in France

Race details
- Date: April
- Region: Doubs
- Discipline: Road
- Competition: UCI Europe Tour
- Type: One-day race
- Web site: www.classicgrandbesancondoubs.com

History
- First edition: 2021
- Editions: 6 (as of 2026)
- First winner: Biniam Girmay (ERI)
- Most wins: No repeat winners
- Most recent: Jordan Jegat (FRA)

The Classic Grand Besançon Doubs is a one-day road cycling race in April in the region of Doubs, France. It is on the UCI Europe Tour calendar as a 1.1 rated event.

== Winners ==
| Year | Country | Rider | Team |
|---|---|---|---|
| 2021 | Eritrea | Biniam Girmay | Intermarché–Wanty–Gobert Matériaux |
| 2022 | Spain | Jesús Herrada | Cofidis |
| 2023 | France | Victor Lafay | Cofidis |
| 2024 | France | Lenny Martinez | Groupama–FDJ |
| 2025 | France | Guillaume Martin | Groupama–FDJ |
| 2026 | France | Jordan Jegat | Team TotalEnergies |
