= List of teams and cyclists in the 2024 Vuelta a España =

List of cyclists

The following is a list of teams and cyclists who participated in the 2024 Vuelta a España.

== Teams ==
UCI WorldTeams

- Alpecin–Deceuninck
- Arkéa–B&B Hotels
- Astana Qazaqstan Team
- Cofidis
- Decathlon–AG2R La Mondiale
- EF Education–EasyPost
- Groupama–FDJ
- Ineos Grenadiers
- Intermarché–Wanty
- Lidl–Trek
- Movistar Team
- Red Bull–Bora–Hansgrohe
- Soudal–Quick-Step
- Team Bahrain Victorious
- Team dsm–firmenich PostNL
- Team Jayco–AlUla
- Visma–Lease a Bike
- UAE Team Emirates

UCI ProTeams

- Equipo Kern Pharma
- Euskaltel–Euskadi
- Israel–Premier Tech
- Lotto–Dstny

== Cyclists ==
Legend
| No. | Starting number worn by the rider during the Vuelta |
| Pos. | Position in the general classification |
| Time | Deficit to the winner of the general classification |
| ‡ | Denotes riders born on or after 1 January 1999, and thus eligible for the young rider classification |
| | Denotes the winner of the general classification |
| | Denotes the winner of the points classification |
| | Denotes the winner of the mountains classification |
| | Denotes the winner of the young rider classification |
| | Denotes the winner of the team classification |
| | Denotes the winner of the combativity award |
| DNS | Denotes a rider who did not start, followed by the stage before which he withdrew |
| DNF | Denotes a rider who did not finish, followed by the stage in which he withdrew |
| DSQ | Denotes a rider who was disqualified from the race, followed by the stage in which this occurred |
| OTL | Denotes a rider who finished outside the time limit, followed by the stage in which he did so |
Ages correct as of Saturday 17 August 2024, the date on which the Vuelta began

=== By starting number ===
| No. | Name | Nationality | Team | Age | Pos. | GC Time |
|---|---|---|---|---|---|---|
| 1 | Sepp Kuss | United States | Visma–Lease a Bike | 29 | 14 | + 20' 25" |
| 2 | Edoardo Affini | Italy | Visma–Lease a Bike | 28 | 119 | + 4h 36' 53" |
| 3 | Robert Gesink | Netherlands | Visma–Lease a Bike | 38 | 52 | + 2h 34' 22" |
| 4 | Steven Kruijswijk | Netherlands | Visma–Lease a Bike | 37 | 19 | + 1h 01' 53" |
| 5 | Cian Uijtdebroeks ‡ | Belgium | Visma–Lease a Bike | 21 | DNS-15 | – |
| 6 | Attila Valter | Hungary | Visma–Lease a Bike | 26 | 25 | + 1h 22' 31" |
| 7 | Wout van Aert | Belgium | Visma–Lease a Bike | 29 | DNF-16 | – |
| 8 | Dylan van Baarle | Netherlands | Visma–Lease a Bike | 32 | DNF-2 | – |
| 11 | João Almeida | Portugal | UAE Team Emirates | 26 | DNS-9 | – |
| 12 | Filippo Baroncini ‡ | Italy | UAE Team Emirates | 23 | 66 | + 3h 06' 20" |
| 13 | Isaac del Toro ‡ | Mexico | UAE Team Emirates | 20 | 36 | + 1h 57' 27" |
| 14 | Pavel Sivakov | France | UAE Team Emirates | 27 | 9 | + 10' 04" |
| 15 | Jay Vine | Australia | UAE Team Emirates | 28 | 57 | + 2h 42' 13" |
| 16 | Adam Yates | Great Britain | UAE Team Emirates | 32 | 12 | + 15' 40" |
| 17 | Brandon McNulty | United States | UAE Team Emirates | 26 | 54 | + 2h 37' 44" |
| 18 | Marc Soler | Spain | UAE Team Emirates | 30 | 41 | + 2h 10' 37" |
| 21 | Thymen Arensman ‡ | Netherlands | Ineos Grenadiers | 24 | DNS-11 | – |
| 22 | Laurens De Plus | Belgium | Ineos Grenadiers | 28 | DNS-10 | – |
| 23 | Kim Heiduk ‡ | Germany | Ineos Grenadiers | 24 | 107 | + 4h 12' 43" |
| 24 | Jhonatan Narváez | Ecuador | Ineos Grenadiers | 27 | 50 | + 2h 26' 46" |
| 25 | Brandon Rivera | Colombia | Ineos Grenadiers | 28 | 95 | + 3h 55' 58" |
| 26 | Carlos Rodríguez ‡ | Spain | Ineos Grenadiers | 23 | 10 | + 11' 19" |
| 27 | Óscar Rodríguez | Spain | Ineos Grenadiers | 29 | 24 | + 1h 16' 05" |
| 28 | Josh Tarling ‡ | Great Britain | Ineos Grenadiers | 20 | DNF-9 | – |
| 31 | Mikel Landa | Spain | Soudal–Quick-Step | 34 | 8 | + 8' 48" |
| 32 | Kasper Asgreen | Denmark | Soudal–Quick-Step | 29 | 120 | + 4h 39' 48" |
| 33 | Mattia Cattaneo | Italy | Soudal–Quick-Step | 33 | 23 | + 1h 13' 28" |
| 34 | James Knox | Great Britain | Soudal–Quick-Step | 28 | 67 | + 3h 07' 33" |
| 35 | William Junior Lecerf ‡ | Belgium | Soudal–Quick-Step | 21 | 44 | + 2h 15' 24" |
| 36 | Casper Pedersen | Denmark | Soudal–Quick-Step | 28 | 127 | + 5h 01' 24" |
| 37 | Mauri Vansevenant ‡ | Belgium | Soudal–Quick-Step | 25 | 49 | + 2h 24' 54" |
| 38 | Louis Vervaeke | Belgium | Soudal–Quick-Step | 30 | 59 | + 2h 47' 05" |
| 41 | Mattias Skjelmose ‡ | Denmark | Lidl–Trek | 23 | 5 | + 5' 49" |
| 42 | Giulio Ciccone | Italy | Lidl–Trek | 29 | DNF-10 | – |
| 43 | Tao Geoghegan Hart | Great Britain | Lidl–Trek | 29 | 62 | + 2h 51' 50" |
| 44 | Patrick Konrad | Austria | Lidl–Trek | 32 | DNS-11 | – |
| 45 | Sam Oomen | Netherlands | Lidl–Trek | 29 | 33 | + 1h 51' 52" |
| 46 | Mathias Vacek ‡ | Czechia | Lidl–Trek | 22 | 61 | + 2h 51' 36" |
| 47 | Otto Vergaerde | Belgium | Lidl–Trek | 30 | 93 | + 3h 53' 02" |
| 48 | Carlos Verona | Spain | Lidl–Trek | 31 | 32 | + 1h 50' 59" |
| 51 | Ben O'Connor | Australia | Decathlon–AG2R La Mondiale | 28 | 2 | + 2' 36" |
| 52 | Bruno Armirail | France | Decathlon–AG2R La Mondiale | 30 | 69 | + 3h 09' 03" |
| 53 | Clément Berthet | France | Decathlon–AG2R La Mondiale | 27 | 20 | + 1h 04' 13" |
| 54 | Geoffrey Bouchard | France | Decathlon–AG2R La Mondiale | 32 | 108 | + 4h 15' 26" |
| 55 | Sander De Pestel | Belgium | Decathlon–AG2R La Mondiale | 25 | DNS-17 | – |
| 56 | Felix Gall | Austria | Decathlon–AG2R La Mondiale | 26 | 29 | + 1h 42' 00" |
| 57 | Victor Lafay | France | Decathlon–AG2R La Mondiale | 28 | 109 | + 4h 15' 45" |
| 58 | Valentin Paret-Peintre ‡ | France | Decathlon–AG2R La Mondiale | 23 | 45 | + 2h 17' 55" |
| 61 | Primož Roglič | Slovenia | Red Bull–Bora–Hansgrohe | 34 | 1 | 81h 49' 18" |
| 62 | Roger Adrià | Spain | Red Bull–Bora–Hansgrohe | 26 | 43 | + 2h 12' 41" |
| 63 | Giovanni Aleotti ‡ | Italy | Red Bull–Bora–Hansgrohe | 25 | 38 | + 2h 00' 03" |
| 64 | Nico Denz | Germany | Red Bull–Bora–Hansgrohe | 30 | OTL-20 | – |
| 65 | Patrick Gamper | Austria | Red Bull–Bora–Hansgrohe | 27 | DNF-20 | – |
| 66 | Florian Lipowitz ‡ | Germany | Red Bull–Bora–Hansgrohe | 23 | 7 | + 7' 05" |
| 67 | Daniel Martínez | Colombia | Red Bull–Bora–Hansgrohe | 28 | DNF-20 | – |
| 68 | Aleksandr Vlasov | | Red Bull–Bora–Hansgrohe | 28 | 18 | + 55' 05" |
| 71 | Kaden Groves | Australia | Alpecin–Deceuninck | 25 | 100 | + 4h 05' 32" |
| 72 | Maurice Ballerstedt ‡ | Germany | Alpecin–Deceuninck | 23 | 126 | + 4h 55' 15" |
| 73 | Quinten Hermans | Belgium | Alpecin–Deceuninck | 29 | 80 | + 3h 27' 33" |
| 74 | Juri Hollmann ‡ | Germany | Alpecin–Deceuninck | 24 | 96 | + 3h 57' 33" |
| 75 | Xandro Meurisse | Belgium | Alpecin–Deceuninck | 32 | 55 | + 2h 38' 10" |
| 76 | Edward Planckaert | Belgium | Alpecin–Deceuninck | 29 | 116 | + 4h 33' 11" |
| 77 | Oscar Riesebeek | Netherlands | Alpecin–Deceuninck | 31 | 130 | + 5h 04' 06" |
| 78 | Luca Vergallito | Italy | Alpecin–Deceuninck | 26 | 105 | + 4h 11' 26" |
| 81 | Michael Woods | Canada | Israel–Premier Tech | 37 | DNS-17 | – |
| 82 | George Bennett | New Zealand | Israel–Premier Tech | 34 | 34 | + 1h 52' 43" |
| 83 | Marco Frigo ‡ | Italy | Israel–Premier Tech | 24 | 53 | + 2h 36' 15" |
| 84 | Nadav Raisberg ‡ | Israel | Israel–Premier Tech | 23 | 113 | + 4h 25' 35" |
| 85 | Matthew Riccitello ‡ | United States | Israel–Premier Tech | 22 | 30 | + 1h 46' 37" |
| 86 | Riley Sheehan ‡ | United States | Israel–Premier Tech | 24 | 123 | + 4h 45' 08" |
| 87 | Corbin Strong ‡ | New Zealand | Israel–Premier Tech | 24 | DNS-18 | – |
| 88 | Dylan Teuns | Belgium | Israel–Premier Tech | 32 | 74 | + 3h 12' 45" |
| 91 | Lennert Van Eetvelt ‡ | Belgium | Lotto–Dstny | 23 | DNS-12 | – |
| 92 | Victor Campenaerts | Belgium | Lotto–Dstny | 32 | 111 | + 4h 19' 08" |
| 93 | Thomas De Gendt | Belgium | Lotto–Dstny | 37 | 88 | + 3h 45' 35" |
| 94 | Andreas Kron | Denmark | Lotto–Dstny | 26 | DNS-7 | – |
| 95 | Arjen Livyns | Belgium | Lotto–Dstny | 29 | 91 | + 3h 51' 39" |
| 96 | Sylvain Moniquet | Belgium | Lotto–Dstny | 26 | 110 | + 4h 18' 08" |
| 97 | Eduardo Sepúlveda | Argentina | Lotto–Dstny | 33 | 86 | + 3h 39' 48" |
| 98 | Jonas Gregaard | Denmark | Lotto–Dstny | 28 | 77 | + 3h 25' 36" |
| 101 | David Gaudu | France | Groupama–FDJ | 27 | 6 | + 6' 32" |
| 102 | Sven Erik Bystrøm | Norway | Groupama–FDJ | 32 | 117 | + 4h 34' 06" |
| 103 | Kevin Geniets | Luxembourg | Groupama–FDJ | 27 | DNF-12 | – |
| 104 | Lorenzo Germani ‡ | Italy | Groupama–FDJ | 22 | 97 | + 3h 59' 24" |
| 105 | Stefan Küng | Switzerland | Groupama–FDJ | 30 | 39 | + 2h 01' 27" |
| 106 | Quentin Pacher | France | Groupama–FDJ | 32 | 21 | + 1h 09' 30" |
| 107 | Rémy Rochas | France | Groupama–FDJ | 28 | DNF-16 | – |
| 108 | Reuben Thompson ‡ | New Zealand | Groupama–FDJ | 23 | 94 | + 3h 55' 28" |
| 111 | Richard Carapaz | Ecuador | EF Education–EasyPost | 31 | 4 | + 4' 02" |
| 112 | Rui Costa | Portugal | EF Education–EasyPost | 37 | DNF-5 | – |
| 113 | Owain Doull | Great Britain | EF Education–EasyPost | 31 | 118 | + 4h 36' 34" |
| 114 | Darren Rafferty ‡ | Ireland | EF Education–EasyPost | 21 | 75 | + 3h 12' 47" |
| 115 | James Shaw | Great Britain | EF Education–EasyPost | 28 | 98 | + 4h 00' 47" |
| 116 | Harry Sweeny | Australia | EF Education–EasyPost | 26 | 78 | + 3h 27' 12" |
| 117 | Rigoberto Urán | Colombia | EF Education–EasyPost | 37 | DNF-6 | – |
| 118 | Jefferson Alexander Cepeda | Ecuador | EF Education–EasyPost | 26 | 46 | + 2h 21' 31" |
| 121 | Enric Mas | Spain | Movistar Team | 29 | 3 | + 3' 13" |
| 122 | Jorge Arcas | Spain | Movistar Team | 32 | 112 | + 4h 21' 42" |
| 123 | Carlos Canal ‡ | Spain | Movistar Team | 23 | 70 | + 3h 09' 06" |
| 124 | Oier Lazkano ‡ | Spain | Movistar Team | 24 | 92 | + 3h 52' 00" |
| 125 | Nelson Oliveira | Portugal | Movistar Team | 35 | 73 | + 3h 11' 45" |
| 126 | Nairo Quintana | Colombia | Movistar Team | 34 | 31 | + 1h 49' 11" |
| 127 | Einer Rubio | Colombia | Movistar Team | 26 | 27 | + 1h 39' 22" |
| 128 | Pelayo Sánchez ‡ | Spain | Movistar Team | 24 | DNF-15 | – |
| 131 | Antonio Tiberi ‡ | Italy | Team Bahrain Victorious | 23 | DNF-9 | – |
| 132 | Damiano Caruso | Italy | Team Bahrain Victorious | 36 | DNS-7 | – |
| 133 | Kamil Gradek | Poland | Team Bahrain Victorious | 33 | 133 | + 5h 14' 00" |
| 134 | Jack Haig | Australia | Team Bahrain Victorious | 30 | 22 | + 1h 11' 45" |
| 135 | Rainer Kepplinger | Austria | Team Bahrain Victorious | 26 | DNF-9 | – |
| 136 | Fran Miholjević ‡ | Croatia | Team Bahrain Victorious | 22 | 87 | + 3h 42' 50" |
| 137 | Jasha Sütterlin | Germany | Team Bahrain Victorious | 31 | 121 | + 4h 42' 07" |
| 138 | Torstein Træen | Norway | Team Bahrain Victorious | 29 | 60 | + 2h 50' 48" |
| 141 | Eddie Dunbar | Ireland | Team Jayco–AlUla | 27 | 11 | + 14' 40" |
| 142 | Welay Berhe ‡ | Ethiopia | Team Jayco–AlUla | 22 | DNS-13 | – |
| 143 | Alessandro De Marchi | Italy | Team Jayco–AlUla | 38 | 125 | + 4h 53' 56" |
| 144 | Felix Engelhardt ‡ | Germany | Team Jayco–AlUla | 23 | 103 | + 4h 09' 17" |
| 145 | Chris Harper | Australia | Team Jayco–AlUla | 29 | DNF-11 | – |
| 146 | Mauro Schmid ‡ | Switzerland | Team Jayco–AlUla | 24 | 71 | + 3h 10' 41" |
| 147 | Callum Scotson | Australia | Team Jayco–AlUla | 28 | DNS-16 | – |
| 148 | Filippo Zana ‡ | Italy | Team Jayco–AlUla | 25 | 56 | + 2h 39' 10" |
| 151 | Cristián Rodríguez | Spain | Arkéa–B&B Hotels | 29 | 13 | + 19' 48" |
| 152 | Élie Gesbert | France | Arkéa–B&B Hotels | 29 | DNS-8 | – |
| 153 | Thibault Guernalec | France | Arkéa–B&B Hotels | 27 | 132 | + 5h 04' 48" |
| 154 | Simon Guglielmi | France | Arkéa–B&B Hotels | 27 | 47 | + 2h 22' 12" |
| 155 | Laurens Huys | Belgium | Arkéa–B&B Hotels | 25 | 79 | + 3h 27' 30" |
| 156 | Mathis Le Berre ‡ | France | Arkéa–B&B Hotels | 23 | 76 | + 3h 23' 22" |
| 157 | Łukasz Owsian | Poland | Arkéa–B&B Hotels | 34 | 89 | + 3h 45' 45" |
| 158 | Michel Ries | Luxembourg | Arkéa–B&B Hotels | 26 | DNF-13 | – |
| 161 | Louis Meintjes | South Africa | Intermarché–Wanty | 32 | 28 | + 1h 39' 37" |
| 162 | Vito Braet ‡ | Belgium | Intermarché–Wanty | 23 | 81 | + 3h 32' 34" |
| 163 | Kobe Goossens | Belgium | Intermarché–Wanty | 28 | DNS-10 | – |
| 164 | Arne Marit ‡ | Belgium | Intermarché–Wanty | 25 | 122 | + 4h 42' 18" |
| 165 | Tom Paquot ‡ | Belgium | Intermarché–Wanty | 24 | DNS-16 | – |
| 166 | Simone Petilli | Italy | Intermarché–Wanty | 31 | 90 | + 3h 46' 39" |
| 167 | Lorenzo Rota | Italy | Intermarché–Wanty | 29 | DNS-11 | – |
| 168 | Rein Taaramäe | Estonia | Intermarché–Wanty | 37 | DNF-18 | – |
| 171 | Max Poole ‡ | Great Britain | Team dsm–firmenich PostNL | 21 | 35 | + 1h 56' 35" |
| 172 | Pavel Bittner ‡ | Czechia | Team dsm–firmenich PostNL | 21 | 115 | + 4h 31' 33" |
| 173 | Chris Hamilton | Australia | Team dsm–firmenich PostNL | 29 | 68 | + 3h 08' 16" |
| 174 | Gijs Leemreize ‡ | Netherlands | Team dsm–firmenich PostNL | 24 | 84 | + 3h 37' 54" |
| 175 | Enzo Leijnse ‡ | Netherlands | Team dsm–firmenich PostNL | 23 | 129 | + 5h 02' 45" |
| 176 | Tim Naberman ‡ | Netherlands | Team dsm–firmenich PostNL | 25 | 135 | + 5h 21' 03" |
| 177 | Martijn Tusveld | Netherlands | Team dsm–firmenich PostNL | 30 | 63 | + 2h 54' 38" |
| 178 | Julius van den Berg | Netherlands | Team dsm–firmenich PostNL | 27 | 131 | + 5h 04' 41" |
| 181 | Guillaume Martin | France | Cofidis | 31 | 15 | + 31' 34" |
| 182 | Thomas Champion ‡ | France | Cofidis | 24 | 82 | + 3h 36' 16" |
| 183 | Bryan Coquard | France | Cofidis | 32 | DNF-8 | – |
| 184 | Rubén Fernández | Spain | Cofidis | 33 | DNS-14 | – |
| 185 | Ion Izagirre | Spain | Cofidis | 35 | 37 | + 1h 59' 25" |
| 186 | Jesús Herrada | Spain | Cofidis | 34 | 85 | + 3h 39' 38" |
| 187 | Jonathan Lastra | Spain | Cofidis | 31 | DNS-13 | – |
| 188 | Kenny Elissonde | France | Cofidis | 33 | DNF-6 | – |
| 191 | Lorenzo Fortunato | Italy | Astana Qazaqstan Team | 28 | 16 | + 40' 43" |
| 192 | Gleb Brussenskiy ‡ | Kazakhstan | Astana Qazaqstan Team | 24 | 124 | + 4h 45' 35" |
| 193 | Gianmarco Garofoli ‡ | Italy | Astana Qazaqstan Team | 21 | 48 | + 2h 22' 25" |
| 194 | Harold Martín López ‡ | Ecuador | Astana Qazaqstan Team | 23 | DNS-10 | – |
| 195 | Ide Schelling | Netherlands | Astana Qazaqstan Team | 26 | 134 | + 5h 19' 49" |
| 196 | Harold Tejada | Colombia | Astana Qazaqstan Team | 27 | 40 | + 2h 09' 03" |
| 197 | Santiago Umba ‡ | Colombia | Astana Qazaqstan Team | 21 | 106 | + 4h 11' 48" |
| 198 | Nicolas Vinokurov ‡ | Kazakhstan | Astana Qazaqstan Team | 22 | 128 | + 5h 02' 17" |
| 201 | Urko Berrade | Spain | Equipo Kern Pharma | 26 | 42 | + 2h 10' 47" |
| 202 | Pablo Castrillo ‡ | Spain | Equipo Kern Pharma | 23 | 64 | + 3h 00' 12" |
| 203 | Jorge Gutiérrez ‡ | Spain | Equipo Kern Pharma | 21 | 99 | + 4h 02' 04" |
| 204 | Unai Iribar ‡ | Spain | Equipo Kern Pharma | 25 | 83 | + 3h 37' 42" |
| 205 | Pau Miquel ‡ | Spain | Equipo Kern Pharma | 23 | 58 | + 2h 44' 50" |
| 206 | José Félix Parra | Spain | Equipo Kern Pharma | 27 | 17 | + 51' 33" |
| 207 | Ibon Ruiz ‡ | Spain | Equipo Kern Pharma | 25 | 101 | + 4h 06' 57" |
| 208 | Antonio Jesús Soto | Spain | Equipo Kern Pharma | 29 | 114 | + 4h 28' 52" |
| 211 | Txomin Juaristi | Spain | Euskaltel–Euskadi | 29 | DNF-20 | – |
| 212 | Jon Aberasturi | Spain | Euskaltel–Euskadi | 35 | DNF-6 | – |
| 213 | Xabier Berasategi ‡ | Spain | Euskaltel–Euskadi | 24 | 102 | + 4h 08' 31" |
| 214 | Mikel Bizkarra | Spain | Euskaltel–Euskadi | 34 | 26 | + 1h 37' 38" |
| 215 | Joan Bou | Spain | Euskaltel–Euskadi | 27 | 72 | + 3h 11' 05" |
| 216 | Xabier Isasa ‡ | Spain | Euskaltel–Euskadi | 22 | 104 | + 4h 09' 31" |
| 217 | Gotzon Martín | Spain | Euskaltel–Euskadi | 28 | 51 | + 2h 27' 06" |
| 218 | Luis Ángel Maté | Spain | Euskaltel–Euskadi | 40 | 65 | + 3h 02' 34" |

=== By team ===
(Netherlands) Visma–Lease a Bike (TVL)
| No. | Rider | Pos. |
|---|---|---|
| 1 | Sepp Kuss (USA) | 14 |
| 2 | Edoardo Affini (ITA) | 119 |
| 3 | Robert Gesink (NED) | 52 |
| 4 | Steven Kruijswijk (NED) | 19 |
| 5 | Cian Uijtdebroeks (BEL) | DNS-15 |
| 6 | Attila Valter (HUN) | 25 |
| 7 | Wout van Aert (BEL) | DNF-16 |
| 8 | Dylan van Baarle (NED) | DNF-2 |

(United Arab Emirates) UAE Team Emirates (UAD)
| No. | Rider | Pos. |
|---|---|---|
| 11 | João Almeida (POR) | DNS-9 |
| 12 | Filippo Baroncini (ITA) | 66 |
| 13 | Isaac del Toro (MEX) | 36 |
| 14 | Pavel Sivakov (FRA) | 9 |
| 15 | Jay Vine (AUS) | 57 |
| 16 | Adam Yates (GBR) | 12 |
| 17 | Brandon McNulty (USA) | 54 |
| 18 | Marc Soler (ESP) | 41 |

(United Kingdom) Ineos Grenadiers (IGD)
| No. | Rider | Pos. |
|---|---|---|
| 21 | Thymen Arensman (NED) | DNS-11 |
| 22 | Laurens De Plus (BEL) | DNS-10 |
| 23 | Kim Heiduk (GER) | 107 |
| 24 | Jhonatan Narváez (ECU) | 50 |
| 25 | Brandon Rivera (COL) | 95 |
| 26 | Carlos Rodríguez (ESP) | 10 |
| 27 | Óscar Rodríguez (ESP) | 24 |
| 28 | Joshua Tarling (GBR) | DNF-9 |

(Belgium) Soudal–Quick-Step (SOQ)
| No. | Rider | Pos. |
|---|---|---|
| 31 | Mikel Landa (ESP) | 8 |
| 32 | Kasper Asgreen (DEN) | 120 |
| 33 | Mattia Cattaneo (ITA) | 23 |
| 34 | James Knox (GBR) | 67 |
| 35 | William Junior Lecerf (BEL) | 44 |
| 36 | Casper Pedersen (DEN) | 127 |
| 37 | Mauri Vansevenant (BEL) | 49 |
| 38 | Louis Vervaeke (BEL) | 59 |

(United States) Lidl–Trek (LTK)
| No. | Rider | Pos. |
|---|---|---|
| 41 | Mattias Skjelmose (DEN) | 5 |
| 42 | Giulio Ciccone (ITA) | DNF-10 |
| 43 | Tao Geoghegan Hart (GBR) | 62 |
| 44 | Patrick Konrad (AUT) | DNS-11 |
| 45 | Sam Oomen (NED) | 33 |
| 46 | Mathias Vacek (CZE) | 61 |
| 47 | Otto Vergaerde (BEL) | 93 |
| 48 | Carlos Verona (ESP) | 32 |

(France) Decathlon–AG2R La Mondiale (DAT)
| No. | Rider | Pos. |
|---|---|---|
| 51 | Ben O'Connor (AUS) | 2 |
| 52 | Bruno Armirail (FRA) | 69 |
| 53 | Clément Berthet (FRA) | 20 |
| 54 | Geoffrey Bouchard (FRA) | 108 |
| 55 | Sander De Pestel (BEL) | DNS-17 |
| 56 | Felix Gall (AUT) | 29 |
| 57 | Victor Lafay (FRA) | 109 |
| 58 | Valentin Paret-Peintre (FRA) | 45 |

(Germany) Red Bull–Bora–Hansgrohe (RBH)
| No. | Rider | Pos. |
|---|---|---|
| 61 | Primož Roglič (SLO) | 1 |
| 62 | Roger Adrià (ESP) | 43 |
| 63 | Giovanni Aleotti (ITA) | 38 |
| 64 | Nico Denz (GER) | OTL-20 |
| 65 | Patrick Gamper (AUT) | DNF-20 |
| 66 | Florian Lipowitz (GER) | 7 |
| 67 | Daniel Martínez (COL) | DNF-20 |
| 68 | Aleksandr Vlasov | 18 |

(Belgium) Alpecin–Deceuninck (ADC)
| No. | Rider | Pos. |
|---|---|---|
| 71 | Kaden Groves (AUS) | 100 |
| 72 | Maurice Ballerstedt (GER) | 126 |
| 73 | Quinten Hermans (BEL) | 80 |
| 74 | Juri Hollmann (GER) | 96 |
| 75 | Xandro Meurisse (BEL) | 55 |
| 76 | Edward Planckaert (BEL) | 116 |
| 77 | Oscar Riesebeek (NED) | 130 |
| 78 | Luca Vergallito (ITA) | 105 |

Israel–Premier Tech (IPT)
| No. | Rider | Pos. |
|---|---|---|
| 81 | Michael Woods (CAN) | DNS-17 |
| 82 | George Bennett (NZL) | 34 |
| 83 | Marco Frigo (ITA) | 53 |
| 84 | Nadav Raisberg (ISR) | 113 |
| 85 | Matthew Riccitello (USA) | 30 |
| 86 | Riley Sheehan (USA) | 123 |
| 87 | Corbin Strong (NZL) | DNS-18 |
| 88 | Dylan Teuns (BEL) | 74 |

(Belgium) Lotto–Dstny (LTD)
| No. | Rider | Pos. |
|---|---|---|
| 91 | Lennert Van Eetvelt (BEL) | DNS-12 |
| 92 | Victor Campenaerts (BEL) | 111 |
| 93 | Thomas De Gendt (BEL) | 88 |
| 94 | Andreas Kron (DEN) | DNS-7 |
| 95 | Arjen Livyns (BEL) | 91 |
| 96 | Sylvain Moniquet (BEL) | 110 |
| 97 | Eduardo Sepúlveda (ARG) | 86 |
| 98 | Jonas Gregaard (DEN) | 77 |

(France) Groupama–FDJ (GFC)
| No. | Rider | Pos. |
|---|---|---|
| 101 | David Gaudu (FRA) | 6 |
| 102 | Sven Erik Bystrøm (NOR) | 117 |
| 103 | Kevin Geniets (LUX) | DNF-12 |
| 104 | Lorenzo Germani (ITA) | 97 |
| 105 | Stefan Küng (SUI) | 39 |
| 106 | Quentin Pacher (FRA) | 21 |
| 107 | Rémy Rochas (FRA) | DNF-16 |
| 108 | Reuben Thompson (NZL) | 94 |

(United States) EF Education–EasyPost (EFE)
| No. | Rider | Pos. |
|---|---|---|
| 111 | Richard Carapaz (ECU) | 4 |
| 112 | Rui Costa (POR) | DNF-5 |
| 113 | Owain Doull (GBR) | 118 |
| 114 | Darren Rafferty (IRL) | 75 |
| 115 | James Shaw (GBR) | 98 |
| 116 | Harry Sweeny (AUS) | 78 |
| 117 | Rigoberto Urán (COL) | DNF-6 |
| 118 | Jefferson Alexander Cepeda (ECU) | 46 |

(Spain) Movistar Team (MOV)
| No. | Rider | Pos. |
|---|---|---|
| 121 | Enric Mas (ESP) | 3 |
| 122 | Jorge Arcas (ESP) | 112 |
| 123 | Carlos Canal (ESP) | 70 |
| 124 | Oier Lazkano (ESP) | 92 |
| 125 | Nelson Oliveira (POR) | 73 |
| 126 | Nairo Quintana (COL) | 31 |
| 127 | Einer Rubio (COL) | 27 |
| 128 | Pelayo Sánchez (ESP) | DNF-15 |

Team Bahrain Victorious (TBV)
| No. | Rider | Pos. |
|---|---|---|
| 131 | Antonio Tiberi (ITA) | DNF-9 |
| 132 | Damiano Caruso (ITA) | DNS-7 |
| 133 | Kamil Gradek (POL) | 133 |
| 134 | Jack Haig (AUS) | 22 |
| 135 | Rainer Kepplinger (AUT) | DNF-9 |
| 136 | Fran Miholjević (CRO) | 87 |
| 137 | Jasha Sütterlin (GER) | 121 |
| 138 | Torstein Træen (NOR) | 60 |

(Australia) Team Jayco–AlUla (JAY)
| No. | Rider | Pos. |
|---|---|---|
| 141 | Eddie Dunbar (IRL) | 11 |
| 142 | Welay Berhe (ETH) | DNS-13 |
| 143 | Alessandro De Marchi (ITA) | 125 |
| 144 | Felix Engelhardt (GER) | 103 |
| 145 | Chris Harper (AUS) | DNF-11 |
| 146 | Mauro Schmid (SUI) | 71 |
| 147 | Callum Scotson (AUS) | DNS-16 |
| 148 | Filippo Zana (ITA) | 56 |

(France) Arkéa–B&B Hotels (ARK)
| No. | Rider | Pos. |
|---|---|---|
| 151 | Cristián Rodríguez (ESP) | 13 |
| 152 | Élie Gesbert (FRA) | DNS-8 |
| 153 | Thibault Guernalec (FRA) | 132 |
| 154 | Simon Guglielmi (FRA) | 47 |
| 155 | Laurens Huys (BEL) | 79 |
| 156 | Mathis Le Berre (FRA) | 76 |
| 157 | Łukasz Owsian (POL) | 89 |
| 158 | Michel Ries (LUX) | DNF-13 |

(Belgium) Intermarché–Wanty (IWA)
| No. | Rider | Pos. |
|---|---|---|
| 161 | Louis Meintjes (RSA) | 28 |
| 162 | Vito Braet (BEL) | 81 |
| 163 | Kobe Goossens (BEL) | DNS-10 |
| 164 | Arne Marit (BEL) | 122 |
| 165 | Tom Paquot (BEL) | DNS-16 |
| 166 | Simone Petilli (ITA) | 90 |
| 167 | Lorenzo Rota (ITA) | DNS-11 |
| 168 | Rein Taaramäe (EST) | DNF-18 |

(Netherlands) Team dsm–firmenich PostNL (DFP)
| No. | Rider | Pos. |
|---|---|---|
| 171 | Max Poole (GBR) | 35 |
| 172 | Pavel Bittner (CZE) | 115 |
| 173 | Chris Hamilton (AUS) | 68 |
| 174 | Gijs Leemreize (NED) | 84 |
| 175 | Enzo Leijnse (NED) | 129 |
| 176 | Tim Naberman (NED) | 135 |
| 177 | Martijn Tusveld (NED) | 63 |
| 178 | Julius van den Berg (NED) | 131 |

(France) Cofidis (COF)
| No. | Rider | Pos. |
|---|---|---|
| 181 | Guillaume Martin (FRA) | 15 |
| 182 | Thomas Champion (FRA) | 82 |
| 183 | Bryan Coquard (FRA) | DNF-8 |
| 184 | Rubén Fernández (ESP) | DNS-14 |
| 185 | Ion Izagirre (ESP) | 37 |
| 186 | Jesús Herrada (ESP) | 85 |
| 187 | Jonathan Lastra (ESP) | DNS-13 |
| 188 | Kenny Elissonde (FRA) | DNF-6 |

(Kazakhstan) Astana Qazaqstan Team (AST)
| No. | Rider | Pos. |
|---|---|---|
| 191 | Lorenzo Fortunato (ITA) | 16 |
| 192 | Gleb Brussenskiy (KAZ) | 124 |
| 193 | Gianmarco Garofoli (ITA) | 48 |
| 194 | Harold Martín López (ECU) | DNS-10 |
| 195 | Ide Schelling (NED) | 134 |
| 196 | Harold Tejada (COL) | 40 |
| 197 | Santiago Umba (COL) | 106 |
| 198 | Nicolas Vinokurov (KAZ) | 128 |

(Spain) Equipo Kern Pharma (EKP)
| No. | Rider | Pos. |
|---|---|---|
| 201 | Urko Berrade (ESP) | 42 |
| 202 | Pablo Castrillo (ESP) | 64 |
| 203 | Jorge Gutiérrez (ESP) | 99 |
| 204 | Unai Iribar (ESP) | 83 |
| 205 | Pau Miquel (ESP) | 58 |
| 206 | José Félix Parra (ESP) | 17 |
| 207 | Ibon Ruiz (ESP) | 101 |
| 208 | Antonio Jesús Soto (ESP) | 114 |

(Spain) Euskaltel–Euskadi (EUK)
| No. | Rider | Pos. |
|---|---|---|
| 211 | Txomin Juaristi (ESP) | DNF-20 |
| 212 | Jon Aberasturi (ESP) | DNF-6 |
| 213 | Xabier Berasategi (ESP) | 102 |
| 214 | Mikel Bizkarra (ESP) | 26 |
| 215 | Joan Bou (ESP) | 72 |
| 216 | Xabier Isasa (ESP) | 104 |
| 217 | Gotzon Martín (ESP) | 51 |
| 218 | Luis Ángel Maté (ESP) | 65 |

=== By nationality ===
| Country | No. of riders | Finished | Stage wins |
|---|---|---|---|
| Argentina | 1 | 1 | |
| Australia | 8 | 6 | 4 (Kaden Groves x3, Ben O'Connor) |
| Austria | 4 | 1 | |
| Belgium | 22 | 15 | 3 (Wout van Aert x3) |
| Canada | 1 | 0 | 1 (Michael Woods) |
| Colombia | 7 | 5 | |
| Croatia | 1 | 1 | |
| Czechia | 2 | 2 | 1 (Pavel Bittner) |
| Denmark | 5 | 4 | |
| Ecuador | 4 | 3 | |
| Estonia | 1 | 0 | |
| Ethiopia | 1 | 0 | |
| France | 17 | 13 | |
| Germany | 7 | 6 | |
| Great Britain | 7 | 6 | 1 (Adam Yates) |
| Hungary | 1 | 1 | |
| Ireland | 2 | 2 | 2 (Eddie Dunbar x2) |
| Israel | 1 | 1 | |
| Italy | 16 | 12 | |
| Kazakhstan | 2 | 2 | |
| Luxembourg | 2 | 0 | |
| Mexico | 1 | 1 | |
| Netherlands | 12 | 10 | |
| New Zealand | 3 | 2 | |
| Norway | 2 | 2 | |
| Poland | 2 | 2 | |
| Portugal | 3 | 1 | |
| Slovenia | 1 | 1 | 3 (Primož Roglič x3) |
| South Africa | 1 | 1 | |
| Spain | 32 | 27 | 4 (Urko Berrade, Pablo Castrillo x2, Marc Soler) |
| Switzerland | 2 | 2 | 1 (Stefan Küng) |
| United States | 4 | 4 | 1 (Brandon McNulty) |
| | 1 | 1 | |
| Total | 176 | 135 | 21 |
