= 2024 Vuelta a España, Stage 1 to Stage 11 =

Vuelta a España stages (cycling)

The 2024 Vuelta a España was a three-week cycling race that took place in Portugal and Spain between 17 August and 8 September. It was the 79th edition of the Vuelta a España and the third and final grand tour of the 2024 men's road cycling season. The race departed from Lisbon and finished in Madrid.

== Classification standings ==
Legend
Denotes the leader of the general classification	Denotes the leader of the young rider classification
Denotes the leader of the points classification	Denotes the leader of the team classification
Denotes the leader of the mountains classification	Denotes the winner of the combativity award

== Stage 1 ==
17 August 2024 – Lisbon (Portugal) to Oeiras (Portugal), 12 km (7.5 mi) (ITT)

Stage 1 Result
Rank	Rider	Team	Time
1	Brandon McNulty (USA)	UAE Team Emirates	12' 35"
2	Mathias Vacek (CZE)	Lidl–Trek	+ 2"
3	Wout van Aert (BEL)	Visma–Lease a Bike	+ 3"
4	Stefan Küng (SUI)	Groupama–FDJ	+ 6"
5	Edoardo Affini (ITA)	Visma–Lease a Bike	+ 8"
6	Joshua Tarling (GBR)	Ineos Grenadiers	+ 8"
7	Mauro Schmid (SUI)	Team Jayco–AlUla	+ 16"
8	Primož Roglič (SLO)	Red Bull–Bora–Hansgrohe	+ 17"
9	Bruno Armirail (FRA)	Decathlon–AG2R La Mondiale	+ 18"
10	João Almeida (POR)	UAE Team Emirates	+ 19"

General classification after Stage 1
Rank	Rider	Team	Time
1	Brandon McNulty (USA)	UAE Team Emirates	12' 35"
2	Mathias Vacek (CZE)	Lidl–Trek	+ 2"
3	Wout van Aert (BEL)	Visma–Lease a Bike	+ 3"
4	Stefan Küng (SUI)	Groupama–FDJ	+ 6"
5	Edoardo Affini (ITA)	Visma–Lease a Bike	+ 8"
6	Joshua Tarling (GBR)	Ineos Grenadiers	+ 8"
7	Mauro Schmid (SUI)	Team Jayco–AlUla	+ 16"
8	Primož Roglič (SLO)	Red Bull–Bora–Hansgrohe	+ 17"
9	Bruno Armirail (FRA)	Decathlon–AG2R La Mondiale	+ 18"
10	João Almeida (POR)	UAE Team Emirates	+ 19"

== Stage 2 ==
18 August 2024 – Cascais (Portugal) to Ourém (Portugal), 194 km (121 mi)

Stage 2 Result
Rank	Rider	Team	Time
1	Kaden Groves (AUS)	Alpecin–Deceuninck	5h 12' 55"
2	Wout van Aert (BEL)	Visma–Lease a Bike	+ 0"
3	Corbin Strong (NZL)	Israel–Premier Tech	+ 0"
4	Pau Miquel (ESP)	Equipo Kern Pharma	+ 0"
5	Lennert Van Eetvelt (BEL)	Lotto–Dstny	+ 0"
6	Pavel Bittner (CZE)	Team DSM–Firmenich PostNL	+ 0"
7	Jon Aberasturi (ESP)	Euskaltel–Euskadi	+ 0"
8	Aleksandr Vlasov	Red Bull–Bora–Hansgrohe	+ 0"
9	Brandon Rivera (COL)	Ineos Grenadiers	+ 0"
10	Filippo Baroncini (ITA)	UAE Team Emirates	+ 0"

General classification after Stage 2
Rank	Rider	Team	Time
1	Wout van Aert (BEL)	Visma–Lease a Bike	5h 25' 27"
2	Brandon McNulty (USA)	UAE Team Emirates	+ 3"
3	Mathias Vacek (CZE)	Lidl–Trek	+ 5"
4	Stefan Küng (SUI)	Groupama–FDJ	+ 9"
5	Edoardo Affini (ITA)	Visma–Lease a Bike	+ 11"
6	Joshua Tarling (GBR)	Ineos Grenadiers	+ 11"
7	Mauro Schmid (SUI)	Team Jayco–AlUla	+ 19"
8	Primož Roglič (SLO)	Red Bull–Bora–Hansgrohe	+ 20"
9	Bruno Armirail (FRA)	Decathlon–AG2R La Mondiale	+ 21"
10	João Almeida (POR)	UAE Team Emirates	+ 22"

== Stage 3 ==
19 August 2024 – Lousã (Portugal) to Castelo Branco (Portugal), 191.2 km (118.8 mi)

Stage 3 Result
Rank	Rider	Team	Time
1	Wout van Aert (BEL)	Visma–Lease a Bike	4h 40' 42"
2	Kaden Groves (AUS)	Alpecin–Deceuninck	+ 0"
3	Jon Aberasturi (ESP)	Euskaltel–Euskadi	+ 0"
4	Arne Marit (BEL)	Intermarché–Wanty	+ 0"
5	Pavel Bittner (CZE)	Team DSM–Firmenich PostNL	+ 0"
6	Corbin Strong (NZL)	Israel–Premier Tech	+ 0"
7	Arjen Livyns (BEL)	Lotto–Dstny	+ 0"
8	Bryan Coquard (FRA)	Cofidis	+ 0"
9	Antonio Jesús Soto (ESP)	Equipo Kern Pharma	+ 0"
10	Carlos Canal (ESP)	Movistar Team	+ 0"

General classification after Stage 3
Rank	Rider	Team	Time
1	Wout van Aert (BEL)	Visma–Lease a Bike	10h 05' 59"
2	Brandon McNulty (USA)	UAE Team Emirates	+ 13"
3	Mathias Vacek (CZE)	Lidl–Trek	+ 15"
4	Stefan Küng (SUI)	Groupama–FDJ	+ 19"
5	Edoardo Affini (ITA)	Visma–Lease a Bike	+ 21"
6	Mauro Schmid (SUI)	Team Jayco–AlUla	+ 29"
7	Primož Roglič (SLO)	Red Bull–Bora–Hansgrohe	+ 30"
8	Bruno Armirail (FRA)	Decathlon–AG2R La Mondiale	+ 31"
9	João Almeida (POR)	UAE Team Emirates	+ 32"
10	Nelson Oliveira (POR)	Movistar Team	+ 33"

== Stage 4 ==
20 August 2024 – Plasencia to Pico Villuercas, 170.5 km (105.9 mi)

Stage 4 Result
Rank	Rider	Team	Time
1	Primož Roglič (SLO)	Red Bull–Bora–Hansgrohe	4h 26' 49"
2	Lennert Van Eetvelt (BEL)	Lotto–Dstny	+ 0"
3	João Almeida (POR)	UAE Team Emirates	+ 0"
4	Enric Mas (ESP)	Movistar Team	+ 0"
5	Felix Gall (AUT)	Decathlon–AG2R La Mondiale	+ 0"
6	Matthew Riccitello (USA)	Israel–Premier Tech	+ 0"
7	Mikel Landa (ESP)	Soudal–Quick-Step	+ 0"
8	Antonio Tiberi (ITA)	Team Bahrain Victorious	+ 18"
9	George Bennett (NZL)	Israel–Premier Tech	+ 28"
10	Pavel Sivakov (FRA)	UAE Team Emirates	+ 28"

General classification after Stage 4
Rank	Rider	Team	Time
1	Primož Roglič (SLO)	Red Bull–Bora–Hansgrohe	14h 33' 08"
2	João Almeida (POR)	UAE Team Emirates	+ 8"
3	Enric Mas (ESP)	Movistar Team	+ 32"
4	Antonio Tiberi (ITA)	Team Bahrain Victorious	+ 38"
5	Lennert Van Eetvelt (BEL)	Lotto–Dstny	+ 41"
6	Felix Gall (AUT)	Decathlon–AG2R La Mondiale	+ 47"
7	Brandon McNulty (USA)	UAE Team Emirates	+ 50"
8	Mattias Skjelmose (DEN)	Lidl–Trek	+ 58"
9	Mikel Landa (ESP)	Soudal–Quick-Step	+ 58"
10	Aleksandr Vlasov	Red Bull–Bora–Hansgrohe	+ 1' 00"

== Stage 5 ==
21 August 2024 – Fuente del Maestre to Sevilla, 177 km (110 mi)

Stage 5 Result
Rank	Rider	Team	Time
1	Pavel Bittner (CZE)	Team DSM–Firmenich PostNL	4h 25' 28"
2	Wout van Aert (BEL)	Visma–Lease a Bike	+ 0"
3	Kaden Groves (AUS)	Alpecin–Deceuninck	+ 0"
4	Bryan Coquard (FRA)	Cofidis	+ 0"
5	Stefan Küng (SUI)	Groupama–FDJ	+ 0"
6	Corbin Strong (NZL)	Israel–Premier Tech	+ 0"
7	Jhonatan Narváez (COL)	Ineos Grenadiers	+ 0"
8	Arne Marit (BEL)	Intermarché–Wanty	+ 0"
9	Gianmarco Garofoli (ITA)	Astana Qazaqstan Team	+ 0"
10	Antonio Jesús Soto (ESP)	Equipo Kern Pharma	+ 0"

General classification after Stage 5
Rank	Rider	Team	Time
1	Primož Roglič (SLO)	Red Bull–Bora–Hansgrohe	18h 58' 36"
2	João Almeida (POR)	UAE Team Emirates	+ 8"
3	Enric Mas (ESP)	Movistar Team	+ 32"
4	Antonio Tiberi (ITA)	Team Bahrain Victorious	+ 38"
5	Lennert Van Eetvelt (BEL)	Lotto–Dstny	+ 41"
6	Felix Gall (AUT)	Decathlon–AG2R La Mondiale	+ 47"
7	Brandon McNulty (USA)	UAE Team Emirates	+ 50"
8	Mattias Skjelmose (DEN)	Lidl–Trek	+ 58"
9	Mikel Landa (ESP)	Soudal–Quick-Step	+ 58"
10	Aleksandr Vlasov	Red Bull–Bora–Hansgrohe	+ 1' 00"

== Stage 6 ==
22 August 2024 – Jerez de la Frontera to Yunquera, 185.5 km (115.3 mi)

Stage 6 Result
Rank	Rider	Team	Time
1	Ben O'Connor (AUS)	Decathlon–AG2R La Mondiale	4h 28' 12"
2	Marco Frigo (ITA)	Israel–Premier Tech	+ 4' 33"
3	Florian Lipowitz (GER)	Red Bull–Bora–Hansgrohe	+ 5' 12"
4	Clément Berthet (FRA)	Decathlon–AG2R La Mondiale	+ 5' 12"
5	Cristián Rodríguez (ESP)	Arkéa–B&B Hotels	+ 5' 12"
6	Gijs Leemreize (NED)	Team DSM–Firmenich PostNL	+ 5' 12"
7	Mauri Vansevenant (BEL)	Soudal–Quick-Step	+ 5' 35"
8	Urko Berrade (ESP)	Equipo Kern Pharma	+ 6' 02"
9	Isaac del Toro (MEX)	UAE Team Emirates	+ 6' 31"
10	David Gaudu (FRA)	Groupama–FDJ	+ 6' 31"

General classification after Stage 6
Rank	Rider	Team	Time
1	Ben O'Connor (AUS)	Decathlon–AG2R La Mondiale	23h 28' 28"
2	Primož Roglič (SLO)	Red Bull–Bora–Hansgrohe	+ 4' 51"
3	João Almeida (POR)	UAE Team Emirates	+ 4' 59"
4	Florian Lipowitz (GER)	Red Bull–Bora–Hansgrohe	+ 5' 18"
5	Enric Mas (ESP)	Movistar Team	+ 5' 23"
6	Cristián Rodríguez (ESP)	Arkéa–B&B Hotels	+ 5' 26"
7	Antonio Tiberi (ITA)	Team Bahrain Victorious	+ 5' 29"
8	Lennert Van Eetvelt (BEL)	Lotto–Dstny	+ 5' 32"
9	Felix Gall (AUT)	Decathlon–AG2R La Mondiale	+ 5' 38"
10	Mattias Skjelmose (DEN)	Lidl–Trek	+ 5' 49"

== Stage 7 ==
23 August 2024 – Archidona to Córdoba, 180.5 km (112.2 mi)

Stage 7 Result
Rank	Rider	Team	Time
1	Wout van Aert (BEL)	Visma–Lease a Bike	4h 15' 49"
2	Mathias Vacek (CZE)	Lidl–Trek	+ 0"
3	Pau Miquel (ESP)	Equipo Kern Pharma	+ 0"
4	Stefan Küng (SUI)	Groupama–FDJ	+ 0"
5	Quinten Hermans (BEL)	Alpecin–Deceuninck	+ 0"
6	Quentin Pacher (FRA)	Groupama–FDJ	+ 0"
7	Lorenzo Rota (ITA)	Intermarché–Wanty	+ 0"
8	Harold Tejada (COL)	Astana Qazaqstan Team	+ 0"
9	Max Poole (GBR)	Team DSM–Firmenich PostNL	+ 0"
10	George Bennett (NZL)	Israel–Premier Tech	+ 0"

General classification after Stage 7
Rank	Rider	Team	Time
1	Ben O'Connor (AUS)	Decathlon–AG2R La Mondiale	27h 44' 07"
2	Primož Roglič (SLO)	Red Bull–Bora–Hansgrohe	+ 4' 45"
3	João Almeida (POR)	UAE Team Emirates	+ 4' 59"
4	Enric Mas (ESP)	Movistar Team	+ 5' 23"
5	Cristián Rodríguez (ESP)	Arkéa–B&B Hotels	+ 5' 26"
6	Antonio Tiberi (ITA)	Team Bahrain Victorious	+ 5' 29"
7	Lennert Van Eetvelt (BEL)	Lotto–Dstny	+ 5' 32"
8	Florian Lipowitz (GER)	Red Bull–Bora–Hansgrohe	+ 5' 37"
9	Felix Gall (AUT)	Decathlon–AG2R La Mondiale	+ 5' 38"
10	Mattias Skjelmose (DEN)	Lidl–Trek	+ 5' 49"

== Stage 8 ==
24 August 2024 – Úbeda to Cazorla, 159 km (99 mi)

Stage 8 Result
Rank	Rider	Team	Time
1	Primož Roglič (SLO)	Red Bull–Bora–Hansgrohe	3h 38' 34"
2	Enric Mas (ESP)	Movistar Team	+ 0"
3	Mikel Landa (ESP)	Soudal–Quick-Step	+ 14"
4	Antonio Tiberi (ITA)	Team Bahrain Victorious	+ 17"
5	Mattias Skjelmose (DEN)	Lidl–Trek	+ 21"
6	Carlos Rodríguez (ESP)	Ineos Grenadiers	+ 21"
7	Harold Tejada (COL)	Astana Qazaqstan Team	+ 24"
8	Eddie Dunbar (IRL)	Team Jayco–AlUla	+ 26"
9	Lennert Van Eetvelt (BEL)	Lotto–Dstny	+ 29"
10	Jack Haig (AUS)	Team Bahrain Victorious	+ 29"

General classification after Stage 8
Rank	Rider	Team	Time
1	Ben O'Connor (AUS)	Decathlon–AG2R La Mondiale	31h 23' 27"
2	Primož Roglič (SLO)	Red Bull–Bora–Hansgrohe	+ 3' 49"
3	Enric Mas (ESP)	Movistar Team	+ 4' 31"
4	Antonio Tiberi (ITA)	Team Bahrain Victorious	+ 5' 00"
5	Mikel Landa (ESP)	Soudal–Quick-Step	+ 5' 13"
6	Lennert Van Eetvelt (BEL)	Lotto–Dstny	+ 5' 15"
7	Cristián Rodríguez (ESP)	Arkéa–B&B Hotels	+ 5' 19"
8	Mattias Skjelmose (DEN)	Lidl–Trek	+ 5' 24"
9	Florian Lipowitz (GER)	Red Bull–Bora–Hansgrohe	+ 5' 25"
10	Felix Gall (AUT)	Decathlon–AG2R La Mondiale	+ 5' 26"

== Stage 9 ==
25 August 2024 – Motril to Granada, 178.5 km (110.9 mi)

Stage 9 Result
Rank	Rider	Team	Time
1	Adam Yates (GBR)	UAE Team Emirates	4h 42' 28"
2	Richard Carapaz (ECU)	EF Education–EasyPost	+ 1' 39"
3	Ben O'Connor (AUS)	Decathlon–AG2R La Mondiale	+ 3' 45"
4	Mikel Landa (ESP)	Soudal–Quick-Step	+ 3' 45"
5	Florian Lipowitz (GER)	Red Bull–Bora–Hansgrohe	+ 3' 45"
6	Pavel Sivakov (FRA)	UAE Team Emirates	+ 3' 45"
7	Carlos Rodríguez (ESP)	Ineos Grenadiers	+ 3' 45"
8	Primož Roglič (SLO)	Red Bull–Bora–Hansgrohe	+ 3' 45"
9	David Gaudu (FRA)	Groupama–FDJ	+ 3' 45"
10	Enric Mas (ESP)	Movistar Team	+ 3' 45"

General classification after Stage 9
Rank	Rider	Team	Time
1	Ben O'Connor (AUS)	Decathlon–AG2R La Mondiale	36h 09' 36"
2	Primož Roglič (SLO)	Red Bull–Bora–Hansgrohe	+ 3' 53"
3	Richard Carapaz (ECU)	EF Education–EasyPost	+ 4' 32"
4	Enric Mas (ESP)	Movistar Team	+ 4' 35"
5	Mikel Landa (ESP)	Soudal–Quick-Step	+ 5' 17"
6	Florian Lipowitz (GER)	Red Bull–Bora–Hansgrohe	+ 5' 29"
7	Adam Yates (GBR)	UAE Team Emirates	+ 5' 30"
8	Felix Gall (AUT)	Decathlon–AG2R La Mondiale	+ 5' 30"
9	Carlos Rodríguez (ESP)	Ineos Grenadiers	+ 6' 00"
10	David Gaudu (FRA)	Groupama–FDJ	+ 6' 32"

== Rest day 1 ==
26 August 2024 – Vigo

== Stage 10 ==
27 August 2024 – Ponteareas to Baiona, 160 km (99 mi)

Stage 10 Result
Rank	Rider	Team	Time
1	Wout van Aert (BEL)	Visma–Lease a Bike	3h 50' 47"
2	Quentin Pacher (FRA)	Groupama–FDJ	+ 3"
3	Marc Soler (ESP)	UAE Team Emirates	+ 2' 01"
4	William Junior Lecerf (BEL)	Soudal–Quick-Step	+ 2' 01"
5	Juri Hollmann (GER)	Alpecin–Deceuninck	+ 2' 01"
6	Txomin Juaristi (ESP)	Euskaltel–Euskadi	+ 5' 13"
7	Jhonatan Narváez (ECU)	Ineos Grenadiers	+ 5' 31"
8	Stefan Küng (SUI)	Groupama–FDJ	+ 5' 31"
9	George Bennett (NZL)	Israel–Premier Tech	+ 5' 31"
10	Harold Tejada (COL)	Astana Qazaqstan Team	+ 5' 31"

General classification after Stage 10
Rank	Rider	Team	Time
1	Ben O'Connor (AUS)	Decathlon–AG2R La Mondiale	40h 05' 54"
2	Primož Roglič (SLO)	Red Bull–Bora–Hansgrohe	+ 3' 53"
3	Richard Carapaz (ECU)	EF Education–EasyPost	+ 4' 32"
4	Enric Mas (ESP)	Movistar Team	+ 4' 35"
5	Mikel Landa (ESP)	Soudal–Quick-Step	+ 5' 17"
6	Florian Lipowitz (GER)	Red Bull–Bora–Hansgrohe	+ 5' 29"
7	Adam Yates (GBR)	UAE Team Emirates	+ 5' 30"
8	Felix Gall (AUT)	Decathlon–AG2R La Mondiale	+ 5' 30"
9	Carlos Rodríguez (ESP)	Ineos Grenadiers	+ 6' 00"
10	David Gaudu (FRA)	Groupama–FDJ	+ 6' 32"

== Stage 11 ==
28 August 2024 – Padrón to Padrón, 166.5 km (103.5 mi)

Stage 11 Result
Rank	Rider	Team	Time
1	Eddie Dunbar (IRL)	Team Jayco–AlUla	3h 44' 52"
2	Quinten Hermans (BEL)	Alpecin–Deceuninck	+ 2"
3	Max Poole (GBR)	Team DSM–Firmenich PostNL	+ 2"
4	Jhonatan Narváez (ECU)	Ineos Grenadiers	+ 4"
5	Urko Berrade (ESP)	Equipo Kern Pharma	+ 4"
6	Filippo Zana (ITA)	Team Jayco–AlUla	+ 4"
7	Ion Izagirre (ESP)	Cofidis	+ 4"
8	Carlos Verona (ESP)	Lidl–Trek	+ 4"
9	Gianmarco Garofoli (ITA)	Astana Qazaqstan Team	+ 4"
10	Brandon McNulty (USA)	UAE Team Emirates	+ 4"

General classification after Stage 11
Rank	Rider	Team	Time
1	Ben O'Connor (AUS)	Decathlon–AG2R La Mondiale	43h 54' 54"
2	Primož Roglič (SLO)	Red Bull–Bora–Hansgrohe	+ 3' 16"
3	Enric Mas (ESP)	Movistar Team	+ 3' 58"
4	Richard Carapaz (ECU)	EF Education–EasyPost	+ 4' 10"
5	Mikel Landa (ESP)	Soudal–Quick-Step	+ 4' 40"
6	Carlos Rodríguez (ESP)	Ineos Grenadiers	+ 5' 23"
7	Florian Lipowitz (GER)	Red Bull–Bora–Hansgrohe	+ 5' 29"
8	Adam Yates (GBR)	UAE Team Emirates	+ 5' 30"
9	Felix Gall (AUT)	Decathlon–AG2R La Mondiale	+ 5' 30"
10	George Bennett (NZL)	Israel–Premier Tech	+ 5' 46"
