= 2024 Vuelta a España, Stage 12 to Stage 21 =

Vuelta a España stages (cycling)

The 2024 Vuelta a España was a three-week cycling race that took place in Portugal and Spain between 17 August and 8 September. It was the 79th edition of the Vuelta a España and the third and final grand tour of the 2024 men's road cycling season. The race departed from Lisbon and finished in Madrid.

== Classification standings ==
Legend
Denotes the leader of the general classification	Denotes the leader of the young rider classification
Denotes the leader of the points classification	Denotes the leader of the team classification
Denotes the leader of the mountains classification	Denotes the winner of the combativity award

== Stage 12 ==
29 August 2024 – Orense to Estación de Montaña de Manzaneda, 137.5 km (85.4 mi)

Stage 12 Result
Rank	Rider	Team	Time
1	Pablo Castrillo (ESP)	Equipo Kern Pharma	3h 36' 12"
2	Max Poole (GBR)	Team dsm–firmenich PostNL	+ 8"
3	Marc Soler (ESP)	UAE Team Emirates	+ 16"
4	Mauro Schmid (SUI)	Team Jayco–AlUla	+ 23"
5	Jhonatan Narváez (ECU)	Ineos Grenadiers	+ 34"
6	Mauri Vansevenant (BEL)	Soudal–Quick-Step	+ 40"
7	Harold Tejada (COL)	Astana Qazaqstan Team	+ 49"
8	Carlos Verona (ESP)	Lidl–Trek	+ 1' 03"
9	Louis Meintjes (RSA)	Intermarché–Wanty	+ 1' 14"
10	Óscar Rodríguez (ESP)	Ineos Grenadiers	+ 1' 52"

General classification after Stage 12
Rank	Rider	Team	Time
1	Ben O'Connor (AUS)	Decathlon–AG2R La Mondiale	47h 37' 35"
2	Primož Roglič (SLO)	Red Bull–Bora–Hansgrohe	+ 3' 16"
3	Enric Mas (ESP)	Movistar Team	+ 3' 58"
4	Richard Carapaz (ECU)	EF Education–EasyPost	+ 4' 10"
5	Mikel Landa (ESP)	Soudal–Quick-Step	+ 4' 40"
6	Carlos Rodríguez (ESP)	Ineos Grenadiers	+ 5' 23"
7	Florian Lipowitz (GER)	Red Bull–Bora–Hansgrohe	+ 5' 29"
8	Adam Yates (GBR)	UAE Team Emirates	+ 5' 30"
9	Felix Gall (AUT)	Decathlon–AG2R La Mondiale	+ 5' 30"
10	George Bennett (NZL)	Israel–Premier Tech	+ 5' 46"

== Stage 13 ==
30 August 2024 – Lugo to Puerto de Ancares, 176 km (109 mi)

Stage 13 Result
Rank	Rider	Team	Time
1	Michael Woods (CAN)	Israel–Premier Tech	4h 19' 51"
2	Mauro Schmid (SUI)	Team Jayco–AlUla	+ 45"
3	Marc Soler (ESP)	UAE Team Emirates	+ 1' 11"
4	Sam Oomen (NED)	Lidl–Trek	+ 1' 25"
5	Wout van Aert (BEL)	Visma–Lease a Bike	+ 2' 56"
6	Gijs Leemreize (NED)	Team dsm–firmenich PostNL	+ 3' 33"
7	José Félix Parra (ESP)	Equipo Kern Pharma	+ 5' 19"
8	Mikel Bizkarra (ESP)	Euskaltel–Euskadi	+ 5' 38"
9	Luca Vergallito (ITA)	Alpecin–Deceuninck	+ 5' 59"
10	Mathis Le Berre (FRA)	Arkéa–B&B Hotels	+ 6' 15"

General classification after Stage 13
Rank	Rider	Team	Time
1	Ben O'Connor (AUS)	Decathlon–AG2R La Mondiale	52h 10' 15"
2	Primož Roglič (SLO)	Red Bull–Bora–Hansgrohe	+ 1' 21"
3	Enric Mas (ESP)	Movistar Team	+ 3' 01"
4	Richard Carapaz (ECU)	EF Education–EasyPost	+ 3' 13"
5	Mikel Landa (ESP)	Soudal–Quick-Step	+ 3' 20"
6	Carlos Rodríguez (ESP)	Ineos Grenadiers	+ 4' 12"
7	Florian Lipowitz (GER)	Red Bull–Bora–Hansgrohe	+ 4' 29"
8	Felix Gall (AUT)	Decathlon–AG2R La Mondiale	+ 4' 42"
9	David Gaudu (FRA)	Groupama–FDJ	+ 4' 44"
10	Adam Yates (GBR)	UAE Team Emirates	+ 5' 17"

== Stage 14 ==
31 August 2024 – Villafranca del Bierzo to Villablino, 200.5 km (124.6 mi)

Stage 14 Result
Rank	Rider	Team	Time
1	Kaden Groves (AUS)	Alpecin–Deceuninck	4h 21' 34"
2	Wout van Aert (BEL)	Visma–Lease a Bike	+ 0"
3	Corbin Strong (NZL)	Israel–Premier Tech	+ 0"
4	Mathias Vacek (CZE)	Lidl–Trek	+ 0"
5	Pau Miquel (ESP)	Equipo Kern Pharma	+ 0"
6	Filippo Baroncini (ITA)	UAE Team Emirates	+ 0"
7	Simon Guglielmi (FRA)	Arkéa–B&B Hotels	+ 0"
8	Arjen Livyns (BEL)	Lotto–Dstny	+ 0"
9	Xabier Berasategi (ESP)	Euskaltel–Euskadi	+ 0"
10	Carlos Canal (ESP)	Movistar Team	+ 0"

General classification after Stage 14
Rank	Rider	Team	Time
1	Ben O'Connor (AUS)	Decathlon–AG2R La Mondiale	56h 31' 49"
2	Primož Roglič (SLO)	Red Bull–Bora–Hansgrohe	+ 1' 21"
3	Enric Mas (ESP)	Movistar Team	+ 3' 01"
4	Richard Carapaz (ECU)	EF Education–EasyPost	+ 3' 13"
5	Mikel Landa (ESP)	Soudal–Quick-Step	+ 3' 20"
6	Carlos Rodríguez (ESP)	Ineos Grenadiers	+ 4' 12"
7	Florian Lipowitz (GER)	Red Bull–Bora–Hansgrohe	+ 4' 29"
8	Felix Gall (AUT)	Decathlon–AG2R La Mondiale	+ 4' 42"
9	David Gaudu (FRA)	Groupama–FDJ	+ 4' 44"
10	Adam Yates (GBR)	UAE Team Emirates	+ 5' 17"

== Stage 15 ==
1 September 2024 – Infiesto to Valgrande-Pajares, 143 km (89 mi)

Stage 15 Result
Rank	Rider	Team	Time
1	Pablo Castrillo (ESP)	Equipo Kern Pharma	3h 45' 51"
2	Aleksandr Vlasov	Red Bull–Bora–Hansgrohe	+ 12"
3	Pavel Sivakov (FRA)	UAE Team Emirates	+ 31"
4	Enric Mas (ESP)	Movistar Team	+ 1' 04"
5	Primož Roglič (SLO)	Red Bull–Bora–Hansgrohe	+ 1' 04"
6	Mattias Skjelmose (DEN)	Lidl–Trek	+ 1' 09"
7	Richard Carapaz (ECU)	EF Education–EasyPost	+ 1' 13"
8	Sepp Kuss (USA)	Visma–Lease a Bike	+ 1' 22"
9	Mikel Landa (ESP)	Soudal–Quick-Step	+ 1' 27"
10	David Gaudu (FRA)	Groupama–FDJ	+ 1' 37"

General classification after Stage 15
Rank	Rider	Team	Time
1	Ben O'Connor (AUS)	Decathlon–AG2R La Mondiale	60h 19' 22"
2	Primož Roglič (SLO)	Red Bull–Bora–Hansgrohe	+ 1' 03"
3	Enric Mas (ESP)	Movistar Team	+ 2' 23"
4	Richard Carapaz (ECU)	EF Education–EasyPost	+ 2' 44"
5	Mikel Landa (ESP)	Soudal–Quick-Step	+ 3' 05"
6	Florian Lipowitz (GER)	Red Bull–Bora–Hansgrohe	+ 4' 33"
7	David Gaudu (FRA)	Groupama–FDJ	+ 4' 39"
8	Carlos Rodríguez (ESP)	Ineos Grenadiers	+ 4' 40"
9	Mattias Skjelmose (DEN)	Lidl–Trek	+ 4' 51"
10	Pavel Sivakov (FRA)	UAE Team Emirates	+ 5' 12"

== Rest day 2 ==
2 September 2024 – Oviedo

== Stage 16 ==
3 September 2024 – Luanco to Lagos de Covadonga, 181.5 km (112.8 mi)

Stage 16 Result
Rank	Rider	Team	Time
1	Marc Soler (ESP)	UAE Team Emirates	4h 44' 46"
2	Filippo Zana (ITA)	Team Jayco–AlUla	+ 18"
3	Max Poole (GBR)	Team dsm–firmenich PostNL	+ 23"
4	Jay Vine (AUS)	UAE Team Emirates	+ 57"
5	Ion Izagirre (ESP)	Cofidis	+ 1' 02"
6	Isaac del Toro (MEX)	UAE Team Emirates	+ 1' 29"
7	Marco Frigo (ITA)	Israel–Premier Tech	+ 1' 35"
8	Matthew Riccitello (USA)	Israel–Premier Tech	+ 1' 47"
9	Enric Mas (ESP)	Movistar Team	+ 3' 54"
10	Richard Carapaz (ECU)	EF Education–EasyPost	+ 3' 54"

General classification after Stage 16
Rank	Rider	Team	Time
1	Ben O'Connor (AUS)	Decathlon–AG2R La Mondiale	65h 09' 00"
2	Primož Roglič (SLO)	Red Bull–Bora–Hansgrohe	+ 5"
3	Enric Mas (ESP)	Movistar Team	+ 1' 25"
4	Richard Carapaz (ECU)	EF Education–EasyPost	+ 1' 46"
5	Mikel Landa (ESP)	Soudal–Quick-Step	+ 2' 18"
6	David Gaudu (FRA)	Groupama–FDJ	+ 3' 48"
7	Carlos Rodríguez (ESP)	Ineos Grenadiers	+ 3' 53"
8	Mattias Skjelmose (DEN)	Lidl–Trek	+ 4' 00"
9	Florian Lipowitz (GER)	Red Bull–Bora–Hansgrohe	+ 4' 27"
10	Pavel Sivakov (FRA)	UAE Team Emirates	+ 5' 19"

== Stage 17 ==
4 September 2024 – Arnuero to Santander, 141.5 km (87.9 mi)

Stage 17 Result
Rank	Rider	Team	Time
1	Kaden Groves (AUS)	Alpecin–Deceuninck	3h 32' 14"
2	Pavel Bittner (CZE)	Team dsm–firmenich PostNL	+ 0"
3	Vito Braet (BEL)	Intermarché–Wanty	+ 0"
4	Pau Miquel (ESP)	Equipo Kern Pharma	+ 0"
5	Corbin Strong (NZL)	Israel–Premier Tech	+ 0"
6	Victor Campenaerts (BEL)	Lotto–Dstny	+ 0"
7	Edward Planckaert (BEL)	Alpecin–Deceuninck	+ 0"
8	Mathis Le Berre (FRA)	Arkéa–B&B Hotels	+ 0"
9	Arjen Livyns (BEL)	Lotto–Dstny	+ 0"
10	Xabier Berasategi (ESP)	Euskaltel–Euskadi	+ 0"

General classification after Stage 17
Rank	Rider	Team	Time
1	Ben O'Connor (AUS)	Decathlon–AG2R La Mondiale	68h 41' 14"
2	Primož Roglič (SLO)	Red Bull–Bora–Hansgrohe	+ 5"
3	Enric Mas (ESP)	Movistar Team	+ 1' 25"
4	Richard Carapaz (ECU)	EF Education–EasyPost	+ 1' 46"
5	Mikel Landa (ESP)	Soudal–Quick-Step	+ 2' 18"
6	David Gaudu (FRA)	Groupama–FDJ	+ 3' 48"
7	Carlos Rodríguez (ESP)	Ineos Grenadiers	+ 3' 53"
8	Mattias Skjelmose (DEN)	Lidl–Trek	+ 4' 00"
9	Florian Lipowitz (GER)	Red Bull–Bora–Hansgrohe	+ 4' 27"
10	Pavel Sivakov (FRA)	UAE Team Emirates	+ 5' 19"

== Stage 18 ==
5 September 2024 – Vitoria-Gasteiz to Maeztu, 179.5 km (111.5 mi)

Stage 18 Result
Rank	Rider	Team	Time
1	Urko Berrade (ESP)	Equipo Kern Pharma	4h 00' 52"
2	Mauro Schmid (SUI)	Team Jayco–AlUla	+ 4"
3	Max Poole (GBR)	Team dsm–firmenich PostNL	+ 4"
4	Aleksandr Vlasov	Red Bull–Bora–Hansgrohe	+ 4"
5	Oier Lazkano (ESP)	Movistar Team	+ 4"
6	Ion Izagirre (ESP)	Cofidis	+ 4"
7	Mathias Vacek (CZE)	Lidl–Trek	+ 4"
8	Pablo Castrillo (ESP)	Equipo Kern Pharma	+ 4"
9	Pau Miquel (ESP)	Equipo Kern Pharma	+ 4"
10	Steven Kruijswijk (NED)	Visma–Lease a Bike	+ 11"

General classification after Stage 18
Rank	Rider	Team	Time
1	Ben O'Connor (AUS)	Decathlon–AG2R La Mondiale	72h 48' 46"
2	Primož Roglič (SLO)	Red Bull–Bora–Hansgrohe	+ 5"
3	Enric Mas (ESP)	Movistar Team	+ 1' 25"
4	Richard Carapaz (ECU)	EF Education–EasyPost	+ 1' 46"
5	David Gaudu (FRA)	Groupama–FDJ	+ 3' 48"
6	Carlos Rodríguez (ESP)	Ineos Grenadiers	+ 3' 53"
7	Mattias Skjelmose (DEN)	Lidl–Trek	+ 4' 00"
8	Florian Lipowitz (GER)	Red Bull–Bora–Hansgrohe	+ 4' 27"
9	Pavel Sivakov (FRA)	UAE Team Emirates	+ 5' 19"
10	Mikel Landa (ESP)	Soudal–Quick-Step	+ 5' 38"

== Stage 19 ==
6 September 2024 – Logroño to Alto de Moncalvillo, 173.5 km (107.8 mi)

Stage 19 Result
Rank	Rider	Team	Time
1	Primož Roglič (SLO)	Red Bull–Bora–Hansgrohe	3h 54' 55"
2	David Gaudu (FRA)	Groupama–FDJ	+ 46"
3	Mattias Skjelmose (DEN)	Lidl–Trek	+ 46"
4	Enric Mas (ESP)	Movistar Team	+ 50"
5	Mikel Landa (ESP)	Soudal–Quick-Step	+ 57"
6	Carlos Rodríguez (ESP)	Ineos Grenadiers	+ 57"
7	Eddie Dunbar (IRL)	Team Jayco–AlUla	+ 1' 01"
8	Sepp Kuss (USA)	Visma–Lease a Bike	+ 1' 01"
9	Richard Carapaz (ECU)	EF Education–EasyPost	+ 1' 03"
10	Florian Lipowitz (GER)	Red Bull–Bora–Hansgrohe	+ 1' 23"

General classification after Stage 19
Rank	Rider	Team	Time
1	Primož Roglič (SLO)	Red Bull–Bora–Hansgrohe	76h 43' 36"
2	Ben O'Connor (AUS)	Decathlon–AG2R La Mondiale	+ 1' 54"
3	Enric Mas (ESP)	Movistar Team	+ 2' 20"
4	Richard Carapaz (ECU)	EF Education–EasyPost	+ 2' 54"
5	David Gaudu (FRA)	Groupama–FDJ	+ 4' 33"
6	Mattias Skjelmose (DEN)	Lidl–Trek	+ 4' 47"
7	Carlos Rodríguez (ESP)	Ineos Grenadiers	+ 4' 55"
8	Florian Lipowitz (GER)	Red Bull–Bora–Hansgrohe	+ 5' 55"
9	Mikel Landa (ESP)	Soudal–Quick-Step	+ 6' 40"
10	Pavel Sivakov (FRA)	UAE Team Emirates	+ 7' 39"

== Stage 20 ==
7 September 2024 – Villarcayo to Picón Blanco, 172 km (107 mi)

Stage 20 Result
Rank	Rider	Team	Time
1	Eddie Dunbar (IRL)	Team Jayco–AlUla	4h 38' 37"
2	Enric Mas (ESP)	Movistar Team	+ 7"
3	Primož Roglič (SLO)	Red Bull–Bora–Hansgrohe	+ 10"
4	Richard Carapaz (ECU)	EF Education–EasyPost	+ 12"
5	Urko Berrade (ESP)	Equipo Kern Pharma	+ 14"
6	Ben O'Connor (AUS)	Decathlon–AG2R La Mondiale	+ 14"
7	David Gaudu (FRA)	Groupama–FDJ	+ 21"
8	Mikel Landa (ESP)	Soudal–Quick-Step	+ 23"
9	Florian Lipowitz (GER)	Red Bull–Bora–Hansgrohe	+ 37"
10	Mattias Skjelmose (DEN)	Lidl–Trek	+ 37"

General classification after Stage 20
Rank	Rider	Team	Time
1	Primož Roglič (SLO)	Red Bull–Bora–Hansgrohe	81h 22' 19"
2	Ben O'Connor (AUS)	Decathlon–AG2R La Mondiale	+ 2' 02"
3	Enric Mas (ESP)	Movistar Team	+ 2' 11"
4	Richard Carapaz (ECU)	EF Education–EasyPost	+ 3' 00"
5	David Gaudu (FRA)	Groupama–FDJ	+ 4' 48"
6	Mattias Skjelmose (DEN)	Lidl–Trek	+ 5' 18"
7	Florian Lipowitz (GER)	Red Bull–Bora–Hansgrohe	+ 6' 26"
8	Mikel Landa (ESP)	Soudal–Quick-Step	+ 6' 57"
9	Pavel Sivakov (FRA)	UAE Team Emirates	+ 8' 50"
10	Carlos Rodríguez (ESP)	Ineos Grenadiers	+ 10' 31"

== Stage 21 ==
8 September 2024 – Distrito Telefónica to Madrid, 24.6 km (15.3 mi) (ITT)

Stage 21 Result
Rank	Rider	Team	Time
1	Stefan Küng (SUI)	Groupama–FDJ	26' 28"
2	Primož Roglič (SLO)	Red Bull–Bora–Hansgrohe	+ 31"
3	Mattia Cattaneo (ITA)	Soudal–Quick-Step	+ 42"
4	Filippo Baroncini (ITA)	UAE Team Emirates	+ 43"
5	Mauro Schmid (SUI)	Team Jayco–AlUla	+ 46"
6	Mathias Vacek (CZE)	Lidl–Trek	+ 52"
7	Victor Campenaerts (BEL)	Lotto–Dstny	+ 54"
8	Mattias Skjelmose (DEN)	Lidl–Trek	+ 1' 02"
9	Harry Sweeny (AUS)	EF Education–EasyPost	+ 1' 03"
10	Bruno Armirail (FRA)	Decathlon–AG2R La Mondiale	+ 1' 03"

General classification after Stage 21
Rank	Rider	Team	Time
1	Primož Roglič (SLO)	Red Bull–Bora–Hansgrohe	81h 49' 18"
2	Ben O'Connor (AUS)	Decathlon–AG2R La Mondiale	+ 2' 36"
3	Enric Mas (ESP)	Movistar Team	+ 3' 13"
4	Richard Carapaz (ECU)	EF Education–EasyPost	+ 4' 02"
5	Mattias Skjelmose (DEN)	Lidl–Trek	+ 5' 49"
6	David Gaudu (FRA)	Groupama–FDJ	+ 6' 32"
7	Florian Lipowitz (GER)	Red Bull–Bora–Hansgrohe	+ 7' 05"
8	Mikel Landa (ESP)	Soudal–Quick-Step	+ 8' 48"
9	Pavel Sivakov (FRA)	UAE Team Emirates	+ 10' 04"
10	Carlos Rodríguez (ESP)	Ineos Grenadiers	+ 11' 19"
