= 2024 Ineos Grenadiers season =

INEOS Grenadiers
- 2024 season
- UCI code: IGD
- Status: UCI WorldTeam
- Manager: John Maxwell Allert (GBR)
- Main sponsor(s): Ineos
- Based: United Kingdom
- Bicycles: Pinarello
- Groupset: Shimano

Season victories
- One-day races: 1
- Stage race overall: 1
- Stage race stages: 9
- National Championships: 4
- Most wins: (Spain) Carlos Rodriguez (Italy) Filippo Ganna (3 wins each)

The 2024 season for the INEOS Grenadiers is the 15th season in the team's existence, all of which have been as a UCI WorldTeam. This is the sixth season with Ineos as the title sponsor and the fifth full season under the current name.

== Team roster ==
As of 5 January 2024.

Rider	Date of birth
Thymen Arensman (NED)	4 December 1999 (aged 24)
Andrew August (USA)	12 October 2005 (aged 18)
Egan Bernal (COL)	13 January 1997 (aged 26)
Jonathan Castroviejo (ESP)	27 April 1987 (aged 36)
Laurens De Plus (BEL)	4 September 1995 (aged 28)
Tobias Foss (NOR)	25 May 1997 (aged 26)
Omar Fraile (ESP)	17 July 1990 (aged 33)
Filippo Ganna (ITA)	25 July 1996 (aged 27)
Ethan Hayter (GBR)	18 September 1998 (aged 25)
Leo Hayter (GBR)	10 August 2001 (aged 22)
Kim Heiduk (GER)	3 March 2000 (aged 23)
Michał Kwiatkowski (POL)	2 June 1990 (aged 33)
Michael Leonard (CAN)	26 March 2004 (aged 19)
Jhonatan Narváez (ECU)	4 March 1997 (aged 26)
Tom Pidcock (GBR)	30 July 1999 (aged 24)

Rider	Date of birth
Salvatore Puccio (ITA)	31 August 1989 (aged 34)
Brandon Rivera (COL)	21 March 1996 (aged 27)
Carlos Rodriguez (ESP)	2 February 2001 (aged 22)
Óscar Rodríguez (ESP)	6 May 1995 (aged 28)
Luke Rowe (GBR)	10 March 1990 (aged 33)
Magnus Sheffield (USA)	19 April 2002 (aged 21)
Theodor Storm (DEN)	31 March 2005 (aged 18)
Ben Swift (GBR)	5 November 1987 (aged 36)
Connor Swift (GBR)	30 October 1995 (aged 28)
Joshua Tarling (GBR)	15 February 2004 (aged 19)
Geraint Thomas (GBR)	25 May 1986 (aged 37)
Ben Turner (GBR)	28 May 1999 (aged 24)
Elia Viviani (ITA)	7 February 1989 (aged 34)
Cameron Wurf (AUS)	3 August 1983 (aged 40)

== Season victories ==
Date	Race	Competition	Rider	Country	Location	Ref.
22 February	O Gran Camiño, stage 1 (ITT)	UCI Europe Tour	Josh Tarling (GBR)	Spain	A Coruña	
6 April	Tour of the Basque Country, stage 6	UCI World Tour	Carlos Rodríguez (ESP)	Spain	Eibar	
14 April	Amstel Gold Race	UCI World Tour	Tom Pidcock (GBR)	Netherlands	Berg en Terblijt	
15 April	Tour of the Alps, stage 1	UCI ProSeries	Tobias Foss (NOR)	Italy	Kurtinig	
28 April	Tour de Romandie, overall	UCI World Tour	Carlos Rodríguez (ESP)	Switzerland		
4 May	Giro d'Italia, stage 1	UCI World Tour	Jhonatan Narváez (ECU)	Italy	Turin	
18 May	Giro d'Italia, stage 14 (ITT)	UCI World Tour	Filippo Ganna (ITA)	Italy	Desenzano del Garda	
9 June	Critérium du Dauphiné, stage 8	UCI World Tour	Carlos Rodríguez (ESP)	France	Plateau des Glières	
4 July	Tour of Austria, stage 2	UCI Europe Tour	Brandon Smith Rivera (COL)	Austria	Steyr	
6 July	Tour of Austria, stage 4	UCI Europe Tour	Filippo Ganna (ITA)	Austria	Kals	

== National, Continental, and World Champions ==
Date	Discipline	Jersey	Rider	Country	Location	Ref.
3 February	Ecuadorian National Road Championships		Jhonatan Narváez (ECU)	Ecuador	Riobamba	
19 June	British National Time Trial Championships		Joshua Tarling (UK)	United Kingdom	Catterick	
20 June	Italian National Time Trial Championships		Filippo Ganna (ITA)	Italy	Grosseto	
23 June	British National Road Championships		Ethan Hayter (UK)	United Kingdom	Saltburn-by-the-Sea	
