= 2024 Tour de Romandie =

2024 UCI World Tour, race 20 of 35

Race details
- Dates: 23–28 April 2024
- Stages: 5 + Prologue
- Distance: 656.98 km (408.23 mi)
- Winning time: 15h 44' 46"

Results
Jersey awarded to the overall winner	Winner	Carlos Rodríguez (ESP)	(INEOS Grenadiers)
	Second	Aleksandr Vlasov	(Bora–Hansgrohe)
	Third	Florian Lipowitz (GER)	(Bora–Hansgrohe)
Jersey awarded to the points classification winner	Points	Dorian Godon (FRA)	(Decathlon–AG2R La Mondiale)
Jersey awarded to the mountains classification winner	Mountains	Juri Hollmann (GER)	(Alpecin–Deceuninck)
Jersey awarded to the young rider classification winner	Young rider	Carlos Rodríguez (ESP)	(INEOS Grenadiers)
Jersey awarded to the combativity classification winner	Combativity	Andrea Vendrame (ITA)	(Decathlon–AG2R La Mondiale)
	Team	(United Arab Emirates) UAE Team Emirates	

The 2024 Tour de Romandie was a road cycling stage race held between 23 and 28 April 2024 in Romandy, the French-speaking part of western Switzerland. It was the 77th edition of the Tour de Romandie and the 20th race of the 2024 UCI World Tour.

== Teams ==
All eighteen UCI WorldTeams, four UCI ProTeams, and the Swiss national team participated in the race.

UCI WorldTeams

- Alpecin–Deceuninck
- Arkéa–B&B Hotels
- Astana Qazaqstan Team
- Bora–Hansgrohe
- Cofidis
- Decathlon–AG2R La Mondiale
- EF Education–EasyPost
- Groupama–FDJ
- INEOS Grenadiers
- Intermarché–Wanty
- Lidl–Trek
- Movistar Team
- Soudal–Quick-Step
- Team Bahrain Victorious
- Team dsm–firmenich PostNL
- Team Jayco–AlUla
- UAE Team Emirates
- Visma–Lease a Bike

UCI ProTeams

- Lotto–Dstny
- Q36.5 Pro Cycling Team
- Team Corratec–Vini Fantini
- Tudor Pro Cycling Team

National Teams

- Switzerland

== Route ==
Stage characteristics and winners
Stage	Date	Route	Distance	Type	Winner
P	23 April	Payerne	2.28 km (1.42 mi)	Individual time trial	Maikel Zijlaard (NED)
1	24 April	Château d'Oex to Fribourg	165.7 km (103.0 mi)	Hilly stage	Dorian Godon (FRA)
2	25 April	Fribourg to Salvan/Les Marécottes	171 km (106 mi)	Mountain stage	Thibau Nys (BEL)
3	26 April	Oron to Oron	15.5 km (9.6 mi)	Individual time trial	Brandon McNulty (USA)
4	27 April	Saillon to Leysin	151.7 km (94.3 mi)	Mountain stage	Richard Carapaz (ECU)
5	28 April	Vernier to Vernier	150.8 km (93.7 mi)	Hilly stage	Dorian Godon (FRA)
Total			656.98 km (408.23 mi)		

== Stages ==
=== Prologue ===
23 April 2024 — Payerne, 2.28 kilometres (1.42 mi) (ITT)

Prologue result
Rank	Rider	Team	Time
1	Maikel Zijlaard (NED)	Tudor Pro Cycling Team	2' 55"
2	Cameron Scott (AUS)	Team Bahrain Victorious	+ 1"
3	Julian Alaphilippe (FRA)	Soudal–Quick-Step	+ 2"
4	Dorian Godon (FRA)	Decathlon–AG2R La Mondiale	+ 3"
5	Ivo Oliveira (POR)	UAE Team Emirates	+ 3"
6	Tim van Dijke (NED)	Visma–Lease a Bike	+ 3"
7	Gianni Vermeersch (BEL)	Alpecin–Deceuninck	+ 3"
8	Nikias Arndt (GER)	Team Bahrain Victorious	+ 4"
9	Alex Aranburu (ESP)	Movistar Team	+ 4"
10	Antoine Aebi (SUI)	Switzerland	+ 4"

General classification after prologue
Rank	Rider	Team	Time
1	Maikel Zijlaard (NED)	Tudor Pro Cycling Team	2' 55"
2	Cameron Scott (AUS)	Team Bahrain Victorious	+ 1"
3	Julian Alaphilippe (FRA)	Soudal–Quick-Step	+ 2"
4	Dorian Godon (FRA)	Decathlon–AG2R La Mondiale	+ 3"
5	Ivo Oliveira (POR)	UAE Team Emirates	+ 3"
6	Tim van Dijke (NED)	Visma–Lease a Bike	+ 3"
7	Gianni Vermeersch (BEL)	Alpecin–Deceuninck	+ 3"
8	Nikias Arndt (GER)	Team Bahrain Victorious	+ 4"
9	Alex Aranburu (ESP)	Movistar Team	+ 4"
10	Antoine Aebi (SUI)	Switzerland	+ 4"

=== Stage 1 ===
24 April 2024 — Château d'Oex to Fribourg, 165.7 kilometres (103.0 mi)

Stage 1 result
Rank	Rider	Team	Time
1	Dorian Godon (FRA)	Decathlon–AG2R La Mondiale	3h 49' 58"
2	Andrea Vendrame (ITA)	Decathlon–AG2R La Mondiale	+ 0"
3	Gianni Vermeersch (BEL)	Alpecin–Deceuninck	+ 0"
4	Milan Menten (BEL)	Lotto–Dstny	+ 0"
5	Kasper Asgreen (DEN)	Soudal–Quick-Step	+ 0"
6	Matevž Govekar (SLO)	Team Bahrain Victorious	+ 0"
7	Alex Aranburu (ESP)	Movistar Team	+ 0"
8	Clement Venturini (FRA)	Arkéa–B&B Hotels	+ 0"
9	Thibaud Gruel (FRA)	Groupama–FDJ	+ 0"
10	Kobe Goossens (BEL)	Intermarché–Wanty	+ 0"

General classification after stage 1
Rank	Rider	Team	Time
1	Dorian Godon (FRA)	Decathlon–AG2R La Mondiale	3h 52' 46"
2	Gianni Vermeersch (BEL)	Alpecin–Deceuninck	+ 6"
3	Julian Alaphilippe (FRA)	Soudal–Quick-Step	+ 9"
4	Tim van Dijke (NED)	Visma–Lease a Bike	+ 10"
5	Alex Aranburu (ESP)	Movistar Team	+ 11"
6	Antoine Aebi (SUI)	Switzerland	+ 11"
7	Jan Christen (SUI)	UAE Team Emirates	+ 11"
8	Ilan Van Wilder (BEL)	Soudal–Quick-Step	+ 11"
9	Andrea Vendrame (ITA)	Decathlon–AG2R La Mondiale	+ 12"
10	Matevž Govekar (SLO)	Team Bahrain Victorious	+ 12"

=== Stage 2 ===
25 April 2024 — Fribourg to Salvan/Les Marécottes, 171 kilometres (106 mi)

Stage 2 result
Rank	Rider	Team	Time
1	Thibau Nys (BEL)	Lidl–Trek	4h 02' 44"
2	Andrea Vendrame (ITA)	Decathlon–AG2R La Mondiale	+ 0"
3	Luke Plapp (AUS)	Team Jayco–AlUla	+ 4"
4	Florian Lipowitz (GER)	Bora–Hansgrohe	+ 14"
5	Juan Ayuso (ESP)	UAE Team Emirates	+ 16"
6	Aleksandr Vlasov	Bora–Hansgrohe	+ 16"
7	Adam Yates (GBR)	UAE Team Emirates	+ 16"
8	Guillaume Martin (FRA)	Cofidis	+ 16"
9	Ilan Van Wilder (BEL)	Soudal–Quick-Step	+ 16"
10	Lenny Martinez (FRA)	Groupama–FDJ	+ 16"

General classification after stage 2
Rank	Rider	Team	Time
1	Thibau Nys (BEL)	Lidl–Trek	7h 55' 32"
2	Andrea Vendrame (ITA)	Decathlon–AG2R La Mondiale	+ 4"
3	Luke Plapp (AUS)	Team Jayco–AlUla	+ 22"
4	Ilan Van Wilder (BEL)	Soudal–Quick-Step	+ 25"
5	Enric Mas (ESP)	Movistar Team	+ 26"
6	Lenny Martinez (FRA)	Groupama–FDJ	+ 27"
7	Juan Ayuso (ESP)	UAE Team Emirates	+ 27"
8	Aleksandr Vlasov	Bora–Hansgrohe	+ 28"
9	Yannis Voisard (SUI)	Tudor Pro Cycling Team	+ 29"
10	Adam Yates (GBR)	UAE Team Emirates	+ 29"

=== Stage 3 ===
26 April 2024 — Oron to Oron, 15.5 kilometres (9.6 mi) (ITT)

Stage 3 result
Rank	Rider	Team	Time
1	Brandon McNulty (USA)	UAE Team Emirates	20' 06"
2	Magnus Sheffield (USA)	INEOS Grenadiers	+ 13"
3	Felix Großschartner (AUT)	UAE Team Emirates	+ 15"
4	Juan Ayuso (ESP)	UAE Team Emirates	+ 21"
5	Bruno Armirail (FRA)	Decathlon–AG2R La Mondiale	+ 23"
6	Johan Price-Pejtersen (DEN)	Team Bahrain Victorious	+ 24"
7	Carlos Rodríguez (ESP)	INEOS Grenadiers	+ 28"
8	Aleksandr Vlasov	Bora–Hansgrohe	+ 30"
9	Ilan Van Wilder (BEL)	Soudal–Quick-Step	+ 30"
10	Benjamin Thomas (FRA)	Cofidis	+ 32"

General classification after stage 3
Rank	Rider	Team	Time
1	Juan Ayuso (ESP)	UAE Team Emirates	8h 16' 26"
2	Ilan Van Wilder (BEL)	Soudal–Quick-Step	+ 7"
3	Aleksandr Vlasov	Bora–Hansgrohe	+ 10"
4	Carlos Rodríguez (ESP)	INEOS Grenadiers	+ 11"
5	Lenny Martinez (FRA)	Groupama–FDJ	+ 23"
6	Florian Lipowitz (GER)	Bora–Hansgrohe	+ 32"
7	Luke Plapp (AUS)	Team Jayco–AlUla	+ 33"
8	Bruno Armirail (FRA)	Decathlon–AG2R La Mondiale	+ 36"
9	Yannis Voisard (SUI)	Tudor Pro Cycling Team	+ 36"
10	Damiano Caruso (ITA)	Team Bahrain Victorious	+ 36"

=== Stage 4 ===
27 April 2024 — Saillon to Leysin, 151.7 kilometres (94.3 mi)

Stage 4 result
Rank	Rider	Team	Time
1	Richard Carapaz (ECU)	EF Education–EasyPost	4h 06' 03"
2	Florian Lipowitz (GER)	Bora–Hansgrohe	+ 0"
3	Carlos Rodríguez (ESP)	INEOS Grenadiers	+ 10"
4	Enric Mas (ESP)	Movistar Team	+ 14"
5	Aleksandr Vlasov	Bora–Hansgrohe	+ 14"
6	Egan Bernal (COL)	INEOS Grenadiers	+ 27"
7	Ilan Van Wilder (BEL)	Soudal–Quick-Step	+ 31"
8	Tao Geoghegan Hart (GBR)	Lidl–Trek	+ 40"
9	David Gaudu (FRA)	Groupama–FDJ	+ 41"
10	Cristián Rodríguez (ESP)	Arkéa–B&B Hotels	+ 44"

General classification after stage 4
Rank	Rider	Team	Time
1	Carlos Rodríguez (ESP)	INEOS Grenadiers	12h 22' 46"
2	Aleksandr Vlasov	Bora–Hansgrohe	+ 7"
3	Florian Lipowitz (GER)	Bora–Hansgrohe	+ 9"
4	Ilan Van Wilder (BEL)	Soudal–Quick-Step	+ 21"
5	Juan Ayuso (ESP)	UAE Team Emirates	+ 27"
6	Enric Mas (ESP)	Movistar Team	+ 38"
7	Richard Carapaz (ECU)	EF Education–EasyPost	+ 49"
8	Lenny Martinez (FRA)	Groupama–FDJ	+ 52"
9	Tao Geoghegan Hart (GBR)	Lidl–Trek	+ 1' 02"
10	Egan Bernal (COL)	INEOS Grenadiers	+ 1' 23"

=== Stage 5 ===
28 April 2024 — Vernier to Vernier, 150.8 kilometres (93.7 mi)

Stage 5 result
Rank	Rider	Team	Time
1	Dorian Godon (FRA)	Decathlon–AG2R La Mondiale	3h 22' 00"
2	Simone Consonni (ITA)	Lidl–Trek	+ 0"
3	Dion Smith (NZL)	Intermarché–Wanty	+ 0"
4	Tim van Dijke (NED)	Visma–Lease a Bike	+ 0"
5	Alex Aranburu (ESP)	Movistar Team	+ 0"
6	Thibau Nys (BEL)	Lidl–Trek	+ 0"
7	Clément Venturini (FRA)	Arkéa–B&B Hotels	+ 0"
8	Milan Menten (BEL)	Lotto–Dstny	+ 0"
9	Thibaud Gruel (FRA)	Groupama–FDJ	+ 0"
10	Gianni Vermeersch (BEL)	Alpecin–Deceuninck	+ 0"

General classification after stage 5
Rank	Rider	Team	Time
1	Carlos Rodríguez (ESP)	INEOS Grenadiers	15h 44' 46"
2	Aleksandr Vlasov	Bora–Hansgrohe	+ 7"
3	Florian Lipowitz (GER)	Bora–Hansgrohe	+ 9"
4	Ilan Van Wilder (BEL)	Soudal–Quick-Step	+ 21"
5	Juan Ayuso (ESP)	UAE Team Emirates	+ 27"
6	Enric Mas (ESP)	Movistar Team	+ 38"
7	Richard Carapaz (ECU)	EF Education–EasyPost	+ 49"
8	Lenny Martinez (FRA)	Groupama–FDJ	+ 52"
9	Tao Geoghegan Hart (GBR)	Lidl–Trek	+ 1' 02"
10	Egan Bernal (COL)	INEOS Grenadiers	+ 1' 23"

== Classification leadership table ==
Classification leadership by stage
Stage	Winner	General classification	Points classification	Mountains classification	Young rider classification	Team classification	Combativity award
P	Maikel Zijlaard	Maikel Zijlaard	Maikel Zijlaard	not awarded	Tim van Dijke	Team Bahrain Victorious	not awarded
1	Dorian Godon	Dorian Godon	Dorian Godon	Juri Hollmann	Tim van Dijke	Team Bahrain Victorious	Fausto Masnada
2	Thibau Nys	Thibau Nys	Andrea Vendrame	Juri Hollmann	Thibau Nys	Bora–Hansgrohe	Roger Adrià
3	Brandon McNulty	Juan Ayuso	Andrea Vendrame	Juri Hollmann	Juan Ayuso	UAE Team Emirates	not awarded
4	Richard Carapaz	Carlos Rodríguez	Andrea Vendrame	Juri Hollmann	Carlos Rodríguez	UAE Team Emirates	Clément Berthet
5	Dorian Godon	Carlos Rodríguez	Dorian Godon	Juri Hollmann	Carlos Rodríguez	UAE Team Emirates	Rémi Cavagna
Final		Carlos Rodríguez	Dorian Godon	Juri Hollmann	Carlos Rodríguez	UAE Team Emirates	Andrea Vendrame

== Classification standings ==
Legend
Denotes the winner of the general classification	Denotes the winner of the young rider classification
Denotes the winner of the points classification	Denotes the winner of the combativity award
Denotes the winner of the mountains classification	

=== General classification ===
Final general classification (1–10)
Rank	Rider	Team	Time
1	Carlos Rodríguez (ESP)	INEOS Grenadiers	15h 44' 46"
2	Aleksandr Vlasov	Bora–Hansgrohe	+ 7"
3	Florian Lipowitz (GER)	Bora–Hansgrohe	+ 9"
4	Ilan Van Wilder (BEL)	Soudal–Quick-Step	+ 21"
5	Juan Ayuso (ESP)	UAE Team Emirates	+ 27"
6	Enric Mas (ESP)	Movistar Team	+ 38"
7	Richard Carapaz (ECU)	EF Education–EasyPost	+ 49"
8	Lenny Martinez (FRA)	Groupama–FDJ	+ 52"
9	Tao Geoghegan Hart (GBR)	Lidl–Trek	+ 1' 02"
10	Egan Bernal (COL)	INEOS Grenadiers	+ 1' 23"

=== Points classification ===
Final points classification (1–10)
Rank	Rider	Team	Points
1	Dorian Godon (FRA)	Decathlon–AG2R La Mondiale	119
2	Andrea Vendrame (ITA)	Decathlon–AG2R La Mondiale	111
3	Thibau Nys (BEL)	Lidl–Trek	74
4	Florian Lipowitz (GER)	Bora–Hansgrohe	43
5	Aleksandr Vlasov	Bora–Hansgrohe	42
6	Juan Ayuso (ESP)	UAE Team Emirates	41
7	Gianni Vermeersch (BEL)	Alpecin–Deceuninck	40
8	Carlos Rodríguez (ESP)	INEOS Grenadiers	39
9	Alex Aranburu (ESP)	Movistar Team	37
10	Ilan Van Wilder (BEL)	Soudal–Quick-Step	35

=== Mountains classification ===
Final mountains classification (1–10)
Rank	Rider	Team	Points
1	Juri Hollmann (GER)	Alpecin–Deceuninck	35
2	Bart Lemmen (NED)	Visma–Lease a Bike	24
3	Fausto Masnada (ITA)	Soudal–Quick-Step	23
4	Nelson Oliveira (POR)	Movistar Team	18
5	Andrea Vendrame (ITA)	Decathlon–AG2R La Mondiale	16
6	Raúl García Pierna (ESP)	Arkéa–B&B Hotels	16
7	Richard Carapaz (ECU)	EF Education–EasyPost	15
8	Clément Berthet (FRA)	Decathlon–AG2R La Mondiale	15
9	Carlos Rodríguez (ESP)	INEOS Grenadiers	10
10	Rémi Cavagna (FRA)	Soudal–Quick-Step	10

=== Young rider classification ===
Final young rider classification (1–10)
Rank	Rider	Team	Time
1	Carlos Rodríguez (ESP)	INEOS Grenadiers	15h 44' 46"
2	Florian Lipowitz (GER)	Bora–Hansgrohe	+ 9"
3	Ilan Van Wilder (BEL)	Soudal–Quick-Step	+ 21"
4	Juan Ayuso (ESP)	UAE Team Emirates	+ 27"
5	Lenny Martinez (FRA)	Groupama–FDJ	+ 52"
6	Johannes Staune-Mittet (NOR)	Visma–Lease a Bike	+ 3' 43"
7	Darren Rafferty (IRL)	EF Education–EasyPost	+ 3' 59"
8	Jan Christen (SUI)	UAE Team Emirates	+ 9' 00"
9	Edoardo Zambanini (ITA)	Team Bahrain Victorious	+ 16' 55"
10	Thibau Nys (BEL)	Lidl–Trek	+ 24' 54"

=== Team classification ===
Final team classification (1–10)
Rank	Team	Time
1	(United Arab Emirates) UAE Team Emirates	47h 16' 20"
2	(Germany) Bora–Hansgrohe	+ 45"
3	(United Kingdom) INEOS Grenadiers	+ 1' 51"
4	(Switzerland) Q36.5 Pro Cycling Team	+ 10' 33"
5	(France) Groupama–FDJ	+ 12' 11"
6	(United States) Lidl–Trek	+ 15' 57"
7	(Spain) Movistar Team	+ 16' 32"
8	(Australia) Team Jayco–AlUla	+ 18' 17"
9	(United States) EF Education–EasyPost	+ 19' 23"
10	(Netherlands) Visma–Lease a Bike	+ 22' 16"
