= Eddie Dunbar =

Irish cyclist (born 1996)

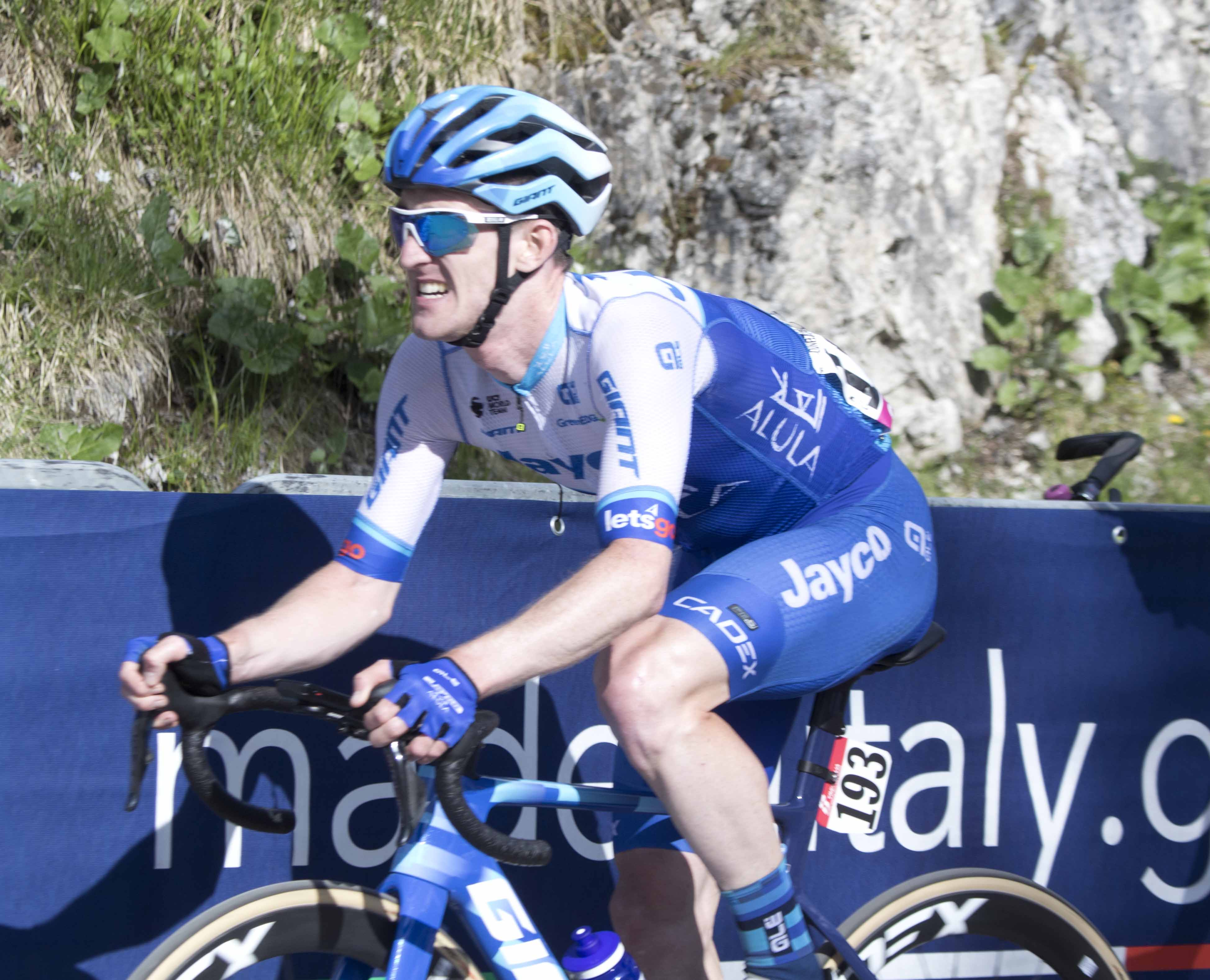
- Dunbar, 2023 Giro d'Italia.

Personal information
- Full name: Edward Dunbar
- Born: 1 September 1996 (age 30) Banteer, County Cork, Ireland
- Height: 1.70 m (5 ft 7 in)
- Weight: 57 kg (126 lb)

Cycling career
- Sport: Cycling
- Current team: Pinarello–Q36.5 Pro Cycling Team
- Discipline: Road
- Role: Rider
- Rider type: Climbing specialist

Amateur team
- 2013–2014: O'Leary's Stone Kanturk

Professional teams
- 2015: NFTO
- 2016–2017: Axeon–Hagens Berman
- 2018: Aqua Blue Sport
- 2018–2022: Team Sky
- 2023–2025: Team Jayco–AlUla
- 2026–: Pinarello–Q36.5 Pro Cycling Team

Major wins
- Grand Tours Vuelta a España 3 individual stages (2024, 2026) One-day races and Classics National Time Trial Championships (2024)

Edward Dunbar (born 1 September 1996) is an Irish professional racing cyclist who rides for UCI ProTeam Pinarello–Q36.5 Pro Cycling Team. Dunbar won stage 19 at the 2026 Vuelta a España, two stages at the 2024 Vuelta a España and was the 2024 Irish National Time Trial Champion.

== Career ==
=== Amateur career ===
Hailing from Banteer, County Cork, Dunbar joined local amateur team O'Leary Stone Kanturk in 2013. He quickly shot to prominence on the national junior scene, winning the Irish National Championships Junior Time Trial the same year. He followed this up with victory in the junior Road Race and third in the junior Time Trial in 2014. He was named 2014 Irish Male Cyclist of the Year at the Cycling Ireland Awards.

=== Aqua Blue Sport & Team Sky (2018–22) ===
Dunbar joined Irish team Aqua Blue Sport for the 2018 season. However, the team encountered financial difficulties and was given dispensation by the governing body UCI to allow riders to move to other teams. Dunbar was transferred to Team Sky in September 2018. He competed in the 2019 Giro d'Italia and came third on stage twelve of the race.

=== Team Jayco–AlUla ===
In August 2022, it was announced that Dunbar was to join Team Jayco–AlUla from the 2023 season, on a three-year contract. He finished 7th in the 2023 Giro d’Italia.

=== Pinarello Q36.5 ===
In August 2025, Dunbar signed a two-year contract with Pinarello Q36.5 starting from the 2026 season.

== Race wins ==
Dunbar has five professional wins, and a further win in a professional race while temporarily riding as an amateur. These include two general classification victories, three stage wins and a national time trial championship.

He won two stages at the 2024 Vuelta a España, finishing first on stages eleven and twenty. On stage eleven, he was in a large group that broke clear of the peloton early in the stage and stayed ahead of the main field for over 100 km. Approaching the finish in a group of fourteen riders, he sprinted clear with one kilometre to go and held on to win the stage ahead of Quinten Hermans and Max Poole.

His win on stage twenty came after he moved clear of the race leader's group with five kilometres to go and started to chase down stage leader Pavel Sivakov. Dunbar made up the deficit of forty seconds and continued to push on the hilly terrain as Sivakov faded, ultimately taking the win by seven seconds from Enric Mas. Race leader and eventual champion Primož Roglič was a further three seconds behind in third place.

He took his first general classification win at the 2022 Settimana Internazionale di Coppi e Bartali, a five-stage race in Italy. Dunbar finished second to Mauro Schmid on stage one and moved into the race lead after the second stage. He held the lead from there until the end of the race, finishing nine seconds ahead of Ben Tulett. His second overall victory came a few weeks later at the 2022 Tour de Hongrie. The first four stages were won by sprinters, with the fifth and final stage proving decisive. Dunbar took the overall victory after a second-place finish on the last day, winning by twenty-three seconds ahead of Óscar Rodríguez.

Dunbar was the 2024 Irish National Time Trial Champion. Raced on a 36.6 km course around Athea, Dunbar finished 15 seconds ahead of Ryan Mullen to take his first elite national title. Dunbar had finished second in the race behind six-time winner Mullen on three previous occasions.

His first win in a professional race came at the 2016 An Post Rás. Dunbar won stage seven from Dungarvan to Baltinglass and finished fourth in the general classification. At the time, Dunbar was riding professionally with American team Axeon Hagens Berman. However, the team did not enter the race and Dunbar rode as part of the nominally amateur Irish National Team.

== Grand Tour participation ==
In addition to the 2026 Vuelta a España, where he won stage 19, and the 2024 Vuelta a España where he finished eleventh and scored two stage victories, Dunbar also competed in the 2023 Vuelta and the 2019, 2023 and 2024 editions of the Giro d'Italia.

In his first Grand Tour appearance at the 2019 Giro, Dunbar finished the race in 22nd place and was the second-highest overall finisher on the Ineos Grenadiers team. He finished third on stage twelve from Cuneo to Pinerolo, his first stage podium in a Grand Tour race. Dunbar finished the race ahead of future Grand Tour winners Jai Hindley and Sepp Kuss.

His second appearance at one of cycling's showpiece three-week races came at the Giro in 2023, taking five top-ten stage results on his way to seventh place overall. He finished fourth on stage 16 from Sabbio Chiese to Monte Bondone, his best stage result of the race. He returned to the Giro in 2024 but withdrew early in the race after crashing on stage two. He remounted and completed the stage but did not take the start for stage three.

His first Vuelta appearance came in 2023. He was in 42nd place overall after stage four but crashed in the neutral zone before the official start of stage five and withdrew from the race.

== Major results ==
2013
1st Time trial, National Junior Road Championships
5th Overall Junior Tour of Wales
2014
National Junior Road Championships

1st Road race
3rd Time trial

1st Overall Junior Tour of Wales

1st Stages 2 & 5

1st Overall Trofeo Karlsberg
2nd Shay Elliott Memorial Race
2015
National Road Championships

1st Under-23 road race
2nd Time trial
2nd Road race
2nd Under-23 time trial

4th Overall Tour of the Reservoir
9th Time trial, UEC European Under-23 Road Championships
2016
National Road Championships

1st Under-23 time trial
2nd Time trial

4th Overall An Post Rás

1st Stage 7

6th Time trial, UEC European Under-23 Road Championships
9th Time trial, UCI Under-23 Road World Championships
2017
1st Ronde van Vlaanderen Beloften
2nd Overall Le Triptyque des Monts et Châteaux
3rd Time trial, National Under-23 Road Championships
3rd Trofeo Città di San Vendemiano
5th Overall Volta ao Alentejo
5th Clássica da Arrábida
6th Gran Premio Palio del Recioto
2018
4th Overall Tour of Belgium
5th Volta Limburg Classic
8th Overall Tour de Yorkshire
8th Overall Tour de l'Avenir
8th Memorial Marco Pantani
2019
National Road Championships

2nd Road race
2nd Time trial

3rd Overall Tour de Yorkshire
5th Overall Route d'Occitanie
6th Overall Tour de Wallonie
6th Giro della Toscana
7th Overall Tour de la Provence
2020
4th Giro dell'Emilia
6th Overall Tour de la Provence
2021
1st Young rider classification, Tour de Suisse
9th GP Industria & Artigianato di Larciano
2022 (2 pro wins)
1st Overall Settimana Internazionale di Coppi e Bartali
1st Overall Tour de Hongrie
3rd Time trial, National Road Championships
2023
7th Overall Giro d'Italia
7th Overall Tour de Pologne
9th Overall Tour de Romandie
2024 (3)
1st Time trial, National Road Championships
Vuelta a España

1st Stages 11 & 20

2026 (1)
Vuelta a España

1st Stage 19
Combativity award Stage 19

=== Grand Tour general classification results timeline ===
Grand Tour	2019	2020	2021	2022	2023	2024	2025	2026
Giro d'Italia	22	—	—	—	7	—	—	—
Tour de France	—	—	—	—	—	—	DNF	—
Vuelta a España	—	—	—	—	DNF	11	21	DNF

Legend
—	Did not compete
DNF	Did not finish

=== Awards ===
In 2014, Dunbar was named as the Irish Male Cyclist of the Year.
