= Juri Hollmann =

German cyclist

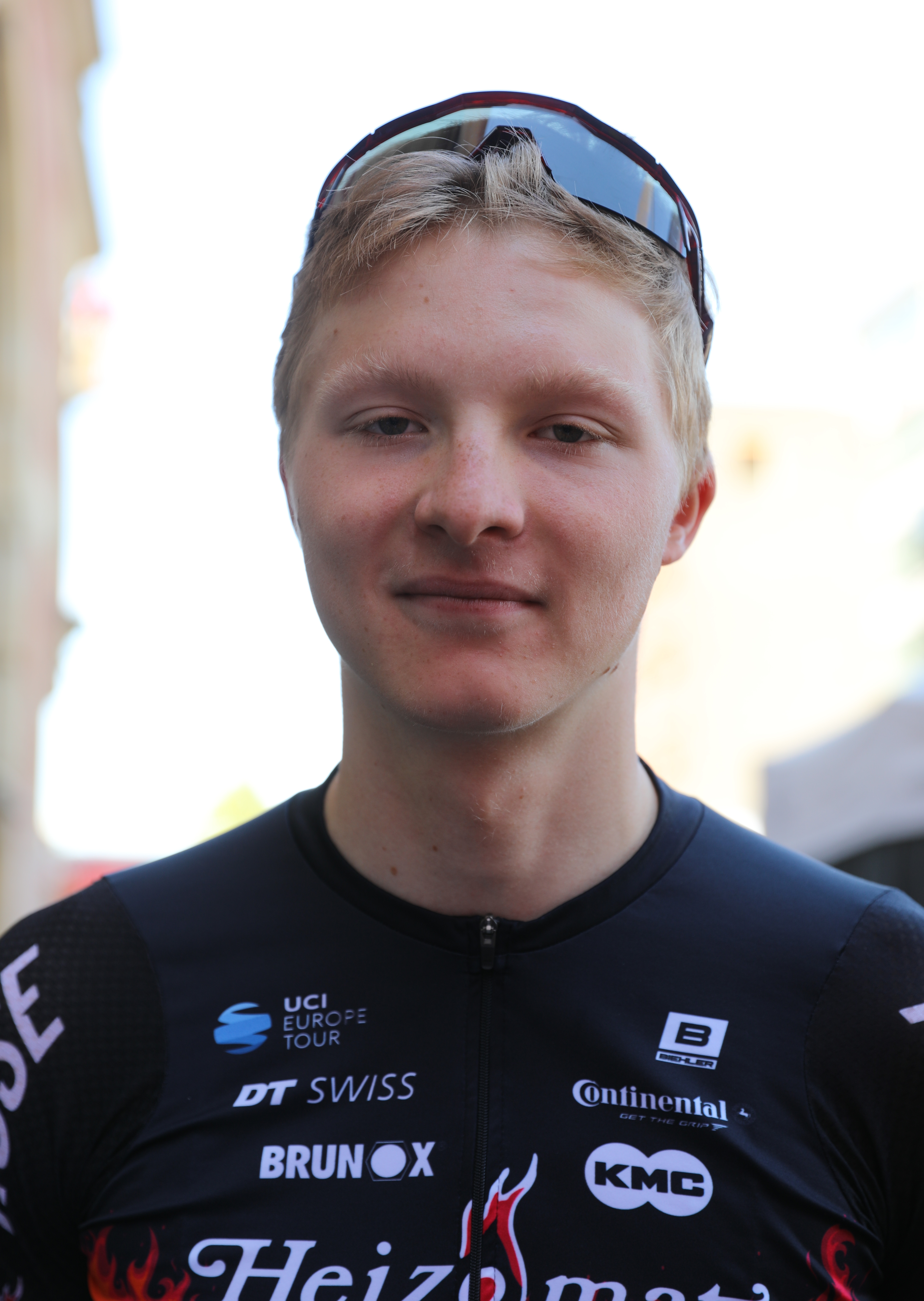
- Hollmann in 2019

Personal information
- Born: 30 August 1999 (age 27) Berlin, Germany
- Height: 1.85 m (6 ft 1 in)
- Weight: 70 kg (154 lb)

Cycling career
- Sport: Cycling
- Current team: Alpecin–Premier Tech
- Discipline: Road
- Role: Rider

Professional teams
- 2018–2019: Heizomat–rad-net.de
- 2019: Team Katusha–Alpecin (stagiaire)
- 2020–2023: Movistar Team
- 2024–2025: Alpecin–Deceuninck

Juri Hollmann (born 30 August 1999 in Berlin) is a German cyclist, who currently rides for UCI WorldTeam Alpecin–Premier Tech.

== Major results ==
2016
National Junior Track Championships

1st Team pursuit
2nd Individual pursuit

9th Overall La Coupe du Président de la Ville de Grudziądz

1st Stage 1a (TTT)

2017
1st Overall Internationale Cottbuser Junioren-Etappenfahrt

1st Stage 2a (ITT)

4th Time trial, UCI Junior Road World Championships
8th Overall Internationale Niedersachsen-Rundfahrt der Junioren
2018
6th Overall Szlakiem Walk Majora Hubala
2019
3rd Time trial, National Under-23 Road Championships
2024
1st Mountains classification, Tour de Romandie

=== Grand Tour general classification results timeline ===
Grand Tour	2024	2025
Giro d'Italia	—	DNF
Tour de France	—	
Vuelta a España	96	

Legend
—	Did not compete
DNF	Did not finish
NH	Not held
