= David Gaudu =

French cyclist (born 1996)

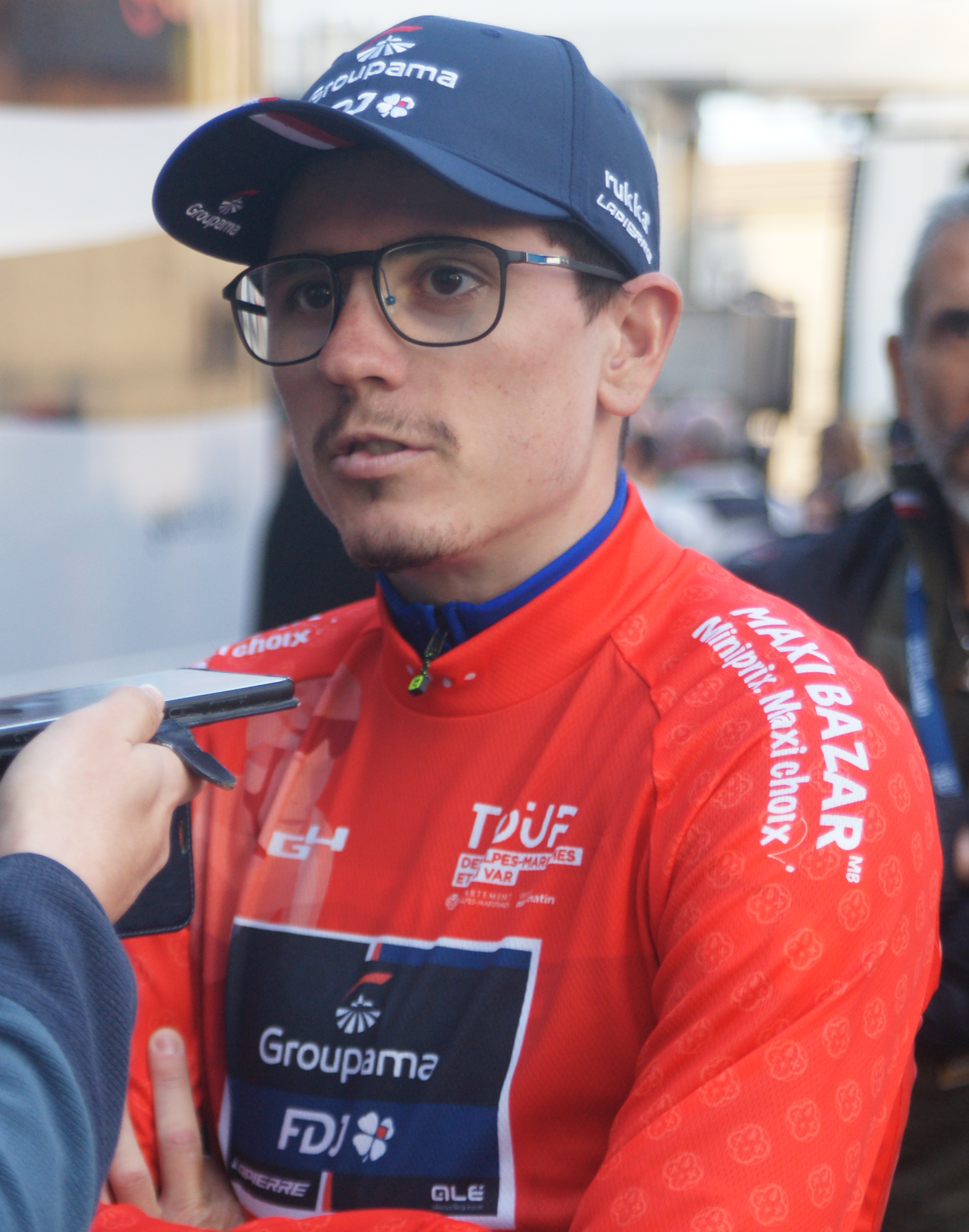
- Gaudu in 2023

Personal information
- Born: 10 October 1996 (age 30) Landivisiau, France
- Height: 1.73 m (5 ft 8 in)
- Weight: 57.5 kg (127 lb)

Cycling career
- Sport: Cycling
- Current team: Groupama–FDJ United
- Discipline: Road
- Role: Rider
- Rider type: Climber

Amateur team
- 2015–2016: Cotes d'Armor–Marie Morin

Professional teams
- 2016: FDJ (stagiaire)
- 2017–: FDJ

Major wins
- Grand Tours Vuelta a España 3 individual stages (2020, 2025) One-day races and Classics Ardèche Classic (2021)

David Gaudu (born 10 October 1996) is a French professional cyclist who rides for UCI WorldTeam Groupama–FDJ United.

== Career ==
In 2016, Gaudu won the Tour de l'Avenir, the most prestigious U23 cycling race. In addition to this he won the Peace Race U23 and finished 5th in the Tour de l'Ain, a UCI 2.1 cycling race. These successes earned him an initial two-year contract with UCI WorldTeam FDJ.

In July 2018, he was named in the start list for the 2018 Tour de France. In October 2020, he was named in the startlist for the 2020 Vuelta a España. The 2020 Vuelta was his strongest performance in a Grand Tour thus far in his career as he won stage 11, as well as stage 17, and finished the race in 8th place overall.

On stage 3 of the 2022 Critérium du Dauphiné Gaudu was five or six riders deep as the sprint for the finish line began. Wout Van Aert overpowered all the other riders and as the finish approached began to celebrate when he noticed Gaudu flying past him out of the corner of his eye and immediately lowered his hands knowing he had been bested. Gaudu slowed to a stop a few hundred meters past the finish line and celebrated with his teammates.

Prior to the start of the 2022 Tour de France Gaudu signed a contract extension through 2025 with Groupama–FDJ. He said that he just could not see himself riding for any other colours. During the Tour he had the requisite first week luck and throughout the second week stayed with the majority of the elite GC contenders. He was also in a battle with respected veteran Romain Bardet for the highest placed French rider, although he did essentially say that being the best French rider shouldn't be the goal if French riding wants to regain the top step of the Tour podium. Gaudu survived the final climbs of Peyragudes and Hautacam as the heavy climbing ended in the Pyrenees. He was in position to finish top 5 overall going into the final ITT. He rode strong enough during the time trial to enter Paris in 4th place overall.

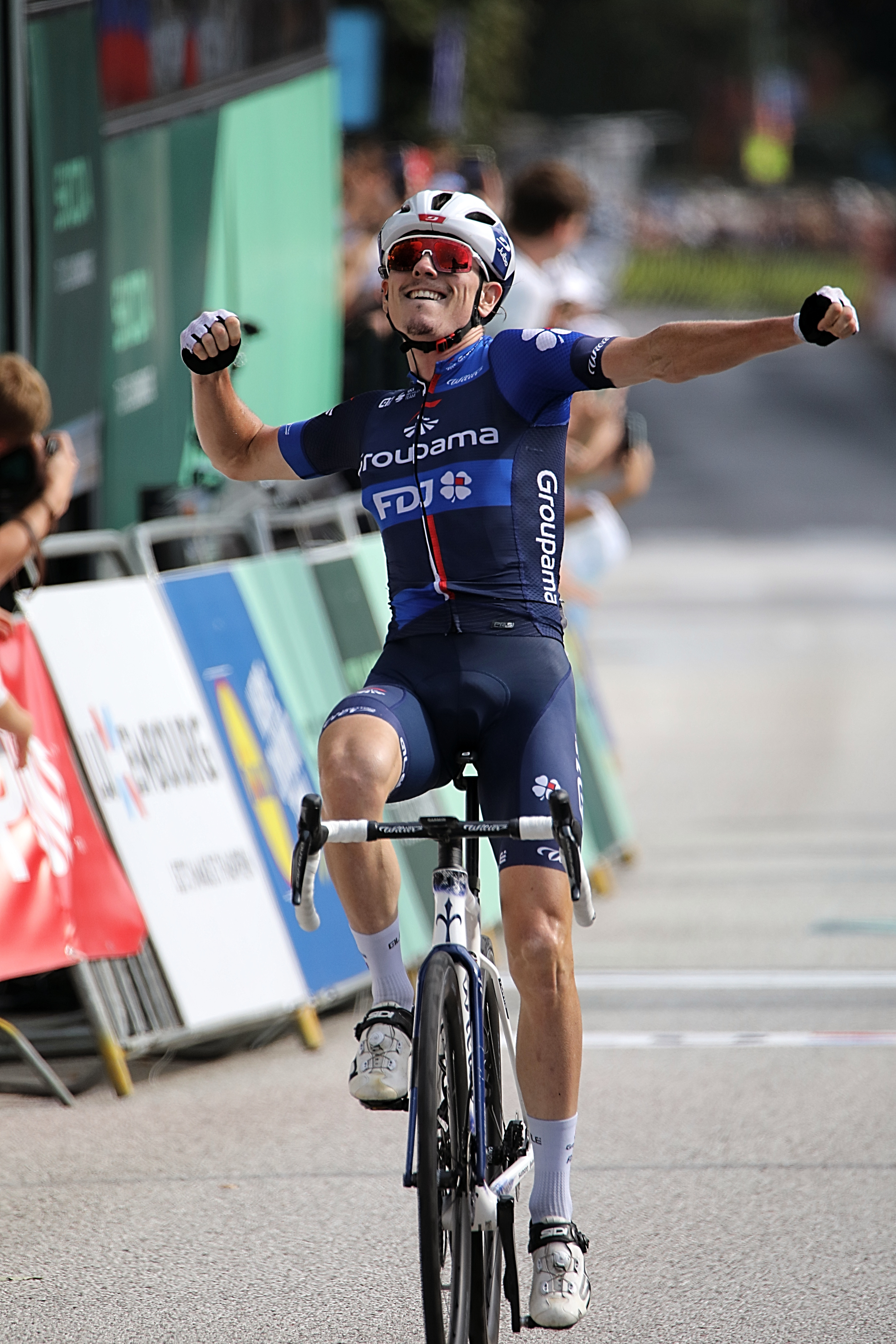
David Gaudu celebrating after winning the Tour de Luxembourg 2024

Gaudu took part in the 2025 Vuelta a España. He won Stage 3 of the race, marking his first Grand Tour win in five years, and leaving him level on time with Jonas Vingegaard who was in the red jersey at the end of the stage. The next stage, he finished ahead of Vingegaard in the bunch, moving him into the red jersey. Vingegaard moved back into the jersey on the following stage.

== Major results ==
2014
1st Overall Aubel–Thimister–La Gleize

1st Stage 3

6th Overall Ronde des Vallées
2016
1st Overall Tour de l'Avenir

1st Stage 6

1st Overall Course de la Paix U23

1st Points classification
1st Stage 2

3rd Road race, National Amateur Road Championships
5th Overall Tour de l'Ain
9th Grand Prix de Plumelec-Morbihan
2017 (1 pro win)
2nd Overall Tour de l'Ain

1st Young rider classification
1st Stage 3

2nd Boucles de l'Aulne
4th Route Adélie
5th Milano–Torino
7th Tour du Finistère
9th La Flèche Wallonne
2018
2nd Memorial Marco Pantani
5th Classic Sud-Ardèche
9th Overall Tour La Provence
2019 (1)
3rd Overall UAE Tour

1st Young rider classification

4th Gran Premio Bruno Beghelli
5th Overall Tour de Romandie

1st Young rider classification
1st Stage 3

5th Milano–Torino
6th Overall Tour La Provence

1st Young rider classification

6th Liège–Bastogne–Liège
2020 (2)
4th Overall UAE Tour
8th Overall Vuelta a España

1st Stages 11 & 17

10th Overall Tour de la Provence
2021 (3)
1st Ardèche Classic
3rd Liège–Bastogne–Liège
5th Overall Tour of the Basque Country

1st Stage 6

5th Tour du Jura
6th Overall Tour des Alpes-Maritimes et du Var

1st Young rider classification

6th Overall Tour de Luxembourg

1st Stage 5

6th Milano–Torino
7th Road race, Olympic Games
7th Giro di Lombardia
7th La Flèche Wallonne
8th Tre Valli Varesine
9th Overall Critérium du Dauphiné

1st Young rider classification

Combativity award Stage 18 Tour de France
2022 (2)
1st Stage 3 Critérium du Dauphiné
3rd Mercan'Tour Classic
4th Overall Tour de France
5th Overall Volta ao Algarve

1st Stage 2

5th Grand Prix Cycliste de Montréal
2023
2nd Overall Paris–Nice
2nd Ardèche Classic
4th Overall Tour of the Basque Country
4th La Drôme Classic
7th Overall Tour des Alpes-Maritimes et du Var

1st Mountains classification

9th Overall Tour de France
2024 (2)
1st Tour du Jura
3rd Overall Tour de Luxembourg

1st Stage 5

3rd Classic Grand Besançon Doubs
4th Route Adélie
6th Overall Vuelta a España
6th Classic Var
9th Giro di Lombardia
2025 (2)
Vuelta a España

1st Stage 3
Held after Stage 4

3rd Overall Tour of Oman

1st Stage 3

=== General classification results timeline ===
Grand Tour general classification results
Grand Tour	2017	2018	2019	2020	2021	2022	2023	2024	2025
Giro d'Italia	—	—	—	—	—	—	—	—	66
Tour de France	—	34	13	DNF	11	4	9	65	—
Vuelta a España	—	—	—	8	—	—	—	6	97
Major stage race general classification results
Race	2017	2018	2019	2020	2021	2022	2023	2024	2025
Paris–Nice	—	—	—	—	DNF	DNF	2	DNF	—
Tirreno–Adriatico	—	—	—	—	—	—	—	—	DNF
Volta a Catalunya	38	12	—	NH	—	—	—	—	—
Tour of the Basque Country	—	—	18	NH	5	18	4	DNF	—
Tour de Romandie	39	20	5	NH	—	—	—	14	30
Critérium du Dauphiné	DNF	45	40	—	9	17	30	15	—
Tour de Suisse	—	—	—	NH	—	—	—	—	—

Legend
—	Did not compete
DNF	Did not finish
