= Pau Miquel =

Spanish cyclist (born 2000)

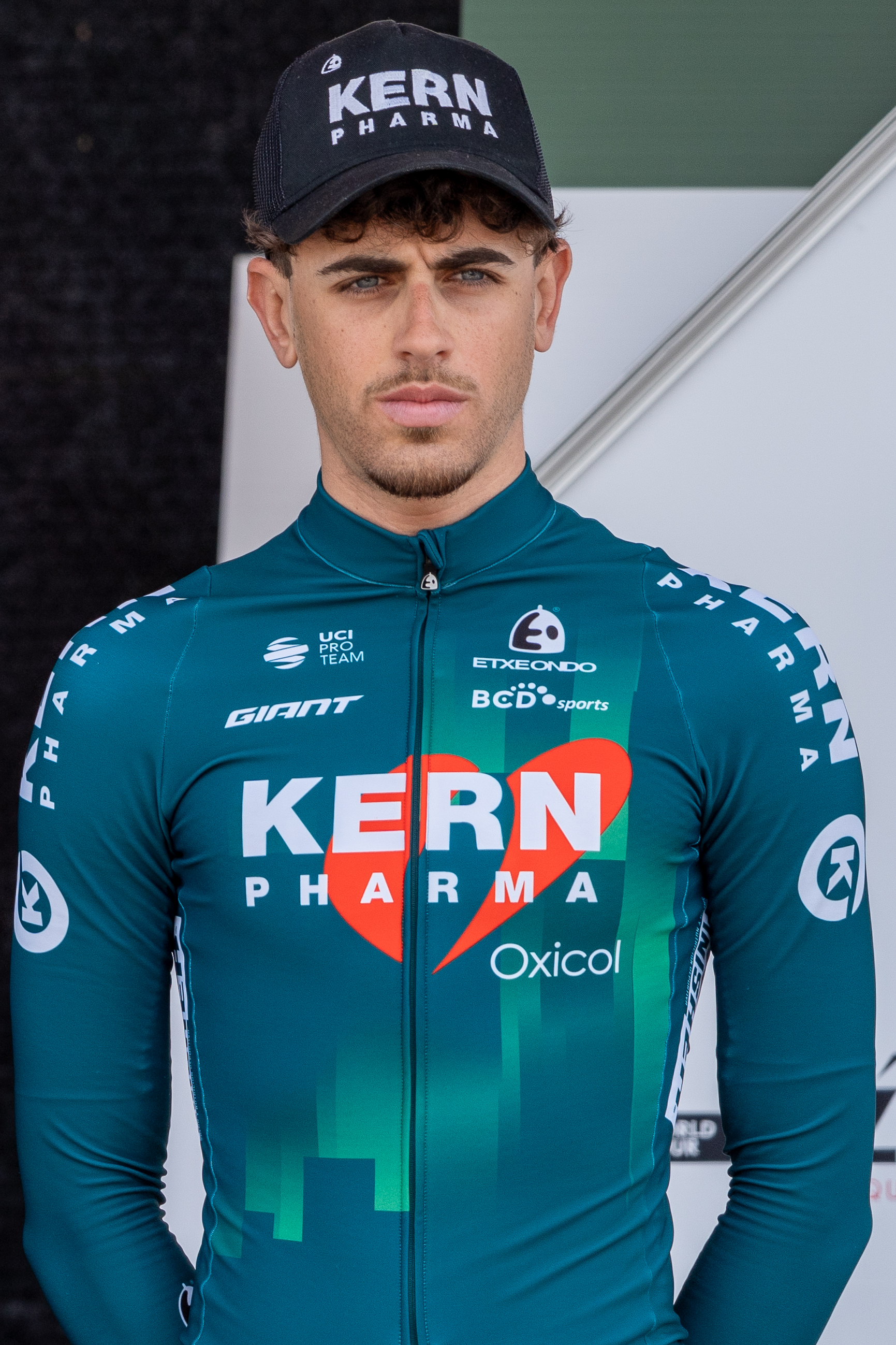
- Miquel in 2024

Personal information
- Full name: Pau Miquel Delgado
- Born: 20 August 2000 (age 26) Sant Quirze del Vallès, Spain
- Height: 1.80 m (5 ft 11 in)
- Weight: 60 kg (132 lb)

Cycling career
- Sport: Cycling
- Current team: Team Bahrain Victorious
- Discipline: Road
- Role: Rider
- Rider type: Climber

Amateur team
- 2019–2021: Lizarte

Professional teams
- 2021: Equipo Kern Pharma (stagiaire)
- 2022–2025: Equipo Kern Pharma
- 2026–: Team Bahrain Victorious

Pau Miquel Delgado (born 20 August 2000) is a Spanish cyclist who currently rides for UCI World Tour team Team Bahrain Victorious.

== Career ==
Miquel turned professional with the UCI ProTeam Equipo Kern Pharma in 2022 after spending three years at its feeder team. During Stage 5 of the 2022 Adriatica Ionica Race Miquel finished second in the breakaway behind Christian Scaroni.

Miquel rode in the 2022 Vuelta a España for the Equipo Kern Pharma. During Stage 3 Miquel made it into the break of the day staying away for 175 kilomtres, he was awarded the Combativity award for being most active during the stage and started stage 4 with a yellow number.

Miquel also rode in the 2024 Vuelta a España. There he managed to four times finish in the top five on a stage, with third place on stage 18 being his best result.

Miquel signed with Team Bahrain Victorious in late 2025 for the 2026 and 2027 seasons.

== Major results ==
2017
3rd Time trial, National Junior Road Championships
2021
1st Memorial Valenciaga
1st Mémorial Pascual Momparler
2nd Santikutz Klasika
2022
Combativity award Stage 3 Vuelta a España
2023
9th Prueba Villafranca de Ordizia
2024
3rd Prueba Villafranca de Ordizia
5th Grand Prix La Marseillaise
7th Circuit Franco-Belge
7th Gran Premio Castellón
10th Grand Prix Criquielion
2025
3rd Trofeo Matteotti
5th Grand Prix du Morbihan
5th Boucles de l'Aulne
5th Clásica Terres de l'Ebre
6th Circuito de Getxo
8th Coppa Sabatini
9th Grand Prix La Marseillaise
10th GP Miguel Induráin
2026
2nd Antwerp Port Epic
2nd Circuito de Getxo
2nd Gran Premio Castellón

=== Grand Tour general classification results timeline ===
Grand Tour	2022	2023	2024	2025	2026
Giro d'Italia	—	—	—	—	—
Tour de France	—	—	—	—	—
Vuelta a España	DNF	—	58	—	IP

Legend
—	Did not compete
DNF	Did not finish
