= Carlos Rodríguez (cyclist) =

Spanish cyclist (born 2001)

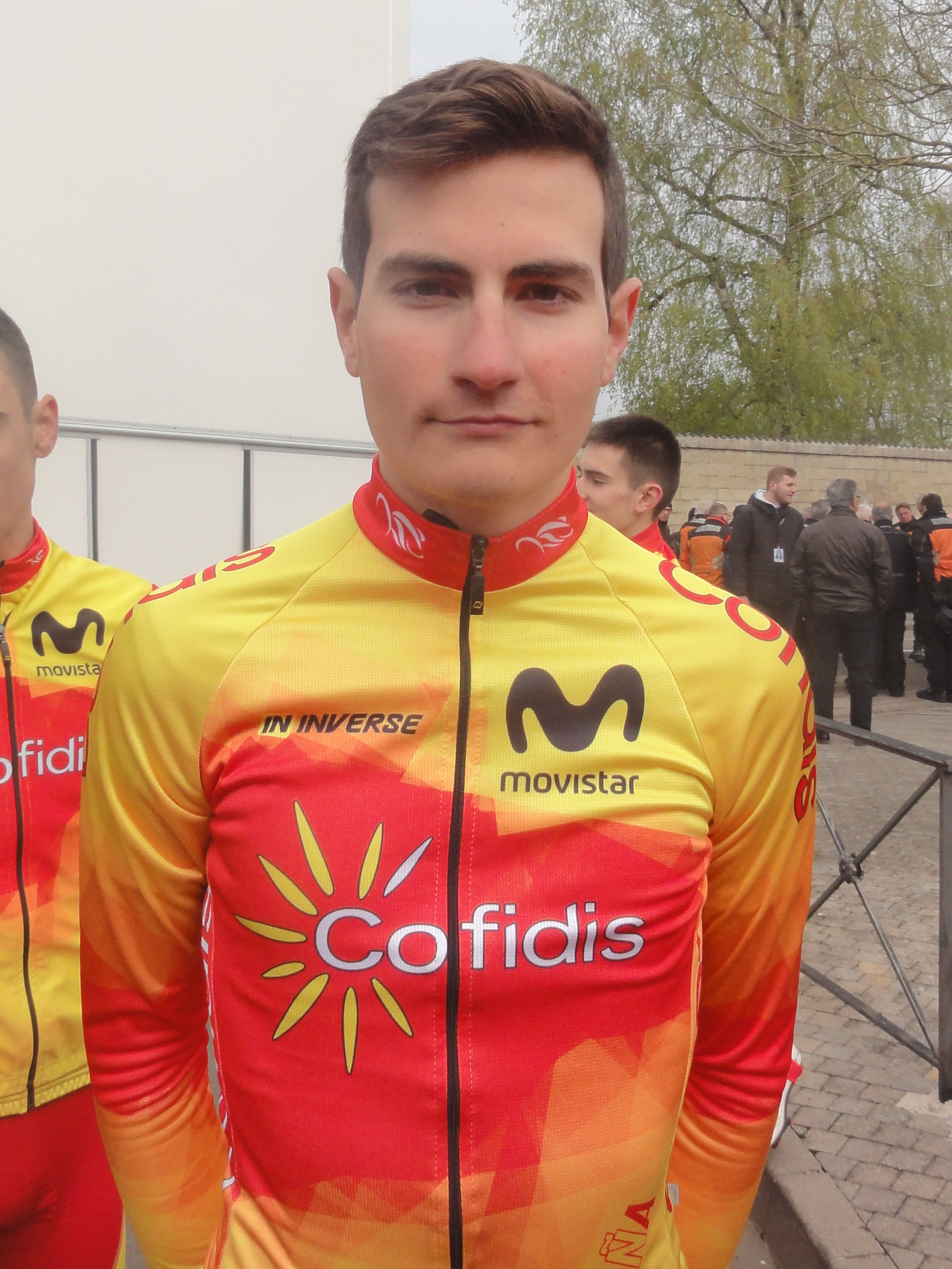
- Rodríguez at the start of the 2019 Paris–Roubaix Juniors

Personal information
- Full name: Carlos Rodríguez Cano
- Nickname: El león de Almuñécar (Almuñécar’s lion)
- Born: 2 February 2001 (age 25) Almuñécar, Spain
- Height: 1.83 m (6 ft 0 in)
- Weight: 67 kg (148 lb)

Cycling career
- Sport: Cycling
- Current team: Netcompany–Ineos
- Discipline: Road
- Role: Rider
- Rider type: All-rounder; Climber

Amateur team
- 2018–2019: Kometa U19

Professional team
- 2020–: Team INEOS

Major wins
- Grand Tours Tour de France 1 individual stage (2023) Stage races Tour de Romandie (2024) One-day races and Classics National Road Race Championships (2022)

Carlos Rodríguez Cano (born 2 February 2001) is a Spanish cyclist who currently rides for UCI WorldTeam Netcompany–Ineos.

== Career ==
Prior to being a road cyclist, Rodríguez was a BMX rider for the Spanish national team.

For his junior years in 2018 and 2019, Rodríguez raced for the Kometa development team run by former cyclist Alberto Contador. During these two seasons, he was a two-time national junior time trial champion and won the Tour de Gironde and the Gipuzkoa Klasika in 2019. He was also the bronze medalist at the 2018 European Junior Road Race Championships.

In 2020, he was recruited by UCI WorldTeam Team INEOS at only 18 years old on a four-year contract, while simultaneously working on an engineering degree.

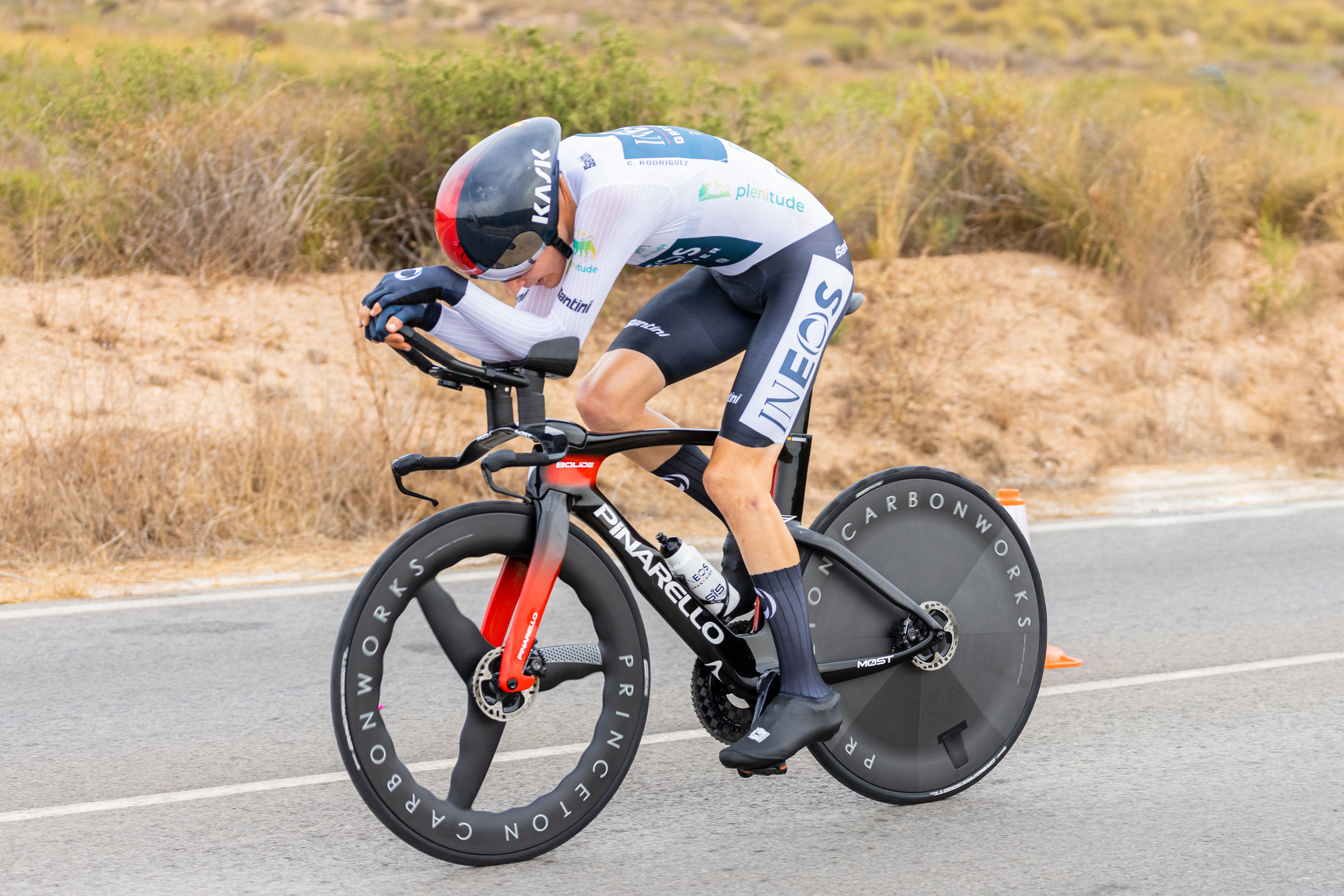
Rodriguez wearing the White Jersey at the 2022 Vuelta a España

In 2021, he finished second at the Tour de l'Avenir and fourth at the Vuelta a Andalucía. The following year, he took his first senior-level wins, being crowned the elite national road race champion in addition to winning stage five of the Tour of the Basque Country. In August, he was selected for his first Grand Tour, the Vuelta a España, finishing 7th overall. In his final race of the season in October, he placed fifth in his first Monument, the Giro di Lombardia.

In March 2023, he crashed in Strade Bianche and sustained a clavicle fracture. In June, he returned to racing, placing ninth at the Critérium du Dauphiné. He next rode in the Tour de France, where he finished fifth overall in the general classification and won stage 14 ahead of Tadej Pogačar and Jonas Vingegaard.

In April 2024, he won the final stage and finished second overall at the Tour of the Basque Country, being the only rider able to follow Juan Ayuso up the final climb. Later that month, he won the Tour de Romandie, his first major stage race win, after taking the lead on stage four. He rode in the 2024 Tour de France.

== Major results ==
2018
1st Time trial, National Junior Road Championships
UEC European Road Championships

3rd Road race
7th Time trial

4th Overall Tour de Gironde

1st Points classification
1st Young rider classification
1st Stage 1 (TTT)

5th Overall Trophée Centre Morbihan

1st Stage 2b

6th Paris–Roubaix Juniors
2019
1st Time trial, National Junior Road Championships
1st Overall Tour de Gironde

1st Points classification

1st Gipuzkoa Klasika
6th Overall Trophée Centre Morbihan
2021
2nd Overall Tour de l'Avenir

1st Mountains classification
1st Young rider classification
1st Stage 9

3rd Time trial, National Road Championships
4th Overall Vuelta a Andalucía
7th GP Industria & Artigianato di Larciano
10th Overall Tour of Britain

1st Stage 3 (TTT)

2022 (2 pro wins)
National Road Championships

1st Road race
4th Time trial

1st Stage 5 Tour of the Basque Country
2nd Overall Route d'Occitanie

1st Young rider classification

3rd Overall Volta a la Comunitat Valenciana
4th Overall Vuelta a Burgos

1st Young rider classification

4th Overall Vuelta a Andalucía
5th Giro di Lombardia
5th Clásica de San Sebastián
5th Trofeo Laigueglia
7th Overall Vuelta a España
2023 (2)
4th Overall Vuelta a Andalucía
5th Overall Tour de France

1st Stage 14

7th Giro di Lombardia
9th Overall Critérium du Dauphiné

1st Young rider classification

9th Tre Valli Varesine
10th Overall Tour of Britain

1st Stage 8

10th Overall Volta a la Comunitat Valenciana
2024 (3)
1st Overall Tour de Romandie

1st Young rider classification

2nd Overall Tour of the Basque Country

1st Stage 6

4th Overall Critérium du Dauphiné

1st Stage 8

7th Overall Tour de France
10th Overall Vuelta a España

Held after Stages 11–14 & 16–18

2025
6th Overall Tour de Romandie
6th Overall Volta a la Comunitat Valenciana

1st Young rider classification

9th Overall Critérium du Dauphiné
2026
1st Stage 3 (TTT) Paris–Nice
2nd Overall Tour de la Provence
4th Overall Tour of Austria

=== General classification results timeline ===
Grand Tour general classification results
Grand Tour	2021	2022	2023	2024	2025	2026
Giro d'Italia	—	—	—	—	—	—
Tour de France	—	—	5	7	DNF	
Vuelta a España	—	7	—	10	—	
Major stage race general classification results
Major stage race	2021	2022	2023	2024	2025	2026
Paris–Nice	—	—	—	28	—	23
Tirreno–Adriatico	—	—	—	—	—	—
Volta a Catalunya	—	15	—	—	—	26
Tour of the Basque Country	—	26	—	2	—	—
Tour de Romandie	—	—	—	1	6	12
Critérium du Dauphiné	33	—	9	4	9	
Tour de Suisse	—	—	—	—	—	

Legend
—	Did not compete
DNF	Did not finish
