= 2022 Tour of the Basque Country =

Spanish cycling race

2022 UCI World Tour, race 13 of 32

Race details
- Dates: 4–9 April 2022
- Stages: 6
- Distance: 882.20 km (548.17 mi)
- Winning time: 21h 59' 36"

Results
Jersey awarded to the overall winner	Winner	Daniel Martínez (COL)	(INEOS Grenadiers)
	Second	Ion Izagirre (ESP)	(Cofidis)
	Third	Aleksandr Vlasov^{[a]}	(Bora–Hansgrohe)
Jersey awarded to the points classification winner	Points	Daniel Martínez (COL)	(INEOS Grenadiers)
Jersey awarded to the mountains classification winner	Mountains	Cristián Rodríguez (ESP)	(Team TotalEnergies)
Jersey awarded to the young rider classification winner	Young rider	Remco Evenepoel (BEL)	(Quick-Step Alpha Vinyl Team)
Jersey awarded to the team classification winner	Team	INEOS Grenadiers	

The 2022 Tour of the Basque Country (officially known as Itzulia Basque Country 2022) was a road cycling stage race held between 4 and 9 April 2022 in the titular region in northern Spain. It was the 61st edition of the Tour of the Basque Country and the 13th race of the 2022 UCI World Tour.

== Teams ==
All 18 UCI WorldTeams and five UCI ProTeams made up the 23 teams that participated in the race. All but five teams entered a full squad of seven riders; Bora–Hansgrohe, EF Education–EasyPost, Israel–Premier Tech, Lotto–Soudal, and Quick-Step Alpha Vinyl Team entered six riders each. With one late non-starter, AG2R Citroën Team was also reduced to six riders. In total, 155 riders started the race, of which only 54 finished; there were 25 riders who did not finish the last stage, while a further 39 riders finished over the time limit on the final stage.

UCI WorldTeams

- AG2R Citroën Team
- Astana Qazaqstan Team
- Bora–Hansgrohe
- Cofidis
- Quick-Step Alpha Vinyl Team
- EF Education–EasyPost
- Groupama–FDJ
- INEOS Grenadiers
- Intermarché–Wanty–Gobert Matériaux
- Israel–Premier Tech
- Lotto–Soudal
- Movistar Team
- Team Bahrain Victorious
- Team BikeExchange–Jayco
- Team DSM
- Team Jumbo–Visma
- Trek–Segafredo
- UAE Team Emirates

UCI ProTeams

- Burgos BH
- Caja Rural–Seguros RGA
- Equipo Kern Pharma
- Euskaltel–Euskadi
- Team TotalEnergies

== Route ==
Stage characteristics and winners
Stage	Date	Course	Distance	Type	Winner
1	4 April	Hondarribia to Hondarribia	7.51 km (4.67 mi)	Individual time trial	Primož Roglič (SLO)
2	5 April	Leitza to Viana	207.92 km (129.20 mi)	Hilly stage	Julian Alaphilippe (FRA)
3	6 April	Laudio to Amurrio	181.72 km (112.92 mi)	Hilly stage	Pello Bilbao (ESP)
4	7 April	Vitoria-Gasteiz to Ingeteam Parke Zamudio	185.60 km (115.33 mi)	Hilly stage	Daniel Martínez (COL)
5	8 April	Ingeteam Parke Zamudio to Mallabia	163.76 km (101.76 mi)	Mountain stage	Carlos Rodríguez (ESP)
6	9 April	Eibar to Arrate	135.69 km (84.31 mi)	Mountain stage	Ion Izagirre (ESP)
Total			882.20 km (548.17 mi)		

== Stages ==
=== Stage 1 ===
4 April 2022 — Hondarribia to Hondarribia, 7.51 km (4.67 mi) (ITT)

Stage 1 Result (1–10)
Rank	Rider	Team	Time
1	Primož Roglič (SLO)	Team Jumbo–Visma	9' 48"
2	Remco Evenepoel (BEL)	Quick-Step Alpha Vinyl Team	+ 5"
3	Rémi Cavagna (FRA)	Quick-Step Alpha Vinyl Team	+ 16"
4	Geraint Thomas (GBR)	INEOS Grenadiers	+ 18"
5	Adam Yates (GBR)	INEOS Grenadiers	+ 18"
6	Aleksandr Vlasov^{[a]}	Bora–Hansgrohe	+ 18"
7	Bruno Armirail (FRA)	Groupama–FDJ	+ 20"
8	Ion Izagirre (ESP)	Cofidis	+ 20"
9	Jonas Vingegaard (DEN)	Team Jumbo–Visma	+ 20"
10	Ben Tulett (GBR)	INEOS Grenadiers	+ 21"

General classification after Stage 1 (1–10)
Rank	Rider	Team	Time
1	Primož Roglič (SLO)	Team Jumbo–Visma	9' 48"
2	Remco Evenepoel (BEL)	Quick-Step Alpha Vinyl Team	+ 5"
3	Rémi Cavagna (FRA)	Quick-Step Alpha Vinyl Team	+ 16"
4	Geraint Thomas (GBR)	INEOS Grenadiers	+ 18"
5	Adam Yates (GBR)	INEOS Grenadiers	+ 18"
6	Aleksandr Vlasov^{[a]}	Bora–Hansgrohe	+ 18"
7	Bruno Armirail (FRA)	Groupama–FDJ	+ 20"
8	Ion Izagirre (ESP)	Cofidis	+ 20"
9	Jonas Vingegaard (DEN)	Team Jumbo–Visma	+ 20"
10	Ben Tulett (GBR)	INEOS Grenadiers	+ 21"

=== Stage 2 ===
5 April 2022 — Leitza to Viana, 207.92 km (129.20 mi)

Stage 2 Result (1–10)
Rank	Rider	Team	Time
1	Julian Alaphilippe (FRA)	Quick-Step Alpha Vinyl Team	5h 04' 35"
2	Fabien Doubey (FRA)	Team TotalEnergies	+ 0"
3	Quinten Hermans (BEL)	Intermarché–Wanty–Gobert Matériaux	+ 0"
4	Hugo Houle (CAN)	Israel–Premier Tech	+ 0"
5	Orluis Aular (VEN)	Caja Rural–Seguros RGA	+ 0"
6	Gotzon Martín (ESP)	Euskaltel–Euskadi	+ 0"
7	Adam Yates (GBR)	INEOS Grenadiers	+ 0"
8	David Gaudu (FRA)	Groupama–FDJ	+ 0"
9	Remco Evenepoel (BEL)	Quick-Step Alpha Vinyl Team	+ 0"
10	Maxim Van Gils (BEL)	Lotto–Soudal	+ 0"

General classification after Stage 2 (1–10)
Rank	Rider	Team	Time
1	Primož Roglič (SLO)	Team Jumbo–Visma	5h 14' 23"
2	Remco Evenepoel (BEL)	Quick-Step Alpha Vinyl Team	+ 5"
3	Rémi Cavagna (FRA)	Quick-Step Alpha Vinyl Team	+ 16"
4	Geraint Thomas (GBR)	INEOS Grenadiers	+ 18"
5	Adam Yates (GBR)	INEOS Grenadiers	+ 18"
6	Aleksandr Vlasov^{[a]}	Bora–Hansgrohe	+ 18"
7	Bruno Armirail (FRA)	Groupama–FDJ	+ 20"
8	Ion Izagirre (ESP)	Cofidis	+ 20"
9	Jonas Vingegaard (DEN)	Team Jumbo–Visma	+ 20"
10	Ben Tulett (GBR)	INEOS Grenadiers	+ 21"

=== Stage 3 ===
6 April 2022 — Laudio to Amurrio, 181.72 km (112.92 mi)

Stage 3 Result (1–10)
Rank	Rider	Team	Time
1	Pello Bilbao (ESP)	Team Bahrain Victorious	4h 35' 24"
2	Julian Alaphilippe (FRA)	Quick-Step Alpha Vinyl Team	+ 0"
3	Aleksandr Vlasov^{[a]}	Bora–Hansgrohe	+ 0"
4	David Gaudu (FRA)	Groupama–FDJ	+ 0"
5	Enric Mas (ESP)	Movistar Team	+ 0"
6	Pierre Latour (FRA)	Team TotalEnergies	+ 0"
7	Primož Roglič (SLO)	Team Jumbo–Visma	+ 0"
8	Ion Izagirre (ESP)	Cofidis	+ 0"
9	Jonas Vingegaard (DEN)	Team Jumbo–Visma	+ 0"
10	Rigoberto Urán (COL)	EF Education–EasyPost	+ 0"

General classification after Stage 3 (1–10)
Rank	Rider	Team	Time
1	Primož Roglič (SLO)	Team Jumbo–Visma	9h 49' 47"
2	Remco Evenepoel (BEL)	Quick-Step Alpha Vinyl Team	+ 5"
3	Aleksandr Vlasov^{[a]}	Bora–Hansgrohe	+ 14"
4	Adam Yates (GBR)	INEOS Grenadiers	+ 18"
5	Pello Bilbao (ESP)	Team Bahrain Victorious	+ 19"
6	Jonas Vingegaard (DEN)	Team Jumbo–Visma	+ 19"
7	Ion Izagirre (ESP)	Cofidis	+ 20"
8	Daniel Martínez (COL)	INEOS Grenadiers	+ 21"
9	Pierre Latour (FRA)	Team TotalEnergies	+ 25"
10	Julian Alaphilippe (FRA)	Quick-Step Alpha Vinyl Team	+ 28"

=== Stage 4 ===
7 April 2022 — Vitoria-Gasteiz to Ingeteam Parke Zamudio, 185.60 km (115.33 mi)

Stage 4 Result (1–10)
Rank	Rider	Team	Time
1	Daniel Martínez (COL)	INEOS Grenadiers	4h 15' 23"
2	Julian Alaphilippe (FRA)	Quick-Step Alpha Vinyl Team	+ 0"
3	Diego Ulissi (ITA)	UAE Team Emirates	+ 0"
4	Primož Roglič (SLO)	Team Jumbo–Visma	+ 0"
5	Pello Bilbao (ESP)	Team Bahrain Victorious	+ 0"
6	Orluis Aular (VEN)	Caja Rural–Seguros RGA	+ 0"
7	Ruben Guerreiro (POR)	EF Education–EasyPost	+ 0"
8	Rudy Molard (FRA)	Groupama–FDJ	+ 0"
9	Aleksandr Vlasov^{[a]}	Bora–Hansgrohe	+ 0"
10	Gianluca Brambilla (ITA)	Trek–Segafredo	+ 0"

General classification after Stage 4 (1–10)
Rank	Rider	Team	Time
1	Primož Roglič (SLO)	Team Jumbo–Visma	14h 05' 10"
2	Remco Evenepoel (BEL)	Quick-Step Alpha Vinyl Team	+ 5"
3	Daniel Martínez (COL)	INEOS Grenadiers	+ 11"
4	Aleksandr Vlasov^{[a]}	Bora–Hansgrohe	+ 14"
5	Adam Yates (GBR)	INEOS Grenadiers	+ 18"
6	Pello Bilbao (ESP)	Team Bahrain Victorious	+ 19"
7	Jonas Vingegaard (DEN)	Team Jumbo–Visma	+ 19"
8	Ion Izagirre (ESP)	Cofidis	+ 20"
9	Julian Alaphilippe (FRA)	Quick-Step Alpha Vinyl Team	+ 22"
10	David Gaudu (FRA)	Groupama–FDJ	+ 32"

=== Stage 5 ===
8 April 2022 — Ingeteam Parke Zamudio to Mallabia, 163.76 km (101.76 mi)

Stage 5 Result (1–10)
Rank	Rider	Team	Time
1	Carlos Rodríguez (ESP)	INEOS Grenadiers	4h 07' 09"
2	Daniel Martínez (COL)	INEOS Grenadiers	+ 7"
3	Remco Evenepoel (BEL)	Quick-Step Alpha Vinyl Team	+ 9"
4	Ion Izagirre (ESP)	Cofidis	+ 11"
5	Enric Mas (ESP)	Movistar Team	+ 11"
6	Pello Bilbao (ESP)	Team Bahrain Victorious	+ 11"
7	Aleksandr Vlasov^{[a]}	Bora–Hansgrohe	+ 18"
8	Jonas Vingegaard (DEN)	Team Jumbo–Visma	+ 20"
9	Marc Soler (ESP)	UAE Team Emirates	+ 38"
10	Fernando Barceló (ESP)	Caja Rural–Seguros RGA	+ 1' 07"

General classification after Stage 5 (1–10)
Rank	Rider	Team	Time
1	Remco Evenepoel (BEL)	Quick-Step Alpha Vinyl Team	18h 12' 29"
2	Daniel Martínez (COL)	INEOS Grenadiers	+ 2"
3	Pello Bilbao (ESP)	Team Bahrain Victorious	+ 20"
4	Ion Izagirre (ESP)	Cofidis	+ 21"
5	Aleksandr Vlasov^{[a]}	Bora–Hansgrohe	+ 22"
6	Jonas Vingegaard (DEN)	Team Jumbo–Visma	+ 29"
7	Enric Mas (ESP)	Movistar Team	+ 37"
8	Primož Roglič (SLO)	Team Jumbo–Visma	+ 1' 05"
9	Adam Yates (GBR)	INEOS Grenadiers	+ 1' 15"
10	Marc Soler (ESP)	UAE Team Emirates	+ 1' 30"

=== Stage 6 ===
9 April 2022 — Eibar to Arrate, 135.69 km (84.31 mi)

Stage 6 Result (1–10)
Rank	Rider	Team	Time
1	Ion Izagirre (ESP)	Cofidis	3h 47' 07"
2	Aleksandr Vlasov^{[a]}	Bora–Hansgrohe	+ 0"
3	Marc Soler (ESP)	UAE Team Emirates	+ 0"
4	Daniel Martínez (COL)	INEOS Grenadiers	+ 0"
5	Jonas Vingegaard (DEN)	Team Jumbo–Visma	+ 3"
6	Pello Bilbao (ESP)	Team Bahrain Victorious	+ 13"
7	Remco Evenepoel (BEL)	Quick-Step Alpha Vinyl Team	+ 24"
8	Juan Pedro López (ESP)	Trek–Segafredo	+ 52"
9	Davide Formolo (ITA)	UAE Team Emirates	+ 1' 29"
10	Felix Gall (AUT)	AG2R Citroën Team	+ 1' 41"

General classification after Stage 6 (1–10)
Rank	Rider	Team	Time
1	Daniel Martínez (COL)	INEOS Grenadiers	21h 59' 36"
2	Ion Izagirre (ESP)	Cofidis	+ 11"
3	Aleksandr Vlasov^{[a]}	Bora–Hansgrohe	+ 16"
4	Remco Evenepoel (BEL)	Quick-Step Alpha Vinyl Team	+ 21"
5	Pello Bilbao (ESP)	Team Bahrain Victorious	+ 32"
6	Jonas Vingegaard (DEN)	Team Jumbo–Visma	+ 32"
7	Marc Soler (ESP)	UAE Team Emirates	+ 1' 26"
8	Primož Roglič (SLO)	Team Jumbo–Visma	+ 3' 18"
9	Enric Mas (ESP)	Movistar Team	+ 3' 55"
10	Rigoberto Urán (COL)	EF Education–EasyPost	+ 5' 03"

== Classification leadership table ==
Classification leadership by stage
Stage	Winner	General classification	Points classification	Mountains classification	Young rider classification	Basque rider classification	Team classification	Combativity award
1	Primož Roglič	Primož Roglič	Primož Roglič	Remco Evenepoel	Remco Evenepoel	Ion Izagirre	Quick-Step Alpha Vinyl Team	No award
2	Julian Alaphilippe	Primož Roglič	Primož Roglič	Ibon Ruiz	Remco Evenepoel	Ion Izagirre	Quick-Step Alpha Vinyl Team	Ibon Ruiz
3	Pello Bilbao	Primož Roglič	Julian Alaphilippe	Cristián Rodríguez	Remco Evenepoel	Pello Bilbao	Team Jumbo–Visma	Cristián Rodríguez
4	Daniel Martínez	Primož Roglič	Julian Alaphilippe	Cristián Rodríguez	Remco Evenepoel	Pello Bilbao	INEOS Grenadiers	Victor Lafay
5	Carlos Rodríguez	Remco Evenepoel	Julian Alaphilippe	Cristián Rodríguez	Remco Evenepoel	Pello Bilbao	INEOS Grenadiers	Marc Soler
6	Ion Izagirre	Daniel Martínez	Daniel Martínez	Cristián Rodríguez	Remco Evenepoel	Ion Izagirre	INEOS Grenadiers	Ion Izagirre
Final		Daniel Martínez	Daniel Martínez	Cristián Rodríguez	Remco Evenepoel	Ion Izagirre	INEOS Grenadiers	Not awarded

- On stage 2, Geraint Thomas, who was fourth in the points classification, wore the green jersey, because first-placed Primož Roglič wore the yellow jersey as the leader of the general classification, second-placed Remco Evenepoel wore the polka-dot jersey as the leader of the mountains classification, and third-placed Rémi Cavagna wore the French national champion's jersey as the defending French national road race champion.
- On stage 2, Ben Tulett, who was second in the young rider classification, wore the blue jersey, because first-placed Remco Evenepoel wore the polka-dot jersey as the leader of the mountains classification.
- On stage 3, Adam Yates, who was fourth in the points classification, wore the green jersey, because first-placed Primož Roglič wore the yellow jersey as the leader of the general classification, second-placed Remco Evenepoel wore the blue jersey as the leader of the young rider classification, and third-placed Julian Alaphilippe wore the world champion's jersey as the defending world road race champion.
- On stage 6, Felix Gall, who was second in the young rider classification, wore the blue jersey, because first-placed Remco Evenepoel wore the yellow jersey as the leader of the general classification.

== Final classification standings ==
Legend
Denotes the winner of the general classification	Denotes the winner of the young rider classification
Denotes the winner of the points classification	Denotes the winner of the team classification
Denotes the winner of the mountains classification	Denotes the winner of the combativity award

=== General classification ===
Final general classification (1–10)
Rank	Rider	Team	Time
1	Daniel Martínez (COL)	INEOS Grenadiers	21h 59' 36"
2	Ion Izagirre (ESP)	Cofidis	+ 11"
3	Aleksandr Vlasov^{[a]}	Bora–Hansgrohe	+ 16"
4	Remco Evenepoel (BEL)	Quick-Step Alpha Vinyl Team	+ 21"
5	Pello Bilbao (ESP)	Team Bahrain Victorious	+ 32"
6	Jonas Vingegaard (DEN)	Team Jumbo–Visma	+ 32"
7	Marc Soler (ESP)	UAE Team Emirates	+ 1' 26"
8	Primož Roglič (SLO)	Team Jumbo–Visma	+ 3' 18"
9	Enric Mas (ESP)	Movistar Team	+ 3' 55"
10	Rigoberto Urán (COL)	EF Education–EasyPost	+ 5' 03"

=== Points classification ===
Final points classification (1–10)
Rank	Rider	Team	Points
1	Daniel Martínez (COL)	INEOS Grenadiers	74
2	Julian Alaphilippe (FRA)	Quick-Step Alpha Vinyl Team	65
3	Remco Evenepoel (BEL)	Quick-Step Alpha Vinyl Team	65
4	Aleksandr Vlasov^{[a]}	Bora–Hansgrohe	62
5	Pello Bilbao (ESP)	Team Bahrain Victorious	61
6	Ion Izagirre (ESP)	Cofidis	57
7	Primož Roglič (SLO)	Team Jumbo–Visma	56
8	Marc Soler (ESP)	UAE Team Emirates	45
9	Jonas Vingegaard (DEN)	Team Jumbo–Visma	38
10	Carlos Rodríguez (ESP)	INEOS Grenadiers	37

=== Mountains classification ===
Final mountains classification (1–10)
Rank	Rider	Team	Points
1	Cristián Rodríguez (ESP)	Team TotalEnergies	40
2	Davide Formolo (ITA)	UAE Team Emirates	38
3	Jonas Vingegaard (DEN)	Team Jumbo–Visma	17
4	Daniel Martínez (COL)	INEOS Grenadiers	12
5	Ibon Ruiz (ESP)	Equipo Kern Pharma	12
6	Marc Soler (ESP)	UAE Team Emirates	12
7	Carlos Rodríguez (ESP)	INEOS Grenadiers	10
8	Geraint Thomas (GBR)	INEOS Grenadiers	10
9	Tony Gallopin (FRA)	Trek–Segafredo	10
10	Ion Izagirre (ESP)	Cofidis	9

=== Young rider classification ===
Final young rider classification (1–10)
Rank	Rider	Team	Time
1	Remco Evenepoel (BEL)	Quick-Step Alpha Vinyl Team	21h 59' 57"
2	Juan Pedro López (ESP)	Trek–Segafredo	+ 5' 03"
3	Felix Gall (AUT)	AG2R Citroën Team	+ 5' 37"
4	Ben Tulett (GBR)	INEOS Grenadiers	+ 13' 04"
5	Carlos Rodríguez (ESP)	INEOS Grenadiers	+ 14' 41"
6	Andreas Leknessund (NOR)	Team DSM	+ 16' 17"
7	Igor Arrieta (ESP)	Equipo Kern Pharma	+ 23' 38"
8	Gino Mäder (SUI)	Team Bahrain Victorious	+ 29' 21"
9	Mauri Vansevenant (BEL)	Quick-Step Alpha Vinyl Team	+ 36' 33"
10	Ibon Ruiz (ESP)	Equipo Kern Pharma	+ 51' 00"

=== Basque rider classification ===
Final Basque rider classification (1–10)
Rank	Rider	Team	Time
1	Ion Izagirre (ESP)	Cofidis	21h 59' 47"
2	Pello Bilbao (ESP)	Team Bahrain Victorious	+ 21"
3	Jonathan Lastra (ESP)	Caja Rural–Seguros RGA	+ 8' 32"
4	Mikel Bizkarra (ESP)	Euskaltel–Euskadi	+ 12' 57"
5	Gorka Izagirre (ESP)	Movistar Team	+ 20' 12"
6	Igor Arrieta (ESP)	Equipo Kern Pharma	+ 23' 48"
7	Gotzon Martín (ESP)	Euskaltel–Euskadi	+ 30' 10"
8	Óscar Rodríguez (ESP)	Movistar Team	+ 40' 47"
9	Ibon Ruiz (ESP)	Equipo Kern Pharma	+ 51' 10"
10	Xabier Isasa (ESP)	Euskaltel–Euskadi	+ 1h 10' 23"

=== Team classification ===
Final team classification (1–10)
Rank	Team	Time
1	INEOS Grenadiers	66h 20' 44"
2	UAE Team Emirates	+ 1' 16"
3	Team Jumbo–Visma	+ 11' 25"
4	Team Bahrain Victorious	+ 11' 47"
5	Movistar Team	+ 13' 35"
6	Groupama–FDJ	+ 18' 16"
7	Trek–Segafredo	+ 22' 09"
8	Quick-Step Alpha Vinyl Team	+ 29' 24"
9	Cofidis	+ 31' 30"
10	Caja Rural–Seguros RGA	+ 32' 47"

== Notes ==
^{a} As of 1 March 2022, the UCI announced that cyclists from Russia and Belarus would no longer compete under the name or flag of those respective countries due to the Russian invasion of Ukraine.
