= 2024 Tour de Langkawi =

Malaysian cycling race

2024 UCI ProSeries

Race details
- Dates: 29 September – 6 October 2024
- Stages: 8
- Distance: 1,190 km (740 mi)
- Winning time: 26h 27' 44"

Results
Jersey awarded to the overall winner	Winner	Max Poole (GBR)	(Team dsm–firmenich PostNL)
	Second	Thomas Pesenti (ITA)	(JCL Team UKYO)
	Third	Unai Iribar (ESP)	(Equipo Kern Pharma)
Jersey awarded to the points classification winner	Points	Matteo Malucelli (ITA)	(JCL Team UKYO)
Jersey awarded to the mountains classification winner	Mountains	Mario Aparicio (ESP)	(Burgos BH)
	Team	(Spain) Equipo Kern Pharma	

The 2024 Tour de Langkawi (officially Petronas Le Tour de Langkawi 2024 for sponsorship reasons) was the 28th edition of the Tour de Langkawi road cycling stage race, which is part of the 2024 UCI ProSeries. It began on the 29th of September in Kuah and finished on the 6th of October in Bintulu.

== Teams ==
Three UCI WorldTeams, seven UCI ProTeams, nine UCI Continental teams and three national teams make up the twenty-two teams that will participate in the race.

UCI WorldTeams

- Astana Qazaqstan Team
- EF Education–EasyPost
- Team dsm–firmenich PostNL

UCI ProTeams

- Burgos BH
- Equipo Kern Pharma
- Euskaltel–Euskadi
- Polti–Kometa
- Team Corratec–Vini Fantini
- Tudor Pro Cycling Team
- VF Group–Bardiani–CSF–Faizanè

UCI Continental Teams

- Aisan Racing Team
- ARA Skip Capital
- Hengxiang Cycling Team
- HKSI Pro Cycling Team
- JCL Team UKYO
- Li-Ning Star
- Malaysia Pro Cycling
- Nusantara Cycling Team
- Terengganu Cycling Team

National Teams

- Malaysia
- Thailand
- Philippines

== Route ==
Stage characteristics and winners
Stage	Date	Course	Distance	Type	Stage winner
1	29 September	Kuah to Kuah	96.5 km (60.0 mi)	Flat stage	Gleb Syritsa
2	30 September	Arau to Butterworth	154.5 km (96.0 mi)	Flat stage	Matteo Malucelli (ITA)
3	1 October	Taiping to Cameron Highlands	170.3 km (105.8 mi)	Mountain stage	Max Poole (GBR)
4	2 October	Kuala Kubu Bharu to Bentong	131.2 km (81.5 mi)	Mountain stage	Arvid de Kleijn (NED)
5	3 October	Kuala Lumpur to Malacca City	167.3 km (104.0 mi)	Medium-mountain stage	Arvid de Kleijn (NED)
6	4 October	Batu Pahat to Kulai	123.4 km (76.7 mi)	Flat stage	Manuele Tarozzi (ITA)
7	5 October	Miri to Bintulu	199.3 km (123.8 mi)	Flat stage	Matteo Malucelli (ITA)
8	6 October	Bintulu to Bintulu	147.5 km (91.7 mi)	Flat stage	Matteo Malucelli (ITA)
Total			1,190 km (740 mi)		

== Stages ==
=== Stage 1 ===
29 September 2024 — Kuah to Kuah, 96.5 km (60.0 mi)

Stage 1 Result
Rank	Rider	Team	Time
1	Gleb Syritsa	Astana Qazaqstan Team	2h 04' 37"
2	Casper van Uden (NED)	Team dsm–firmenich PostNL	+ 0"
3	Lorenzo Conforti (ITA)	VF Group–Bardiani–CSF–Faizanè	+ 0"
4	Matteo Malucelli (ITA)	JCL Team UKYO	+ 0"
5	Arvid de Kleijn (NED)	Tudor Pro Cycling Team	+ 0"
6	Manuel Peñalver (ESP)	Polti–Kometa	+ 0"
7	Mohamad Izzat Hilmi Abdul Halil (MAS)	Malaysia Pro Cycling	+ 0"
8	Mattia Pinazzi (ITA)	VF Group–Bardiani–CSF–Faizanè	+ 0"
9	Miguel Ángel Fernández (ESP)	Equipo Kern Pharma	+ 0"
10	Blake Agnoletto (AUS)	ARA Skip Capital	+ 0"

General classification after Stage 1
Rank	Rider	Team	Time
1	Gleb Syritsa	Astana Qazaqstan Team	2h 04' 25"
2	Casper van Uden (NED)	Team dsm–firmenich PostNL	+ 6"
3	Xavier Cañellas (ESP)	Euskaltel–Euskadi	+ 6"
4	Lorenzo Conforti (ITA)	VF Group–Bardiani–CSF–Faizanè	+ 8"
5	Nur Aiman Rosli (MAS)	Terengganu Cycling Team	+ 8"
6	Tyler Tomkinson (AUS)	ARA Skip Capital	+ 8"
7	Thomas Pesenti (ITA)	JCL Team UKYO	+ 11"
8	Max Poole (GBR)	Team dsm–firmenich PostNL	+ 11"
9	Matteo Malucelli (ITA)	JCL Team UKYO	+ 12"
10	Arvid de Kleijn (NED)	Tudor Pro Cycling Team	+ 10"

=== Stage 2 ===
30 September 2024 — Arau to Butterworth, 154.5 km (96.0 mi)

Stage 2 Result
Rank	Rider	Team	Time
1	Matteo Malucelli (ITA)	JCL Team UKYO	3h 34' 58"
2	Manuel Peñalver (ESP)	Polti–Kometa	+ 0"
3	Arvid de Kleijn (NED)	Tudor Pro Cycling Team	+ 0"
4	Jakub Mareczko (ITA)	Team Corratec–Vini Fantini	+ 0"
5	Gleb Syritsa	Astana Qazaqstan Team	+ 0"
6	Mattia Pinazzi (ITA)	VF Group–Bardiani–CSF–Faizanè	+ 0"
7	Harrif Saleh (MAS)	Terengganu Cycling Team	+ 0"
8	Andoni López de Abetxuko (ESP)	Euskaltel–Euskadi	+ 0"
9	Miguel Ángel Fernández (ESP)	Equipo Kern Pharma	+ 0"
10	Casper van Uden (NED)	Team dsm–firmenich PostNL	+ 0"

General classification after Stage 2
Rank	Rider	Team	Time
1	Gleb Syritsa	Astana Qazaqstan Team	5h 39' 23"
2	Matteo Malucelli (ITA)	JCL Team UKYO	+ 2"
3	Nur Aiman Rosli (MAS)	Terengganu Cycling Team	+ 4"
4	Pak Hang Ng (HKG)	HKSI Pro Cycling Team	+ 5"
5	Manuel Peñalver (ESP)	Polti–Kometa	+ 6"
6	Casper van Uden (NED)	Team dsm–firmenich PostNL	+ 6"
7	Xavier Cañellas (ESP)	Euskaltel–Euskadi	+ 6"
8	Arvid de Kleijn (NED)	Tudor Pro Cycling Team	+ 8"
9	Lorenzo Conforti (ITA)	VF Group–Bardiani–CSF–Faizanè	+ 8"
10	Tyler Tomkinson (AUS)	ARA Skip Capital	+ 8"

=== Stage 3 ===
1 October 2024 — Taiping to Cameron Highlands, 170.3 km (105.8 mi)

Stage 3 Result
Rank	Rider	Team	Time
1	Max Poole (GBR)	Team dsm–firmenich PostNL	4h 24' 34"
2	Harold Martín López (ECU)	Astana Qazaqstan Team	+ 0"
3	Thomas Pesenti (ITA)	JCL Team UKYO	+ 0"
4	Anthon Charmig (DEN)	Astana Qazaqstan Team	+ 0"
5	Unai Iribar (ESP)	Equipo Kern Pharma	+ 0"
6	Giovanni Carboni (ITA)	JCL Team UKYO	+ 0"
7	José Manuel Díaz (ESP)	Burgos BH	+ 0"
8	Ibon Ruiz (ESP)	Equipo Kern Pharma	+ 0"
9	Mikel Bizkarra (ESP)	Euskaltel–Euskadi	+ 0"
10	Fernando Tercero (ESP)	Polti–Kometa	+ 0"

General classification after Stage 3
Rank	Rider	Team	Time
1	Max Poole (GBR)	Team dsm–firmenich PostNL	10h 03' 58"
2	Harold Martín López (ECU)	Astana Qazaqstan Team	+ 5"
3	Thomas Pesenti (ITA)	JCL Team UKYO	+ 6"
4	Unai Iribar (ESP)	Equipo Kern Pharma	+ 11"
5	Fernando Tercero (ESP)	Polti–Kometa	+ 11"
6	Ibon Ruiz (ESP)	Equipo Kern Pharma	+ 11"
7	Anthon Charmig (DEN)	Astana Qazaqstan Team	+ 11"
8	José Manuel Díaz (ESP)	Burgos BH	+ 11"
9	Giovanni Carboni (ITA)	JCL Team UKYO	+ 11"
10	Jorge Gutiérrez (ESP)	Equipo Kern Pharma	+ 11"

=== Stage 4 ===
2 October 2024 — Kuala Kubu Bharu to Bentong, 131.2 km (81.5 mi)

Stage 4 Result
Rank	Rider	Team	Time
1	Arvid de Kleijn (NED)	Tudor Pro Cycling Team	2h 53' 37"
2	Matteo Malucelli (ITA)	JCL Team UKYO	+ 0"
3	Manuel Peñalver (ESP)	Polti–Kometa	+ 0"
4	Mattia Pinazzi (ITA)	VF Group–Bardiani–CSF–Faizanè	+ 0"
5	Gleb Syritsa	Astana Qazaqstan Team	+ 0"
6	Casper van Uden (NED)	Team dsm–firmenich PostNL	+ 0"
7	Miguel Ángel Fernández (ESP)	Equipo Kern Pharma	+ 0"
8	Antonio Angulo (ESP)	Burgos BH	+ 0"
9	Xavier Cañellas (ESP)	Euskaltel–Euskadi	+ 0"
10	Giovanni Carboni (ITA)	JCL Team UKYO	+ 0"

General classification after Stage 4
Rank	Rider	Team	Time
1	Max Poole (GBR)	Team dsm–firmenich PostNL	12h 57' 35"
2	Thomas Pesenti (ITA)	JCL Team UKYO	+ 6"
3	Unai Iribar (ESP)	Equipo Kern Pharma	+ 11"
4	Fernando Tercero (ESP)	Polti–Kometa	+ 11"
5	Ibon Ruiz (ESP)	Equipo Kern Pharma	+ 11"
6	Anthon Charmig (DEN)	Astana Qazaqstan Team	+ 11"
7	Giovanni Carboni (ITA)	JCL Team UKYO	+ 11"
8	José Manuel Díaz (ESP)	Burgos BH	+ 11"
9	Jorge Gutiérrez (ESP)	Equipo Kern Pharma	+ 11"
10	Mikel Bizkarra (ESP)	Euskaltel–Euskadi	+ 11"

=== Stage 5 ===
3 October 2024 — Kuala Lumpur to Malacca City, 167.3 km (104.0 mi)

Stage 5 Result
Rank	Rider	Team	Time
1	Arvid de Kleijn (NED)	Tudor Pro Cycling Team	3h 35' 30"
2	Matteo Malucelli (ITA)	JCL Team UKYO	+ 0"
3	Gleb Syritsa	Astana Qazaqstan Team	+ 0"
4	Mattia Pinazzi (ITA)	VF Group–Bardiani–CSF–Faizanè	+ 0"
5	Manuel Peñalver (ESP)	Polti–Kometa	+ 0"
6	Andoni López de Abetxuko (ESP)	Euskaltel–Euskadi	+ 0"
7	Iker Bonillo (ESP)	Euskaltel–Euskadi	+ 0"
8	Miguel Ángel Fernández (ESP)	Equipo Kern Pharma	+ 0"
9	Alexei Shnyrko	Li-Ning Star	+ 0"
10	José Manuel Díaz (ESP)	Burgos BH	+ 0"

General classification after Stage 5
Rank	Rider	Team	Time
1	Max Poole (GBR)	Team dsm–firmenich PostNL	16h 32' 56"
2	Thomas Pesenti (ITA)	JCL Team UKYO	+ 15"
3	Unai Iribar (ESP)	Equipo Kern Pharma	+ 20"
4	Fernando Tercero (ESP)	Polti–Kometa	+ 20"
5	José Manuel Díaz (ESP)	Burgos BH	+ 20"
6	Ibon Ruiz (ESP)	Equipo Kern Pharma	+ 20"
7	Anthon Charmig (DEN)	Astana Qazaqstan Team	+ 20"
8	Jorge Gutiérrez (ESP)	Equipo Kern Pharma	+ 20"
9	Mikel Bizkarra (ESP)	Euskaltel–Euskadi	+ 20"
10	Harold Martín López (ECU)	Astana Qazaqstan Team	+ 34"

=== Stage 6 ===
4 October 2024 — Batu Pahat to Kulai, 123.4 km (76.7 mi)

Stage 6 Result
Rank	Rider	Team	Time
1	Manuele Tarozzi (ITA)	VF Group–Bardiani–CSF–Faizanè	2h 28' 58"
2	Stefan de Bod (RSA)	EF Education–EasyPost	+ 0"
3	Arvid de Kleijn (NED)	Tudor Pro Cycling Team	+ 9"
4	Manuel Peñalver (ESP)	Polti–Kometa	+ 9"
5	Casper van Uden (NED)	Team dsm–firmenich PostNL	+ 9"
6	Blake Agnoletto (AUS)	ARA Skip Capital	+ 9"
7	Matteo Malucelli (ITA)	JCL Team UKYO	+ 9"
8	Gleb Syritsa	Astana Qazaqstan Team	+ 9"
9	Xavier Cañellas (ESP)	Euskaltel–Euskadi	+ 9"
10	Hayato Okamoto (JPN)	Aisan Racing Team	+ 9"

General classification after Stage 6
Rank	Rider	Team	Time
1	Max Poole (GBR)	Team dsm–firmenich PostNL	19h 02' 03"
2	Thomas Pesenti (ITA)	JCL Team UKYO	+ 14"
3	Unai Iribar (ESP)	Equipo Kern Pharma	+ 20"
4	Fernando Tercero (ESP)	Polti–Kometa	+ 20"
5	Ibon Ruiz (ESP)	Equipo Kern Pharma	+ 20"
6	José Manuel Díaz (ESP)	Burgos BH	+ 20"
7	Anthon Charmig (DEN)	Astana Qazaqstan Team	+ 20"
8	Jorge Gutiérrez (ESP)	Equipo Kern Pharma	+ 20"
9	Mikel Bizkarra (ESP)	Euskaltel–Euskadi	+ 20"
10	Harold Martín López (ECU)	Astana Qazaqstan Team	+ 34"

=== Stage 7 ===
5 October 2024 — Miri to Bintulu, 199.3 km (123.8 mi)

Stage 7 Result
Rank	Rider	Team	Time
1	Matteo Malucelli (ITA)	JCL Team UKYO	4h 18' 03"
2	Arvid de Kleijn (NED)	Tudor Pro Cycling Team	+ 0"
3	Maikel Zijlaard (NED)	Tudor Pro Cycling Team	+ 0"
4	Gleb Syritsa	Astana Qazaqstan Team	+ 0"
5	Manuel Peñalver (ESP)	Polti–Kometa	+ 0"
6	Luke Mudgway (NZL)	Li-Ning Star	+ 0"
7	Mattia Pinazzi (ITA)	VF Group–Bardiani–CSF–Faizanè	+ 0"
8	Davide Gabburo (ITA)	VF Group–Bardiani–CSF–Faizanè	+ 0"
9	Casper van Uden (NED)	Team dsm–firmenich PostNL	+ 0"
10	Miguel Ángel Fernández (ESP)	Equipo Kern Pharma	+ 0"

General classification after Stage 7
Rank	Rider	Team	Time
1	Max Poole (GBR)	Team dsm–firmenich PostNL	23h 20' 06"
2	Thomas Pesenti (ITA)	JCL Team UKYO	+ 13"
3	Unai Iribar (ESP)	Equipo Kern Pharma	+ 20"
4	Fernando Tercero (ESP)	Polti–Kometa	+ 20"
5	Anthon Charmig (DEN)	Astana Qazaqstan Team	+ 20"
6	José Manuel Díaz (ESP)	Burgos BH	+ 20"
7	Ibon Ruiz (ESP)	Equipo Kern Pharma	+ 20"
8	Jorge Gutiérrez (ESP)	Equipo Kern Pharma	+ 20"
9	Mikel Bizkarra (ESP)	Euskaltel–Euskadi	+ 20"
10	Harold Martín López (ECU)	Astana Qazaqstan Team	+ 34"

=== Stage 8 ===
6 October 2024 — Bintulu to Bintulu, 147.5 km (91.7 mi)

Stage 8 Result
Rank	Rider	Team	Time
1	Matteo Malucelli (ITA)	JCL Team UKYO	3h 07' 38"
2	Arvid de Kleijn (NED)	Tudor Pro Cycling Team	+ 0"
3	Gleb Syritsa	Astana Qazaqstan Team	+ 0"
4	Mattia Pinazzi (ITA)	VF Group–Bardiani–CSF–Faizanè	+ 0"
5	Manuel Peñalver (ESP)	Polti–Kometa	+ 0"
6	David Martin (ESP)	Polti–Kometa	+ 0"
7	Luke Mudgway (NZL)	Li-Ning Star	+ 0"
8	Blake Agnoletto (AUS)	ARA Skip Capital	+ 0"
9	Miguel Ángel Fernández (ESP)	Equipo Kern Pharma	+ 0"
10	Maikel Zijlaard (NED)	Tudor Pro Cycling Team	+ 0"

General classification after Stage 8
Rank	Rider	Team	Time
1	Max Poole (GBR)	Team dsm–firmenich PostNL	26h 27' 44"
2	Thomas Pesenti (ITA)	JCL Team UKYO	+ 13"
3	Unai Iribar (ESP)	Equipo Kern Pharma	+ 20"
4	Fernando Tercero (ESP)	Polti–Kometa	+ 20"
5	Anthon Charmig (DEN)	Astana Qazaqstan Team	+ 20"
6	José Manuel Díaz (ESP)	Burgos BH	+ 20"
7	Ibon Ruiz (ESP)	Equipo Kern Pharma	+ 20"
8	Jorge Gutiérrez (ESP)	Equipo Kern Pharma	+ 20"
9	Mikel Bizkarra (ESP)	Euskaltel–Euskadi	+ 20"
10	Harold Martín López (ECU)	Astana Qazaqstan Team	+ 34"

== Classification leadership table ==
Classification leadership by stage
Stage	Winner	General classification	Points classification	Mountains classification	Asian rider classification	Team classification
1	Gleb Syritsa	Gleb Syritsa	Gleb Syritsa	Tyler Tomkinson	Nur Aiman Rosli	VF Group–Bardiani–CSF–Faizanè
2	Matteo Malucelli	Gleb Syritsa	Gleb Syritsa	Tyler Tomkinson	Nur Aiman Rosli	VF Group–Bardiani–CSF–Faizanè
3	Max Poole	Max Poole	Matteo Malucelli	Max Poole	Manabu Ishibashi	Equipo Kern Pharma
4	Arvid de Kleijn	Max Poole	Matteo Malucelli	Mario Aparicio	Manabu Ishibashi	Equipo Kern Pharma
5	Arvid de Kleijn	Max Poole	Matteo Malucelli	Mario Aparicio	Manabu Ishibashi	Equipo Kern Pharma
6	Manuele Tarozzi	Max Poole	Arvid de Kleijn	Mario Aparicio	Manabu Ishibashi	Equipo Kern Pharma
7	Matteo Malucelli	Max Poole	Arvid de Kleijn	Mario Aparicio	Manabu Ishibashi	Equipo Kern Pharma
8	Matteo Malucelli	Max Poole	Matteo Malucelli	Mario Aparicio	Manabu Ishibashi	Equipo Kern Pharma
Final		Max Poole	Matteo Malucelli	Mario Aparicio	Manabu Ishibashi	Equipo Kern Pharma

== Classification standings ==
Legend
Denotes the winner of the general classification	Denotes the winner of the mountains classification
Denotes the winner of the points classification	Denotes the winner of the Asian rider classification

=== General classification ===
Final general classification (1–10)
Rank	Rider	Team	Time
1	Max Poole (GBR)	Team dsm–firmenich PostNL	26h 27' 44"
2	Thomas Pesenti (ITA)	JCL Team UKYO	+ 13"
3	Unai Iribar (ESP)	Equipo Kern Pharma	+ 20"
4	Fernando Tercero (ESP)	Polti–Kometa	+ 20"
5	Anthon Charmig (DEN)	Astana Qazaqstan Team	+ 20"
6	José Manuel Díaz (ESP)	Burgos BH	+ 20"
7	Ibon Ruiz (ESP)	Equipo Kern Pharma	+ 20"
8	Jorge Gutiérrez (ESP)	Equipo Kern Pharma	+ 20"
9	Mikel Bizkarra (ESP)	Euskaltel–Euskadi	+ 20"
10	Harold Martín López (ECU)	Astana Qazaqstan Team	+ 34"

=== Points classification ===
Final points classification (1–10)
Rank	Rider	Team	Points
1	Matteo Malucelli (ITA)	JCL Team UKYO	80
2	Arvid de Kleijn (NED)	Tudor Pro Cycling Team	78
3	Gleb Syritsa	Astana Qazaqstan Team	57
4	Manuel Peñalver (ITA)	Polti–Kometa	54
5	Mattia Pinazzi (ITA)	VF Group–Bardiani–CSF–Faizanè	33
6	Casper van Uden (NED)	Team dsm–firmenich PostNL	26
7	Max Poole (GBR)	Team dsm–firmenich PostNL	25
8	Manuele Tarozzi (ITA)	VF Group–Bardiani–CSF–Faizanè	20
9	Stefan de Bod (RSA)	EF Education–EasyPost	19
10	Miguel Ángel Fernández (ESP)	Equipo Kern Pharma	15

=== Mountains classification ===
Final mountains classification (1–10)
Rank	Rider	Team	Points
1	Mario Aparicio (ESP)	Burgos BH	27
2	Max Poole (GBR)	Team dsm–firmenich PostNL	22
3	Anthon Charmig (DEN)	Astana Qazaqstan Team	12
4	Harold Martín López (ECU)	Astana Qazaqstan Team	9
5	Joan Bou (ESP)	Euskaltel–Euskadi	9
6	José Manuel Díaz (ESP)	Burgos BH	8
7	Thomas Pesenti (ITA)	JCL Team UKYO	8
8	Stefan de Bod (RSA)	EF Education–EasyPost	8
9	Miguel Ángel Fernández (ESP)	Equipo Kern Pharma	8
10	Yuma Koishi (JPN)	JCL Team UKYO	6

=== Asian rider classification ===
Final asian rider classification (1–10)
Rank	Rider	Team	Time
1	Manabu Ishibashi (JPN)	JCL Team UKYO	26h 30' 02"
2	Yuma Koishi (JPN)	JCL Team UKYO	+ 2' 41"
3	Keigo Kusaba (JPN)	Aisan Racing Team	+ 2' 45"
4	Thanakhan Chaiyasombat (THA)	Thailand	+ 2' 45"
5	Nariyuki Masuda (JPN)	JCL Team UKYO	+ 2' 45"
6	Nur Aiman Mohd Zariff (MAS)	Terengganu Cycling Team	+ 5' 16"
7	Marcelo Felipe (PHI)	Philippines	+ 6' 34"
8	Muhammad Syawal Mazlin (MAS)	Malaysia Pro Cycling	+ 7' 41"
9	Nur Aiman Rosli (MAS)	Terengganu Cycling Team	+ 7' 51"
10	Zulfikri Zulkifli (MAS)	Malaysia Pro Cycling	+ 9' 29"

=== Team classification ===
Final team classification (1–10)
Rank	Team	Time
1	(Spain) Equipo Kern Pharma	79h 24' 12"
2	(Kazakhstan) Astana Qazaqstan Team	+ 1' 31"
3	(Italy) Polti–Kometa	+ 1' 40"
4	(Japan) JCL Team UKYO	+ 1' 58"
5	(Spain) Euskaltel–Euskadi	+ 2' 37"
6	(Spain) Burgos BH	+ 2' 37"
7	(Switzerland) Tudor Pro Cycling Team	+ 3' 40"
8	(United States) EF Education–EasyPost	+ 3' 46"
9	(Italy) Team Corratec–Vini Fantini	+ 6' 31"
10	(Italy) VF Group–Bardiani–CSF–Faizanè	+ 8' 44"
