= 2023 Eolo–Kometa season =

Eolo–Kometa
- 2023 season
- UCI code: EOK
- Status: UCI ProTeam
- Manager: Alberto Contador (ESP)
- Main sponsor(s): Eolo; Kometa
- Based: Italy
- Bicycles: Aurum
- Groupset: SRAM

Season victories
- Stage race overall: 1
- Stage race stages: 2

The 2023 season for the Eolo–Kometa team is the team's 6th season in existence and its third as a UCI ProTeam.

Italian telecommunication company Eolo is the main title sponsor with Italian-Hungarian food company Kometa co-title sponsor.

== Team roster ==
As of 13 January 2023.

Rider	Date of birth
Vincenzo Albanese (ITA)	12 November 1996 (aged 26)
Davide Bais (ITA)	2 April 1998 (aged 24)
Mattia Bais (ITA)	19 October 1996 (aged 26)
Simone Bevilacqua (ITA)	22 February 1997 (aged 25)
Alessandro Fancellu (ITA)	24 April 2000 (aged 22)
Erik Fetter (HUN)	5 April 2000 (aged 22)
Lorenzo Fortunato (ITA)	9 May 1996 (aged 26)
Andrea Garosio (ITA)	6 December 1993 (aged 29)
Francesco Gavazzi (ITA)	1 August 1984 (aged 38)
Giovanni Lonardi (ITA)	9 November 1996 (aged 26)

Rider	Date of birth
Mirco Maestri (ITA)	26 October 1991 (aged 31)
Álex Martín (ESP)	25 January 2000 (aged 22)
David Martín (ESP)	19 February 1999 (aged 23)
Andrea Pietrobon (ITA)	11 March 1999 (aged 23)
Davide Piganzoli (ITA)	8 July 2002 (aged 20)
Simone Raccani (ITA)	2 March 2001 (aged 21)
Samuele Rivi (ITA)	11 May 1998 (aged 24)
Javier Serrano (ESP)	17 April 2001 (aged 21)
Diego Pablo Sevilla (ESP)	4 March 1996 (aged 26)
Fernando Tercero (ESP)	28 December 2001 (aged 21)

Riders who joined the team for the 2023 season

Rider	2022 team
Mattia Bais	Drone Hopper–Androni Giocattoli
Andrea Garosio	Biesse–Carrera
Andrea Pietrobon	Eolo–Kometa U23
Davide Piganzoli	Eolo–Kometa U23
Simone Raccani	Zalf Euromobil Fior
Javier Serrano	Eolo–Kometa U23
Fernando Tercero	Eolo–Kometa U23

Riders who left the team during or after the 2022 season

Rider	2023 team
Mark Christian	Retired
Márton Dina	ATT Investments
Alessandro Fedeli	Q36.5 Pro Cycling Team
Sergio García	Anicolor / Tien 21
Arturo Grávalos	Health issue
Edward Ravasi	Hrinkow Advarics
Alejandro Ropero	Electro Hiper Europa
Diego Rosa	Retired
Daniel Viegas	Aviludo–Louletano–Loulé Concelho

== Season victories ==
Date	Race	Competition	Rider	Country	Location	Ref.
19 April	Giro di Sicilia, Points classification	UCI EuropeTour	Vincenzo Albanese (ITA)	Italy		
29 April	Vuelta a Asturias, Stage 2	UCI EuropeTour	Lorenzo Fortunato (ITA)	Spain	Cangas del Narcea	
30 April	Vuelta a Asturias, Overall	UCI EuropeTour	Lorenzo Fortunato (ITA)	Spain		
30 April	Vuelta a Asturias, Points classification	UCI EuropeTour	Vincenzo Albanese (ITA)	Spain		
30 April	Vuelta a Asturias, Young rider classification	UCI EuropeTour	Fernando Tercero (ESP)	Spain		
12 May	Giro d'Italia, Stage 7	UCI World Tour	Davide Bais (ITA)	Italy	Gran Sasso	
24 August	Tour Poitou-Charentes en Nouvelle-Aquitaine, Stage 3a	UCI EuropeTour	Samuele Rivi (ITA)	France	La Roche-Posay	

== National, Continental, and World Champions ==
Date	Discipline	Jersey	Rider	Country	Location	Ref.
