= 2023 Tour de Romandie =

2023 UCI World Tour, race 20 of 35

Race details
- Dates: 25–30 April 2023
- Stages: 5 + Prologue
- Distance: 691.57 km (429.72 mi)
- Winning time: 17h 12' 42"

Results
Jersey awarded to the overall winner	Winner	Adam Yates (GBR)	(UAE Team Emirates)
	Second	Matteo Jorgenson (USA)	(Movistar Team)
	Third	Damiano Caruso (ITA)	(Team Bahrain Victorious)
Jersey awarded to the points classification winner	Points	Ethan Hayter (GBR)	(INEOS Grenadiers)
Jersey awarded to the mountains classification winner	Mountains	Julien Bernard (FRA)	(Trek–Segafredo)
Jersey awarded to the young rider classification winner	Young rider	Matteo Jorgenson (USA)	(Movistar Team)
	Team	(United Arab Emirates) UAE Team Emirates	

The 2023 Tour de Romandie was a road cycling stage race held between 25 and 30 April 2023 in Romandy, the French-speaking part of western Switzerland. It was the 76th edition of the Tour de Romandie and the 20th race of the 2023 UCI World Tour.

== Teams ==
All eighteen UCI WorldTeams, three UCI ProTeams, and the Swiss national team participated in the race.

UCI WorldTeams

- AG2R Citroën Team
- Alpecin–Deceuninck
- Astana Qazaqstan Team
- Arkéa–Samsic
- Bora–Hansgrohe
- Cofidis
- EF Education–EasyPost
- Groupama–FDJ
- INEOS Grenadiers
- Intermarché–Circus–Wanty
- Movistar Team
- Soudal–Quick-Step
- Team Bahrain Victorious
- Team DSM
- Team Jayco–AlUla
- Team Jumbo–Visma
- Trek–Segafredo
- UAE Team Emirates

UCI ProTeams

- Israel–Premier Tech
- Lotto–Dstny
- Tudor Pro Cycling Team

National Teams

- Switzerland

== Route ==
Stage characteristics and winners
Stage	Date	Route	Distance	Type	Winner
P	25 April	Port-Valais	6.82 km (4.24 mi)	Individual time trial	Josef Černý (CZE)
1	26 April	Crissier to Vallée de Joux	170.9 km (106.2 mi)	Hilly stage	Ethan Vernon (GBR)
2	27 April	Morteau (France) to La Chaux-de-Fonds	162.7 km (101.1 mi)	Hilly stage	Ethan Hayter (GBR)
3	28 April	Châtel-Saint-Denis to Châtel-Saint-Denis	18.75 km (11.65 mi)	Individual time trial	Juan Ayuso (ESP)
4	29 April	Sion to Thyon 2000	161.6 km (100.4 mi)	Mountain stage	Adam Yates (GBR)
5	30 April	Vufflens-la-Ville to Geneva	170.8 km (106.1 mi)	Hilly stage	Fernando Gaviria (COL)
Total			691.57 km (429.72 mi)		

== Stages ==
=== Prologue ===
25 April 2023 — Port-Valais, 6.82 kilometres (4.24 mi) (ITT)

Prologue result
Rank	Rider	Team	Time
1	Josef Černý (CZE)	Soudal–Quick-Step	7' 25"
2	Tobias Foss (NOR)	Team Jumbo–Visma	+ 1"
3	Rémi Cavagna (FRA)	Soudal–Quick-Step	+ 1"
4	Nico Denz (GER)	Bora–Hansgrohe	+ 4"
5	Joel Suter (SUI)	Tudor Pro Cycling Team	+ 5"
6	Ethan Hayter (GBR)	INEOS Grenadiers	+ 5"
7	Mikkel Bjerg (DEN)	UAE Team Emirates	+ 9"
8	Matteo Sobrero (ITA)	Team Jayco–AlUla	+ 9"
9	Ivo Oliveira (POR)	UAE Team Emirates	+ 9"
10	Ethan Vernon (GBR)	Soudal–Quick-Step	+ 10"

General classification after prologue
Rank	Rider	Team	Time
1	Josef Černý (CZE)	Soudal–Quick-Step	7' 25"
2	Tobias Foss (NOR)	Team Jumbo–Visma	+ 1"
3	Rémi Cavagna (FRA)	Soudal–Quick-Step	+ 1"
4	Nico Denz (GER)	Bora–Hansgrohe	+ 4"
5	Joel Suter (SUI)	Tudor Pro Cycling Team	+ 5"
6	Ethan Hayter (GBR)	INEOS Grenadiers	+ 5"
7	Mikkel Bjerg (DEN)	UAE Team Emirates	+ 9"
8	Matteo Sobrero (ITA)	Team Jayco–AlUla	+ 9"
9	Ivo Oliveira (POR)	UAE Team Emirates	+ 9"
10	Ethan Vernon (GBR)	Soudal–Quick-Step	+ 10"

=== Stage 1 ===
26 April 2023 — Crissier to Vallée de Joux, 170.9 kilometres (106.2 mi)

Stage 1 result
Rank	Rider	Team	Time
1	Ethan Vernon (GBR)	Soudal–Quick-Step	4h 05' 34"
2	Thibau Nys (BEL)	Trek–Segafredo	+ 0"
3	Milan Menten (BEL)	Lotto–Dstny	+ 0"
4	Romain Bardet (FRA)	Team DSM	+ 0"
5	Jacopo Mosca (ITA)	Trek–Segafredo	+ 0"
6	Nick Schultz (AUS)	Israel–Premier Tech	+ 0"
7	Lilian Calmejane (FRA)	Intermarché–Circus–Wanty	+ 0"
8	Clement Venturini (FRA)	AG2R Citroën Team	+ 0"
9	Ivo Oliveira (POR)	UAE Team Emirates	+ 0"
10	Quinten Hermans (BEL)	Alpecin–Deceuninck	+ 0"

General classification after stage 1
Rank	Rider	Team	Time
1	Ethan Vernon (GBR)	Soudal–Quick-Step	4h 12' 59"
2	Josef Černý (CZE)	Soudal–Quick-Step	+ 0"
3	Tobias Foss (NOR)	Team Jumbo–Visma	+ 1"
4	Rémi Cavagna (FRA)	Soudal–Quick-Step	+ 1"
5	Nico Denz (GER)	Bora–Hansgrohe	+ 4"
6	Joel Suter (SUI)	Tudor Pro Cycling Team	+ 5"
7	Ethan Hayter (GBR)	INEOS Grenadiers	+ 5"
8	Mikkel Bjerg (DEN)	UAE Team Emirates	+ 9"
9	Matteo Sobrero (ITA)	Team Jayco–AlUla	+ 9"
10	Ivo Oliveira (POR)	UAE Team Emirates	+ 9"

=== Stage 2 ===
27 April 2023 — Morteau to La Chaux-de-Fonds, 162.7 kilometres (101.1 mi)

Stage 2 result
Rank	Rider	Team	Time
1	Ethan Hayter (GBR)	INEOS Grenadiers	3h 55' 20"
2	Juan Ayuso (ESP)	UAE Team Emirates	+ 0"
3	Romain Bardet (FRA)	Team DSM	+ 0"
4	Matteo Sobrero (ITA)	Team Jayco–AlUla	+ 0"
5	Oscar Onley (GBR)	Team DSM	+ 0"
6	Harry Sweeny (AUS)	Lotto–Dstny	+ 0"
7	Kobe Goossens (BEL)	Intermarché–Circus–Wanty	+ 0"
8	Magnus Cort (DEN)	EF Education–EasyPost	+ 0"
9	Finn Fisher-Black (NZL)	UAE Team Emirates	+ 0"
10	Nick Schultz (AUS)	Israel–Premier Tech	+ 0"

General classification after stage 2
Rank	Rider	Team	Time
1	Ethan Hayter (GBR)	INEOS Grenadiers	8h 08' 14"
2	Tobias Foss (NOR)	Team Jumbo–Visma	+ 6"
3	Rémi Cavagna (FRA)	Soudal–Quick-Step	+ 6"
4	Juan Ayuso (ESP)	UAE Team Emirates	+ 11"
5	Matteo Sobrero (ITA)	Team Jayco–AlUla	+ 14"
6	Nelson Oliveira (POR)	Movistar Team	+ 15"
7	Romain Bardet (FRA)	Team DSM	+ 17"
8	Jonathan Castroviejo (ESP)	INEOS Grenadiers	+ 17"
9	Finn Fisher-Black (NZL)	UAE Team Emirates	+ 17"
10	Rainer Kepplinger (AUT)	Team Bahrain Victorious	+ 18"

=== Stage 3 ===
28 April 2023 — Châtel-Saint-Denis to Châtel-Saint-Denis, 18.75 kilometres (11.65 mi) (ITT)

Stage 3 result
Rank	Rider	Team	Time
1	Juan Ayuso (ESP)	UAE Team Emirates	25' 15"
2	Matteo Jorgenson (USA)	Movistar Team	+ 5"
3	Adam Yates (GBR)	UAE Team Emirates	+ 17"
4	Nelson Oliveira (POR)	Movistar Team	+ 18"
5	Will Barta (USA)	Movistar Team	+ 19"
6	Damiano Caruso (ITA)	Team Bahrain Victorious	+ 20"
7	Mikkel Bjerg (DEN)	UAE Team Emirates	+ 24"
8	Tobias Foss (NOR)	Team Jumbo–Visma	+ 24"
9	Gino Mäder (SUI)	Team Bahrain Victorious	+ 25"
10	Max Poole (GBR)	Team DSM	+ 27"

General classification after stage 3
Rank	Rider	Team	Time
1	Juan Ayuso (ESP)	UAE Team Emirates	8h 33' 40"
2	Matteo Jorgenson (USA)	Movistar Team	+ 18"
3	Tobias Foss (NOR)	Team Jumbo–Visma	+ 19"
4	Nelson Oliveira (POR)	Movistar Team	+ 22"
5	Adam Yates (GBR)	UAE Team Emirates	+ 30"
6	Damiano Caruso (ITA)	Team Bahrain Victorious	+ 32"
7	Finn Fisher-Black (NZL)	UAE Team Emirates	+ 34"
8	Jonathan Castroviejo (ESP)	INEOS Grenadiers	+ 36"
9	Max Poole (GBR)	Team DSM	+ 38"
10	Ethan Hayter (GBR)	INEOS Grenadiers	+ 38"

=== Stage 4 ===
29 April 2023 — Sion to Thyon 2000, 161.6 kilometres (100.4 mi)

Stage 4 result
Rank	Rider	Team	Time
1	Adam Yates (GBR)	UAE Team Emirates	4h 40' 41"
2	Thibaut Pinot (FRA)	Groupama–FDJ	+ 7"
3	Damiano Caruso (ITA)	Team Bahrain Victorious	+ 19"
4	Max Poole (GBR)	Team DSM	+ 21"
5	Matteo Jorgenson (USA)	Movistar Team	+ 21"
6	Cian Uijtdebroeks (BEL)	Bora–Hansgrohe	+ 23"
7	Romain Bardet (FRA)	Team DSM	+ 45"
8	Egan Bernal (COL)	INEOS Grenadiers	+ 54"
9	Eddie Dunbar (IRL)	Team Jayco–AlUla	+ 54"
10	Thomas Gloag (GBR)	Team Jumbo–Visma	+ 54"

General classification after stage 4
Rank	Rider	Team	Time
1	Adam Yates (GBR)	UAE Team Emirates	13h 14' 41"
2	Matteo Jorgenson (USA)	Movistar Team	+ 19"
3	Damiano Caruso (ITA)	Team Bahrain Victorious	+ 27"
4	Max Poole (GBR)	Team DSM	+ 38"
5	Thibaut Pinot (FRA)	Groupama–FDJ	+ 41"
6	Cian Uijtdebroeks (BEL)	Bora–Hansgrohe	+ 1' 21"
7	Romain Bardet (FRA)	Team DSM	+ 1' 28"
8	Egan Bernal (COL)	INEOS Grenadiers	+ 1' 53"
9	Eddie Dunbar (IRL)	Team Jayco–AlUla	+ 1' 53"
10	Rafał Majka (POL)	UAE Team Emirates	+ 2' 07"

=== Stage 5 ===
30 April 2023 — Vufflens-la-Ville to Geneva, 170.8 kilometres (106.1 mi)

Stage 5 result
Rank	Rider	Team	Time
1	Fernando Gaviria (COL)	Movistar Team	3h 58' 01"
2	Nikias Arndt (GER)	Team Bahrain Victorious	+ 0"
3	Ethan Hayter (GBR)	INEOS Grenadiers	+ 0"
4	Milan Menten (BEL)	Lotto–Dstny	+ 0"
5	Gianmarco Garofoli (ITA)	Astana Qazaqstan Team	+ 0"
6	Luca Mozzato (ITA)	Arkéa–Samsic	+ 0"
7	Lewis Askey (GBR)	Groupama–FDJ	+ 0"
8	Magnus Cort (DEN)	EF Education–EasyPost	+ 0"
9	Matteo Sobrero (ITA)	Team Jayco–AlUla	+ 0"
10	Dion Smith (NZL)	Intermarché–Circus–Wanty	+ 0"

General classification after stage 5
Rank	Rider	Team	Time
1	Adam Yates (GBR)	UAE Team Emirates	17h 12' 42"
2	Matteo Jorgenson (USA)	Movistar Team	+ 19"
3	Damiano Caruso (ITA)	Team Bahrain Victorious	+ 27"
4	Max Poole (GBR)	Team DSM	+ 38"
5	Thibaut Pinot (FRA)	Groupama–FDJ	+ 41"
6	Cian Uijtdebroeks (BEL)	Bora–Hansgrohe	+ 1' 21"
7	Romain Bardet (FRA)	Team DSM	+ 1' 28"
8	Egan Bernal (COL)	INEOS Grenadiers	+ 1' 53"
9	Eddie Dunbar (IRL)	Team Jayco–AlUla	+ 1' 53"
10	Rafał Majka (POL)	UAE Team Emirates	+ 2' 07"

== Classification leadership table ==
Classification leadership by stage
Stage	Winner	General classification	Points classification	Mountains classification	Young rider classification	Team classification	Combativity award
P	Josef Černý	Josef Černý	Josef Černý	Not awarded	Ethan Vernon	Soudal–Quick-Step	Not awarded
1	Ethan Vernon	Ethan Vernon	Ethan Vernon	Julien Bernard	Ethan Vernon	Soudal–Quick-Step	Julien Bernard
2	Ethan Hayter	Ethan Hayter	Ethan Hayter	Julien Bernard	Juan Ayuso	UAE Team Emirates	Gleb Brussenskiy
3	Juan Ayuso	Juan Ayuso	Ethan Hayter	Julien Bernard	Juan Ayuso	UAE Team Emirates	Not awarded
4	Adam Yates	Adam Yates	Ethan Hayter	Julien Bernard	Matteo Jorgenson	UAE Team Emirates	Thomas de Gendt
5	Fernando Gaviria	Adam Yates	Ethan Hayter	Julien Bernard	Matteo Jorgenson	UAE Team Emirates	Alexander Kamp
Final		Adam Yates	Ethan Hayter	Julien Bernard	Matteo Jorgenson	UAE Team Emirates	Not awarded

== Classification standings ==
Legend
Denotes the winner of the general classification	Denotes the winner of the young rider classification
Denotes the winner of the points classification	Denotes the winner of the combativity award
Denotes the winner of the mountains classification	

=== General classification ===
Final general classification (1–10)
Rank	Rider	Team	Time
1	Adam Yates (GBR)	UAE Team Emirates	17h 12' 42"
2	Matteo Jorgenson (USA)	Movistar Team	+ 19"
3	Damiano Caruso (ITA)	Team Bahrain Victorious	+ 27"
4	Max Poole (GBR)	Team DSM	+ 57"
5	Thibaut Pinot (FRA)	Groupama–FDJ	+ 41"
6	Cian Uijtdebroeks (BEL)	Bora–Hansgrohe	+ 1' 21"
7	Romain Bardet (FRA)	Team DSM	+ 1' 28"
8	Egan Bernal (COL)	INEOS Grenadiers	+ 1' 53"
9	Eddie Dunbar (IRL)	Team Jayco–AlUla	+ 1' 53"
10	Rafał Majka (POL)	UAE Team Emirates	+ 2' 07"

=== Points classification ===
Final points classification (1–10)
Rank	Rider	Team	Points
1	Ethan Hayter (GBR)	INEOS Grenadiers	100
2	Juan Ayuso (ESP)	UAE Team Emirates	64
3	Ethan Vernon (GBR)	Soudal–Quick-Step	57
4	Adam Yates (GBR)	UAE Team Emirates	52
5	Romain Bardet (FRA)	Team DSM	51
6	Fernando Gaviria (COL)	Movistar Team	50
7	Matteo Jorgenson (USA)	Movistar Team	48
8	Damiano Caruso (ITA)	Team Bahrain Victorious	40
9	Nikias Arndt (GER)	Team Bahrain Victorious	38
10	Milan Menten (BEL)	Lotto–Dstny	38

=== Mountains classification ===
Final mountains classification (1–10)
Rank	Rider	Team	Points
1	Julien Bernard (FRA)	Trek–Segafredo	64
2	Thomas De Gendt (BEL)	Lotto–Dstny	18
3	Adam Yates (GBR)	UAE Team Emirates	17
4	Gleb Brussenskiy (KAZ)	Astana Qazaqstan Team	15
5	Thomas Gloag (GBR)	Team Jumbo–Visma	13
6	Ben Zwiehoff (GER)	Bora–Hansgrohe	13
7	Dario Lillo (SUI)	Switzerland	12
8	Paul Lapeira (FRA)	AG2R Citroën Team	10
9	Tom Bohli (SUI)	Tudor Pro Cycling Team	10
10	Robert Stannard (AUS)	Alpecin–Deceuninck	9

=== Young rider classification ===
Final young rider classification (1–10)
Rank	Rider	Team	Time
1	Matteo Jorgenson (USA)	Movistar Team	17h 13' 01"
2	Max Poole (GBR)	Team DSM	+ 19"
3	Cian Uijtdebroeks (BEL)	Bora–Hansgrohe	+ 1' 02"
4	Thomas Gloag (GBR)	Team Jumbo–Visma	+ 1' 55"
5	Juan Ayuso (ESP)	UAE Team Emirates	+ 2' 49"
6	Filippo Zana (ITA)	Team Jayco–AlUla	+ 2' 52"
7	Oscar Onley (GBR)	Team DSM	+ 3' 23"
8	Lenny Martinez (FRA)	Groupama–FDJ	+ 5' 07"
9	Finn Fisher-Black (NZL)	UAE Team Emirates	+ 6' 00"
10	Asbjørn Hellemose (DEN)	Trek–Segafredo	+ 12' 01"

=== Team classification ===
Final team classification (1–10)
Rank	Team	Time
1	(United Arab Emirates) UAE Team Emirates	51h 42' 41"
2	(Netherlands) Team DSM	+ 1' 01"
3	Team Bahrain Victorious	+ 1' 22"
4	(Spain) Movistar Team	+ 3' 38"
5	(United Kingdom) INEOS Grenadiers	+ 3' 55"
6	(Australia) Team Jayco–AlUla	+ 7' 37"
7	(United States) EF Education–EasyPost	+ 8' 00"
8	(Netherlands) Team Jumbo–Visma	+ 12' 47"
9	(France) AG2R Citroën Team	+ 13' 29"
10	(Switzerland) Tudor Pro Cycling Team	+ 16' 52"
