= 2023 Vuelta a Asturias =

Spanish cycling race

2023 Vuelta Asturias
2023 UCI Europe Tour

Race details
- Dates: 28–30 April 2023
- Stages: 3
- Distance: 511 km (317.5 mi)
- Winning time: 12h 42' 33"

Results
Jersey awarded to the overall winner	Winner	Lorenzo Fortunato (ITA)	(Eolo–Kometa)
	Second	Einer Rubio (COL)	(Movistar Team)
	Third	Iván Sosa (COL)	(Movistar Team)
Jersey awarded to the points classification winner	Points	Vincenzo Albanese (ITA)	(Eolo–Kometa)
Jersey awarded to the mountains classification winner	Mountains	Ollie Jones (NZL)	(Bolton Equities Black Spoke)
Jersey awarded to the sprints classification winner	Sprints	Víctor Martínez Garcia (ESP)	(Electro Hiper Europa)
Jersey awarded to the team classification winner	Team	Euskaltel–Euskadi	

The 2023 Vuelta Asturias Julio Alvarez Mendo was a road cycling stage race that took place between 28 and 30 April 2023 in the Asturias region of northwestern Spain. It was the 65th edition of the Vuelta Asturias and was part of the 2023 UCI Europe Tour calendar as a category 2.1 event.

== Teams ==
One UCI WorldTeam, nine UCI ProTeams, and five UCI Continental teams made up the fifteen teams that participated in the race. All but two teams fielded the maximum of seven riders: Bolton Equities Black Spoke and Q36.5 Pro Cycling Team entered six and Team TotalEnergies entered five. There was a total of 101 riders that started the race.

UCI WorldTeams

- Movistar Team

UCI ProTeams

- Bolton Equities Black Spoke
- Burgos BH
- Caja Rural–Seguros RGA
- Eolo–Kometa
- Equipo Kern Pharma
- Euskaltel–Euskadi
- Q36.5 Pro Cycling Team
- Team Novo Nordisk
- Team TotalEnergies

UCI Continental Teams

- Aviludo–Louletano–Loulé
- Efapel Cycling
- Electro Hiper Europa
- Global 6 United
- NSJBI Victoria Sports

== Route ==
Stage characteristics and winners
Stage	Date	Route	Distance	Type	Winner
1	28 April	Oviedo to Pola de Lena	182 km (113 mi)	Mountain stage	Damien Howson (AUS)
2	29 April	Candás to Cangas del Narcea	182.6 km (113.5 mi)	Mountain stage	Lorenzo Fortunato (ITA)
3	30 April	Cangas del Narcea to Oviedo	146.5 km (91.0 mi)	Mountain stage	Pelayo Sánchez (ESP)
Total			511 km (318 mi)		

== Stages ==
=== Stage 1 ===
28 April 2023 – Oviedo to Pola de Lena, 182 km (113 mi)

Stage 1 Result
Rank	Rider	Team	Time
1	Damien Howson (AUS)	Q36.5 Pro Cycling Team	4h 39' 58"
2	Vincenzo Albanese (ITA)	Eolo–Kometa	+ 4"
3	Roger Adrià (ESP)	Equipo Kern Pharma	+ 4"
4	Gianluca Brambilla (ITA)	Q36.5 Pro Cycling Team	+ 4"
5	Steff Cras (BEL)	Team TotalEnergies	+ 4"
6	Einer Rubio (COL)	Movistar Team	+ 4"
7	Iván Sosa (COL)	Movistar Team	+ 4"
8	Ander Okamika (ESP)	Burgos BH	+ 4"
9	Joaquim Silva (POR)	Efapel Cycling	+ 4"
10	Abel Balderstone (ESP)	Caja Rural–Seguros RGA	+ 4"

General classification after Stage 1
Rank	Rider	Team	Time
1	Damien Howson (AUS)	Q36.5 Pro Cycling Team	4h 39' 48"
2	Vincenzo Albanese (ITA)	Eolo–Kometa	+ 8"
3	Roger Adrià (ESP)	Equipo Kern Pharma	+ 10"
4	Gianluca Brambilla (ITA)	Q36.5 Pro Cycling Team	+ 14"
5	Steff Cras (BEL)	Team TotalEnergies	+ 14"
6	Einer Rubio (COL)	Movistar Team	+ 14"
7	Iván Sosa (COL)	Movistar Team	+ 14"
8	Ander Okamika (ESP)	Burgos BH	+ 14"
9	Joaquim Silva (POR)	Efapel Cycling	+ 14"
10	Abel Balderstone (ESP)	Caja Rural–Seguros RGA	+ 14"

=== Stage 2 ===
29 April 2023 – Candás to Cangas del Narcea, 182.6 km (113.5 mi)

Stage 2 Result
Rank	Rider	Team	Time
1	Lorenzo Fortunato (ITA)	Eolo–Kometa	4h 35' 11"
2	Einer Rubio (COL)	Movistar Team	+ 27"
3	Iván Sosa (COL)	Movistar Team	+ 27"
4	José Manuel Díaz (ESP)	Burgos BH	+ 37"
5	José Félix Parra (ESP)	Equipo Kern Pharma	+ 38"
6	Steff Cras (BEL)	Team TotalEnergies	+ 38"
7	Mikel Bizkarra (ESP)	Euskaltel–Euskadi	+ 38"
8	Damien Howson (AUS)	Q36.5 Pro Cycling Team	+ 38"
9	Gianluca Brambilla (ITA)	Q36.5 Pro Cycling Team	+ 38"
10	Fernando Tercero (ESP)	Eolo–Kometa	+ 38"

General classification after Stage 2
Rank	Rider	Team	Time
1	Lorenzo Fortunato (ITA)	Eolo–Kometa	9h 15' 03"
2	Einer Rubio (COL)	Movistar Team	+ 31"
3	Iván Sosa (COL)	Movistar Team	+ 33"
4	Damien Howson (AUS)	Q36.5 Pro Cycling Team	+ 34"
5	Roger Adrià (ESP)	Equipo Kern Pharma	+ 44"
6	Steff Cras (BEL)	Team TotalEnergies	+ 48"
7	Gianluca Brambilla (ITA)	Q36.5 Pro Cycling Team	+ 48"
8	Mikel Bizkarra (ESP)	Euskaltel–Euskadi	+ 48"
9	Joaquim Silva (POR)	Efapel Cycling	+ 48"
10	Fernando Tercero (ESP)	Eolo–Kometa	+ 59"

=== Stage 3 ===
30 April 2023 – Cangas del Narcea to Oviedo, 146.5 km (91.0 mi)

Stage 3 Result
Rank	Rider	Team	Time
1	Pelayo Sánchez (ESP)	Burgos BH	3h 27' 13"
2	Vincenzo Albanese (ITA)	Eolo–Kometa	+ 17"
3	Steff Cras (BEL)	Team TotalEnergies	+ 17"
4	Orluis Aular (VEN)	Caja Rural–Seguros RGA	+ 17"
5	Gianluca Brambilla (ITA)	Q36.5 Pro Cycling Team	+ 17"
6	Joan Bou (ESP)	Euskaltel–Euskadi	+ 17"
7	Alan Jousseaume (FRA)	Team TotalEnergies	+ 17"
8	Jesús del Pino (ESP)	Aviludo–Louletano–Loulé	+ 17"
9	Einer Rubio (COL)	Movistar Team	+ 17"
10	Damien Howson (AUS)	Q36.5 Pro Cycling Team	+ 17"

Final general classification
Rank	Rider	Team	Time
1	Lorenzo Fortunato (ITA)	Eolo–Kometa	12h 42' 33"
2	Einer Rubio (COL)	Movistar Team	+ 31"
3	Iván Sosa (COL)	Movistar Team	+ 33"
4	Damien Howson (AUS)	Q36.5 Pro Cycling Team	+ 34"
5	Steff Cras (BEL)	Team TotalEnergies	+ 44"
6	Roger Adrià (ESP)	Equipo Kern Pharma	+ 44"
7	Gianluca Brambilla (ITA)	Q36.5 Pro Cycling Team	+ 48"
8	Joaquim Silva (POR)	Efapel Cycling	+ 48"
9	Mikel Bizkarra (ESP)	Euskaltel–Euskadi	+ 48"
10	Fernando Tercero (ESP)	Eolo–Kometa	+ 59"
