= Unai Iribar =

Spanish cyclist

Personal information
- Full name: Unai Iribar Jauregi
- Born: 12 June 1999 (age 27) Ibarra, Spain
- Height: 1.83 m (6 ft 0 in)
- Weight: 64 kg (141 lb)

Cycling career
- Sport: Cycling
- Current team: Equipo Kern Pharma
- Disciplines: Road; Track
- Role: Rider

Amateur teams
- 2018: Ampo–Goierriko T.B.
- 2019–2021: Laboral Kutxa

Professional teams
- 2021: Euskaltel–Euskadi (stagiaire)
- 2022–2023: Euskaltel–Euskadi
- 2024–: Equipo Kern Pharma

Unai Iribar Jauregi (born 12 June 1999) is a Spanish cyclist, who currently rides for UCI ProTeam Equipo Kern Pharma.

== Major results ==
=== Road ===
2017
1st Gipuzkoa Klasika
2021
1st Santikutz Klasika
2nd Overall Vuelta a Cantabria
3rd Road race, National Under-23 Championships
2024
3rd Overall Tour de Langkawi
9th Giro dell'Appennino

==== Grand Tour general classification results timeline ====
Grand Tour	2024
Giro d'Italia	—
Tour de France	—
Vuelta a España	83

Legend
—	Did not compete
DNF	Did not finish

=== Track ===
2016
1st Team pursuit, National Junior Championships
2017
National Junior Championships

1st Madison (with Xabier Azparren)
1st Team pursuit
2nd Individual pursuit
3rd Team sprint

3rd Elimination race, UEC European Junior Championships
2018
National Under-23 Championships

1st Omnium
1st Points race
2nd Team pursuit
3rd Madison
