= 2024 Vuelta a Asturias =

Spanish cycling race

2024 Vuelta Asturias
2024 UCI Europe Tour

Race details
- Dates: 26–28 April 2024
- Stages: 3
- Distance: 519.1 km (322.6 mi)
- Winning time: 12h 59' 04"

Results
Jersey awarded to the overall winner	Winner	Isaac del Toro (MEX)	(UAE Team Emirates)
	Second	Rafał Majka (POL)	(UAE Team Emirates)
	Third	Eric Antonio Fagúndez (URU)	(Burgos BH)
Jersey awarded to the points classification winner	Points	Isaac del Toro (MEX)	(UAE Team Emirates)
Jersey awarded to the mountains classification winner	Mountains	Ibon Ruiz (ESP)	(Equipo Kern Pharma)
Jersey awarded to the team classification winner	Team	UAE Team Emirates	

The 2024 Vuelta Asturias Julio Alvarez Mendo was a road cycling stage race that took place between 26 and 28 April 2024 in the Asturias region of northwestern Spain. It was the 66th edition of the Vuelta Asturias and was part of the 2024 UCI Europe Tour calendar as a category 2.1 event.

== Teams ==
Two UCI WorldTeams, six UCI ProTeams, and eight UCI Continental teams made up the sixteen teams that participated in the race. There was a total of 105 riders that started the race.

UCI WorldTeams

- Movistar Team
- UAE Team Emirates

UCI ProTeams

- Burgos BH
- Caja Rural–Seguros RGA
- Equipo Kern Pharma
- Euskaltel–Euskadi
- Polti–Kometa
- Team TotalEnergies

UCI Continental Teams

- ABTF Betão–Feirense
- Global 6 United
- Illes Balears Arabay Cycling
- MENtoRISE MLMsuperstars
- Petrolike
- Sabgal–Anicolor
- Sidi Ali–Unlock Team
- Victoria Sports Pro Cycling Team

== Route ==
Stage characteristics and winners
Stage	Date	Route	Distance	Type	Winner
1	28 April	Cangas del Narcea to Pola de Lena	179.1 km (111.3 mi)	Mountain stage	Isaac del Toro (MEX)
2	29 April	Ribera de Arriba to Ribadesella	200 km (120 mi)	Hilly stage	António Morgado (POR)
3	30 April	Benia de Onís to Oviedo	140 km (87 mi)	Hilly stage	Finn Fisher-Black (NZL)
Total			519.1 km (322.6 mi)		

== Stages ==
=== Stage 1 ===
26 April 2023 – Cangas del Narcea to Pola de Lena, 179.1 km (111.3 mi)

Stage 1 Result
Rank	Rider	Team	Time
1	Isaac del Toro (MEX)	UAE Team Emirates	4h 46' 14"
2	Rafał Majka (POL)	UAE Team Emirates	+ 1' 01"
3	Eric Antonio Fagúndez (URU)	Burgos BH	+ 1' 04"
4	Afonso Eulálio (POR)	ABTF Betão–Feirense	+ 1' 04"
5	José Manuel Díaz (ESP)	Burgos BH	+ 1' 15"
6	Fernando Barceló (ESP)	Caja Rural–Seguros RGA	+ 1' 40"
7	Jorge Gutiérrez (ESP)	Equipo Kern Pharma	+ 1' 54"
8	Alex Molenaar (NED)	Illes Balears Arabay Cycling	+ 2' 00"
9	Luis Ángel Maté (ESP)	Euskaltel–Euskadi	+ 2' 00"
10	Igor Arrieta (ESP)	UAE Team Emirates	+ 2' 00"

General classification after Stage 1
Rank	Rider	Team	Time
1	Isaac del Toro (MEX)	UAE Team Emirates	4h 46' 04"
2	Rafał Majka (POL)	UAE Team Emirates	+ 1' 05"
3	Eric Antonio Fagúndez (URU)	Burgos BH	+ 1' 10"
4	Afonso Eulálio (POR)	ABTF Betão–Feirense	+ 1' 14"
5	José Manuel Díaz (ESP)	Burgos BH	+ 1' 23"
6	Fernando Barceló (ESP)	Caja Rural–Seguros RGA	+ 1' 50"
7	Jorge Gutiérrez (ESP)	Equipo Kern Pharma	+ 2' 04"
8	Alex Molenaar (NED)	Illes Balears Arabay Cycling	+ 2' 10"
9	Luis Ángel Maté (ESP)	Euskaltel–Euskadi	+ 2' 10"
10	Igor Arrieta (ESP)	UAE Team Emirates	+ 2' 10"

=== Stage 2 ===
29 April 2023 – Ribera de Arriba to Ribadesella, 200 km (120 mi)

Stage 2 Result
Rank	Rider	Team	Time
1	António Morgado (POR)	UAE Team Emirates	4h 50' 18"
2	Albert Torres (ESP)	Movistar Team	+ 0"
3	Isaac del Toro (MEX)	UAE Team Emirates	+ 0"
4	Gonzalo Serrano (ESP)	Movistar Team	+ 0"
5	Jhonatan Restrepo (COL)	Polti–Kometa	+ 0"
6	Alex Molenaar (NED)	Illes Balears Arabay Cycling	+ 0"
7	Javier Serrano (ESP)	Polti–Kometa	+ 0"
8	Fernando Barceló (ESP)	Caja Rural–Seguros RGA	+ 0"
9	Xabier Berasategi (ESP)	Euskaltel–Euskadi	+ 0"
10	Joan Bou (ESP)	Euskaltel–Euskadi	+ 0"

General classification after Stage 2
Rank	Rider	Team	Time
1	Isaac del Toro (MEX)	UAE Team Emirates	9h 36' 18"
2	Rafał Majka (POL)	UAE Team Emirates	+ 1' 09"
3	Eric Antonio Fagúndez (URU)	Burgos BH	+ 1' 14"
4	José Manuel Díaz (ESP)	Burgos BH	+ 1' 16"
5	Afonso Eulálio (POR)	ABTF Betão–Feirense	+ 1' 18"
6	Fernando Barceló (ESP)	Caja Rural–Seguros RGA	+ 1' 54"
7	Jorge Gutiérrez (ESP)	Equipo Kern Pharma	+ 2' 08"
8	Alex Molenaar (NED)	Illes Balears Arabay Cycling	+ 2' 14"
9	Jordi López (ESP)	Equipo Kern Pharma	+ 2' 14"
10	Luis Ángel Maté (ESP)	Euskaltel–Euskadi	+ 2' 14"

=== Stage 3 ===
30 April 2023 – Benia de Onís to Oviedo, 140 km (87 mi)

Stage 3 Result
Rank	Rider	Team	Time
1	Finn Fisher-Black (NZL)	UAE Team Emirates	3h 22' 52"
2	Isaac del Toro (MEX)	UAE Team Emirates	+ 0"
3	Jordan Jegat (FRA)	Team TotalEnergies	+ 0"
4	Fernando Barceló (ESP)	Caja Rural–Seguros RGA	+ 0"
5	Pelayo Sánchez (ESP)	Movistar Team	+ 0"
6	Eric Antonio Fagúndez (URU)	Burgos BH	+ 0"
7	Alex Molenaar (NED)	Illes Balears Arabay Cycling	+ 0"
8	Rafał Majka (POL)	UAE Team Emirates	+ 0"
9	Samuel Fernández (ESP)	Caja Rural–Seguros RGA	+ 0"
10	José Félix Parra (ESP)	Equipo Kern Pharma	+ 0"

Final general classification
Rank	Rider	Team	Time
1	Isaac del Toro (MEX)	UAE Team Emirates	12h 59' 04"
2	Rafał Majka (POL)	UAE Team Emirates	+ 1' 15"
3	Eric Antonio Fagúndez (URU)	Burgos BH	+ 1' 20"
4	José Manuel Díaz (ESP)	Burgos BH	+ 1' 22"
5	Afonso Eulálio (POR)	ABTF Betão–Feirense	+ 1' 48"
6	Fernando Barceló (ESP)	Caja Rural–Seguros RGA	+ 2' 00"
7	Alex Molenaar (NED)	Illes Balears Arabay Cycling	+ 2' 20"
8	Pelayo Sánchez (ESP)	Movistar Team	+ 2' 20"
9	Igor Arrieta (ESP)	UAE Team Emirates	+ 2' 20"
10	Diego Camargo (COL)	Petrolike	+ 2' 32"

== Classification leadership table ==
Classification leadership by stage
Stage	Winner	General classification	Points classification	Mountains classification	Team classification
1	Isaac del Toro	Isaac del Toro	Isaac del Toro	Ibon Ruiz	UAE Team Emirates
2	António Morgado	Isaac del Toro	Isaac del Toro	Ibon Ruiz	UAE Team Emirates
3	Finn Fisher-Black	Isaac del Toro	Isaac del Toro	Ibon Ruiz	UAE Team Emirates
Final		Isaac del Toro	Isaac del Toro	Ibon Ruiz	UAE Team Emirates
