= Max Poole =

British cyclist (born 2003)

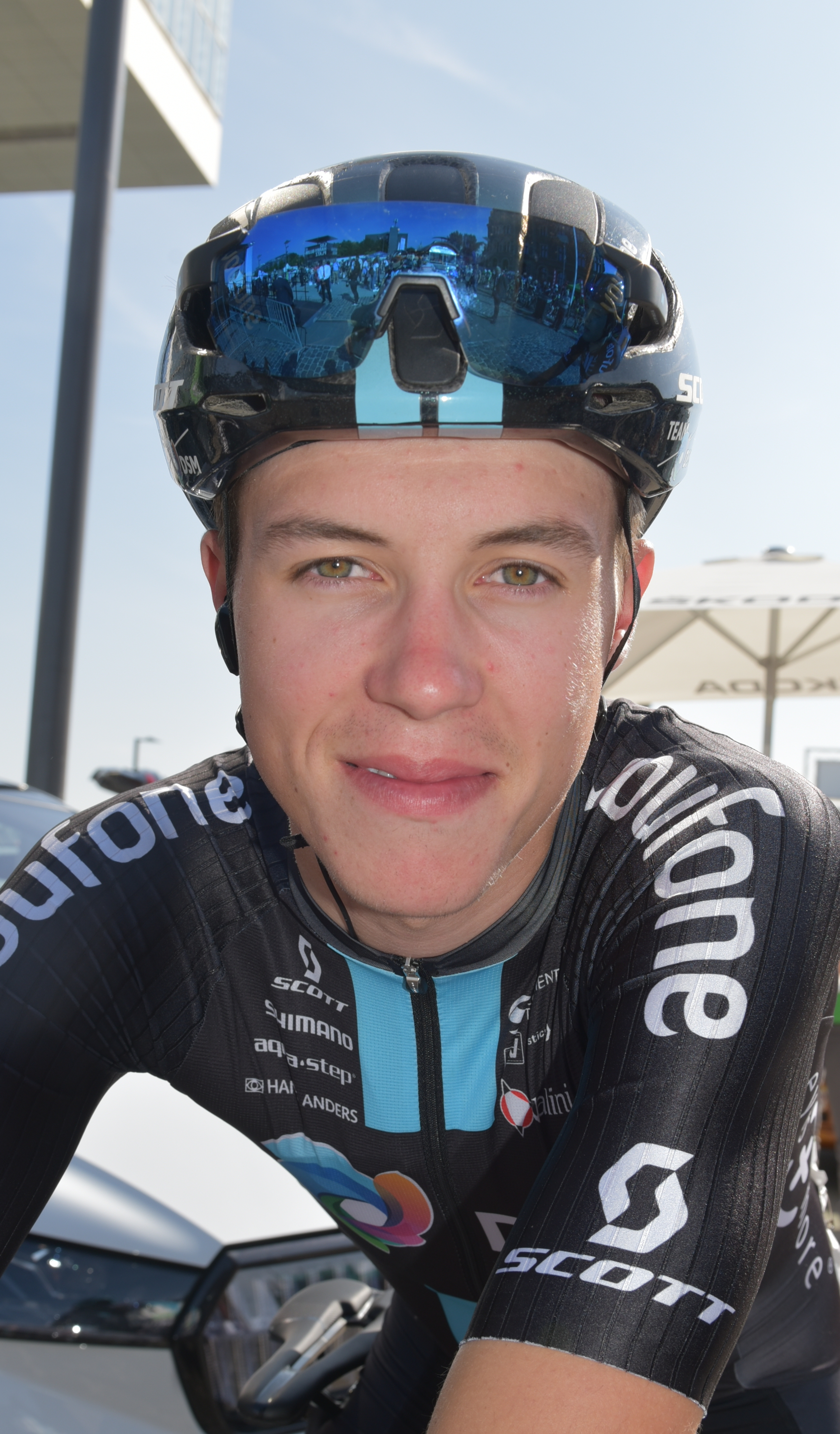
- Poole, Rund um Köln, 2022

Personal information
- Full name: Max David Poole
- Born: 1 March 2003 (age 23) Scunthorpe, England
- Height: 1.85 m (6 ft 1 in)

Cycling career
- Sport: Cycling
- Current team: Team Picnic–PostNL
- Discipline: Road
- Role: Rider
- Rider type: Climber

Professional teams
- 2022: Development Team DSM
- 2023–: Team dsm–firmenich

Major wins
- Grand Tours Vuelta a España 1 TTT stage (2023) Stage races Tour de Langkawi (2024)

Max David Poole (born 1 March 2003) is a British cyclist, who currently rides for UCI WorldTeam Team Picnic–PostNL.

== Career ==
As a junior rider, Poole won the British National Road Race Championships and the Tour of Yorkshire Juniors in 2021. In 2022, he joined the Development Team DSM, and competed up a level in several professional races with Team dsm–firmenich, before joining them full time the following season. In 2023, he competed in his first Grand Tour: the Vuelta a España, winning the stage one team time trial. He saw success in other stage races as well, taking fourth in the Tour de Romandie and the Tour de Hongrie and winning the young rider classification in the Tour of the Alps.

Poole started the 2024 season at the UAE Tour, placing 7th overall. He fractured his elbow in March and did not return to competition until the Vuelta a Burgos in August, where he finished 2nd. He again competed in the Vuelta a España, finishing second on one stage and third on three others. In October, he took his first professional win on stage three of the Tour de Langkawi. In the process, he also took the race lead, which he held until the end.

== Major results ==
2019
1st Coppa d'Oro
2020
4th Overall La Philippe Gilbert Juniors
5th Overall Grand Prix Rüebliland
2021
1st Road race, National Junior Road Championships
1st Overall Tour of Yorkshire Juniors
2nd Overall La Philippe Gilbert Juniors

1st Mountains classification
1st Stage 2

7th Paris–Roubaix Juniors
9th Road race, UCI Junior Road World Championships
10th Overall Grand Prix Rüebliland

1st Points classification
1st Stage 1

2022
5th Giro del Medio Brenta
6th Overall Giro della Valle d'Aosta
7th Overall Arctic Race of Norway
10th Overall Sazka Tour
2023
1st Stage 1 (TTT) Vuelta a España
1st Young rider classification, Tour of the Alps
4th Overall Tour de Romandie
4th Overall Tour de Hongrie
2024 (2 pro wins)
1st Overall Tour de Langkawi

1st Stage 3

2nd Overall Vuelta a Burgos

1st Young rider classification

7th Overall UAE Tour
2025
7th Overall Tour of the Alps

1st Young rider classification

=== Grand Tour general classification results timeline ===
Grand Tour	2023	2024	2025
Giro d'Italia	—	—	11
Tour de France	—	—	
Vuelta a España	49	35	

Legend
—	Did not compete
DNF	Did not finish
