= 2024 Vuelta a España =

79th edition of the Vuelta a España

2024 UCI World Tour, race 28 of 35
- Route of the 2024 Vuelta a España

Race details
- Dates: 17 August – 8 September
- Stages: 21
- Distance: 3,304.3 km (2,053.2 mi)
- Winning time: 81h 49' 18"

Results
Jersey awarded to the overall winner	Winner	Primož Roglič (SLO)	(Red Bull–Bora–Hansgrohe)
	Second	Ben O'Connor (AUS)	(Decathlon–AG2R La Mondiale)
	Third	Enric Mas (ESP)	(Movistar Team)
Jersey awarded to the points classification winner	Points	Kaden Groves (AUS)	(Alpecin–Deceuninck)
Jersey awarded to the mountains classification winner	Mountains	Jay Vine (AUS)	(UAE Team Emirates)
Jersey awarded to the youth classification winner	Youth	Mattias Skjelmose (DEN)	(Lidl–Trek)
Jersey awarded to the combativity classification winner	Combativity	Marc Soler (ESP)	(UAE Team Emirates)
Jersey awarded to the team classification winner	Team	(United Arab Emirates) UAE Team Emirates	

The 2024 Vuelta a España was a three-week cycling race that took place in Portugal and Spain between 17 August and 8 September. It was the 79th edition of the Vuelta a España and the third and final grand tour of the 2024 men's road cycling season. The race departed from Lisbon and finished in Madrid.

The race was won by Primož Roglič of team Red Bull–Bora–Hansgrohe for a record-tying 4th time. Roglič took the lead in the general classification on stage 3 before relinquishing it to Ben O'Connor (Decathlon CMA CGM Team), who wore the maillot rojo from stages 6 to 19. Roglič won stages 4, 8, and 19, and on stage 19 also regained the lead in the GC. O'Connor held onto second place, his best finish in a grand tour, while Enric Mas of the Movistar Team finished in third.

Wout van Aert (Visma–Lease a Bike) and Kaden Groves (Alpecin–Premier Tech) won three stages, with Groves winning the points classification after van Aert abandoned the race during stage 16 after crashing during a slippery descent. Groves finished with 226 points, a comfortable advantage over Roglič, his nearest opponent, who had 140. Van Aert had 291 points before abandoning.

Jay Vine and Marc Soler of UAE Team Emirates XRG won the mountains classification and the combativity award, respectively. Their team also won the team classification. Mattias Skjelmose of Lidl–Trek won the young rider classification.

== Teams ==
22 teams took part in the race. All 18 UCI WorldTeams were automatically invited. They were joined by 4 UCI ProTeams: the two highest placed UCI ProTeams in 2023 (Lotto–Dstny and Israel–Premier Tech), along with Equipo Kern Pharma and Euskaltel–Euskadi who were selected by Amaury Sport Organisation (ASO), the organisers of the Vuelta.

Soudal–Quick-Step chose to compete under a different name from the rest of the season: they became T-Rex Quick-Step, using the name of a product made by Soudal, their normal sponsor.

UCI WorldTeams

- Alpecin–Deceuninck
- Arkéa–B&B Hotels
- Astana Qazaqstan Team
- Cofidis
- Decathlon–AG2R La Mondiale
- EF Education–EasyPost
- Groupama–FDJ
- Ineos Grenadiers
- Intermarché–Wanty
- Lidl–Trek
- Movistar Team
- Red Bull–Bora–Hansgrohe
- T-Rex Quick-Step
- Team Bahrain Victorious
- Team dsm–firmenich PostNL
- Team Jayco–AlUla
- Visma–Lease a Bike
- UAE Team Emirates

UCI ProTeams

- Equipo Kern Pharma
- Euskaltel–Euskadi
- Israel–Premier Tech
- Lotto–Dstny

== Route and stages ==
Stage characteristics and winners
Stage	Date	Course	Distance	Type	Winner
1	17 August	Lisbon (Portugal) to Oeiras (Portugal)	12 km (7.5 mi)	Individual time trial	Brandon McNulty (USA)
2	18 August	Cascais (Portugal) to Ourém (Portugal)	194 km (121 mi)	Hilly stage	Kaden Groves (AUS)
3	19 August	Lousã (Portugal) to Castelo Branco (Portugal)	191.2 km (118.8 mi)	Hilly stage	Wout van Aert (BEL)
4	20 August	Plasencia to Pico Villuercas	170.5 km (105.9 mi)	Mountain stage	Primož Roglič (SLO)
5	21 August	Fuente del Maestre to Sevilla	177 km (110 mi)	Flat stage	Pavel Bittner (CZE)
6	22 August	Jerez de la Frontera to Yunquera	185.5 km (115.3 mi)	Mountain stage	Ben O'Connor (AUS)
7	23 August	Archidona to Córdoba	180.5 km (112.2 mi)	Hilly stage	Wout van Aert (BEL)
8	24 August	Úbeda to Cazorla	159 km (99 mi)	Medium-mountain stage	Primož Roglič (SLO)
9	25 August	Motril to Granada	178.5 km (110.9 mi)	Mountain stage	Adam Yates (GBR)
	26 August	Vigo	Rest day		
10	27 August	Ponteareas to Baiona	160 km (99 mi)	Mountain stage	Wout van Aert (BEL)
11	28 August	Padrón to Padrón	166.5 km (103.5 mi)	Medium-mountain stage	Eddie Dunbar (IRL)
12	29 August	Orense to Estación de Montaña de Manzaneda	137.5 km (85.4 mi)	Hilly stage	Pablo Castrillo (ESP)
13	30 August	Lugo to Puerto de Ancares	176 km (109 mi)	Mountain stage	Michael Woods (CAN)
14	31 August	Villafranca del Bierzo to Villablino	200.5 km (124.6 mi)	Medium-mountain stage	Kaden Groves (AUS)
15	1 September	Infiesto to Valgrande-Pajares	143 km (89 mi)	Mountain stage	Pablo Castrillo (ESP)
	2 September	Oviedo	Rest day		
16	3 September	Luanco to Lagos de Covadonga	181.5 km (112.8 mi)	Mountain stage	Marc Soler (ESP)
17	4 September	Arnuero to Santander	141.5 km (87.9 mi)	Medium-mountain stage	Kaden Groves (AUS)
18	5 September	Vitoria-Gasteiz to Maeztu	179.5 km (111.5 mi)	Medium-mountain stage	Urko Berrade (ESP)
19	6 September	Logroño to Alto de Moncalvillo	173.5 km (107.8 mi)	Hilly stage	Primož Roglič (SLO)
20	7 September	Villarcayo to Picón Blanco	172 km (107 mi)	Mountain stage	Eddie Dunbar (IRL)
21	8 September	Distrito Telefónica to Madrid	24.6 km (15.3 mi)	Individual time trial	Stefan Küng (SUI)
Total			3,304.3 km (2,053.2 mi)		

== Pre-race favourites ==
The general classification competition was expected to be more open than the preceding Giro d'Italia or Tour de France. Media analysis focused on the absence of three members of the Big Four: Tadej Pogačar, Jonas Vingegaard, and Remco Evenepoel. The remaining member, Primož Roglič, was widely considered a pre-race favourite, alongside 2023 Vuelta a España winner Sepp Kuss. Other expected contenders for the podium were Adam Yates, João Almeida, Carlos Rodríguez, Mikel Landa, Thymen Arensman, Ben O'Connor, and Enric Mas.

== Classification leadership ==
Classification leadership by stage
Stage	Winner	General classification	Points classification	Mountains classification	Young rider classification	Team classification	Combativity award
1	Brandon McNulty	Brandon McNulty	Brandon McNulty (Note: On stage 2, Wout van Aert, who was third in the points classification, wore the green jersey, because first-placed Brandon McNulty wore the red jersey as the leader of the general classification and second-placed Mathias Vacek wore the white jersey as the leader of the young rider classification.)	not awarded (Note: On stage 2, Stefan Küng, who was fourth in the general classification, wore the blue polkadot jersey.)	Mathias Vacek	UAE Team Emirates	not awarded
2	Kaden Groves	Wout van Aert	Kaden Groves	Stefan Küng	Mathias Vacek	UAE Team Emirates	Luis Ángel Maté
3	Wout van Aert	Wout van Aert	Wout van Aert (Note: On stage 4, Kaden Groves, who was second in the points classification, wore the green jersey, because first-placed Wout van Aert wore the red jersey as the general classification leader.)	Luis Ángel Maté	Mathias Vacek	UAE Team Emirates	Xabier Isasa
4	Primož Roglič	Primož Roglič	Wout van Aert	Sylvain Moniquet	Antonio Tiberi	UAE Team Emirates	Pablo Castrillo
5	Pavel Bittner	Primož Roglič	Wout van Aert	Sylvain Moniquet	Antonio Tiberi	UAE Team Emirates	Ibon Ruiz
6	Ben O'Connor	Ben O'Connor	Wout van Aert	Sylvain Moniquet	Florian Lipowitz	Decathlon–AG2R La Mondiale	Ben O'Connor
7	Wout van Aert	Ben O'Connor	Wout van Aert	Sylvain Moniquet	Antonio Tiberi	Decathlon–AG2R La Mondiale	Xabier Isasa
8	Primož Roglič	Ben O'Connor	Wout van Aert	Primož Roglič	Antonio Tiberi	Decathlon–AG2R La Mondiale	Oier Lazkano
9	Adam Yates	Ben O'Connor	Wout van Aert	Adam Yates	Florian Lipowitz	UAE Team Emirates	Adam Yates
10	Wout van Aert	Ben O'Connor	Wout van Aert	Adam Yates	Florian Lipowitz	UAE Team Emirates	Wout van Aert
11	Eddie Dunbar	Ben O'Connor	Wout van Aert	Adam Yates	Carlos Rodriguez	UAE Team Emirates	Xandro Meurisse
12	Pablo Castrillo	Ben O'Connor	Wout van Aert	Adam Yates	Carlos Rodriguez	UAE Team Emirates	Pablo Castrillo
13	Michael Woods	Ben O'Connor	Wout van Aert	Wout van Aert (Note: On stages 14–15, Marc Soler, who was second in the mountains classification, wore the polkadot jersey, because first-placed Wout van Aert wore the green jersey as the points classification leader. For the same reason, Jay Vine wore the jersey on stage 16.)	Carlos Rodriguez	UAE Team Emirates	Wout van Aert
14	Kaden Groves	Ben O'Connor	Wout van Aert	Wout van Aert	Carlos Rodriguez	UAE Team Emirates	Jhonatan Narváez
15	Pablo Castrillo	Ben O'Connor	Wout van Aert	Wout van Aert	Florian Lipowitz	UAE Team Emirates	Jay Vine
16	Marc Soler	Ben O'Connor	Kaden Groves	Jay Vine	Carlos Rodriguez	UAE Team Emirates	Marc Soler
17	Kaden Groves	Ben O'Connor	Kaden Groves	Jay Vine	Carlos Rodriguez	UAE Team Emirates	Xabier Isasa
18	Urko Berrade	Ben O'Connor	Kaden Groves	Marc Soler	Carlos Rodriguez	UAE Team Emirates	Marc Soler
19	Primož Roglič	Primož Roglič	Kaden Groves	Marc Soler	Mattias Skjelmose	UAE Team Emirates	Isaac del Toro
20	Eddie Dunbar	Primož Roglič	Kaden Groves	Jay Vine	Mattias Skjelmose	UAE Team Emirates	Marc Soler
21	Stefan Küng	Primož Roglič	Kaden Groves	Jay Vine	Mattias Skjelmose	UAE Team Emirates	not awarded
Final		Primož Roglič	Kaden Groves	Jay Vine	Mattias Skjelmose	UAE Team Emirates	Marc Soler

== Classification standings ==
Legend
Denotes the winner of the general classification	Denotes the winner of the young rider classification
Denotes the winner of the points classification	Denotes the winner of the team classification
Denotes the winner of the mountains classification	Denotes the winner of the combativity award

=== General classification ===
Final general classification (1–10)
Rank	Rider	Team	Time
1	Primož Roglič (SLO)	Red Bull–Bora–Hansgrohe	81h 49' 18"
2	Ben O'Connor (AUS)	Decathlon–AG2R La Mondiale	+ 2' 36"
3	Enric Mas (ESP)	Movistar Team	+ 3' 13"
4	Richard Carapaz (ECU)	EF Education–EasyPost	+ 4' 02"
5	Mattias Skjelmose (DEN)	Lidl–Trek	+5' 49"
6	David Gaudu (FRA)	Groupama–FDJ	+ 6' 32"
7	Florian Lipowitz (GER)	Red Bull–Bora–Hansgrohe	+ 7' 05"
8	Mikel Landa (ESP)	Soudal–Quick-Step	+ 8' 48"
9	Pavel Sivakov (FRA)	UAE Team Emirates	+ 10' 04"
10	Carlos Rodríguez (ESP)	Ineos Grenadiers	+ 11' 19"

Final general classification (11–135)
Rank	Rider	Team	Time
11	Eddie Dunbar (IRL)	Team Jayco–AlUla	+ 14' 40"
12	Adam Yates (GBR)	UAE Team Emirates	+ 15' 40"
13	Cristián Rodríguez (ESP)	Arkéa–B&B Hotels	+ 19' 48"
14	Sepp Kuss (USA)	Visma–Lease a Bike	+ 20' 25"
15	Guillaume Martin (FRA)	Cofidis	+ 31' 34"
16	Lorenzo Fortunato (ITA)	Astana Qazaqstan Team	+ 40' 43"
17	José Félix Parra (ESP)	Equipo Kern Pharma	+ 51' 33"
18	Aleksandr Vlasov	Red Bull–Bora–Hansgrohe	+ 55' 05"
19	Steven Kruijswijk (NED)	Visma–Lease a Bike	+ 1h 01' 53"
20	Clément Berthet (FRA)	Decathlon–AG2R La Mondiale	+ 1h 04' 13"
21	Quentin Pacher (FRA)	Groupama–FDJ	+ 1h 09' 30"
22	Jack Haig (AUS)	Team Bahrain Victorious	+ 1h 11' 45"
23	Mattia Cattaneo (ITA)	Soudal–Quick-Step	+ 1h 13' 28"
24	Óscar Rodríguez (ESP)	Ineos Grenadiers	+ 1h 16' 05"
25	Attila Valter (HUN)	Visma–Lease a Bike	+ 1h 22' 31"
26	Mikel Bizkarra (ESP)	Euskaltel–Euskadi	+ 1h 37' 38"
27	Einer Rubio (COL)	Movistar Team	+ 1h 39' 22"
28	Louis Meintjes (RSA)	Intermarché–Wanty	+ 1h 39' 37"
29	Felix Gall (AUT)	Decathlon–AG2R La Mondiale	+ 1h 42' 00"
30	Matthew Riccitello (USA)	Israel–Premier Tech	+ 1h 46' 37"
31	Nairo Quintana (COL)	Movistar Team	+ 1h 49' 11"
32	Carlos Verona (ESP)	Lidl–Trek	+ 1h 50' 59"
33	Sam Oomen (NED)	Lidl–Trek	+ 1h 51' 52"
34	George Bennett (NZL)	Israel–Premier Tech	+ 1h 52' 43"
35	Max Poole (GBR)	Team dsm–firmenich PostNL	+ 1h 56' 35"
36	Isaac del Toro (MEX)	UAE Team Emirates	+ 1h 57' 27"
37	Ion Izagirre (ESP)	Cofidis	+ 1h 59' 25"
38	Giovanni Aleotti (ITA)	Red Bull–Bora–Hansgrohe	+ 2h 00' 03"
39	Stefan Küng (SUI)	Groupama–FDJ	+ 2h 01' 27"
40	Harold Tejada (COL)	Astana Qazaqstan Team	+ 2h 09' 03"
41	Marc Soler (ESP)	UAE Team Emirates	+ 2h 10' 37"
42	Urko Berrade (ESP)	Equipo Kern Pharma	+ 2h 10' 47"
43	Roger Adrià (ESP)	Red Bull–Bora–Hansgrohe	+ 2h 12' 41"
44	William Junior Lecerf (BEL)	Soudal–Quick-Step	+ 2h 15' 24"
45	Valentin Paret-Peintre (FRA)	Decathlon–AG2R La Mondiale	+ 2h 17' 55"
46	Jefferson Alexander Cepeda (ECU)	EF Education–EasyPost	+ 2h 21' 31"
47	Simon Guglielmi (FRA)	Arkéa–B&B Hotels	+ 2h 22' 12"
48	Gianmarco Garofoli (ITA)	Astana Qazaqstan Team	+ 2h 22' 25"
49	Mauri Vansevenant (BEL)	Soudal–Quick-Step	+ 2h 24' 54"
50	Jhonatan Narváez (ECU)	Ineos Grenadiers	+ 2h 26' 46"
51	Gotzon Martín (ESP)	Euskaltel–Euskadi	+ 2h 27' 06"
52	Robert Gesink (NED)	Visma–Lease a Bike	+ 2h 34' 22"
53	Marco Frigo (ITA)	Israel–Premier Tech	+ 2h 36' 15"
54	Brandon McNulty (USA)	UAE Team Emirates	+ 2h 37' 44"
55	Xandro Meurisse (BEL)	Alpecin–Deceuninck	+ 2h 38' 10"
56	Filippo Zana (ITA)	Team Jayco–AlUla	+ 2h 39' 10"
57	Jay Vine (AUS)	UAE Team Emirates	+ 2h 42' 13"
58	Pau Miquel (ESP)	Equipo Kern Pharma	+ 2h 44' 50"
59	Louis Vervaeke (BEL)	Soudal–Quick-Step	+ 2h 47' 05"
60	Torstein Træen (NOR)	Team Bahrain Victorious	+ 2h 50' 48"
61	Mathias Vacek (CZE)	Lidl–Trek	+ 2h 51' 36"
62	Tao Geoghegan Hart (GBR)	Lidl–Trek	+ 2h 51' 50"
63	Martijn Tusveld (NED)	Team dsm–firmenich PostNL	+ 2h 54' 38"
64	Pablo Castrillo (ESP)	Equipo Kern Pharma	+ 3h 00' 12"
65	Luis Ángel Maté (ESP)	Euskaltel–Euskadi	+ 3h 02' 34"
66	Filippo Baroncini (ITA)	UAE Team Emirates	+ 3h 06' 20"
67	James Knox (GBR)	Soudal–Quick-Step	+ 3h 07' 33"
68	Chris Hamilton (AUS)	Team dsm–firmenich PostNL	+ 3h 08' 16"
69	Bruno Armirail (FRA)	Decathlon–AG2R La Mondiale	+ 3h 09' 03"
70	Carlos Canal (ESP)	Movistar Team	+ 3h 09' 06"
71	Mauro Schmid (SUI)	Team Jayco–AlUla	+ 3h 10' 41"
72	Joan Bou (ESP)	Euskaltel–Euskadi	+ 3h 11' 05"
73	Nelson Oliveira (POR)	Movistar Team	+ 3h 11' 45"
74	Dylan Teuns (BEL)	Israel–Premier Tech	+ 3h 12' 45"
75	Darren Rafferty (IRL)	EF Education–EasyPost	+ 3h 12' 47"
76	Mathis Le Berre (FRA)	Arkéa–B&B Hotels	+ 3h 23' 22"
77	Jonas Gregaard (DEN)	Lotto–Dstny	+ 3h 25' 36"
78	Harry Sweeny (AUS)	EF Education–EasyPost	+ 3h 27' 12"
79	Laurens Huys (BEL)	Arkéa–B&B Hotels	+ 3h 27' 30"
80	Quinten Hermans (BEL)	Alpecin–Deceuninck	+ 3h 27' 33"
81	Vito Braet (BEL)	Intermarché–Wanty	+ 3h 32' 34"
82	Thomas Champion (FRA)	Cofidis	+ 3h 36' 16"
83	Unai Iribar (ESP)	Equipo Kern Pharma	+ 3h 37' 42"
84	Gijs Leemreize (NED)	Team dsm–firmenich PostNL	+ 3h 37' 54"
85	Jesús Herrada (ESP)	Cofidis	+ 3h 39' 38"
86	Eduardo Sepúlveda (ARG)	Lotto–Dstny	+ 3h 39' 48"
87	Fran Miholjević (CRO)	Team Bahrain Victorious	+ 3h 42' 50"
88	Thomas De Gendt (BEL)	Lotto–Dstny	+ 3h 45' 35"
89	Łukasz Owsian (POL)	Arkéa–B&B Hotels	+ 3h 45' 45"
90	Simone Petilli (ITA)	Intermarché–Wanty	+ 3h 46' 39"
91	Arjen Livyns (BEL)	Lotto–Dstny	+ 3h 51' 39"
92	Oier Lazkano (ESP)	Movistar Team	+ 3h 52' 00"
93	Otto Vergaerde (BEL)	Lidl–Trek	+ 3h 53' 02"
94	Reuben Thompson (NZL)	Groupama–FDJ	+ 3h 55' 28"
95	Brandon Rivera (COL)	Ineos Grenadiers	+ 3h 55' 58"
96	Juri Hollmann (GER)	Alpecin–Deceuninck	+ 3h 57' 33"
97	Lorenzo Germani (ITA)	Groupama–FDJ	+ 3h 59' 24"
98	James Shaw (GBR)	EF Education–EasyPost	+ 4h 00' 47"
99	Jorge Gutiérrez (ESP)	Equipo Kern Pharma	+ 4h 02' 04"
100	Kaden Groves (AUS)	Alpecin–Deceuninck	+ 4h 05' 32"
101	Ibon Ruiz (ESP)	Equipo Kern Pharma	+ 4h 06' 57"
102	Xabier Berasategi (ESP)	Euskaltel–Euskadi	+ 4h 08' 31"
103	Felix Engelhardt (GER)	Team Jayco–AlUla	+ 4h 09' 17"
104	Xabier Isasa (ESP)	Euskaltel–Euskadi	+ 4h 09' 31"
105	Luca Vergallito (ITA)	Alpecin–Deceuninck	+ 4h 11' 26"
106	Santiago Umba (COL)	Astana Qazaqstan Team	+ 4h 11' 48"
107	Kim Heiduk (GER)	Ineos Grenadiers	+ 4h 12' 43"
108	Geoffrey Bouchard (FRA)	Decathlon–AG2R La Mondiale	+ 4h 15' 26"
109	Victor Lafay (FRA)	Decathlon–AG2R La Mondiale	+ 4h 15' 45"
110	Sylvain Moniquet (BEL)	Lotto–Dstny	+ 4h 18' 08"
111	Victor Campenaerts (BEL)	Lotto–Dstny	+ 4h 19' 08"
112	Jorge Arcas (ESP)	Movistar Team	+ 4h 21' 42"
113	Nadav Raisberg (ISR)	Israel–Premier Tech	+ 4h 25' 35"
114	Antonio Jesús Soto (ESP)	Equipo Kern Pharma	+ 4h 28' 52"
115	Pavel Bittner (CZE)	Team dsm–firmenich PostNL	+ 4h 31' 33"
116	Edward Planckaert (BEL)	Alpecin–Deceuninck	+ 4h 33' 11"
117	Sven Erik Bystrøm (NOR)	Groupama–FDJ	+ 4h 34' 06"
118	Owain Doull (GBR)	EF Education–EasyPost	+ 4h 36' 34"
119	Edoardo Affini (ITA)	Visma–Lease a Bike	+ 4h 36' 53"
120	Kasper Asgreen (DEN)	Soudal–Quick-Step	+ 4h 39' 48"
121	Jasha Sütterlin (GER)	Team Bahrain Victorious	+ 4h 42' 07"
122	Arne Marit (BEL)	Intermarché–Wanty	+ 4h 42' 18"
123	Riley Sheehan (USA)	Israel–Premier Tech	+ 4h 45' 08"
124	Gleb Brussenskiy (KAZ)	Astana Qazaqstan Team	+ 4h 45' 35"
125	Alessandro De Marchi (ITA)	Team Jayco–AlUla	+ 4h 53' 56"
126	Maurice Ballerstedt (GER)	Alpecin–Deceuninck	+ 4h 55' 15"
127	Casper Pedersen (DEN)	Soudal–Quick-Step	+ 5h 01' 24"
128	Nicolas Vinokurov (KAZ)	Astana Qazaqstan Team	+ 5h 02' 17"
129	Enzo Leijnse (NED)	Team dsm–firmenich PostNL	+ 5h 02' 45"
130	Oscar Riesebeek (NED)	Alpecin–Deceuninck	+ 5h 04' 06"
131	Julius van den Berg (NED)	Team dsm–firmenich PostNL	+ 5h 04' 41"
132	Thibault Guernalec (FRA)	Arkéa–B&B Hotels	+ 5h 04' 48"
133	Kamil Gradek (POL)	Team Bahrain Victorious	+ 5h 14' 00"
134	Ide Schelling (NED)	Astana Qazaqstan Team	+ 5h 19' 49"
135	Tim Naberman (NED)	Team dsm–firmenich PostNL	+ 5h 21' 03"

=== Points classification ===
Final points classification (1–10)
Rank	Rider	Team	Points
1	Kaden Groves (AUS)	Alpecin–Deceuninck	226
2	Primož Roglič (SLO)	Red Bull–Bora–Hansgrohe	140
3	Max Poole (GBR)	Team dsm–firmenich PostNL	118
4	Pablo Castrillo (ESP)	Equipo Kern Pharma	117
5	Mathias Vacek (CZE)	Lidl–Trek	110
6	Pavel Bittner (CZE)	Team dsm–firmenich PostNL	106
7	Enric Mas (ESP)	Movistar Team	102
8	Mauro Schmid (SUI)	Team Jayco–AlUla	100
9	Stefan Küng (SUI)	Groupama–FDJ	99
10	Marc Soler (ESP)	UAE Team Emirates	98

=== Mountains classification ===
Final mountains classification (1–10)
Rank	Rider	Team	Points
1	Jay Vine (AUS)	UAE Team Emirates	78
2	Marc Soler (ESP)	UAE Team Emirates	76
3	Pablo Castrillo (ESP)	Equipo Kern Pharma	43
4	Primož Roglič (SLO)	Red Bull–Bora–Hansgrohe	32
5	Marco Frigo (ITA)	Israel–Premier Tech	32
6	Enric Mas (ESP)	Movistar Team	28
7	Filippo Zana (ITA)	Team Jayco–AlUla	27
8	Pavel Sivakov (FRA)	UAE Team Emirates	26
9	Aleksandr Vlasov	Red Bull–Bora–Hansgrohe	25
10	David Gaudu (FRA)	Groupama–FDJ	24

=== Young rider classification ===
Final young rider classification (1–10)
Rank	Rider	Team	Time
1	Mattias Skjelmose (DEN)	Lidl–Trek	81h 55' 07"
2	Florian Lipowitz (GER)	Red Bull–Bora–Hansgrohe	+ 1' 16"
3	Carlos Rodríguez (ESP)	Ineos Grenadiers	+ 5' 30"
4	Matthew Riccitello (USA)	Israel–Premier Tech	+ 1h 40' 48"
5	Max Poole (GBR)	Team dsm–firmenich PostNL	+ 1h 50' 46"
6	Isaac del Toro (MEX)	UAE Team Emirates	+ 1h 51' 38"
7	Giovanni Aleotti (ITA)	Red Bull–Bora–Hansgrohe	+ 1h 54' 14"
8	William Junior Lecerf (BEL)	Soudal–Quick-Step	+ 2h 09' 35"
9	Valentin Paret-Peintre (FRA)	Decathlon–AG2R La Mondiale	+ 2h 12' 06"
10	Gianmarco Garofoli (ITA)	Astana Qazaqstan Team	+ 2h 16' 36"

=== Team classification ===
Final team classification (1–10)
Rank	Team	Time
1	(United Arab Emirates) UAE Team Emirates	245h 12' 58"
2	(Germany) Red Bull–Bora–Hansgrohe	+ 33' 53"
3	(France) Decathlon–AG2R La Mondiale	+ 1h 23' 09"
4	(Netherlands) Visma–Lease a Bike	+ 1h 53' 33"
5	(France) Groupama–FDJ	+ 2h 16' 51"
6	(Belgium) Soudal–Quick-Step	+ 2h 28' 28"
7	(Spain) Movistar Team	+ 2h 47' 49"
8	(United States) Lidl–Trek	+ 2h 47' 58"
9	(Spain) Equipo Kern Pharma	+ 2h 55' 08"
10	(United Kingdom) Ineos Grenadiers	+ 3h 18' 42"

Preceded by 2024 Tour de France	Grand Tour	Succeeded by 2025 Giro d'Italia
