= Fernando Tercero =

Spanish cyclist (born 2001)

Personal information
- Full name: Fernando Tercero López
- Born: 28 December 2001 (age 24) Valdepeñas, Spain
- Height: 1.82 m (6 ft 0 in)
- Weight: 65 kg (143 lb)

Cycling career
- Sport: Cycling
- Current team: Team Polti VisitMalta
- Discipline: Road
- Role: Rider
- Rider type: Climber

Amateur teams
- 2019: Kometa U19
- 2020–2022: Kometa U23

Professional team
- 2023–: Eolo–Kometa

Fernando Tercero López (born 28 December 2001) is a Spanish racing cyclist, who currently rides for UCI ProTeam Team Polti VisitMalta.

== Major results ==
2019
1st Trofeu 15 d'Abril
4th Time trial, National Junior Road Championships
2021
2nd Overall Ronde de l'Isard

1st Young rider classification

3rd Overall Tour of Galicia

1st Stage 3

3rd Overall Vuelta a Salamanca
2022
1st Overall Tour of Galicia

1st Stage 3

1st Aiztondo Klasika
3rd Time trial, National Under-23 Road Championships
8th Overall Giro d'Italia Giovani Under 23
8th Trofeo Piva
8th Giro del Belvedere
9th Overall Ronde de l'Isard
9th G.P. Palio del Recioto
2023
9th Overall Istrian Spring Trophy
10th Overall Vuelta a Asturias

1st Young rider classification

2024
4th Overall Tour de Langkawi
2025
6th Overall Tour de Langkawi
7th Mercan'Tour Classic
8th Overall Giro della Regione Friuli Venezia Giulia
9th Overall Giro d'Abruzzo
10th Giro della Romagna
