= Mikel Bizkarra =

Spanish bicycle racer (born 1989)

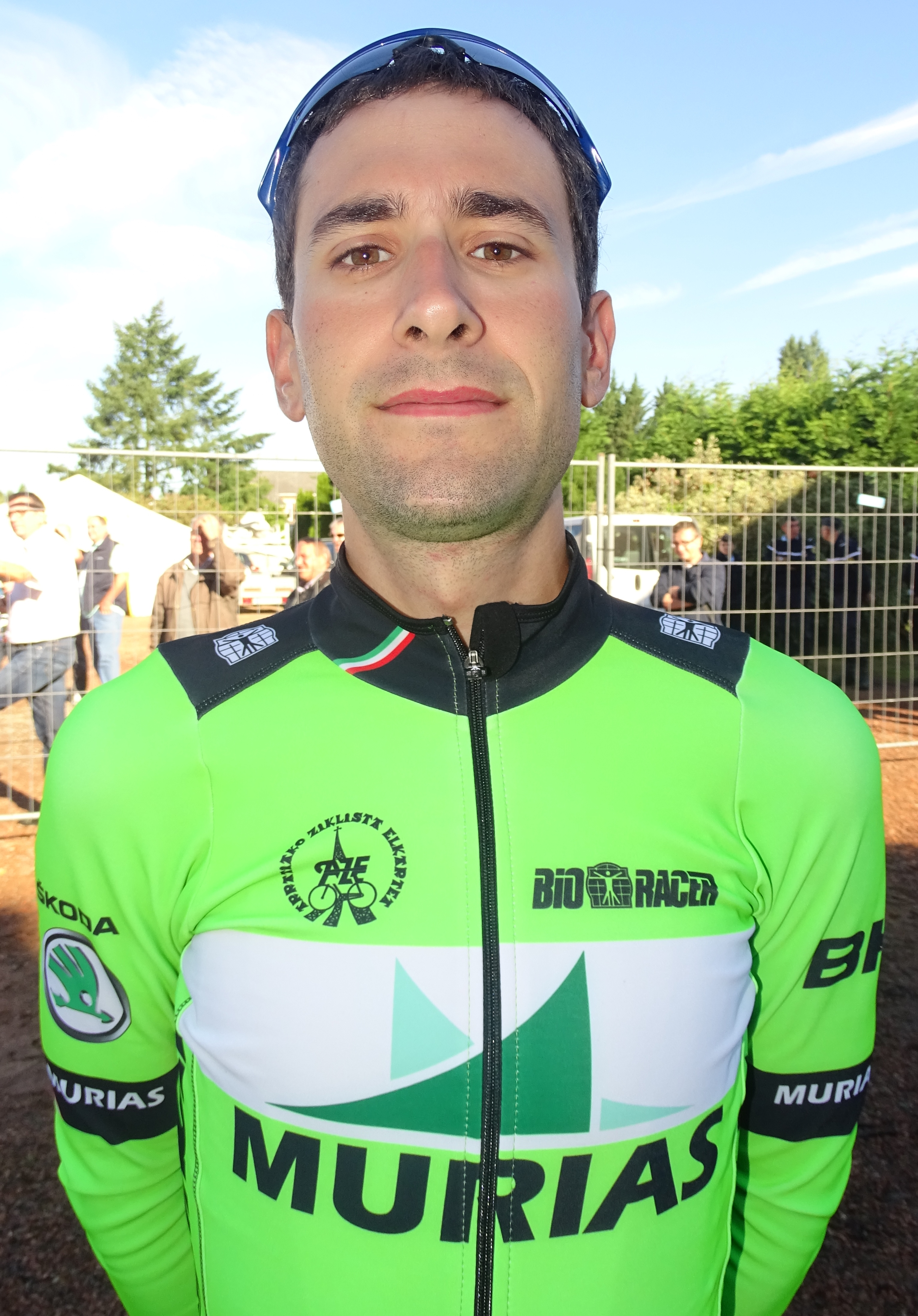
- Bizkarra in 2015

Personal information
- Full name: Mikel Bizkarra Etxegibel
- Born: 21 August 1989 (age 37) Mañaria, Spain
- Height: 1.65 m (5 ft 5 in)
- Weight: 53 kg (117 lb)

Cycling career
- Sport: Cycling
- Current team: Euskaltel–Euskadi
- Discipline: Road
- Role: Rider
- Rider type: Climber

Amateur teams
- 2008–2009: Ibaigane–Opel
- 2010: Naturgas Energía
- 2014: Gomur–Cantabria Deporte–Ferroatlántica

Professional teams
- 2011–2013: Orbea
- 2014: PinoRoad
- 2015–2019: Murias Taldea
- 2020–: Fundación–Orbea

Mikel Bizkarra Etxegibel (born 21 August 1989) is a Spanish cyclist, who currently rides for UCI ProTeam Euskaltel–Euskadi. In August 2018, he was named in the startlist for the Vuelta a España.

== Major results ==
2011
10th Overall Ronde de l'Isard
2013
7th Vuelta a la Comunidad de Madrid
10th Overall Tour of China I
2016
5th Overall Vuelta a Asturias
6th Overall Troféu Joaquim Agostinho
7th Overall Route du Sud
2017
4th Overall Tour du Gévaudan Languedoc-Roussillon
10th Boucles de l'Aulne
2018
3rd Overall Vuelta a Aragón

1st Mountains classification
1st Stage 3

2019
4th Giro dell'Appennino
2021
9th Overall Vuelta a Andalucía
10th Overall Route d'Occitanie
2022
4th Overall Vuelta a Asturias
2023
9th Overall Vuelta a Asturias
10th Mont Ventoux Dénivelé Challenge
2024
1st Mountains classification, Volta a la Comunitat Valenciana
5th Overall Volta a Portugal
9th Overall Tour de Langkawi
2025
1st Mountains classification, Route d'Occitanie
2026
7th Overall Tour of Turkiye

=== Grand Tour general classification results timeline ===
Grand Tour	2018	2019	2020	2021	2022	2023	2024
Giro d'Italia	—	—	—	—	—	—	—
Tour de France	—	—	—	—	—	—	—
Vuelta a España	17	48	—	46	28	—	26

Legend
—	Did not compete
DNF	Did not finish
