= Mattia Pinazzi =

Italian road and track cyclist (born 2001)

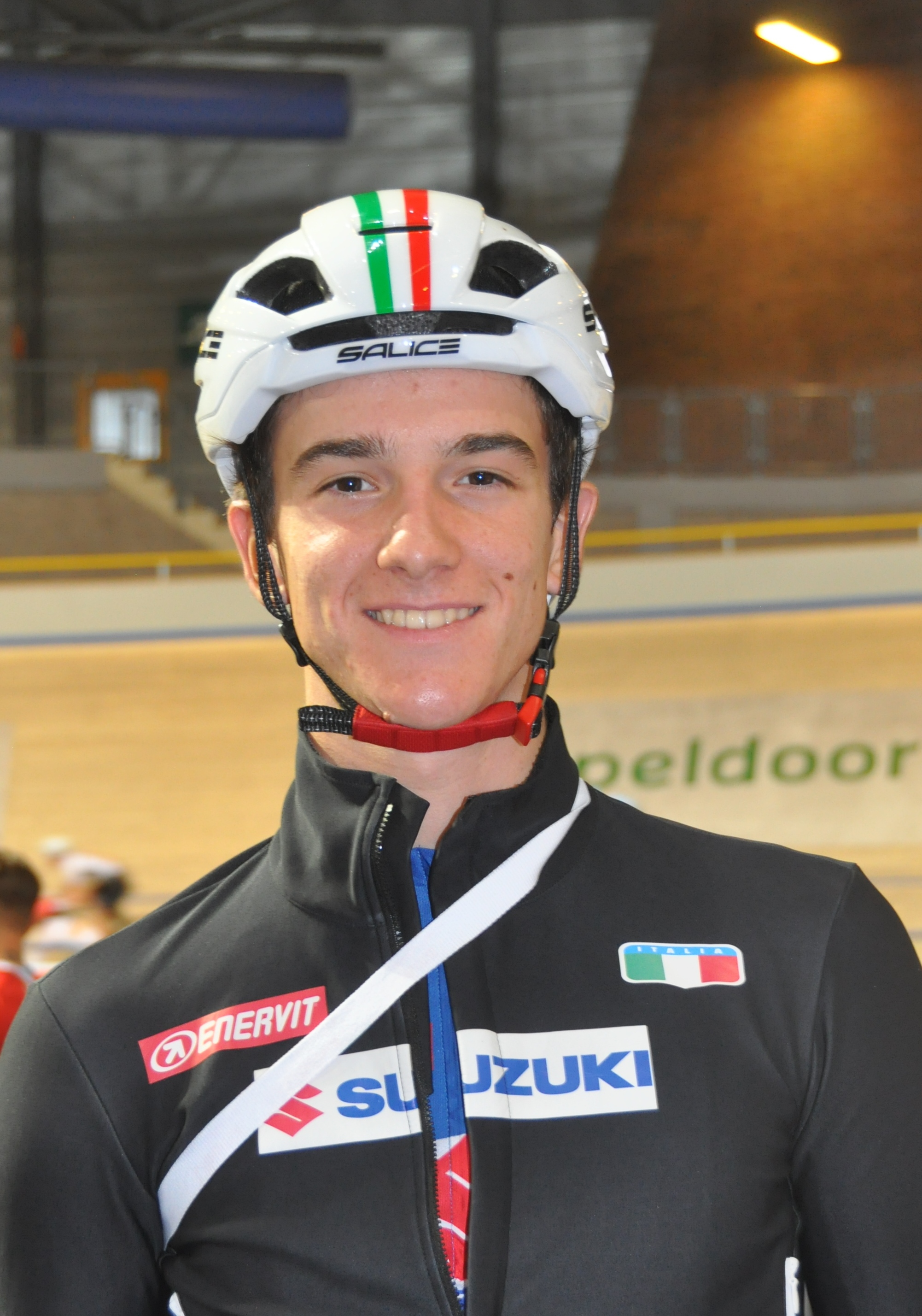
- Pinazzi in 2021

Personal information
- Born: 4 April 2001 (age 25) Colorno, Italy

Cycling career
- Sport: Cycling
- Current team: Bardiani–CSF 7 Saber
- Disciplines: Road; Track
- Role: Rider

Amateur team
- 2021–2023: Biesse–Arvedi

Professional teams
- 2020: Biesse–Arvedi
- 2024–: VF Group–Bardiani–CSF–Faizanè
Medal record
Men's track cycling
Representing Italy
European Track Championships
Gold medal – first place	Anadia 2022	U-23 Team Pursuit
Silver medal – second place	Anadia 2023	U-23 Team Pursuit
Bronze medal – third place	Apeldoorn 2021	U-23 Points Race

Mattia Pinazzi (born 4 April 2001) is an Italian road and track cyclist, who currently rides for UCI ProTeam Bardiani–CSF 7 Saber.

== Major results ==
=== Track ===
2021
3rd Points race, UEC European Under-23 Championships
2022

1st Madison, National Championships
1st Team pursuit, UEC European Under-23 Championships
2nd Team pursuit, UCI Nations Cup, Milton
3rd Scratch, UCI Nations Cup, Milton

2023
2nd Team pursuit, UEC European Under-23 Championships

=== Road ===
2022
2nd Circuito del Porto-Trofeo Arvedi
2023
1st Circuito del Porto-Trofeo Arvedi
2024
1st Stage 1 Istrian Spring Trophy
