= Miguel Ángel Fernández (cyclist) =

Spanish road racing cyclist

Personal information
- Full name: Miguel Ángel Fernández Ruiz
- Born: 21 March 1997 (age 29) Santander, Spain
- Height: 1.85 m (6 ft 1 in)
- Weight: 79 kg (174 lb)

Cycling career
- Sport: Cycling
- Current team: Equipo Kern Pharma
- Discipline: Road
- Role: Rider (retired)
- Rider type: Sprinter

Amateur teams
- 2016–2017: Aldro Cycling Team
- 2018–2019: Baqué–Ideus–BH Team
- 2021: Vigo-Rias Baixas

Professional teams
- 2020: Gios–Kiwi Atlántico
- 2022: Global 6 Cycling
- 2022: Burgos BH (stagiaire)
- 2023: Burgos BH
- 2024–2025: Equipo Kern Pharma

Miguel Ángel Fernández Ruiz (born 21 March 1997) is a Spanish retired cyclist, who last rode for UCI ProTeam Equipo Kern Pharma.

== Major results ==
2017
7th Vuelta Ciclista a La Rioja
2021
1st Trofeo Ayuntamiento de Zamora
1st Stage 1 Vuelta a Extremadura
1st Stage 2 Vuelta a Zamora
2nd Gran Premio de Primavera Ontur
9th Memorial Ángel Lozano
9th Circuito del Guadiana
2023
1st Stage 5 La Tropicale Amissa Bongo
