= José Manuel Díaz (cyclist) =

Spanish bicycle racer

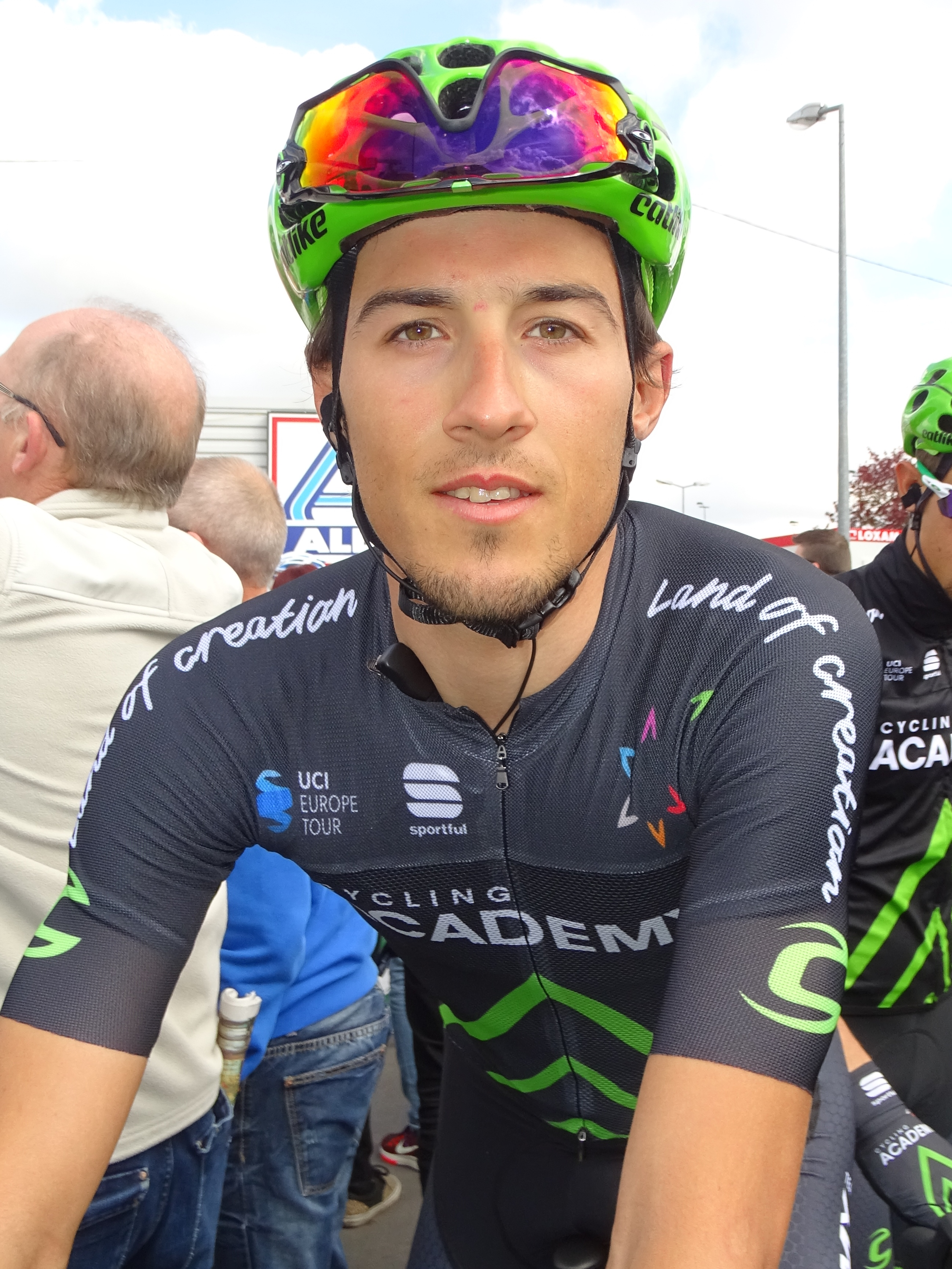
- Díaz in 2017.

Personal information
- Full name: José Manuel Díaz Gallego
- Born: 18 January 1995 (age 31) Jaén, Spain
- Height: 1.77 m (5 ft 10 in)
- Weight: 63 kg (139 lb)

Cycling career
- Sport: Cycling
- Current team: Burgos BH
- Discipline: Road
- Role: Rider
- Rider type: Climber

Amateur team
- 2014–2016: Bicicletas Rodríguez–Extremadura

Professional teams
- 2017–2018: Israel Cycling Academy
- 2019: Team Vorarlberg Santic
- 2020–2021: Nippo–Delko–One Provence
- 2022: Gazprom–RusVelo
- 2022–: Burgos BH

Major wins
- Stage races Tour of Turkey (2021)

José Manuel Díaz Gallego (born 18 January 1995 in Jaén) is a Spanish cyclist, who currently rides for UCI ProTeam Burgos BH.

After Gazprom–RusVelo lost its UCI license and its riders lost their contracts on 1 March 2022, Díaz was left without a job. On 3 June 2022 Burgos BH announced they had signed him on a 2-year contract.

== Major results ==
2017
10th Gran Premio di Lugano
10th Pro Ötztaler 5500
2019
1st Mountains classification, Czech Cycling Tour
2020 (1 pro win)
1st Stage 8 Tour du Rwanda
2021 (2)
1st Overall Tour of Turkey

1st Stage 5

9th Overall Tour du Limousin
10th Overall Tour de l'Ain
2022
6th Overall Troféu Joaquim Agostinho
Combativity award Stage 9 Vuelta a España
2023
3rd Overall Troféu Joaquim Agostinho

1st Stage 2

10th Tour du Jura
Combativity award Stage 11 Vuelta a España
2024
1st National Gravel Championships
3rd Tour du Doubs
4th Overall Vuelta a Asturias
6th Overall Tour de Langkawi
6th Clásica Terres de l'Ebre
7th Overall Tour of Hainan
8th Mercan'Tour Classic
10th Tour du Jura
2025
2nd Classic Grand Besançon Doubs
3rd Tour du Jura
8th Overall Tour de Langkawi
9th Overall Vuelta a Asturias
2026 (1)
1st Clásica Terres de l'Ebre
4th Overall Tour de Langkawi
7th Overall Vuelta a Asturias
8th Overall Tour of Hellas
10th Clásica de Ordizia

=== Grand Tour general classification results timeline ===
Grand Tour	2022	2023	2024	2025	2026
Giro d'Italia	—	—	—	—	—
Tour de France	—	—	—	—	—
Vuelta a España	43	64	—	—	

Legend
—	Did not compete
DNF	Did not finish
