= Xabier Isasa =

Spanish cyclist (born 2001)

Personal information
- Full name: Xabier Isasa Larrañaga
- Born: 24 August 2001 (age 25) Urretxu, Spain
- Height: 1.85 m (6 ft 1 in)

Cycling career
- Sport: Cycling
- Current team: Euskaltel–Euskadi
- Discipline: Road
- Role: Rider

Amateur teams
- 2020: Grupo Eulen
- 2021: Laboral Kutxa

Professional team
- 2022–: Euskaltel–Euskadi

Xabier Isasa Larrañaga (born 24 August 2001) is a Spanish professional racing cyclist, who currently rides for UCI ProTeam Euskaltel–Euskadi.

== Major results ==
2019
1st Overall Vuelta a Pamplona
10th Gipuzkoa Klasika
2021
1st Xanisteban Saria
1st San Roman Saria
2nd Overall Vuelta a Madrid Under-23
2024
Combativity award Stages 3, 7 & 17 Vuelta a España
2025
9th Overall Tour de Taiwan
2026 (1 pro win)
1st Stage 6 Volta a Portugal
4th Overall Dookoła Mazowsza

=== Grand Tour general classification results timeline ===
Grand Tour	2024
Giro d'Italia	—
Tour de France	—
Vuelta a España	104

Legend
—	Did not compete
DNF	Did not finish
