= Ibon Ruiz =

Spanish cyclist

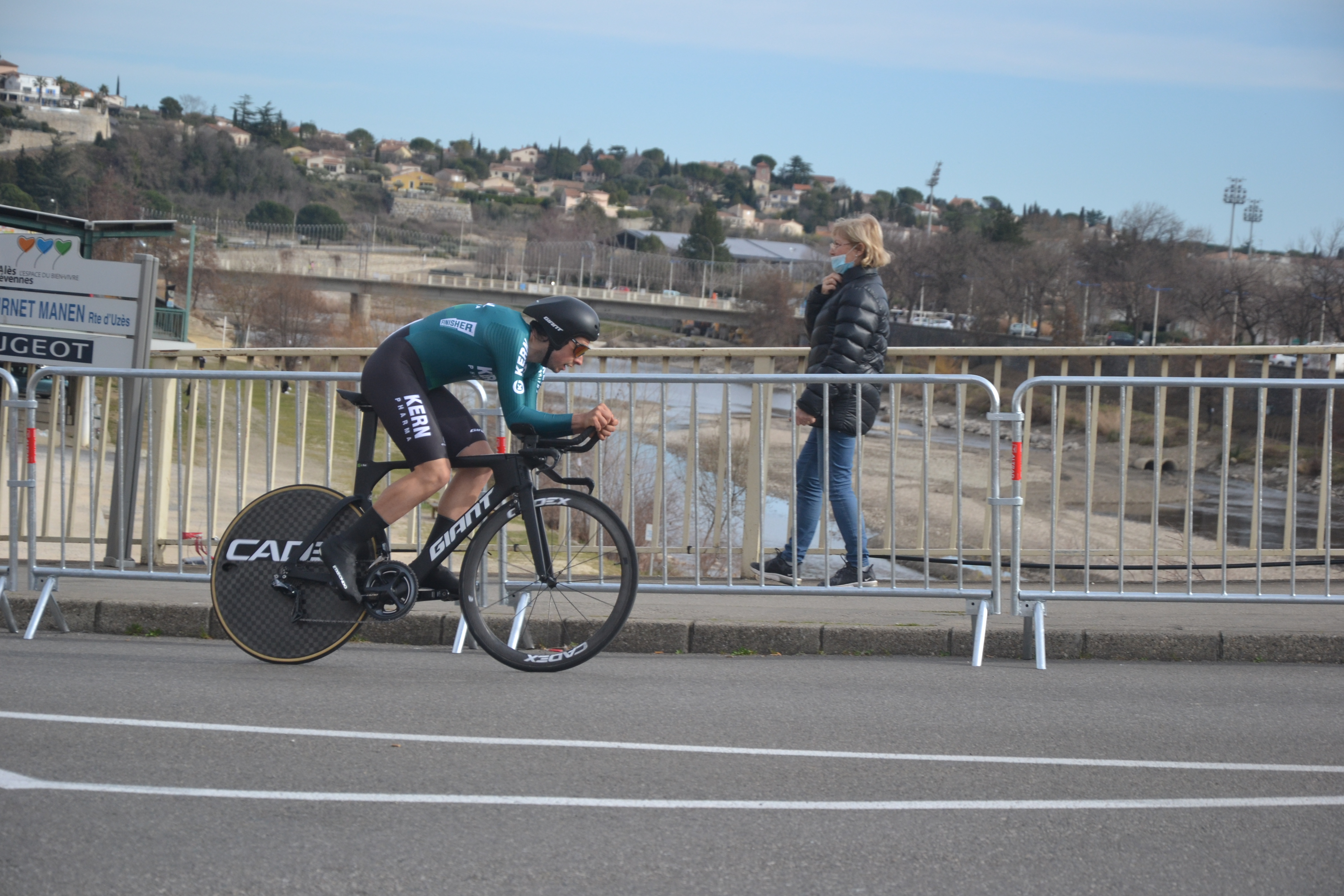
- Ruiz in 2022

Personal information
- Full name: Ibon Ruiz Sedano
- Born: 30 January 1999 (age 27) Vitoria-Gasteiz, Spain
- Height: 1.78 m (5 ft 10 in)
- Weight: 63 kg (139 lb)

Cycling career
- Sport: Cycling
- Current team: Equipo Kern Pharma
- Discipline: Road
- Role: Rider
- Rider type: Climber

Amateur team
- 2017–2019: Lizarte

Professional team
- 2020–: Equipo Kern Pharma

Ibon Ruiz Sedano (born 30 January 1999) is a Spanish cyclist, who currently rides for UCI ProTeam Equipo Kern Pharma.

== Major results ==
2018
1st Laudio Saria
1st Stage 3 Vuelta a Zamora
2021
1st Mountains classification, Volta a la Comunitat Valenciana
2024
1st Mountains classification, Vuelta a Asturias
7th Overall Tour de Langkawi
Combativity award Stage 5 Vuelta a España
2025
3rd Clásica Jaén Paraíso Interior
9th Overall Route d'Occitanie
10th Overall Tour of Turkey
2026
5th Overall Giro di Sardegna
5th Tour du Jura
9th Overall Tour of Turkiye

=== Grand Tour general classification results timeline ===
Grand Tour	2024
Giro d'Italia	—
Tour de France	—
Vuelta a España	101

Legend
—	Did not compete
DNF	Did not finish
