= 2025 Equipo Kern Pharma season =

Equipo Kern Pharma
- 2025 season
- UCI code: EKP
- Status: UCI ProTeam
- Manager: Juan José Oroz (ESP)
- Based: Spain
- Bicycles: Giant
- Groupset: Shimano

Season victories
- One-day races: 1
- Stage race stages: 2
- Most wins: (Spain) Urko Berrade (Spain) Diego Uriarte (1 win each)

The 2025 season for the Equipo Kern Pharma team is the team's 6th season in existence, and its 5th season as a UCI ProTeam.

== Team roster ==
As of 29 January 2025.

Rider	Date of birth
Ibai Azanza (ESP)	22 February 2004 (aged 20)
Hugo Aznar (ESP)	1 December 2003 (aged 21)
Unai Aznar (ESP)	26 July 2002 (aged 22)
Urko Berrade (ESP)	28 November 1997 (aged 27)
Marc Brustenga (ESP)	4 September 1999 (aged 25)
Pablo Carrascosa (ESP)	7 October 2002 (aged 22)
Iván Cobo (ESP)	2 January 2000 (aged 24)
Iñigo Elosegui (ESP)	6 March 1998 (aged 26)
Haimar Etxeberria (ESP)	8 September 2003 (aged 21)
Miguel Ángel Fernández (ESP)	21 March 1997 (aged 27)
Kiko Galván (ESP)	1 December 1997 (aged 27)

Rider	Date of birth
Nil Gimeno (ESP)	21 April 2004 (aged 20)
Jorge Gutiérrez (ESP)	23 September 2002 (aged 22)
Unai Iribar (ESP)	12 June 1999 (aged 25)
Pau Miquel (ESP)	20 August 2000 (aged 24)
José Félix Parra (ESP)	16 January 1997 (aged 27)
Mikel Retegi (ESP)	27 April 2001 (aged 23)
Ibon Ruiz (ESP)	30 January 1999 (aged 25)
Iván Sosa (COL)	31 October 1997 (aged 27)
Antonio Jesús Soto (ESP)	24 December 1994 (aged 30)
Diego Uriarte (ESP)	26 October 2001 (aged 23)
Mats Wenzel (LUX)	19 December 2002 (aged 22)

== Season victories ==
Date	Race	Competition	Rider	Country	Location	Ref.
24 January	Clàssica Camp de Morvedre	UCI Europe Tour	Urko Berrade (ESP)	Spain	Estivella	
22 February	Vuelta a Andalucía, stage 4	UCI ProSeries	Diego Uriarte (ESP)	Spain	Alhaurín de la Torre	
