= 2021 CRO Race =

2021 UCI Europe Tour
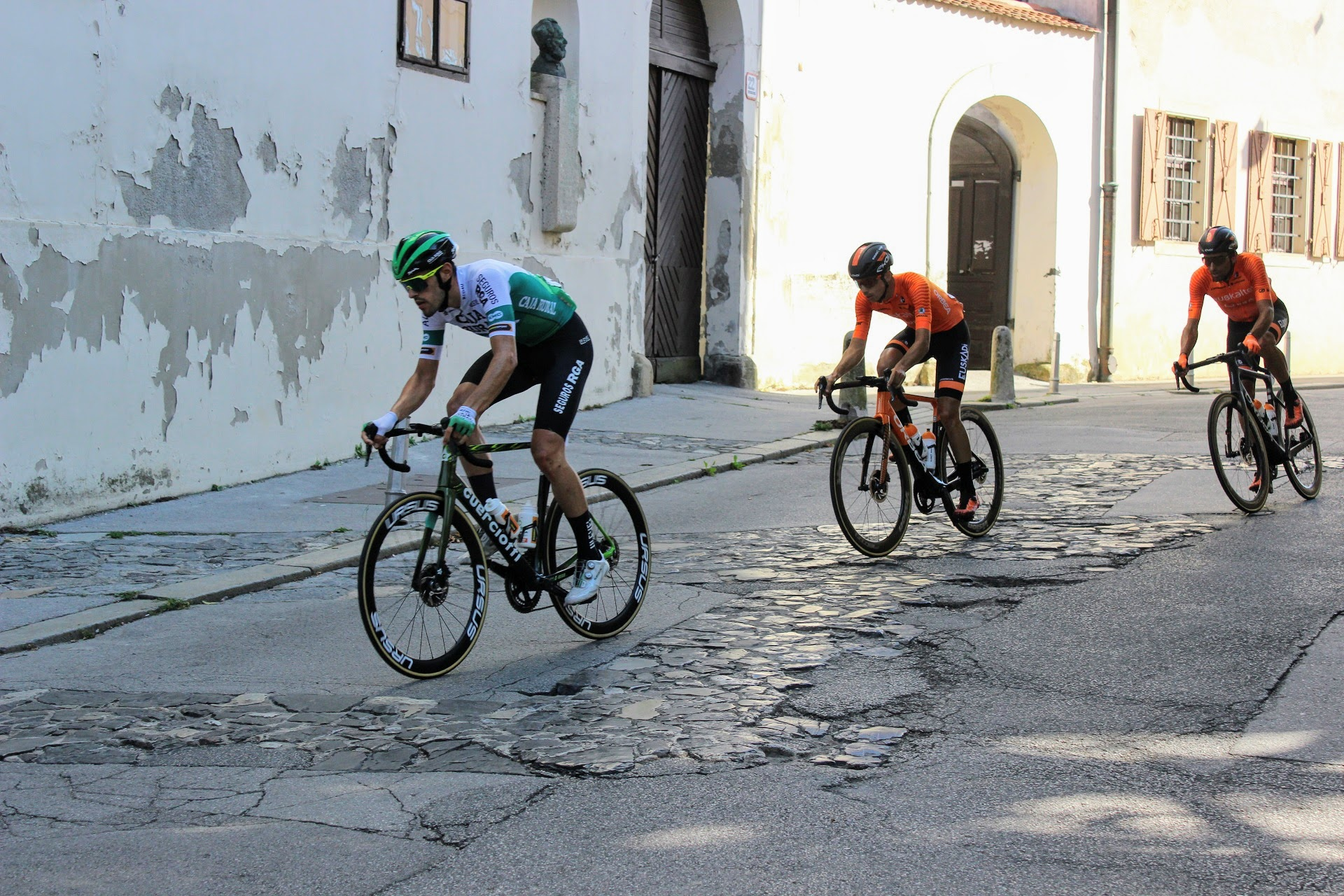
- Cyclists passing through the Upper Town of Zagreb on Stage 6

Race details
- Dates: 28 September–3 October 2021
- Stages: 6
- Distance: 1,083 km (673 mi)
- Winning time: 25h 45' 17"

Results
Jersey awarded to the overall winner	Winner	Stephen Williams (GBR)	(Team Bahrain Victorious)
	Second	Markus Hoelgaard (NOR)	(Uno-X Pro Cycling Team)
	Third	Mick van Dijke (NED)	(Team Jumbo–Visma)
Jersey awarded to the points classification winner	Points	Olav Kooij (NED)	(Team Jumbo–Visma)
Jersey awarded to the mountains classification winner	Mountains	Simon Yates (GBR)	(Team BikeExchange)
Jersey awarded to the young rider classification winner	Young rider	Mick van Dijke (NED)	(Team Jumbo–Visma)
	Team	Team Bahrain Victorious	

The 2021 CRO Race was a road cycling stage race that took place in Croatia between 28 September and 3 October 2021. It was the sixth edition of the Tour of Croatia since its revival in 2015 and the second under the CRO Race name. The race was rated as a category 2.1 event on the 2021 UCI Europe Tour calendar.

== Teams ==
Four of the 19 UCI WorldTeams, seven UCI ProTeams, and nine UCI Continental teams made up the 20 teams that participated in the race. All but four teams entered a full squad of seven riders; Caja Rural–Seguros RGA, Euskaltel–Euskadi, and Team Felbermayr–Simplon Wels each entered six riders, while Meridiana–Kamen entered five riders. In total, 134 riders started the race, of which 110 finished.

UCI WorldTeams

- Israel Start-Up Nation
- Team Bahrain Victorious
- Team BikeExchange
- Team Jumbo–Visma

UCI ProTeams

- Androni Giocattoli–Sidermec
- Bingoal Pauwels Sauces WB
- Caja Rural–Seguros RGA
- Equipo Kern Pharma
- Euskaltel–Euskadi
- Team Novo Nordisk
- Uno-X Pro Cycling Team

UCI Continental Teams

- Adria Mobil
- Cycling Team Friuli ASD
- HRE Mazowsze Serce Polski
- Meridiana–Kamen
- P&S Metalltechnik
- Team Felbermayr–Simplon Wels
- Team Vorarlberg
- Voster ATS Team
- WSA KTM Graz

== Route ==
Stage characteristics and winners
Stage	Date	Course	Distance	Type	Winner
1	28 September	Osijek to Varaždin	237 km (147 mi)	Flat stage	Phil Bauhaus (GER)
2	29 September	Slunj to Otočac	187 km (116 mi)	Hilly stage	Olav Kooij (NED)
3	30 September	Primošten to Makarska	167 km (104 mi)	Hilly stage	Milan Menten (BEL)
4	1 October	Zadar to Crikvenica	197 km (122 mi)	Hilly stage	Olav Kooij (NED)
5	2 October	Rabac/Labin to Opatija	137.5 km (85.4 mi)	Mountain stage	Stephen Williams (GBR)
6	3 October	Samobor to Zagreb	157.5 km (97.9 mi)	Flat stage	Tim van Dijke (NED)
Total			1,083 km (673 mi)		

== Stages ==
=== Stage 1 ===
28 September 2021 – Osijek to Varaždin, 237 km (147 mi)

Stage 1 Result (1–10)
Rank	Rider	Team	Time
1	Phil Bauhaus (GER)	Team Bahrain Victorious	5h 52' 06"
2	Olav Kooij (NED)	Team Jumbo–Visma	+ 0"
3	Kristoffer Halvorsen (NOR)	Uno-X Pro Cycling Team	+ 0"
4	Antonio Angulo (ESP)	Euskaltel–Euskadi	+ 0"
5	Mick van Dijke (NED)	Team Jumbo–Visma	+ 0"
6	Itamar Einhorn (ISR)	Israel Start-Up Nation	+ 0"
7	Michel Aschenbrenner (GER)	P&S Metalltechnik	+ 0"
8	Gotzon Martín (ESP)	Euskaltel–Euskadi	+ 0"
9	Milan Menten (BEL)	Bingoal Pauwels Sauces WB	+ 0"
10	David Per (SLO)	Adria Mobil	+ 0"

General classification after Stage 1 (1–10)
Rank	Rider	Team	Time
1	Phil Bauhaus (GER)	Team Bahrain Victorious	5h 51' 56"
2	Olav Kooij (NED)	Team Jumbo–Visma	+ 4"
3	Kristoffer Halvorsen (NOR)	Uno-X Pro Cycling Team	+ 5"
4	Markus Hoelgaard (NOR)	Uno-X Pro Cycling Team	+ 7"
5	Fran Miholjević (CRO)	Cycling Team Friuli ASD	+ 7"
6	Marceli Bogusławski (POL)	HRE Mazowsze Serce Polski	+ 7"
7	Paweł Franczak (POL)	Voster ATS Team	+ 7"
8	Anders Skaarseth (NOR)	Uno-X Pro Cycling Team	+ 8"
9	Stephen Williams (GBR)	Team Bahrain Victorious	+ 9"
10	Antonio Angulo (ESP)	Euskaltel–Euskadi	+ 10"

=== Stage 2 ===
29 September 2021 – Slunj to Otočac, 187 km (116 mi)

Stage 2 Result (1–10)
Rank	Rider	Team	Time
1	Olav Kooij (NED)	Team Jumbo–Visma	4h 22' 07"
2	Itamar Einhorn (ISR)	Israel Start-Up Nation	+ 0"
3	Kaden Groves (AUS)	Team BikeExchange	+ 0"
4	Jon Aberasturi (ESP)	Caja Rural–Seguros RGA	+ 0"
5	Daniel Auer (AUT)	WSA KTM Graz	+ 0"
6	Leonardo Marchiori (ITA)	Androni Giocattoli–Sidermec	+ 0"
7	Milan Menten (BEL)	Bingoal Pauwels Sauces WB	+ 0"
8	Antonio Angulo (ESP)	Euskaltel–Euskadi	+ 0"
9	Gotzon Martín (ESP)	Euskaltel–Euskadi	+ 0"
10	Kristoffer Halvorsen (NOR)	Uno-X Pro Cycling Team	+ 0"

General classification after Stage 2 (1–10)
Rank	Rider	Team	Time
1	Olav Kooij (NED)	Team Jumbo–Visma	10h 13' 57"
2	Phil Bauhaus (GER)	Team Bahrain Victorious	+ 6"
3	Itamar Einhorn (ISR)	Israel Start-Up Nation	+ 10"
4	Kristoffer Halvorsen (NOR)	Uno-X Pro Cycling Team	+ 11"
5	Mateusz Grabis (POL)	Voster ATS Team	+ 11"
6	Markus Hoelgaard (NOR)	Uno-X Pro Cycling Team	+ 13"
7	Jaime Castrillo (ESP)	Equipo Kern Pharma	+ 13"
8	Fran Miholjević (CRO)	Cycling Team Friuli ASD	+ 13"
9	Marceli Bogusławski (POL)	HRE Mazowsze Serce Polski	+ 13"
10	Anders Skaarseth (NOR)	Uno-X Pro Cycling Team	+ 14"

=== Stage 3 ===
30 September 2021 – Primošten to Makarska, 167 km (104 mi)

Stage 3 Result (1–10)
Rank	Rider	Team	Time
1	Milan Menten (BEL)	Bingoal Pauwels Sauces WB	3h 58' 33"
2	Mick van Dijke (NED)	Team Jumbo–Visma	+ 0"
3	Anders Skaarseth (NOR)	Uno-X Pro Cycling Team	+ 0"
4	Josip Rumac (CRO)	Androni Giocattoli–Sidermec	+ 0"
5	Stephen Williams (GBR)	Team Bahrain Victorious	+ 0"
6	Markus Hoelgaard (NOR)	Uno-X Pro Cycling Team	+ 0"
7	Andi Bajc (SLO)	Team Felbermayr–Simplon Wels	+ 0"
8	Colin Stüssi (SUI)	Team Vorarlberg	+ 0"
9	Antonio Angulo (ESP)	Euskaltel–Euskadi	+ 0"
10	Roland Thalmann (SUI)	Team Vorarlberg	+ 0"

General classification after Stage 3 (1–10)
Rank	Rider	Team	Time
1	Milan Menten (BEL)	Bingoal Pauwels Sauces WB	14h 12' 34"
2	Anders Skaarseth (NOR)	Uno-X Pro Cycling Team	+ 3"
3	Mick van Dijke (NED)	Team Jumbo–Visma	+ 6"
4	Markus Hoelgaard (NOR)	Uno-X Pro Cycling Team	+ 9"
5	Urko Berrade (ESP)	Equipo Kern Pharma	+ 10"
6	Dominik Röber (GER)	P&S Metalltechnik	+ 10"
7	Stephen Williams (GBR)	Team Bahrain Victorious	+ 11"
8	Antonio Angulo (ESP)	Euskaltel–Euskadi	+ 12"
9	Gotzon Martín (ESP)	Euskaltel–Euskadi	+ 12"
10	Jakub Kaczmarek (POL)	HRE Mazowsze Serce Polski	+ 12"

=== Stage 4 ===
1 October 2021 – Zadar to Crikvenica, 197 km (122 mi)

Stage 4 Result (1–10)
Rank	Rider	Team	Time
1	Olav Kooij (NED)	Team Jumbo–Visma	4h 49' 16"
2	Kaden Groves (AUS)	Team BikeExchange	+ 0"
3	Josip Rumac (CRO)	Androni Giocattoli–Sidermec	+ 0"
4	Maciej Paterski (POL)	Voster ATS Team	+ 0"
5	Itamar Einhorn (ISR)	Israel Start-Up Nation	+ 0"
6	Antonio Angulo (ESP)	Euskaltel–Euskadi	+ 0"
7	Piotr Brożyna (POL)	HRE Mazowsze Serce Polski	+ 0"
8	Riccardo Carretta (ITA)	Cycling Team Friuli ASD	+ 0"
9	Stephen Williams (GBR)	Team Bahrain Victorious	+ 0"
10	Gotzon Martín (ESP)	Euskaltel–Euskadi	+ 0"

General classification after Stage 4 (1–10)
Rank	Rider	Team	Time
1	Anders Skaarseth (NOR)	Uno-X Pro Cycling Team	19h 01' 50"
2	Milan Menten (BEL)	Bingoal Pauwels Sauces WB	+ 0"
3	Mick van Dijke (NED)	Team Jumbo–Visma	+ 6"
4	Josip Rumac (CRO)	Androni Giocattoli–Sidermec	+ 8"
5	Markus Hoelgaard (NOR)	Uno-X Pro Cycling Team	+ 9"
6	Urko Berrade (ESP)	Equipo Kern Pharma	+ 10"
7	Torstein Traeen (NOR)	Uno-X Pro Cycling Team	+ 10"
8	Dominik Röber (GER)	P&S Metalltechnik	+ 10"
9	Stephen Williams (GBR)	Team Bahrain Victorious	+ 11"
10	Antonio Angulo (ESP)	Euskaltel–Euskadi	+ 12"

=== Stage 5 ===
2 October 2021 – Rabac/Labin to Opatija, 137.5 km (85.4 mi)

Stage 5 Result (1–10)
Rank	Rider	Team	Time
1	Stephen Williams (GBR)	Team Bahrain Victorious	3h 20' 35"
2	Markus Hoelgaard (NOR)	Uno-X Pro Cycling Team	+ 10"
3	Mick van Dijke (NED)	Team Jumbo–Visma	+ 10"
4	Gotzon Martín (ESP)	Euskaltel–Euskadi	+ 10"
5	Alexis Guérin (FRA)	Team Vorarlberg	+ 10"
6	Joel Nicolau (ESP)	Caja Rural–Seguros RGA	+ 10"
7	Urko Berrade (ESP)	Equipo Kern Pharma	+ 10"
8	Roland Thalmann (SUI)	Team Vorarlberg	+ 10"
9	José Félix Parra (ESP)	Equipo Kern Pharma	+ 10"
10	Santiago Buitrago (COL)	Team Bahrain Victorious	+ 10"

General classification after Stage 5 (1–10)
Rank	Rider	Team	Time
1	Stephen Williams (GBR)	Team Bahrain Victorious	22h 22' 20"
2	Mick van Dijke (NED)	Team Jumbo–Visma	+ 17"
3	Markus Hoelgaard (NOR)	Uno-X Pro Cycling Team	+ 18"
4	Simon Yates (GBR)	Team BikeExchange	+ 23"
5	Urko Berrade (ESP)	Equipo Kern Pharma	+ 24"
6	Hermann Pernsteiner (AUT)	Team Bahrain Victorious	+ 24"
7	Gotzon Martín (ESP)	Euskaltel–Euskadi	+ 27"
8	Roland Thalmann (SUI)	Team Vorarlberg	+ 27"
9	Joel Nicolau (ESP)	Caja Rural–Seguros RGA	+ 27"
10	José Félix Parra (ESP)	Equipo Kern Pharma	+ 27"

=== Stage 6 ===
3 October 2021 – Samobor to Zagreb, 157.5 km (97.9 mi)

Stage 6 Result (1–10)
Rank	Rider	Team	Time
1	Tim van Dijke (NED)	Team Jumbo–Visma	3h 23' 03"
2	Stephen Williams (GBR)	Team Bahrain Victorious	+ 0"
3	Markus Hoelgaard (NOR)	Uno-X Pro Cycling Team	+ 0"
4	Kaden Groves (AUS)	Team BikeExchange	+ 5"
5	Jon Aberasturi (ESP)	Caja Rural–Seguros RGA	+ 5"
6	Milan Menten (BEL)	Bingoal Pauwels Sauces WB	+ 5"
7	Olav Kooij (NED)	Team Jumbo–Visma	+ 5"
8	Andrea Peron (ITA)	Team Novo Nordisk	+ 5"
9	Gotzon Martín (ESP)	Euskaltel–Euskadi	+ 5"
10	Jakub Kaczmarek (POL)	HRE Mazowsze Serce Polski	+ 5"

General classification after Stage 6 (1–10)
Rank	Rider	Team	Time
1	Stephen Williams (GBR)	Team Bahrain Victorious	25h 45' 17"
2	Markus Hoelgaard (NOR)	Uno-X Pro Cycling Team	+ 17"
3	Mick van Dijke (NED)	Team Jumbo–Visma	+ 28"
4	Simon Yates (GBR)	Team BikeExchange	+ 34"
5	Urko Berrade (ESP)	Equipo Kern Pharma	+ 35"
6	Gotzon Martín (ESP)	Euskaltel–Euskadi	+ 36"
7	Roland Thalmann (SUI)	Team Vorarlberg	+ 38"
8	Joel Nicolau (ESP)	Caja Rural–Seguros RGA	+ 38"
9	José Félix Parra (ESP)	Equipo Kern Pharma	+ 38"
10	Alexis Guérin (FRA)	Team Vorarlberg	+ 38"

== Classification leadership table ==
In the 2021 CRO Race, four different jerseys were awarded. The general classification was calculated by adding each cyclist's finishing times on each stage, and applying time bonuses for the first three riders at intermediate sprints (three seconds to first, two seconds to second, and one second to third) and at the finish of mass-start stages; these were awarded to the first three finishers on all stages: the stage winner won a ten-second bonus, with six and four seconds for the second and third riders, respectively. The leader of the classification received a red jersey; it was considered the most important of the 2021 CRO Race, and the winner of the classification was considered the winner of the race.

Points for the mountains classification
Position	1	2	3	4	5	6	7	8
Points for Hors-category	20	15	10	8	6	4	3	2
Points for Category 1	12	8	6	4	2	0		
Points for Category 2	6	4	2	0				
Points for Category 3	3	2	1	0				

Additionally, there was a points classification, for which the leader was awarded a blue jersey. In the points classification, cyclists received points for finishing in the top 15 of each stage. For winning a stage, a rider earned 25 points, with 20 for second, 16 for third, 14 for fourth, 12 for fifth, 10 for sixth, and a point fewer per place down to 1 point for 15th place. Points towards the classification could also be won on a 5–3–1 scale for the first three riders, respectively, at intermediate sprint points during each stage; these intermediate sprints also offered bonus seconds towards the general classification as noted above.

There was also a mountains classification, the leadership of which was marked by a green jersey. In the mountains classification, points towards the classification were won by reaching the summit of a climb before other cyclists. Each climb was marked as either hors, first, second, or third-category, with more points available for the higher-categorized climbs.

The fourth and final jersey represented the young rider classification, and its leadership was marked by a white jersey. This was decided in the same way as the general classification, but only riders born after 1 January 1999 (i.e., under 23 years of age at the beginning of the year) were eligible to be ranked in the classification. There was also a team classification, in which the times of the best three cyclists per team on each stage were added together; the leading team at the end of the race was the team with the lowest total time.

Classification leadership by stage
Stage	Winner	General classification	Points classification	Mountains classification	Young rider classification	Team classification
1	Phil Bauhaus	Phil Bauhaus	Phil Bauhaus	Marceli Bogusławski	Olav Kooij	Team Jumbo–Visma
2	Olav Kooij	Olav Kooij	Olav Kooij	Marcin Budziński	Olav Kooij	Team Jumbo–Visma
3	Milan Menten	Milan Menten	Olav Kooij	Torstein Træen	Mick van Dijke	Team Jumbo–Visma
4	Olav Kooij	Anders Skaarseth	Olav Kooij	Torstein Træen	Mick van Dijke	Team Jumbo–Visma
5	Stephen Williams	Stephen Williams	Olav Kooij	Simon Yates	Mick van Dijke	Team Bahrain Victorious
6	Tim van Dijke	Stephen Williams	Olav Kooij	Simon Yates	Mick van Dijke	Team Bahrain Victorious
Final		Stephen Williams	Olav Kooij	Simon Yates	Mick van Dijke	Team Bahrain Victorious

- On stage 2, Kristoffer Halvorsen, who was third in the points classification, wore the blue jersey, because first-placed Phil Bauhaus wore the red jersey as the leader of the general classification and second-placed Olav Kooij wore the white jersey as the leader of the young rider classification.
- On stage 3, Itamar Einhorn, who was second in the points classification, wore the blue jersey, because first-placed Olav Kooij wore the red jersey as the leader of the general classification. For the same reason, Fran Miholjević, who was second in the young rider classification, wore the white jersey.

== Final classification standings ==
Legend
Denotes the winner of the general classification	Denotes the winner of the mountains classification
Denotes the winner of the points classification	Denotes the winner of the young rider classification

=== General classification ===
Final general classification (1–10)
Rank	Rider	Team	Time
1	Stephen Williams (GBR)	Team Bahrain Victorious	25h 45' 17"
2	Markus Hoelgaard (NOR)	Uno-X Pro Cycling Team	+ 17"
3	Mick van Dijke (NED)	Team Jumbo–Visma	+ 28"
4	Simon Yates (GBR)	Team BikeExchange	+ 34"
5	Urko Berrade (ESP)	Equipo Kern Pharma	+ 35"
6	Gotzon Martín (ESP)	Euskaltel–Euskadi	+ 36"
7	Roland Thalmann (SUI)	Team Vorarlberg	+ 38"
8	Joel Nicolau (ESP)	Caja Rural–Seguros RGA	+ 38"
9	José Félix Parra (ESP)	Equipo Kern Pharma	+ 38"
10	Alexis Guérin (FRA)	Team Vorarlberg	+ 38"

=== Points classification ===
Final points classification (1–10)
Rank	Rider	Team	Points
1	Olav Kooij (NED)	Team Jumbo–Visma	79
2	Stephen Williams (GBR)	Team Bahrain Victorious	75
3	Markus Hoelgaard (NOR)	Uno-X Pro Cycling Team	56
4	Kaden Groves (AUS)	Team BikeExchange	55
5	Milan Menten (BEL)	Bingoal Pauwels Sauces WB	54
6	Mick van Dijke (NED)	Team Jumbo–Visma	48
7	Gotzon Martín (ESP)	Euskaltel–Euskadi	48
8	Itamar Einhorn (ISR)	Israel Start-Up Nation	42
9	Antonio Angulo (ESP)	Euskaltel–Euskadi	39
10	Anders Skaarseth (NOR)	Uno-X Pro Cycling Team	33

=== Mountains classification ===
Final mountains classification (1–10)
Rank	Rider	Team	Points
1	Simon Yates (GBR)	Team BikeExchange	30
2	Stephen Williams (GBR)	Team Bahrain Victorious	25
3	Torstein Træen (NOR)	Uno-X Pro Cycling Team	23
4	Hermann Pernsteiner (AUT)	Team Bahrain Victorious	18
5	Oier Lazkano (ESP)	Caja Rural–Seguros RGA	17
6	José Félix Parra (ESP)	Equipo Kern Pharma	12
7	Marcin Budziński (POL)	HRE Mazowsze Serce Polski	10
8	Sam Oomen (NED)	Team Jumbo–Visma	8
9	Jon Barrenetxea (ESP)	Caja Rural–Seguros RGA	6
10	Lukas Meiler (GER)	Team Vorarlberg	6

=== Young rider classification ===
Final young rider classification (1–10)
Rank	Rider	Team	Time
1	Mick van Dijke (NED)	Team Jumbo–Visma	25h 45' 45"
2	Dominik Röber (GER)	P&S Metalltechnik	+ 4' 22"
3	Gal Glivar (SLO)	Adria Mobil	+ 4' 42"
4	Oier Lazkano (ESP)	Caja Rural–Seguros RGA	+ 5' 09"
5	Santiago Buitrago (COL)	Team Bahrain Victorious	+ 6' 23"
6	Fran Miholjević (CRO)	Cycling Team Friuli ASD	+ 7' 21"
7	Martin Messner (AUT)	WSA KTM Graz	+ 7' 44"
8	Edoardo Sandri (ITA)	Cycling Team Friuli ASD	+ 12' 49"
9	Savva Novikov (RUS)	Equipo Kern Pharma	+ 23' 38"
10	Kristjan Hočevar (SLO)	Adria Mobil	+ 24' 19"

=== Team classification ===
Final team classification (1–10)
Rank	Team	Time
1	Team Bahrain Victorious	77h 21' 01"
2	Team BikeExchange	+ 1' 15"
3	Team Jumbo–Visma	+ 1' 17"
4	Team Vorarlberg	+ 1' 23"
5	Equipo Kern Pharma	+ 1' 23"
6	Caja Rural–Seguros RGA	+ 1' 30"
7	Uno-X Pro Cycling Team	+ 3' 12"
8	Team Felbermayr–Simplon Wels	+ 7' 20"
9	HRE Mazowsze Serce Polski	+ 10' 12"
10	Euskaltel–Euskadi	+ 10' 25"
