= 2026 Presidential Cycling Tour of Turkiye =

Cycling race

2026 Presidential Tour of Turkey
2026 UCI ProSeries

Race details
- Dates: 26 April – 3 May 2026
- Stages: 8
- Distance: 1,131.2 km (702.9 mi)
- Winning time: 26h 34' 19"

Results
Jersey awarded to the overall winner	Winner	Sebastian Berwick (AUS)	(Caja Rural–Seguros RGA)
	Second	Iván Sosa (COL)	(Equipo Kern Pharma)
	Third	Kamiel Bonneu (BEL)	(Solution Tech NIPPO Rali)
Jersey awarded to the points classification winner	Points	Tom Crabbe (BEL)	(Team Flanders–Baloise)
Jersey awarded to the mountains classification winner	Mountains	Sebastian Berwick (AUS)	(Caja Rural–Seguros RGA)
Jersey awarded to the sprints classification winner	Sprints	Mustafa Tarakcı (TUR)	(Konya Büyükşehir Belediyespor)
	Team	(Kazakhstan) XDS Astana Team	

The 2026 Presidential Cycling Tour of Turkey was a road cycling stage race that took place between 26 April and 3 May 2026 in Turkey. It was the 61st edition of the Presidential Tour of Turkey.

== Teams ==
Three UCI WorldTeams, fourteen UCI ProTeams, and six UCI Continental teams made up the 23 teams that participated in the race.

UCI WorldTeams

- Alpecin–Premier Tech
- Team Picnic–PostNL
- XDS Astana Team

UCI ProTeams

- Bardiani–CSF 7 Saber
- Burgos Burpellet BH
- Caja Rural–Seguros RGA
- Cofidis
- Equipo Kern Pharma
- Euskaltel–Euskadi
- MBH Bank CSB Telecom Fort
- Modern Adventure Pro Cycling
- Solution Tech NIPPO Rali
- Team Flanders–Baloise
- Team Novo Nordisk
- Team Polti VisitMalta
- Team TotalEnergies
- Unibet Rose Rockets

UCI Continental Teams

- ATT Investments
- Istanbul Cycling Team
- Konya Büyükşehir Belediyespor
- Muğla Büyükşehir Belediyesi Spor Kulübü
- Spor Toto Cycling Team
- Tarteletto–Isorex

== Route ==
Stage characteristics and winners
Stage	Date	Course	Distance	Type	Stage winner
1	26 April	Çeşme to Selçuk	148.7 km (92.4 mi)	Flat stage	Tom Crabbe (BEL)
2	27 April	Aydın to Marmaris	152.8 km (94.9 mi)	Hilly stage	Tom Crabbe (BEL)
3	28 April	Marmaris to Kıran	132.7 km (82.5 mi)	Mountain stage	Iván Sosa (COL)
4	29 April	Marmaris to Fethiye	130.4 km (81.0 mi)	Flat stage	Stanisław Aniołkowski (POL)
5	30 April	Patara to Kemer	180.7 km (112.3 mi)	Hilly stage	Casper van Uden (NED)
6	1 May	Antalya to Feslikan	127.9 km (79.5 mi)	Mountain stage	Christian Bagatin (ITA)
7	2 May	Antalya to Antalya	152.8 km (94.9 mi)	Hilly stage	Davide Ballerini (ITA)
8	3 May	Ankara to Ankara	105.2 km (65.4 mi)	Flat stage	Tom Crabbe (BEL)
Total			1,131.2 km (702.9 mi)		

== Stages ==
=== Stage 1 ===
26 April 2026 — Çeşme to Selçuk, 148.7 km (92.4 mi)

Stage 1 Result
Rank	Rider	Team	Time
1	Tom Crabbe (BEL)	Team Flanders–Baloise	3h 23' 57"
2	Simon Dehairs (BEL)	Alpecin–Premier Tech	+ 0"
3	Davide Persico (ITA)	MBH Bank CSB Telecom Fort	+ 0"
4	Ramazan Yilmaz (TUR)	Konya Büyükşehir Belediyespor	+ 0"
5	Jason Tesson (FRA)	Team TotalEnergies	+ 0"
6	Fernando Gaviria (COL)	Caja Rural–Seguros RGA	+ 0"
7	Paul Hennequin (FRA)	Euskaltel–Euskadi	+ 0"
8	Filippo Cettolin (ITA)	Bardiani–CSF 7 Saber	+ 0"
9	Giovanni Lonardi (ITA)	Team Polti VisitMalta	+ 0"
10	Timothy Dupont (BEL)	Tarteletto–Isorex	+ 0"

General classification after Stage 1
Rank	Rider	Team	Time
1	Tom Crabbe (BEL)	Team Flanders–Baloise	3h 23' 47"
2	Simon Dehairs (BEL)	Alpecin–Premier Tech	+ 4"
3	Davide Persico (ITA)	MBH Bank CSB Telecom Fort	+ 6"
4	Michał Pomorski (POL)	ATT Investments	+ 7"
5	Ramazan Yilmaz (TUR)	Konya Büyükşehir Belediyespor	+ 10"
6	Jason Tesson (FRA)	Team TotalEnergies	+ 10"
7	Fernando Gaviria (COL)	Caja Rural–Seguros RGA	+ 10"
8	Paul Hennequin (FRA)	Euskaltel–Euskadi	+ 10"
9	Filippo Cettolin (ITA)	Bardiani–CSF 7 Saber	+ 10"
10	Giovanni Lonardi (ITA)	Team Polti VisitMalta	+ 10"

=== Stage 2 ===
27 April 2026 — Aydın to Marmaris, 152.8 km (94.9 mi)

Stage 2 Result
Rank	Rider	Team	Time
1	Tom Crabbe (BEL)	Team Flanders–Baloise	3h 35' 32"
2	Sente Sentjens (BEL)	Alpecin–Premier Tech	+ 0"
3	César Macías (MEX)	Burgos Burpellet BH	+ 0"
4	Davide Ballerini (ITA)	XDS Astana Team	+ 0"
5	Stanisław Aniołkowski (POL)	Cofidis	+ 0"
6	Dominik Neuman (CZE)	ATT Investments	+ 0"
7	Lorenzo Conforti (ITA)	Bardiani–CSF 7 Saber	+ 0"
8	Stefano Oldani (ITA)	Caja Rural–Seguros RGA	+ 0"
9	Jelle Vermoote (BEL)	Tarteletto–Isorex	+ 0"
10	Marc Brustenga (ESP)	Equipo Kern Pharma	+ 0"

General classification after Stage 2
Rank	Rider	Team	Time
1	Tom Crabbe (BEL)	Team Flanders–Baloise	6h 59' 09"
2	Sente Sentjens (BEL)	Alpecin–Premier Tech	+ 14"
3	Davide Persico (ITA)	MBH Bank CSB Telecom Fort	+ 16"
4	César Macías (MEX)	Burgos Burpellet BH	+ 16"
5	Fernando Gaviria (COL)	Caja Rural–Seguros RGA	+ 20"
6	Stanisław Aniołkowski (POL)	Cofidis	+ 20"
7	Stefano Oldani (ITA)	Caja Rural–Seguros RGA	+ 20"
8	Marc Brustenga (ESP)	Equipo Kern Pharma	+ 20"
9	Scott McGill (USA)	Modern Adventure Pro Cycling	+ 20"
10	Davide Ballerini (ITA)	XDS Astana Team	+ 20"

=== Stage 3 ===
28 April 2026 — Marmaris to Kıran, 132.7 km (82.5 mi)

Stage 3 Result
Rank	Rider	Team	Time
1	Iván Sosa (COL)	Equipo Kern Pharma	3h 40' 25"
2	Sebastian Berwick (AUS)	Caja Rural–Seguros RGA	+ 9"
3	Nicolas Breuillard (FRA)	Team TotalEnergies	+ 15"
4	Alessandro Fancellu (ITA)	MBH Bank CSB Telecom Fort	+ 26"
5	Kamiel Bonneu (BEL)	Solution Tech NIPPO Rali	+ 30"
6	Nicolas Vinokurov (KAZ)	XDS Astana Team	+ 40"
7	Matteo Scalco (ITA)	XDS Astana Team	+ 53"
8	Henok Mulubrhan (ERI)	XDS Astana Team	+ 53"
9	Jordan Jegat (FRA)	Team TotalEnergies	+ 55"
10	Mikel Bizkarra (ESP)	Euskaltel–Euskadi	+ 57"

General classification after Stage 3
Rank	Rider	Team	Time
1	Iván Sosa (COL)	Equipo Kern Pharma	10h 39' 44"
2	Sebastian Berwick (AUS)	Caja Rural–Seguros RGA	+ 13"
3	Nicolas Breuillard (FRA)	Team TotalEnergies	+ 21"
4	Alessandro Fancellu (ITA)	MBH Bank CSB Telecom Fort	+ 36"
5	Kamiel Bonneu (BEL)	Solution Tech NIPPO Rali	+ 40"
6	Nicolas Vinokurov (KAZ)	XDS Astana Team	+ 50"
7	Henok Mulubrhan (ERI)	XDS Astana Team	+ 1' 03"
8	Matteo Scalco (ITA)	XDS Astana Team	+ 1' 03"
9	Jordan Jegat (FRA)	Team TotalEnergies	+ 1' 05"
10	José Félix Parra (ESP)	Caja Rural–Seguros RGA	+ 1' 07"

=== Stage 4 ===
29 April 2026 — Marmaris to Fethiye, 130.4 km (81.0 mi)

Stage 4 Result
Rank	Rider	Team	Time
1	Stanisław Aniołkowski (POL)	Cofidis	2h 52' 50"
2	Riley Pickrell (CAN)	Modern Adventure Pro Cycling	+ 0"
3	Davide Persico (ITA)	MBH Bank CSB Telecom Fort	+ 0"
4	Manuel Peñalver (ESP)	Team Polti VisitMalta	+ 0"
5	Marc Brustenga (ESP)	Equipo Kern Pharma	+ 0"
6	Davide Ballerini (ITA)	XDS Astana Team	+ 0"
7	Sente Sentjens (BEL)	Alpecin–Premier Tech	+ 0"
8	Marco Manenti (ITA)	Bardiani–CSF 7 Saber	+ 0"
9	César Macías (MEX)	Burgos Burpellet BH	+ 0"
10	Sergio Romeo (ESP)	Equipo Kern Pharma	+ 0"

General classification after Stage 4
Rank	Rider	Team	Time
1	Iván Sosa (COL)	Equipo Kern Pharma	13h 32' 34"
2	Sebastian Berwick (AUS)	Caja Rural–Seguros RGA	+ 13"
3	Nicolas Breuillard (FRA)	Team TotalEnergies	+ 21"
4	Alessandro Fancellu (ITA)	MBH Bank CSB Telecom Fort	+ 36"
5	Kamiel Bonneu (BEL)	Solution Tech NIPPO Rali	+ 40"
6	Nicolas Vinokurov (KAZ)	XDS Astana Team	+ 50"
7	Henok Mulubrhan (ERI)	XDS Astana Team	+ 1' 03"
8	Matteo Scalco (ITA)	XDS Astana Team	+ 1' 03"
9	Jordan Jegat (FRA)	Team TotalEnergies	+ 1' 05"
10	José Félix Parra (ESP)	Caja Rural–Seguros RGA	+ 1' 07"

=== Stage 5 ===
30 April 2026 — Patara to Kemer, 180.7 km (112.3 mi)

Stage 5 Result
Rank	Rider	Team	Time
1	Casper van Uden (NED)	Team Picnic–PostNL	4h 06' 09"
2	Marcin Budziński (POL)	MBH Bank CSB Telecom Fort	+ 0"
3	Nikita Tsvetkov (UZB)	Bardiani–CSF 7 Saber	+ 0"
4	Dario Igor Belleta (ITA)	Team Polti VisitMalta	+ 0"
5	Davide Ballerini (ITA)	XDS Astana Team	+ 0"
6	Stefano Oldani (ITA)	Caja Rural–Seguros RGA	+ 0"
7	César Macías (MEX)	Burgos Burpellet BH	+ 0"
8	Lorenzo Conforti (ITA)	Bardiani–CSF 7 Saber	+ 0"
9	Jonas Rickaert (BEL)	Alpecin–Premier Tech	+ 0"
10	Henok Mulubrhan (ERI)	XDS Astana Team	+ 0"

General classification after Stage 5
Rank	Rider	Team	Time
1	Iván Sosa (COL)	Equipo Kern Pharma	17h 38' 43"
2	Sebastian Berwick (AUS)	Caja Rural–Seguros RGA	+ 13"
3	Nicolas Breuillard (FRA)	Team TotalEnergies	+ 21"
4	Alessandro Fancellu (ITA)	MBH Bank CSB Telecom Fort	+ 34"
5	Kamiel Bonneu (BEL)	Solution Tech NIPPO Rali	+ 40"
6	Nicolas Vinokurov (KAZ)	XDS Astana Team	+ 50"
7	Henok Mulubrhan (ERI)	XDS Astana Team	+ 1' 00"
8	Matteo Scalco (ITA)	XDS Astana Team	+ 1' 03"
9	Jordan Jegat (FRA)	Team TotalEnergies	+ 1' 04"
10	José Félix Parra (ESP)	Caja Rural–Seguros RGA	+ 1' 07"

=== Stage 6 ===
1 May 2026 — Antalya to Feslikan, 127.9 km (79.5 mi)

Stage 6 Result
Rank	Rider	Team	Time
1	Christian Bagatin (ITA)	MBH Bank CSB Telecom Fort	3h 23' 12"
2	Sebastian Berwick (AUS)	Caja Rural–Seguros RGA	+ 1' 01"
3	Jordan Jegat (FRA)	Team TotalEnergies	+ 1' 13"
4	Iván Sosa (COL)	Equipo Kern Pharma	+ 1' 13"
5	Kamiel Bonneu (BEL)	Solution Tech NIPPO Rali	+ 1' 27"
6	Jon Agirre (ESP)	Euskaltel–Euskadi	+ 1' 45"
7	Mikel Bizkarra (ESP)	Euskaltel–Euskadi	+ 1' 48"
8	Darren van Bekkum (NED)	XDS Astana Team	+ 1' 52"
9	Alessandro Fancellu (ITA)	MBH Bank CSB Telecom Fort	+ 1' 54"
10	Henok Mulubrhan (ERI)	XDS Astana Team	+ 2' 01"

General classification after Stage 6
Rank	Rider	Team	Time
1	Sebastian Berwick (AUS)	Caja Rural–Seguros RGA	21h 03' 03"
2	Iván Sosa (COL)	Equipo Kern Pharma	+ 5"
3	Kamiel Bonneu (BEL)	Solution Tech NIPPO Rali	+ 59"
4	Jordan Jegat (FRA)	Team TotalEnergies	+ 1' 05"
5	Nicolas Breuillard (FRA)	Team TotalEnergies	+ 1' 14"
6	Alessandro Fancellu (ITA)	MBH Bank CSB Telecom Fort	+ 1' 20"
7	Mikel Bizkarra (ESP)	Euskaltel–Euskadi	+ 1' 47"
8	Henok Mulubrhan (ERI)	XDS Astana Team	+ 1' 53"
9	Ibon Ruiz (ESP)	Equipo Kern Pharma	+ 2' 17"
10	José Félix Parra (ESP)	Caja Rural–Seguros RGA	+ 2' 37"

=== Stage 7 ===
2 May 2026 — Antalya to Antalya, 152.8 km (94.9 mi)

Stage 7 Result
Rank	Rider	Team	Time
1	Davide Ballerini (ITA)	XDS Astana Team	3h 19' 41"
2	Marceli Bogusławski (POL)	ATT Investments	+ 0"
3	Tom Crabbe (BEL)	Team Flanders–Baloise	+ 0"
4	Mustafa Tarakcı (TUR)	Konya Büyükşehir Belediyespor	+ 0"
5	Fernando Gaviria (COL)	Caja Rural–Seguros RGA	+ 0"
6	Stefano Oldani (ITA)	Caja Rural–Seguros RGA	+ 0"
7	Riley Pickrell (CAN)	Modern Adventure Pro Cycling	+ 0"
8	Tommaso Nencini (ITA)	Solution Tech NIPPO Rali	+ 0"
9	Sean Flynn (GBR)	Team Picnic–PostNL	+ 0"
10	Marco Manenti (ITA)	Bardiani–CSF 7 Saber	+ 0"

General classification after Stage 7
Rank	Rider	Team	Time
1	Sebastian Berwick (AUS)	Caja Rural–Seguros RGA	24h 22' 44"
2	Iván Sosa (COL)	Equipo Kern Pharma	+ 5"
3	Kamiel Bonneu (BEL)	Solution Tech NIPPO Rali	+ 59"
4	Jordan Jegat (FRA)	Team TotalEnergies	+ 1' 05"
5	Nicolas Breuillard (FRA)	Team TotalEnergies	+ 1' 14"
6	Alessandro Fancellu (ITA)	MBH Bank CSB Telecom Fort	+ 1' 20"
7	Mikel Bizkarra (ESP)	Euskaltel–Euskadi	+ 1' 47"
8	Henok Mulubrhan (ERI)	XDS Astana Team	+ 1' 53"
9	Ibon Ruiz (ESP)	Equipo Kern Pharma	+ 2' 17"
10	José Félix Parra (ESP)	Caja Rural–Seguros RGA	+ 2' 37"

=== Stage 8 ===
3 May 2026 — Ankara to Ankara, 105.2 km (65.4 mi)

Stage 8 Result
Rank	Rider	Team	Time
1	Tom Crabbe (BEL)	Team Flanders–Baloise	2h 11' 35"
2	Jelle Vermoote (BEL)	Tarteletto–Isorex	+ 0"
3	Stanisław Aniołkowski (POL)	Cofidis	+ 0"
4	Nicolas Breuillard (FRA)	Team TotalEnergies	+ 0"
5	Davide Ballerini (ITA)	XDS Astana Team	+ 0"
6	Henok Mulubrhan (ERI)	XDS Astana Team	+ 0"
7	Stefano Oldani (ITA)	Caja Rural–Seguros RGA	+ 0"
8	Marc Brustenga (ESP)	Team Polti VisitMalta	+ 0"
9	Dario Igor Belletta (ITA)	Team Polti VisitMalta	+ 0"
10	Gabriele Raccagni (ITA)	Team Polti VisitMalta	+ 0"

General classification after Stage 8
Rank	Rider	Team	Time
1	Sebastian Berwick (AUS)	Caja Rural–Seguros RGA	26h 34' 19"
2	Iván Sosa (COL)	Equipo Kern Pharma	+ 5"
3	Kamiel Bonneu (BEL)	Solution Tech NIPPO Rali	+ 59"
4	Jordan Jegat (FRA)	Team TotalEnergies	+ 1' 05"
5	Nicolas Breuillard (FRA)	Team TotalEnergies	+ 1' 14"
6	Alessandro Fancellu (ITA)	MBH Bank CSB Telecom Fort	+ 1' 20"
7	Mikel Bizkarra (ESP)	Euskaltel–Euskadi	+ 1' 47"
8	Henok Mulubrhan (ERI)	XDS Astana Team	+ 1' 53"
9	Ibon Ruiz (ESP)	Equipo Kern Pharma	+ 2' 17"
10	José Félix Parra (ESP)	Caja Rural–Seguros RGA	+ 2' 37"

== Classification leadership table ==
Classification leadership by stage
Stage	Winner	General classification	Points classification	Mountains classification	Beauties of Turkey Sprints classification	Team classification
1	Tom Crabbe	Tom Crabbe	Tom Crabbe	Michał Pomorski	Michał Pomorski	Caja Rural–Seguros RGA
2	Tom Crabbe	Tom Crabbe	Tom Crabbe	Michał Pomorski	Michał Pomorski	Caja Rural–Seguros RGA
3	Iván Sosa	Iván Sosa	Tom Crabbe	Iván Sosa	Michał Pomorski	XDS Astana Team
4	Stanisław Aniołkowski	Iván Sosa	Tom Crabbe	Iván Sosa	Mustafa Tarakcı	XDS Astana Team
5	Casper van Uden	Iván Sosa	Tom Crabbe	Iván Sosa	Mustafa Tarakcı	XDS Astana Team
6	Christian Bagatin	Sebastian Berwick	Tom Crabbe	Sebastian Berwick	Mustafa Tarakcı	XDS Astana Team
7	Davide Ballerini	Sebastian Berwick	Davide Ballerini	Sebastian Berwick	Mustafa Tarakcı	XDS Astana Team
8	Tom Crabbe	Sebastian Berwick	Tom Crabbe	Sebastian Berwick	Mustafa Tarakcı	XDS Astana Team
Final		Sebastian Berwick	Tom Crabbe	Sebastian Berwick	Mustafa Tarakcı	XDS Astana Team

== Classification standings ==
Legend
General classification	Denotes the winner of the general classification	Mountain classification	Denotes the winner of the mountains classification
Points classification	Denotes the winner of the points classification	Beauties of Turkey Sprints classification	Denotes the winner of the Beauties of Turkey Sprints classification

=== General classification ===
Final general classification (1–10)
Rank	Rider	Team	Time
1	Sebastian Berwick (AUS)	Caja Rural–Seguros RGA	26h 34' 19"
2	Iván Sosa (COL)	Equipo Kern Pharma	+ 5"
3	Kamiel Bonneu (BEL)	Solution Tech NIPPO Rali	+ 59"
4	Jordan Jegat (FRA)	Team TotalEnergies	+ 1' 05"
5	Nicolas Breuillard (FRA)	Team TotalEnergies	+ 1' 14"
6	Alessandro Fancellu (ITA)	MBH Bank CSB Telecom Fort	+ 1' 20"
7	Mikel Bizkarra (ESP)	Euskaltel–Euskadi	+ 1' 47"
8	Henok Mulubrhan (ERI)	XDS Astana Team	+ 1' 53"
9	Ibon Ruiz (ESP)	Equipo Kern Pharma	+ 2' 17"
10	José Félix Parra (ESP)	Caja Rural–Seguros RGA	+ 2' 37"

=== Points classification ===
Final points classification (1–10)
Rank	Rider	Team	Points
1	Tom Crabbe (BEL)	Team Flanders–Baloise	62
2	Davide Ballerini (ITA)	XDS Astana Team	59
3	Stanisław Aniołkowski (POL)	Cofidis	41
4	Stefano Oldani (ITA)	Caja Rural–Seguros RGA	41
5	Henok Mulubrhan (ERI)	XDS Astana Team	35
6	César Macías (MEX)	Burgos Burpellet BH	31
7	Nicolas Breuillard (FRA)	Team TotalEnergies	30
8	Davide Persico (ITA)	MBH Bank CSB Telecom Fort	30
9	Sebastian Berwick (AUS)	Caja Rural–Seguros RGA	28
10	Riley Pickrell (CAN)	Modern Adventure Pro Cycling	28

=== Mountains classification ===
Final mountains classification (1–10)
Rank	Rider	Team	Points
1	Sebastian Berwick (AUS)	Caja Rural–Seguros RGA	24
2	Iván Sosa (COL)	Equipo Kern Pharma	23
3	Christian Bagatin (ITA)	MBH Bank CSB Telecom Fort	15
4	Jordan Jegat (FRA)	Team TotalEnergies	13
5	Kamiel Bonneu (BEL)	Solution Tech NIPPO Rali	11
6	Jon Agirre (ESP)	Euskaltel–Euskadi	10
7	Mustafa Tekin (TUR)	Spor Toto Cycling Team	10
8	Nicolas Breuillard (FRA)	Team TotalEnergies	10
9	Alessandro Fancellu (ITA)	MBH Bank CSB Telecom Fort	8
10	Rudolf Remkhi (KAZ)	Muğla Büyükşehir Belediyesi Spor Kulübü	6

=== Beauties of Turkey Sprints classification ===
Final Beauties of Turkey Sprints classification (1–10)
Rank	Rider	Team	Points
1	Mustafa Tarakcı (TUR)	Konya Büyükşehir Belediyespor	20
2	Michał Pomorski (POL)	ATT Investments	17
3	Burak Abay (TUR)	Konya Büyükşehir Belediyespor	5
4	Fabien Doubey (FRA)	Team TotalEnergies	5
5	Feritcan Şamlı (TUR)	Spor Toto Cycling Team	5
6	Javier Ibáñez (ESP)	Caja Rural–Seguros RGA	4
7	Zeno Moonen (BEL)	Tarteletto–Isorex	3
8	Ramazan Yilmaz (TUR)	Konya Büyükşehir Belediyespor	3
9	Geoffrey Bouchard (FRA)	Team TotalEnergies	1
10	Iker Mintegi (ESP)	Euskaltel–Euskadi	1

=== Team classification ===
Final team classification (1–10)
Rank	Team	Time
1	(Kazakhstan) XDS Astana Team	79h 49' 09"
2	(France) Team TotalEnergies	+ 2' 11"
3	(Spain) Euskaltel–Euskadi	+ 2' 25"
4	(Spain) Caja Rural–Seguros RGA	+ 4' 36"
5	(France) Unibet Rose Rockets	+ 5' 54"
6	(Spain) Burgos Burpellet BH	+ 10' 08"
7	(Hungary) MBH Bank CSB Telecom Fort	+ 23' 30"
8	(Italy) Team Polti VisitMalta	+ 26' 03"
9	(France) Cofidis	+ 26' 05"
10	(Spain) Equipo Kern Pharma	+ 34' 16"
