= Nicolas Breuillard =

French bicycle racer

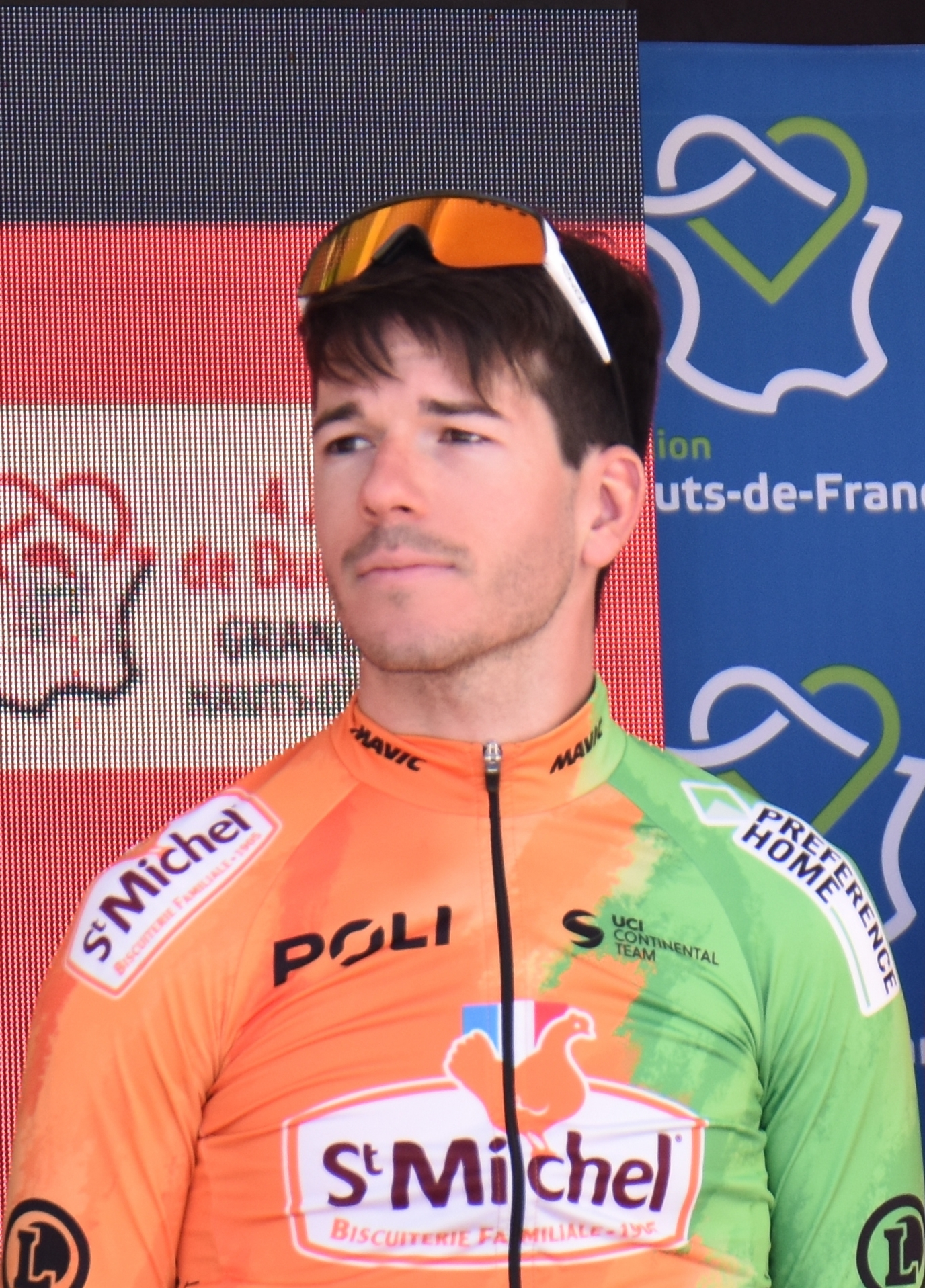
- Breuillard in 2025

Personal information
- Born: 13 March 2000 (age 26) Pertuis, France
- Height: 1.75 m (5 ft 9 in)

Cycling career
- Sport: Cycling
- Current team: Team TotalEnergies
- Discipline: Road
- Role: Rider

Amateur team
- 2020–2023: AVC Aix-en-Provence

Professional teams
- 2024–2025: St. Michel–Mavic–Auber93
- 2026–: Team TotalEnergies

Nicolas Breuillard (born 13 March 2000) is a French cyclist, who currently rides for UCI ProTeam Team TotalEnergies.

== Major results ==
2022
1st Road race, National Under-23 Road Championships
2023
1st Stage 1 Tour de Moselle
2nd Overall Essor Breton
3rd Giro della Provincia di Biella
2024
6th Overall Tour de l'Ain
7th Overall Tour Alsace
2025
2nd Clàssica Camp de Morvedre
4th Polynormande
6th Overall Étoile de Bessèges
8th Tour du Jura Cycliste
10th Overall Région Pays de la Loire Tour
10th Classic Grand Besançon Doubs
2026 (1 pro win)
1st Stage 5 Tour de Langkawi
5th Overall Czech Tour
5th Overall Tour of Turkiye
8th Overall Tour de la Provence
8th Tour des Alpes-Maritimes
