= 2025 Tour of Britain =

Cycling race

2025 UCI ProSeries
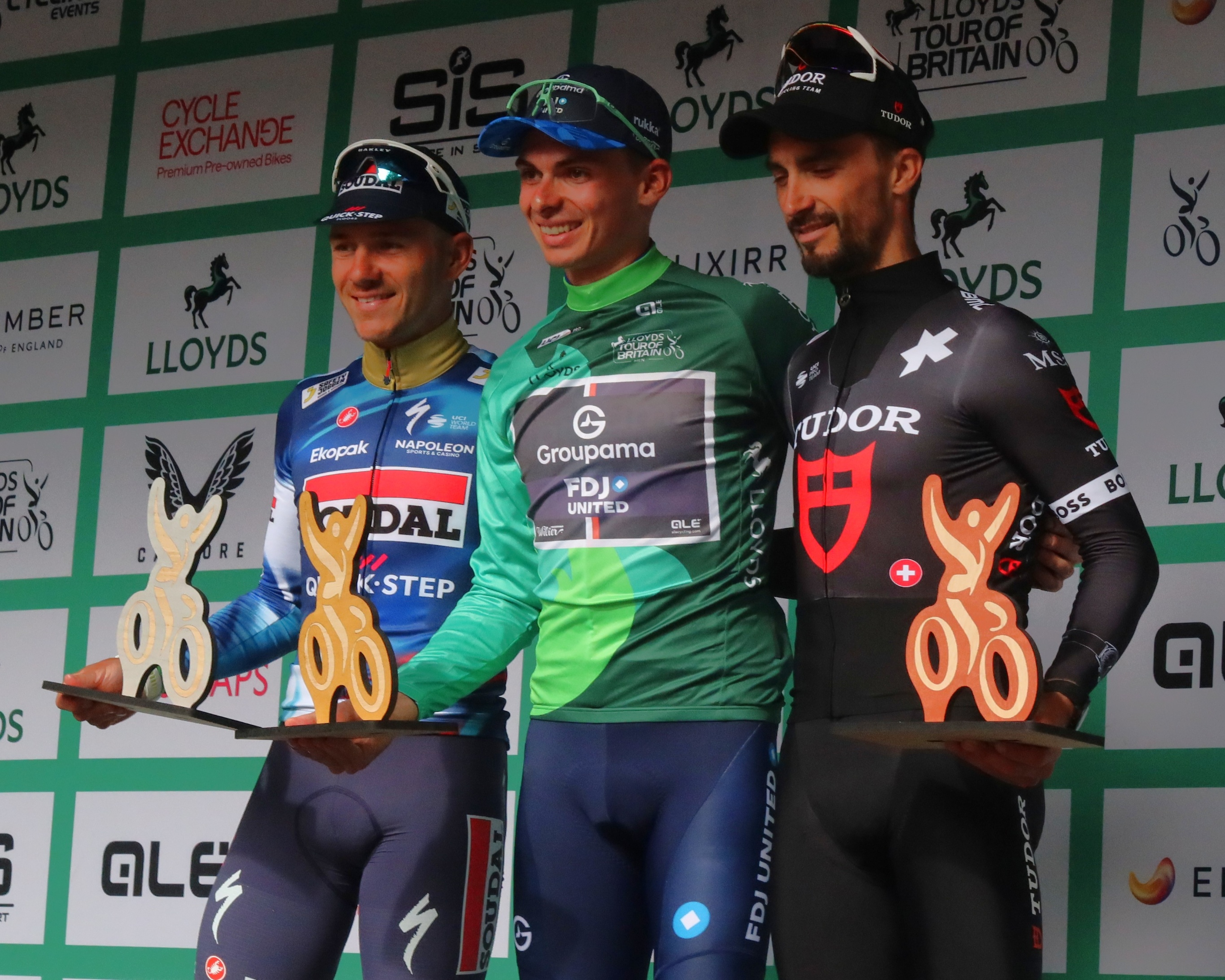
- The final podium: Evenepoel, Grégoire (winner) and Alahillipe

Race details
- Dates: 2 – 7 September 2025
- Stages: 6
- Distance: 886.1 km (550.6 mi)
- Winning time: 19h 31' 23"

Results
Jersey awarded to the overall winner	Winner	Romain Grégoire (FRA)	(Groupama–FDJ)
	Second	Remco Evenepoel (BEL)	(Soudal–Quick-Step)
	Third	Julian Alaphilippe (FRA)	(Tudor Pro Cycling Team)
Jersey awarded to the points classification winner	Points	Olav Kooij (NED)	(Visma–Lease a Bike)
Jersey awarded to the mountains classification winner	Mountains	Victor Vercouillie (BEL)	(Team Flanders–Baloise)
Jersey awarded to the young rider classification winner	Young rider	Romain Grégoire (FRA)	(Groupama–FDJ)
Jersey awarded to the combativity classification winner	Combativity	Joshua Golliker (GBR)	(Great Britain)
	Team	Team Bahrain Victorious	

The 2025 Tour of Britain was a men's professional road cycling stage race. It was the 84th British tour and the 21st edition of the modern version of the Tour of Britain. The race was part of the 2025 UCI ProSeries.

== Teams ==
Nine UCI WorldTeams, eight UCI ProTeams, one UCI Continental team and one national team make up the nineteen teams, from twelve countries in the race.

UCI WorldTeams

- Decathlon–AG2R La Mondiale
- Groupama–FDJ
- INEOS Grenadiers
- Lidl–Trek
- Soudal–Quick-Step
- Team Bahrain Victorious
- Team Picnic–PostNL
- UAE Team Emirates XRG
- Visma–Lease a Bike

UCI ProTeams

- Equipo Kern Pharma
- Israel–Premier Tech
- Lotto
- Q36.5 Pro Cycling Team
- Team Flanders–Baloise
- Tudor Pro Cycling Team
- Unibet Tietema Rockets
- Uno-X Mobility

UCI Continental Teams

- Anicolor / Tien 21

National Teams

- Great Britain

== Schedule ==
Stage hosts were announced in July 2025.

Stage characteristics and winners
Stage	Date	Route	Distance	Type	Stage winner
1	2 September	Woodbridge to Southwold	161.4 km (100.3 mi)	Flat stage	Olav Kooij (NED)
2	3 September	Stowmarket to Stowmarket	169.3 km (105.2 mi)	Flat stage	Olav Kooij (NED)
3	4 September	Milton Keynes to Ampthill	122.8 km (76.3 mi)	Flat stage	Matthew Brennan (GBR)
4	5 September	Atherstone to Burton Dassett Hills Country Park	186.9 km (116.1 mi)	Hilly stage	Romain Grégoire (FRA)
5	6 September	Torfaen to The Tumble	133.5 km (83.0 mi)	Medium Mountain stage	Remco Evenepoel (BEL)
6	7 September	Newport to Cardiff	112.2 km (69.7 mi)	Hilly stage	Olav Kooij (NED)
Total			886.1 km (550.6 mi)		

== Stages ==
=== Stage 1 ===
2 September 2025 – Woodbridge to Southwold, 161.4 km (100.3 mi)

Stage 1 Result
Rank	Rider	Team	Time
1	Olav Kooij (NED)	Visma–Lease a Bike	3h 29' 01"
2	Tord Gudmestad (NOR)	Decathlon–AG2R La Mondiale	+ 0"
3	Hugo Hofstetter (FRA)	Israel–Premier Tech	+ 0"
4	Tim Torn Teutenberg (GER)	Lidl–Trek	+ 0"
5	Alberto Dainese (ITA)	Tudor Pro Cycling Team	+ 0"
6	Samuel Watson (GBR)	INEOS Grenadiers	+ 0"
7	Tom Crabbe (BEL)	Team Flanders–Baloise	+ 0"
8	Alexander Kristoff (NOR)	Uno-X Mobility	+ 0"
9	Rory Townsend (IRL)	Q36.5 Pro Cycling Team	+ 0"
10	Jules Hesters (BEL)	Team Flanders–Baloise	+ 0"

General classification after Stage 1
Rank	Rider	Team	Time
1	Olav Kooij (NED)	Visma–Lease a Bike	3h 28' 51"
2	Tord Gudmestad (NOR)	Decathlon–AG2R La Mondiale	+ 4"
3	Hugo Hofstetter (FRA)	Israel–Premier Tech	+ 6"
4	Milan Lanhove (BEL)	Team Flanders–Baloise	+ 7"
5	Joshua Golliker (GBR)	Great Britain	+ 8"
6	Diego Uriarte (ESP)	Equipo Kern Pharma	+ 9"
7	Tim Torn Teutenberg (GER)	Lidl–Trek	+ 10"
8	Alberto Dainese (ITA)	Tudor Pro Cycling Team	+ 10"
9	Samuel Watson (GBR)	INEOS Grenadiers	+ 10"
10	Tom Crabbe (BEL)	Team Flanders–Baloise	+ 10"

=== Stage 2 ===
3 September 2025 – Stowmarket to Stowmarket, 169.3 km (105.2 mi)

Stage 2 Result
Rank	Rider	Team	Time
1	Olav Kooij (NED)	Visma–Lease a Bike	3h 44' 14"
2	Tom Crabbe (BEL)	Team Flanders–Baloise	+ 0"
3	Samuel Watson (GBR)	INEOS Grenadiers	+ 0"
4	Matevž Govekar (SLO)	Team Bahrain Victorious	+ 0"
5	Rory Townsend (IRL)	Q36.5 Pro Cycling Team	+ 0"
6	Marc Brustenga (ESP)	Equipo Kern Pharma	+ 0"
7	Luke Lamperti (USA)	Soudal–Quick-Step	+ 0"
8	Alberto Dainese (ITA)	Tudor Pro Cycling Team	+ 0"
9	Noa Isidore (FRA)	Decathlon–AG2R La Mondiale	+ 0"
10	Davide Bomboi (BEL)	Unibet Tietema Rockets	+ 0"

General classification after Stage 2
Rank	Rider	Team	Time
1	Olav Kooij (NED)	Visma–Lease a Bike	7h 12' 55"
2	Tom Crabbe (BEL)	Team Flanders–Baloise	+ 14"
3	Samuel Watson (GBR)	INEOS Grenadiers	+ 16"
4	Hugo Hofstetter (FRA)	Israel–Premier Tech	+ 16"
5	Andreas Stokbro (DEN)	Unibet Tietema Rockets	+ 17"
6	Milan Lanhove (BEL)	Team Flanders–Baloise	+ 17"
7	Joshua Golliker (GBR)	Great Britain	+ 18"
8	Baptiste Veistroffer (FRA)	Lotto	+ 18"
9	Alberto Dainese (ITA)	Tudor Pro Cycling Team	+ 20"
10	Rory Townsend (IRL)	Q36.5 Pro Cycling Team	+ 20"

=== Stage 3 ===
4 September 2025 – Milton Keynes to Ampthill, 122.8 km (76.3 mi)

Stage 3 Result
Rank	Rider	Team	Time
1	Matthew Brennan (GBR)	Visma–Lease a Bike	2h 35' 45"
2	Alberto Dainese (ITA)	Tudor Pro Cycling Team	+ 0"
3	Rui Oliveira (POR)	UAE Team Emirates XRG	+ 0"
4	Hugo Hofstetter (FRA)	Israel–Premier Tech	+ 0"
5	Milan Menten (BEL)	Lotto	+ 0"
6	Tim Torn Teutenberg (GER)	Lidl–Trek	+ 0"
7	Matevž Govekar (SLO)	Team Bahrain Victorious	+ 0"
8	Tom Crabbe (BEL)	Team Flanders–Baloise	+ 0"
9	Olav Kooij (NED)	Visma–Lease a Bike	+ 0"
10	Marc Brustenga (ESP)	Equipo Kern Pharma	+ 0"

General classification after Stage 3
Rank	Rider	Team	Time
1	Olav Kooij (NED)	Visma–Lease a Bike	9h 48' 40"
2	Matthew Brennan (GBR)	Visma–Lease a Bike	+ 10"
3	Alberto Dainese (ITA)	Tudor Pro Cycling Team	+ 14"
4	Tom Crabbe (BEL)	Team Flanders–Baloise	+ 14"
5	Mats Wenzel (LUX)	Equipo Kern Pharma	+ 14"
6	Hugo Hofstetter (FRA)	Israel–Premier Tech	+ 16"
7	Samuel Watson (GBR)	INEOS Grenadiers	+ 16"
8	Andreas Stokbro (DEN)	Unibet Tietema Rockets	+ 17"
9	Milan Lanhove (BEL)	Team Flanders–Baloise	+ 17"
10	Robin Froidevaux (SUI)	Tudor Pro Cycling Team	+ 18"

=== Stage 4 ===
5 September 2025 – Atherstone to Burton Dassett Hills Country Park, 186.9 km (116.1 mi)

Stage 4 Result
Rank	Rider	Team	Time
1	Romain Grégoire (FRA)	Groupama–FDJ	4h 06' 18"
2	Julian Alaphilippe (FRA)	Tudor Pro Cycling Team	+ 0"
3	Edoardo Zambanini (ITA)	Team Bahrain Victorious	+ 2"
4	Aurélien Paret-Peintre (FRA)	Decathlon–AG2R La Mondiale	+ 2"
5	Elias Maris (BEL)	Team Flanders–Baloise	+ 2"
6	Tim Torn Teutenberg (GER)	Lidl–Trek	+ 2"
7	Toon Aerts (BEL)	Lotto	+ 2"
8	Andreas Stokbro (DEN)	Unibet Tietema Rockets	+ 2"
9	Brady Gilmore (AUS)	Israel–Premier Tech	+ 2"
10	Afonso Eulálio (POR)	Team Bahrain Victorious	+ 2"

General classification after Stage 4
Rank	Rider	Team	Time
1	Romain Grégoire (FRA)	Groupama–FDJ	13h 55' 08"
2	Matthew Brennan (GBR)	Visma–Lease a Bike	+ 2"
3	Julian Alaphilippe (FRA)	Tudor Pro Cycling Team	+ 4"
4	Mats Wenzel (LUX)	Equipo Kern Pharma	+ 6"
5	Samuel Watson (GBR)	INEOS Grenadiers	+ 8"
6	Edoardo Zambanini (ITA)	Team Bahrain Victorious	+ 8"
7	Andreas Stokbro (DEN)	Unibet Tietema Rockets	+ 9"
8	Brady Gilmore (AUS)	Israel–Premier Tech	+ 12"
9	Milan Vader (NED)	Q36.5 Pro Cycling Team	+ 12"
10	Tim Torn Teutenberg (GER)	Lidl–Trek	+ 12"

=== Stage 5 ===
6 September 2025 – Torfaen to The Tumble, 133.5 km (83.0 mi)

Stage 5 Result
Rank	Rider	Team	Time
1	Remco Evenepoel (BEL)	Soudal–Quick-Step	3h 07' 56"
2	Thomas Gloag (GBR)	Visma–Lease a Bike	+ 0"
3	Oscar Onley (GBR)	Team Picnic–PostNL	+ 0"
4	Afonso Eulálio (POR)	Team Bahrain Victorious	+ 0"
5	Romain Grégoire (FRA)	Groupama–FDJ	+ 0"
6	Bauke Mollema (NED)	Lidl–Trek	+ 0"
7	Julian Alaphilippe (FRA)	Tudor Pro Cycling Team	+ 0"
8	Aurélien Paret-Peintre (FRA)	Decathlon–AG2R La Mondiale	+ 0"
9	Pello Bilbao (ESP)	Team Bahrain Victorious	+ 0"
10	Pavel Sivakov (FRA)	UAE Team Emirates XRG	+ 0"

General classification after Stage 5
Rank	Rider	Team	Time
1	Romain Grégoire (FRA)	Groupama–FDJ	17h 03' 04"
2	Remco Evenepoel (BEL)	Soudal–Quick-Step	+ 2"
3	Julian Alaphilippe (FRA)	Tudor Pro Cycling Team	+ 4"
4	Oscar Onley (GBR)	Team Picnic–PostNL	+ 8"
5	Aurélien Paret-Peintre (FRA)	Decathlon–AG2R La Mondiale	+ 12"
6	Afonso Eulálio (POR)	Team Bahrain Victorious	+ 12"
7	Ilan Van Wilder (BEL)	Soudal–Quick-Step	+ 12"
8	Bauke Mollema (NED)	Lidl–Trek	+ 12"
9	Pello Bilbao (ESP)	Team Bahrain Victorious	+ 17"
10	Pavel Sivakov (FRA)	UAE Team Emirates XRG	+ 17"

=== Stage 6 ===
7 September 2025 – Newport to Cardiff, 112.2 km (69.7 mi)

Stage 6 Result
Rank	Rider	Team	Time
1	Olav Kooij (NED)	Visma–Lease a Bike	2h 28' 19"
2	Samuel Watson (GBR)	INEOS Grenadiers	+ 0"
3	Fred Wright (GBR)	Team Bahrain Victorious	+ 0"
4	Edoardo Zambanini (ITA)	Team Bahrain Victorious	+ 0"
5	Noa Isidore (FRA)	Decathlon–AG2R La Mondiale	+ 0"
6	Julian Alaphilippe (FRA)	Tudor Pro Cycling Team	+ 0"
7	Bastien Tronchon (FRA)	Decathlon–AG2R La Mondiale	+ 0"
8	Tom Crabbe (BEL)	Team Flanders–Baloise	+ 0"
9	António Morgado (POR)	UAE Team Emirates XRG	+ 0"
10	Brady Gilmore (AUS)	Israel–Premier Tech	+ 0"

General classification after Stage 6
Rank	Rider	Team	Time
1	Romain Grégoire (FRA)	Groupama–FDJ	19h 31' 23"
2	Remco Evenepoel (BEL)	Soudal–Quick-Step	+ 2"
3	Julian Alaphilippe (FRA)	Tudor Pro Cycling Team	+ 4"
4	Oscar Onley (GBR)	Team Picnic–PostNL	+ 8"
5	Aurélien Paret-Peintre (FRA)	Decathlon–AG2R La Mondiale	+ 12"
6	Afonso Eulálio (POR)	Team Bahrain Victorious	+ 12"
7	Ilan Van Wilder (BEL)	Soudal–Quick-Step	+ 12"
8	Bauke Mollema (NED)	Lidl–Trek	+ 12"
9	Pello Bilbao (ESP)	Team Bahrain Victorious	+ 17"
10	Pavel Sivakov (FRA)	UAE Team Emirates XRG	+ 17"

== Classification leadership table ==
Classification leadership by stage
Stage	Winner	General classification	Points classification	Mountains classification	Young rider classification	Team classification	Combativity award
1	Olav Kooij	Olav Kooij	Olav Kooij	Milan Lanhove	Milan Lanhove	Decathlon–AG2R La Mondiale	Joshua Golliker
2	Olav Kooij	Olav Kooij	Olav Kooij	Andreas Stokbro	Tom Crabbe	Q36.5 Pro Cycling Team	Hartthijs de Vries
3	Matthew Brennan	Olav Kooij	Olav Kooij	Ben Chilton	Matthew Brennan	Decathlon–AG2R La Mondiale	Ben Chilton
4	Romain Grégoire	Romain Grégoire	Olav Kooij	Victor Vercouillie	Romain Grégoire	Lidl–Trek	Rory Townsend
5	Remco Evenepoel	Romain Grégoire	Olav Kooij	Victor Vercouillie	Romain Grégoire	Team Bahrain Victorious	Rafael Reis
6	Olav Kooij	Romain Grégoire	Olav Kooij	Victor Vercouillie	Romain Grégoire	Team Bahrain Victorious	Fred Wright
Final		Romain Grégoire	Olav Kooij	Victor Vercouillie	Romain Grégoire	Team Bahrain Victorious	Joshua Golliker

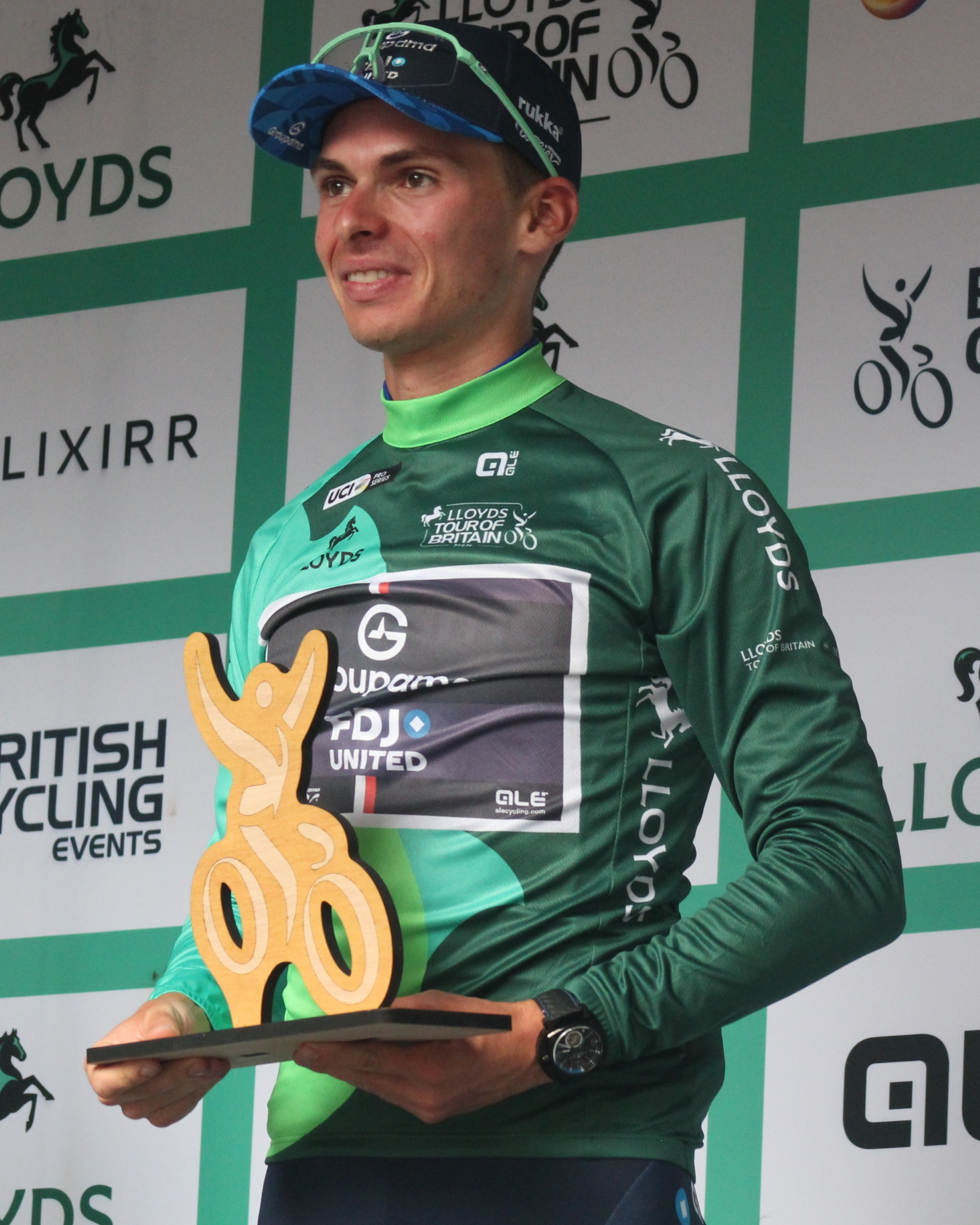
Romain Grégoire (general classification)

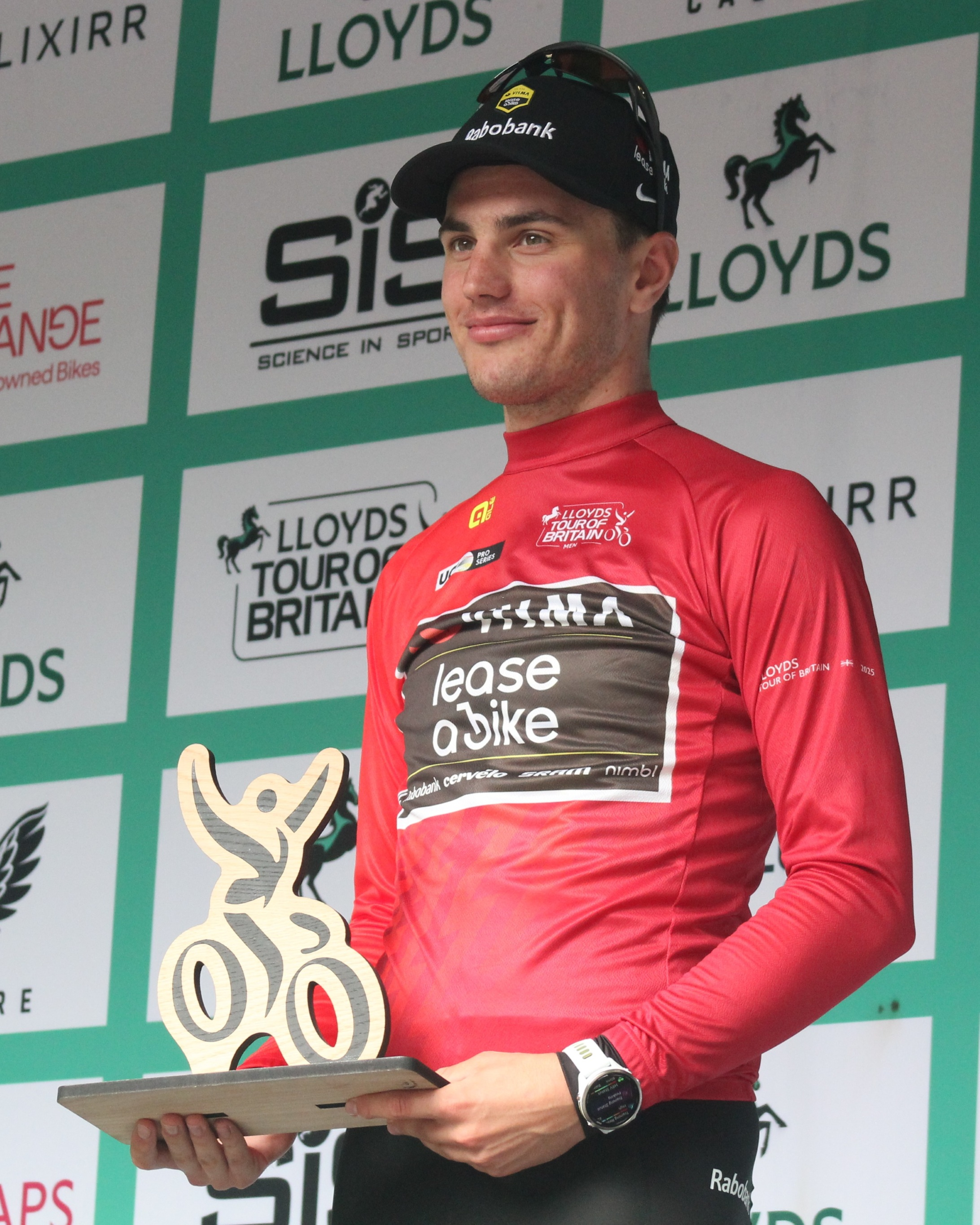
Olav Kooij
(points classification)

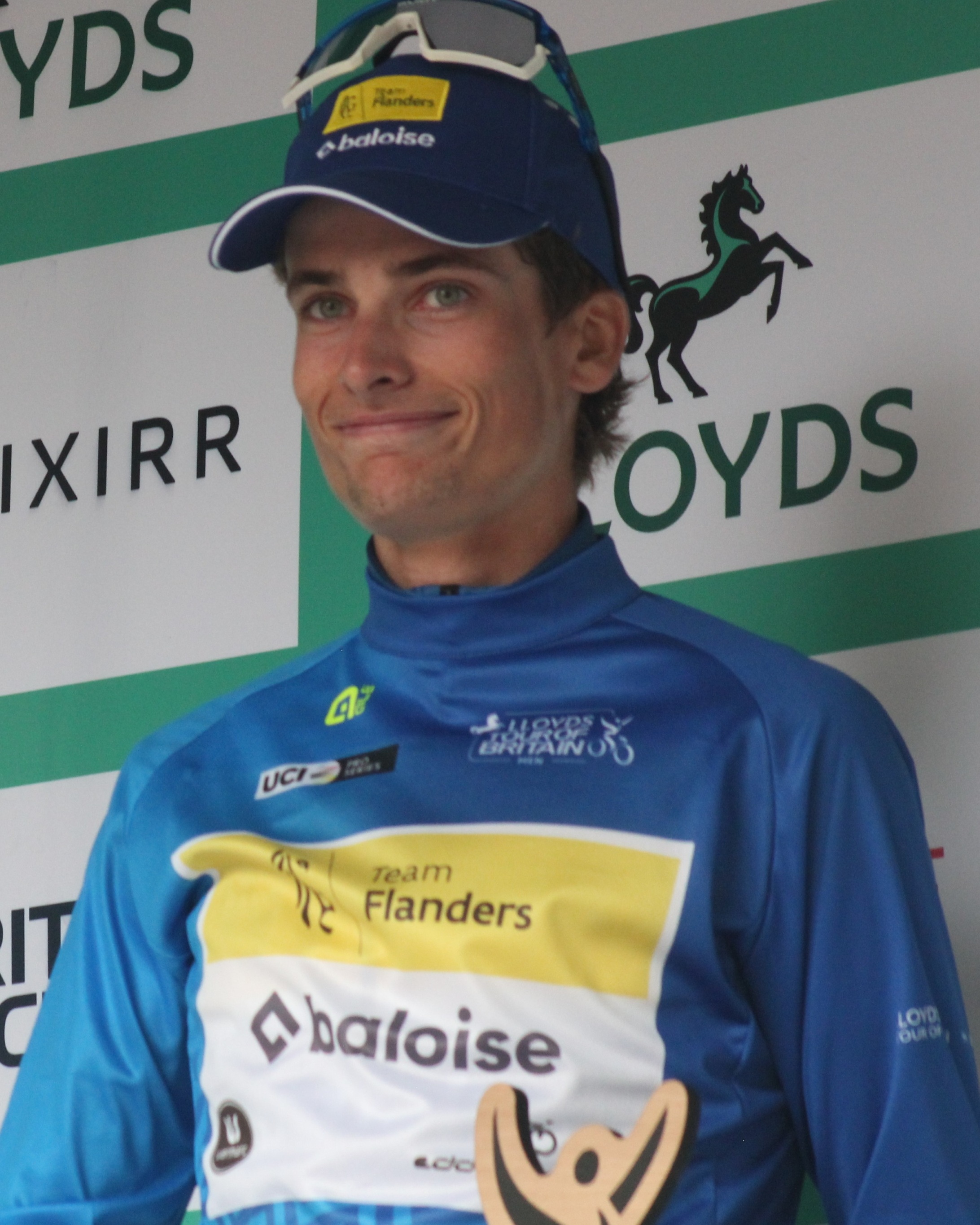
Victor Vercouillie (mountains)

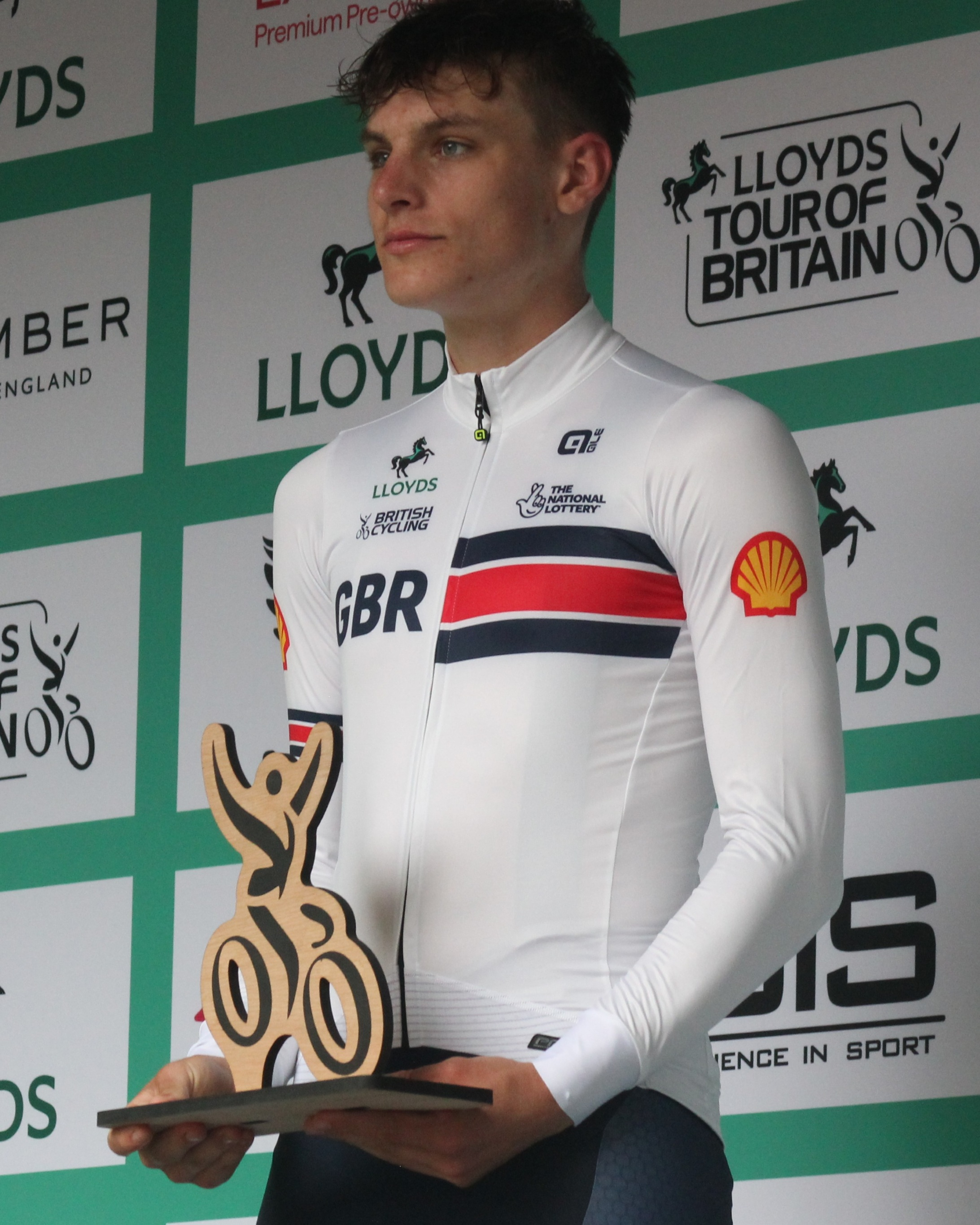
Joshua Golliker (combativity)

== Classification standings ==
Legend
Denotes the winner of the general classification	Denotes the winner of the mountains classification
Denotes the winner of the points classification	Denotes the winner of the young rider classification
Denotes the winner of the combativity award	

=== General classification ===
Final general classification (1–10)
Rank	Rider	Team	Time
1	Romain Grégoire (FRA)	Groupama–FDJ	19h 31' 23"
2	Remco Evenepoel (BEL)	Soudal–Quick-Step	+ 2"
3	Julian Alaphilippe (FRA)	Tudor Pro Cycling Team	+ 4"
4	Oscar Onley (GBR)	Team Picnic–PostNL	+ 8"
5	Aurélien Paret-Peintre (FRA)	Decathlon–AG2R La Mondiale	+ 12"
6	Afonso Eulálio (POR)	Team Bahrain Victorious	+ 12"
7	Ilan Van Wilder (BEL)	Soudal–Quick-Step	+ 12"
8	Bauke Mollema (NED)	Lidl–Trek	+ 12"
9	Pello Bilbao (ESP)	Team Bahrain Victorious	+ 17"
10	Pavel Sivakov (FRA)	UAE Team Emirates XRG	+ 17"

=== Points classification ===
Final points classification (1–10)
Rank	Rider	Team	Points
1	Olav Kooij (NED)	Visma–Lease a Bike	77
2	Samuel Watson (GBR)	INEOS Grenadiers	35
3	Romain Grégoire (FRA)	Groupama–FDJ	31
4	Matthew Brennan (GBR)	Visma–Lease a Bike	30
5	Tom Crabbe (BEL)	Team Flanders–Baloise	28
6	Mats Wenzel (LUX)	Equipo Kern Pharma	27
7	Julian Alaphilippe (FRA)	Tudor Pro Cycling Team	27
8	Alberto Dainese (ITA)	Tudor Pro Cycling Team	27
9	Remco Evenepoel (BEL)	Soudal–Quick-Step	25
10	Edoardo Zambanini (ITA)	Team Bahrain Victorious	20

=== Mountains classification ===
Final mountains classification (1–10)
Rank	Rider	Team	Points
1	Victor Vercouillie (BEL)	Team Flanders–Baloise	36
2	Romain Grégoire (FRA)	Groupama–FDJ	26
3	Joshua Golliker (GBR)	Great Britain	19
4	Remco Evenepoel (BEL)	Soudal–Quick-Step	18
5	Mats Wenzel (LUX)	Equipo Kern Pharma	17
6	Rafael Reis (POR)	Anicolor / Tien 21	15
7	Bastien Tronchon (FRA)	Decathlon–AG2R La Mondiale	14
8	Julian Alaphilippe (FRA)	Tudor Pro Cycling Team	13
9	Oscar Onley (GBR)	Team Picnic–PostNL	12
10	Thomas Gloag (GBR)	Visma–Lease a Bike	12

=== Young rider classification ===
Final young rider classification (1–10)
Rank	Rider	Team	Time
1	Romain Grégoire (FRA)	Groupama–FDJ	19h 31' 23"
2	Mathys Rondel (FRA)	Tudor Pro Cycling Team	+ 17"
3	Joe Blackmore (GBR)	Israel–Premier Tech	+ 17"
4	Andrew August (USA)	INEOS Grenadiers	+ 30"
5	Matthew Brennan (GBR)	Visma–Lease a Bike	+ 31"
6	Milan Lanhove (BEL)	Team Flanders–Baloise	+ 58"
7	Huw Buck-Jones (GBR)	Great Britain	+ 2' 33"
8	Noa Isidore (FRA)	Decathlon–AG2R La Mondiale	+ 7' 12"
9	Tom Crabbe (BEL)	Team Flanders–Baloise	+ 9' 55"
10	Patrick Frydkjær (DEN)	Lidl–Trek	+ 10' 26"

=== Team classification ===
Final team classification (1–10)
Rank	Team	Time
1	Team Bahrain Victorious	58h 35' 57"
2	(Portugal) Anicolor / Tien 21	+ 2' 31"
3	(United Kingdom) INEOS Grenadiers	+ 3' 39"
4	(United States) Lidl–Trek	+ 3' 59"
5	(Belgium) Team Flanders–Baloise	+ 9' 05"
6	(United Arab Emirates) UAE Team Emirates XRG	+ 10' 58"
7	(Belgium) Soudal–Quick-Step	+ 11' 17"
8	(Switzerland) Q36.5 Pro Cycling Team	+ 12' 35"
9	(Netherlands) Visma–Lease a Bike	+ 12' 49"
10	(France) Unibet Tietema Rockets	+ 14' 03"
