= Tom Crabbe =

Belgian cyclist (born 2005)

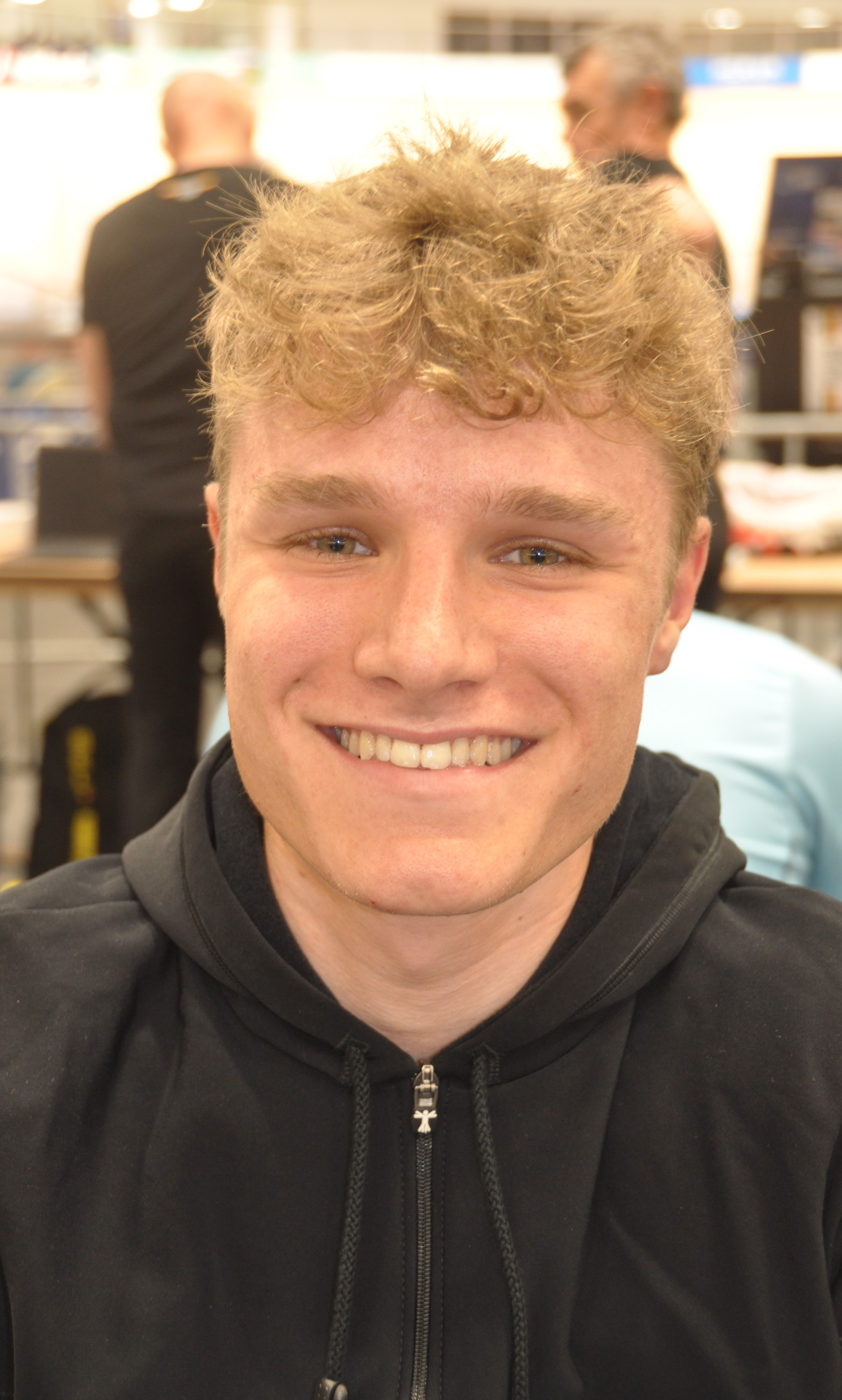
- Crabbe in 2025

Personal information
- Born: 2 June 2005 (age 21) Jette, Belgium
- Height: 1.79 m (5 ft 10 in)
- Weight: 70 kg (154 lb)

Cycling career
- Sport: Cycling
- Current team: Team Flanders–Baloise
- Discipline: Road
- Rider type: Sprinter

Amateur teams
- 2022: WK Noord West Brabant U19
- 2023: AVIA–Rudyco Cycling Team

Professional teams
- 2024: Bingoal WB Devo Team
- 2025–: Team Flanders–Baloise
Medal record
Representing Belgium
Men's track cycling
European Under-23 Championships
Gold medal – first place	2025 Anadia	Elimination race
Bronze medal – third place	2024 Cottbus	Madison
World Junior Championships
Silver medal – second place	2023 Cali	Madison
European Junior Championships
Bronze medal – third place	2023 Anadia	Madison

Tom Crabbe (born 2 June 2005) is a Belgian road and track cyclist who rides for UCI ProSeries Team Flanders–Baloise. In 2025, Crabbe was the European under-23 champion in the elimination race.

== Career ==
Crabbe competed in judo as a child, before switching to cycling at eight years old.

On the road, Crabbe specializes as a sprinter. His breakthrough came in the 2025 Tour of Britain, where Crabbe finished in the top 10 in all four sprint stages of the race, including second place to Olav Kooij on stage 2. In February 2026, Crabbe took his first professional road victory at the Étoile de Bessèges, winning stage 1 in a sprint finish.

== Major results ==
=== Road ===
2024
Ronde van Vlaams-Brabant

1st Stages 3 & 5

3rd Road race, National Under-23 Championships
2025
2nd Trofee Maarten Wynants
7th Gullegem Koerse
9th Grand Prix de Fourmies
9th Heistse Pijl
2026 (5 pro wins)
Tour of Turkiye

1st Points classification
1st Stages 1, 2 & 8

1st Stage 4 Vuelta a Andalucía
1st Stage 1 Étoile de Bessèges
7th Ronde van Limburg
10th Scheldeprijs

=== Track ===
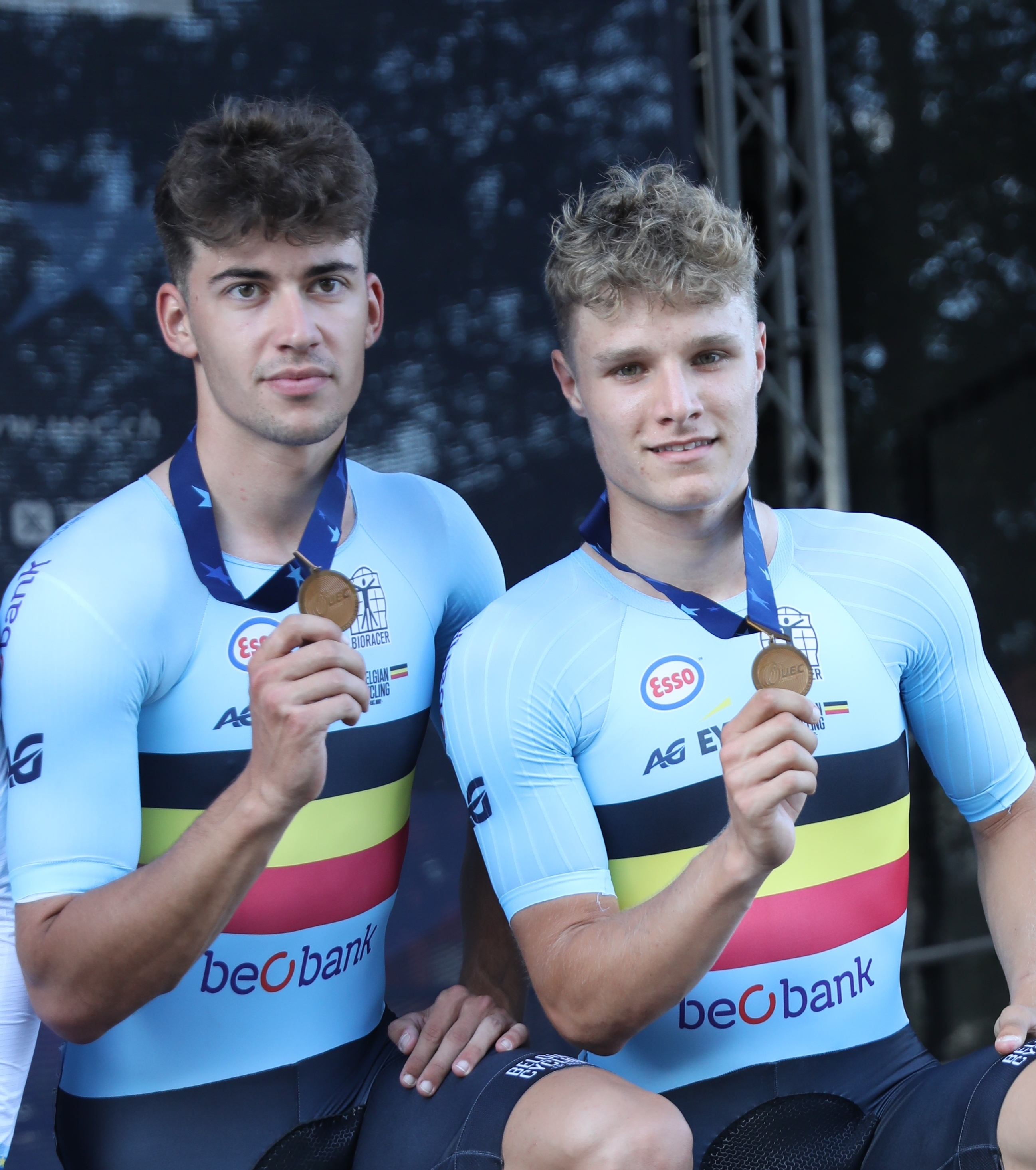
Crabbe (right) and madison partner Noah Vandenbranden at the 2024 European Under-23 Track Championships

2023
2nd Madison, UCI World Junior Championships (with Milan Van den Haute)
3rd Madison, UEC European Junior Championships (with Milan Van den Haute)
2024
3rd Madison, UEC European Under-23 Championships (with Noah Vandenbranden)
2025
1st Elimination, UEC European Under-23 Championships
