= Gotzon Martín =

Spanish road bicycle racer

Personal information
- Full name: Gotzon Martín Sanz
- Nickname: Orozkoko Potroa
- Born: 25 February 1996 (age 30) Orozko, Spain

Cycling career
- Sport: Cycling
- Current team: Euskaltel–Euskadi
- Discipline: Road
- Role: Rider

Amateur team
- 2015–2017: Fundación Euskadi–EDP

Professional team
- 2018–: Fundación Euskadi

Gotzon Martín Sanz (born 15 February 1996) is a Spanish cyclist, who currently rides for UCI ProTeam Euskaltel–Euskadi.

== Major results ==
2020
1st Mountains classification, Vuelta a Burgos
5th Giro dell'Appennino
2021
5th Memorial Marco Pantani
6th Overall CRO Race
8th Vuelta a Murcia
2022
8th Overall Vuelta a Asturias
10th Japan Cup
2023
1st Mountains classification, Vuelta a Andalucía
6th Classic Loire Atlantique
7th Clàssica Comunitat Valenciana 1969
10th Tour de Vendée
2025
6th Grand Prix La Marseillaise
8th Tour du Doubs

=== Grand Tour general classification results timeline ===
Grand Tour	2021	2022	2023	2024
Giro d'Italia	—	—	—	—
Tour de France	—	—	—	—
Vuelta a España	37	76	—	51

Legend
—	Did not compete
DNF	Did not finish
