= Sebastian Berwick =

Australian cyclist (born 1999)

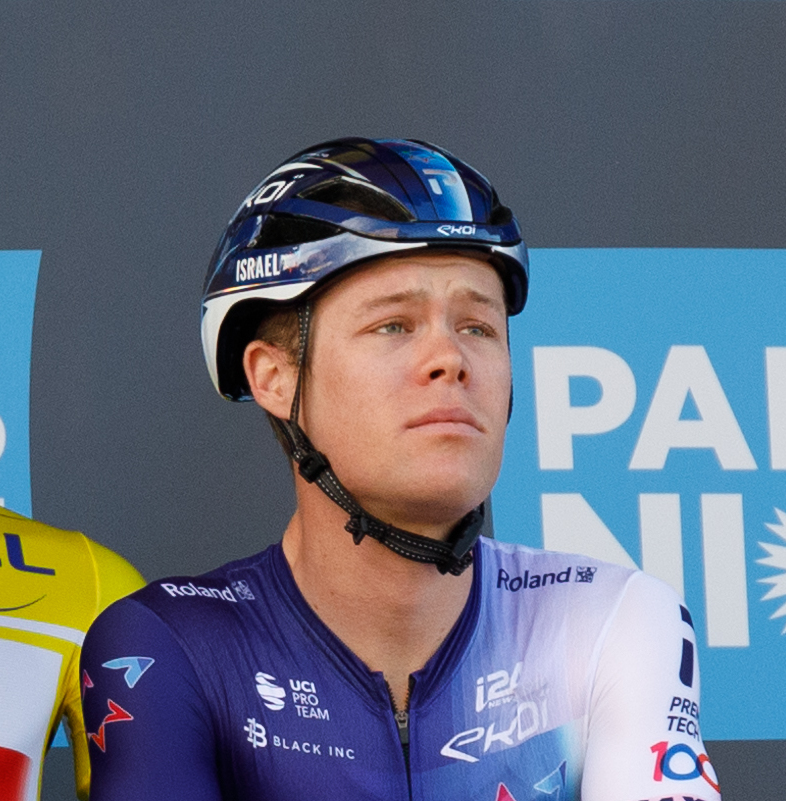
- Berwick in 2023

Personal information
- Born: 15 December 1999 (age 26) Wishart, Queensland, Australia
- Height: 1.75 m (5 ft 9 in)
- Weight: 59 kg (130 lb)

Cycling career
- Sport: Cycling
- Current team: Caja Rural–Seguros RGA
- Discipline: Road
- Role: Rider

Amateur teams
- 2016: Team UC Nantes Atlantique Junior
- 2018: Chambéry CF

Professional teams
- 2019–2020: St George Continental Cycling Team
- 2021–2023: Israel Start-Up Nation
- 2024–: Caja Rural–Seguros RGA

Major wins
- Stage races Tour of Turkiye (2026)

Sebastian Berwick (born 15 December 1999) is an Australian cyclist, who currently rides for UCI ProTeam Caja Rural–Seguros RGA.

== Major results ==
2017
Oceania Junior Road Championships

1st Road race
1st Time trial

3rd Time trial Commonwealth Youth Games
10th Time trial, UCI Junior Road World Championships
2019
10th Overall Tour of Thailand
2020
2nd Overall Herald Sun Tour

1st Young rider classification

2nd Road race, National Under-23 Championships
2021
1st Stage 1b (TTT) Settimana Internazionale di Coppi e Bartali
2022
3rd Overall Alpes Isère Tour

1st Mountains classification
1st Stage 5

2023 (1 pro win)
1st Overall Tour Alsace

1st Stage 3

2nd Overall Tour of Hainan

1st Stage 2

2025
5th Andorra MoraBanc Clàssica
2026 (1)
1st Overall Tour of Turkiye

1st Mountains classification

5th Overall Arctic Race of Norway
5th Overall Tour of Slovenia
6th Overall Tour of Oman
7th Milano–Torino

=== Grand Tour general classification results timeline ===
Grand Tour	2021	2022	2023	2024	2025	2026
Giro d'Italia	—	—	71	—	—	—
Tour de France	—	—	—	—	—	89
Vuelta a España	135	—	—	—	—	—

Legend
—	Did not compete
DNF	Did not finish
