= Urko Berrade =

Spanish cyclist (born 1997)

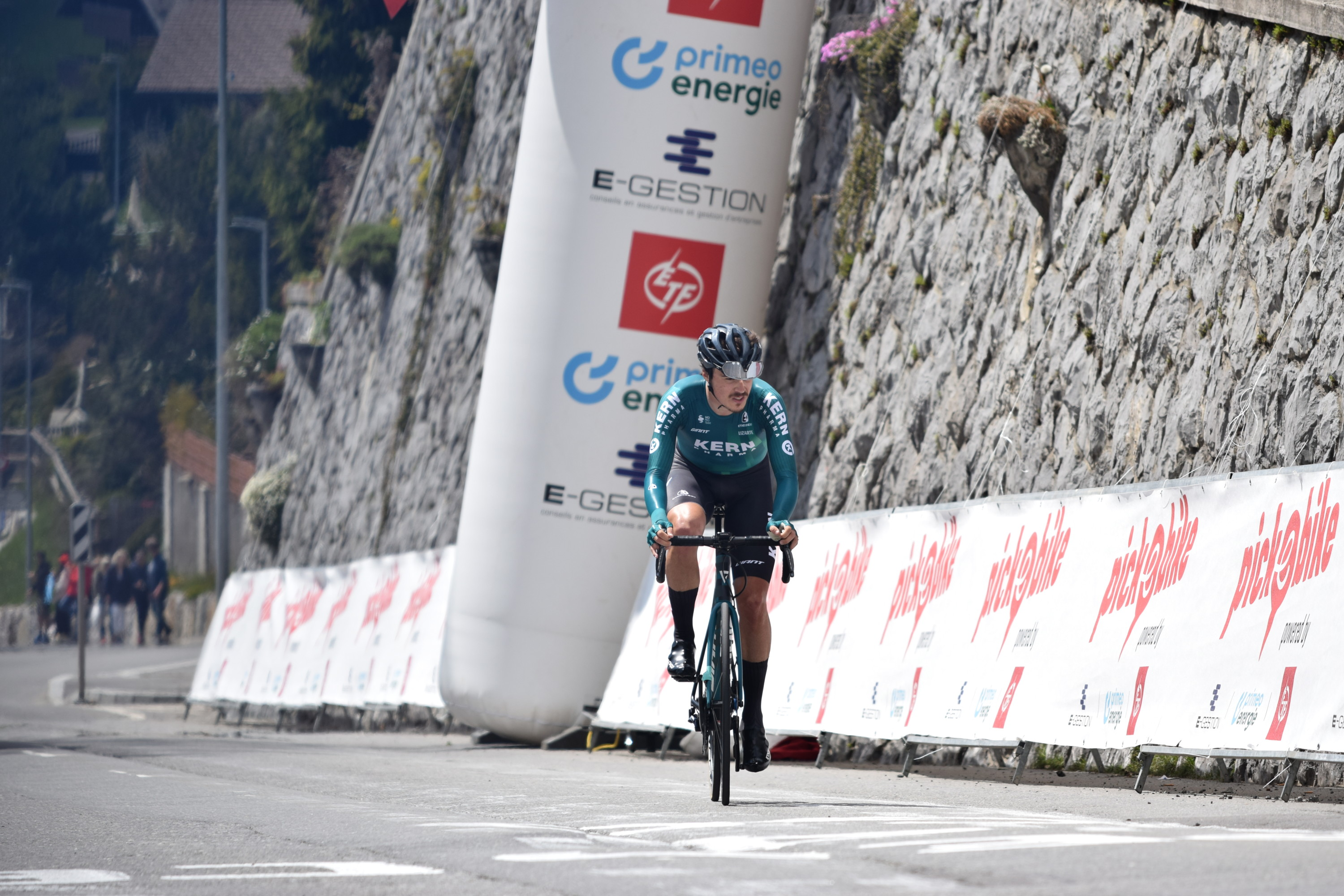
- Berrade at 2022 Tour de Romandie

Personal information
- Full name: Urko Berrade Fernández
- Born: 28 November 1997 (age 28) Pamplona, Spain
- Height: 1.84 m (6 ft 0 in)
- Weight: 68 kg (150 lb)

Cycling career
- Sport: Cycling
- Current team: Equipo Kern Pharma
- Discipline: Road
- Role: Rider

Amateur team
- 2016–2018: Lizarte

Professional teams
- 2019: Euskadi–Murias
- 2020–: Equipo Kern Pharma

Major wins
- Grand Tours Vuelta a España 1 individual stage (2024)

Urko Berrade Fernández (born 28 November 1997) is a Spanish cyclist, who currently rides for UCI ProTeam Equipo Kern Pharma.

== Major results ==
2020
5th Overall Giro della Friuli Venezia Giulia
2021
5th Overall CRO Race
5th Overall Tour du Limousin

1st Young rider classification

2022
8th Overall O Gran Camiño
2023
7th Overall Okolo Slovenska
7th Overall CRO Race
2024 (1 pro win)
1st Stage 18 Vuelta a España
4th Overall Vuelta a Burgos
2025
1st Classica Camp de Morvedre
6th Overall Tour du Limousin
10th Overall Vuelta a Burgos
10th Overall Tour de Luxembourg
2026
3rd Road race, National Road Championships
4th Overall Giro di Sardegna

=== Grand Tour general classification results timeline ===
Grand Tour	2022	2023	2024
Giro d'Italia	—	—	—
Tour de France	—	—	—
Vuelta a España	66	—	42

Legend
—	Did not compete
DNF	Did not finish
