= Tour Alsace =

French stage race

Race details
- Date: End July
- Region: Alsace, France
- English name: Tour of Alsace
- Local name(s): Tour Alsace, Tour d'Alsace
- Discipline: Road
- Competition: UCI Europe Tour
- Type: Stage race
- Organiser: Groupe Larger Organisation
- Race director: Francis Larger and Jean-Pierre Reverdy
- Web site: www.touralsace.fr

History
- First edition: 2004
- Editions: 21 (as of 2025)
- First winner: Stéphan Ravaleu (FRA)
- Most recent: Markel Beloki (ESP)

The Tour Alsace (or Tour d'Alsace) is a five-day road bicycle race held annually in Alsace, France. It was first held in 2004 and it is a 2.2 rated event on the UCI Europe Tour.

== Winners ==
| Year | Country | Rider | Team |
|---|---|---|---|
| 2004 | France | Stéphan Ravaleu | Oktos |
| 2005 | Moldova | Alexandre Sabalin | |
| 2006 | Germany | Johannes Fröhlinger | Gerolsteiner |
| 2007 | France | Benoît Luminet | CR4C Roanne |
| 2008 | Germany | Robert Bengsch | |
| 2009 | Switzerland | Simon Zahner | Bürgis Cycling |
| 2010 | Netherlands | Wilco Kelderman | Rabobank Continental Team |
| 2011 | France | Thibaut Pinot | FDJ |
| 2012 | Great Britain | Jonathan Tiernan-Locke | Endura Racing |
| 2013 | Germany | Silvio Herklotz | Team Stölting |
| 2014 | Czech Republic | Karel Hník | Etixx |
| 2015 | Norway | Vegard Stake Laengen | Team Joker |
| 2016 | Germany | Maximilian Schachmann | Klein Constantia |
| 2017 | Australia | Lucas Hamilton | Australia (national team) |
| 2018 | France | Geoffrey Bouchard | AG2R La Mondiale |
| 2019 | Great Britain | Tom Pidcock | Team Wiggins Le Col |
| 2020 | No race due to COVID-19 pandemic in France | | |
| 2021 | Spain | José Félix Parra | Equipo Kern Pharma |
| 2022 | Great Britain | Finlay Pickering | Équipe Continentale Groupama–FDJ |
| 2023 | Australia | Sebastian Berwick | Israel Premier Tech Academy |
| 2024 | France | Joris Delbove | St. Michel–Mavic–Auber93 |
| 2025 | Spain | Markel Beloki | EF Education–Aevolo |
| 2026 | No race | | |
