= José Félix Parra =

Spanish cyclist

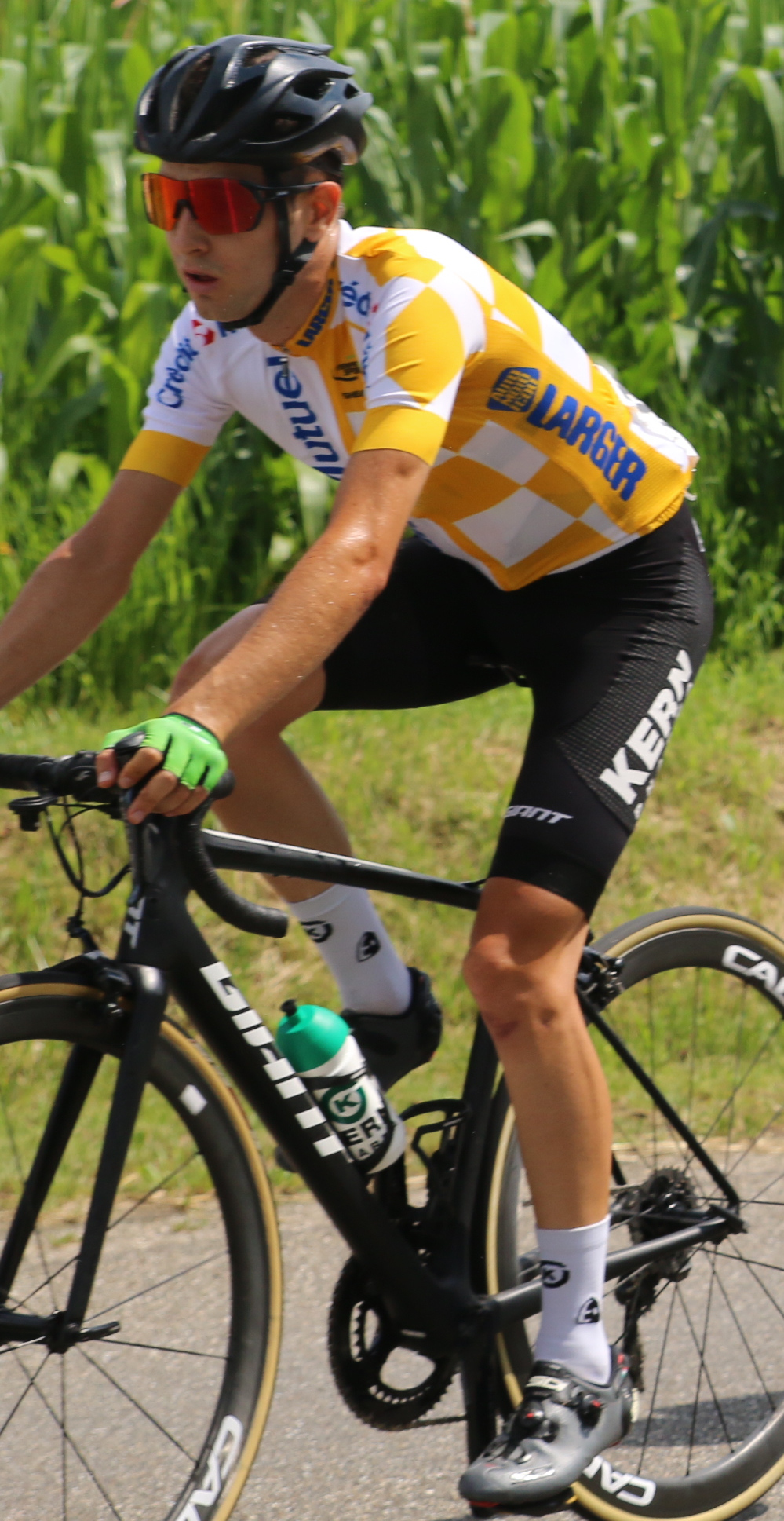
- José Félix Parra in the yellow jersey at the final stage of the Tour Alsace 2021

Personal information
- Full name: José Félix Parra Cuerda
- Born: 16 January 1997 (age 29) Ossa de Montiel, Spain
- Height: 1.71 m (5 ft 7 in)
- Weight: 57 kg (126 lb)

Cycling career
- Sport: Cycling
- Current team: Caja Rural–Seguros RGA
- Discipline: Road
- Role: Rider
- Rider type: Climber

Amateur teams
- 2014–2015: Flex-Fundación Contador
- 2016–2019: Lizarte

Professional teams
- 2020–2025: Equipo Kern Pharma
- 2026–: Caja Rural–Seguros RGA

José Félix Parra Cuerda (born 16 January 1997) is a Spanish cyclist, who currently rides for UCI ProTeam Caja Rural–Seguros RGA.

== Major results ==
2019
10th Overall Giro della Valle d'Aosta
2021
1st Overall Tour Alsace

1st Stage 4

7th Overall Volta a Portugal
9th Overall CRO Race
2023
8th Overall Czech Tour
2024
2nd Overall Alpes Isère Tour

1st Stage 5

5th Overall GP Beiras e Serra da Estrela
5th Giro della Romagna
2025
7th Overall Czech Tour
9th Overall Tour of Slovenia
9th Andorra MoraBanc Clàssica
2026
6th Overall O Gran Camiño
9th Overall Tour Auvergne-Rhône-Alpes
10th Overall Tour of Turkiye

=== Grand Tour general classification results timeline ===
Grand Tour	2022	2023	2024	2025	2026
Giro d'Italia	—	—	—	—	—
Tour de France	—	—	—	—	IP
Vuelta a España	26	—	17	—	—

Legend
—	Did not compete
DNF	Did not finish
