= Antonio Angulo =

Spanish road bicycle racer (born 1992)

Personal information
- Full name: Antonio Angulo Sampedro
- Born: 18 August 1992 (age 34) El Llano, Udías, Spain
- Height: 1.75 m (5 ft 9 in)
- Weight: 67 kg (148 lb)

Cycling career
- Sport: Cycling
- Current team: Burgos Burpellet BH
- Discipline: Road
- Role: Rider
- Rider type: Climber

Amateur teams
- 2011: Cueva El Soplao
- 2012: Azysa–Telco'm–Conor
- 2013–2014: Café Baqué–Conservas Campos
- 2015–2016: Gomur–Liébana 2017
- 2018: CC Rías Baixas

Professional teams
- 2015: Cycling Academy
- 2017: LA Alumínios / Metalusa Blackjack
- 2019: Efapel
- 2020–2022: Fundación–Orbea
- 2023–: Burgos BH

Antonio Angulo Sampedro (born 18 August 1992) is a Spanish cyclist, who currently rides for UCI ProTeam Burgos Burpellet BH.

== Major results ==
2015
1st Overall Copa de España amateur de ciclismo
1st Circuito Guadiana
5th Korona Kocich Gór
2016
1st Overall Copa de España amateur de ciclismo
1st Clàssica Xavier Tondo
1st Gran Premio San José
1st Stages 3 & 4 Vuelta Ciclista a León
1st Stage 3 Vuelta a Cantabria
1st Stage 2 Volta a Lleida
2nd Santikutz Klasika
3rd Overall Vuelta a Toledo
2018
1st Stage 2 Tour of Galicia
1st Stage 1 Vuelta a A Coruña
1st Stage 2 Vuelta a Alicante
2nd Overall Vuelta a Cantabria

1st Prologue

2019
2nd Overall Grande Prémio Abimota

1st Stage 3

6th Road race, National Road Championships
2020
10th Overall Tour du Limousin
2021
8th Overall Tour du Limousin
2022
5th Overall Tour de Bretagne
