= Equipo Kern Pharma =

Spanish cycling team

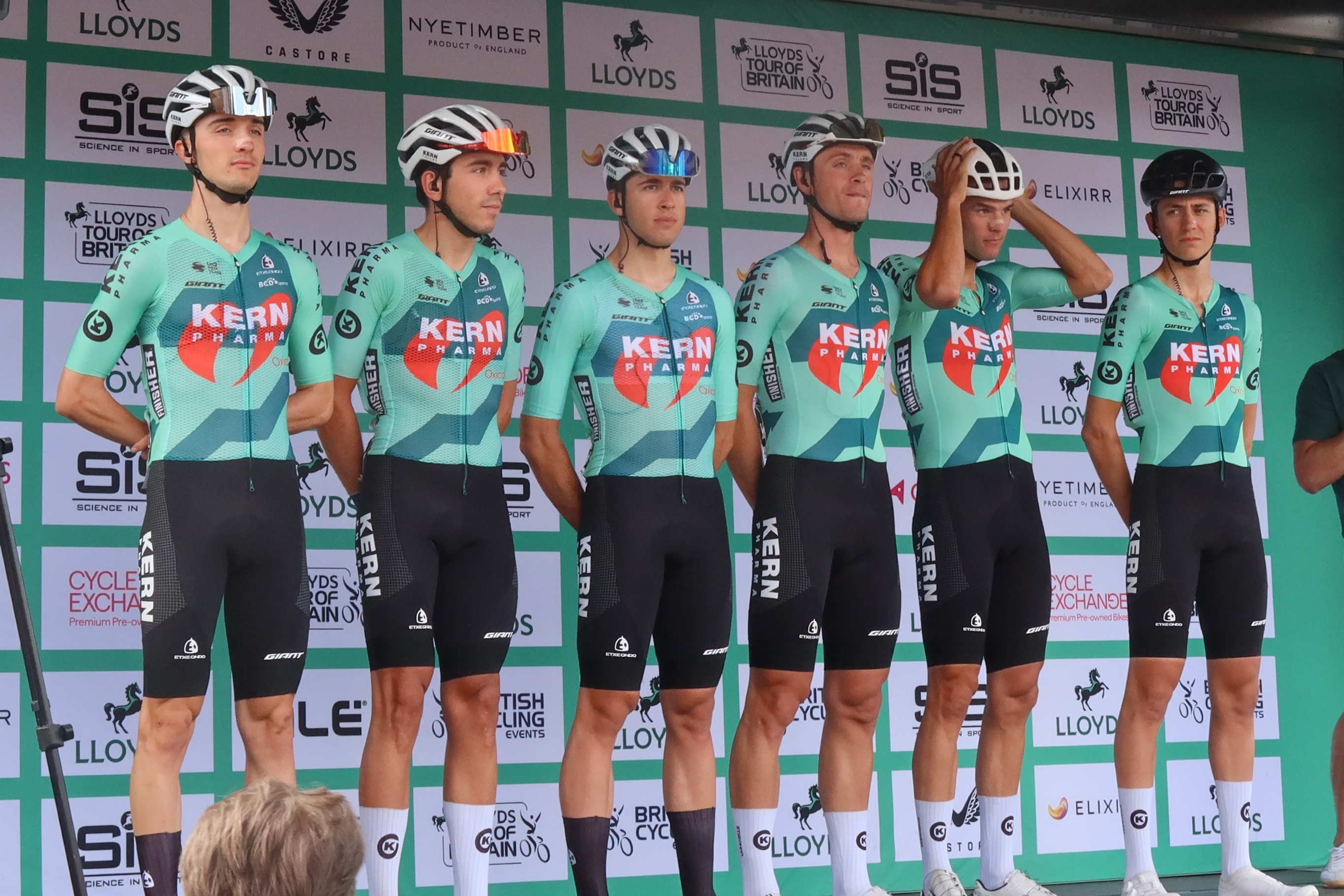
- The team at the 2025 Tour of Britain

Team information
- UCI code: EKP
- Registered: Spain
- Founded: 2020
- Discipline: Road
- Status: UCI Continental (2020); UCI ProTeam (2021–)
- Bicycles: Giant
- Website: Team home page

Key personnel
- General manager: Juan José Oroz
- Team managers: Jon Armendariz Iparragirre; Mikel Ezkieta; Haritzer Medina; Pablo Urtasun

Team name history
- 2020–: Equipo Kern Pharma

Equipo Kern Pharma is a Spanish UCI ProTeam road cycling team that was founded in 2020. The squad, run by the Asociación Deportiva Galibier, has a feeder team Lizarte, which has been competing in cycling since 1993.

The team was promoted from the UCI Continental level in 2021.

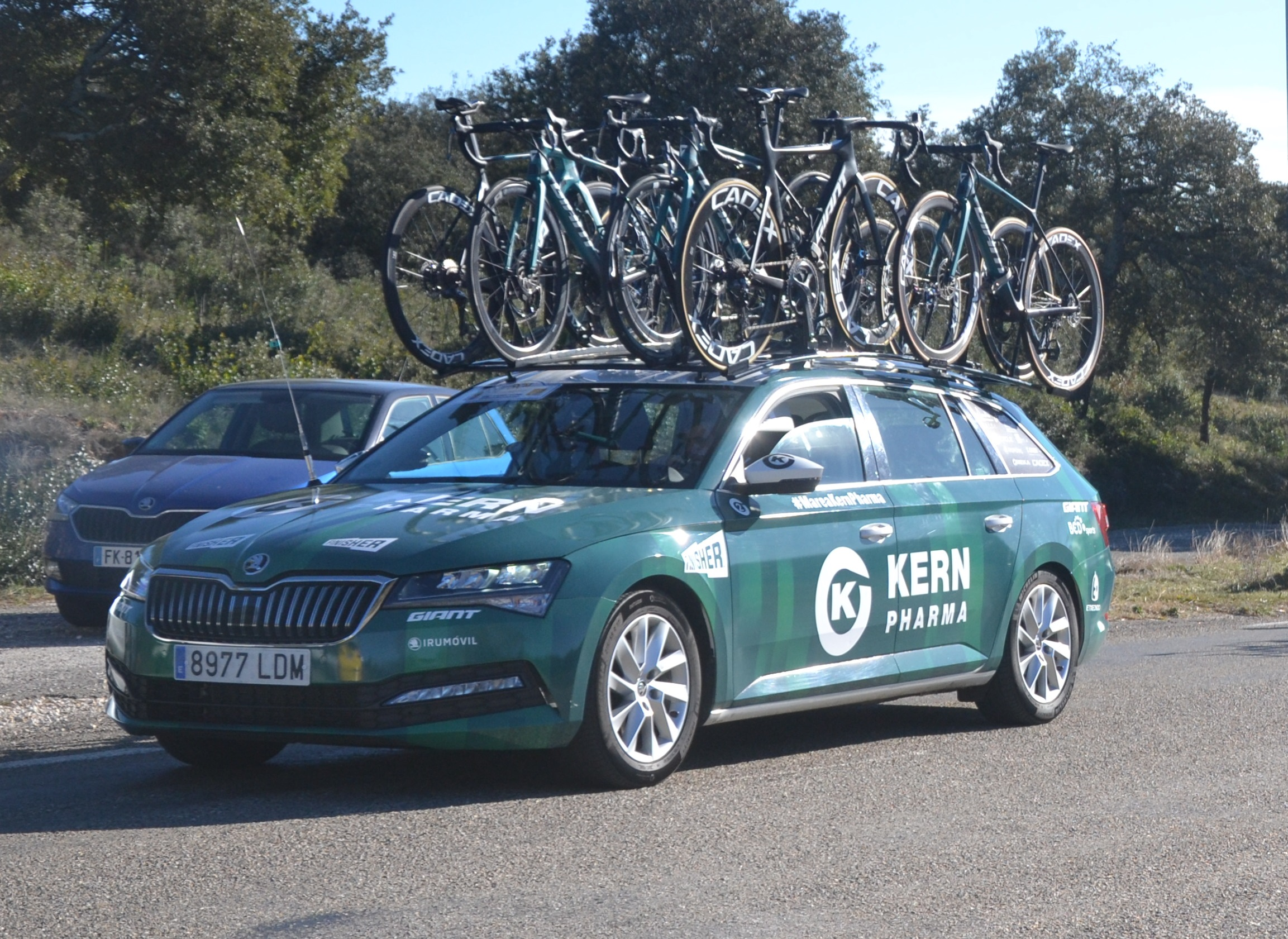
A team car

== Team roster ==
As of 29 January 2025.

Rider	Date of birth
Ibai Azanza (ESP)	22 February 2004 (aged 20)
Hugo Aznar (ESP)	1 December 2003 (aged 21)
Unai Aznar (ESP)	26 July 2002 (aged 22)
Urko Berrade (ESP)	28 November 1997 (aged 27)
Marc Brustenga (ESP)	4 September 1999 (aged 25)
Pablo Carrascosa (ESP)	7 October 2002 (aged 22)
Iván Cobo (ESP)	2 January 2000 (aged 24)
Iñigo Elosegui (ESP)	6 March 1998 (aged 26)
Haimar Etxeberria (ESP)	8 September 2003 (aged 21)
Miguel Ángel Fernández (ESP)	21 March 1997 (aged 27)
Kiko Galván (ESP)	1 December 1997 (aged 27)

Rider	Date of birth
Nil Gimeno (ESP)	21 April 2004 (aged 20)
Jorge Gutiérrez (ESP)	23 September 2002 (aged 22)
Unai Iribar (ESP)	12 June 1999 (aged 25)
Pau Miquel (ESP)	20 August 2000 (aged 24)
José Félix Parra (ESP)	16 January 1997 (aged 27)
Mikel Retegi (ESP)	27 April 2001 (aged 23)
Ibon Ruiz (ESP)	30 January 1999 (aged 25)
Iván Sosa (COL)	31 October 1997 (aged 27)
Antonio Jesús Soto (ESP)	24 December 1994 (aged 30)
Diego Uriarte (ESP)	26 October 2001 (aged 23)
Mats Wenzel (LUX)	19 December 2002 (aged 22)

== Major results ==
2020
Stage 3 Belgrade Banjaluka, Enrique Sanz
2021
Stage 6 Volta ao Alentejo, Enrique Sanz
Overall Tour Alsace, José Félix Parra

Stage 4, José Félix Parra

2022
Spain Time Trial Championships, Raúl García Pierna
Stage 2 Route d'Occitanie, Roger Adrià
2023
Stage 2 Tour de Taiwan, Jordí López
2024
Stage 5 Alpes Isère Tour, José Félix Parra
Stages 12 & 15, Pablo Castrillo, Vuelta a España
Stage 18, Urko Berrade, Vuelta a España
2025
Classica Camp de Morvedre, Urko Berrade
Stage 4 Vuelta a Andalucía, Diego Uriarte
2026
1st Region on Dodecanese GP, Iván Cobo
1st Stage 3 Presidential Cycling Tour of Turkiye, Iván Sosa
