= Clàssica Camp de Morvedre =

Spanish one-day road cycling race

Race details
- Date: January
- Region: Camp de Morvedre, Spain
- Discipline: Road race
- Competition: UCI Europe Tour
- Type: Single day race
- Web site: ccmestivella.com

History
- First edition: 1982
- Editions: 10 (as of 2026)
- First winner: Gottfried Schmutz (SUI)
- Most wins: Peter Hilse (GER) (2 wins)
- Most recent: Christian Scaroni (ITA)

The Clàssica Camp de Morvedre is an elite men's professional road cycling race held in the comarca of Camp de Morvedre, Spain.

The first edition of the race was in 1982, under the name Vuelta Camp de Morvedre, and was held continuously until 1989. The event then disappeared and did not return to the cycling calendar until 2025, as part of the UCI Europe Tour with a classification of 1.2. A year later, the race was promoted to 1.1 status.

== Winners ==
Year	Winner	Second	Third
Vuelta Camp de Morvedre
1982	(Switzerland) Gottfried Schmutz	(Spain) Marino Lejarreta	(Spain) Jesús Rodríguez Magro
1983	(Spain) Eduardo Chozas	(Spain) Juan Fernández	(Austria) Harald Maier
1984	(Spain) José Luis Laguía	(Spain) José Luis Navarro	(Spain) Guillermo Arenas
1985	(Spain) Javier Castellar	(France) Bernard Hinault	(Spain) Federico Echave
1986	(Germany) Peter Hilse	(Spain) Pedro Delgado	(Spain) Guillermo Arenas
1987	(France) Roland Le Clerc	(Republic of Ireland) Stephen Roche	(Spain) Pedro Delgado
1988	(Switzerland) Erich Mächler	(Germany) Peter Hilse	(France) Roland Le Clerc
1989	(Germany) Peter Hilse	(Germany) Rolf Gölz	(France) Laurent Jalabert
1990-2024	No race
Clàssica Camp de Morvedre
2025	(Spain) Urko Berrade	(France) Nicolas Breuillard	(Guatemala) Sergio Chumil
2026	(Italy) Christian Scaroni	(Colombia) Diego Pescador	(Italy) Antonio Tiberi
