= Marc Brustenga =

Spanish cyclist

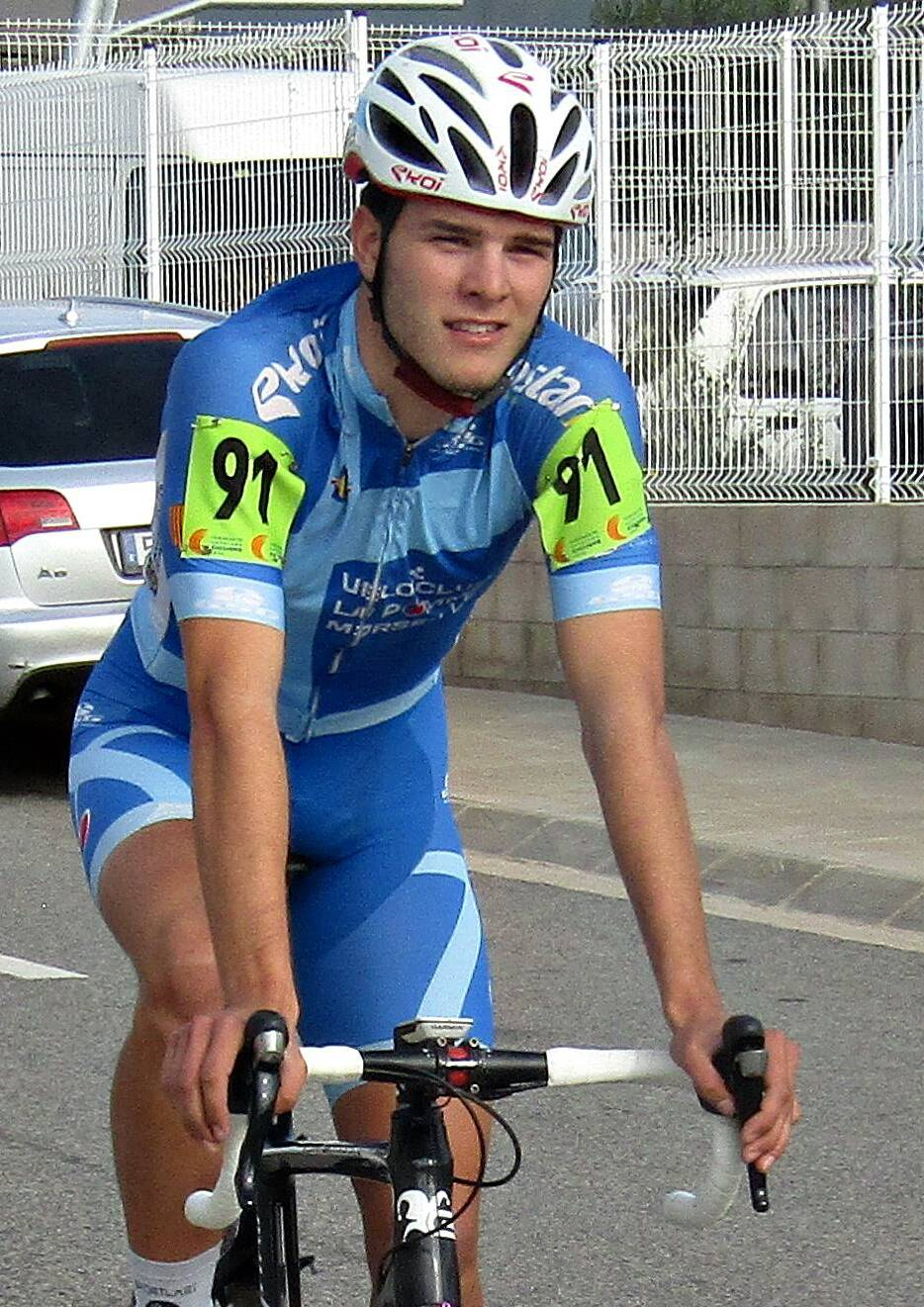
- Brustenga in 2018

Personal information
- Full name: Marc Brustenga Masagué
- Born: 4 September 1999 (age 27) Santa Eulàlia de Ronçana, Spain
- Height: 1.90 m (6 ft 3 in)
- Weight: 80 kg (176 lb)

Cycling career
- Sport: Cycling
- Current team: Equipo Kern Pharma
- Discipline: Road
- Role: Rider

Amateur teams
- 2018–2020: VC La Pomme Marseille
- 2021: Filial Caja Rural–Seguros RGA

Professional teams
- 2022–2023: Trek–Segafredo
- 2024–: Equipo Kern Pharma

Marc Brustenga Masagué (born 4 September 1999) is a Spanish cyclist, who currently rides for UCI ProTeam Equipo Kern Pharma.

== Major results ==
2017
1st Prologue Ain Bugey Valromey Tour
2021
1st Aiztondo Klasika
1st Essor Basque
1st Gran Premio Ciudad de Vigo
1st Zumaiako Saria
1st Stage 1 (ITT) Tour of Galicia
2024
10th Ronde van Limburg
2026 (1 pro win)
1st Classic Velox Adélie de Vitré
5th Gran Premio Primavera Ontur
8th Trofeo Palma
