= 2023 Vuelta a Burgos =

Men's road cycling stage race

2023 UCI ProSeries

Race details
- Dates: 15–19 August 2023
- Stages: 5
- Distance: 674.2 km (418.9 mi)
- Winning time: 16h 24' 49"

Results
Jersey awarded to the overall winner	Winner	Primož Roglič (SLO)	(Team Jumbo–Visma)
	Second	Aleksandr Vlasov	(Bora–Hansgrohe)
	Third	Adam Yates (GBR)	(UAE Team Emirates)
Jersey awarded to the points classification winner	Points	Primož Roglič (SLO)	(Team Jumbo–Visma)
Jersey awarded to the mountains classification winner	Mountains	Adam Yates (GBR)	(UAE Team Emirates)
Jersey awarded to the youth classification winner	Youth	Javier Romo (ESP)	(Astana Qazaqstan Team)
	Team	(United Arab Emirates) UAE Team Emirates XRG	

The 2023 Vuelta a Burgos was a men's road cycling stage race that took place from 15 to 19 August 2023 in the Spanish province of Burgos. It was the 45th edition of the Vuelta a Burgos, and was rated as a 2.Pro event as part of the 2023 UCI ProSeries calendar.

== Teams ==
Eight of the eighteen UCI WorldTeams were joined by six UCI ProTeams and a UCI Continental Team to make up the fifteen teams that participated in the race.

UCI WorldTeams

- AG2R Citroën Team
- Astana Qazaqstan Team
- Bora–Hansgrohe
- EF Education–EasyPost
- Movistar Team
- Team Bahrain Victorious
- Team Jumbo–Visma
- UAE Team Emirates

UCI ProTeams

- Burgos BH
- Caja Rural–Seguros RGA
- Eolo–Kometa
- Equipo Kern Pharma
- Euskaltel–Euskadi
- Q36.5 Pro Cycling Team

UCI Continental Teams

- Electro Hiper Europa

== Route ==
Stage characteristics and winners
Stage	Date	Course	Distance	Type	Stage winner
1	15 August	Villalba de Duero to Burgos	161 km (100 mi)	Flat stage	Juan Sebastián Molano (COL)
2	16 August	Oña to Poza de la Sal	13.1 km (8.1 mi)	Team time trial	Team Jumbo–Visma
3	17 August	Sargentes de la Lora to Villarcayo	183 km (114 mi)	Medium-mountain stage	Primož Roglič (SLO)
4	18 August	Santa Gadea del Cid to Pradoluengo	157 km (98 mi)	Hilly stage	Oier Lazkano (ESP)
5	19 August	Golmayo to Lagunas de Neila	160 km (99 mi)	Mountain stage	Primož Roglič (SLO)
Total			674.2 km (418.9 mi)		

== Stages ==
=== Stage 1 ===
15 August 2023 – Villalba de Duero to Burgos, 161 km (100 mi)

Stage 1 Result
Rank	Rider	Team	Time
1	Juan Sebastián Molano (COL)	UAE Team Emirates	3h 58' 58"
2	Iván García Cortina (ESP)	Movistar Team	+ 0"
3	Edoardo Affini (ITA)	Team Jumbo–Visma	+ 0"
4	Victor Koretzky (FRA)	Bora–Hansgrohe	+ 0"
5	Iúri Leitão (POR)	Caja Rural–Seguros RGA	+ 0"
6	Andrea Vendrame (ITA)	AG2R Citroën Team	+ 0"
7	Gianluca Brambilla (ITA)	Q36.5 Pro Cycling Team	+ 0"
8	Manuel Peñalver (ESP)	Burgos BH	+ 0"
9	Sean Quinn (USA)	EF Education–EasyPost	+ 0"
10	Aleksandr Vlasov	Bora–Hansgrohe	+ 0"

General classification after Stage 1
Rank	Rider	Team	Time
1	Juan Sebastián Molano (COL)	UAE Team Emirates	3h 58' 48"
2	Iván García Cortina (ESP)	Movistar Team	+ 4"
3	Edoardo Affini (ITA)	Team Jumbo–Visma	+ 6"
4	Xabier Berasategi (ESP)	Euskaltel–Euskadi	+ 8"
5	Mattia Bais (ITA)	Eolo–Kometa	+ 9"
6	Victor Koretzky (FRA)	Bora–Hansgrohe	+ 10"
7	Iúri Leitão (POR)	Caja Rural–Seguros RGA	+ 10"
8	Andrea Vendrame (ITA)	AG2R Citroën Team	+ 10"
9	Gianluca Brambilla (ITA)	Q36.5 Pro Cycling Team	+ 10"
10	Manuel Peñalver (ESP)	Burgos BH	+ 10"

=== Stage 2 ===
16 August 2023 – Oña to Poza de la Sal, 13.1 km (8.1 mi) (TTT)

Stage 2 Result
Rank	Team	Time
1	Team Jumbo–Visma	14' 38"
2	Movistar Team	+ 19"
3	Bora–Hansgrohe	+ 30"
4	Team Bahrain Victorious	+ 31"
5	UAE Team Emirates	+ 34"
6	EF Education–EasyPost	+ 42"
7	Equipo Kern Pharma	+ 47"
8	Astana Qazaqstan Team	+ 52"
9	Q36.5 Pro Cycling Team	+ 53"
10	Burgos BH	+ 55"

General classification after Stage 2
Rank	Rider	Team	Time
1	Attila Valter (HUN)	Team Jumbo–Visma	3h 53' 36"
2	Jan Tratnik (SLO)	Team Jumbo–Visma	+ 0"
3	Koen Bouwman (NED)	Team Jumbo–Visma	+ 0"
4	Primož Roglič (SLO)	Team Jumbo–Visma	+ 0"
5	Iván García Cortina (ESP)	Movistar Team	+ 13"
6	Oier Lazkano (ESP)	Movistar Team	+ 19"
7	Einer Rubio (ESP)	Movistar Team	+ 19"
8	Carlos Verona (ESP)	Movistar Team	+ 19"
9	Aleksandr Vlasov	Bora–Hansgrohe	+ 30"
10	Florian Lipowitz (GER)	Bora–Hansgrohe	+ 30"

=== Stage 3 ===
17 August 2023 – Sargentes de la Lora to Villarcayo, 183 km (114 mi)

Stage 3 Result
Rank	Rider	Team	Time
1	Primož Roglič (SLO)	Team Jumbo–Visma	4h 26' 00"
2	Aleksandr Vlasov	Bora–Hansgrohe	+ 0"
3	Adam Yates (GBR)	UAE Team Emirates	+ 0"
4	Damien Howson (AUS)	Q36.5 Pro Cycling Team	+ 0"
5	Javier Romo (ESP)	Astana Qazaqstan Team	+ 1' 07"
6	George Bennett (AUS)	UAE Team Emirates	+ 1' 07"
7	Einer Rubio (COL)	Movistar Team	+ 1' 07"
8	Nicolas Prodhomme (FRA)	AG2R Citroën Team	+ 3' 17"
9	Pablo Castrillo (ESP)	Equipo Kern Pharma	+ 3' 17"
10	Sean Quinn (USA)	EF Education–EasyPost	+ 3' 51"

General classification after Stage 3
Rank	Rider	Team	Time
1	Primož Roglič (SLO)	Team Jumbo–Visma	8h 19' 25"
2	Aleksandr Vlasov	Bora–Hansgrohe	+ 33"
3	Adam Yates (GBR)	UAE Team Emirates	+ 38"
4	Damien Howson (AUS)	Q36.5 Pro Cycling Team	+ + 1' 04"
5	Einer Rubio (COL)	Movistar Team	+ 1' 37"
6	George Bennett (AUS)	UAE Team Emirates	+ 1' 52"
7	Javier Romo (ESP)	Astana Qazaqstan Team	+ 2' 10"
8	Jan Tratnik (SLO)	Team Jumbo–Visma	+ 4' 02"
9	Pablo Castrillo (ESP)	Equipo Kern Pharma	+ 4' 15"
10	Carlos Verona (ESP)	Movistar Team	+ 4' 21"

=== Stage 4 ===
18 August 2023 – Santa Gadea del Cid to Pradoluengo, 157 km (98 mi)

Stage 4 Result
Rank	Rider	Team	Time
1	Oier Lazkano (ESP)	Movistar Team	3h 56' 56"
2	Santiago Buitrago (COL)	Team Bahrain Victorious	+ 0"
3	Raúl García Pierna (ESP)	Equipo Kern Pharma	+ 3"
4	Jonathan Klever Caicedo (ECU)	EF Education–EasyPost	+ 3"
5	Gianluca Brambilla (ITA)	Q36.5 Pro Cycling Team	+ 3"
6	Harold Martín López (ECU)	Astana Qazaqstan Team	+ 3"
7	Matteo Fabbro (ITA)	Bora–Hansgrohe	+ 5"
8	Joan Bou (ESP)	Euskaltel–Euskadi	+ 5"
9	Jay Vine (AUS)	UAE Team Emirates	+ 5"
10	Iván García Cortina (ESP)	Movistar Team	+ 58"

General classification after Stage 4
Rank	Rider	Team	Time
1	Primož Roglič (SLO)	Team Jumbo–Visma	12h 16' 28"
2	Aleksandr Vlasov	Bora–Hansgrohe	+ 33"
3	Adam Yates (GBR)	UAE Team Emirates	+ 38"
4	Damien Howson (AUS)	Q36.5 Pro Cycling Team	+ + 1' 04"
5	George Bennett (AUS)	UAE Team Emirates	+ 1' 52"
6	Javier Romo (ESP)	Astana Qazaqstan Team	+ 2' 10"
7	Einer Rubio (COL)	Movistar Team	+ 2' 27"
8	Raúl García Pierna (ESP)	Equipo Kern Pharma	+ 3' 50"
9	Jay Vine (AUS)	UAE Team Emirates	+ 3' 53"
10	Harold Martín López (ECU)	Astana Qazaqstan Team	+ 3' 57"

=== Stage 5 ===
19 August 2023 – Golmayo to Lagunas de Neila, 160 km (99 mi)

Stage 5 Result
Rank	Rider	Team	Time
1	Primož Roglič (SLO)	Team Jumbo–Visma	4h 08' 31"
2	Adam Yates (GBR)	UAE Team Emirates	+ 0"
3	Aleksandr Vlasov	Bora–Hansgrohe	+ 0"
4	Jay Vine (AUS)	UAE Team Emirates	+ 30"
5	Einer Rubio (COL)	Movistar Team	+ 48"
6	Santiago Buitrago (COL)	Team Bahrain Victorious	+ 48"
7	Damien Howson (AUS)	Q36.5 Pro Cycling Team	+ 53"
8	Attila Valter (HUN)	Team Jumbo–Visma	+ 1' 03"
9	Jonathan Klever Caicedo (ECU)	EF Education–EasyPost	+ 1' 03"
10	Damiano Caruso (ITA)	Team Bahrain Victorious	+ 1' 03"

General classification after Stage 5
Rank	Rider	Team	Time
1	Primož Roglič (SLO)	Team Jumbo–Visma	16h 24' 49"
2	Aleksandr Vlasov	Bora–Hansgrohe	+ 39"
3	Adam Yates (GBR)	UAE Team Emirates	+ 42"
4	Damien Howson (AUS)	Q36.5 Pro Cycling Team	+ + 2' 07"
5	Einer Rubio (COL)	Movistar Team	+ 3' 25"
6	George Bennett (AUS)	UAE Team Emirates	+ 3' 39"
7	Javier Romo (ESP)	Astana Qazaqstan Team	+ 3' 42"
8	Jay Vine (AUS)	UAE Team Emirates	+ 4' 33"
9	Harold Martín López (ECU)	Astana Qazaqstan Team	+ 5' 23"
10	Joan Bou (ESP)	Euskaltel–Euskadi	+ 5' 27"

== Classification leadership table ==
Classification leadership by stage
Stage	Winner	General classification	Points classification	Mountains classification	Young rider classification	Team classification
1	Juan Sebastián Molano	Juan Sebastián Molano	Juan Sebastián Molano	Xabier Berasategi	Sean Quinn	Bora–Hansgrohe
2	Team Jumbo–Visma	Attila Valter	Juan Sebastián Molano	Xabier Berasategi	Oier Lazkano	Team Jumbo–Visma
3	Primož Roglič	Primož Roglič	Aleksandr Vlasov	Adam Yates	Javier Romo	UAE Team Emirates
4	Oier Lazkano	Primož Roglič	Aleksandr Vlasov	Adam Yates	Javier Romo	UAE Team Emirates
5	Primož Roglič	Primož Roglič	Primož Roglič	Adam Yates	Javier Romo	UAE Team Emirates
Final		Primož Roglič	Primož Roglič	Adam Yates	Javier Romo	UAE Team Emirates

== Final classification standings ==
Legend
Denotes the winner of the general classification	Denotes the winner of the mountains classification
Denotes the winner of the points classification	Denotes the winner of the young rider classification

=== General classification ===
Final general classification (1–10)
Rank	Rider	Team	Time
1	Primož Roglič (SLO)	Team Jumbo–Visma	16h 24' 49"
2	Aleksandr Vlasov	Bora–Hansgrohe	+ 39"
3	Adam Yates (GBR)	UAE Team Emirates	+ 42"
4	Damien Howson (AUS)	Q36.5 Pro Cycling Team	+ 2' 07"
5	Einer Rubio (COL)	Movistar Team	+ 3' 25"
6	George Bennett (NZL)	UAE Team Emirates	+ 3' 39"
7	Javier Romo (ESP)	Astana Qazaqstan Team	+ 3' 42"
8	Jay Vine (AUS)	UAE Team Emirates	+ 4' 33"
9	Harold Martín López (ECU)	Astana Qazaqstan Team	+ 5' 23"
10	Joan Bou (ESP)	Euskaltel–Euskadi	+ 5' 27"

=== Points classification ===
Final points classification (1–10)
Rank	Rider	Team	Time
1	Primož Roglič (SLO)	Team Jumbo–Visma	50
2	Aleksandr Vlasov	Bora–Hansgrohe	47
3	Adam Yates (GBR)	UAE Team Emirates	40
4	Santiago Buitrago (COL)	Team Bahrain Victorious	30
5	Oier Lazkano (ESP)	Movistar Team	27
6	Iván García Cortina (ESP)	Movistar Team	26
7	Juan Sebastián Molano (COL)	UAE Team Emirates	25
8	Damien Howson (AUS)	Q36.5 Pro Cycling Team	23
9	Einer Rubio (COL)	Movistar Team	21
10	Jay Vine (AUS)	UAE Team Emirates	21

=== Mountains classification ===
Final mountains classification (1–10)
Rank	Rider	Team	Time
1	Adam Yates (GBR)	UAE Team Emirates	61
2	Primož Roglič (SLO)	Team Jumbo–Visma	57
3	Aleksandr Vlasov	Bora–Hansgrohe	40
4	Jay Vine (AUS)	UAE Team Emirates	37
5	Xabier Berasategi (ESP)	Euskaltel–Euskadi	30
6	Damien Howson (AUS)	Q36.5 Pro Cycling Team	29
7	Matteo Fabbro (ITA)	Bora–Hansgrohe	26
8	Einer Rubio (COL)	Movistar Team	18
9	Santiago Buitrago (COL)	Team Bahrain Victorious	17
10	Mattia Bais (ITA)	Eolo–Kometa	17

=== Young rider classification ===
Final young rider classification (1–10)
Rank	Rider	Team	Time
1	Javier Romo (ESP)	Astana Qazaqstan Team	16h 28' 31"
2	Harold Martín López (ECU)	Astana Qazaqstan Team	+ 1' 41"
3	Pablo Castrillo (ESP)	Equipo Kern Pharma	+ 2' 20"
4	Raúl García Pierna (ESP)	Equipo Kern Pharma	+ 2' 24"
5	Sean Quinn (USA)	EF Education–EasyPost	+ 3' 20"
6	Mark Donovan (GBR)	Q36.5 Pro Cycling Team	+ 3' 46"
7	Mulu Hailemichael (ETH)	Caja Rural–Seguros RGA	+ 4' 35"
8	Santiago Buitrago (COL)	Team Bahrain Victorious	+ 9' 15"
9	Oier Lazkano (ESP)	Movistar Team	+ 12' 35"
10	Carlos Canal (ESP)	Euskaltel–Euskadi	+ 13' 05"

=== Team classification ===
Final team classification (1–10)
Rank	Team	Time
1	(United Arab Emirates) UAE Team Emirates	48h 53' 10"
2	(Netherlands) Team Jumbo–Visma	+ 5' 17"
3	(Spain) Equipo Kern Pharma	+ 9' 25"
4	(Spain) Movistar Team	+ 12' 09"
5	(Switzerland) Q36.5 Pro Cycling Team	+ 13' 28"
6	(Kazakhstan) Astana Qazaqstan Team	+ 16' 12"
7	(United States) EF Education–EasyPost	+ 17' 12"
8	Team Bahrain Victorious	+ 18' 23"
9	(Spain) Euskaltel–Euskadi	+ 20' 23"
10	(France) AG2R Citroën Team	+ 22' 02"
