= 2021 Route d'Occitanie =

2021 UCI Europe Tour

Race details
- Dates: 10–13 June 2021
- Stages: 4
- Distance: 697.7 km (433.5 mi)
- Winning time: 18h 07' 15"

Results
Jersey awarded to the overall winner	Winner	Antonio Pedrero (ESP)	(Movistar Team)
	Second	Jesús Herrada (ESP)	(Cofidis)
	Third	Óscar Rodríguez (ESP)	(Astana–Premier Tech)
Jersey awarded to the points classification winner	Points	Andrea Vendrame (ITA)	(AG2R Citroën Team)
Jersey awarded to the mountains classification winner	Mountains	Álvaro Cuadros (ESP)	(Caja Rural–Seguros RGA)
Jersey awarded to the young rider classification winner	Young rider	Simon Carr (GBR)	(EF Education–Nippo)
	Team	Astana–Premier Tech	

The 2021 Route d'Occitanie (known as the La Route d'Occitanie - La Dépêche du Midi for sponsorship reasons) was a road cycling stage race that took place between 10 and 13 June 2021 in the southern French region of Occitanie. The race was the 45th edition of the Route d'Occitanie and was rated as a category 2.1 event on the 2021 UCI Europe Tour.

== Teams ==
Eight of the nineteen UCI WorldTeams, eight UCI ProTeams, three UCI Continental teams, and the French national team made up the twenty-teams that participated in the race. Only three teams did not enter a full squad of seven riders: INEOS Grenadiers and Trek–Segafredo entered five riders each, while Cofidis entered six riders. Of the 135 riders who started the race, 107 finished.

UCI WorldTeams

- AG2R Citroën Team
- Astana–Premier Tech
- Cofidis
- EF Education–Nippo
- Groupama–FDJ
- INEOS Grenadiers
- Movistar Team
- Trek–Segafredo

UCI ProTeams

- Arkéa–Samsic
- B&B Hotels p/b KTM
- Burgos BH
- Caja Rural–Seguros RGA
- Delko
- Equipo Kern Pharma
- Euskaltel–Euskadi
- Total Direct Énergie

UCI Continental Teams

- Bike Aid
- St. Michel–Auber93
- Xelliss–Roubaix–Lille Métropole

National Teams

- France

== Route ==
Stage characteristics and winners
Stage	Date	Course	Distance	Type	Stage winner
1	10 June	Cazouls-lès-Béziers to Lacaune-les-Bains	156 km (97 mi)	Hilly stage	Andrea Vendrame (ITA)
2	11 June	Villefranche-de-Rouergue to Auch	198.7 km (123.5 mi)	Flat stage	Arnaud Démare (FRA)
3	12 June	Pierrefitte-Nestalas to Le Mourtis	191.8 km (119.2 mi)	Mountain stage	Antonio Pedrero (ESP)
4	13 June	Lavelanet–Pays d'Olmes to Duilhac-sous-Peyrepertuse	151.2 km (94.0 mi)	Mountain stage	Magnus Cort (DEN)
Total			697.7 km (433.5 mi)		

== Stages ==
=== Stage 1 ===
10 June 2021 – Cazouls-lès-Béziers to Lacaune-les-Bains, 156 km (97 mi)

Stage 1 Result
Rank	Rider	Team	Time
1	Andrea Vendrame (ITA)	AG2R Citroën Team	3h 59' 41"
2	Magnus Cort (DEN)	EF Education–Nippo	+ 4"
3	Jacopo Mosca (ITA)	Trek–Segafredo	+ 4"
4	Luis León Sánchez (ESP)	Astana–Premier Tech	+ 4"
5	Jesús Herrada (ESP)	Cofidis	+ 4"
6	Ben Swift (GBR)	INEOS Grenadiers	+ 4"
7	Tony Gallopin (FRA)	AG2R Citroën Team	+ 4"
8	Romain Hardy (FRA)	Arkéa–Samsic	+ 4"
9	Diego López (ESP)	Equipo Kern Pharma	+ 4"
10	Jhojan García (COL)	Caja Rural–Seguros RGA	+ 4"

General classification after Stage 1
Rank	Rider	Team	Time
1	Andrea Vendrame (ITA)	AG2R Citroën Team	3h 59' 31"
2	Magnus Cort (DEN)	EF Education–Nippo	+ 8"
3	Jacopo Mosca (ITA)	Trek–Segafredo	+ 10"
4	Jon Agirre (ESP)	Equipo Kern Pharma	+ 12"
5	José Manuel Díaz (ESP)	Delko	+ 13"
6	Luis León Sánchez (ESP)	Astana–Premier Tech	+ 14"
7	Jesús Herrada (ESP)	Cofidis	+ 14"
8	Ben Swift (GBR)	INEOS Grenadiers	+ 14"
9	Tony Gallopin (FRA)	AG2R Citroën Team	+ 14"
10	Romain Hardy (FRA)	Arkéa–Samsic	+ 14"

=== Stage 2 ===
11 June 2021 – Villefranche-de-Rouergue to Auch, 198.7 km (123.5 mi)

Stage 2 Result
Rank	Rider	Team	Time
1	Arnaud Démare (FRA)	Groupama–FDJ	5h 01' 31"
2	Orluis Aular (VEN)	Caja Rural–Seguros RGA	+ 0"
3	Jacopo Mosca (ITA)	Trek–Segafredo	+ 0"
4	Lorrenzo Manzin (FRA)	Total Direct Énergie	+ 0"
5	David González (ESP)	Caja Rural–Seguros RGA	+ 0"
6	Romain Hardy (FRA)	Arkéa–Samsic	+ 0"
7	Thomas Boudat (FRA)	Arkéa–Samsic	+ 0"
8	Andrea Vendrame (ITA)	AG2R Citroën Team	+ 0"
9	Emiel Vermeulen (BEL)	Xelliss–Roubaix–Lille Métropole	+ 0"
10	Lluís Mas (ESP)	Movistar Team	+ 0"

General classification after Stage 2
Rank	Rider	Team	Time
1	Andrea Vendrame (ITA)	AG2R Citroën Team	9h 01' 02"
2	Jacopo Mosca (ITA)	Trek–Segafredo	+ 6"
3	Magnus Cort (DEN)	EF Education–Nippo	+ 8"
4	Jon Agirre (ESP)	Equipo Kern Pharma	+ 12"
5	José Manuel Díaz (ESP)	Delko	+ 13"
6	Romain Hardy (FRA)	Arkéa–Samsic	+ 14"
7	Ben Swift (GBR)	INEOS Grenadiers	+ 14"
8	Jesús Herrada (ESP)	Cofidis	+ 14"
9	Luis León Sánchez (ESP)	Astana–Premier Tech	+ 14"
10	Roger Adrià (ESP)	Equipo Kern Pharma	+ 14"

=== Stage 3 ===
12 June 2021 – Pierrefitte-Nestalas to Le Mourtis, 191.8 km (119.2 mi)

Stage 3 Result
Rank	Rider	Team	Time
1	Antonio Pedrero (ESP)	Movistar Team	5h 22' 05"
2	Jesús Herrada (ESP)	Cofidis	+ 40"
3	Óscar Rodríguez (ESP)	Astana–Premier Tech	+ 43"
4	Cristián Rodríguez (ESP)	Total Direct Énergie	+ 46"
5	Simon Carr (GBR)	EF Education–Nippo	+ 46"
6	Giulio Ciccone (ITA)	Trek–Segafredo	+ 46"
7	Merhawi Kudus (ERI)	Astana–Premier Tech	+ 1' 18"
8	Élie Gesbert (FRA)	Arkéa–Samsic	+ 1' 21"
9	Mikel Bizkarra (ESP)	Euskaltel–Euskadi	+ 1' 23"
10	Julen Amezqueta (ESP)	Caja Rural–Seguros RGA	+ 1' 26"

General classification after Stage 3
Rank	Rider	Team	Time
1	Antonio Pedrero (ESP)	Movistar Team	14h 23' 11"
2	Jesús Herrada (ESP)	Cofidis	+ 44"
3	Óscar Rodríguez (ESP)	Astana–Premier Tech	+ 49"
4	Giulio Ciccone (ITA)	Trek–Segafredo	+ 56"
5	Cristián Rodríguez (ESP)	Total Direct Énergie	+ 56"
6	Simon Carr (GBR)	EF Education–Nippo	+ 1' 19"
7	Merhawi Kudus (ERI)	Astana–Premier Tech	+ 1' 28"
8	Élie Gesbert (FRA)	Arkéa–Samsic	+ 1' 31"
9	Mikel Bizkarra (ESP)	Euskaltel–Euskadi	+ 1' 33"
10	Julen Amezqueta (ESP)	Caja Rural–Seguros RGA	+ 1' 36"

=== Stage 4 ===
13 June 2021 – Lavelanet–Pays d'Olmes to Duilhac-sous-Peyrepertuse, 151.2 km (94.0 mi)

Stage 4 Result
Rank	Rider	Team	Time
1	Magnus Cort (DEN)	EF Education–Nippo	3h 42' 54"
2	Gianluca Brambilla (ITA)	Trek–Segafredo	+ 18"
3	Tony Gallopin (FRA)	AG2R Citroën Team	+ 34"
4	Jesús Herrada (ESP)	Cofidis	+ 52"
5	Óscar Rodríguez (ESP)	Astana–Premier Tech	+ 56"
6	Clément Champoussin (FRA)	AG2R Citroën Team	+ 58"
7	Cristián Rodríguez (ESP)	Total Direct Énergie	+ 58"
8	Julen Amezqueta (ESP)	Caja Rural–Seguros RGA	+ 1' 04"
9	Élie Gesbert (FRA)	Arkéa–Samsic	+ 1' 08"
10	Antonio Pedrero (ESP)	Movistar Team	+ 1' 11"

General classification after Stage 4
Rank	Rider	Team	Time
1	Antonio Pedrero (ESP)	Movistar Team	18h 07' 16"
2	Jesús Herrada (ESP)	Cofidis	+ 25"
3	Óscar Rodríguez (ESP)	Astana–Premier Tech	+ 34"
4	Cristián Rodríguez (ESP)	Total Direct Énergie	+ 43"
5	Giulio Ciccone (ITA)	Trek–Segafredo	+ 58"
6	Élie Gesbert (FRA)	Arkéa–Samsic	+ 1' 28"
7	Julen Amezqueta (ESP)	Caja Rural–Seguros RGA	+ 1' 29"
8	Merhawi Kudus (ERI)	Astana–Premier Tech	+ 1' 31"
9	Simon Carr (GBR)	EF Education–Nippo	+ 1' 30"
10	Mikel Bizkarra (ESP)	Euskaltel–Euskadi	+ 1' 44"

== Classification leadership table ==
Classification leadership by stage
Stage	Winner	General classification	Points classification	Mountains classification	Young rider classification	Team classification	Combativity award
1	Andrea Vendrame	Andrea Vendrame	Andrea Vendrame	Álvaro Cuadros	Jon Agirre	AG2R Citroën Team	Juri Hollmann
2	Arnaud Démare	Andrea Vendrame	Jacopo Mosca	Álvaro Cuadros	Jon Agirre	AG2R Citroën Team	Adne van Engelen
3	Antonio Pedrero	Antonio Pedrero	Jacopo Mosca	Álvaro Cuadros	Simon Carr	Astana–Premier Tech	Jokin Murguialday
4	Magnus Cort	Antonio Pedrero	Andrea Vendrame	Álvaro Cuadros	Simon Carr	Astana–Premier Tech	Jérémy Cabot
Final		Antonio Pedrero	Andrea Vendrame	Álvaro Cuadros	Simon Carr	Astana–Premier Tech	Not awarded

- On stage 2, Magnus Cort, who was second in the points classification, wore the green jersey, because first placed Andrea Vendrame wore the orange jersey as the leader of the general classification.

== Final classification standings ==
Legend
Denotes the winner of the general classification	Denotes the winner of the mountains classification
Denotes the winner of the points classification	Denotes the winner of the young rider classification

=== General classification ===
Final general classification (1–10)
Rank	Rider	Team	Time
1	Antonio Pedrero (ESP)	Movistar Team	18h 07' 16"
2	Jesús Herrada (ESP)	Cofidis	+ 25"
3	Óscar Rodríguez (ESP)	Astana–Premier Tech	+ 34"
4	Cristián Rodríguez (ESP)	Total Direct Énergie	+ 43"
5	Giulio Ciccone (ITA)	Trek–Segafredo	+ 58"
6	Élie Gesbert (FRA)	Arkéa–Samsic	+ 1' 28"
7	Julen Amezqueta (ESP)	Caja Rural–Seguros RGA	+ 1' 29"
8	Merhawi Kudus (ERI)	Astana–Premier Tech	+ 1' 31"
9	Simon Carr (GBR)	EF Education–Nippo	+ 1' 30"
10	Mikel Bizkarra (ESP)	Euskaltel–Euskadi	+ 1' 44"

=== Points classification ===
Final points classification (1–10)
Rank	Rider	Team	Points
1	Andrea Vendrame (ITA)	AG2R Citroën Team	34
2	Magnus Cort (DEN)	EF Education–Nippo	32
3	Jesús Herrada (ESP)	Cofidis	32
4	Jacopo Mosca (ITA)	Trek–Segafredo	30
5	Arnaud Démare (FRA)	Groupama–FDJ	20
6	Tony Gallopin (FRA)	AG2R Citroën Team	20
7	Romain Hardy (FRA)	Arkéa–Samsic	18
8	Óscar Rodríguez (ESP)	Astana–Premier Tech	17
9	Antonio Pedrero (ESP)	Movistar Team	16
10	Gianluca Brambilla (ITA)	Trek–Segafredo	13

=== Mountains classification ===
Final mountains classification (1–10)
Rank	Rider	Team	Points
1	Álvaro Cuadros (ESP)	Caja Rural–Seguros RGA	40
2	Tony Gallopin (FRA)	AG2R Citroën Team	16
3	Daniel Navarro (ESP)	Burgos BH	16
4	Gianluca Brambilla (ITA)	Trek–Segafredo	14
5	Mikel Iturria (ESP)	Euskaltel–Euskadi	14
6	Juri Hollmann (GER)	Movistar Team	14
7	Magnus Cort (DEN)	EF Education–Nippo	13
8	Jesús Herrada (ESP)	Cofidis	12
9	Antonio Pedrero (ESP)	Movistar Team	10
10	Ángel Madrazo (ESP)	Burgos BH	9

=== Young rider classification ===
Final young rider classification (1–10)
Rank	Rider	Team	Time
1	Simon Carr (GBR)	EF Education–Nippo	18h 08' 47"
2	José Félix Parra (ESP)	Equipo Kern Pharma	+ 45"
3	Joan Bou (ESP)	Euskaltel–Euskadi	+ 54"
4	Clément Berthet (FRA)	Delko	+ 1' 06"
5	Roger Adrià (ESP)	Equipo Kern Pharma	+ 1' 46"
6	Jon Agirre (ESP)	Equipo Kern Pharma	+ 2' 29"
7	Hugo Toumire (FRA)	France	+ 2' 33"
8	Clément Champoussin (FRA)	AG2R Citroën Team	+ 3' 03"
9	Jhojan García (COL)	Caja Rural–Seguros RGA	+ 3' 17"
10	Yuriy Natarov (KAZ)	Astana–Premier Tech	+ 5' 17"

=== Team classification ===
Final team classification (1–10)
Rank	Team	Time
1	Astana–Premier Tech	54h 30' 44"
2	Equipo Kern Pharma	+ 39"
3	Trek–Segafredo	+ 1' 54"
4	Euskaltel–Euskadi	+ 7' 09"
5	Arkéa–Samsic	+ 12' 01"
6	Movistar Team	+ 12' 57"
7	Caja Rural–Seguros RGA	+ 13' 17"
8	AG2R Citroën Team	+ 15' 10"
9	Delko	+ 21' 37"
10	EF Education–Nippo	+ 31' 54"
