= 2025 Volta a la Comunitat Valenciana =

2025 UCI ProSeries

Race details
- Dates: 5–9 February 2025
- Stages: 5
- Distance: 665.8 km (413.7 mi)
- Winning time: 16h 17' 43"

Results
Jersey awarded to the overall winner	Winner	Santiago Buitrago (COL)	(Team Bahrain Victorious)
	Second	João Almeida (POR)	(UAE Team Emirates XRG)
	Third	Pello Bilbao (ESP)	(Team Bahrain Victorious)
Jersey awarded to the points classification winner	Points	Santiago Buitrago (COL)	(Team Bahrain Victorious)
Jersey awarded to the mountains classification winner	Mountains	Jon Agirre (ESP)	(Euskaltel–Euskadi)
Jersey awarded to the young rider classification winner	Young rider	Carlos Rodríguez (ESP)	(INEOS Grenadiers)
	Team	Team Bahrain Victorious	

The 2025 Volta a la Comunitat Valenciana was a road cycling stage race, the 76th edition of the Volta a la Comunitat Valenciana, and part of the 2025 UCI ProSeries. It began on the 5th of February in Orihuela and finished on the 9th in Valencia.

== Teams ==
Nine UCI WorldTeams, ten UCI ProTeams and three UCI Continental Teams make up the twenty-two teams that will take part in the race.

UCI WorldTeams

- Alpecin–Deceuninck
- INEOS Grenadiers
- Intermarché–Wanty
- Lidl–Trek
- Movistar Team
- Red Bull–Bora–Hansgrohe
- Team Bahrain Victorious
- Team Jayco–AlUla
- UAE Team Emirates XRG

UCI ProTeams

- Burgos Burpellet BH
- Caja Rural–Seguros RGA
- Equipo Kern Pharma
- Euskaltel–Euskadi
- Israel–Premier Tech
- Q36.5 Pro Cycling Team
- Team Novo Nordisk
- Team Polti VisitMalta
- VF Group–Bardiani–CSF–Faizanè
- Wagner Bazin WB

UCI Continental Teams

- Illes Balears Arabay
- Petrolike
- Project Echelon Racing

== Route ==
Stage characteristics and winners
Stage	Date	Course	Distance	Type	Stage winner
1	5 February	Orihuela to Orihuela	34.3 km (21.3 mi)	Team time trial	Lidl–Trek (USA)
2	6 February	La Nucia to Benifato	166 km (103 mi)	Mountain stage	Santiago Buitrago (COL)
3	7 February	Algemesí to Alpuente	180.3 km (112.0 mi)	Mountain stage	Iván Romeo (ESP)
4	8 February	Oropesa del Mar to Portell de Morella	181 km (112 mi)	Hilly stage	Santiago Buitrago (COL)
5	9 February	Alfafar to Valencia	104.2 km (64.7 mi)	Flat stage	Jonathan Milan (ITA)
Total			665.8 km (413.7 mi)		

== Stages ==
=== Stage 1 ===
5 February — Orihuela to Orihuela, 34.3 km (21.3 mi) (TTT)

Stage 1 Result
Rank	Team	Time
1	(United States) Lidl–Trek	39' 19"
2	(Australia) Team Jayco–AlUla	+ 46"
3	(United Arab Emirates) UAE Team Emirates XRG	+ 50"
4	(Germany) Red Bull–Bora–Hansgrohe	+ 50"
5	(United Kingdom) INEOS Grenadiers	+ 51"
6	(Spain) Movistar Team	+ 1' 05"
7	Team Bahrain Victorious	+ 1' 11"
8	Israel–Premier Tech	+ 1' 21"
9	(Switzerland) Q36.5 Pro Cycling Team	+ 1' 50"
10	(Belgium) Alpecin–Deceuninck	+ 2' 06"

General classification after Stage 1
Rank	Rider	Team	Time
1	Mathias Vacek (CZE)	Lidl–Trek	39' 19"
2	Jonathan Milan (ITA)	Lidl–Trek	+ 0"
3	Daan Hoole (NED)	Lidl–Trek	+ 0"
4	Jakob Söderqvist (SWE)	Lidl–Trek	+ 0"
5	Edward Theuns (BEL)	Lidl–Trek	+ 30"
6	Jelte Krijnsen (NED)	Team Jayco–AlUla	+ 47"
7	Ben O'Connor (AUS)	Team Jayco–AlUla	+ 47"
8	Michael Hepburn (AUS)	Team Jayco–AlUla	+ 47"
9	Jasha Sütterlin (GER)	Team Jayco–AlUla	+ 47"
10	João Almeida (POR)	UAE Team Emirates XRG	+ 50"

=== Stage 2 ===
6 February — La Nucia to Benifato, 166 km (103 mi)

Stage 2 Result
Rank	Rider	Team	Time
1	Santiago Buitrago (COL)	Team Bahrain Victorious	4h 07' 54"
2	Pello Bilbao (ESP)	Team Bahrain Victorious	+ 9"
3	João Almeida (POR)	UAE Team Emirates XRG	+ 13"
4	Jefferson Alveiro Cepeda (ECU)	Movistar Team	+ 21"
5	Thymen Arensman (NED)	INEOS Grenadiers	+ 24"
6	Iván Sosa (COL)	Equipo Kern Pharma	+ 25"
7	Brandon McNulty (USA)	UAE Team Emirates XRG	+ 34"
8	Carlos Rodríguez (ESP)	INEOS Grenadiers	+ 34"
9	Lenny Martinez (FRA)	Team Bahrain Victorious	+ 39"
10	Iván Romeo (ESP)	Movistar Team	+ 39"

General classification after Stage 2
Rank	Rider	Team	Time
1	Mathias Vacek (CZE)	Lidl–Trek	4h 48' 10"
2	João Almeida (POR)	UAE Team Emirates XRG	+ 2"
3	Santiago Buitrago (COL)	Team Bahrain Victorious	+ 5"
4	Pello Bilbao (ESP)	Team Bahrain Victorious	+ 18"
5	Thymen Arensman (NED)	INEOS Grenadiers	+ 19"
6	Brandon McNulty (USA)	UAE Team Emirates XRG	+ 27"
7	Carlos Rodríguez (ESP)	INEOS Grenadiers	+ 29"
8	Jefferson Alveiro Cepeda (ECU)	Movistar Team	+ 30"
9	Iván Romeo (ESP)	Movistar Team	+ 48"
10	Lenny Martinez (FRA)	Team Bahrain Victorious	+ 54"

=== Stage 3 ===
7 February — Algemesí to Alpuente, 180.3 km (112.0 mi)

Stage 3 Result
Rank	Rider	Team	Time
1	Iván Romeo (ESP)	Movistar Team	4h 26' 15"
2	Santiago Buitrago (COL)	Team Bahrain Victorious	+ 10"
3	João Almeida (POR)	UAE Team Emirates XRG	+ 10"
4	Pello Bilbao (ESP)	Team Bahrain Victorious	+ 10"
5	Jefferson Alveiro Cepeda (ECU)	Movistar Team	+ 10"
6	Pablo Castrillo (ESP)	Movistar Team	+ 10"
7	Davide Piganzoli (ITA)	Team Polti VisitMalta	+ 10"
8	Jai Hindley (AUS)	Red Bull–Bora–Hansgrohe	+ 10"
9	Ben O'Connor (AUS)	Team Jayco–AlUla	+ 10"
10	Thymen Arensman (NED)	INEOS Grenadiers	+ 10"

General classification after Stage 3
Rank	Rider	Team	Time
1	João Almeida (POR)	UAE Team Emirates XRG	9h 14' 30"
2	Santiago Buitrago (COL)	Team Bahrain Victorious	+ 2"
3	Pello Bilbao (ESP)	Team Bahrain Victorious	+ 21"
4	Thymen Arensman (NED)	INEOS Grenadiers	+ 24"
5	Brandon McNulty (USA)	UAE Team Emirates XRG	+ 32"
6	Iván Romeo (ESP)	Movistar Team	+ 33"
7	Carlos Rodríguez (ESP)	INEOS Grenadiers	+ 33"
8	Jefferson Alveiro Cepeda (ECU)	Movistar Team	+ 35"
9	Pablo Castrillo (ESP)	Movistar Team	+ 1' 03"
10	Ben O'Connor (AUS)	Team Jayco–AlUla	+ 1' 05"

=== Stage 4 ===
8 February — Oropesa del Mar to Portell de Morella, 181 km (112 mi)

Stage 4 Result
Rank	Rider	Team	Time
1	Santiago Buitrago (COL)	Team Bahrain Victorious	4h 53' 29"
2	Jonathan Milan (ITA)	Lidl–Trek	+ 6"
3	Jakob Söderqvist (SWE)	Lidl–Trek	+ 6"
4	Riley Sheehan (USA)	Israel–Premier Tech	+ 10"
5	Thymen Arensman (NED)	INEOS Grenadiers	+ 10"
6	Pello Bilbao (ESP)	Team Bahrain Victorious	+ 10"
7	João Almeida (POR)	UAE Team Emirates XRG	+ 10"
8	Matteo Sobrero (ITA)	Red Bull–Bora–Hansgrohe	+ 10"
9	Brandon McNulty (USA)	UAE Team Emirates XRG	+ 13"
10	Jai Hindley (AUS)	Red Bull–Bora–Hansgrohe	+ 13"

General classification after Stage 4
Rank	Rider	Team	Time
1	Santiago Buitrago (COL)	Team Bahrain Victorious	14h 07' 51"
2	João Almeida (POR)	UAE Team Emirates XRG	+ 18"
3	Pello Bilbao (ESP)	Team Bahrain Victorious	+ 39"
4	Thymen Arensman (NED)	INEOS Grenadiers	+ 42"
5	Brandon McNulty (USA)	UAE Team Emirates XRG	+ 53"
6	Carlos Rodríguez (ESP)	INEOS Grenadiers	+ 54"
7	Jefferson Alveiro Cepeda (ECU)	Movistar Team	+ 1' 00"
8	Iván Romeo (ESP)	Movistar Team	+ 1' 07"
9	Jai Hindley (AUS)	Red Bull–Bora–Hansgrohe	+ 1' 31"
10	Ben O'Connor (AUS)	Team Jayco–AlUla	+ 1' 37"

=== Stage 5 ===
9 February — Alfafar to Valencia, 104.2 km (64.7 mi)

Stage 5 Result
Rank	Rider	Team	Time
1	Jonathan Milan (ITA)	Lidl–Trek	2h 09' 52"
2	Jake Stewart (GBR)	Israel–Premier Tech	+ 0"
3	Giovanni Lonardi (ITA)	Team Polti VisitMalta	+ 0"
4	Gerben Thijssen (BEL)	Intermarché–Wanty	+ 0"
5	Xabier Berasategi (ESP)	Euskaltel–Euskadi	+ 0"
6	Sente Sentjens (BEL)	Alpecin–Deceuninck	+ 0"
7	Ethan Vernon (GBR)	Israel–Premier Tech	+ 0"
8	Miguel Ángel Fernández (ESP)	Equipo Kern Pharma	+ 0"
9	Cesar Macias (MEX)	Petrolike	+ 0"
10	Michiel Lambrecht (BEL)	Wagner Bazin WB	+ 0"

General classification after Stage 5
Rank	Rider	Team	Time
1	Santiago Buitrago (COL)	Team Bahrain Victorious	16h 17' 43"
2	João Almeida (POR)	UAE Team Emirates XRG	+ 18"
3	Pello Bilbao (ESP)	Team Bahrain Victorious	+ 39"
4	Thymen Arensman (NED)	INEOS Grenadiers	+ 42"
5	Brandon McNulty (USA)	UAE Team Emirates XRG	+ 53"
6	Carlos Rodríguez (ESP)	INEOS Grenadiers	+ 54"
7	Jefferson Alveiro Cepeda (ECU)	Movistar Team	+ 1' 00"
8	Iván Romeo (ESP)	Movistar Team	+ 1' 07"
9	Jai Hindley (AUS)	Red Bull–Bora–Hansgrohe	+ 1' 31"
10	Ben O'Connor (AUS)	Team Jayco–AlUla	+ 1' 37"

== Classification leadership table ==
Classification leadership by stage
Stage	Winner	General classification	Points classification	Mountains classification	Young rider classification	Team classification
1	Lidl–Trek	Mathias Vacek	not awarded	not awarded	Mathias Vacek	Lidl–Trek
2	Santiago Buitrago	Mathias Vacek	Santiago Buitrago	Santiago Buitrago	Mathias Vacek	Team Bahrain Victorious
3	Iván Romeo	João Almeida	Santiago Buitrago	Santiago Buitrago	Iván Romeo	Team Bahrain Victorious
4	Santiago Buitrago	Santiago Buitrago	Santiago Buitrago	Jon Agirre	Carlos Rodríguez	Team Bahrain Victorious
5	Jonathan Milan	Santiago Buitrago	Santiago Buitrago	Jon Agirre	Carlos Rodríguez	Team Bahrain Victorious
Final		Santiago Buitrago	Santiago Buitrago	Jon Agirre	Carlos Rodríguez	Team Bahrain Victorious

== Classification standings ==
Legend
Denotes the winner of the general classification	Denotes the winner of the points classification
Denotes the winner of the mountains classification	Denotes the winner of the young rider classification

=== General classification ===
Final general classification (1–10)
Rank	Rider	Team	Time
1	Santiago Buitrago (COL)	Team Bahrain Victorious	16h 17' 43"
2	João Almeida (POR)	UAE Team Emirates XRG	+ 18"
3	Pello Bilbao (ESP)	Team Bahrain Victorious	+ 39"
4	Thymen Arensman (NED)	INEOS Grenadiers	+ 42"
5	Brandon McNulty (USA)	UAE Team Emirates XRG	+ 53"
6	Carlos Rodríguez (ESP)	INEOS Grenadiers	+ 54"
7	Jefferson Alveiro Cepeda (ECU)	Movistar Team	+ 1' 00"
8	Iván Romeo (ESP)	Movistar Team	+ 1' 07"
9	Jai Hindley (AUS)	Red Bull–Bora–Hansgrohe	+ 1' 31"
10	Ben O'Connor (AUS)	Team Jayco–AlUla	+ 1' 37"

=== Points classification ===
Final points classification (1–10)
Rank	Rider	Team	Points
1	Santiago Buitrago (COL)	Team Bahrain Victorious	70
2	Jonathan Milan (ITA)	Lidl–Trek	45
3	Pello Bilbao (ESP)	Team Bahrain Victorious	44
4	João Almeida (POR)	UAE Team Emirates XRG	41
5	Thymen Arensman (NED)	INEOS Grenadiers	30
6	Jefferson Alveiro Cepeda (ECU)	Movistar Team	27
7	Iván Romeo (ESP)	Movistar Team	24
8	Jake Stewart (GBR)	Israel–Premier Tech	20
9	Brandon McNulty (USA)	UAE Team Emirates XRG	20
10	Carlos Rodríguez (ESP)	INEOS Grenadiers	18

=== Mountains classification ===
Final mountains classification (1–10)
Rank	Rider	Team	Points
1	Jon Agirre (ESP)	Euskaltel–Euskadi	28
2	Diego Uriarte (ESP)	Equipo Kern Pharma	21
3	Santiago Buitrago (COL)	Team Bahrain Victorious	19
4	João Almeida (POR)	UAE Team Emirates XRG	18
5	Hugo Houle (CAN)	Israel–Premier Tech	17
6	Pello Bilbao (ESP)	Team Bahrain Victorious	13
7	Matyáš Kopecký (CZE)	Team Novo Nordisk	6
8	Tobias Foss (NOR)	INEOS Grenadiers	6
9	Ben O'Connor (AUS)	Team Jayco–AlUla	6
10	Walter Calzoni (ITA)	Q36.5 Pro Cycling Team	5

=== Young rider classification ===
Final young rider classification (1–10)
Rank	Rider	Team	Time
1	Carlos Rodríguez (ESP)	INEOS Grenadiers	16h 18' 37"
2	Iván Romeo (ESP)	Movistar Team	+ 13"
3	Lenny Martinez (FRA)	Team Bahrain Victorious	+ 1' 03"
4	Pablo Castrillo (ESP)	Movistar Team	+ 1' 58"
5	Davide Piganzoli (ITA)	Team Polti VisitMalta	+ 2' 02"
6	Andrii Ponomar (UKR)	Petrolike	+ 7' 36"
7	Clément Alleno (FRA)	Burgos Burpellet BH	+ 8' 02"
8	Iván Cobo (ESP)	Equipo Kern Pharma	+ 8' 40"
9	Luca Paletti (ITA)	VF Group–Bardiani–CSF–Faizanè	+ 8' 44"
10	Joseph Blackmore (GBR)	Israel–Premier Tech	+ 8' 45"

=== Team classification ===
Final team classification (1–10)
Rank	Team	Time
1	Team Bahrain Victorious	47h 35' 04"
2	(United Kingdom) INEOS Grenadiers	+ 2' 01"
3	(Spain) Movistar Team	+ 2' 24"
4	(United Arab Emirates) UAE Team Emirates XRG	+ 3' 01"
5	(Germany) Red Bull–Bora–Hansgrohe	+ 15' 32"
6	(Spain) Equipo Kern Pharma	+ 21' 47"
7	(Spain) Euskaltel–Euskadi	+ 23' 25"
8	(Mexico) Petrolike	+ 24' 53"
9	(Switzerland) Q36.5 Pro Cycling Team	+ 25' 39"
10	(Italy) VF Group–Bardiani–CSF–Faizanè	+ 26' 40"
