= 2023 Tour of the Alps =

Cycling race

2023 UCI ProSeries

Race details
- Dates: 17–21 April 2023
- Stages: 5
- Distance: 752.6 km (467.6 mi)
- Winning time: 19h 29' 50"

Results
Jersey awarded to the overall winner	Winner	Tao Geoghegan Hart (GBR)	(Ineos Grenadiers)
	Second	Hugh Carthy (GBR)	(EF Education–EasyPost)
	Third	Jack Haig (AUS)	(Team Bahrain Victorious)
Jersey awarded to the points classification winner	Points	Tao Geoghegan Hart (GBR)	(Ineos Grenadiers)
Jersey awarded to the mountains classification winner	Mountains	Sergio Samitier (ESP)	(Movistar Team)
Jersey awarded to the youth classification winner	Youth	Max Poole (GBR)	(Team DSM)
	Team	(Germany) Bora–Hansgrohe	

The 2023 Tour of the Alps was a road cycling stage race that took place between 17 and 21 April 2023 in the Austrian state of Tyrol and in the Italian provinces of Trentino and South Tyrol, which all make up the Tyrol–South Tyrol–Trentino Euroregion. The race was rated as a category 2.Pro event on the 2023 UCI ProSeries calendar, and is the 46th edition of the Tour of the Alps, seventh since its renaming from the Giro del Trentino.

== Teams ==
8 of the 18 UCI WorldTeams, nine UCI ProTeams, one UCI Continental team and Austrian national team made up the 19 teams that participated in the race.

UCI WorldTeams

- AG2R Citroën Team
- Astana Qazaqstan Team
- Bora–Hansgrohe
- EF Education–EasyPost
- Ineos Grenadiers
- Movistar Team
- Team Bahrain Victorious
- Team DSM

UCI ProTeams

- Caja Rural–Seguros RGA
- Eolo–Kometa
- Equipo Kern Pharma
- Euskaltel–Euskadi
- Green Project–Bardiani–CSF–Faizanè
- Israel–Premier Tech
- Q36.5 Pro Cycling Team
- Team Corratec
- Uno-X Pro Cycling Team

UCI Continental Teams

- Trinity Racing

National teams

- Austria

== Route ==
Stage characteristics and winners
Stage	Date	Course	Distance	Elevation gain	Type	Stage winner
1	17 April	Rattenberg (Austria) to Alpbach (Austria)	127.5 km (79.2 mi)	2,470 m (8,100 ft)	Intermediate stage	Tao Geoghegan Hart (GBR)
2	18 April	Reith im Alpbachtal (Austria) to Ritten (Italy)	165.2 km (102.7 mi)	2,860 m (9,380 ft)	Intermediate stage	Tao Geoghegan Hart (GBR)
3	19 April	Ritten (Italy) to Brentonico San Valentino (Italy)	162.5 km (101.0 mi)	2,940 m (9,650 ft)	Mountain stage	Lennard Kämna (GER)
4	20 April	Rovereto (Italy) to Predazzo (Italy)	152.9 km (95.0 mi)	3,610 m (11,840 ft)	Mountain stage	Gregor Mühlberger (AUT)
5	21 April	Cavalese (Italy) to Bruneck (Italy)	144.5 km (89.8 mi)	2,910 m (9,550 ft)	Intermediate stage	Simon Carr (GBR)
Total			752.6 km (467.6 mi)	14,790 m (48,520 ft)		

== Stages ==
=== Stage 1 ===
17 April 2023 – Rattenberg to Alpbach, 127.5 km (79.2 mi)

Stage 1 Result
Rank	Rider	Team	Time
1	Tao Geoghegan Hart (GBR)	Ineos Grenadiers	3h 18' 00"
2	Felix Gall (AUT)	AG2R Citroën Team	+ 2"
3	Hugh Carthy (GBR)	EF Education–EasyPost	+ 4"
4	Iván Sosa (COL)	Movistar Team	+ 6"
5	Aleksandr Vlasov	Bora–Hansgrohe	+ 6"
6	Pavel Sivakov (FRA)	Ineos Grenadiers	+ 6"
7	Lorenzo Fortunato (ITA)	Eolo–Kometa	+ 10"
8	Lennard Kämna (GER)	Bora–Hansgrohe	+ 10"
9	Santiago Buitrago (COL)	Team Bahrain Victorious	+ 10"
10	Jack Haig (AUS)	Team Bahrain Victorious	+ 14"

General classification after Stage 1
Rank	Rider	Team	Time
1	Tao Geoghegan Hart (GBR)	Ineos Grenadiers	3h 17' 50"
2	Felix Gall (AUT)	AG2R Citroën Team	+ 2"
3	Hugh Carthy (GBR)	EF Education–EasyPost	+ 4"
4	Iván Sosa (COL)	Movistar Team	+ 6"
5	Aleksandr Vlasov	Bora–Hansgrohe	+ 6"
6	Pavel Sivakov (FRA)	Ineos Grenadiers	+ 6"
7	Lorenzo Fortunato (ITA)	Eolo–Kometa	+ 10"
8	Lennard Kämna (GER)	Bora–Hansgrohe	+ 10"
9	Santiago Buitrago (COL)	Team Bahrain Victorious	+ 10"
10	Jack Haig (AUS)	Team Bahrain Victorious	+ 14"

=== Stage 2 ===
18 April 2023 – Reith im Alpbachtal to Ritten, 165.2 km (102.7 mi)

Stage 2 Result
Rank	Rider	Team	Time
1	Tao Geoghegan Hart (GBR)	Ineos Grenadiers	3h 57' 42"
2	Jack Haig (AUS)	Team Bahrain Victorious	+ 0"
3	Santiago Buitrago (COL)	Team Bahrain Victorious	+ 2"
4	Pavel Sivakov (FRA)	Ineos Grenadiers	+ 2"
5	Lorenzo Fortunato (ITA)	Eolo–Kometa	+ 2"
6	Hugh Carthy (GBR)	EF Education–EasyPost	+ 2"
7	Iván Sosa (COL)	Movistar Team	+ 2"
8	Jefferson Alexander Cepeda (ECU)	EF Education–EasyPost	+ 2"
9	Aurélien Paret-Peintre (FRA)	AG2R Citroën Team	+ 29"
10	Lennard Kämna (GER)	Bora–Hansgrohe	+ 29"

General classification after Stage 2
Rank	Rider	Team	Time
1	Tao Geoghegan Hart (GBR)	Ineos Grenadiers	7h 15' 22"
2	Felix Gall (AUT)	AG2R Citroën Team	+ 18"
3	Hugh Carthy (GBR)	EF Education–EasyPost	+ 22"
4	Pavel Sivakov (FRA)	Ineos Grenadiers	+ 28"
5	Iván Sosa (COL)	Movistar Team	+ 28"
6	Jack Haig (AUS)	Team Bahrain Victorious	+ 28"
7	Santiago Buitrago (COL)	Team Bahrain Victorious	+ 28"
8	Lorenzo Fortunato (ITA)	Eolo–Kometa	+ 32"
9	Jefferson Alexander Cepeda (ECU)	EF Education–EasyPost	+ 40"
10	Aleksandr Vlasov	Bora–Hansgrohe	+ 55"

=== Stage 3 ===
19 April 2023 – Ritten to Brentonico San Valentino, 162.5 km (101.0 mi)

Stage 3 Result
Rank	Rider	Team	Time
1	Lennard Kämna (GER)	Bora–Hansgrohe	4h 06' 13"
2	Aleksandr Vlasov	Bora–Hansgrohe	+ 4"
3	Jefferson Alexander Cepeda (ECU)	EF Education–EasyPost	+ 4"
4	Tao Geoghegan Hart (GBR)	Ineos Grenadiers	+ 4"
5	Jack Haig (AUS)	Team Bahrain Victorious	+ 4"
6	Hugh Carthy (GBR)	EF Education–EasyPost	+ 4"
7	Lorenzo Fortunato (ITA)	Eolo–Kometa	+ 10"
8	Matthew Riccitello (USA)	Israel–Premier Tech	+ 32"
9	Max Poole (GBR)	Team DSM	+ 32"
10	Pavel Sivakov (FRA)	Ineos Grenadiers	+ 32"

General classification after Stage 3
Rank	Rider	Team	Time
1	Tao Geoghegan Hart (GBR)	Ineos Grenadiers	11h 21' 39"
2	Hugh Carthy (GBR)	EF Education–EasyPost	+ 22"
3	Jack Haig (AUS)	Team Bahrain Victorious	+ 28"
4	Jefferson Alexander Cepeda (ECU)	EF Education–EasyPost	+ 36"
5	Lorenzo Fortunato (ITA)	Eolo–Kometa	+ 38"
6	Lennard Kämna (GER)	Bora–Hansgrohe	+ 45"
7	Aleksandr Vlasov	Bora–Hansgrohe	+ 49"
8	Pavel Sivakov (FRA)	Ineos Grenadiers	+ 56"
9	Santiago Buitrago (COL)	Team Bahrain Victorious	+ 56"
10	Felix Gall (AUT)	AG2R Citroën Team	+ 1' 20"

=== Stage 4 ===
20 April 2023 – Rovereto to Predazzo, 152.9 km (95.0 mi)

Stage 4 Result
Rank	Rider	Team	Time
1	Gregor Mühlberger (AUT)	Movistar Team	4h 16' 53"
2	Torstein Træen (NOR)	Uno-X Pro Cycling Team	+ 0"
3	Giulio Pellizzari (ITA)	Green Project–Bardiani–CSF–Faizanè	+ 0"
4	Patrick Konrad (AUT)	Bora–Hansgrohe	+ 40"
5	Stefan de Bod (RSA)	EF Education–EasyPost	+ 40"
6	Óscar Rodríguez (ESP)	Movistar Team	+ 40"
7	Marco Frigo (ITA)	Israel–Premier Tech	+ 40"
8	Geoffrey Bouchard (FRA)	AG2R Citroën Team	+ 40"
9	Mark Donovan (GBR)	Q36.5 Pro Cycling Team	+ 40"
10	Antonio Pedrero (ESP)	Movistar Team	+ 40"

General classification after Stage 4
Rank	Rider	Team	Time
1	Tao Geoghegan Hart (GBR)	Ineos Grenadiers	15h 41' 54"
2	Hugh Carthy (GBR)	EF Education–EasyPost	+ 22"
3	Jack Haig (AUS)	Team Bahrain Victorious	+ 28"
4	Jefferson Alexander Cepeda (ECU)	EF Education–EasyPost	+ 36"
5	Lorenzo Fortunato (ITA)	Eolo–Kometa	+ 38"
6	Lennard Kämna (GER)	Bora–Hansgrohe	+ 45"
7	Aleksandr Vlasov	Bora–Hansgrohe	+ 49"
8	Pavel Sivakov (FRA)	Ineos Grenadiers	+ 56"
9	Santiago Buitrago (COL)	Team Bahrain Victorious	+ 56"
10	Felix Gall (AUT)	AG2R Citroën Team	+ 1' 20"

=== Stage 5 ===
21 April 2023 – Cavalese to Bruneck, 144.5 km (89.8 mi)

Stage 5 Result
Rank	Rider	Team	Time
1	Simon Carr (GBR)	EF Education–EasyPost	3h 43' 28"
2	Georg Steinhauser (GER)	EF Education–EasyPost	+ 53"
3	Matteo Fabbro (ITA)	Bora–Hansgrohe	+ 53"
4	Florian Lipowitz (GER)	Bora–Hansgrohe	+ 55"
5	Johannes Kulset (NOR)	Uno-X Pro Cycling Team	+ 1' 21"
6	Luca Covili (ITA)	Green Project–Bardiani–CSF–Faizanè	+ 2' 09"
7	Geoffrey Bouchard (FRA)	AG2R Citroën Team	+ 2' 40"
8	Txomin Juaristi (ESP)	Euskaltel–Euskadi	+ 2' 40"
9	Valentin Paret-Peintre (FRA)	AG2R Citroën Team	+ 2' 50"
10	Andrea Vendrame (ITA)	AG2R Citroën Team	+ 3' 00"

General classification after Stage 5
Rank	Rider	Team	Time
1	Tao Geoghegan Hart (GBR)	Ineos Grenadiers	19h 29' 50"
2	Hugh Carthy (GBR)	EF Education–EasyPost	+ 22"
3	Jack Haig (AUS)	Team Bahrain Victorious	+ 28"
4	Jefferson Alexander Cepeda (ECU)	EF Education–EasyPost	+ 36"
5	Lorenzo Fortunato (ITA)	Eolo–Kometa	+ 38"
6	Lennard Kämna (GER)	Bora–Hansgrohe	+ 45"
7	Pavel Sivakov (FRA)	Ineos Grenadiers	+ 56"
8	Santiago Buitrago (COL)	Team Bahrain Victorious	+ 58"
9	Felix Gall (AUT)	AG2R Citroën Team	+ 1' 20"
10	Torstein Træen (NOR)	Uno-X Pro Cycling Team	+ 1' 34"

== Classification leadership table ==
Classification leadership by stage
Stage	Winner	General classification	Points classification	Mountains classification	Young rider classification	Team classification
1	Tao Geoghegan Hart	Tao Geoghegan Hart	Tao Geoghegan Hart	Jefferson Alexander Cepeda	Max Poole	Ineos Grenadiers
2	Tao Geoghegan Hart	Tao Geoghegan Hart	Tao Geoghegan Hart	Santiago Buitrago	Max Poole	Ineos Grenadiers
3	Lennard Kämna	Tao Geoghegan Hart	Tao Geoghegan Hart	Jefferson Alexander Cepeda	Max Poole	Ineos Grenadiers
4	Gregor Mühlberger	Tao Geoghegan Hart	Tao Geoghegan Hart	Jefferson Alexander Cepeda	Max Poole	Ineos Grenadiers
5	Simon Carr	Tao Geoghegan Hart	Tao Geoghegan Hart	Sergio Samitier	Max Poole	Bora–Hansgrohe
Final		Tao Geoghegan Hart	Tao Geoghegan Hart	Sergio Samitier	Max Poole	Bora–Hansgrohe

== Final classification standings ==
Legend
Denotes the winner of the general classification	Denotes the winner of the mountains classification
Denotes the winner of the points classification	Denotes the winner of the young rider classification

=== General classification ===
Final general classification (1–10)
Rank	Rider	Team	Time
1	Tao Geoghegan Hart (GBR)	Ineos Grenadiers	19h 29' 50"
2	Hugh Carthy (GBR)	EF Education–EasyPost	+ 22"
3	Jack Haig (AUS)	Team Bahrain Victorious	+ 28"
4	Jefferson Alexander Cepeda (ECU)	EF Education–EasyPost	+ 36"
5	Lorenzo Fortunato (ITA)	Eolo–Kometa	+ 38"
6	Lennard Kämna (GER)	Bora–Hansgrohe	+ 45"
7	Pavel Sivakov (FRA)	Ineos Grenadiers	+ 56"
8	Santiago Buitrago (COL)	Team Bahrain Victorious	+ 58"
9	Felix Gall (AUT)	AG2R Citroën Team	+ 1' 20"
10	Torstein Træen (NOR)	Uno-X Pro Cycling Team	+ 1' 34"

=== Points classification ===
Final points classification (1–10)
Rank	Rider	Team	Time
1	Tao Geoghegan Hart (GBR)	Ineos Grenadiers	58
2	Moran Vermeulen (AUT)	Austria	50
3	Gregor Mühlberger (AUT)	Movistar Team	39
4	Simon Carr (GBR)	EF Education–EasyPost	37
5	Lennard Kämna (GER)	Bora–Hansgrohe	29
6	Georg Steinhauser (GER)	EF Education–EasyPost	28
7	Jack Haig (AUS)	Team Bahrain Victorious	25
8	Giulio Pellizzari (ITA)	Green Project–Bardiani–CSF–Faizanè	22
9	Hugh Carthy (GBR)	EF Education–EasyPost	22
10	Felix Gall (AUT)	AG2R Citroën Team	18

=== Mountains classification ===
Final mountains classification (1–10)
Rank	Rider	Team	Time
1	Sergio Samitier (ESP)	Movistar Team	20
2	Jefferson Alexander Cepeda (ECU)	EF Education–EasyPost	12
3	Lennard Kämna (GER)	Bora–Hansgrohe	10
4	Antonio Pedrero (ESP)	Movistar Team	10
5	Óscar Rodríguez (ESP)	Movistar Team	10
6	Simon Carr (GBR)	EF Education–EasyPost	9
7	Luca Covili (ITA)	Green Project–Bardiani–CSF–Faizanè	8
8	Santiago Buitrago (COL)	Team Bahrain Victorious	6
9	Giulio Pellizzari (ITA)	Green Project–Bardiani–CSF–Faizanè	6
10	Jasha Sütterlin (GER)	Team Bahrain Victorious	6

=== Young rider classification ===
Final young rider classification (1–10)
Rank	Rider	Team	Time
1	Max Poole (GBR)	Team DSM	19h 31' 36"
2	Johannes Kulset (NOR)	Uno-X Pro Cycling Team	+ 1' 18"
3	Matthew Riccitello (USA)	Israel–Premier Tech	+ 1' 48"
4	Finlay Pickering (GBR)	Trinity Racing	+ 9' 46"
5	Georg Steinhauser (GER)	EF Education–EasyPost	+ 13' 02"
6	Edoardo Zambanini (ITA)	Team Bahrain Victorious	+ 13' 07"
7	Giulio Pellizzari (ITA)	Green Project–Bardiani–CSF–Faizanè	+ 15' 43"
8	Alex Tolio (ITA)	Green Project–Bardiani–CSF–Faizanè	+ 21' 53"
9	Florian Lipowitz (GER)	Bora–Hansgrohe	+ 32' 33"
10	Valentin Paret-Peintre (FRA)	AG2R Citroën Team	+ 32' 37"

=== Team classification ===
Final team classification (1–10)
Rank	Team	Time
1	(Germany) Bora–Hansgrohe	58h 28' 15"
2	(United Kingdom) Ineos Grenadiers	+ 6' 00"
3	(United States) EF Education–EasyPost	+ 7' 46"
4	Team Bahrain Victorious	+ 9' 50"
5	(France) AG2R Citroën Team	+ 13' 57"
6	Israel–Premier Tech	+ 15' 44"
7	(Spain) Movistar Team	+ 20' 34"
8	(Switzerland) Q36.5 Pro Cycling Team	+ 34' 05"
9	(Spain) Euskaltel–Euskadi	+ 36' 28"
10	(Italy) Green Project–Bardiani–CSF–Faizanè	+ 37' 28"
