= Simon Carr =

Simon Carr may refer to:

- Simon Carr (tennis)
- Simon Carr (cyclist)
- Simon Carr, author of the 2001 memoir, The Boys Are Back in Town, made into a film The Boys Are Back
