= 2023 Tour de Langkawi =

Malaysian cycling race

2023 UCI ProSeries

Race details
- Dates: 23–30 September 2023
- Stages: 8
- Distance: 1,278.1 km (794.2 mi)
- Winning time: 29h 17' 41"

Results
Jersey awarded to the overall winner	Winner	Simon Carr (GBR)	(EF Education–EasyPost)
	Second	Jefferson Alexander Cepeda (ECU)	(EF Education–EasyPost)
	Third	Pablo Castrillo (ESP)	(Equipo Kern Pharma)
Jersey awarded to the points classification winner	Points	Arvid de Kleijn (NED)	(Tudor Pro Cycling Team)
Jersey awarded to the mountains classification winner	Mountains	Simon Pellaud (SUI)	(Tudor Pro Cycling Team)
	Team	(United States) EF Education–EasyPost	

The 2023 Tour de Langkawi (known as the Petronas Le Tour de Langkawi for sponsorship reasons) was a road cycling stage race that took place from 23 to 30 September 2023 in Malaysia. The race is a category 2.Pro-rated event as part of the 2023 UCI ProSeries, and is the 27th edition of the Tour de Langkawi.

The 2023 race was initially taken off from the UCI calendar after the UCI received complains from teams of not receiving payments for appearance fees and flight tickets from last year's race. Malaysia National Cycling Federation vice president Datuk Amarjit Singh Gill said that the race will go on as scheduled and he will get a clearer picture of the situation during the world body's board meeting. In August 2023, the UCI agreed to reinstate the race in its calendar, with the National Sports Council making key changes on payments to participants from this year's race onwards.

== Teams ==
Two of the 18 UCI WorldTeams, eight UCI ProTeams, eleven UCI Continental teams, and one national team make up the 22 teams that are participating in the race.

UCI WorldTeams

- Astana Qazaqstan Team
- EF Education–EasyPost

UCI ProTeams

- Bolton Equities Black Spoke
- Caja Rural–Seguros RGA
- Equipo Kern Pharma
- Euskaltel–Euskadi
- Green Project–Bardiani–CSF–Faizanè
- Human Powered Health
- Team Corratec–Selle Italia
- Tudor Pro Cycling Team

UCI Continental Teams

- 7 Eleven–Cliqq–air21 by Roadbike Philippines
- Giant Cycling Team
- Hengxiang Cycling Team
- JCL Team Ukyo
- KSPO Professional
- Li-Ning Star
- Nusantara Cycling Team
- Roojai Online Insurance
- St George Continental Cycling Team
- Terengganu Polygon Cycling Team
- Thailand Continental Cycling Team

National Teams

- Malaysia

== Route ==
Stage characteristics and winners
Stage	Date	Course	Distance	Type	Stage winner
1	23 September	Kerteh to Kuala Terengganu	187.4 km (116.4 mi)	Flat stage	Arvid de Kleijn (NED)
2	24 September	Kuala Terengganu to Kota Bharu	186.2 km (115.7 mi)	Flat stage	Gleb Syritsa
3	25 September	Jeli to Baling	183.1 km (113.8 mi)	Mountain stage	George Jackson (NZL)
4	26 September	Bukit Mertajam to Meru Raya	140.2 km (87.1 mi)	Flat stage	Daniel Babor (CZE)
5	27 September	Slim River to Genting Highlands	126.4 km (78.5 mi)	Mountain stage	Simon Carr (GBR)
6	28 September	Karak to Malacca	174.5 km (108.4 mi)	Flat stage	Arvid de Kleijn (NED)
7	29 September	Muar to Seremban	123.8 km (76.9 mi)	Flat stage	Sasha Weemaes (BEL)
8	30 September	Setia Alam to Kuala Lumpur	156.5 km (97.2 mi)	Flat stage	Gleb Syritsa
Total			1,278.1 km (794.2 mi)		

== Stages ==
=== Stage 1 ===
23 September 2023 — Kerteh to Kuala Terengganu, 187.4 km (116.4 mi)

Stage 1 Result
Rank	Rider	Team	Time
1	Arvid de Kleijn (NED)	Tudor Pro Cycling Team	4h 25' 48"
2	Sasha Weemaes (BEL)	Human Powered Health	+ 0"
3	Gleb Syritsa	Astana Qazaqstan Team	+ 0"
4	Mohamad Izzat Hilmi Abdul Halil (MAS)	Malaysia	+ 0"
5	Enrico Zanoncello (ITA)	Green Project–Bardiani–CSF–Faizanè	+ 0"
6	Lorenzo Conforti (ITA)	Green Project–Bardiani–CSF–Faizanè	+ 0"
7	Carlos Canal (ESP)	Euskaltel–Euskadi	+ 0"
8	Tomáš Bárta (CZE)	Caja Rural–Seguros RGA	+ 0"
9	Harrif Saleh (MAS)	Terengganu Polygon Cycling Team	+ 0"
10	Nur Amirul Fakhruddin Mazuki (MAS)	Terengganu Polygon Cycling Team	+ 0"

General classification after Stage 1
Rank	Rider	Team	Time
1	Arvid de Kleijn (NED)	Tudor Pro Cycling Team	4h 25' 38"
2	Sasha Weemaes (BEL)	Human Powered Health	+ 4"
3	Batsaikhany Tegshbayar (MGL)	Roojai Online Insurance	+ 4"
4	Gleb Syritsa	Astana Qazaqstan Team	+ 6"
5	Sarawut Sirironnachai (THA)	Thailand Continental Cycling Team	+ 7"
6	Tomáš Bárta (CZE)	Caja Rural–Seguros RGA	+ 8"
7	Pablo Castrillo (ESP)	Equipo Kern Pharma	+ 8"
8	Simon Carr (GBR)	EF Education–EasyPost	+ 8"
9	Michael Valgren (DEN)	EF Education–EasyPost	+ 9"
10	Joan Bou (ESP)	Euskaltel–Euskadi	+ 9"

=== Stage 2 ===
24 September 2023 — Kuala Terengganu to Kota Bharu, 186.2 km (115.7 mi)

Stage 2 Result
Rank	Rider	Team	Time
1	Gleb Syritsa	Astana Qazaqstan Team	4h 15' 14"
2	Arvid de Kleijn (NED)	Tudor Pro Cycling Team	+ 0"
3	Enrico Zanoncello (ITA)	Green Project–Bardiani–CSF–Faizanè	+ 0"
4	Daniel Babor (CZE)	Caja Rural–Seguros RGA	+ 0"
5	Davide Gabburo (ITA)	Green Project–Bardiani–CSF–Faizanè	+ 0"
6	Lorenzo Conforti (ITA)	Green Project–Bardiani–CSF–Faizanè	+ 0"
7	Raymond Kreder (NED)	JCL Team Ukyo	+ 0"
8	Riku Onaka (JPN)	JCL Team Ukyo	+ 0"
9	Maikel Zijlaard (NED)	Tudor Pro Cycling Team	+ 0"
10	Alessandro Iacchi (ITA)	Team Corratec–Selle Italia	+ 0"

General classification after Stage 2
Rank	Rider	Team	Time
1	Arvid de Kleijn (NED)	Tudor Pro Cycling Team	8h 40' 46"
2	Gleb Syritsa	Astana Qazaqstan Team	+ 2"
3	Sasha Weemaes (BEL)	Human Powered Health	+ 10"
4	Batsaikhany Tegshbayar (MGL)	Roojai Online Insurance	+ 10"
5	Simon Carr (GBR)	EF Education–EasyPost	+ 12"
6	Enrico Zanoncello (ITA)	Green Project–Bardiani–CSF–Faizanè	+ 12"
7	Tomáš Bárta (CZE)	Caja Rural–Seguros RGA	+ 13"
8	Sarawut Sirironnachai (THA)	Thailand Continental Cycling Team	+ 13"
9	Jon Agirre (ESP)	Equipo Kern Pharma	+ 13"
10	Tom Scully (NZL)	EF Education–EasyPost	+ 13"

=== Stage 3 ===
25 September 2023 — Jeli to Baling, 183.1 km (113.8 mi)

Stage 3 Result
Rank	Rider	Team	Time
1	George Jackson (NZL)	Bolton Equities Black Spoke	4h 14' 13"
2	Enrico Zanoncello (ITA)	Green Project–Bardiani–CSF–Faizanè	+ 0"
3	Carlos Canal (ESP)	Euskaltel–Euskadi	+ 0"
4	Gijs Van Hoecke (BEL)	Human Powered Health	+ 0"
5	Jeroen Meijers (NED)	Terengganu Polygon Cycling Team	+ 0"
6	Nur Aiman Rosli (MAS)	Malaysia	+ 0"
7	Sainbayaryn Jambaljamts (MGL)	Terengganu Polygon Cycling Team	+ 0"
8	Lorenzo Conforti (ITA)	Green Project–Bardiani–CSF–Faizanè	+ 0"
9	Alexander Konychev (ITA)	Team Corratec–Selle Italia	+ 0"
10	Gorka Sorarrain (ESP)	Caja Rural–Seguros RGA	+ 0"

General classification after Stage 3
Rank	Rider	Team	Time
1	Enrico Zanoncello (ITA)	Green Project–Bardiani–CSF–Faizanè	12h 55' 05"
2	George Jackson (NZL)	Bolton Equities Black Spoke	+ 0"
3	Simon Carr (GBR)	EF Education–EasyPost	+ 4"
4	Carlos Canal (ESP)	Euskaltel–Euskadi	+ 6"
5	Joan Bou (ESP)	Euskaltel–Euskadi	+ 6"
6	Jon Agirre (ESP)	Equipo Kern Pharma	+ 7"
7	Tom Scully (NZL)	EF Education–EasyPost	+ 7"
8	Pablo Castrillo (ESP)	Equipo Kern Pharma	+ 8"
9	Logan Currie (NZL)	Bolton Equities Black Spoke	+ 8"
10	Jokin Murguialday (ESP)	Caja Rural–Seguros RGA	+ 8"

=== Stage 4 ===
26 September 2023 — Bukit Mertajam to Meru Raya, 140.2 km (87.1 mi)

Stage 4 Result
Rank	Rider	Team	Time
1	Daniel Babor (CZE)	Caja Rural–Seguros RGA	3h 06' 05"
2	George Jackson (NZL)	Bolton Equities Black Spoke	+ 0"
3	Sasha Weemaes (BEL)	Human Powered Health	+ 0"
4	Carlos Canal (ESP)	Euskaltel–Euskadi	+ 0"
5	Lorenzo Conforti (ITA)	Green Project–Bardiani–CSF–Faizanè	+ 0"
6	Attilio Viviani (ITA)	Team Corratec–Selle Italia	+ 0"
7	Māris Bogdanovičs (LAT)	Hengxiang Cycling Team	+ 0"
8	Arvid de Kleijn (NED)	Tudor Pro Cycling Team	+ 0"
9	Enrico Zanoncello (ITA)	Green Project–Bardiani–CSF–Faizanè	+ 0"
10	Gleb Syritsa	Astana Qazaqstan Team	+ 0"

General classification after Stage 4
Rank	Rider	Team	Time
1	George Jackson (NZL)	Bolton Equities Black Spoke	16h 01' 04"
2	Enrico Zanoncello (ITA)	Green Project–Bardiani–CSF–Faizanè	+ 6"
3	Simon Carr (GBR)	EF Education–EasyPost	+ 10"
4	Carlos Canal (ESP)	Euskaltel–Euskadi	+ 12"
5	Ratchanon Yaowarat (THA)	Thailand Continental Cycling Team	+ 12"
6	Joan Bou (ESP)	Euskaltel–Euskadi	+ 12"
7	Jon Agirre (ESP)	Equipo Kern Pharma	+ 13"
8	Tom Scully (NZL)	EF Education–EasyPost	+ 13"
9	Pablo Castrillo (ESP)	Equipo Kern Pharma	+ 14"
10	Logan Currie (NZL)	Bolton Equities Black Spoke	+ 14"

=== Stage 5 ===
27 September 2023 — Slim River to Genting Highlands, 126.4 km (78.5 mi)

Stage 5 Result
Rank	Rider	Team	Time
1	Simon Carr (GBR)	EF Education–EasyPost	3h 24' 06"
2	Jefferson Alexander Cepeda (ECU)	EF Education–EasyPost	+ 39"
3	Pablo Castrillo (ESP)	Equipo Kern Pharma	+ 48"
4	Joan Bou (ESP)	Euskaltel–Euskadi	+ 55"
5	Vadim Pronskiy (KAZ)	Astana Qazaqstan Team	+ 59"
6	Paul Double (GBR)	Human Powered Health	+ 1' 13"
7	Adne van Engelen (NED)	Roojai Online Insurance	+ 1' 18"
8	Jokin Murguialday (ESP)	Caja Rural–Seguros RGA	+ 1' 26"
9	Jon Agirre (ESP)	Equipo Kern Pharma	+ 1' 26"
10	Harold Martín López (ECU)	Astana Qazaqstan Team	+ 1' 47"

General classification after Stage 5
Rank	Rider	Team	Time
1	Simon Carr (GBR)	EF Education–EasyPost	19h 25' 10"
2	Jefferson Alexander Cepeda (ECU)	EF Education–EasyPost	+ 49"
3	Pablo Castrillo (ESP)	Equipo Kern Pharma	+ 58"
4	Joan Bou (ESP)	Euskaltel–Euskadi	+ 1' 07"
5	Vadim Pronskiy (KAZ)	Astana Qazaqstan Team	+ 1' 15"
6	Paul Double (GBR)	Human Powered Health	+ 1' 29"
7	Adne van Engelen (NED)	Roojai Online Insurance	+ 1' 34"
8	Jon Agirre (ESP)	Equipo Kern Pharma	+ 1' 39"
9	Jokin Murguialday (ESP)	Caja Rural–Seguros RGA	+ 1' 40"
10	Harold Martín López (ECU)	Astana Qazaqstan Team	+ 2' 03"

=== Stage 6 ===
28 September 2023 — Karak to Malacca, 174.5 km (108.4 mi)

Stage 6 Result
Rank	Rider	Team	Time
1	Arvid de Kleijn (NED)	Tudor Pro Cycling Team	4h 08' 19"
2	Sasha Weemaes (BEL)	Human Powered Health	+ 0"
3	Gleb Syritsa	Astana Qazaqstan Team	+ 0"
4	Enrico Zanoncello (ITA)	Green Project–Bardiani–CSF–Faizanè	+ 0"
5	Daniel Babor (CZE)	Caja Rural–Seguros RGA	+ 0"
6	Gijs Van Hoecke (BEL)	Human Powered Health	+ 0"
7	Alexander Konychev (ITA)	Team Corratec–Selle Italia	+ 0"
8	Matthew Bostock (GBR)	Bolton Equities Black Spoke	+ 0"
9	Carlos Canal (ESP)	Euskaltel–Euskadi	+ 0"
10	Attilio Viviani (ITA)	Team Corratec–Selle Italia	+ 0"

General classification after Stage 6
Rank	Rider	Team	Time
1	Simon Carr (GBR)	EF Education–EasyPost	23h 33' 29"
2	Jefferson Alexander Cepeda (ECU)	EF Education–EasyPost	+ 49"
3	Pablo Castrillo (ESP)	Equipo Kern Pharma	+ 58"
4	Joan Bou (ESP)	Euskaltel–Euskadi	+ 1' 07"
5	Vadim Pronskiy (KAZ)	Astana Qazaqstan Team	+ 1' 15"
6	Paul Double (GBR)	Human Powered Health	+ 1' 29"
7	Adne van Engelen (NED)	Roojai Online Insurance	+ 1' 34"
8	Jon Agirre (ESP)	Equipo Kern Pharma	+ 1' 39"
9	Jokin Murguialday (ESP)	Caja Rural–Seguros RGA	+ 1' 40"
10	Harold Martín López (ECU)	Astana Qazaqstan Team	+ 2' 03"

=== Stage 7 ===
29 September 2023 — Muar to Seremban, 123.8 km (76.9 mi)

Stage 7 Result
Rank	Rider	Team	Time
1	Sasha Weemaes (BEL)	Human Powered Health	2h 31' 45"
2	Arvid de Kleijn (NED)	Tudor Pro Cycling Team	+ 0"
3	Gleb Syritsa	Astana Qazaqstan Team	+ 0"
4	Matthew Bostock (GBR)	Bolton Equities Black Spoke	+ 0"
5	Attilio Viviani (ITA)	Team Corratec–Selle Italia	+ 0"
6	Raymond Kreder (NED)	JCL Team Ukyo	+ 0"
7	Youcef Reguigui (ALG)	Terengganu Polygon Cycling Team	+ 0"
8	Enrico Zanoncello (ITA)	Green Project–Bardiani–CSF–Faizanè	+ 0"
9	Maikel Zijlaard (NED)	Tudor Pro Cycling Team	+ 0"
10	Māris Bogdanovičs (LAT)	Hengxiang Cycling Team	+ 0"

General classification after Stage 7
Rank	Rider	Team	Time
1	Simon Carr (GBR)	EF Education–EasyPost	26h 05' 14"
2	Jefferson Alexander Cepeda (ECU)	EF Education–EasyPost	+ 49"
3	Pablo Castrillo (ESP)	Equipo Kern Pharma	+ 58"
4	Joan Bou (ESP)	Euskaltel–Euskadi	+ 1' 07"
5	Vadim Pronskiy (KAZ)	Astana Qazaqstan Team	+ 1' 15"
6	Paul Double (GBR)	Human Powered Health	+ 1' 29"
7	Adne van Engelen (NED)	Roojai Online Insurance	+ 1' 34"
8	Jon Agirre (ESP)	Equipo Kern Pharma	+ 1' 39"
9	Jokin Murguialday (ESP)	Caja Rural–Seguros RGA	+ 1' 40"
10	Harold Martín López (ECU)	Astana Qazaqstan Team	+ 2' 03"

=== Stage 8 ===
30 September 2023 — Setia Alam to Kuala Lumpur, 156.5 km (97.2 mi)

Stage 8 Result
Rank	Rider	Team	Time
1	Gleb Syritsa	Astana Qazaqstan Team	3h 12' 27"
2	Daniel Babor (CZE)	Caja Rural–Seguros RGA	+ 0"
3	Arvid de Kleijn (NED)	Tudor Pro Cycling Team	+ 0"
4	Sasha Weemaes (BEL)	Human Powered Health	+ 0"
5	Mohamad Izzat Hilmi Abdul Halil (MAS)	Malaysia	+ 0"
6	George Jackson (NZL)	Bolton Equities Black Spoke	+ 0"
7	Enrico Zanoncello (ITA)	Green Project–Bardiani–CSF–Faizanè	+ 0"
8	Attilio Viviani (ITA)	Team Corratec–Selle Italia	+ 0"
9	Sarawut Sirironnachai (THA)	Thailand Continental Cycling Team	+ 0"
10	Raymond Kreder (NED)	JCL Team Ukyo	+ 0"

General classification after Stage 8
Rank	Rider	Team	Time
1	Simon Carr (GBR)	EF Education–EasyPost	29h 17' 41"
2	Jefferson Alexander Cepeda (ECU)	EF Education–EasyPost	+ 49"
3	Pablo Castrillo (ESP)	Equipo Kern Pharma	+ 58"
4	Joan Bou (ESP)	Euskaltel–Euskadi	+ 1' 07"
5	Vadim Pronskiy (KAZ)	Astana Qazaqstan Team	+ 1' 15"
6	Paul Double (GBR)	Human Powered Health	+ 1' 29"
7	Adne van Engelen (NED)	Roojai Online Insurance	+ 1' 34"
8	Jon Agirre (ESP)	Equipo Kern Pharma	+ 1' 39"
9	Jokin Murguialday (ESP)	Caja Rural–Seguros RGA	+ 1' 40"
10	Harold Martín López (ECU)	Astana Qazaqstan Team	+ 2' 03"

== Classification leadership table ==
Classification leadership by stage
Stage	Winner	General classification	Points classification	Mountains classification	Asian rider classification	Team classification	Combativity award
1	Arvid de Kleijn	Arvid de Kleijn	Arvid de Kleijn	Nur Aiman Mohd Zariff	Batsaikhany Tegshbayar	Malaysia	Batsaikhany Tegshbayar
2	Gleb Syritsa	Arvid de Kleijn	Arvid de Kleijn	Nur Amirul Fakhruddin Mazuki	Batsaikhany Tegshbayar	Green Project–Bardiani–CSF–Faizanè	Calum Johnston
3	George Jackson	Enrico Zanoncello	Arvid de Kleijn	Simon Pellaud	Nur Aiman Rosli	Green Project–Bardiani–CSF–Faizanè	Simon Carr
4	Daniel Babor	George Jackson	Arvid de Kleijn	Simon Pellaud	Ratchanon Yaowarat	Green Project–Bardiani–CSF–Faizanè	Giulio Masotto
5	Simon Carr	Simon Carr	Arvid de Kleijn	Simon Pellaud	Vadim Pronskiy	EF Education–EasyPost	Simon Pellaud
6	Arvid de Kleijn	Simon Carr	Arvid de Kleijn	Simon Pellaud	Vadim Pronskiy	EF Education–EasyPost	Sainbayaryn Jambaljamts
7	Sasha Weemaes	Simon Carr	Arvid de Kleijn	Simon Pellaud	Vadim Pronskiy	EF Education–EasyPost	Masaki Yamamoto
8	Gleb Syritsa	Simon Carr	Arvid de Kleijn	Simon Pellaud	Vadim Pronskiy	EF Education–EasyPost	Simon Pellaud
Final		Simon Carr	Arvid de Kleijn	Simon Pellaud	Vadim Pronskiy	EF Education–EasyPost	

== Classification standings ==
Legend
Denotes the winner of the general classification	Denotes the winner of the mountains classification
Denotes the winner of the points classification	Denotes the winner of the Asian rider classification

=== General classification ===
Final general classification (1–10)
Rank	Rider	Team	Time
1	Simon Carr (GBR)	EF Education–EasyPost	29h 17' 41"
2	Jefferson Alexander Cepeda (ECU)	EF Education–EasyPost	+ 49"
3	Pablo Castrillo (ESP)	Equipo Kern Pharma	+ 58"
4	Joan Bou (ESP)	Euskaltel–Euskadi	+ 1' 07"
5	Vadim Pronskiy (KAZ)	Astana Qazaqstan Team	+ 1' 15"
6	Paul Double (GBR)	Human Powered Health	+ 1' 29"
7	Adne van Engelen (NED)	Roojai Online Insurance	+ 1' 34"
8	Jon Agirre (ESP)	Equipo Kern Pharma	+ 1' 39"
9	Jokin Murguialday (ESP)	Caja Rural–Seguros RGA	+ 1' 40"
10	Harold Martín López (ECU)	Astana Qazaqstan Team	+ 2' 03"

=== Points classification ===
Final points classification (1–10)
Rank	Rider	Team	Points
1	Arvid de Kleijn (NED)	Tudor Pro Cycling Team	72
2	Gleb Syritsa	Astana Qazaqstan Team	58
3	Sasha Weemaes (BEL)	Human Powered Health	55
4	Enrico Zanoncello (ITA)	Green Project–Bardiani–CSF–Faizanè	45
5	Daniel Babor (CZE)	Caja Rural–Seguros RGA	40
6	George Jackson (NZL)	Bolton Equities Black Spoke	34
7	Lorenzo Conforti (ITA)	Green Project–Bardiani–CSF–Faizanè	19
8	Sainbayaryn Jambaljamts (MGL)	Terengganu Polygon Cycling Team	15
9	Attilio Viviani (ITA)	Team Corratec–Selle Italia	15
10	Nur Aiman Rosli (MAS)	Malaysia	14

=== Mountains classification ===
Final mountains classification (1–10)
Rank	Rider	Team	Points
1	Simon Pellaud (SUI)	Tudor Pro Cycling Team	32
2	Simon Carr (GBR)	EF Education–EasyPost	20
3	Pablo Castrillo (ESP)	Equipo Kern Pharma	13
4	Luca Covili (ITA)	Green Project–Bardiani–CSF–Faizanè	13
5	Jefferson Alexander Cepeda (ECU)	EF Education–EasyPost	12
6	Matteo Scalco (ITA)	Green Project–Bardiani–CSF–Faizanè	11
7	Joan Bou (ESP)	Euskaltel–Euskadi	8
8	Paul Double (GBR)	Human Powered Health	8
9	Manuele Tarozzi (ITA)	Green Project–Bardiani–CSF–Faizanè	8
10	Adne van Engelen (NED)	Roojai Online Insurance	7

=== Asian rider classification ===
Final Asian rider classification (1–10)
Rank	Rider	Team	Time
1	Vadim Pronskiy (KAZ)	Astana Qazaqstan Team	29h 18' 56"
2	Sainbayaryn Jambaljamts (MGL)	Terengganu Polygon Cycling Team	+ 2' 04"
3	Ariya Phounsavath (LAO)	Roojai Online Insurance	+ 4' 49"
4	Thanakhan Chaiyasombat (THA)	Thailand Continental Cycling Team	+ 5' 33"
5	Nur Aiman Rosli (MAS)	Malaysia	+ 8' 01"
6	Shao Junqi (CHN)	Li-Ning Star	+ 8' 35"
7	Navuti Liphongyu (THA)	Thailand Continental Cycling Team	+ 9' 22"
8	Muhamad Nur Aiman Mohd Zariff (MAS)	Terengganu Polygon Cycling Team	+ 12' 17"
9	Muhammad Shaiful Adlan Mohd Shukri (MAS)	Malaysia	+ 13' 48"
10	Gao Yongbing (CHN)	Hengxiang Cycling Team	+ 14' 48"

=== Team classification ===
Final team classification (1–10)
Rank	Team	Time
1	(United States) EF Education–EasyPost	87h 57' 01"
2	(Spain) Euskaltel–Euskadi	+ 2' 18"
3	(Spain) Equipo Kern Pharma	+ 3' 43"
4	(Thailand) Roojai Online Insurance	+ 11' 32"
5	(Spain) Caja Rural–Seguros RGA	+ 11' 46"
6	(China) Li-Ning Star	+ 19' 54"
7	(Italy) Green Project–Bardiani–CSF–Faizanè	+ 21' 04"
8	(United States) Human Powered Health	+ 24' 29"
9	(Italy) Team Corratec–Selle Italia	+ 25' 10"
10	Thailand Continental Cycling Team	+ 25' 16"
