= Sasha Weemaes =

Belgian bicycle racer

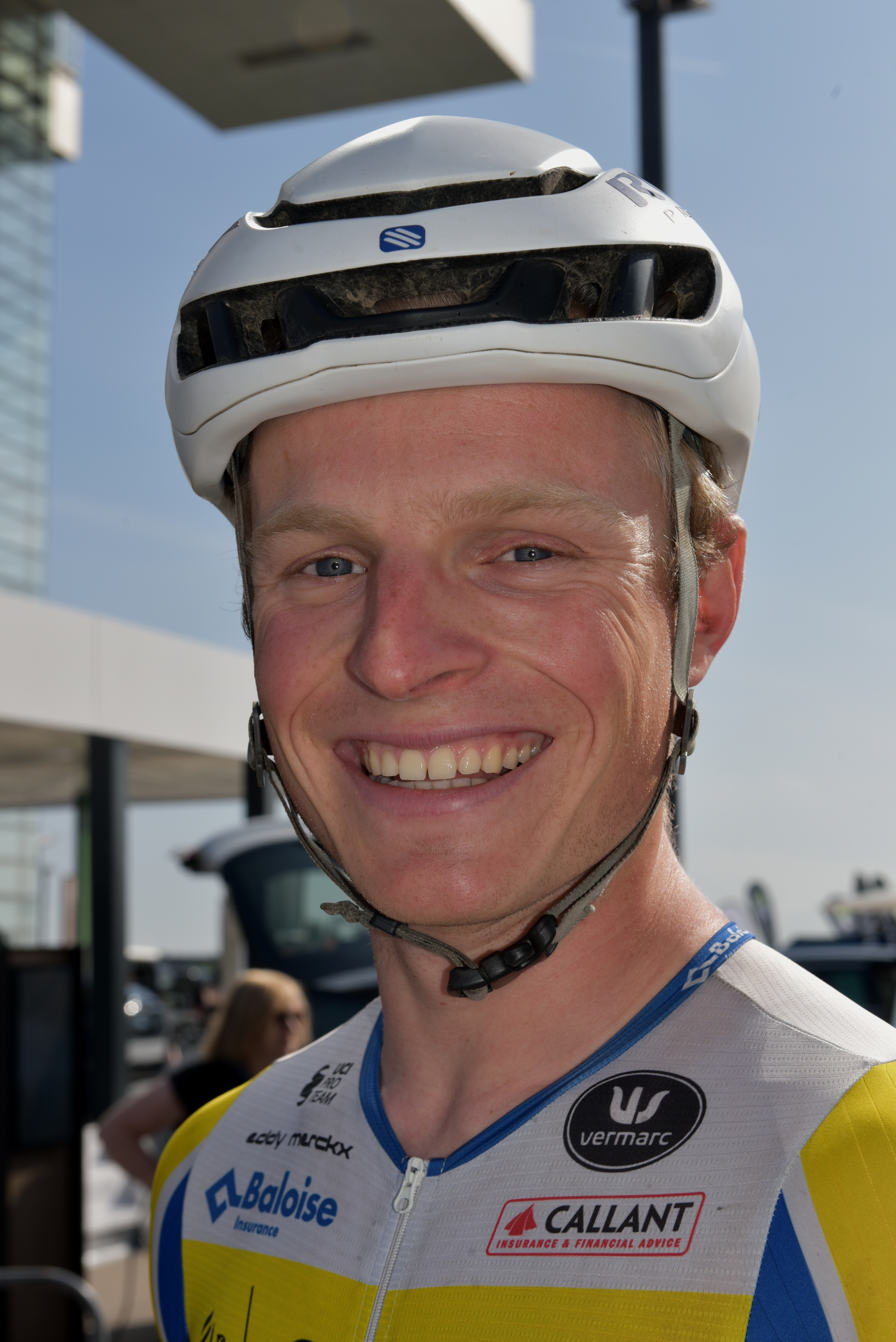
- Weemaes in 2022

Personal information
- Full name: Sasha Weemaes
- Born: 9 February 1998 (age 28) Sint-Niklaas, Belgium
- Height: 1.77 m (5 ft 10 in)
- Weight: 73 kg (161 lb)

Cycling career
- Sport: Cycling
- Disciplines: Road; Track
- Role: Rider
- Rider type: Sprinter

Amateur team
- 2017–2018: EFC–L&R–Vulsteke

Professional teams
- 2018–2022: Sport Vlaanderen–Baloise
- 2023: Human Powered Health
- 2024–2025: Bingoal WB

Sasha Weemaes (born 9 February 1998) is a Belgian road and track cyclist.

== Major results ==
2015
Sint-Martinusprijs Kontich

1st Points classification
1st Stages 3a & 3b

2016
1st Stage 1 Keizer der Juniores
2017
2nd Team pursuit, UEC European Under-23 Track Championships
10th Grote Prijs Stad Sint-Niklaas
2018
1st Time trial, National Under-23 Road Championships
1st Stage 1 Paris–Arras Tour
2nd ZLM Tour
5th Grote Prijs Jean-Pierre Monseré
6th Grand Prix Criquielion
2019
6th Bredene Koksijde Classic
4th De Kustpijl
2020
1st Heistse Pijl
5th Gooikse Pijl
2021
3rd Elfstedenronde
2022
2nd Dorpenomloop Rucphen
2nd Gullegem Koerse
3rd Trofeo Playa de Palma
4th Road race, National Road Championships
4th Elfstedenronde
5th La Roue Tourangelle
6th Veenendaal–Veenendaal
2023 (1 pro win)
1st Stage 7 Tour de Langkawi
6th Gullegem Koerse
2025
10th Scheldeprijs
