= Álvaro Cuadros =

Spanish bicycle racer

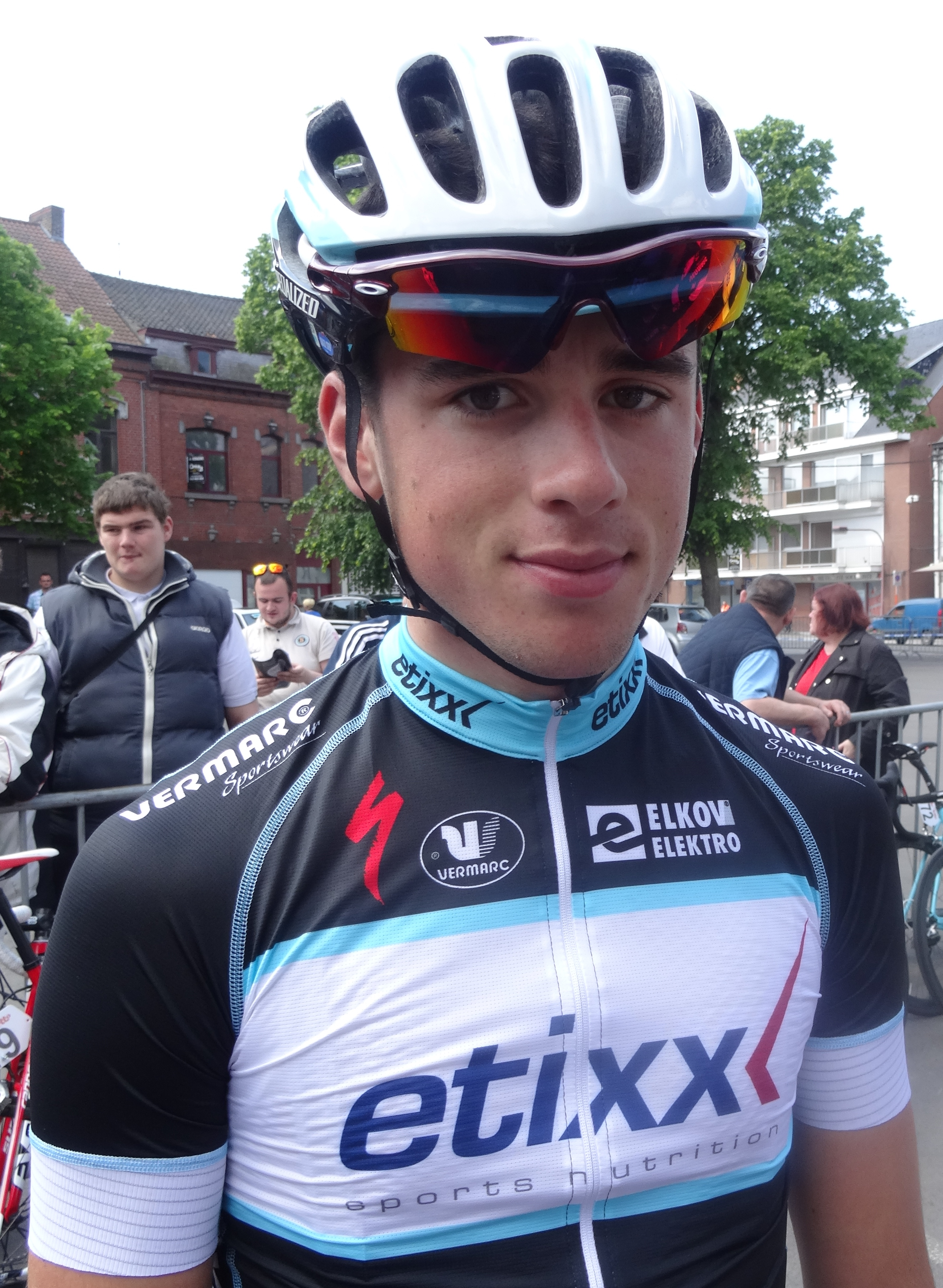
- Cuadros in 2014

Personal information
- Full name: Álvaro Cuadros Morata
- Born: 12 April 1995 (age 31) Granada, Spain
- Height: 1.79 m (5 ft 10 in)
- Weight: 67 kg (148 lb)

Cycling career
- Sport: Cycling
- Current team: Retired
- Discipline: Road
- Role: Rider

Amateur teams
- 2016: RH+–Polartec–Fundación Alberto Contador
- 2017: Caja Rural–Seguros RGA amateur

Professional teams
- 2014–2015: Etixx
- 2018–2022: Caja Rural–Seguros RGA

Álvaro Cuadros Morata (born 12 April 1995) is a Spanish former cyclist, who competed as a professional from 2014 to 2022.

== Major results ==
2013
3rd Time trial, National Junior Road Championships
2015
2nd Overall Carpathian Couriers Race

1st Young rider classification

10th Overall East Bohemia Tour
2017
2nd Road race, National Under-23 Road Championships
2018
8th Circuito de Getxo
2021
1st Mountains classification Route d'Occitanie
Combativity award Stage 13 Vuelta a España

=== Grand Tour general classification results timeline ===
Grand Tour	2021
Giro d'Italia	—
Tour de France	—
Vuelta a España	78

Legend
—	Did not compete
DNF	Did not finish
