= Joan Bou =

Spanish cyclist

Personal information
- Full name: Joan Bou Company
- Born: 16 January 1997 (age 29) Valencia, Spain

Cycling career
- Sport: Cycling
- Current team: Caja Rural–Seguros RGA
- Discipline: Road
- Role: Rider

Amateur teams
- 2014–2017: Specialized–Fundación Alberto Contador
- 2017: Nippo–Vini Fantini (stagiaire)

Professional teams
- 2018–2019: Nippo–Vini Fantini–Europa Ovini
- 2020–2024: Fundación–Orbea
- 2025–: Caja Rural–Seguros RGA

Joan Bou Company (born 16 January 1997) is a Spanish cyclist, who currently rides for UCI ProTeam Caja Rural–Seguros RGA.

== Major results ==
2019
8th Overall Tour de Hokkaido

1st Mountains classification

2021
4th Overall Troféu Joaquim Agostinho

1st Mountains classification

Combativity award Stage 6 Vuelta a España
2022
Vuelta a España

Held after Stage 4
Combativity award Stage 13

2023
4th Overall Tour de Langkawi
10th Overall Vuelta a Burgos
2024
2nd Giro della Romagna
2nd Clásica Terres de l'Ebre
8th Overall Volta a Portugal
2026
4th Road race, National Road Championships

=== Grand Tour general classification results timeline ===
Grand Tour	2021	2022	2023	2024
Giro d'Italia	—	—	—	—
Tour de France	—	—	—	—
Vuelta a España	103	82	—	72

Legend
—	Did not compete
DNF	Did not finish
