= Simon Carr (cyclist) =

British cyclist (born 1998)

Personal information
- Full name: Simon Francis Carr
- Born: 29 August 1998 (age 28) Hereford, England, UK
- Height: 1.82 m (5 ft 11 1/2 in)
- Weight: 63 kg (139 lb; 9 st 13 lb)

Cycling career
- Sport: Cycling
- Current team: Cofidis
- Discipline: Road
- Role: Rider
- Rider type: Climber

Amateur teams
- 2013–2016: AJCHVA–Limoux Junior
- 2017–2018: Occitane Cyclisme Formation
- 2019–2020: AVC Aix-en-Provence
- 2019: Delko–Marseille Provence (stagiaire)

Professional teams
- 2020: Nippo–Delko–One Provence
- 2021–2024: EF Education–Nippo
- 2025–: Cofidis

Major wins
- Stage races Tour de Langkawi (2023)

Simon Francis Carr (born 29 August 1998) is a British professional road racing cyclist, who currently rides for UCI WorldTeam Cofidis. Although born in Hereford, England, to Welsh parents, he was brought up in the foothills of the Pyrenees and is bilingual in English and French. He currently races under the British flag with a French licence, but has declared himself as Welsh in a bid to compete in the 2022 Commonwealth Games. In August 2024, Carr announced he would join the French cycling team Cofidis beginning the following season on a three-year contract.

== Major results ==
2017
Tour de Martinique

1st Stages 3, 7 & 10

2018
3rd Overall Tour du Piémont Pyrénéen

1st Young rider classification

2019
1st Overall Volta a Valencia

1st Young rider classification

1st Grand Prix de Biran
1st Stage 1 Tour du Beaujolais
1st Stage 4 Vuelta a Navarra
1st Stage 2 (TTT) Tour du Piémont Pyrénéen
2nd Overall Vuelta al Bidasoa

1st Stage 4

10th Overall Tour de Savoie Mont Blanc
2020 (1 pro win)
1st Prueba Villafranca de Ordizia
1st Young rider classification, Volta a Portugal
2021
8th Mont Ventoux Dénivelé Challenge
9th Overall Route d'Occitanie

1st Young rider classification

2022
4th Overall Settimana Internazionale di Coppi e Bartali
2023 (4)
1st Overall Tour de Langkawi

1st Stage 5

1st Stage 5 Tour of the Alps
1st Stage 4 Route d'Occitanie
3rd Mont Ventoux Dénivelé Challenge
2024 (2)
1st Trofeo Calvià
Tour of the Alps

1st Mountains classification
1st Stage 4

2026
3rd Tour des Alpes-Maritimes
6th Andorra MoraBanc Clàssica

=== Grand Tour general classification results timeline ===
Grand Tour	2021	2022	2023	2024
Giro d'Italia	66	DNF	—	DNF
Tour de France	—	—	—	—
Vuelta a España	DNF	—	—	—

Legend
—	Did not compete
DNF	Did not finish
