= Santa Gadea del Cid =

- Municipality and town
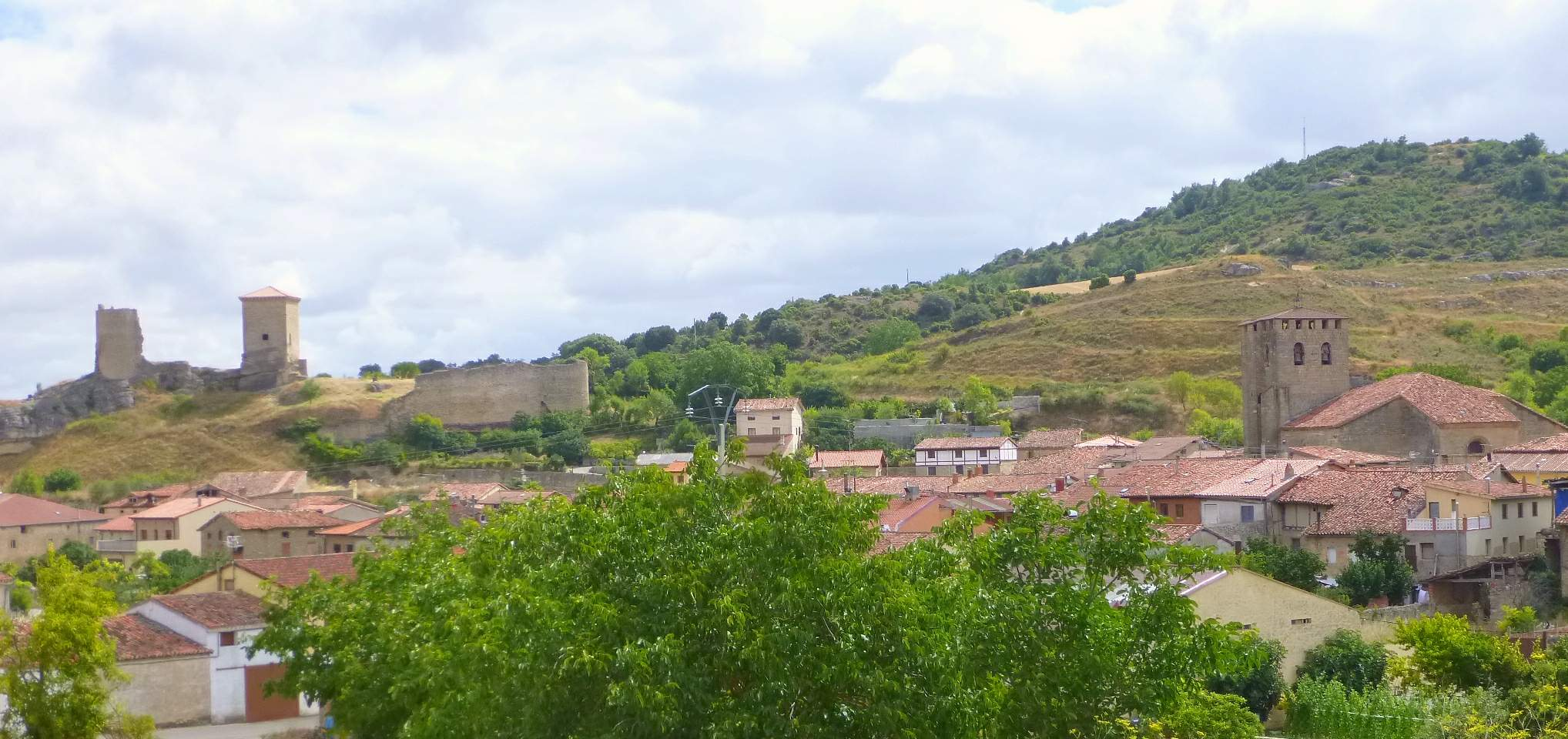
- Santa Gadea del Cid

- Flag Coat of arms

- Location within Castile and León Location within Spain
- Coordinates: 42°42′53″N 3°03′33″W
- Country: Spain
- Autonomous community: Castile and León
- Province: Burgos
- Comarca: Comarca del Ebro

Area
  - Total: 28.98 km^{2} (11.19 sq mi)
- Elevation: 506 m (1,660 ft)

Population (2025-01-01)
  - Total: 180
  - Density: 6.2/km^{2} (16/sq mi)
- Time zone: UTC+1 (CET)
  - Summer (DST): UTC+2 (CEST)
- Postal code: 09219
- Website: http://www.santagadeadelcid.es/

Santa Gadea del Cid is a municipality and town located in the province of Burgos, Castile and León, Spain. According to the 2004 census (INE), the municipality had a population of 174 inhabitants.
