= Pradoluengo =

Coordinates: 42°19′N 3°12′W

- Municipality and town
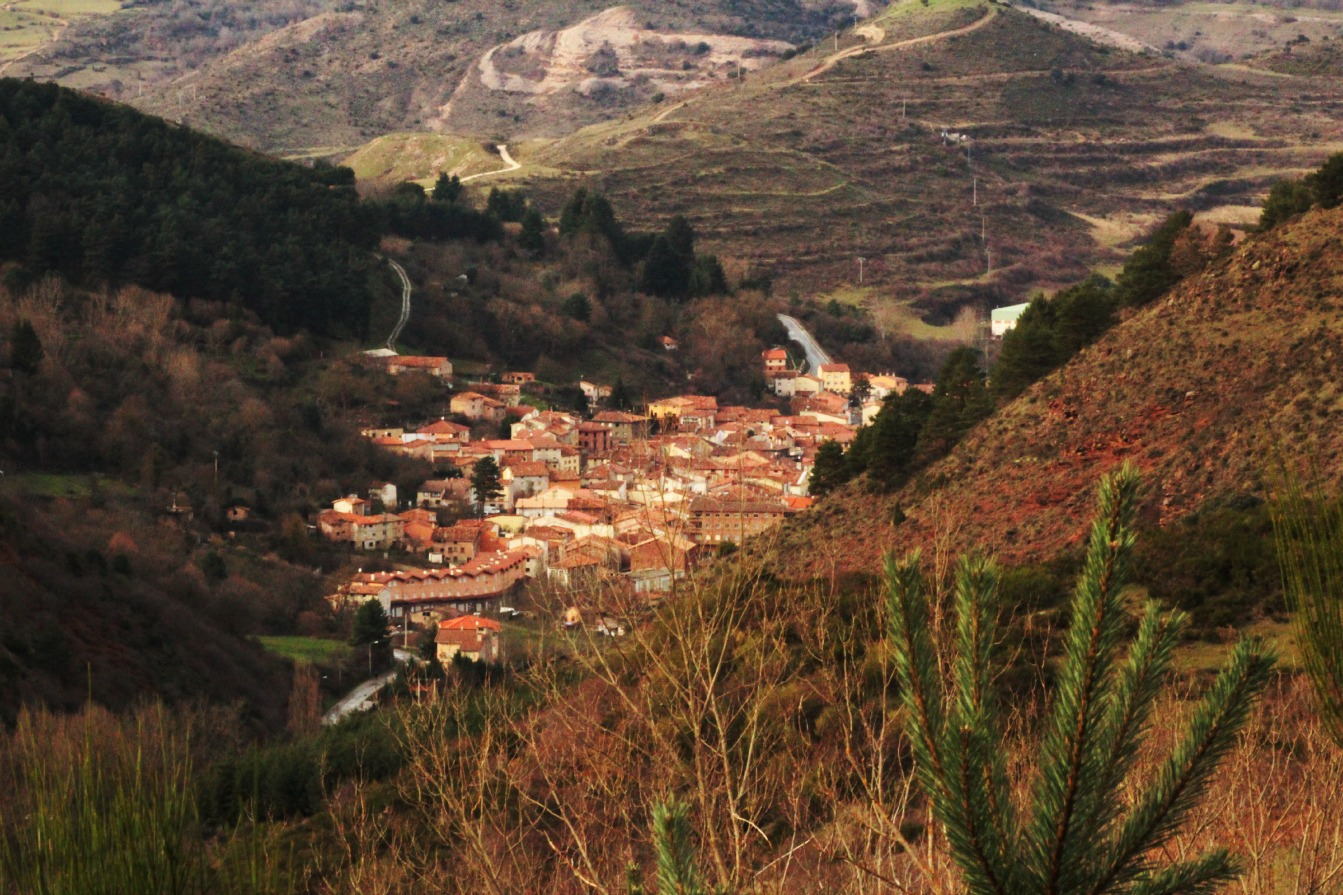
- View of Pradoluengo

- Flag Coat of arms
- Nickname: Villa textil
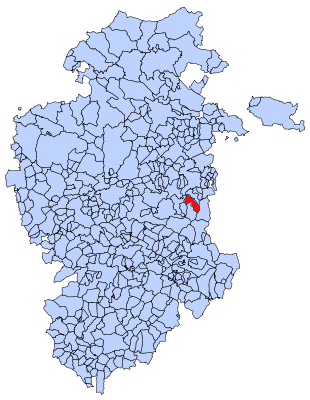
- Municipal location of Pradoluengo in Burgos province
- Country: Spain
- Autonomous community: Castile and León
- Province: Burgos
- Comarca: Montes de Oca

Area
  - Total: 30 km^{2} (12 sq mi)
- Elevation: 962 m (3,156 ft)

Population (2025-01-01)
  - Total: 1,090
  - Density: 36/km^{2} (94/sq mi)
- Time zone: UTC+1 (CET)
  - Summer (DST): UTC+2 (CEST)
- Website: http://www.pradoluengo.es/

Pradoluengo is a municipality and town located in the province of Burgos, Castile and León in eastern Spain. According to the 2004 census (INE), the municipality has a population of 1,651 inhabitants.

== Geography ==
The town is located at an altitude of 959m.
