= Jon Agirre =

Spanish cyclist (born 1997)

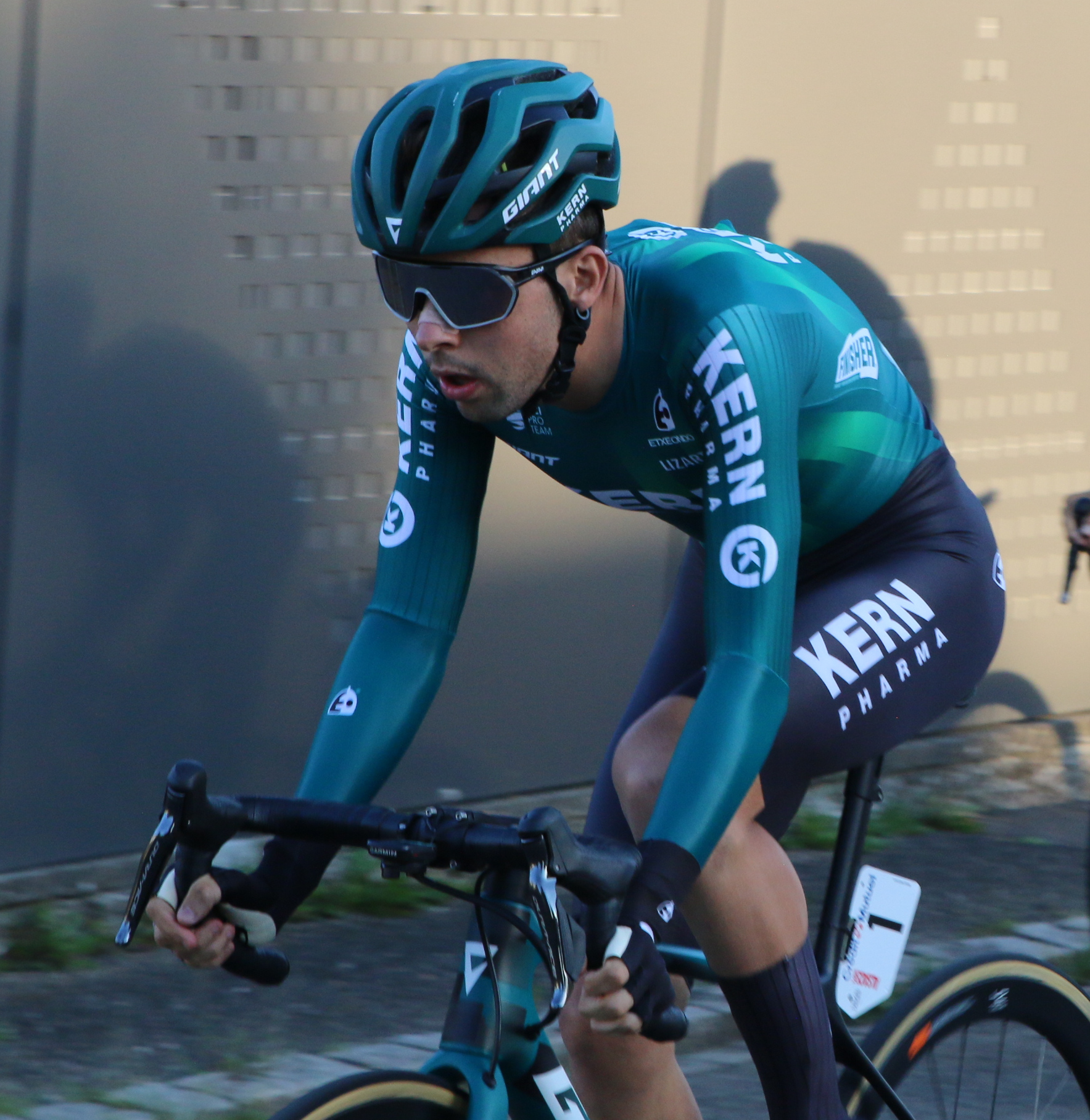
- Agirre at the 2022 Tour Alsace

Personal information
- Full name: Jon Agirre Egaña
- Born: 10 September 1997 (age 29) Zumaia, Spain
- Height: 1.73 m (5 ft 8 in)
- Weight: 54 kg (119 lb)

Cycling career
- Sport: Cycling
- Current team: Euskaltel–Euskadi
- Discipline: Road
- Role: Rider
- Rider type: Climber

Amateur teams
- 2016: Parking Geltokia
- 2017: Grupo Eulen
- 2018–2019: Baqué–Ideus–BH

Professional teams
- 2020–2024: Equipo Kern Pharma
- 2025–: Euskaltel–Euskadi

Jon Agirre Egaña (born 10 September 1997) is a Spanish cyclist, who currently rides for UCI ProTeam Euskaltel–Euskadi.

== Major results ==
2019
1st Mountains classification, Tour de l'Avenir
2021
4th Overall Alpes Isère Tour
2023
8th Overall Tour de Langkawi
9th Overall Czech Tour
2025
1st Mountains classification, Volta a la Comunitat Valenciana
