= Villalba de Duero =

Coordinates: 41°41′N 3°44′W

- municipality
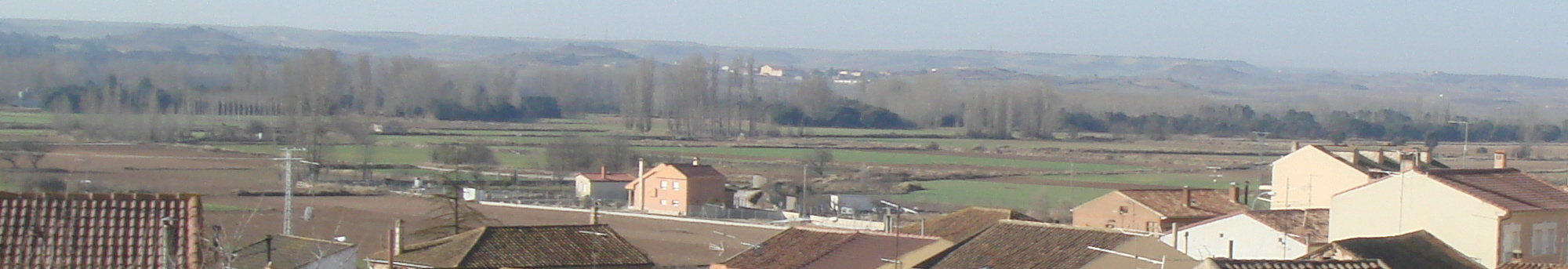
- Villalba landscape

- Coat of arms
- Interactive map of Villalba de Duero
- Country: Spain
- Autonomous community: Castile and León
- Province: Burgos

Area
  - Total: 13 km^{2} (5.0 sq mi)

Population (2025-01-01)
  - Total: 720
  - Density: 55/km^{2} (140/sq mi)
- Time zone: UTC+1 (CET)
  - Summer (DST): UTC+2 (CEST)

Villalba de Duero is a municipality located in the province of Burgos, Castile and León, Spain. According to the 2004 census (INE), the municipality has a population of 617 inhabitants.
