= Antonio Pedrero =

Spanish cyclist

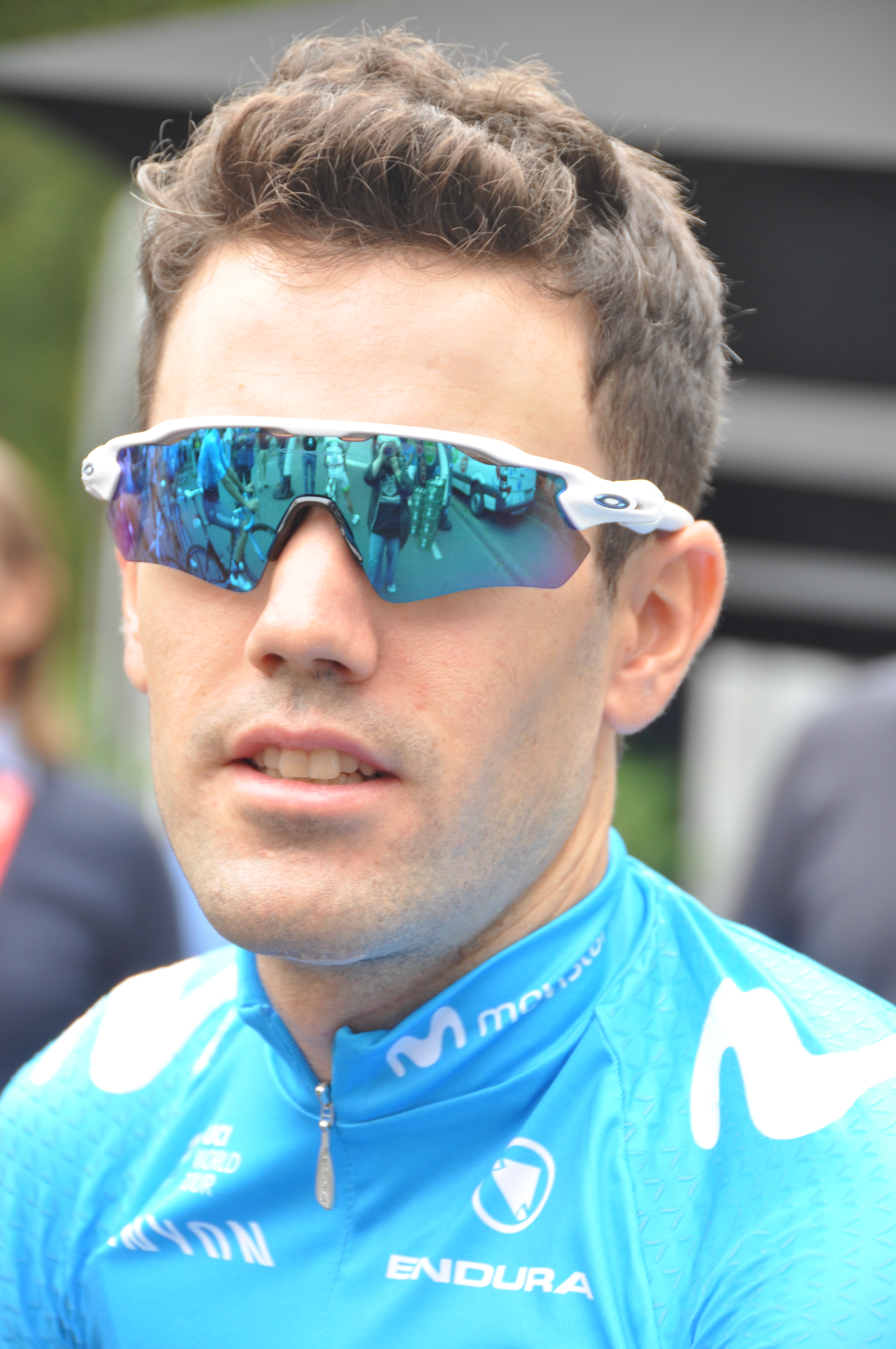
- Pedrero at the 2018 Deutschland Tour

Personal information
- Full name: Antonio Pedrero López
- Born: 23 October 1991 (age 34) Terrassa, Spain
- Height: 1.77 m (5 ft 10 in)
- Weight: 69 kg (152 lb)

Cycling career
- Sport: Cycling
- Discipline: Road
- Role: Rider
- Rider type: Climber

Amateur teams
- 2010–2011: Seguros Bilbao
- 2012–2015: Lizarte

Professional teams
- 2015: Inteja–MMR Dominican Cycling Team
- 2016–2025: Movistar Team

Antonio Pedrero López (born 23 October 1991 in Terrassa) is a Spanish cyclist. He was named in the startlist for the 2017 Vuelta a España. In May 2018, he was named in the startlist for the 2018 Giro d'Italia.

== Major results ==
2009
4th Overall Vuelta al Besaya

1st Stage 3

2014
1st Overall Vuelta a Navarra

1st Stage 1

2015
3rd Overall Tour de Guadeloupe

1st Stage 9

2016
10th Circuito de Getxo
10th Overall Tour de l'Ain
2018
5th Prueba Villafranca de Ordizia
8th Overall Vuelta a Asturias
2019
4th Overall Vuelta a Burgos
6th Prueba Villafranca de Ordizia
2021 (2 pro wins)
1st Overall Route d'Occitanie

1st Stage 3

2nd Overall Vuelta a Asturias
8th Coppa Sabatini
2022 (1)
5th Overall Tour de l'Ain

1st Stage 3

5th Overall Vuelta a Asturias
6th Prueba Villafranca de Ordizia
8th Overall Deutschland Tour
2024
10th Overall Tour de l'Ain

=== Grand Tour general classification results timeline ===
Grand Tour	2017	2018	2019	2020	2021	2022	2023
Giro d'Italia	—	92	46	19	22	27	—
Tour de France	—	—	—	—	—	—	DNF
Vuelta a España	51	—	43	—	—	—	

Legend
—	Did not compete
DNF	Did not finish
