= Pablo Castrillo =

Spanish cyclist (born 2001)

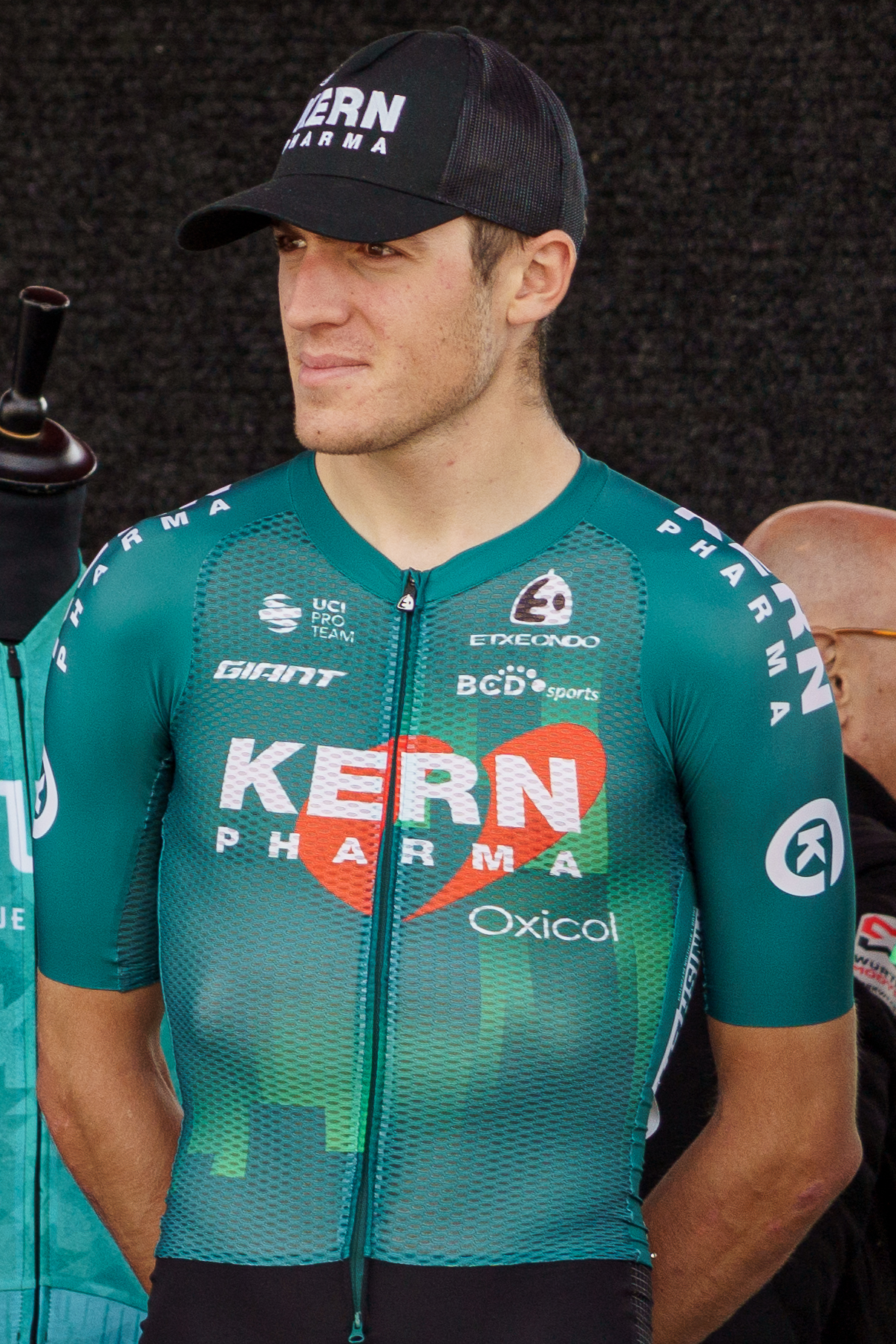
- Castrillo in 2024

Personal information
- Born: 2 January 2001 (age 25) Jaca, Spain
- Height: 1.83 m (6 ft 0 in)
- Weight: 74 kg (163 lb)

Cycling career
- Sport: Cycling
- Current team: Movistar Team
- Discipline: Road
- Role: Rider
- Rider type: Climber

Amateur team
- 2020–2022: Lizarte

Professional teams
- 2022: Equipo Kern Pharma (stagiaire)
- 2023–2024: Equipo Kern Pharma
- 2025–: Movistar Team

Major wins
- Grand Tours Vuelta a España 2 individual stages (2024) One-day races and Classics National Time Trial Championships (2026)

Pablo Castrillo Zapater (born 2 January 2001) is a Spanish cyclist, who currently rides for UCI WorldTeam Movistar Team. His brother Jaime also competed as a professional cyclist until 2022.

He took his first two professional wins at the 2024 Vuelta a España, winning stages 12 and 15 from the breakaway. He won stage 15 by distancing himself from Aleksandr Vlasov and Pavel Sivakov on the "hellish" slopes of Cuitu Negru - one of the most brutal climbs of that year's Vuelta.

== Major results ==
2022
1st Time trial, National Under-23 Road Championships
1st Memorial Valenciaga
1st Subida a Gorla
1st Oñati Proba
1st Lazkaoko Proba
1st Memorial Cirilo Zunzarren
3rd Aiztondo Klasika
2023
3rd Overall Tour de Langkawi
2024 (2 pro wins)
Vuelta a España

1st Stages 12 & 15
Combativity award Stages 4 & 12

5th Overall Tour of Slovenia
7th Overall Vuelta a Burgos
7th Overall CRO Race
2025
7th Overall UAE Tour
9th Overall Tour de Suisse
2026 (1)
1st Time trial, National Road Championships
Combativity award Stage 4 Tour de France

=== Grand Tour general classification results timeline ===
Grand Tour	2024	2025	2026
Giro d'Italia	—	—	—
Tour de France	—	110	29
Vuelta a España	64	DNF	

Legend
—	Did not compete
DNF	Did not finish
