= List of teams and cyclists in the 2021 Vuelta a España =

List of cyclists

The following is a list of teams and cyclists that took part in the 2021 Vuelta a España.

== Teams ==
Twenty-three teams participated in the 2021 Vuelta a España. All nineteen UCI WorldTeams were obliged to participate. Four UCI ProTeams also participated: Alpecin–Fenix was automatically invited as the best-performing ProTeam in 2020, as well as three wildcard teams selected by the Amaury Sport Organization. Usually, only twenty-two teams would participate in the race, but the Union Cycliste Internationale allowed grand tour organizers to invite one extra wildcard team in 2021 to account for hardship created by the COVID-19 pandemic.

UCI WorldTeams

- AG2R Citroën Team
- Astana–Premier Tech
- Bora–Hansgrohe
- Cofidis
- Deceuninck–Quick-Step
- EF Education–Nippo
- Groupama–FDJ
- Ineos Grenadiers
- Intermarché–Wanty–Gobert Matériaux
- Israel Start-Up Nation
- Lotto–Soudal
- Movistar Team
- Team Bahrain Victorious
- Team BikeExchange
- Team DSM
- Team Jumbo–Visma
- Team Qhubeka NextHash
- Trek–Segafredo
- UAE Team Emirates

UCI ProTeams

- Alpecin–Fenix
- Burgos BH
- Caja Rural–Seguros RGA
- Euskaltel–Euskadi

== Cyclists ==
Legend
| No. | Starting number worn by the rider during the Vuelta |
| Pos. | Position in the general classification |
| Time | Deficit to the winner of the general classification |
| † | Denotes riders born on or after 1 January 1996 eligible for the young rider classification |
| | Denotes the winner of the general classification |
| | Denotes the winner of the points classification |
| | Denotes the winner of the mountains classification |
| | Denotes the winner of the young rider classification (eligibility indicated by †) |
| A white jersey with a red number bib. | Denotes the winner of the team classification |
| A white jersey with a yellow number bib. | Denotes the winner of the combativity award |
| DNS | Denotes a rider who did not start, followed by the stage before which he withdrew |
| DNF | Denotes a rider who did not finish, followed by the stage in which he withdrew |
| DSQ | Denotes a rider who was disqualified from the race, followed by the stage in which this occurred |
| HD | Denotes a rider finished outside the time limit, followed by the stage in which they did so |
| COV | Denotes a rider who withdrawn because of COVID-19 either because he tested positive or team members tested positive, followed by the stage before which he withdrew |
Ages correct as of Saturday 14 August 2021, the date on which the Vuelta begins

=== By starting number ===
| No. | Name | Nationality | Team | Age | Pos. | Time | Ref. |
|---|---|---|---|---|---|---|---|
| 1 | Primož Roglič | Slovenia | Team Jumbo–Visma | 31 | 1 | 83h 55' 29" | |
| 2 | Koen Bouwman | Netherlands | Team Jumbo–Visma | 27 | 42 | + 2h 24' 30" | |
| 3 | Robert Gesink | Netherlands | Team Jumbo–Visma | 35 | 62 | + 3h 15' 18" | |
| 4 | Lennard Hofstede | Netherlands | Team Jumbo–Visma | 26 | 128 | + 5h 20' 45" | |
| 5 | Steven Kruijswijk | Netherlands | Team Jumbo–Visma | 34 | 12 | + 26' 42" | |
| 6 | Sepp Kuss | United States | Team Jumbo–Visma | 26 | 8 | + 18' 55" | |
| 7 | Sam Oomen | Netherlands | Team Jumbo–Visma | 25 | 18 | + 1h 09' 25" | |
| 8 | Nathan Van Hooydonck | Belgium | Team Jumbo–Visma | 25 | 82 | + 3h 50' 19" | |
| 11 | Geoffrey Bouchard | France | AG2R Citroën Team | 29 | 14 | + 49' 09" | |
| 12 | Lilian Calmejane | France | AG2R Citroën Team | 28 | 33 | + 2h 03' 52" | |
| 13 | Clément Champoussin † | France | AG2R Citroën Team | 23 | 16 | + 57' 29" | |
| 14 | Mikaël Cherel | France | AG2R Citroën Team | 35 | 45 | + 2h 30' 26" | |
| 15 | Stan Dewulf † | Belgium | AG2R Citroën Team | 23 | 65 | + 3h 21' 21" | |
| 16 | Nicolas Prodhomme † | France | AG2R Citroën Team | 24 | 52 | + 2h 53' 05" | |
| 17 | Damien Touzé † | France | AG2R Citroën Team | 25 | 79 | + 3h 47' 28" | |
| 18 | Clément Venturini | France | AG2R Citroën Team | 27 | 97 | + 4h 18' 28" | |
| 21 | Jay Vine | Australia | Alpecin–Fenix | 25 | 73 | + 3h 40' 31" | |
| 22 | Tobias Bayer † | Austria | Alpecin–Fenix | 21 | DNF-12 | – | |
| 23 | Floris De Tier | Belgium | Alpecin–Fenix | 29 | 48 | + 2h 37' 18" | |
| 24 | Alexander Krieger | Germany | Alpecin–Fenix | 29 | 117 | + 4h 47' 15" | |
| 25 | Sacha Modolo | Italy | Alpecin–Fenix | 34 | DNF-19 | – | |
| 26 | Jasper Philipsen † | Belgium | Alpecin–Fenix | 23 | DNS-11 | – | |
| 27 | Edward Planckaert | Belgium | Alpecin–Fenix | 26 | 122 | + 5h 03' 10" | |
| 28 | Scott Thwaites | Great Britain | Alpecin–Fenix | 31 | 134 | + 5h 36' 20" | |
| 31 | Aleksandr Vlasov † | Russia | Astana–Premier Tech | 25 | DNS-20 | – | |
| 32 | Alex Aranburu | Spain | Astana–Premier Tech | 25 | DNS-11 | – | |
| 33 | Omar Fraile | Spain | Astana–Premier Tech | 31 | DNS-13 | – | |
| 34 | Gorka Izagirre | Spain | Astana–Premier Tech | 33 | 27 | + 1h 39' 03" | |
| 35 | Ion Izagirre | Spain | Astana–Premier Tech | 32 | 26 | + 1h 37' 47" | |
| 36 | Yuriy Natarov † | Kazakhstan | Astana–Premier Tech | 24 | 91 | + 4h 02' 04" | |
| 37 | Óscar Rodríguez | Spain | Astana–Premier Tech | 26 | DNF-7 | – | |
| 38 | Luis León Sánchez | Spain | Astana–Premier Tech | 37 | DNF-17 | – | |
| 41 | Mikel Landa | Spain | Team Bahrain Victorious | 31 | DNF-17 | – | |
| 42 | Yukiya Arashiro | Japan | Team Bahrain Victorious | 36 | 116 | + 4h 42' 59" | |
| 43 | Damiano Caruso | Italy | Team Bahrain Victorious | 33 | 17 | + 1h 05' 31" | |
| 44 | Jack Haig | Australia | Team Bahrain Victorious | 27 | 3 | + 7' 40" | |
| 45 | Gino Mäder † | Switzerland | Team Bahrain Victorious | 24 | 5 | + 11' 33" | |
| 46 | Mark Padun † | Ukraine | Team Bahrain Victorious | 25 | 59 | + 3h 09' 46" | |
| 47 | Wout Poels | Netherlands | Team Bahrain Victorious | 33 | 23 | + 1h 34' 52" | |
| 48 | Jan Tratnik | Slovenia | Team Bahrain Victorious | 31 | 94 | + 4h 07' 22" | |
| 51 | Felix Großschartner | Austria | Bora–Hansgrohe | 27 | 10 | + 22' 22" | |
| 52 | Cesare Benedetti | Italy | Bora–Hansgrohe | 34 | 107 | + 4h 30' 10" | |
| 53 | Patrick Gamper † | Austria | Bora–Hansgrohe | 24 | 112 | + 4h 38' 23" | |
| 54 | Martin Laas | Estonia | Bora–Hansgrohe | 27 | 140 | + 6h 00' 28" | |
| 55 | Jordi Meeus † | Belgium | Bora–Hansgrohe | 23 | 139 | + 5h 53' 36" | |
| 56 | Anton Palzer | Germany | Bora–Hansgrohe | 28 | 102 | + 4h 22' 19" | |
| 57 | Maximilian Schachmann | Germany | Bora–Hansgrohe | 27 | DNS-13 | – | |
| 58 | Ben Zwiehoff | Germany | Bora–Hansgrohe | 27 | 47 | + 2h 32' 29" | |
| 61 | Daniel Navarro | Spain | Burgos BH | 38 | 24 | + 1h 37' 26" | |
| 62 | Jetse Bol | Netherlands | Burgos BH | 31 | 71 | + 3h 39' 48" | |
| 63 | Óscar Cabedo | Spain | Burgos BH | 26 | 19 | + 1h 12' 43" | |
| 64 | Carlos Canal † | Spain | Burgos BH | 20 | 106 | + 4h 28' 30" | |
| 65 | Ángel Madrazo | Spain | Burgos BH | 33 | 63 | + 3h 15' 38" | |
| 66 | Ander Okamika | Spain | Burgos BH | 28 | 75 | + 3h 43' 42" | |
| 67 | Diego Rubio | Spain | Burgos BH | 30 | DNF-18 | – | |
| 68 | Pelayo Sánchez † | Spain | Burgos BH | 21 | 84 | + 3h 52' 29" | |
| 71 | Jonathan Lastra | Spain | Caja Rural–Seguros RGA | 28 | DNF-18 | – | |
| 72 | Jon Aberasturi | Spain | Caja Rural–Seguros RGA | 32 | 132 | + 5h 29' 29" | |
| 73 | Julen Amezqueta | Spain | Caja Rural–Seguros RGA | 28 | 43 | + 2h 25' 16" | |
| 74 | Aritz Bagües | Spain | Caja Rural–Seguros RGA | 31 | 87 | + 3h 53' 02" | |
| 75 | Jefferson Alveiro Cepeda † | Ecuador | Caja Rural–Seguros RGA | 25 | 32 | + 1h 58' 54" | |
| 76 | Álvaro Cuadros | Spain | Caja Rural–Seguros RGA | 26 | 78 | + 3h 46' 50" | |
| 77 | Oier Lazkano † | Spain | Caja Rural–Seguros RGA | 21 | DNS-20 | – | |
| 78 | Sergio Martín † | Spain | Caja Rural–Seguros RGA | 24 | DNF-9 | – | |
| 81 | Guillaume Martin | France | Cofidis | 28 | 9 | + 20' 27" | |
| 82 | Piet Allegaert | Belgium | Cofidis | 26 | 123 | + 5h 03' 48" | |
| 83 | Fernando Barceló † | Spain | Cofidis | 25 | 89 | + 3h 55' 36" | |
| 84 | Eddy Finé † | France | Cofidis | 23 | 92 | + 4h 04' 47" | |
| 85 | Jesús Herrada | Spain | Cofidis | 31 | 38 | + 2h 16' 48" | |
| 86 | José Herrada | Spain | Cofidis | 35 | 57 | + 3h 05' 54" | |
| 87 | Emmanuel Morin | France | Cofidis | 26 | DNF-7 | – | |
| 88 | Rémy Rochas † | France | Cofidis | 25 | 15 | + 52' 32" | |
| 91 | Fabio Jakobsen † | Netherlands | Deceuninck–Quick-Step | 24 | 141 | + 6h 01' 24" | |
| 92 | Andrea Bagioli † | Italy | Deceuninck–Quick-Step | 22 | 90 | + 3h 58' 45" | |
| 93 | Josef Černý | Czechia | Deceuninck–Quick-Step | 28 | 142 | + 6h 03' 50" | |
| 94 | James Knox | Great Britain | Deceuninck–Quick-Step | 25 | 100 | + 4h 20' 47" | |
| 95 | Florian Sénéchal | France | Deceuninck–Quick-Step | 28 | 118 | + 4h 48' 14" | |
| 96 | Zdeněk Štybar | Czechia | Deceuninck–Quick-Step | 35 | 133 | + 5h 34' 14" | |
| 97 | Bert Van Lerberghe | Belgium | Deceuninck–Quick-Step | 28 | 137 | + 5h 48' 13" | |
| 98 | Mauri Vansevenant † | Belgium | Deceuninck–Quick-Step | 22 | 101 | + 4h 21' 19" | |
| 101 | Hugh Carthy | Great Britain | EF Education–Nippo | 27 | DNF-7 | – | |
| 102 | Jonathan Caicedo | Ecuador | EF Education–Nippo | 28 | DNS-15 | – | |
| 103 | Diego Camargo † | Colombia | EF Education–Nippo | 23 | 53 | + 2h 53' 47" | |
| 104 | Simon Carr † | Great Britain | EF Education–Nippo | 22 | DNF-11 | – | |
| 105 | Lawson Craddock | United States | EF Education–Nippo | 29 | 69 | + 3h 36' 48" | |
| 106 | Jens Keukeleire | Belgium | EF Education–Nippo | 32 | 50 | + 2h 48' 20" | |
| 107 | Magnus Cort | Denmark | EF Education–Nippo | 28 | 77 | + 3h 46' 48" | |
| 108 | Tom Scully | New Zealand | EF Education–Nippo | 31 | 125 | + 5h 09' 47" | |
| 111 | Mikel Bizkarra | Spain | Euskaltel–Euskadi | 31 | 46 | + 2h 30' 33" | |
| 112 | Xabier Azparren † | Spain | Euskaltel–Euskadi | 22 | 111 | + 4h 36' 40" | |
| 113 | Joan Bou † | Spain | Euskaltel–Euskadi | 24 | 103 | + 4h 22' 43" | |
| 114 | Mikel Iturria | Spain | Euskaltel–Euskadi | 29 | 60 | + 3h 14' 26" | |
| 115 | Juan José Lobato | Spain | Euskaltel–Euskadi | 32 | 136 | + 5h 45' 39" | |
| 116 | Gotzon Martín † | Spain | Euskaltel–Euskadi | 25 | 37 | + 2h 10' 39" | |
| 117 | Luis Ángel Maté | Spain | Euskaltel–Euskadi | 37 | 30 | + 1h 48' 17" | |
| 118 | Antonio Jesús Soto | Spain | Euskaltel–Euskadi | 26 | 81 | + 3h 50' 05" | |
| 121 | Arnaud Démare | France | Groupama–FDJ | 29 | 96 | + 4h 16' 42" | |
| 122 | Kevin Geniets † | Luxembourg | Groupama–FDJ | 24 | 85 | + 3h 52' 41" | |
| 123 | Jacopo Guarnieri | Italy | Groupama–FDJ | 34 | DNF-9 | – | |
| 124 | Olivier Le Gac | France | Groupama–FDJ | 27 | 76 | + 3h 44' 56" | |
| 125 | Tobias Ludvigsson | Sweden | Groupama–FDJ | 30 | 99 | + 4h 19' 24" | |
| 126 | Rudy Molard | France | Groupama–FDJ | 31 | DNF-16 | – | |
| 127 | Anthony Roux | France | Groupama–FDJ | 34 | 58 | + 3h 07' 54" | |
| 128 | Ramon Sinkeldam | Netherlands | Groupama–FDJ | 32 | 127 | + 5h 16' 27" | |
| 131 | Egan Bernal † | Colombia | Ineos Grenadiers | 24 | 6 | + 13' 27" | |
| 132 | Richard Carapaz | Ecuador | Ineos Grenadiers | 28 | DNF-14 | – | |
| 133 | Jhonatan Narváez | Ecuador | Ineos Grenadiers | 24 | DNF-15 | – | |
| 134 | Tom Pidcock † | Great Britain | Ineos Grenadiers | 22 | 67 | + 3h 31' 54" | |
| 135 | Salvatore Puccio | Italy | Ineos Grenadiers | 31 | 98 | + 4h 18' 54" | |
| 136 | Pavel Sivakov † | Russia | Ineos Grenadiers | 24 | 35 | + 2h 04' 47" | |
| 137 | Dylan van Baarle | Netherlands | Ineos Grenadiers | 29 | DNS-18 | – | |
| 138 | Adam Yates | Great Britain | Ineos Grenadiers | 29 | 4 | + 9' 06" | |
| 141 | Louis Meintjes | South Africa | Intermarché–Wanty–Gobert Matériaux | 29 | DNF-19 | – | |
| 142 | Odd Christian Eiking | Norway | Intermarché–Wanty–Gobert Matériaux | 26 | 11 | + 25' 14" | |
| 143 | Jan Hirt | Czechia | Intermarché–Wanty–Gobert Matériaux | 30 | 28 | + 1h 42' 39" | |
| 144 | Wesley Kreder | Netherlands | Intermarché–Wanty–Gobert Matériaux | 30 | 110 | + 4h 34' 38" | |
| 145 | Riccardo Minali | Italy | Intermarché–Wanty–Gobert Matériaux | 26 | 138 | + 5h 50' 15" | |
| 146 | Simone Petilli | Italy | Intermarché–Wanty–Gobert Matériaux | 28 | 29 | + 1h 45' 51" | |
| 147 | Rein Taaramäe | Estonia | Intermarché–Wanty–Gobert Matériaux | 34 | 55 | + 2h 58' 46" | |
| 148 | Kevin Van Melsen | Belgium | Intermarché–Wanty–Gobert Matériaux | 34 | 126 | + 5h 10' 04" | |
| 151 | Sep Vanmarcke | Belgium | Israel Start-Up Nation | 33 | DNF-16 | – | |
| 152 | Sebastian Berwick † | Australia | Israel Start-Up Nation | 21 | 135 | + 5h 37' 10" | |
| 153 | Alexander Cataford | Canada | Israel Start-Up Nation | 27 | DNS-3 | – | |
| 154 | Davide Cimolai | Italy | Israel Start-Up Nation | 32 | DNF-8 | – | |
| 155 | Itamar Einhorn † | Israel | Israel Start-Up Nation | 23 | DNF-17 | – | |
| 156 | Guy Niv | Israel | Israel Start-Up Nation | 27 | 93 | + 4h 06' 37" | |
| 157 | James Piccoli | Canada | Israel Start-Up Nation | 29 | 86 | + 3h 52' 52" | |
| 158 | Mads Würtz Schmidt | Denmark | Israel Start-Up Nation | 27 | DNF-7 | – | |
| 161 | Andreas Kron † | Denmark | Lotto–Soudal | 23 | 68 | + 3h 34' 35" | |
| 162 | Steff Cras † | Belgium | Lotto–Soudal | 25 | 20 | + 1h 22' 06" | |
| 163 | Frederik Frison | Belgium | Lotto–Soudal | 29 | DNS-3 | – | |
| 164 | Matthew Holmes | Great Britain | Lotto–Soudal | 27 | HD-18 | – | |
| 165 | Sylvain Moniquet † | Belgium | Lotto–Soudal | 23 | 83 | + 3h 52' 10" | |
| 166 | Maxim Van Gils † | Belgium | Lotto–Soudal | 21 | 88 | + 3h 53' 55" | |
| 167 | Harm Vanhoucke † | Belgium | Lotto–Soudal | 24 | 115 | + 4h 42' 31" | |
| 168 | Florian Vermeersch † | Belgium | Lotto–Soudal | 22 | 121 | + 4h 57' 09" | |
| 171 | Enric Mas | Spain | Movistar Team | 26 | 2 | + 4' 42" | |
| 172 | Imanol Erviti | Spain | Movistar Team | 37 | 66 | + 3h 28' 24" | |
| 173 | Johan Jacobs † | Switzerland | Movistar Team | 24 | DNF-9 | – | |
| 174 | Miguel Ángel López | Colombia | Movistar Team | 27 | DNF-20 | – | |
| 175 | Nelson Oliveira | Portugal | Movistar Team | 32 | 72 | + 3h 39' 49" | |
| 176 | José Joaquín Rojas | Spain | Movistar Team | 36 | 56 | + 3h 02' 19" | |
| 177 | Alejandro Valverde | Spain | Movistar Team | 41 | DNF-7 | – | |
| 178 | Carlos Verona | Spain | Movistar Team | 28 | DNS-18 | – | |
| 181 | Michael Matthews | Australia | Team BikeExchange | 30 | 70 | + 3h 39' 31" | |
| 182 | Lucas Hamilton † | Australia | Team BikeExchange | 25 | 54 | + 2h 56' 47" | |
| 183 | Damien Howson | Australia | Team BikeExchange | 29 | 95 | + 4h 10' 16" | |
| 184 | Luka Mezgec | Slovenia | Team BikeExchange | 33 | 109 | + 4h 30' 30" | |
| 185 | Mikel Nieve | Spain | Team BikeExchange | 37 | 31 | + 1h 56' 31" | |
| 186 | Nick Schultz | Australia | Team BikeExchange | 26 | 49 | + 2h 39' 13" | |
| 187 | Robert Stannard † | Australia | Team BikeExchange | 22 | 119 | + 4h 48' 56" | |
| 188 | Andrey Zeits | Kazakhstan | Team BikeExchange | 34 | 44 | + 2h 27' 52" | |
| 191 | Romain Bardet | France | Team DSM | 30 | 25 | + 1h 37' 27" | |
| 192 | Thymen Arensman † | Netherlands | Team DSM | 21 | 61 | + 3h 14' 59" | |
| 193 | Alberto Dainese † | Italy | Team DSM | 23 | 129 | + 5h 20' 50" | |
| 194 | Nico Denz | Germany | Team DSM | 27 | 114 | + 4h 42' 09" | |
| 195 | Chad Haga | United States | Team DSM | 32 | 113 | + 4h 38' 46" | |
| 196 | Chris Hamilton | Australia | Team DSM | 26 | 64 | + 3h 18' 33" | |
| 197 | Michael Storer † | Australia | Team DSM | 24 | 40 | + 2h 22' 45" | |
| 198 | Martijn Tusveld | Netherlands | Team DSM | 27 | 34 | + 2h 04' 06" | |
| 201 | Fabio Aru | Italy | Team Qhubeka NextHash | 31 | 51 | + 2h 49' 04" | |
| 202 | Sander Armée | Belgium | Team Qhubeka NextHash | 35 | DNF-17 | – | |
| 203 | Connor Brown † | New Zealand | Team Qhubeka NextHash | 23 | 130 | + 5h 22' 42" | |
| 204 | Dimitri Claeys | Belgium | Team Qhubeka NextHash | 34 | 105 | + 4h 27' 40" | |
| 205 | Sergio Henao | Colombia | Team Qhubeka NextHash | 33 | DNF-19 | – | |
| 206 | Reinardt Janse van Rensburg | South Africa | Team Qhubeka NextHash | 32 | HD-7 | – | |
| 207 | Bert-Jan Lindeman | Netherlands | Team Qhubeka NextHash | 32 | 131 | + 5h 26' 43" | |
| 208 | Dylan Sunderland † | Australia | Team Qhubeka NextHash | 25 | 104 | + 4h 24' 21" | |
| 211 | Giulio Ciccone | Italy | Trek–Segafredo | 26 | DNF-16 | – | |
| 212 | Gianluca Brambilla | Italy | Trek–Segafredo | 33 | 22 | + 1h 22' 38" | |
| 213 | Kenny Elissonde | France | Trek–Segafredo | 30 | DNF-17 | – | |
| 214 | Alex Kirsch | Luxembourg | Trek–Segafredo | 29 | 120 | + 4h 50' 22" | |
| 215 | Juan Pedro López † | Spain | Trek–Segafredo | 24 | 13 | + 31' 21" | |
| 216 | Antonio Nibali | Italy | Trek–Segafredo | 28 | 108 | + 4h 30' 22" | |
| 217 | Kiel Reijnen | United States | Trek–Segafredo | 35 | DNF-15 | – | |
| 218 | Quinn Simmons † | United States | Trek–Segafredo | 20 | 124 | + 5h 06' 02" | |
| 221 | David de la Cruz | Spain | UAE Team Emirates | 32 | 7 | + 18' 33" | |
| 222 | Joe Dombrowski | United States | UAE Team Emirates | 30 | 39 | + 2h 17' 20" | |
| 223 | Ryan Gibbons | South Africa | UAE Team Emirates | 27 | 36 | + 2h 05' 50" | |
| 224 | Rafał Majka | Poland | UAE Team Emirates | 31 | 21 | + 1h 22' 14" | |
| 225 | Juan Sebastián Molano | Colombia | UAE Team Emirates | 26 | DNF-9 | – | |
| 226 | Rui Oliveira † | Portugal | UAE Team Emirates | 24 | 74 | + 3h 42' 10" | |
| 227 | Jan Polanc | Slovenia | UAE Team Emirates | 29 | 41 | + 2h 22' 55" | |
| 228 | Matteo Trentin | Italy | UAE Team Emirates | 32 | 80 | + 3h 47' 40" | |

=== By team ===
Team Jumbo–Visma (TJV)
| No. | Rider | Pos. |
|---|---|---|
| 1 | Primož Roglič (SLO) | 1 |
| 2 | Koen Bouwman (NED) | 42 |
| 3 | Robert Gesink (NED) | 62 |
| 4 | Lennard Hofstede (NED) | 128 |
| 5 | Steven Kruijswijk (NED) | 12 |
| 6 | Sepp Kuss (USA) | 8 |
| 7 | Sam Oomen (NED) | 18 |
| 8 | Nathan Van Hooydonck (BEL) | 82 |

AG2R Citroën Team (ALM)
| No. | Rider | Pos. |
|---|---|---|
| 11 | Geoffrey Bouchard (FRA) | 14 |
| 12 | Lilian Calmejane (FRA) | 33 |
| 13 | Clément Champoussin (FRA) | 16 |
| 14 | Mikaël Cherel (FRA) | 45 |
| 15 | Stan Dewulf (BEL) | 65 |
| 16 | Nicolas Prodhomme (FRA) | 52 |
| 17 | Damien Touzé (FRA) | 79 |
| 18 | Clément Venturini (FRA) | 97 |

Alpecin–Fenix (AFC)
| No. | Rider | Pos. |
|---|---|---|
| 21 | Jay Vine (AUS) | 73 |
| 22 | Tobias Bayer (AUT) | DNF-12 |
| 23 | Floris De Tier (BEL) | 48 |
| 24 | Alexander Krieger (GER) | 117 |
| 25 | Sacha Modolo (ITA) | DNF-19 |
| 26 | Jasper Philipsen (BEL) | DNS-11 |
| 27 | Edward Planckaert (BEL) | 122 |
| 28 | Scott Thwaites (GBR) | 134 |

Astana–Premier Tech (APT)
| No. | Rider | Pos. |
|---|---|---|
| 31 | Aleksandr Vlasov (RUS) | DNS-20 |
| 32 | Alex Aranburu (ESP) | DNS-11 |
| 33 | Omar Fraile (ESP) | DNS-13 |
| 34 | Gorka Izagirre (ESP) | 27 |
| 35 | Ion Izagirre (ESP) | 26 |
| 36 | Yuriy Natarov (KAZ) | 91 |
| 37 | Óscar Rodríguez (ESP) | DNF-7 |
| 38 | Luis León Sánchez (ESP) | DNF-17 |

Team Bahrain Victorious (TBV)
| No. | Rider | Pos. |
|---|---|---|
| 41 | Mikel Landa (ESP) | DNF-17 |
| 42 | Yukiya Arashiro (JPN) | 113 |
| 43 | Damiano Caruso (ITA) | 17 |
| 44 | Jack Haig (AUS) | 3 |
| 45 | Gino Mäder (SUI) | 5 |
| 46 | Mark Padun (UKR) | 59 |
| 47 | Wout Poels (NED) | 23 |
| 48 | Jan Tratnik (SLO) | 94 |

Bora–Hansgrohe (BOH)
| No. | Rider | Pos. |
|---|---|---|
| 51 | Felix Großschartner (AUT) | 10 |
| 52 | Cesare Benedetti (POL) | 107 |
| 53 | Patrick Gamper (AUT) | 112 |
| 54 | Martin Laas (EST) | 140 |
| 55 | Jordi Meeus (BEL) | 139 |
| 56 | Anton Palzer (GER) | 102 |
| 57 | Maximilian Schachmann (GER) | DNS-13 |
| 58 | Ben Zwiehoff (GER) | 47 |

Burgos BH (BBH)
| No. | Rider | Pos. |
|---|---|---|
| 61 | Daniel Navarro (ESP) | 24 |
| 62 | Jetse Bol (NED) | 71 |
| 63 | Óscar Cabedo (ESP) | 19 |
| 64 | Carlos Canal (ESP) | 106 |
| 65 | Ángel Madrazo (ESP) | 63 |
| 66 | Ander Okamika (ESP) | 75 |
| 67 | Diego Rubio (ESP) | DNF-18 |
| 68 | Pelayo Sánchez (ESP) | 84 |

Caja Rural–Seguros RGA (CJR)
| No. | Rider | Pos. |
|---|---|---|
| 71 | Jonathan Lastra (ESP) | DNF-18 |
| 72 | Jon Aberasturi (ESP) | 132 |
| 73 | Julen Amezqueta (ESP) | 43 |
| 74 | Aritz Bagües (ESP) | 87 |
| 75 | Jefferson Alveiro Cepeda (ECU) | 32 |
| 76 | Álvaro Cuadros (ESP) | 78 |
| 77 | Oier Lazkano (ESP) | DNS-20 |
| 78 | Sergio Martín (ESP) | DNF-9 |

Cofidis (COF)
| No. | Rider | Pos. |
|---|---|---|
| 81 | Guillaume Martin (FRA) | 9 |
| 82 | Piet Allegaert (BEL) | 123 |
| 83 | Fernando Barceló (ESP) | 89 |
| 84 | Eddy Finé (FRA) | 92 |
| 85 | Jesús Herrada (ESP) | 38 |
| 86 | José Herrada (ESP) | 57 |
| 87 | Emmanuel Morin (FRA) | DNF-7 |
| 88 | Rémy Rochas (FRA) | 15 |

Deceuninck–Quick-Step (DQT)
| No. | Rider | Pos. |
|---|---|---|
| 91 | Fabio Jakobsen (NED) | 141 |
| 92 | Andrea Bagioli (ITA) | 90 |
| 93 | Josef Černý (CZE) | 142 |
| 94 | James Knox (GBR) | 100 |
| 95 | Florian Sénéchal (FRA) | 118 |
| 96 | Zdeněk Štybar (CZE) | 133 |
| 97 | Bert Van Lerberghe (BEL) | 137 |
| 98 | Mauri Vansevenant (BEL) | 101 |

EF Education–Nippo (EFN)
| No. | Rider | Pos. |
|---|---|---|
| 101 | Hugh Carthy (GBR) | DNF-7 |
| 102 | Jonathan Caicedo (ECU) | DNS-15 |
| 103 | Diego Camargo (COL) | 53 |
| 104 | Simon Carr (GBR) | DNF-11 |
| 105 | Lawson Craddock (USA) | 69 |
| 106 | Jens Keukeleire (BEL) | 50 |
| 107 | Magnus Cort (DEN) | 77 |
| 108 | Tom Scully (NZL) | 125 |

Euskaltel–Euskadi (EUS)
| No. | Rider | Pos. |
|---|---|---|
| 111 | Mikel Bizkarra (ESP) | 46 |
| 112 | Xabier Azparren (ESP) | 111 |
| 113 | Joan Bou (ESP) | 103 |
| 114 | Mikel Iturria (ESP) | 60 |
| 115 | Juan José Lobato (ESP) | 136 |
| 116 | Gotzon Martín (ESP) | 37 |
| 117 | Luis Ángel Maté (ESP) | 30 |
| 118 | Antonio Jesús Soto (ESP) | 81 |

Groupama–FDJ (GFC)
| No. | Rider | Pos. |
|---|---|---|
| 121 | Arnaud Démare (FRA) | 96 |
| 122 | Kevin Geniets (LUX) | 85 |
| 123 | Jacopo Guarnieri (ITA) | DNF-9 |
| 124 | Olivier Le Gac (FRA) | 76 |
| 123 | Tobias Ludvigsson (SWE) | 99 |
| 126 | Rudy Molard (FRA) | DNF-16 |
| 127 | Anthony Roux (FRA) | 58 |
| 128 | Ramon Sinkeldam (NED) | 127 |

Ineos Grenadiers (IGD)
| No. | Rider | Pos. |
|---|---|---|
| 131 | Egan Bernal (COL) | 6 |
| 132 | Richard Carapaz (ECU) | DNF-14 |
| 133 | Jhonatan Narváez (ECU) | DNF-15 |
| 134 | Tom Pidcock (GBR) | 67 |
| 135 | Salvatore Puccio (ITA) | 98 |
| 136 | Pavel Sivakov (RUS) | 35 |
| 137 | Dylan van Baarle (NED) | DNS-18 |
| 138 | Adam Yates (GBR) | 4 |

Intermarché–Wanty–Gobert Matériaux (IWG)
| No. | Rider | Pos. |
|---|---|---|
| 141 | Louis Meintjes (RSA) | DNF-19 |
| 142 | Odd Christian Eiking (NOR) | 11 |
| 143 | Jan Hirt (CZE) | 28 |
| 144 | Wesley Kreder (NED) | 110 |
| 145 | Riccardo Minali (ITA) | 138 |
| 146 | Simone Petilli (ITA) | 29 |
| 147 | Rein Taaramäe (EST) | 55 |
| 148 | Kevin Van Melsen (BEL) | 126 |

Israel Start-Up Nation (ISN)
| No. | Rider | Pos. |
|---|---|---|
| 151 | Sep Vanmarcke (BEL) | DNF-16 |
| 152 | Sebastian Berwick (AUS) | 135 |
| 153 | Alexander Cataford (CAN) | DNS-3 |
| 154 | Davide Cimolai (ITA) | DNF-8 |
| 155 | Itamar Einhorn (ISR) | DNF-17 |
| 156 | Guy Niv (ISR) | 93 |
| 157 | James Piccoli (CAN) | 86 |
| 158 | Mads Würtz Schmidt (DEN) | DNF-7 |

Lotto–Soudal (LTS)
| No. | Rider | Pos. |
|---|---|---|
| 161 | Andreas Kron (DEN) | 68 |
| 162 | Steff Cras (BEL) | 20 |
| 163 | Frederik Frison (BEL) | DNS-3 |
| 164 | Matthew Holmes (GBR) | HD-18 |
| 165 | Sylvain Moniquet (BEL) | 83 |
| 166 | Maxim Van Gils (BEL) | 88 |
| 167 | Harm Vanhoucke (BEL) | 115 |
| 168 | Florian Vermeersch (BEL) | 121 |

Movistar Team (MOV)
| No. | Rider | Pos. |
|---|---|---|
| 171 | Enric Mas (ESP) | 2 |
| 172 | Imanol Erviti (ESP) | 66 |
| 173 | Johan Jacobs (SUI) | DNF-9 |
| 174 | Miguel Ángel López (COL) | DNF-20 |
| 175 | Nelson Oliveira (POR) | 72 |
| 176 | José Joaquín Rojas (ESP) | 56 |
| 177 | Alejandro Valverde (ESP) | DNF-7 |
| 178 | Carlos Verona (ESP) | DNS-18 |

Team BikeExchange (BEX)
| No. | Rider | Pos. |
|---|---|---|
| 181 | Michael Matthews (AUS) | 70 |
| 182 | Lucas Hamilton (AUS) | 54 |
| 183 | Damien Howson (AUS) | 95 |
| 184 | Luka Mezgec (SLO) | 109 |
| 185 | Mikel Nieve (ESP) | 31 |
| 186 | Nick Schultz (AUS) | 49 |
| 187 | Robert Stannard (AUS) | 119 |
| 188 | Andrey Zeits (KAZ) | 44 |

Team DSM (DSM)
| No. | Rider | Pos. |
|---|---|---|
| 191 | Romain Bardet (FRA) | 25 |
| 192 | Thymen Arensman (NED) | 61 |
| 193 | Alberto Dainese (ITA) | 129 |
| 194 | Nico Denz (GER) | 114 |
| 195 | Chad Haga (USA) | 113 |
| 196 | Chris Hamilton (AUS) | 64 |
| 197 | Michael Storer (AUS) | 40 |
| 198 | Martijn Tusveld (NED) | 34 |

Team Qhubeka NextHash (TQA)
| No. | Rider | Pos. |
|---|---|---|
| 201 | Fabio Aru (ITA) | 51 |
| 202 | Sander Armée (BEL) | DNF-17 |
| 203 | Connor Brown (NZL) | 130 |
| 204 | Dimitri Claeys (BEL) | 105 |
| 205 | Sergio Henao (COL) | DNF-19 |
| 206 | Reinardt Janse van Rensburg (RSA) | HD-7 |
| 207 | Bert-Jan Lindeman (NED) | 131 |
| 208 | Dylan Sunderland (AUS) | 104 |

Trek–Segafredo (TFS)
| No. | Rider | Pos. |
|---|---|---|
| 211 | Giulio Ciccone (ITA) | DNF-16 |
| 212 | Gianluca Brambilla (ITA) | 22 |
| 213 | Kenny Elissonde (FRA) | DNF-17 |
| 214 | Alex Kirsch (LUX) | 120 |
| 215 | Juan Pedro López (ESP) | 13 |
| 216 | Antonio Nibali (ITA) | 108 |
| 217 | Kiel Reijnen (USA) | DNF-15 |
| 218 | Quinn Simmons (USA) | 124 |

UAE Team Emirates (UAD)
| No. | Rider | Pos. |
|---|---|---|
| 221 | David de la Cruz (ESP) | 7 |
| 222 | Joe Dombrowski (USA) | 39 |
| 223 | Ryan Gibbons (RSA) | 36 |
| 224 | Rafał Majka (POL) | 21 |
| 225 | Juan Sebastián Molano (COL) | DNF-9 |
| 226 | Rui Oliveira (POR) | 74 |
| 227 | Jan Polanc (SLO) | 41 |
| 228 | Matteo Trentin (ITA) | 80 |

=== By nationality ===
| Country | No. of riders | In competition | Stage wins |
|---|---|---|---|
| Australia | 11 | 11 | 2 (Michael Storer x2) |
| Austria | 3 | 2 | |
| Belgium | 20 | 16 | 2 (Jasper Philipsen x2) |
| Canada | 2 | 1 | |
| Colombia | 5 | 2 | 1 (Miguel Ángel López) |
| Czechia | 3 | 3 | |
| Denmark | 3 | 2 | 3 (Magnus Cort x3) |
| Ecuador | 4 | 1 | |
| Estonia | 2 | 2 | 1 (Rein Taaramäe) |
| France | 18 | 15 | 3 (Romain Bardet, Clément Champoussin, Florian Sénéchal) |
| Germany | 5 | 4 | |
| Great Britain | 7 | 4 | |
| Israel | 2 | 1 | |
| Italy | 15 | 11 | 1 (Damiano Caruso) |
| Japan | 1 | 1 | |
| Kazakhstan | 2 | 2 | |
| Luxembourg | 2 | 2 | |
| Netherlands | 14 | 13 | 3 (Fabio Jakobsen x3) |
| New Zealand | 2 | 2 | |
| Norway | 1 | 1 | |
| Poland | 2 | 2 | 1 (Rafał Majka) |
| Portugal | 2 | 2 | |
| Russia | 2 | 1 | |
| Slovenia | 4 | 4 | 4 (Primož Roglič x4) |
| South Africa | 3 | 1 | |
| Spain | 40 | 29 | |
| Sweden | 1 | 1 | |
| Switzerland | 2 | 1 | |
| Ukraine | 1 | 1 | |
| United States | 6 | 5 | |
| Total | 184 | 142 | 21 |
