= 2022 Route d'Occitanie =

2022 UCI Europe Tour

Race details
- Dates: 16–19 June 2022
- Stages: 4
- Distance: 585.7 km (363.9 mi)
- Winning time: 14h 33' 48"

Results
Jersey awarded to the overall winner	Winner	Michael Woods (CAN)	(Israel–Premier Tech)
	Second	Carlos Rodríguez (ESP)	(Ineos Grenadiers)
	Third	Jesús Herrada (ESP)	(Cofidis)
Jersey awarded to the points classification winner	Points	Max Kanter (GER)	(Movistar Team)
Jersey awarded to the mountains classification winner	Mountains	Winner Anacona (COL)	(Arkéa–Samsic)
Jersey awarded to the youth classification winner	Youth	Carlos Rodríguez (ESP)	(Ineos Grenadiers)

The 2022 Route d'Occitanie (known as the La Route d'Occitanie - La Dépêche du Midi for sponsorship reasons) is a road cycling stage race that took place between 16 and 19 June 2022 in the southern French region of Occitanie. The race is the 46th edition of the Route d'Occitanie and is rated as a category 2.1 event on the 2022 UCI Europe Tour.

== Teams ==
Nine UCI WorldTeams, seven UCI ProTeams, and five UCI Continental made up the twenty-one teams that participated in the race.

UCI WorldTeams

- AG2R Citroën Team
- Astana Qazaqstan Team
- Cofidis
- EF Education–EasyPost
- Groupama–FDJ
- Ineos Grenadiers
- Israel–Premier Tech
- Movistar Team
- Trek–Segafredo

UCI ProTeams

- Arkéa–Samsic
- Burgos BH
- B&B Hotels–KTM
- Caja Rural–Seguros RGA
- Equipo Kern Pharma
- Team TotalEnergies
- Uno-X Pro Cycling Team

UCI Continental Teams

- Electro Hiper Europa–Caldas
- Go Sport–Roubaix–Lille Métropole
- Nice Métropole Côte d'Azur
- St. Michel–Auber93
- Team UC Nantes Atlantique

== Route ==
Stage characteristics and winners
Stage	Date	Course	Distance	Type	Stage winner
1	16 June	Séméac to L'Isle-Jourdain	174.4 km (108.4 mi)	Flat stage	Arnaud Démare (FRA)
2	17 June	~~Graulhet~~ Belmont-sur-Rance to Roquefort-sur-Soulzon	34.3 km (21.3 mi) (Note: Distance originally was 154.6 km, but the distance was shortened to 34.3 km due to a heatwave.)	Hilly stage	Roger Adrià (ESP)
3	18 June	Sigean to Les Angles	188.7 km (117.3 mi)	Mountain stage	Michael Woods (CAN)
4	19 June	Les Angles to Auterive	188.3 km (117.0 mi)	Hilly stage	Niccolò Bonifazio (ITA)
Total			585.7 km (363.9 mi)		

== Stages ==
=== Stage 1 ===
16 June 2022 – Séméac to L'Isle-Jourdain, 174.4 km (108.4 mi)

Stage 1 Result
Rank	Rider	Team	Time
1	Arnaud Démare (FRA)	Groupama–FDJ	4h 13' 55"
2	Pierre Barbier (FRA)	B&B Hotels–KTM	+ 0"
3	Elia Viviani (ITA)	Ineos Grenadiers	+ 0"
4	Thomas Boudat (FRA)	Go Sport–Roubaix–Lille Métropole	+ 0"
5	Max Kanter (GER)	Movistar Team	+ 0"
6	Davide Cimolai (ITA)	Cofidis	+ 0"
7	Niccolò Bonifazio (ITA)	Team TotalEnergies	+ 0"
8	Léo Bouvier (FRA)	Bike Aid	+ 0"
9	Andrea Vendrame (ITA)	AG2R Citroën Team	+ 0"
10	Jon Aberasturi (ESP)	Trek–Segafredo	+ 0"

General classification after Stage 1
Rank	Rider	Team	Time
1	Arnaud Démare (FRA)	Groupama–FDJ	4h 13' 45"
2	Pierre Barbier (FRA)	B&B Hotels–KTM	+ 4"
3	Elia Viviani (ITA)	Ineos Grenadiers	+ 6"
4	Jean Goubert (FRA)	Nice Métropole Côte d'Azur	+ 8"
5	Thomas Boudat (FRA)	Go Sport–Roubaix–Lille Métropole	+ 10"
6	Max Kanter (GER)	Movistar Team	+ 10"
7	Davide Cimolai (ITA)	Cofidis	+ 10"
8	Niccolò Bonifazio (ITA)	Team TotalEnergies	+ 10"
9	Léo Bouvier (FRA)	Bike Aid	+ 10"
10	Andrea Vendrame (ITA)	AG2R Citroën Team	+ 10"

=== Stage 2 ===
17 June 2022 – ~~Graulhet~~ Belmont-sur-Rance to Roquefort-sur-Soulzon, 34.3 km (21.3 mi)

Stage 2 Result
Rank	Rider	Team	Time
1	Roger Adrià (ESP)	Equipo Kern Pharma	42' 42"
2	Michael Valgren (DEN)	EF Education–EasyPost	+ 0"
3	Julien Simon (FRA)	Team TotalEnergies	+ 0"
4	Max Kanter (GER)	Movistar Team	+ 0"
5	Axel Mariault (FRA)	Team UC Nantes Atlantique	+ 0"
6	Michael Woods (CAN)	Israel–Premier Tech	+ 0"
7	Filippo Baroncini (ITA)	Trek–Segafredo	+ 0"
8	Jonas Gregaard (DEN)	Uno-X Pro Cycling Team	+ 0"
9	Odd Christian Eiking (NOR)	EF Education–EasyPost	+ 0"
10	Andrea Vendrame (ITA)	AG2R Citroën Team	+ 0"

General classification after Stage 2
Rank	Rider	Team	Time
1	Roger Adrià (ESP)	Equipo Kern Pharma	4h 56' 27"
2	Arnaud Démare (FRA)	Groupama–FDJ	+ 0"
3	Michael Valgren (DEN)	EF Education–EasyPost	+ 4"
4	Julien Simon (FRA)	Team TotalEnergies	+ 6"
5	Max Kanter (GER)	Movistar Team	+ 10"
6	Andrea Vendrame (ITA)	AG2R Citroën Team	+ 10"
7	Óscar Pelegrí (ESP)	Burgos BH	+ 10"
8	Nairo Quintana (COL)	Arkéa–Samsic	+ 10"
9	Cyril Barthe (FRA)	B&B Hotels–KTM	+ 10"
10	Valentin Paret-Peintre (FRA)	AG2R Citroën Team	+ 10"

=== Stage 3 ===
18 June 2022 – Sigean to Les Angles, 188.7 km (117.3 mi)

Stage 3 Result
Rank	Rider	Team	Time
1	Michael Woods (CAN)	Israel–Premier Tech	5h 23' 35"
2	Carlos Rodríguez (ESP)	Ineos Grenadiers	+ 1' 11"
3	Jesús Herrada (ESP)	Cofidis	+ 1' 12"
4	Alejandro Valverde (ESP)	Movistar Team	+ 1' 12"
5	Mattias Skjelmose Jensen (DEN)	Trek–Segafredo	+ 1' 34"
6	Odd Christian Eiking (NOR)	EF Education–EasyPost	+ 1' 35"
7	Jonas Gregaard (DEN)	Uno-X Pro Cycling Team	+ 1' 35"
8	Nairo Quintana (COL)	Arkéa–Samsic	+ 1' 35"
9	Cristián Rodríguez (ESP)	Team TotalEnergies	+ 1' 35"
10	Michel Ries (LUX)	Arkéa–Samsic	+ 2' 26"

General classification after Stage 3
Rank	Rider	Team	Time
1	Michael Woods (CAN)	Israel–Premier Tech	10h 19' 59"
2	Carlos Rodríguez (ESP)	Ineos Grenadiers	+ 1' 16"
3	Jesús Herrada (ESP)	Cofidis	+ 1' 21"
4	Alejandro Valverde (ESP)	Movistar Team	+ 1' 24"
5	Mattias Skjelmose Jensen (DEN)	Trek–Segafredo	+ 1' 47"
6	Nairo Quintana (COL)	Arkéa–Samsic	+ 1' 48"
7	Odd Christian Eiking (NOR)	EF Education–EasyPost	+ 1' 48"
8	Jonas Gregaard (DEN)	Uno-X Pro Cycling Team	+ 1' 48"
9	Cristián Rodríguez (ESP)	Team TotalEnergies	+ 1' 48"
10	Nicolas Edet (FRA)	Arkéa–Samsic	+ 2' 39"

=== Stage 4 ===
19 June 2022 – Les Angles to Auterive, 188.3 km (117.0 mi)

Stage 4 Result
Rank	Rider	Team	Time
1	Niccolò Bonifazio (ITA)	Team TotalEnergies	4h 13' 49"
2	Matteo Moschetti (ITA)	Trek–Segafredo	+ 0"
3	Max Kanter (GER)	Movistar Team	+ 0"
4	Elia Viviani (ITA)	Ineos Grenadiers	+ 0"
5	Thomas Boudat (FRA)	Go Sport–Roubaix–Lille Métropole	+ 0"
6	Mattias Skjelmose Jensen (DEN)	Trek–Segafredo	+ 0"
7	Alejandro Valverde (ESP)	Movistar Team	+ 0"
8	Jonas Gregaard (DEN)	Uno-X Pro Cycling Team	+ 0"
9	Jesus Herrada (ESP)	Cofidis	+ 0"
10	Kim Heiduk (GER)	Ineos Grenadiers	+ 0"

General classification after Stage 4
Rank	Rider	Team	Time
1	Michael Woods (CAN)	Israel–Premier Tech	14h 33' 48"
2	Carlos Rodríguez (ESP)	Ineos Grenadiers	+ 1' 16"
3	Jesús Herrada (ESP)	Cofidis	+ 1' 21"
4	Alejandro Valverde (ESP)	Movistar Team	+ 1' 24"
5	Mattias Skjelmose Jensen (DEN)	Trek–Segafredo	+ 1' 44"
6	Jonas Gregaard (DEN)	Uno-X Pro Cycling Team	+ 1' 47"
7	Nairo Quintana (COL)	Arkéa–Samsic	+ 1' 48"
8	Cristián Rodríguez (ESP)	Team TotalEnergies	+ 1' 48"
9	Nicolas Edet (FRA)	Arkéa–Samsic	+ 3' 41"
10	Andrey Zeits (KAZ)	Astana Qazaqstan Team	+ 4' 48"

== Classification leadership table ==
Classification leadership by stage
Stage	Winner	General classification	Points classification	Mountains classification	Young rider classification	Team classification	Combativity award
1	Arnaud Démare	Arnaud Démare	Arnaud Démare	Jean Goubert	Pierre Barbier	AG2R Citroën Team	Óscar Cabedo
2	Roger Adrià	Roger Adrià	Max Kanter	Alan Jousseaume	Roger Adrià	AG2R Citroën Team	Niki Terpstra
3	Michael Woods	Michael Woods	Michael Woods	Michael Woods	Carlos Rodríguez	Arkéa–Samsic	Igor Arrieta
4	Niccolò Bonifazio	Michael Woods	Max Kanter	Winner Anacona	Carlos Rodríguez	Arkéa–Samsic	Winner Anacona
Final		Michael Woods	Max Kanter	Winner Anacona	Carlos Rodríguez	Arkéa–Samsic	

== Classification standings ==
Legend
Denotes the leader of the general classification	Denotes the leader of the mountains classification
Denotes the leader of the points classification	Denotes the leader of the young rider classification

=== General classification ===
Final general classification (1–10)
Rank	Rider	Team	Time
1	Michael Woods (CAN)	Israel–Premier Tech	14h 33' 48"
2	Carlos Rodríguez (ESP)	Ineos Grenadiers	+ 1' 16"
3	Jesús Herrada (ESP)	Cofidis	+ 1' 21"
4	Alejandro Valverde (ESP)	Movistar Team	+ 1' 24"
5	Mattias Skjelmose Jensen (DEN)	Trek–Segafredo	+ 1' 44"
6	Jonas Gregaard (DEN)	Uno-X Pro Cycling Team	+ 1' 47"
7	Nairo Quintana (COL)	Arkéa–Samsic	+ 1' 48"
8	Cristián Rodríguez (ESP)	Team TotalEnergies	+ 1' 48"
9	Nicolas Edet (FRA)	Arkéa–Samsic	+ 3' 41"
10	Andrey Zeits (KAZ)	Astana Qazaqstan Team	+ 4' 48"

=== Points classification ===
Final points classification (1–10)
Rank	Rider	Team	Points
1	Max Kanter (GER)	Movistar Team	38
2	Michael Woods (CAN)	Israel–Premier Tech	29
3	Elia Viviani (ITA)	Ineos Grenadiers	28
4	Niccolò Bonifazio (ITA)	Team TotalEnergies	27
5	Thomas Boudat (FRA)	Go Sport–Roubaix–Lille Métropole	23
6	Roger Adrià (ESP)	Equipo Kern Pharma	20
7	Arnaud Démare (FRA)	Groupama–FDJ	20
8	Mattias Skjelmose Jensen (DEN)	Trek–Segafredo	20
9	Carlos Rodríguez (ESP)	Ineos Grenadiers	17
10	Matteo Moschetti (ITA)	Trek–Segafredo	17

=== Mountains classification ===
Final mountains classification (1–10)
Rank	Rider	Team	Points
1	Winner Anacona (COL)	Arkéa–Samsic	25
2	Michael Woods (CAN)	Israel–Premier Tech	17
3	Carlos Rodríguez (ESP)	Ineos Grenadiers	16
4	Igor Arrieta (ESP)	Equipo Kern Pharma	12
5	Nairo Quintana (COL)	Arkéa–Samsic	11
6	Niccolò Bonifazio (ITA)	Team TotalEnergies	11
7	Michel Ries (LUX)	Arkéa–Samsic	10
8	Cristián Rodríguez (ESP)	Team TotalEnergies	8
9	Carl Fredrik Hagen (NOR)	Israel–Premier Tech	7
10	Laurens de Plus (BEL)	Ineos Grenadiers	7

=== Young rider classification ===
Final young rider classification (1–10)
Rank	Rider	Team	Time
1	Carlos Rodríguez (ESP)	Ineos Grenadiers	14h 35' 04"
2	Mattias Skjelmose Jensen (DEN)	Trek–Segafredo	+ 28"
3	Jonas Gregaard (DEN)	Uno-X Pro Cycling Team	+ 31"
4	Michel Ries (LUX)	Arkéa–Samsic	+ 6' 29"
5	Roger Adrià (ESP)	Equipo Kern Pharma	+ 8' 34"
6	Filippo Baroncini (ITA)	Trek–Segafredo	+ 12' 16"
7	Louis Richard (FRA)	Team UC Nantes Atlantique	+ 13' 10"
8	Jordan Jegat (FRA)	Team UC Nantes Atlantique	+ 13' 18"
9	Jacob Hindsgaul Madsen (DEN)	Uno-X Pro Cycling Team	+ 13' 24"
10	Asbjørn Hellemose (DEN)	Trek–Segafredo	+ 13' 56"

=== Team classification ===
Final team classification (1–10)
Rank	Team	Time
1	Arkéa–Samsic	43h 49' 32"
2	Ineos Grenadiers	+ 9' 59"
3	Trek–Segafredo	+ 15' 22"
4	Team TotalEnergies	+ 27' 05"
5	Movistar Team	+ 28' 21"
6	Astana Qazaqstan Team	+ 32' 15"
7	Uno-X Pro Cycling Team	+ 33' 27"
8	Team UC Nantes Atlantique	+ 36' 17"
9	Cofidis	+ 36' 40"
10	Burgos BH	+ 44' 54"
