= 2021 Vuelta a Murcia =

2021 UCI Europe Tour

Race details
- Dates: 23 May 2021
- Distance: 192.4 km (119.6 mi)
- Winning time: 4h 42' 10"

Results
	Winner	Antonio Jesús Soto (ESP)	(Euskaltel–Euskadi)
	Second	Ángel Madrazo (ESP)	(Burgos BH)
	Third	Gonzalo Serrano (ESP)	(Movistar Team)

The 2021 Vuelta a Murcia was the 41st edition of the Vuelta a Murcia road cycling race. It was held on 23 May 2021 in the titular region of southeastern Spain as a category 1.1 event on the 2021 UCI Europe Tour calendar. Due to the COVID-19 pandemic, the race was postponed from mid-February to late May. As a result, the race reverted to the one-day nature it had previously held before 2019.

The 192.4-kilometre (119.6 mi) long race started in Los Alcázares and finished in Alcantarilla. It was won by Alcantarilla-born Antonio Jesús Soto (Euskaltel–Euskadi), who was part of the race's initial breakaway. During the rain-soaked race, Soto dropped his breakaway companions on the last climb and soloed to victory, his first ever as a professional. The chasing bunch finished just over half a minute after Soto, with Ángel Madrazo (Burgos BH) winning the sprint for second ahead of Gonzalo Serrano (Movistar Team), who rounded out the podium.

== Teams ==
Three UCI WorldTeams, seven UCI ProTeams, and five UCI Continental teams made up the fifteen teams that participated in the race. Nine teams each fielded seven riders, which was the maximum allowed, while six teams each fielded six; these six teams were Bahrain Cycling Academy, Electro Hiper Europa, Equipo Kern Pharma, Gazprom–RusVelo, Rally Cycling, and UAE Team Emirates. Of the 100 riders to start the race, only 46 finished, with a further 17 riders finishing over the time limit.

UCI WorldTeams

- Astana–Premier Tech
- Movistar Team
- UAE Team Emirates

UCI ProTeams

- B&B Hotels p/b KTM
- Caja Rural–Seguros RGA
- Equipo Kern Pharma
- Euskaltel–Euskadi
- Gazprom–RusVelo
- Rally Cycling
- Sport Vlaanderen–Baloise

UCI Continental Teams

- Bahrain Cycling Academy
- Electro Hiper Europa
- Gios
- Global 6 Cycling
- Louletano–Loulé Concelho

== Results ==
Result
Rank	Rider	Team	Time
1	Antonio Jesús Soto (ESP)	Euskaltel–Euskadi	4h 42' 10"
2	Ángel Madrazo (ESP)	Burgos BH	+ 31"
3	Gonzalo Serrano (ESP)	Movistar Team	+ 31"
4	José Joaquín Rojas (ESP)	Movistar Team	+ 31"
5	Ryan Gibbons (RSA)	UAE Team Emirates	+ 31"
6	Jesús Ezquerra (ESP)	Burgos BH	+ 31"
7	Carlos Canal (ESP)	Burgos BH	+ 31"
8	Gotzon Martín (ESP)	Euskaltel–Euskadi	+ 31"
9	Jonas Gregaard (DEN)	Astana–Premier Tech	+ 31"
10	Unai Cuadrado (ESP)	Euskaltel–Euskadi	+ 31"
