= Retamosa =

Coordinates: 39°34′17″N 5°32′27″W

Retamosa de Cabañas, Spain
- Interactive map of Retamosa de Cabañas, Spain
- Country: Spain
- Autonomous community: Extremadura
- Province: Cáceres
- Comarca: Las Villuercas
- Municipality: Cabañas del Castillo
- Elevation: 615 m (2,018 ft)

Population (2010)
  - Total: 48

Retamosa de Cabañas, better known just as Retamosa, is a village belonging to the Cabañas del Castillo municipality, located in the province of Cáceres, in the autonomous community of Extremadura, Spain. According to the 2010 census (INE), the village had a population of 48 inhabitants.
