= Robledollano =

- municipality
- Flag Coat of arms

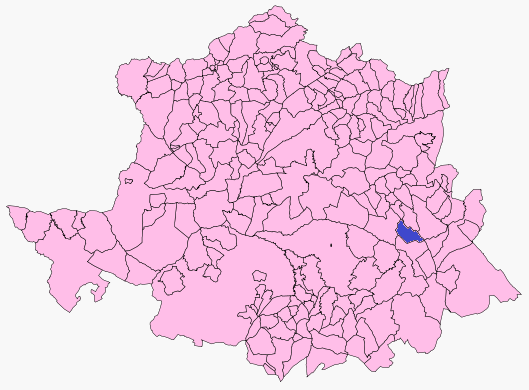
- Coordinates: 39°36′N 5°30′W
- Country: Spain
- Autonomous community: Extremadura
- Province: Cáceres
- Comarca: Las Villuercas

Government
  - Mayor: Antonio Mateos García

Area
  - Total: 61.74 km^{2} (23.84 sq mi)
- Elevation: 710 m (2,330 ft)

Population (2025-01-01)
  - Total: 325
  - Density: 5.26/km^{2} (13.6/sq mi)
- Time zone: UTC+1 (CET)
  - Summer (DST): UTC+2 (CEST)

Robledollano is a municipality located in the province of Cáceres, Extremadura, Spain. According to the 2006 census (INE), the municipality has a population of 403 inhabitants.

== See also ==
- List of municipalities in Cáceres
