= Logrosán =

- Municipality
- Flag Coat of arms

- Location in Spain
- Coordinates: 39°20′14″N 5°29′32″W
- Country: Spain
- Autonomous community: Extremadura
- Province: Cáceres
- Comarca: Las Villuercas
- Founded: Tartessos

Government
  - Alcalde: Juan Carlos Hernández Martinez (2015) (PSOE)

Area
  - Total: 365.3 km^{2} (141.0 sq mi)
- Elevation: 477 m (1,565 ft)

Population (2025-01-01)
  - Total: 1,852
  - Density: 5.070/km^{2} (13.13/sq mi)
- Demonym(s): Logrosano/a, Logrosaniego/a
- Time zone: UTC+1 (CET)
  - Summer (DST): UTC+2 (CEST)
- Postal code: 10120
- Website: Official website

Logrosán (Spanish pronunciation: [loɣɾoˈsan]) is a municipality in the province of Cáceres, in the autonomous community of Extremadura, Spain. It forms part of the administrative and commercial area of Don Benito–Villanueva de la Serena. Historically, Logrosán was an important mining centre, particularly during the 19th and 20th centuries, when mining contributed to significant population growth and the municipality had more than 8,000 inhabitants. Its population has since declined substantially. The municipality is governed by the Logrosán City Council.

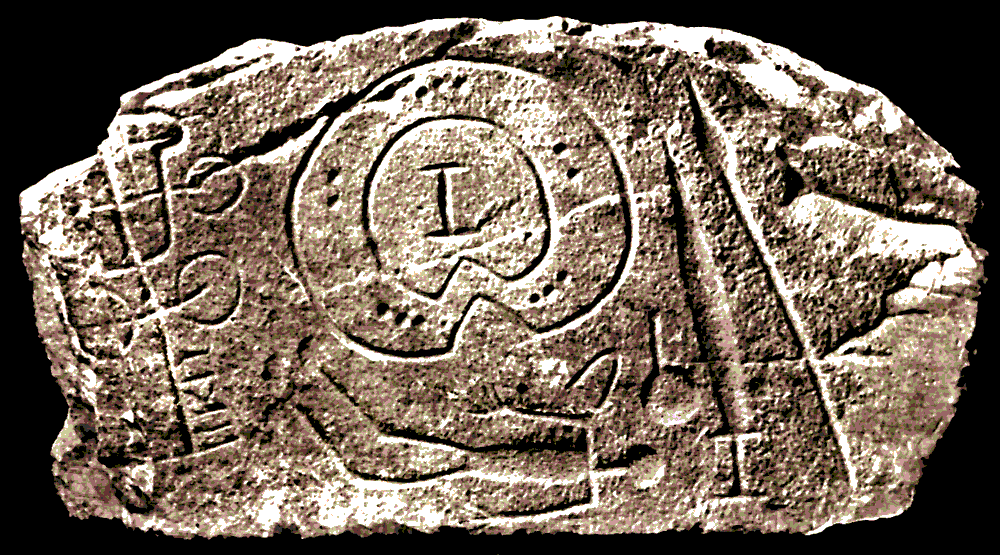
Logrosán stele.

== Geography ==
Geographically, Logrosán is located in the southern part of the province of Cáceres, in Extremadura, Spain. The municipality lies at the foot of Las Villuercas, a mountainous area within the Montes de Toledo. The town is situated on the edge of a granite batholith known as Cerro de San Cristóbal, which was exposed during the Quaternary period. The surrounding landscape also contains outcrops of quartzite and slate, forming a rugged landscape with geological features comparable to those found in the Appalachian region.

The Las Vegas del Guadiana Greenway terminates in the area.

== Economy ==
Logrosán's economy is primarily based on the primary and tertiary sectors. Agriculture in the surrounding area is predominantly extensive, with relatively low profitability and limited employment opportunities. The municipality has little large-scale industrial activity.

The tertiary sector includes public administration, commerce, and hospitality, which provide a significant share of local employment and services. Income levels in Logrosán have historically been below the regional average.

Despite the limited industrial base, Logrosán serves as a local administrative and service centre for the surrounding area. The municipality provides various administrative and educational services, contributing to its role as a regional centre.

== Monuments ==
Chapel of the Virgin of Consuelo: The Chapel of the Virgin of Consuelo is located on a hill overlooking Logrosán. Its dome is notable for its lanterns, while the interior contains an image of the Virgin Mary. The chapel offers views over the surrounding dehesa and holm oak forests, which extend toward the neighbouring province of Badajoz.

Park of the Alcornocal: The Park of the Alcornocal is a wooded area in the western part of the municipality, characterized by mature cork oak trees. During the 1970s, the area was developed as a municipal park. It now contains sports facilities, swimming pools, a children's playground, and a house of culture, and is used for recreational activities, particularly during the summer.

The Green Route: The Green Route consists of roads and natural footpaths passing through fields and pastures around Logrosán. The route was promoted during the tenure of former mayor Manuel González and has become one of the area's recreational and tourist attractions. It provides views of the surrounding countryside of Extremadura.

Hill of St. Kitts: The Hill of St. Kitts (Cerro de San Cristóbal) is associated with the early settlement of Logrosán. Archaeological remains and ancient paths have been identified in the area, although relatively little research has been published concerning the earliest settlements on the hill.

== Other places of interest ==
The Helechal: The place where elderly women would wash clothing. Despite being a place of deep traditions and beauty, it is not a popular visit destination today.

The Well Be quiet: The only local monument to the region's mining past.

The train station: A homage to the improvisation and the waste of the past, and to the abandonment and the apathy of the present (fed by the lack of organization between the administrations). Today it shows a promising future with the construction of the Green Route, although the station buildings are not going to face refurbishment for the time being.

The Roman Bridge: Despite its title, the Roman bridge is not, in fact, Roman. It is a medieval era construction, and represents the historical origin of the area as a whole.

Stately houses: The town is filled with them. They are representative of the region's past social structure: workers, landowners, and nobility up to the rank of count. The majority of the houses formerly belonged to wealthy families and were built to include Artesonados (Wooden roof with decorative patterns), stone staircases, wide brokers, courts, and corrals. However, many are currently in a state of ruin due to neglect.

Costanza mine: This mine is part of the Minas de Logrosán project, which restores former mines so that the public can learn about the mining heritage of the area, which has been active since prehistoric times.

== Notable people ==
- Mario Roso de Luna, theosophist and atheneites.
- Martín del Barco Centenera, poet and chronicler of the American conquest.

== See also ==
- List of municipalities in Cáceres
