= Cabañas del Castillo =

Coordinates: 39°33′N 5°30′W

Cabañas del Castillo, Spain
- municipality
- Coat of arms

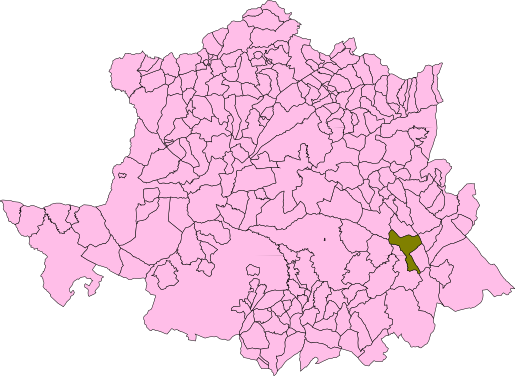
- Country: Spain
- Autonomous community: Extremadura
- Province: Cáceres
- Comarca: Las Villuercas

Area
  - Total: 105 km^{2} (41 sq mi)

Population (2025-01-01)
  - Total: 406
  - Density: 3.87/km^{2} (10.0/sq mi)
- Time zone: UTC+1 (CET)
  - Summer (DST): UTC+2 (CEST)

Cabañas del Castillo is a municipality located in the province of Cáceres, Extremadura, Spain. According to the 2006 census (INE), the municipality has a population of 477 inhabitants.

== Villages ==
- Solana de Cabañas
- Retamosa de Cabañas
- Roturas de Cabañas

== See also ==
- List of municipalities in Cáceres
