= Mario Roso de Luna =

Mario Roso de Luna (March 15, 1872, in Logrosán – November 15, 1931, in Madrid) was a Spanish lawyer, astronomer, writer, inventor, linguist, astrophysicist, journalist, geologist, archaeologist, translator, theosophist and freemason.

== Career ==
Known as the "Red Magician of Logrosán", Roso liked to define himself as a "Theosophist" and an "Ateneist", relating to his membership in the Ateneo de Madrid, together with other important figures of the period, such as Miguel de Unamuno and Ramón María del Valle-Inclán.

As a Theosophist he realized a tremendous amount of educative work. He translated all of Helena Blavatsky's work to Spanish and wrote a large set of his own books.

In his books Roso applies theosophical ideas to many subjects, such as musicology (Beethoven, teósofo; Wagner, mitólogo y ocultista), One Thousand and One Nights (El velo de Isis), totalitarianism (La humanidad y los césares), sexology (Aberraciones psíquicas del sexo), precolombine myths (La ciencia hierática de los mayas) and spanish folklore (El libro que mata a la muerte).

In 1928 he founded, together with Eduardo Alfonso, the Schola Philosophicae Initiationis.

== Death ==
He died in November, 1931, of an unknown disease. His last words were said to have been "No man is indispensable. Don't cry over me. The only way you can honor my memory is to continue my work! Exceed it!"
