= Las Villuercas =

Coordinates: 39°20′N 5°29′W

- Comarca
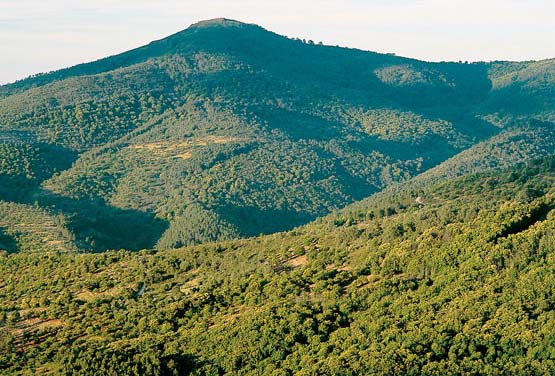
- Sierra de las Villuercas mountains.

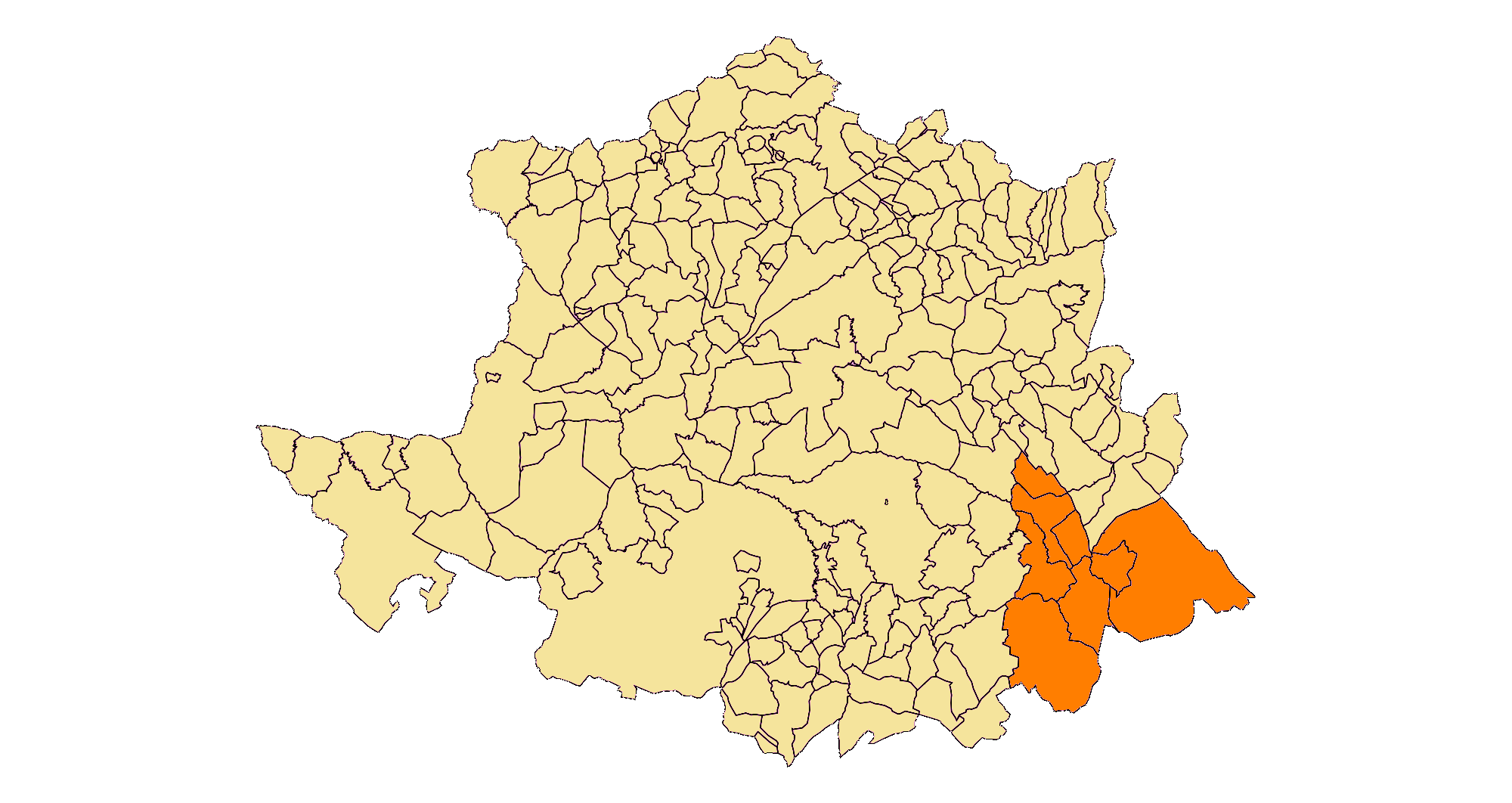
- Las Villuercas; location in Cáceres Province
- Country: Spain
- Autonomous community: Extremadura
- Province: Cáceres
- Capital: Guadalupe
- Municipalities: List: See text

Area
  - Total: 1,545.5 km^{2} (596.7 sq mi)
- Elevation: 570 m (1,870 ft)

Population (2015)
  - Total: 9,045
  - Density: 5.852/km^{2} (15.16/sq mi)
- Time zone: UTC+1 (CET)
  - Summer (DST): UTC+2 (CEST)

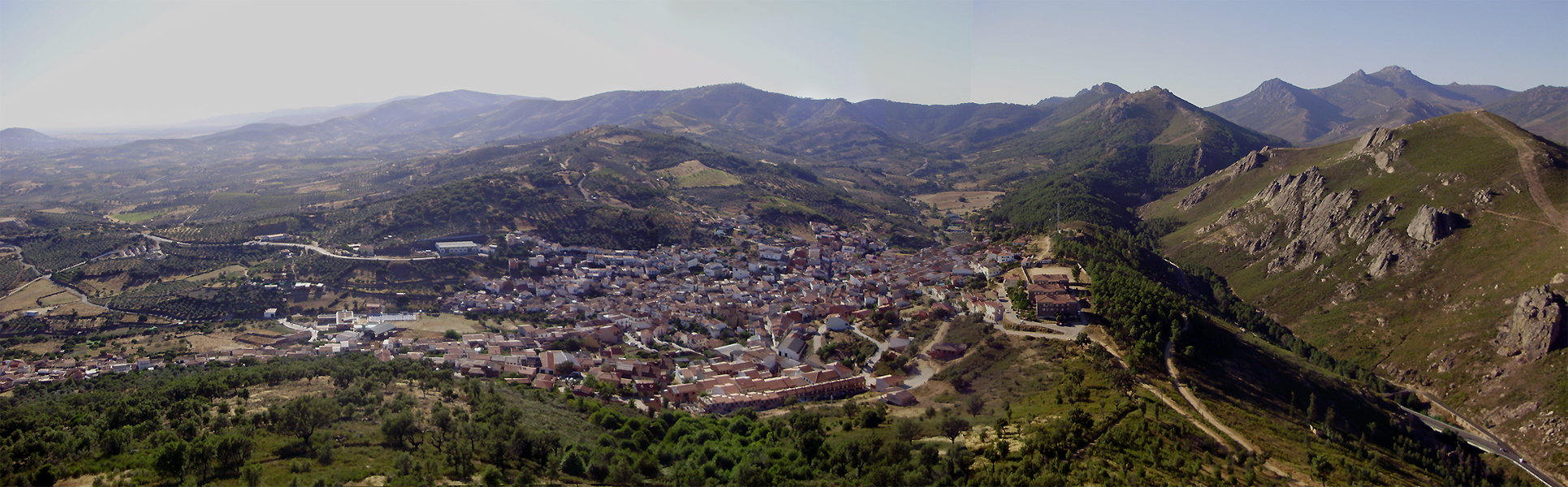
Typical landscape of Las Villuercas in Cañamero.

Las Villuercas is a comarca located in the province of Cáceres, western Spain. It belongs to the Autonomous Community of Extremadura.

Despite the traditional strong identity of its inhabitants, this historical region has not been able to achieve the necessary legal recognition for its administrative development. The comarca has a total of about 9,000 inhabitants.

Its geography is typical of the Meseta Central. The Sierra de Villuercas, also known as Sierra de Guadalupe, is part of this comarca.

The comarca is named after La Villuerca, the highest peak in the range and also the highest point of the greater Montes de Toledo system, an ancient name that has been documented since 1353.

== Municipalities ==
The comarca contains the following municipalities:

- Alía
  - Cíjara
  - Puerto Rey
  - La Calera
- Berzocana
- Cabañas del Castillo
  - Solana de Cabañas
  - Retamosa de Cabañas
  - Roturas de Cabañas
- Cañamero
- Guadalupe
- Logrosán
- Navezuelas
- Robledollano
