= Schola Philosophicae Initiationis =

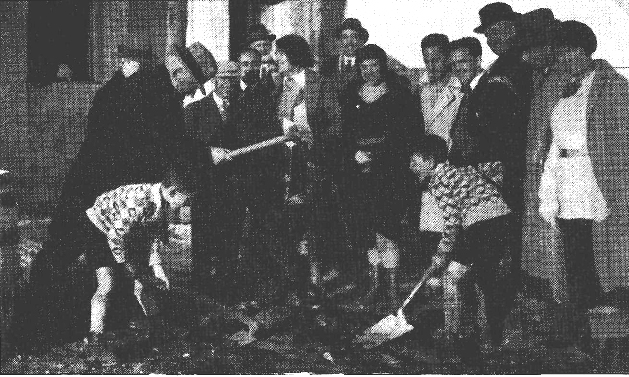
Inauguration of the “House of the Philosopher” of the Schola Philosophicae Initiationis. On first plane there appear Mario Roso de Luna and Eduardo Alfonso.

The Schola Philosophicae Initiationis (School of Philosophical Initiation) was a Theosophical splinter group created in Madrid in 1928 by Eduardo Alfonso and Mario Roso de Luna in response to what they considered the doctrinal deviations of the Theosophical Society, especially in reference to the proclamation of Jiddu Krishnamurti as the World Teacher.

== Foundation ==
In mid-1921, Mario Roso de Luna, with a dozen companions from Madrid, formed the Rama Hesperia, which kept close ties with the Theosophical Society Adyar in India as well as with the dissident Theosophical Society Pasadena in California. Around 1928, Roso de Luna and his group founded the initiatic philosophical school Schola Philosophicae Initiationis (SPI) that was "a reaction against the instability and indiscipline of the Theosophical Society." The declared objectives of the SPI were "the comparative study of the philosophies, sciences and arts in their mutual relations, and promoting the health and culture of its members as well as their moral progress".

The new School bought a property in Manzanares el Real in the Community of Madrid to build a center for advanced philosophical studies called The House of the Philosopher. The School was based on three stages of knowledge "as corresponds to any initiatic society and consequently to the three objects of the Theosophical Society, that deep inside are nothing but the three initiatic grades of all corresponding institutions which, having been misunderstood and disrespected, have led the T.S. to disunity and mental anarchy".

The disciples of the SPI followed a gradual and methodical program of studies covering the three stages: the first, studies on Hygiene and Morals; the second on Science and Nature; and the third on Psychology and Philosophy.

== Decline and dissolution ==
Mario Roso de Luna died in 1931, after which Dr. Eduardo Alfonso became the head of the School, continuing the instruction of disciples. However, after 1936, the Spanish Civil War caused the suspension of many of the philosophical and cultural activities in Madrid. At the end of the Civil War, Eduardo Alfonso was tried according to the “Law for the Repression of Masonry and Communism” and sentenced to several years of imprisonment which he served in a Burgos prison from 1942 to 1948. After serving his time, Alfonso was exiled to Latin America until 1966 when he returned to his Country.
