= Jonas Gregaard =

Danish cyclist

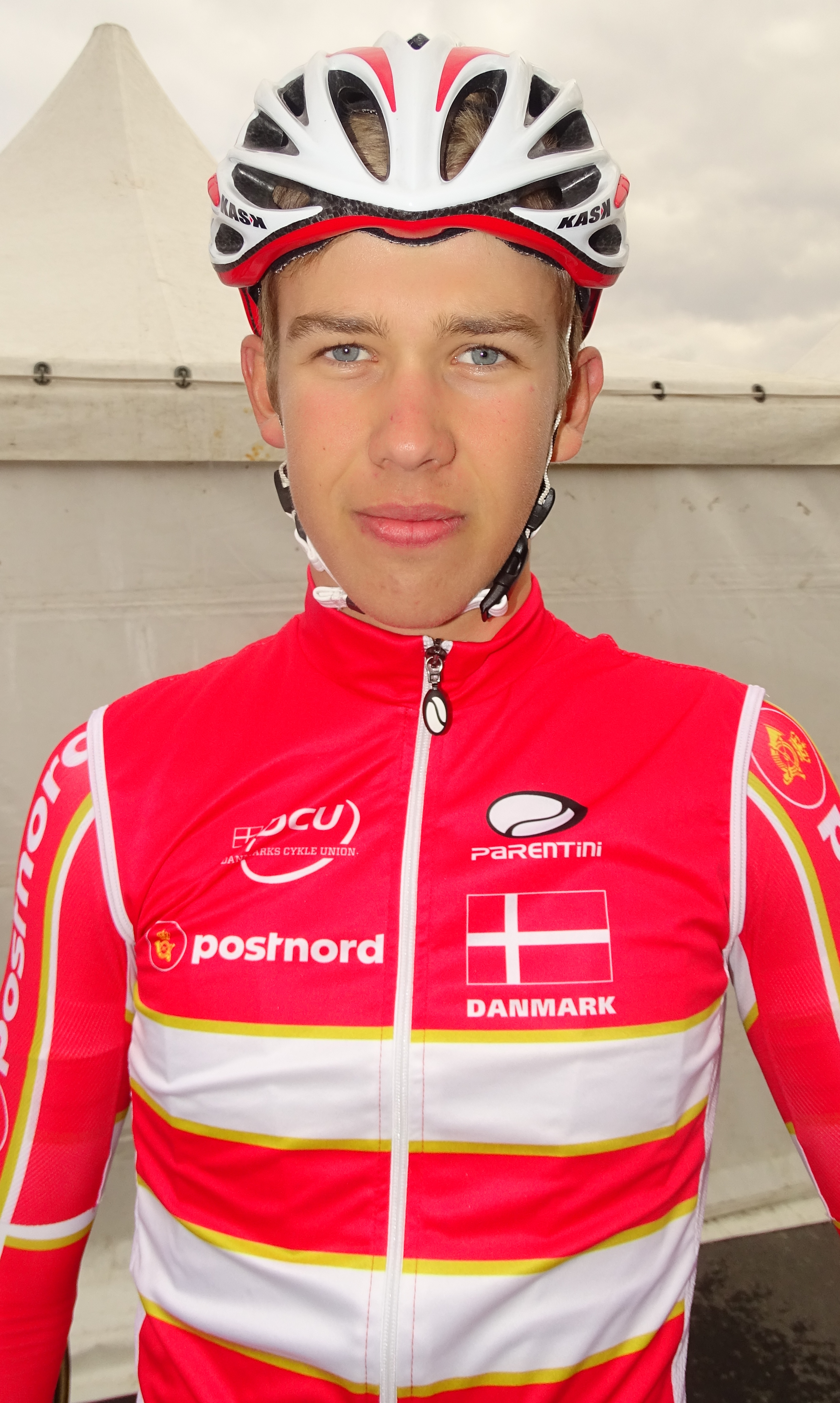
- Gregaard in 2015.

Personal information
- Full name: Jonas Gregaard Wilsly
- Born: 30 July 1996 (age 30) Herlev Municipality, Denmark
- Height: 1.84 m (6 ft 0 in)
- Weight: 66 kg (146 lb)

Cycling career
- Sport: Cycling
- Current team: Lotto–Intermarché
- Discipline: Road
- Role: Rider
- Rider type: Climber

Professional teams
- 2015: Team TreFor–Blue Water
- 2016–2018: Riwal Platform
- 2018: Astana (stagiaire)
- 2019–2021: Astana
- 2022–2023: Uno-X Pro Cycling Team
- 2024–2025: Lotto–Dstny

Jonas Gregaard Wilsly (born 30 July 1996) is a Danish cyclist, who last rode for UCI ProTeam Lotto–Intermarché. He announced his retirement from professional cycling in November 2025.

== Major results ==
2014
1st Road race, National Junior Road Championships
2015
1st Road race, National Under-23 Road Championships
1st Stage 2 (TTT) ZLM Tour
10th Ringerike GP
2016
1st Himmerland Rundt
1st Mountains classification, Tour de Normandie
5th Coupe des Carpathes
6th Ringerike GP
10th Sundvolden GP
2017
1st Overall Kreiz Breizh Elites

1st Young rider classification

3rd Overall Tour of Małopolska

1st Young rider classification

6th GP Viborg
10th Overall Danmark Rundt
10th Ringerike GP
2018
1st Stage 4 (TTT) Tour de l'Avenir
3rd Overall Giro della Valle d'Aosta
4th Overall Tour of Małopolska

1st Young rider classification

2021
9th Vuelta a Murcia
2022
6th Overall Route d'Occitanie
7th Overall Tour de Luxembourg
2023
1st Mountains classification, Paris–Nice

=== Grand Tour general classification results timeline ===
Grand Tour	2020	2021	2022	2023	2024	2025
Giro d'Italia	53	—	—	—	—	—
Tour de France	—	—	—	43	—	—
Vuelta a España	—	—	—	—	—	89

Legend
—	Did not compete
DNF	Did not finish
