= Cañamero =

Cañamero, Spain
- Flag Coat of arms

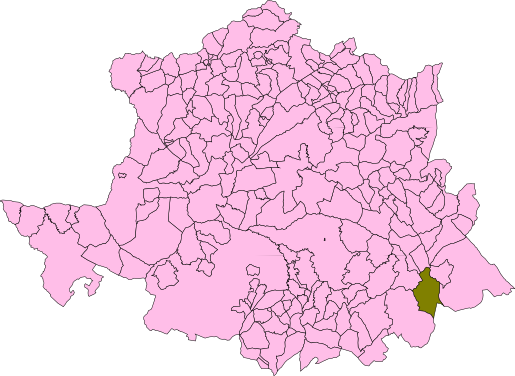
- Coordinates: 39°18′N 5°22′W
- Country: Spain
- Autonomous community: Extremadura
- Province: Cáceres
- Comarca: Las Villuercas

Area
  - Total: 151 km^{2} (58 sq mi)
- Elevation: 598 m (1,962 ft)

Population (2025-01-01)
  - Total: 1,578
  - Density: 10.5/km^{2} (27.1/sq mi)
- Time zone: UTC+1 (CET)
  - Summer (DST): UTC+2 (CEST)

Cañamero (Extremaduran: Cañameru) is a municipality located in the province of Cáceres, Extremadura, Spain. According to the 2005 census (INE), the municipality has a population of 1630 inhabitants.

== See also ==
- List of municipalities in Cáceres
