= Alía =

- Municipality
- Flag Coat of arms

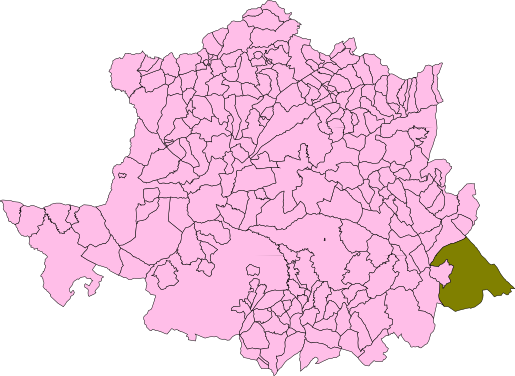
- Location of Alía in Cáceres

- Location in Spain
- Coordinates: 39°26′N 5°27′W
- Country: Spain
- Autonomous community: Extremadura
- Province: Cáceres
- Comarca: Las Villuercas

Area
  - Total: 602 km^{2} (232 sq mi)
- Elevation: 582 m (1,909 ft)

Population (2025-01-01)
  - Total: 722
  - Density: 1.20/km^{2} (3.11/sq mi)
- Time zone: UTC+1 (CET)
  - Summer (DST): UTC+2 (CEST)

Alía is a municipality located in the province of Cáceres, Extremadura, Spain. According to the 2018 census, the municipality has a population of 831 inhabitants.

Javier Saviola's grandfathers are from Alía.

== Villages ==
- Cíjara
- Puerto del Rey
- La Calera
- Pantano de Cijara

== See also ==
- List of municipalities in Cáceres
