= Belmont-sur-Rance =

Commune in Occitanie, France

- Commune
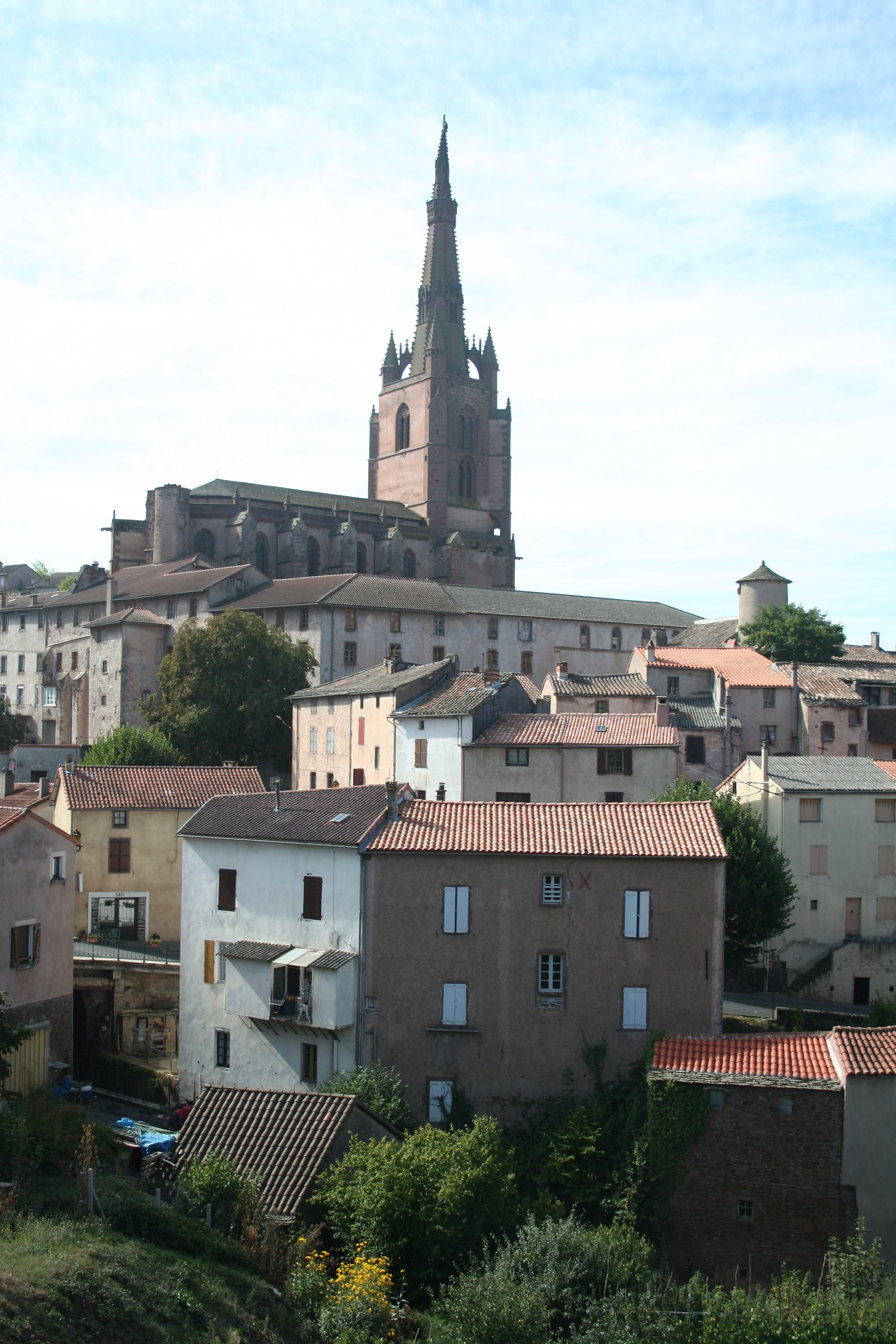
- View of Belmont-sur-Rance with the Saint-Michel collegiate church

- Coat of arms
- Location of Belmont-sur-Rance
- Location within France Location within Occitanie
- Coordinates: 43°49′04″N 2°45′21″E
- Country: France
- Region: Occitania
- Department: Aveyron
- Arrondissement: Millau
- Canton: Causses-Rougiers

Government
  - Mayor (2020–2026): Monique Alies
- Area^{1}: 44.19 km^{2} (17.06 sq mi)
- Elevation: 460 m (1,510 ft)
- Highest elevation: 854 m (2,802 ft)
- Lowest elevation: 394 m (1,293 ft)
- Population (2023): 1,001
  - Density: 22.65/km^{2} (58.67/sq mi)
- Time zone: UTC+01:00 (CET)
  - Summer (DST): UTC+02:00 (CEST)
- INSEE/Postal code: 12025 /12370
- ^{1} French Land Register data, which excludes lakes, ponds, glaciers > 1 km^{2} (0.386 sq mi or 247 acres) and river estuaries.

Belmont-sur-Rance (French pronunciation: [bɛlmɔ̃ syʁ ʁɑ̃s]; Occitan: Bèlmont de Rance) is a commune in the Aveyron department in southern France.

== Population ==
Historical population
Year	Pop.	±% p.a.
1968	877	—
1975	794	−1.41%
1982	883	+1.53%
1990	1,021	+1.83%
1999	1,006	−0.16%
2007	1,012	+0.07%
2012	976	−0.72%
2017	976	+0.00%
2023	1,001	+0.42%
Source: INSEE

== See also ==
- Communes of the Aveyron department
