= Berzocana =

Berzocana, Spain
- Flag Coat of arms

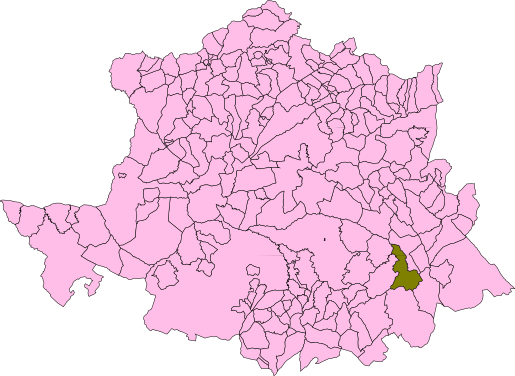
- Country: Spain
- Autonomous community: Extremadura
- Province: Cáceres
- Comarca: Las Villuercas

Area
  - Total: 134 km^{2} (52 sq mi)
- Elevation: 728 m (2,388 ft)

Population (2025-01-01)
  - Total: 375
  - Density: 2.80/km^{2} (7.25/sq mi)
- Time zone: UTC+1 (CET)
  - Summer (DST): UTC+2 (CEST)

Berzocana is a municipality located in the province of Cáceres, Extremadura, Spain. According to the 2005 census (INE), the municipality has a population of 497 inhabitants.

== See also ==
- List of municipalities in Cáceres
