= Antonio Jesús Soto =

Spanish road bicycle racer

Personal information
- Full name: Antonio Jesús Soto Guirao
- Born: 22 September 1994 (age 32) Alcantarilla, Spain
- Height: 1.75 m (5 ft 9 in)
- Weight: 66 kg (146 lb)

Cycling career
- Sport: Cycling
- Current team: Equipo Kern Pharma
- Discipline: Road
- Role: Rider

Amateur teams
- 2013: Metal Lube–Ofertbikes.es
- 2014: Hostal Latorre
- 2015: Telco'm–Gimex
- 2016: Aldro
- 2017–2018: Lizarte

Professional teams
- 2019–2023: Fundación Euskadi
- 2024–: Equipo Kern Pharma

Antonio Jesús Soto Guirao (born 15 February 1996) is a Spanish cyclist, who currently rides for UCI ProTeam Equipo Kern Pharma.

== Major results ==
2020
9th Overall Vuelta a Murcia
2021
1st Vuelta a Murcia
10th Circuito de Getxo
2022
5th Clàssica Comunitat Valenciana 1969
2023
5th Trofeo Ses Salines–Alcúdia
6th Clàssica Comunitat Valenciana 1969

=== Grand Tour general classification results timeline ===
Grand Tour	2021
Giro d'Italia	—
Tour de France	—
Vuelta a España	81

Legend
—	Did not compete
DNF	Did not finish
