= 2022 Team DSM (men's team) season =

Team DSM
- 2022 season
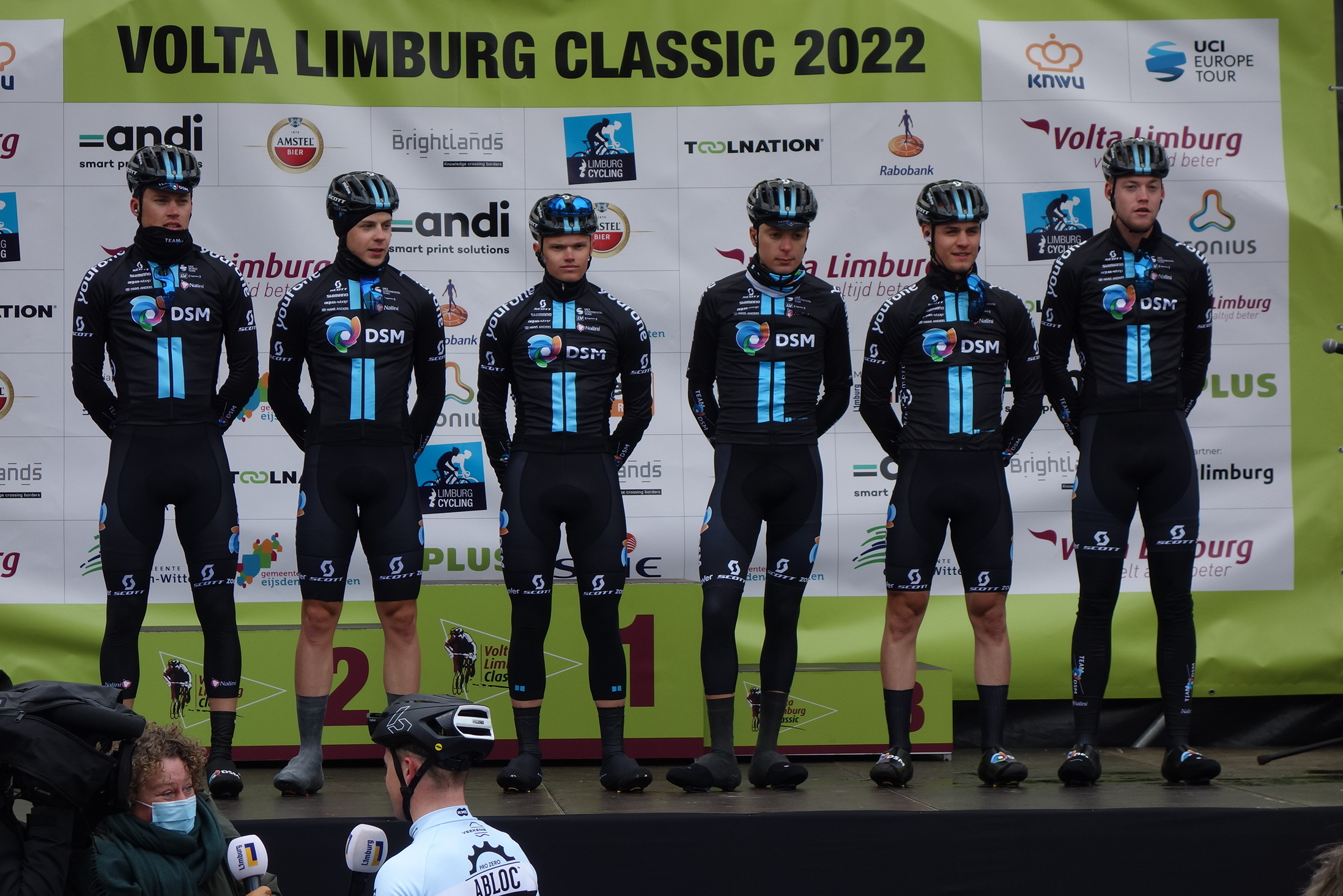
- Team DSM at the Volta Limburg Classic
- UCI code: DSM
- Status: UCI WorldTeam
- Manager: Iwan Spekenbrink (NED)
- Main sponsor(s): DSM
- Based: Netherlands
- Bicycles: Scott
- Groupset: Shimano

Season victories
- Stage race overall: 1
- Stage race stages: 2
- Jersey

The 2022 season for Team DSM is the team's 10th season as a UCI WorldTeam and its 18th overall. Dutch health and materials company DSM continues as the title sponsor for the second consecutive year, but the team returns to having a Dutch registration for the first season since 2014 after seven years with a German registration. They use Scott bicycles, Shimano drivetrain, Shimano wheels and Craft clothing.

== Team roster ==
As of 21 January 2022.

Rider	Date of birth
Thymen Arensman (NED)	4 December 1999 (aged 22)
Nikias Arndt (GER)	18 November 1991 (aged 30)
Romain Bardet (FRA)	9 November 1990 (aged 31)
Cees Bol (NED)	27 July 1995 (aged 26)
Marco Brenner (GER)	27 August 2002 (aged 19)
Romain Combaud (FRA)	1 April 1991 (aged 30)
Alberto Dainese (ITA)	25 March 1998 (aged 23)
John Degenkolb (GER)	7 January 1989 (aged 32)
Nico Denz (GER)	15 February 1994 (aged 27)
Mark Donovan (GBR)	3 April 1999 (aged 22)
Nils Eekhoff (NED)	23 January 1998 (aged 23)
Chris Hamilton (AUS)	18 May 1995 (aged 26)
Leon Heinschke (GER)	8 November 1999 (aged 22)
Jonas Iversby Hvideberg (NOR)	9 February 1999 (aged 22)

Rider	Date of birth
Asbjørn Kragh Andersen (DEN)	9 April 1992 (aged 29)
Søren Kragh Andersen (DEN)	10 August 1994 (aged 27)
Andreas Leknessund (NOR)	21 May 1999 (aged 22)
Niklas Märkl (GER)	3 March 1999 (aged 22)
Marius Mayrhofer (GER)	18 September 2000 (aged 21)
Tim Naberman (NED)	11 May 1999 (aged 22)
Joris Nieuwenhuis (NED)	11 February 1996 (aged 25)
Casper Pedersen (DEN)	15 March 1996 (aged 25)
Frederik Rodenberg (DEN)	22 January 1998 (aged 23)
Florian Stork (GER)	27 April 1997 (aged 24)
Martijn Tusveld (NED)	9 September 1993 (aged 28)
Henri Vandenabeele (BEL)	15 April 2000 (aged 21)
Kevin Vermaerke (USA)	16 October 2000 (aged 21)
Sam Welsford (AUS)	19 January 1996 (aged 25)

Riders who joined the team for the 2022 season

Rider	2021 team
John Degenkolb	Lotto–Soudal
Leon Heinschke	neo-pro (Development Team DSM)
Jonas Iversby Hvideberg	Uno-X Pro Cycling Team
Marius Mayrhofer	neo-pro (Development Team DSM)
Tim Naberman	neo-pro (Development Team DSM)
Frederik Rodenberg	Uno-X Pro Cycling Team
Henri Vandenabeele	neo-pro (Development Team DSM)
Sam Welsford	neo-pro (track cycling)

Riders who left the team during or after the 2021 season

Rider	2022 team
Tiesj Benoot (Note: After it was announced on 7 December 2021 that Team DSM had released Benoot from his contract one year early, Team Jumbo–Visma announced his signing for the 2022 season later that day.)	Team Jumbo–Visma
Felix Gall	AG2R Citroën Team
Chad Haga	Human Powered Health
Jai Hindley	Bora–Hansgrohe
Max Kanter	Movistar Team
Nicolas Roche	Retired
Martin Salmon	Retired
Michael Storer	Groupama–FDJ
Jasha Sütterlin	Team Bahrain Victorious
Ilan Van Wilder (Note: After a contractual dispute between Van Wilder and Team DSM, his contracted was terminated and he joined Deceuninck–Quick-Step with immediate effect on 18 November 2021.)	Quick-Step Alpha Vinyl Team

== Season victories ==
Date	Race	Competition	Rider	Country	Location	Ref.
14 April	Presidential Tour of Turkey, Stage 5	UCI ProSeries	Sam Welsford (AUS)	Turkey	Ayvalık	
22 April	Tour of the Alps, Overall	UCI ProSeries	Romain Bardet (FRA)	Italy/Austria		
22 April	Tour of the Alps, Young rider classification	UCI ProSeries	Thymen Arensman (NED)	Italy/Austria		
18 May	Giro d'Italia, Stage 11	UCI World Tour	Alberto Dainese (ITA)	Italy	Reggio Emilia	

== National, Continental, and World Champions ==
Date	Discipline	Jersey	Rider	Country	Location	Ref.
