= 2019 Okolo Slovenska =

2019 Tour of Slovakia
2019 UCI Europe Tour

Race details
- Dates: September 18–21, 2019
- Stages: 4
- Distance: 714.9 km (444.2 mi)

Results
Jersey awarded to the overall winner	Winner	Yves Lampaert (BEL)	(Deceuninck–Quick-Step)
	Second	Arnaud Démare (FRA)	(Groupama–FDJ)
	Third	Stefan Küng (SUI)	(Groupama–FDJ)
Jersey awarded to the points classification winner	Points	Arnaud Démare (FRA)	(Groupama–FDJ)
Jersey awarded to the mountains classification winner	Mountains	Martin Salmon (GER)	(Development Team Sunweb)
Jersey awarded to the youth classification winner	Youth	Torjus Sleen (NOR)	(Uno-X Norwegian Development Team)
	Team	CCC Team	

The 2019 Okolo Slovenska (transl. Tour of Slovakia) was a five-stage men's professional road cycling race. The race is the 63rd edition of the Okolo Slovenska. It is rated as a 2.1 event as part of the 2019 UCI Europe Tour. The race started in Bardejov on 18 September and finished on 21 September in Senica.

== Teams ==
The 22 teams invited to the race were:

UCI WorldTeams

- Bora–Hansgrohe
- CCC Team
- Deceuninck–Quick-Step
- Groupama–FDJ
- UAE Team Emirates

UCI Professional Continental teams

- Androni Giocattoli–Sidermec
- Delko–Marseille Provence
- Gazprom–RusVelo
- Israel Cycling Academy
- Riwal Readynez
- Roompot–Charles
- Team Novo Nordisk
- Wallonie Bruxelles

UCI Continental Teams

- Adria Mobil
- Development Team Sunweb
- Dukla Banská Bystrica
- Elkov–Author
- Team Felbermayr–Simplon Wels
- Pannon Cycling Team
- Uno-X Norwegian Development Team
- Voster ATS Team

National Teams

- Slovakia

== Route ==
Stage characteristics and winners
Stage	Date	Course	Distance	Type	Winner
1a	18 September	Bardejov to Bardejov	138.2 km (86 mi)	Hilly stage	Alexander Kristoff (NOR)
1b	18 September	Bardejov	7.4 km (5 mi)	Individual time trial	Stefan Küng (SUI)
2	19 September	Bardejov to Ružomberok	226.6 km (141 mi)	Mountain stage	Eduard-Michael Grosu (ROM)
3	20 September	Ružomberok to Hlohovec	200.6 km (125 mi)	Hilly stage	Arnaud Démare (FRA)
4	21 September	Hlohovec to Senica	142.1 km (88 mi)	Flat stage	Elia Viviani (ITA)
	Total		714.9 km (444 mi)		

== Stages ==
=== Stage 1a ===
18 September 2019 — Bardejov to Bardejov, 138.2 km (85.9 mi)

Stage 1a result
Rank	Rider	Team	Time
1	Alexander Kristoff (NOR)	UAE Team Emirates	3h 21' 48"
2	Michael Mørkøv (DEN)	Deceuninck–Quick-Step	+ 0"
3	Elia Viviani (ITA)	Deceuninck–Quick-Step	+ 0"
4	Erik Baška (SVK)	Bora–Hansgrohe	+ 0"
5	Arnaud Démare (FRA)	Groupama–FDJ	+ 0"
6	Rudy Barbier (FRA)	Israel Cycling Academy	+ 0"
7	Emīls Liepiņš (LVA)	Wallonie Bruxelles	+ 0"
8	Andrea Peron (ITA)	Team Novo Nordisk	+ 0"
9	Boy van Poppel (NED)	Roompot–Charles	+ 0"
10	Yves Lampaert (BEL)	Deceuninck–Quick-Step	+ 0"

General classification after stage 1a
Rank	Rider	Team	Time
1	Alexander Kristoff (NOR)	UAE Team Emirates	3h 21' 42"
2	Michael Mørkøv (DEN)	Deceuninck–Quick-Step	+ 2"
3	Florian Kierner (AUT)	Team Felbermayr–Simplon Wels	+ 3"
4	Elia Viviani (ITA)	Deceuninck–Quick-Step	+ 4"
5	Anders Skaarseth (NOR)	Uno-X Norwegian Development Team	+ 4"
6	Rasmus Bøgh Wallin (DEN)	Riwal Readynez	+ 5"
7	Erik Baška (SVK)	Bora–Hansgrohe	+ 6"
8	Arnaud Démare (FRA)	Groupama–FDJ	+ 6"
9	Rudy Barbier (FRA)	Israel Cycling Academy	+ 6"
10	Emīls Liepiņš (LVA)	Wallonie Bruxelles	+ 6"

=== Stage 1b ===
18 September 2019 — Bardejov, 6.8 km (4.2 mi) (ITT)

Stage 1b result
Rank	Rider	Team	Time
1	Stefan Küng (SUI)	Groupama–FDJ	9' 04"
2	Yves Lampaert (BEL)	Deceuninck–Quick-Step	+ 3"
3	Bob Jungels (LUX)	Deceuninck–Quick-Step	+ 8"
4	Kamil Gradek (POL)	CCC Team	+ 10"
5	Matthias Brändle (AUT)	Israel Cycling Academy	+ 12"
6	Tom Bohli (SUI)	UAE Team Emirates	+ 12"
7	Jan Bárta (CZE)	Elkov–Author	+ 15"
8	Gijs Van Hoecke (BEL)	CCC Team	+ 17"
9	Erik Baška (SVK)	Bora–Hansgrohe	+ 23"
10	Arnaud Démare (FRA)	Groupama–FDJ	+ 23"

General classification after stage 1b
Rank	Rider	Team	Time
1	Stefan Küng (SUI)	Groupama–FDJ	3h 30' 52"
2	Yves Lampaert (BEL)	Deceuninck–Quick-Step	+ 3"
3	Bob Jungels (LUX)	Deceuninck–Quick-Step	+ 8"
4	Kamil Gradek (POL)	CCC Team	+ 10"
5	Matthias Brändle (AUT)	Israel Cycling Academy	+ 12"
6	Tom Bohli (SUI)	UAE Team Emirates	+ 12"
7	Jan Bárta (CZE)	Elkov–Author	+ 15"
8	Gijs Van Hoecke (BEL)	CCC Team	+ 17"
9	Michael Mørkøv (DEN)	Deceuninck–Quick-Step	+ 21"
10	Elia Viviani (ITA)	Deceuninck–Quick-Step	+ 22"

=== Stage 2 ===
19 September 2019 — Bardejov to Ružomberok, 226.6 km (140.8 mi)

Stage 2 result
Rank	Rider	Team	Time
1	Eduard-Michael Grosu (ROM)	Delko–Marseille Provence	5h 46' 42"
2	Yves Lampaert (BEL)	Deceuninck–Quick-Step	+ 0"
3	Arnaud Démare (FRA)	Groupama–FDJ	+ 0"
4	Erik Baška (SVK)	Bora–Hansgrohe	+ 0"
5	Emīls Liepiņš (LVA)	Wallonie Bruxelles	+ 0"
6	Justin Jules (FRA)	Wallonie Bruxelles	+ 0"
7	Alexandr Riabushenko (BLR)	UAE Team Emirates	+ 0"
8	Kamil Gradek (POL)	CCC Team	+ 0"
9	Boy van Poppel (NED)	Roompot–Charles	+ 0"
10	Stefan Küng (SUI)	Groupama–FDJ	+ 0"

General classification after stage 2
Rank	Rider	Team	Time
1	Yves Lampaert (BEL)	Deceuninck–Quick-Step	9h 17' 31"
2	Stefan Küng (SUI)	Groupama–FDJ	+ 3"
3	Kamil Gradek (POL)	CCC Team	+ 13"
4	Bob Jungels (LUX)	Deceuninck–Quick-Step	+ 20"
5	Tom Bohli (SUI)	UAE Team Emirates	+ 21"
6	Arnaud Démare (FRA)	Groupama–FDJ	+ 22"
7	Matthias Brändle (AUT)	Israel Cycling Academy	+ 24"
8	Gijs Van Hoecke (BEL)	CCC Team	+ 26"
9	Erik Baška (SVK)	Bora–Hansgrohe	+ 26"
10	Jan Bárta (CZE)	Elkov–Author	+ 27"

=== Stage 3 ===
20 September 2019 — Ružomberok to Hlohovec, 200.6 km (124.6 mi)

Stage 3 result
Rank	Rider	Team	Time
1	Arnaud Démare (FRA)	Groupama–FDJ	4h 39' 09"
2	Alexandr Riabushenko (BLR)	UAE Team Emirates	+ 2"
3	Alexander Kristoff (NOR)	UAE Team Emirates	+ 2"
4	Stefan Küng (SUI)	Groupama–FDJ	+ 5"
5	Yves Lampaert (BEL)	Deceuninck–Quick-Step	+ 5"
6	Lukas Pöstlberger (AUT)	Bora–Hansgrohe	+ 5"
7	Tom Bohli (SUI)	UAE Team Emirates	+ 5"
8	Charles Planet (FRA)	Team Novo Nordisk	+ 5"
9	Gijs Van Hoecke (BEL)	CCC Team	+ 5"
10	Kamil Gradek (POL)	CCC Team	+ 5"

General classification after stage 3
Rank	Rider	Team	Time
1	Yves Lampaert (BEL)	Deceuninck–Quick-Step	13h 56' 45"
2	Stefan Küng (SUI)	Groupama–FDJ	+ 3"
3	Arnaud Démare (FRA)	Groupama–FDJ	+ 7"
4	Kamil Gradek (POL)	CCC Team	+ 13"
5	Tom Bohli (SUI)	UAE Team Emirates	+ 21"
6	Matthias Brändle (AUT)	Israel Cycling Academy	+ 24"
7	Gijs Van Hoecke (BEL)	CCC Team	+ 26"
8	Lukas Pöstlberger (AUT)	Bora–Hansgrohe	+ 34"
9	Alexandr Riabushenko (BLR)	UAE Team Emirates	+ 37"
10	Torjus Sleen (NOR)	Uno-X Norwegian Development Team	+ 40"

=== Stage 4 ===
21 September 2019 — Hlohovec to Senica, 142.1 km (88.3 mi)

Stage 4 result
Rank	Rider	Team	Time
1	Elia Viviani (ITA)	Deceuninck–Quick-Step	3h 17' 36"
2	Arnaud Démare (FRA)	Groupama–FDJ	+ 0"
3	Alexander Kristoff (NOR)	UAE Team Emirates	+ 0"
4	Erik Baška (SVK)	Bora–Hansgrohe	+ 0"
5	Matteo Pelucchi (ITA)	Androni Giocattoli–Sidermec	+ 0"
6	Rudy Barbier (FRA)	Israel Cycling Academy	+ 0"
7	Emīls Liepiņš (LVA)	Wallonie Bruxelles	+ 0"
8	Michael Mørkøv (DEN)	Deceuninck–Quick-Step	+ 0"
9	Gijs Van Hoecke (BEL)	CCC Team	+ 0"
10	Nicolai Brøchner (DEN)	Riwal Readynez	+ 0"

Final general classification
Rank	Rider	Team	Time
1	Yves Lampaert (BEL)	Deceuninck–Quick-Step	17h 14' 21"
2	Arnaud Démare (FRA)	Groupama–FDJ	+ 1"
3	Stefan Küng (SUI)	Groupama–FDJ	+ 3"
4	Kamil Gradek (POL)	CCC Team	+ 17"
5	Tom Bohli (SUI)	UAE Team Emirates	+ 21"
6	Gijs Van Hoecke (BEL)	CCC Team	+ 26"
7	Matthias Brändle (AUT)	Israel Cycling Academy	+ 28"
8	Lukas Pöstlberger (AUT)	Bora–Hansgrohe	+ 34"
9	Erik Baška (SVK)	Bora–Hansgrohe	+ 40"
10	Alexandr Riabushenko (BLR)	UAE Team Emirates	+ 41"

== Classification leadership table ==
Classification leadership by stage
Stage	Winner	General classification	Points classification	Mountains classification	Young rider classification	Team classification
1a	Alexander Kristoff	Alexander Kristoff	Alexander Kristoff	Kenny Molly	Florian Kierner	Deceuninck–Quick-Step
1b	Stefan Küng	Stefan Küng	Alexander Kristoff	Kenny Molly	Torjus Sleen	Deceuninck–Quick-Step
2	Eduard-Michael Grosu	Yves Lampaert	Alexander Kristoff	Martin Salmon	Torjus Sleen	Deceuninck–Quick-Step
3	Arnaud Démare	Yves Lampaert	Arnaud Démare	Martin Salmon	Torjus Sleen	CCC Team
4	Elia Viviani	Yves Lampaert	Arnaud Démare	Martin Salmon	Torjus Sleen	CCC Team
Final		Yves Lampaert	Arnaud Démare	Martin Salmon	Torjus Sleen	CCC Team

== Classification standings ==
Legend
Denotes the winner of the general classification	Denotes the winner of the points classification
Denotes the winner of the mountains classification	Denotes the winner of the young rider classification

=== General classification ===
Final general classification (1–10)
Rank	Rider	Team	Time
1	Yves Lampaert (BEL)	Deceuninck–Quick-Step	17h 14' 21"
2	Arnaud Démare (FRA)	Groupama–FDJ	+ 1"
3	Stefan Küng (SUI)	Groupama–FDJ	+ 3"
4	Kamil Gradek (POL)	CCC Team	+ 17"
5	Tom Bohli (SUI)	UAE Team Emirates	+ 21"
6	Gijs Van Hoecke (BEL)	CCC Team	+ 26"
7	Matthias Brändle (AUT)	Israel Cycling Academy	+ 28"
8	Lukas Pöstlberger (AUT)	Bora–Hansgrohe	+ 34"
9	Erik Baška (SVK)	Bora–Hansgrohe	+ 40"
10	Alexandr Riabushenko (BLR)	UAE Team Emirates	+ 41"

=== Points classification ===
Final points classification (1–10)
Rank	Rider	Team	Points
1	Arnaud Démare (FRA)	Groupama–FDJ	46
2	Alexander Kristoff (NOR)	UAE Team Emirates	40
3	Elia Viviani (ITA)	Deceuninck–Quick-Step	32
4	Erik Baška (SVK)	Bora–Hansgrohe	27
5	Martin Urianstad (NOR)	Uno-X Norwegian Development Team	25
6	Gašper Katrašnik (SLO)	Adria Mobil	21
7	Michael Mørkøv (DEN)	Deceuninck–Quick-Step	21
8	Mateusz Grabis (POL)	Voster ATS Team	18
9	Yves Lampaert (BEL)	Deceuninck–Quick-Step	17
10	Rémi Rochas (FRA)	Delko–Marseille Provence	16

=== Mountains classification ===
Final mountains classification (1–10)
Rank	Rider	Team	Points
1	Martin Salmon (GER)	Development Team Sunweb	42
2	Kenny Molly (BEL)	Wallonie Bruxelles	31
3	Martin Urianstad (NOR)	Uno-X Norwegian Development Team	22
4	Idar Andersen (NOR)	Uno-X Norwegian Development Team	22
5	Marek Čanecký (SVK)	Dukla Banská Bystrica	14
6	Rémi Rochas (FRA)	Delko–Marseille Provence	14
7	Emanuel Buchmann (GER)	Bora–Hansgrohe	9
8	Maciej Bodnar (POL)	Bora–Hansgrohe	6
9	Mateusz Grabis (POL)	Voster ATS Team	6
10	Petr Vakoč (CZE)	Deceuninck–Quick-Step	6

=== Young rider classification ===
Final young rider classification (1–10)
Rank	Rider	Team	Time
1	Torjus Sleen (NOR)	Uno-X Norwegian Development Team	17h 15' 05"
2	Leon Heinschke (GER)	Development Team Sunweb	+ 1"
3	Dušan Rajović (SRB)	Adria Mobil	+ 54"
4	Tim Naberman (NED)	Development Team Sunweb	+ 2' 18"
5	Niklas Märkl (GER)	Development Team Sunweb	+ 2' 35"
6	Petr Rikunov (RUS)	Gazprom–RusVelo	+ 2' 40"
7	Lukas Kubis (SVK)	Dukla Banská Bystrica	+ 2' 46"
8	Matúš Štoček (SVK)	Slovakia	+ 2' 50"
9	Nicola Venchiarutti (ITA)	Androni Giocattoli–Sidermec	+ 2' 51"
10	Aljaž Omrzel (SLO)	Adria Mobil	+ 2' 52"

=== Team classification ===
Final team classification (1–10)
Rank	Team	Time
1	CCC Team	51h 44' 40"
2	UAE Team Emirates	+ 26"
3	Bora–Hansgrohe	+ 1' 33"
4	Deceuninck–Quick-Step	+ 2' 08"
5	Groupama–FDJ	+ 2' 12"
6	Uno-X Norwegian Development Team	+ 2' 18"
7	Israel Cycling Academy	+ 2' 41"
8	Riwal Readynez	+ 3' 33"
9	Adria Mobil	+ 3' 34"
10	Roompot–Charles	+ 4' 03"
