= 2021 Team DSM (men's team) season =

Team DSM
- 2021 season
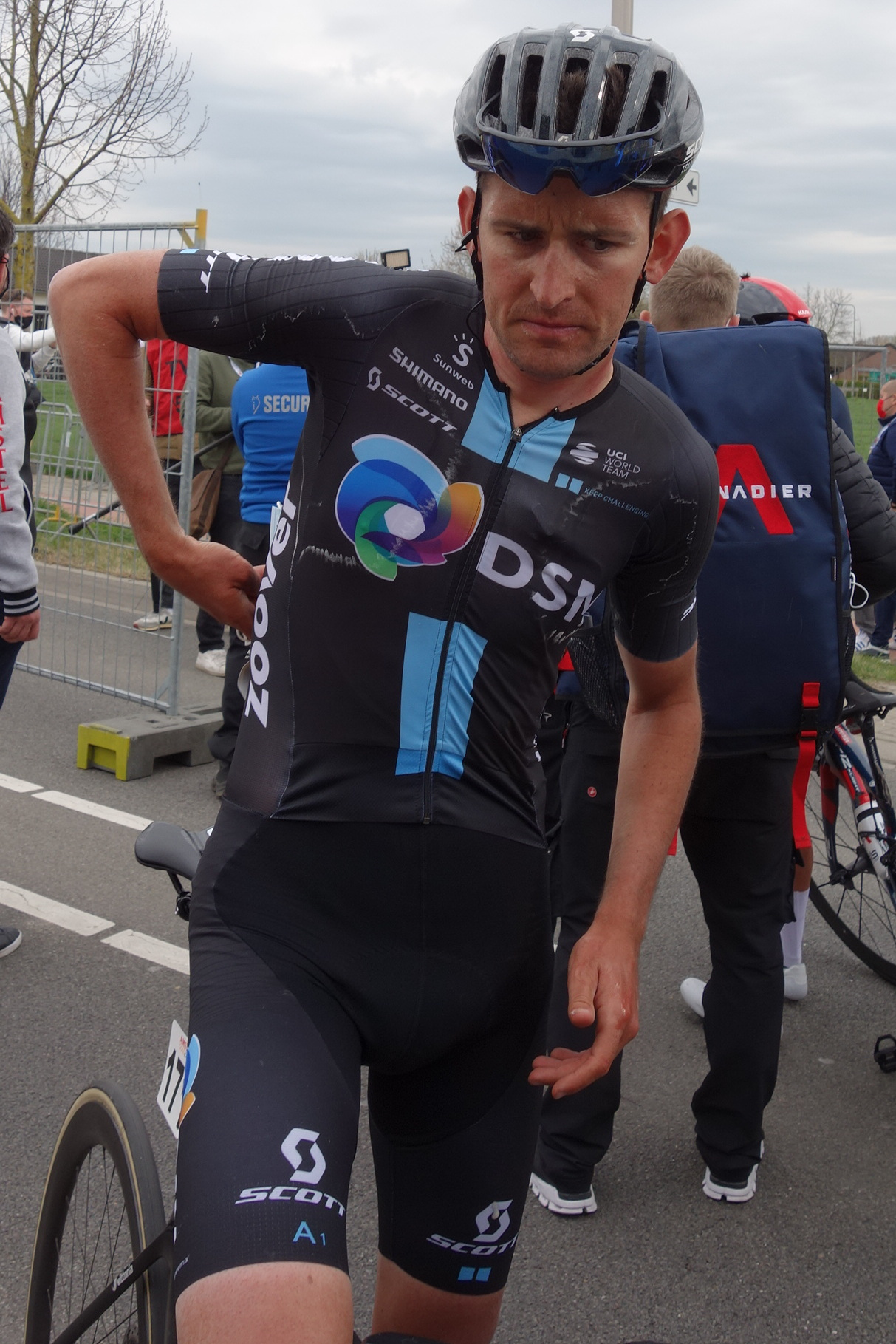
- Tiesj Benoot after the Amstel Gold Race
- UCI code: DSM
- Status: UCI WorldTeam
- World Tour Rank: 21st
- Manager: Iwan Spekenbrink (NED)
- Main sponsor(s): DSM
- Based: Germany
- Bicycles: Scott
- Groupset: Shimano

Season victories
- Stage race overall: 1
- Stage race stages: 7
- Most wins: Michael Storer (AUS) (7)
- Best ranked rider: Romain Bardet (FRA) (54th)
- Jersey

The 2021 season for Team DSM was the team's ninth season as a UCI WorldTeam and its 17th overall. After four years with Dutch travel agency and tour operator Sunweb as the team's title sponsor, Dutch health and materials company DSM took over as the title sponsor.

== Team roster ==
As of 18 November 2021.

Rider	Date of birth
Thymen Arensman (NED)	4 December 1999 (aged 21)
Nikias Arndt (GER)	18 November 1991 (aged 29)
Romain Bardet (FRA)	9 November 1990 (aged 30)
Tiesj Benoot (BEL)	11 March 1994 (aged 26)
Cees Bol (NED)	27 July 1995 (aged 25)
Marco Brenner (GER)	27 August 2002 (aged 18)
Romain Combaud (FRA)	1 April 1991 (aged 29)
Alberto Dainese (ITA)	25 March 1998 (aged 22)
Nico Denz (GER)	15 February 1994 (aged 26)
Mark Donovan (GBR)	3 April 1999 (aged 21)
Nils Eekhoff (NED)	23 January 1998 (aged 22)
Felix Gall (AUT)	27 February 1998 (aged 22)
Chad Haga (USA)	26 August 1988 (aged 32)
Chris Hamilton (AUS)	18 May 1995 (aged 25)
Jai Hindley (AUS)	5 May 1996 (aged 24)
Marc Hirschi (Note: Hirschi's contract, which was originally set to expire at the end of the 2021 season, was terminated with immediate effect on 5 January. He subsequently joined UAE Team Emirates.) (SUI)	24 August 1998 (aged 22)

Rider	Date of birth
Max Kanter (GER)	22 October 1997 (aged 23)
Asbjørn Kragh Andersen (DEN)	9 April 1992 (aged 28)
Søren Kragh Andersen (DEN)	10 August 1994 (aged 26)
Andreas Leknessund (NOR)	21 May 1999 (aged 21)
Niklas Märkl (GER)	3 March 1999 (aged 21)
Joris Nieuwenhuis (NED)	11 February 1996 (aged 24)
Casper Pedersen (DEN)	15 March 1996 (aged 24)
Nicolas Roche (IRL)	3 July 1984 (aged 36)
Martin Salmon (GER)	29 October 1997 (aged 23)
Michael Storer (AUS)	28 February 1997 (aged 23)
Florian Stork (GER)	27 April 1997 (aged 23)
Jasha Sütterlin (GER)	4 November 1992 (aged 28)
Martijn Tusveld (NED)	9 September 1993 (aged 27)
Ilan Van Wilder (Note: After a contractual dispute between Van Wilder and Team DSM, his contracted was terminated and he joined Deceuninck–Quick-Step with immediate effect on 18 November.) (BEL)	14 May 2000 (aged 20)
Kevin Vermaerke (USA)	16 October 2000 (aged 20)

Riders who joined the team for the 2021 season

Rider	2020 team
Romain Bardet	AG2R La Mondiale
Marco Brenner	neo-pro (Team Auto Eder Bayern)
Romain Combaud	Nippo–Delko–One Provence
Andreas Leknessund	Uno-X Pro Cycling Team
Niklas Märkl	neo-pro (Development Team Sunweb)
Kevin Vermaerke	neo-pro (Hagens Berman Axeon)

Riders who left the team during or after the 2020 season

Rider	2021 team
Marc Hirschi	UAE Team Emirates
Wilco Kelderman	Bora–Hansgrohe
Michael Matthews	Team BikeExchange
Sam Oomen	Team Jumbo–Visma
Robert Power	Team Qhubeka Assos

== Season victories ==
Date	Race	Competition	Rider	Country	Location	Ref.
21 February	Tour des Alpes-Maritimes et du Var, Mountains classification	UCI Europe Tour	Martijn Tusveld (NED)	France		
8 March	Paris–Nice, Stage 2	UCI World Tour	Cees Bol (NED)	France	Amilly	
2 May	Tour de Romandie, Young rider classification	UCI World Tour	Thymen Arensman (NED)	Switzerland		
30 May	Boucles de la Mayenne, Young rider classification	UCI Europe Tour; UCI ProSeries	Nils Eekhoff (NED)	France		
31 July	Tour de l'Ain, Stage 3	UCI Europe Tour	Michael Storer (AUS)	France	Lélex Monts-Jura	
31 July	Tour de l'Ain, Overall	UCI Europe Tour	Michael Storer (AUS)	France		
31 July	Tour de l'Ain, Points classification	UCI Europe Tour	Michael Storer (AUS)	France		
31 July	Tour de l'Ain, Mountains classification	UCI Europe Tour	Michael Storer (AUS)	France		
5 August	Vuelta a Burgos, Stage 3	UCI Europe Tour; UCI ProSeries	Romain Bardet (FRA)	Spain	Espinosa de los Monteros	
7 August	Vuelta a Burgos, Mountains classification	UCI Europe Tour; UCI ProSeries	Romain Bardet (FRA)	Spain		
13 August	Tour de Pologne, Stage 5	UCI World Tour	Nikias Arndt (GER)	Poland	Bielsko-Biała	
20 August	Vuelta a España, Stage 7	UCI World Tour	Michael Storer (AUS)	Spain	Balcón de Alicante	
24 August	Vuelta a España, Stage 10	UCI World Tour	Michael Storer (AUS)	Spain	Rincón de la Victoria	
28 August	Vuelta a España, Stage 14	UCI World Tour	Romain Bardet (FRA)	Spain	Pico Villuercas	
5 September	Vuelta a España, Mountains classification	UCI World Tour	Michael Storer (AUS)	Spain		
19 September	Okolo Slovenska, Team classification	UCI Europe Tour	(Note: The riders in the squad were Cees Bol, Leon Heinschke, Jai Hindley, Asbjørn Kragh Andersen, Niklas Märkl, Casper Pedersen, and Hannes Wilksch.)	Slovakia		
