= Team DSM =

Team DSM can refer to:

- Team DSM (men's team)
- Team DSM (women's team)
- Development Team DSM
