= Team Sunweb =

Team Sunweb may refer to:

- Team Sunweb (men's team), a professional cycling team that competes on the UCI World Tour
- Team Sunweb (women's team), a professional cycling team that competes on the UCI Women's World Tour
- Development Team Sunweb, a developmental cycling team that competes on UCI Continental circuits
- Marlux–Napoleon Games, a professional cycling team sponsored by Sunweb between 2007 and 2015
