= Torjus Sleen =

Norwegian cyclist

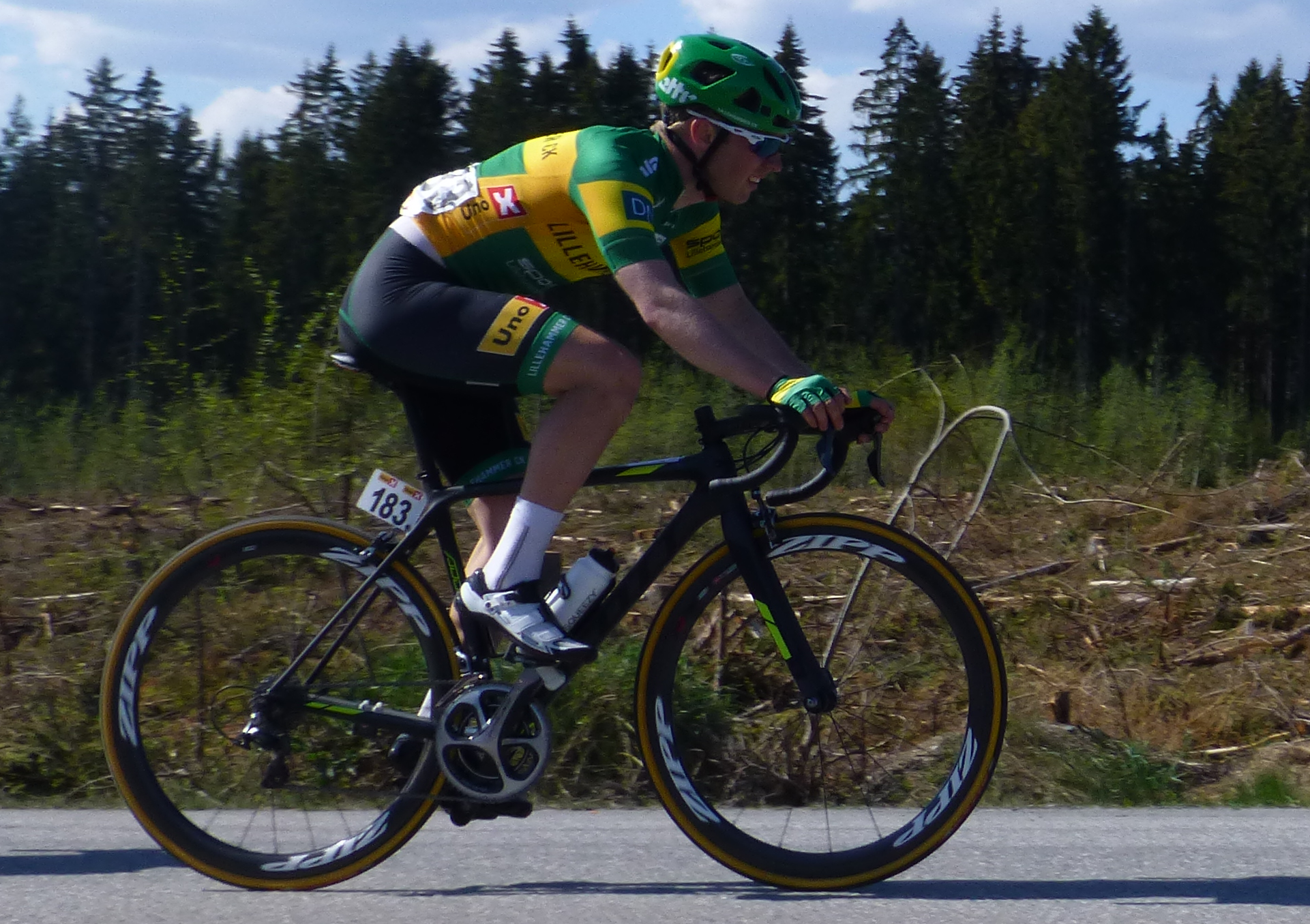

Personal information
- Full name: Torjus Sleen
- Born: 30 March 1997 (age 29) Tønsberg, Norway

Cycling career
- Sport: Cycling
- Current team: Uno-X Mobility
- Discipline: Road
- Role: Rider

Amateur teams
- 2016: Lillehammer CK
- 2016: Team Joker Byggtorget (stagiaire)

Professional team
- 2017–: Uno-X Hydrogen Development Team

Torjus Sleen (born 30 March 1997) is a Norwegian racing cyclist, who currently rides for UCI ProTeam Uno-X Mobility. He competed in the men's team time trial event at the 2017 UCI Road World Championships.

== Major results ==
2015
National Junior Road Championships

2nd Time trial
3rd Road race

2018
1st Road race, National Under–23 Road Championships
4th Road race, National Road Championships
6th Overall Czech Cycling Tour

1st Young rider classification

10th Hafjell GP
2019
1st Young rider classification Okolo Slovenska
4th Time trial, National Road Championships
7th Piccolo Giro di Lombardia
10th Road race, UCI Road World Under–23 Championships
2020
8th Hafjell GP
2021
7th Overall Oberösterreich Rundfahrt
8th Overall Tour of Małopolska
