= Tim Naberman =

Dutch cyclist

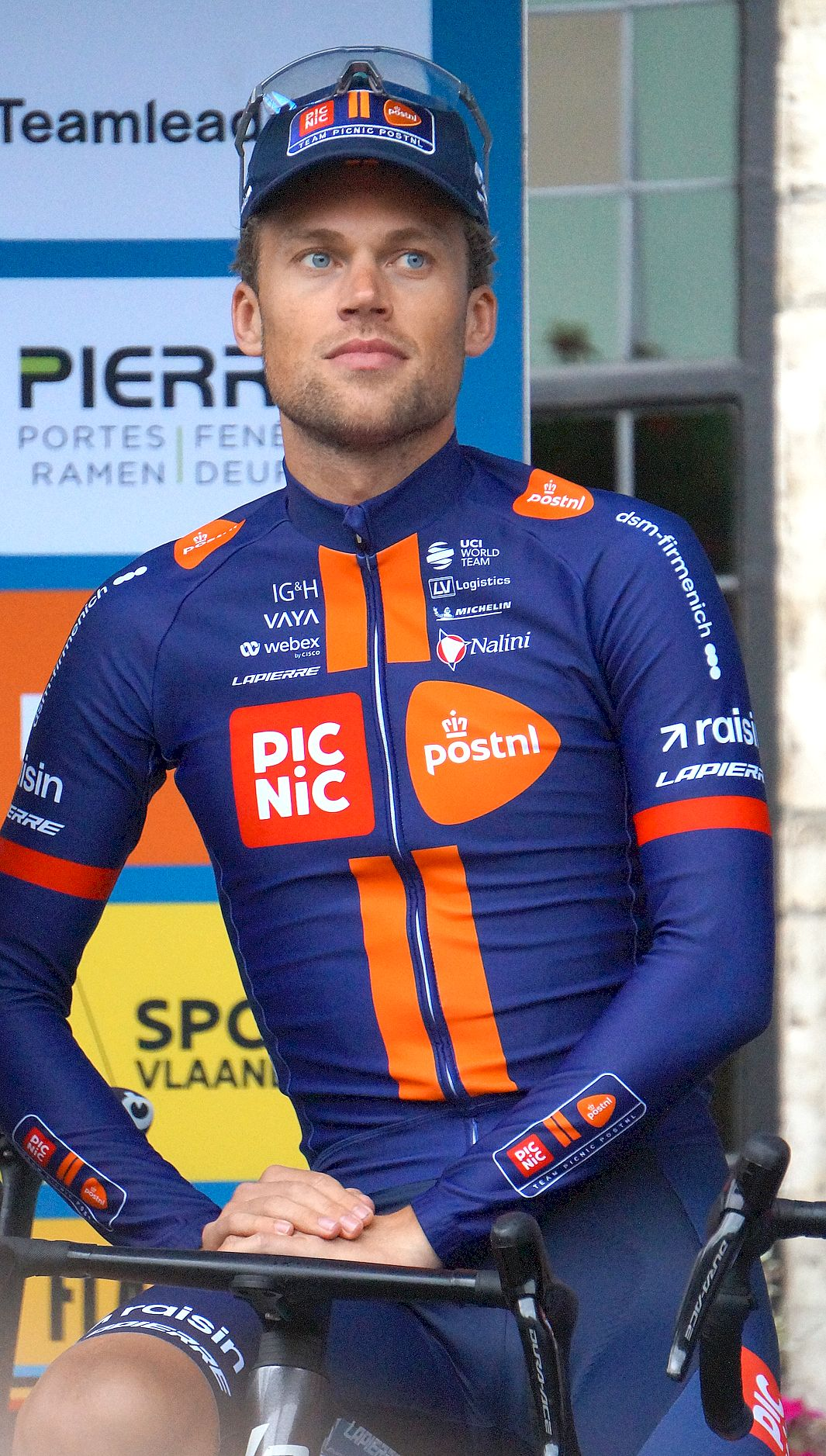
- Naberman in 2026

Personal information
- Born: 11 May 1999 (age 27) Genemuiden, Netherlands
- Height: 1.87 m (6 ft 2 in)
- Weight: 70 kg (154 lb)

Cycling career
- Sport: Cycling
- Current team: Team Picnic–PostNL
- Discipline: Road
- Role: Rider

Amateur team
- 2018: LottoNL–Jumbo–De Jonge Renner

Professional teams
- 2019–2021: Development Team Sunweb
- 2022–: Team DSM

Tim Naberman (born 11 May 1999) is a Dutch cyclist, who currently rides for UCI WorldTeam Team Picnic–PostNL.

== Major results ==
2016
3rd Overall Junior Cycling Tour Assen
7th Overall Tour des Portes du Pays d'Othe
2017
3rd Omloop van Noordwest Overijssel
9th Overall Internationale Niedersachsen-Rundfahrt
2019
5th Koningsronde van Beilen

=== Grand Tour general classification results timeline ===
Grand Tour	2024	2025
Giro d'Italia	—	—
Tour de France	—	120
Vuelta a España	135	—

Legend
—	Did not compete
DNF	Did not finish
