= 2021 Vuelta a España, Stage 1 to Stage 11 =

Vuelta a España stages (cycling)

The 2021 Vuelta a España was the 76th edition of Vuelta a España, one of cycling's Grand Tours. The Vuelta began in Burgos on 14 August, and Stage 11 from Antequera to Valdepeñas de Jaén occurred on 25 August. The race finished in Santiago de Compostela on 5 September.

== Classification standings ==
Legend
A red jersey.	Denotes the leader of the general classification	A white jersey.	Denotes the leader of the young rider classification
A green jersey.	Denotes the leader of the points classification	A white jersey with a red number bib.	Denotes the leader of the team classification
A blue polka dot jersey.	Denotes the leader of the mountains classification	A white jersey with a yellow number bib.	Denotes the winner of the combativity award

== Stage 1 ==
14 August 2021 – Burgos to Burgos, 7.1 km (4.4 mi) (ITT)

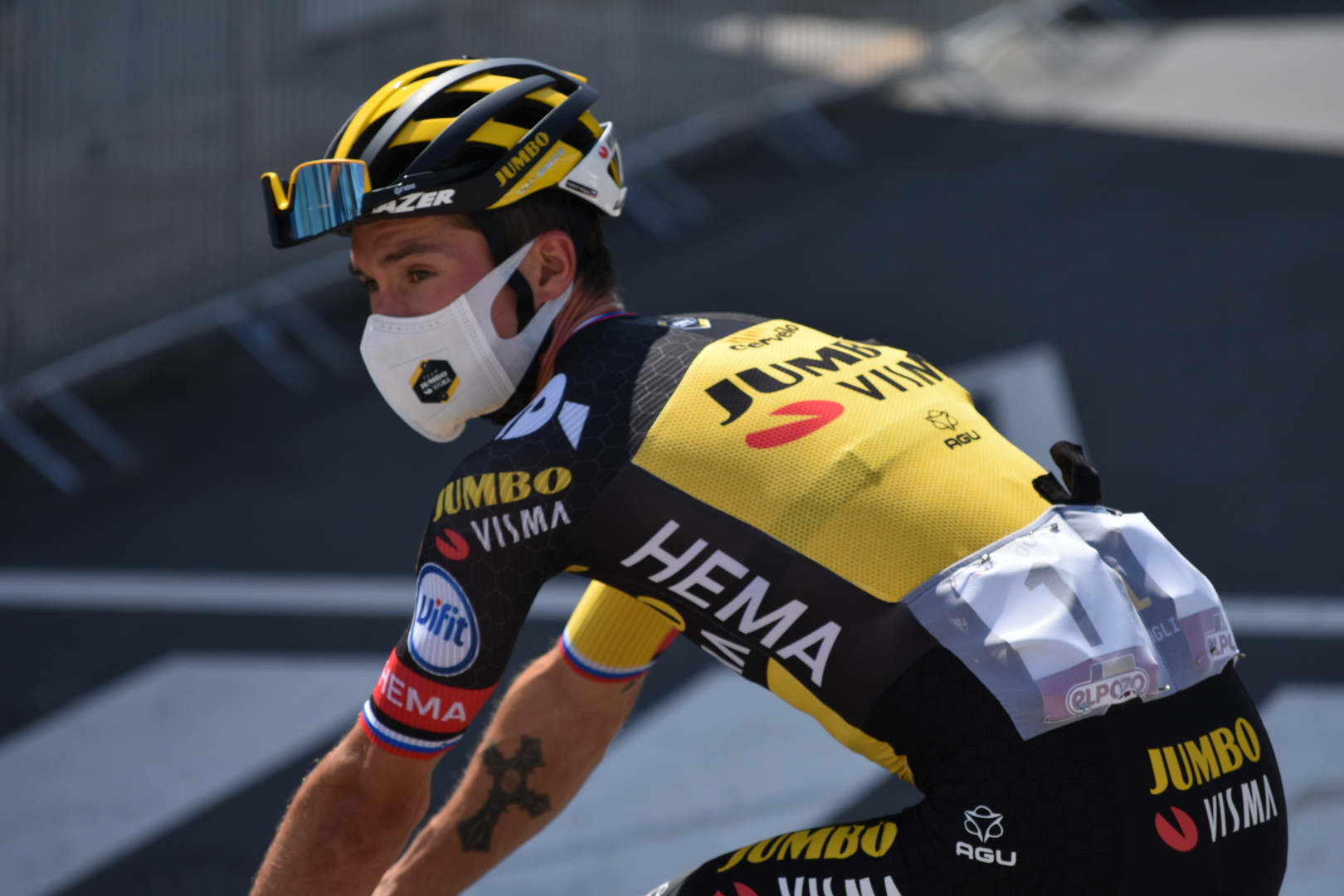
Primož Roglič, pictured on stage 5

The Vuelta began with a 7.1-kilometre (4.4 mi) individual time trial in Burgos. Immediately from the start at Burgos Cathedral, the riders began to go uphill before tackling the third-category Alto del Castillo, a 1.2-kilometre (0.75 mi) climb with an average gradient of 7.1 percent. The quickest rider at the top took the first blue polka-dot jersey as the leader of the mountains classification. Afterwards, the riders took on a 1.5-kilometre (0.93 mi) descent before a 3-kilometre (1.9 mi) flat section as the riders looped back towards the finish at the cathedral.

The first rider to set a benchmark time was the thirteenth rider to start, Omar Fraile (Astana–Premier Tech), who, with a time of 8' 55", was the first rider to finish under nine minutes. Shortly after, Adam Yates (INEOS Grenadiers) beat Fraile's time, going three seconds quicker. Several riders threatened Yates' time before his teammate, Dylan van Baarle, went nine seconds quicker with a time of 8' 43". His time stood until Alex Aranburu (Astana–Premier Tech) finished with a time of 8' 38", five seconds faster than van Baarle. Aranburu stayed in the hot seat for a long time as multiple riders went faster than him on the climb before eventually falling short by the finish. Jan Tratnik (Team Bahrain Victorious), Tom Scully (EF Education–Nippo), and Josef Černý (Deceuninck–Quick-Step) came closest to beating Aranburu's time but they fell short by two to four seconds. The last rider off the start ramp was the two-time defending champion, Primož Roglič (Team Jumbo–Visma). With a time of 8' 32", Roglič knocked Aranburu off the hot seat by six seconds to win the stage. In doing so, Roglič took the red and green jerseys as the first leader of the general and points classifications. Roglič's teammate, Sepp Kuss, set the fastest time atop the Alto del Castillo to take the blue polka-dot jersey while Andrea Bagioli (Deceuninck–Quick-Step), who finished seventh, took the white jersey as the best young rider.

In the battle amongst the other GC favorites, Aleksandr Vlasov (Astana–Premier Tech) was the closest rider to Roglič at 14 seconds down. Romain Bardet (Team DSM) and Enric Mas (Movistar Team) finished 17 and 18 seconds behind, respectively, while the other contenders lost between 20 and 40 seconds.

Stage 1 Result
Rank	Rider	Team	Time
1	Primož Roglič (SLO)	Team Jumbo–Visma	8' 32"
2	Alex Aranburu (ESP)	Astana–Premier Tech	+ 6"
3	Jan Tratnik (SLO)	Team Bahrain Victorious	+ 8"
4	Tom Scully (NZL)	EF Education–Nippo	+ 10"
5	Josef Černý (CZE)	Deceuninck–Quick-Step	+ 10"
6	Dylan van Baarle (NED)	INEOS Grenadiers	+ 11"
7	Andrea Bagioli (ITA)	Deceuninck–Quick-Step	+ 12"
8	Lawson Craddock (USA)	EF Education–Nippo	+ 13"
9	Michael Matthews (AUS)	Team BikeExchange	+ 14"
10	Aleksandr Vlasov (RUS)	Astana–Premier Tech	+ 14"

General classification after Stage 1
Rank	Rider	Team	Time
1	Primož Roglič (SLO)	Team Jumbo–Visma	8' 32"
2	Alex Aranburu (ESP)	Astana–Premier Tech	+ 6"
3	Jan Tratnik (SLO)	Team Bahrain Victorious	+ 8"
4	Tom Scully (NZL)	EF Education–Nippo	+ 10"
5	Josef Černý (CZE)	Deceuninck–Quick-Step	+ 10"
6	Dylan van Baarle (NED)	INEOS Grenadiers	+ 11"
7	Andrea Bagioli (ITA)	Deceuninck–Quick-Step	+ 12"
8	Lawson Craddock (USA)	EF Education–Nippo	+ 13"
9	Michael Matthews (AUS)	Team BikeExchange	+ 14"
10	Aleksandr Vlasov (RUS)	Astana–Premier Tech	+ 14"

== Stage 2 ==
15 August 2021 – Caleruega to Burgos, 166.7 km (103.6 mi)

The second stage of the Vuelta featured a 166.7-kilometre (103.6 mi) course with an almost entirely flat terrain that suited the sprinters. There were no categorized climbs on the route apart from a few minor lumps on the course. With 16.7 kilometres (10.4 mi) to go, there was an intermediate sprint at Tardajos that offered three, two, and one bonus second(s) to the first three riders across, respectively.

As soon as the flag dropped, three riders, Diego Rubio (Burgos BH), Sergio Martín (Caja Rural–Seguros RGA), and Xabier Azparren (Euskaltel–Euskadi), broke away from the peloton. The trio built a maximum advantage of around four minutes before Groupama–FDJ and Deceuninck–Quick-Step began to control the gap for their sprinters, Arnaud Démare and Fabio Jakobsen, respectively. The gap gradually came down before the pace in the peloton rapidly increased with around 60 kilometres (37 mi) to go as they rode into exposed roads. The trio's advantage came down to around 33 seconds before the peloton knocked off the pace, allowing the break's lead to increase again to more than a minute and a half. With around 32 kilometres (20 mi) to go, the break split as Rubio soloed off the front before he was caught by the peloton with 20 kilometres (12 mi) left; for his efforts, he was awarded the stage's combativity award.

Almost immediately, Astana–Premier Tech came to the front in an attempt to bring Alex Aranburu closer to the red jersey with the bonus seconds at the intermediate sprint. At the sprint, Aranburu was led out by his team, but Jakobsen came across first with Aranburu in second. With 4.2 kilometres (2.6 mi) to go, a crash took down some riders in the middle of the peloton. The crash caught some contenders out, including Adam Yates (INEOS Grenadiers), Hugh Carthy (EF Education–Nippo), and David de la Cruz (UAE Team Emirates), with all three losing 30 seconds to a minute. In the final sprint to the line, Juan Sebastián Molano (UAE Team Emirates) launched his sprint first but Jasper Philipsen (Alpecin–Fenix) came around him to win the stage. Second place went to Jakobsen, who was forced to take a longer route around Molano and the third-place finisher was Michael Matthews (Team BikeExchange). With his win, Philipsen also took the lead in the points classification. Primož Roglič (Team Jumbo–Visma) finished safely in the peloton to retain the red jersey.

After the stage, Alexander Cataford (Israel Start-Up Nation), who had gone down in the late crash, was diagnosed with a broken collarbone. As a result, he was unable to start stage 3 and became the first withdrawal of the race.

Stage 2 Result
Rank	Rider	Team	Time
1	Jasper Philipsen (BEL)	Alpecin–Fenix	3h 58' 57"
2	Fabio Jakobsen (NED)	Deceuninck–Quick-Step	+ 0"
3	Michael Matthews (AUS)	Team BikeExchange	+ 0"
4	Juan Sebastián Molano (COL)	UAE Team Emirates	+ 0"
5	Alex Aranburu (ESP)	Astana–Premier Tech	+ 0"
6	Jon Aberasturi (ESP)	Caja Rural–Seguros RGA	+ 0"
7	Martin Laas (EST)	Bora–Hansgrohe	+ 0"
8	Riccardo Minali (ITA)	Intermarché–Wanty–Gobert Matériaux	+ 0"
9	Florian Vermeersch (BEL)	Lotto–Soudal	+ 0"
10	Piet Allegaert (BEL)	Cofidis	+ 0"

General classification after Stage 2
Rank	Rider	Team	Time
1	Primož Roglič (SLO)	Team Jumbo–Visma	4h 07' 29"
2	Alex Aranburu (ESP)	Astana–Premier Tech	+ 4"
3	Michael Matthews (AUS)	Team BikeExchange	+ 10"
4	Josef Černý (CZE)	Deceuninck–Quick-Step	+ 10"
5	Dylan van Baarle (NED)	INEOS Grenadiers	+ 11"
6	Andrea Bagioli (ITA)	Deceuninck–Quick-Step	+ 12"
7	Aleksandr Vlasov (RUS)	Astana–Premier Tech	+ 14"
8	Jan Polanc (SLO)	UAE Team Emirates	+ 15"
9	Sepp Kuss (USA)	Team Jumbo–Visma	+ 15"
10	Chad Haga (USA)	Team DSM	+ 17"

== Stage 3 ==
16 August 2021 – Santo Domingo de Silos to Espinosa de los Monteros – Picón Blanco, 202.8 km (126.0 mi)

The third stage featured the first summit finish of the race as the riders headed from Santo Domingo de Silos to Picón Blanco. The first 111.8 kilometres (69.5 mi) was undulating and included the third-category climb of Puerto del Manquillo, which crested after 39.2 kilometres (24.4 mi). Afterwards, the terrain was mostly flat until the riders passed through the intermediate sprint in Medina de Pomar with 36.2 kilometres (22.5 mi) left. With 20 kilometres (12 mi) to go, the riders tackled the third-category Alto de Bocos, a 2.8-kilometre (1.7 mi) climb with an average gradient of 6.3 percent. There were bonus seconds on offer for the first three riders to cross the summit. After passing through Espinosa de los Monteros, the riders reached the foot of the final climb of Picón Blanco, a 7.6-kilometre (4.7 mi) long first-category climb with an average gradient of 9.3 percent.

Before the stage started, Frederik Frison (Lotto–Soudal) became the second rider to abandon after suffering from a high fever; the Belgian rider's COVID-19 tests had all come back negative. A few kilometres after the flag dropped, Ryan Gibbons (UAE Team Emirates) attempted to break away together with Antonio Jesús Soto (Euskaltel–Euskadi). After the two were brought back, Soto tried to break away again and this time, he was joined by seven other riders. The eight-man break extended their lead to three minutes before Team Jumbo–Visma took control at the front of the peloton. At the top of the Puerto del Manquillo, Kenny Elissonde (Trek–Segafredo) took maximum points to tie Sepp Kuss (Team Jumbo–Visma) for the lead of the mountains classification. Over the next few kilometres, the break's advantage ballooned to nine minutes, making it almost certain that the someone from the break would win the stage. At the intermediate sprint, Julen Amezqueta (Caja Rural–Seguros RGA) took maximum points. With other teams taking over at the front, the peloton began to set a furious pace, bringing the break's lead down to about four minutes. At the top of the Alto de Bocos, Tobias Bayer (Alpecin–Fenix) took maximum points, which, when added to the points he had previously accumulated in the stage, catapulted him to the top of the virtual KOM standings.

With 14 kilometres (8.7 mi) to go, Lilian Calmejane (AG2R Citroën Team) attacked off the front, building an advantage of 20 seconds before being chased down ahead of the final climb of Picón Blanco. At the bottom of the climb, the break began to split apart, with Amezqueta, Calmejane, Elissonde, Joe Dombrowski (UAE Team Emirates), and Rein Taaramäe (Intermarché–Wanty–Gobert Matériaux) remaining up front. 5 kilometres (3.1 mi) from the top, Dombrowski upped the pace in the break, bringing only Taaramäe and Elissonde with him. Further up the climb, Taaramäe dropped his companions, eventually soloing to the stage win. Dombrowski took second, 21 seconds down, while Elissonde finished 36 seconds behind. In the GC group, Team Bahrain Victorious set a steady tempo on the final climb. David de la Cruz (UAE Team Emirates) attacked but he was unable to build a gap. After losing time the previous day, Adam Yates (INEOS Grenadiers) put in a few digs but the headwind on the climb made it hard for the riders to create any gaps. Near the finish, Enric Mas (Movistar Team) accelerated from the group, gaining three seconds on a seven-man group of favourites. With the GC group crossing the line at almost two minutes behind Taaramäe, the Estonian became the new race leader and took the red jersey from Primož Roglič (Team Jumbo–Visma). With the 10 points Taaramäe took at the summit of Picón Blanco, he also became the new leader of the mountains classification and took the blue polka-dot jersey.

Some contenders lost contact with the GC group towards the top. De la Cruz lost 15 seconds to Mas while Hugh Carthy (EF Education–Nippo) conceded more than 20 seconds. Romain Bardet (Team DSM), Aleksandr Vlasov (Astana–Premier Tech), and Damiano Caruso (Team Bahrain Victorious) conceded 32 seconds to Mas while Richard Carapaz (INEOS Grenadiers) struggled and lost a minute. Additionally, Carapaz was handed a 20-second penalty for taking a feed out of the authorized zone.

Stage 3 Result
Rank	Rider	Team	Time
1	Rein Taaramäe (EST)	Intermarché–Wanty–Gobert Matériaux	5h 16' 57"
2	Joe Dombrowski (USA)	UAE Team Emirates	+ 21"
3	Kenny Elissonde (FRA)	Trek–Segafredo	+ 36"
4	Lilian Calmejane (FRA)	AG2R Citroën Team	+ 1' 16"
5	Enric Mas (ESP)	Movistar Team	+ 1' 45"
6	Miguel Ángel López (COL)	Movistar Team	+ 1' 48"
7	Primož Roglič (SLO)	Team Jumbo–Visma	+ 1' 48"
8	Adam Yates (GBR)	INEOS Grenadiers	+ 1' 48"
9	Mikel Landa (ESP)	Team Bahrain Victorious	+ 1' 48"
10	Giulio Ciccone (ITA)	Trek–Segafredo	+ 1' 48"

General classification after Stage 3
Rank	Rider	Team	Time
1	Rein Taaramäe (EST)	Intermarché–Wanty–Gobert Matériaux	9h 25' 44"
2	Kenny Elissonde (FRA)	Trek–Segafredo	+ 25"
3	Primož Roglič (SLO)	Team Jumbo–Visma	+ 30"
4	Lilian Calmejane (FRA)	AG2R Citroën Team	+ 35"
5	Enric Mas (ESP)	Movistar Team	+ 45"
6	Miguel Ángel López (COL)	Movistar Team	+ 51"
7	Alejandro Valverde (ESP)	Movistar Team	+ 57"
8	Giulio Ciccone (ITA)	Trek–Segafredo	+ 57"
9	Egan Bernal (COL)	INEOS Grenadiers	+ 57"
10	Mikel Landa (ESP)	Team Bahrain Victorious	+ 1' 09"

== Stage 4 ==
17 August 2021 – El Burgo de Osma to Molina de Aragón, 163.9 km (101.8 mi)

Stage 4 covered 163.9 kilometres (101.8 mi) from El Burgo de Osma to Molina de Aragón, travelling southeast through central Spain and leaving Castile and León. The undulating route had several hills but no categorised climbs, and it was expected to favour the sprinters. The only point of note along the stage was the intermediate sprint after 101 kilometres (63 mi) of racing, at the top of a small rise in Alcolea del Pinar; bonus seconds were also on offer for the first three riders to cross the sprint line. The final 5 kilometres (3.1 mi) began with a false flat up to 2 kilometres (1.2 mi) to go before a short descent into the final kilometre. The road then flattened out before a 400-metre (1,300 ft) uphill drag to the line with gradients between three and seven percent.

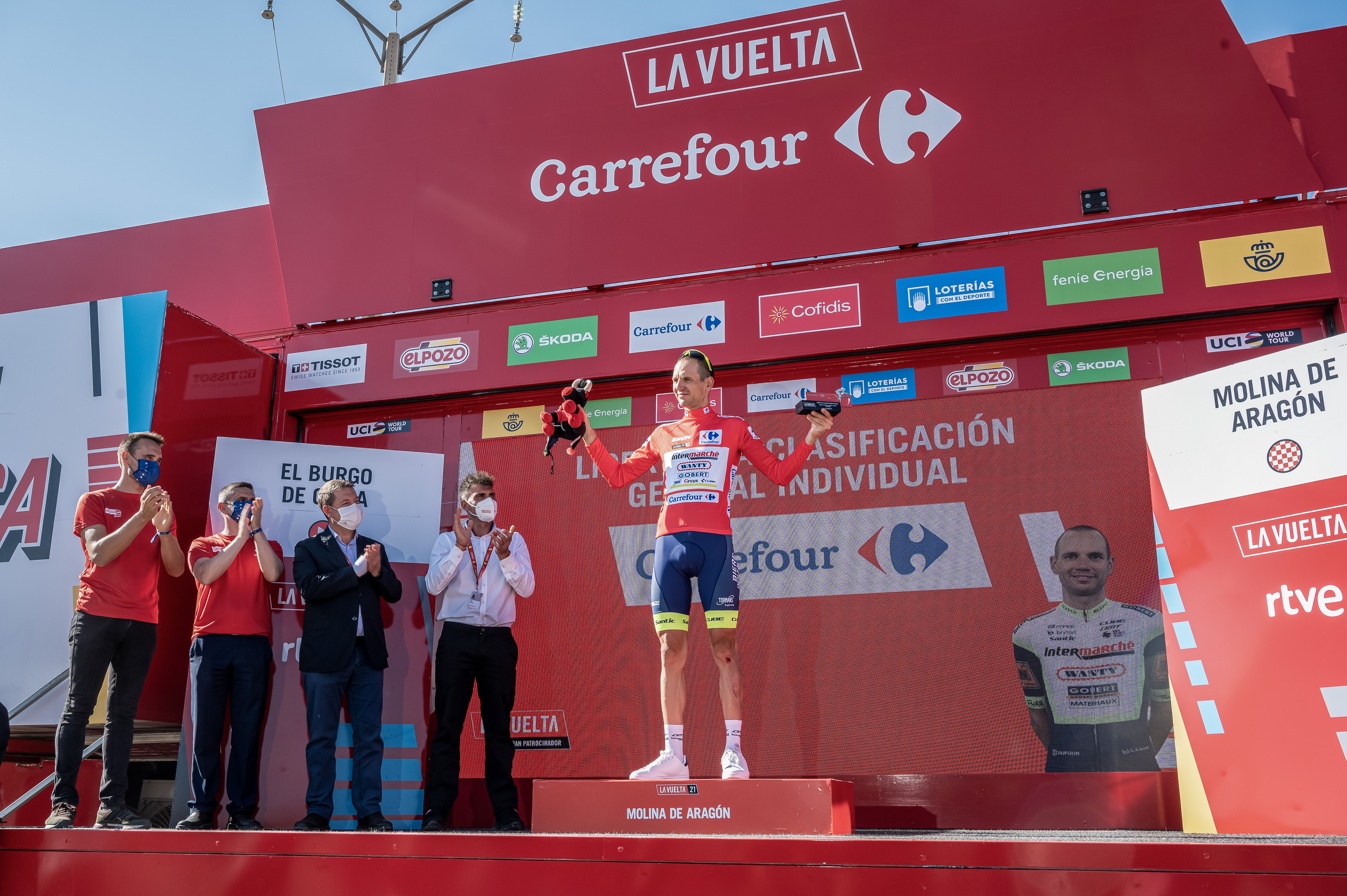
Rein Taaramäe in the red jersey after stage 4

Right from the start, a breakaway of three was formed. This trio consisted of three Spaniards, with Joan Bou (Euskaltel–Euskadi) being joined by the Burgos BH duo of Ángel Madrazo and Carlos Canal; Canal was the youngest rider in the race at 20 years and 50 days. The breakaway quickly built an advantage of almost three minutes, but at around 60 kilometres (37 mi) in, it had increased to a maximum of about four and a half minutes. At that point, the peloton began to close the gap ahead of the intermediate sprint, where Bou took maximum points ahead of Madrazo in second and Canal in third. In the peloton behind, Florian Sénéchal (Deceuninck–Quick-Step) took fourth ahead of the points classification leader, Jasper Philipsen (Alpecin–Fenix), to limit the losses for his teammate Fabio Jakobsen; Philipsen and Jakobsen were tied for the lead in that classification, with the former wearing the leader's green jersey by virtue of his stage 2 victory. The peloton gradually chased down the break before the trio was swept up with 13 kilometres (8.1 mi) to go, and among them, Madrazo was awarded the stage's combativity award. With 2.2 kilometres (1.4 mi) to go, race leader Rein Taaramäe (Intermarché–Wanty–Gobert Matériaux) went down near the back of the peloton, but he was able to get back up quickly. At the front of the peloton, Alpecin–Fenix, Deceuninck–Quick-Step, and Groupama–FDJ took control for their respective sprinters. In the finale, Sacha Modolo (Alpecin–Fenix) was the first to begin sprinting while looking behind for his teammate Philipsen, who was boxed in behind other sprinters. On the uphill sprint to the line, Groupama–FDJ led out their sprinter, Arnaud Démare, before Jakobsen emerged from his wheel in the final 75 metres (246 ft) to win the stage on the line. With the 50 points he gained at the finish, Jakobsen also took the lead in the points classification. Magnus Cort (EF Education–Nippo) finished third, while Philipsen settled for ninth.

Because Taaramäe's crash occurred in the final 3 kilometres (1.9 mi), he was credited with the same time as the peloton, thus retaining the red jersey and the lead in the general classification. The rest of the top 10 in the GC remained unchanged as everyone finished in the peloton.

Stage 4 Result
Rank	Rider	Team	Time
1	Fabio Jakobsen (NED)	Deceuninck–Quick-Step	3h 43' 07"
2	Arnaud Démare (FRA)	Groupama–FDJ	+ 0"
3	Magnus Cort (DEN)	EF Education–Nippo	+ 0"
4	Alberto Dainese (ITA)	Team DSM	+ 0"
5	Michael Matthews (AUS)	Team BikeExchange	+ 0"
6	Piet Allegaert (BEL)	Cofidis	+ 0"
7	Jordi Meeus (BEL)	Bora–Hansgrohe	+ 0"
8	Matteo Trentin (ITA)	UAE Team Emirates	+ 0"
9	Jasper Philipsen (BEL)	Alpecin–Fenix	+ 0"
10	Riccardo Minali (ITA)	Intermarché–Wanty–Gobert Matériaux	+ 0"

General classification after Stage 4
Rank	Rider	Team	Time
1	Rein Taaramäe (EST)	Intermarché–Wanty–Gobert Matériaux	13h 08' 51"
2	Kenny Elissonde (FRA)	Trek–Segafredo	+ 25"
3	Primož Roglič (SLO)	Team Jumbo–Visma	+ 30"
4	Lilian Calmejane (FRA)	AG2R Citroën Team	+ 35"
5	Enric Mas (ESP)	Movistar Team	+ 45"
6	Miguel Ángel López (COL)	Movistar Team	+ 51"
7	Alejandro Valverde (ESP)	Movistar Team	+ 57"
8	Giulio Ciccone (ITA)	Trek–Segafredo	+ 57"
9	Egan Bernal (COL)	INEOS Grenadiers	+ 57"
10	Mikel Landa (ESP)	Team Bahrain Victorious	+ 1' 09"

== Stage 5 ==
18 August 2021 – Tarancón to Albacete, 184.4 km (114.6 mi)

Stage 5

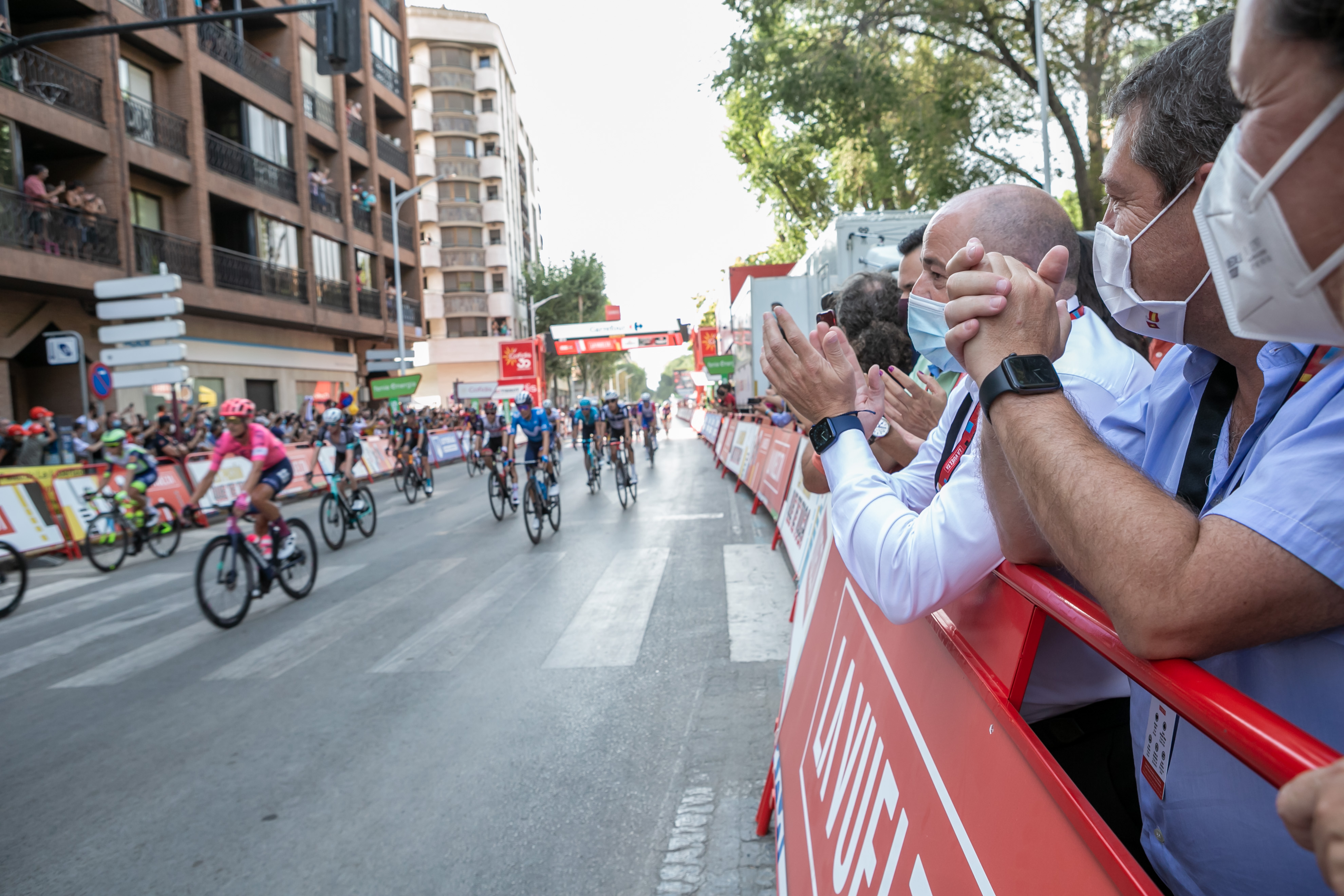
The peloton crossing the finish line in Albacete

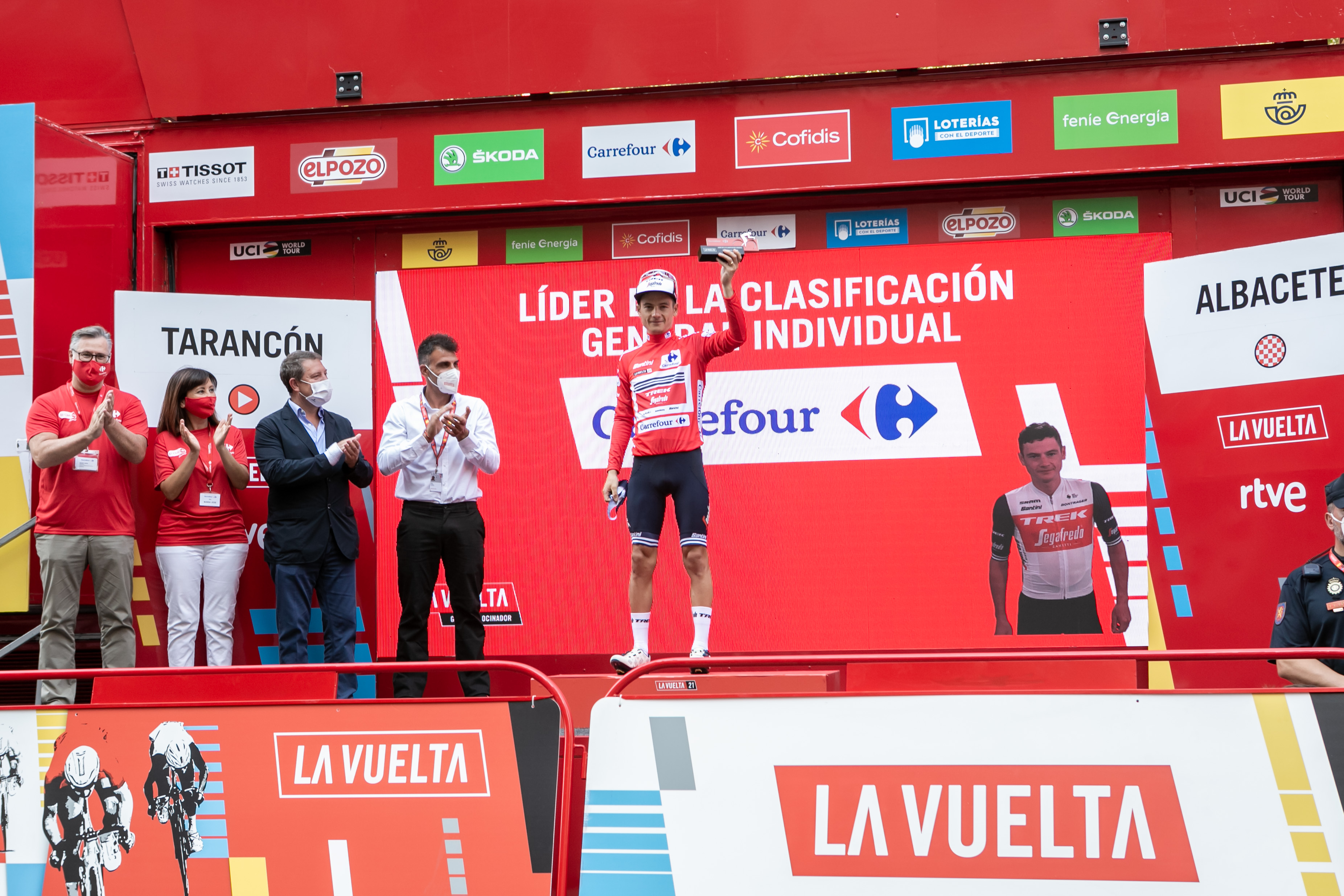
Kenny Elissonde being awarded the red jersey after the stage

The fifth stage of the race took the riders from Tarancón to Albacete with another stage that was expected to suit the sprinters, with the mostly flat route having no categorised climbs. The intermediate sprint took place in La Roda with 52.9 kilometres (32.9 mi) to go and offered bonus seconds to the first three riders across.

As soon as the flag dropped, Xabier Azparren (Euskaltel–Euskadi), Pelayo Sánchez (Burgos BH), and Oier Lazkano (Caja Rural–Seguros RGA) broke away from the peloton. The trio extended their lead to as much as seven minutes with Intermarché–Wanty–Gobert Matériaux taking control of the peloton. Deceuninck–Quick-Step, Alpecin–Fenix, and Groupama–FDJ soon brought riders to the front as the gap began to decrease. At the intermediate sprint, Lazkano took maximum points with Sánchez in second and Azparren in third. In the peloton, Jasper Philipsen (Alpecin–Fenix) sprinted ahead of Arnaud Démare (Groupama–FDJ) to edge closer to Fabio Jakobsen's (Deceuninck–Quick-Step) lead in the points classification. Sánchez was the first rider from the break to get dropped, and he was followed soon after by Azparren; this left only Lazkano out front, who would take the stage's combativity award.

The race soon headed inside the final 30 kilometres (19 mi) where there was a threat of crosswinds. Several teams tried to split the peloton into echelons but the wind was not strong enough to cause such splits. Lazkano was swept up by the peloton with 15.7 kilometres (9.8 mi) left. Around 11 kilometres (6.8 mi) from the finish, a big crash brought down several riders; chief among them were Romain Bardet (Team DSM) and the race leader, Rein Taaramäe (Intermarché–Wanty–Gobert Matériaux). All riders who crashed would eventually get back up. In the final sprint to the line, Philipsen was led out by his team as he took his second stage of the race ahead of Jakobsen. With the points he gained, Philipsen took the lead in the points classification by a solitary point. Taaramäe finished more than two minutes down while Bardet lost 12 minutes, dropping him out of GC contention. As a result of the former's time loss, second-placed Kenny Elissonde (Trek–Segafredo) became the new race leader and took the red jersey.

Stage 5 Result
Rank	Rider	Team	Time
1	Jasper Philipsen (BEL)	Alpecin–Fenix	4h 24' 41"
2	Fabio Jakobsen (NED)	Deceuninck–Quick-Step	+ 0"
3	Alberto Dainese (ITA)	Team DSM	+ 0"
4	Juan Sebastián Molano (COL)	UAE Team Emirates	+ 0"
5	Piet Allegaert (BEL)	Cofidis	+ 0"
6	Jon Aberasturi (ESP)	Caja Rural–Seguros RGA	+ 0"
7	Jordi Meeus (BEL)	Bora–Hansgrohe	+ 0"
8	Riccardo Minali (ITA)	Intermarché–Wanty–Gobert Matériaux	+ 0"
9	Reinardt Janse van Rensburg (RSA)	Team Qhubeka NextHash	+ 0"
10	Arnaud Démare (FRA)	Groupama–FDJ	+ 0"

General classification after Stage 5
Rank	Rider	Team	Time
1	Kenny Elissonde (FRA)	Trek–Segafredo	17h 33' 57"
2	Primož Roglič (SLO)	Team Jumbo–Visma	+ 5"
3	Lilian Calmejane (FRA)	AG2R Citroën Team	+ 10"
4	Enric Mas (ESP)	Movistar Team	+ 20"
5	Miguel Ángel López (COL)	Movistar Team	+ 26"
6	Alejandro Valverde (ESP)	Movistar Team	+ 32"
7	Giulio Ciccone (ITA)	Trek–Segafredo	+ 32"
8	Egan Bernal (COL)	INEOS Grenadiers	+ 32"
9	Mikel Landa (ESP)	Team Bahrain Victorious	+ 44"
10	Gino Mäder (SUI)	Team Bahrain Victorious	+ 45"

== Stage 6 ==
19 August 2021 – Requena to Alto de Cullera, 158.3 km (98.4 mi)

Stage 6 featured a 158.3-kilometre (98.4 mi) route from Requena to Cullera that finished atop the third-category climb of the Alto de la Montaña de Cullera. The first 82 kilometres (51 mi) featured several short uncategorised climbs but were net downhill as the riders headed east towards Valencia and the Mediterranean coast. Once there, the route then turned south along the coast, with an intermediate sprint after 98.5 kilometres (61.2 mi) in Pinedo on the Valencian outskirts, with bonus seconds also on offer for the first three riders across. The rest of the stage was almost entirely pan-flat until the final 2.4 kilometres (1.5 mi) when riders reached the foot of the finishing climb. The Alto de la Montaña de Cullera proper started at 1.9 kilometres (1.2 mi) to go, with an average gradient of 9.4 percent.

Several riders attempted to get into the breakaway but no one was able to get away for the first 50 kilometres (31 mi) of the stage. The first riders to build a gap were Joan Bou (Euskaltel–Euskadi) and Ryan Gibbons (UAE Team Emirates). A three-man chase group of Jetse Bol (Burgos BH), Magnus Cort (EF Education–Nippo), and Bert-Jan Lindeman (Team Qhubeka NextHash) managed to bridge up to the duo and the peloton was content to let the quintet go. Guy Niv (Israel Start-Up Nation) also attempted to join the break unsuccessfully and he rejoined the peloton shortly thereafter. The quintet led by as much as seven minutes before Team BikeExchange began to chase from the peloton. At the intermediate sprint, Bol took maximum points while the peloton passed through at around three and a half minutes down. With around 34 kilometres (21 mi) to go, echelons began to form in the peloton as the wind picked up. Most of the contenders made it to the front with the exception of Adam Yates (INEOS Grenadiers) and Hugh Carthy (EF Education–Nippo) while the race leader, Kenny Elissonde (Trek–Segafredo), was also among those caught out. The peloton would eventually reform with 27 kilometres (17 mi) to go.

13 kilometres (8.1 mi) from the finish, Carthy was dropped off the back of the peloton. He found himself almost 30 seconds behind at one point but with the help of his teammates, he managed to get back with around 7 kilometres (4.3 mi) to go. With Movistar Team and INEOS Grenadiers chasing in the peloton, the break started the final climb with a lead of only 20 seconds. Near the bottom of the climb, Elissonde was dropped by the peloton. The lead quintet began to split on the climb, with Cort emerging as the strongest from the break as he soloed off the front. Inside the final 500 metres (1,600 ft), Michael Matthews (Team BikeExchange) attacked from the peloton, followed immediately by Aleksandr Vlasov (Astana–Premier Tech). After Matthews and Vlasov were caught, Primož Roglič (Team Jumbo–Visma) kicked clear with Andrea Bagioli (Deceuninck–Quick-Step) close behind, but Cort held off Roglič on the line to take the stage win.

Vlasov and Enric Mas (Movistar Team) finished four seconds down while Egan Bernal (INEOS Grenadiers) and the Movistar Team duo of Miguel Ángel López and Alejandro Valverde finished almost ten seconds down. Yates, David de la Cruz (UAE Team Emirates), and Giulio Ciccone (Trek–Segafredo) conceded more than 20 seconds while a group containing Fabio Aru (Team Qhubeka NextHash), Mikel Landa (Team Bahrain Victorious), and Richard Carapaz (INEOS Grenadiers) lost 27 seconds. Carthy suffered the most and conceded almost three minutes. With Elissonde finishing four and a half minutes back, Roglič took back the red jersey, while the Movistar Team trio of Mas, López, and Valverde moved into second to fourth, respectively. Bernal rounded out the top five on the same time as Valverde.

Stage 6 Result
Rank	Rider	Team	Time
1	Magnus Cort (DEN)	EF Education–Nippo	3h 30' 53"
2	Primož Roglič (SLO)	Team Jumbo–Visma	+ 0"
3	Andrea Bagioli (ITA)	Deceuninck–Quick-Step	+ 2"
4	Aleksandr Vlasov (RUS)	Astana–Premier Tech	+ 4"
5	Enric Mas (ESP)	Movistar Team	+ 4"
6	Michael Matthews (AUS)	Team BikeExchange	+ 6"
7	Egan Bernal (COL)	INEOS Grenadiers	+ 8"
8	Alejandro Valverde (ESP)	Movistar Team	+ 8"
9	Miguel Ángel López (COL)	Movistar Team	+ 9"
10	Felix Großschartner (AUT)	Bora–Hansgrohe	+ 16"

General classification after Stage 6
Rank	Rider	Team	Time
1	Primož Roglič (SLO)	Team Jumbo–Visma	21h 04' 49"
2	Enric Mas (ESP)	Movistar Team	+ 25"
3	Miguel Ángel López (COL)	Movistar Team	+ 36"
4	Alejandro Valverde (ESP)	Movistar Team	+ 41"
5	Egan Bernal (COL)	INEOS Grenadiers	+ 41"
6	Aleksandr Vlasov (RUS)	Astana–Premier Tech	+ 53"
7	Giulio Ciccone (ITA)	Trek–Segafredo	+ 58"
8	Lilian Calmejane (FRA)	AG2R Citroën Team	+ 1' 04"
9	Mikel Landa (ESP)	Team Bahrain Victorious	+ 1' 12"
10	Fabio Aru (ITA)	Team Qhubeka NextHash	+ 1' 17"

== Stage 7 ==
20 August 2021 – Gandía to Balcón de Alicante, 152 km (94 mi)

The seventh stage featured another uphill finish as the riders travelled from Gandia to Balcón de Alicante. The stage featured six categorized climbs with the first of these, the first-category Puerto La Llacuna, coming after just 7 kilometres (4.3 mi). The climb was 9.4 kilometres (5.8 mi) long with an average gradient of 6.2 percent. Following the descent and a short flat section, the road gradually went uphill before the riders reached the foot of the third-category Puerto de Benilloba, a 3-kilometre (1.9 mi) climb with an average gradient of 3.5 percent, followed immediately by the second-category Puerto de Tudons, a 7.4-kilometre (4.6 mi) climb with an average gradient of 5.2 percent. A descent and a short uphill section led to the intermediate sprint in Relleu with 50 kilometres (31 mi) left to race. The sprint was followed immediately by the second-category Puerto El Collao, a 9.5-kilometre (5.9 mi) climb with an average gradient of 4.6 percent. After the descent, the riders headed to the third-category Puerto de Tibi, a 5.3-kilometre (3.3 mi) climb with an average gradient of 5.3 percent. The top, crested with 13.7 kilometres (8.5 mi) to go, offered bonus seconds to the first three riders across. Another short descent led to the final climb of the day, the first-category Balcón de Alicante, an 8.4-kilometre (5.2 mi) climb with an average gradient of 6.2 percent. The final 4 kilometres (2.5 mi) featured gradients of over 10 percent while the finish line came after a short 300-metre (980 ft) downhill section at the top.

As soon as the flag dropped, a group of seven riders tried to pull away but they were caught at the bottom of the first climb. Several riders attacked on the climb but no one was able to build a gap over the peloton. Near the top, the peloton split into three groups, with most of the contenders included in the second group. The only exception was Hugh Carthy (EF Education–Nippo), who was dropped on the steep part of the climb; he would eventually abandon the race. At the top, Jack Haig (Team Bahrain Victorious) took maximum points to tie with Rein Taaramäe (Intermarché–Wanty–Gobert Matériaux) at the top of the KOM standings. The GC group bridged up to the front group on the descent, prompting more riders to go on the attack. It was not until a group of six riders broke away with around 118 kilometres (73 mi) to go that the GC group began to settle down. The easing of the pace allowed some dropped riders to get back to the GC group. However, UAE Team Emirates, having missed the break, began to chase with Matteo Trentin. His pace took 22 other riders with him, splitting themselves from the group of favourites. The chase group bridged up to the front with 97 kilometres (60 mi) left to make it 29 riders in the break.

Over the next two climbs, Romain Bardet (Team DSM) and Jan Polanc (UAE Team Emirates) took maximum points for the KOM while Team Jumbo–Visma set a steady pace in the peloton. On the climb of Puerto El Collao, the Team DSM duo of Chris Hamilton and Michael Storer launched separate attacks from the break but they were both caught. At the top, Bardet took maximum points to take the lead in the KOM competition. On the descent, Lawson Craddock (EF Education–Nippo) pulled away from the break before eventually being caught by Storer and Pavel Sivakov (INEOS Grenadiers). On the climb of Puerto de Tibi, Sivakov dropped his chain while Storer dropped Craddock. Sivakov eventually made his way back to Storer on the climb while Craddock made his way back on the descent. On the final climb of the day, Craddock was dropped for good while Carlos Verona (Movistar Team) and Andreas Kron (Lotto–Soudal) made their way up front. With 4 kilometres (2.5 mi) to go, Verona accelerated, dropping Kron while Storer and Sivakov slowly made their way back. 3.3 kilometres (2.1 mi) from the finish, Storer attacked, dropping both Sivakov and Verona. He gradually built his lead to solo to the stage win. Verona dropped Sivakov to finish second while Sivakov held on for third. Sivakov did, however, take the blue polka-dot jersey as leader of the KOM competition.

Meanwhile, in the GC group, Team Jumbo–Visma was content to let the break go. On the Puerto El Collao, Alejandro Valverde (Movistar Team) launched an attack, followed by the INEOS Grenadiers duo of Adam Yates and Richard Carapaz. However, just before the group was caught, Valverde crashed heavily on a bend. He tried to ride on, but he would eventually abandon. Miguel Ángel López (Movistar Team) also attacked on the climb, followed by Carapaz and the race leader Primož Roglič (Team Jumbo–Visma). The move would eventually get shut down. On the final climb, Yates put in a few digs, with Roglič, López, Enric Mas (Movistar Team), Egan Bernal (INEOS Grenadiers), David de la Cruz (UAE Team Emirates), and Louis Meintjes (Intermarché–Wanty–Gobert Matériaux) the riders able to stay with him to the finish. Aleksandr Vlasov (Astana–Premier Tech) lost 13 seconds while a group containing Carapaz, Giulio Ciccone (Trek–Segafredo), Fabio Aru (Team Qhubeka NextHash), and Mikel Landa (Team Bahrain Victorious) conceded half a minute.

In the GC, Roglič narrowly held on to the red jersey by eight seconds over Felix Großschartner (Bora–Hansgrohe), who was in the break. Mas, López, and Bernal were still 25, 36, and 41 seconds down, respectively. Polanc, Haig, and Sepp Kuss (Team Jumbo–Visma) also moved into the top ten after being in the break.

Stage 7 Result
Rank	Rider	Team	Time
1	Michael Storer (AUS)	Team DSM	4h 10' 13"
2	Carlos Verona (ESP)	Movistar Team	+ 21"
3	Pavel Sivakov (RUS)	INEOS Grenadiers	+ 59"
4	Sepp Kuss (USA)	Team Jumbo–Visma	+ 1' 16"
5	Jack Haig (AUS)	Team Bahrain Victorious	+ 1' 24"
6	Romain Bardet (FRA)	Team DSM	+ 1' 32"
7	Felix Großschartner (AUT)	Bora–Hansgrohe	+ 1' 32"
8	Andreas Kron (DEN)	Lotto–Soudal	+ 1' 37"
9	Steff Cras (BEL)	Lotto–Soudal	+ 2' 17"
10	Jan Polanc (SLO)	UAE Team Emirates	+ 2' 29"

General classification after Stage 7
Rank	Rider	Team	Time
1	Primož Roglič (SLO)	Team Jumbo–Visma	25h 18' 35"
2	Felix Großschartner (AUT)	Bora–Hansgrohe	+ 8"
3	Enric Mas (ESP)	Movistar Team	+ 25"
4	Miguel Ángel López (COL)	Movistar Team	+ 36"
5	Jan Polanc (SLO)	UAE Team Emirates	+ 38"
6	Egan Bernal (COL)	INEOS Grenadiers	+ 41"
7	Jack Haig (AUS)	Team Bahrain Victorious	+ 57"
8	Sepp Kuss (USA)	Team Jumbo–Visma	+ 59"
9	Aleksandr Vlasov (RUS)	Astana–Premier Tech	+ 1' 06"
10	Adam Yates (GBR)	INEOS Grenadiers	+ 1' 22"

== Stage 8 ==
21 August 2021 – Santa Pola to La Manga del Mar Menor, 173.7 km (107.9 mi)

The eighth stage featured another chance for the sprinters as the riders took on a flat stage from Santa Pola to La Manga del Mar Menor. The first part of the stage was mostly flat before the riders passed through the intermediate sprint in Cartagena with 69.2 kilometres (43.0 mi) left. Afterwards, there were two short uncategorized climbs which offered a chance for the riders to drop the pure sprinters before a flat run-in to the finish.

Three Spanish riders, Ander Okamika (Burgos BH), Aritz Bagües (Caja Rural–Seguros RGA), and Mikel Iturria (Euskaltel–Euskadi), attacked at the start of the day. They built a maximum lead of around almost four minutes before Deceuninck–Quick-Step and Alpecin–Fenix sent riders to the front of the peloton to gradually decrease the break's lead. At the intermediate sprint, Bagües took maximum points with Iturria in second and Okamika in third. In the peloton, Jasper Philipsen (Alpecin–Fenix) passed through the intermediate sprint ahead of Arnaud Démare (Groupama–FDJ) to extend his lead in the points classification. With around 38 kilometres (24 mi) to go, Astana–Premier Tech set a furious pace in the bunch as they tried to form echelons with the threat of crosswinds. The pace led to the breakaway riders getting swept up, and to the peloton splitting into three groups. The pace eventually eased up, allowing many of the dropped riders to make it back to the front. With 2 kilometres (1.2 mi) to go, Jetse Bol (Burgos BH) accelerated off the front but he was quickly brought back by the surging peloton. In the final sprint to the line, Fabio Jakobsen (Deceuninck–Quick-Step) launched his sprint with 200 metres (660 ft) left and held off the other sprinters to take his second stage win of the race. Alberto Dainese (Team DSM) crossed the line in second while Philipsen finished third. With his win, Jakobsen took back the green jersey from Philipsen. The top ten remained unchanged as Primož Roglič (Team Jumbo–Visma) kept the red jersey.

Stage 8 Result
Rank	Rider	Team	Time
1	Fabio Jakobsen (NED)	Deceuninck–Quick-Step	3h 56' 05"
2	Alberto Dainese (ITA)	Team DSM	+ 0"
3	Jasper Philipsen (BEL)	Alpecin–Fenix	+ 0"
4	Jordi Meeus (BEL)	Bora–Hansgrohe	+ 0"
5	Itamar Einhorn (ISR)	Israel Start-Up Nation	+ 0"
6	Arnaud Démare (FRA)	Groupama–FDJ	+ 0"
7	Michael Matthews (AUS)	Team BikeExchange	+ 0"
8	Martin Laas (EST)	Bora–Hansgrohe	+ 0"
9	Piet Allegaert (BEL)	Cofidis	+ 0"
10	Jon Aberasturi (ESP)	Caja Rural–Seguros RGA	+ 0"

General classification after Stage 8
Rank	Rider	Team	Time
1	Primož Roglič (SLO)	Team Jumbo–Visma	29h 14' 40"
2	Felix Großschartner (AUT)	Bora–Hansgrohe	+ 8"
3	Enric Mas (ESP)	Movistar Team	+ 25"
4	Miguel Ángel López (COL)	Movistar Team	+ 36"
5	Jan Polanc (SLO)	UAE Team Emirates	+ 38"
6	Egan Bernal (COL)	INEOS Grenadiers	+ 41"
7	Jack Haig (AUS)	Team Bahrain Victorious	+ 57"
8	Sepp Kuss (USA)	Team Jumbo–Visma	+ 59"
9	Aleksandr Vlasov (RUS)	Astana–Premier Tech	+ 1' 06"
10	Adam Yates (GBR)	INEOS Grenadiers	+ 1' 22"

== Stage 9 ==
22 August 2021 – Puerto Lumbreras to Alto de Velefique, 188 km (117 mi)

The last stage before the first rest day featured another mountainous course, with the riders finishing at the summit of the Alto de Velefique. The first 19.4 kilometres (12.1 mi) went downhill before the riders gradually climbed towards the second-category Alto de Cuatro Vientos, a 10.5-kilometre (6.5 mi) climb with an average gradient of 3.8 percent. Following the descent, the riders climbed towards the intermediate sprint in Tijola with 86.8 kilometres (53.9 mi) still to race. Afterwards, the riders immediately started the first-category climb of Alto Collado Venta Luisa. The climb, which was the longest in this year's Vuelta, is 29 kilometres (18 mi) long with an average gradient of 4.4 percent. Towards the top, there was a 6-kilometre (3.7 mi) section which averages 9.2 percent in gradient. The descent led to the foot of the third-category Alto de Castro de Filabres, a 7.1-kilometre (4.4 mi) long climb with an average gradient of 3.9 percent, with bonus seconds offered to the first three riders over at the top. After the descent, the riders reached the foot of the final climb, the special category Alto de Velefique. The climb, which is 13.2 kilometres (8.2 mi) long with an average gradient of 6.4 percent, featured sections of over 10 percent gradient for the first 5 kilometres (3.1 mi) before easing to around six to seven percent in the final 8 kilometres (5.0 mi).

Multiple riders attempted to break away but the fast pace in the peloton meant that no break was established until 99 kilometres (62 mi) to go, when until a group of seven riders went away. That group swelled to 11 after four more riders bridged across. The break built a lead of almost four minutes before INEOS Grenadiers set a furious pace on the Alto Collado Venta Luisa. As the break's lead decreased to around a minute, Damiano Caruso (Team Bahrain Victorious) accelerated off the front of the break with 71 kilometres (44 mi) to go. Romain Bardet (Team DSM) tried unsuccessfully to bridge up to Caruso as the Italian gradually built his lead over the rest of the break. INEOS Grenadiers soon set a steady pace in the peloton, allowing Caruso to extend his lead to two minutes over the peloton at the top of the climb, while the chasing group, which had been reduced to four riders, crossed the top at a minute and a half behind Caruso. Bardet took second at the top to take over the lead in the mountains classification.

Following the descent, Geoffrey Bouchard (AG2R Citroën Team) attacked from the peloton, eventually bridging up to the chase group composed of Bardet, Julen Amezqueta (Caja Rural–Seguros RGA), and Rafał Majka (UAE Team Emirates). Just before the penultimate climb of the Alto de Castro de Filabres, Caruso extended his lead over the chasers to two minutes while INEOS Grenadiers stopped pulling in the peloton, allowing Caruso's lead over the peloton to balloon to over four minutes. He gradually extended his lead over the chasers over the rest of the stage to solo to the stage win. By taking maximum points at the summit of the Alto de Velefique, Caruso took over the lead in the mountains classification.

In the GC group, Team Jumbo–Visma set a steady pace as they headed towards the foot of the final climb. Around 11 kilometres (6.8 mi) from the top, Mikel Landa (Team Bahrain Victorious) struggled to follow the pace set by INEOS Grenadiers, which had taken over again at the front of the peloton; he would eventually lose five minutes by the end of the day. On the climb's steepest section, Adam Yates (INEOS Grenadiers) accelerated, with Miguel Ángel López (Movistar Team) following him. Primož Roglič (Team Jumbo–Visma) soon bridged up to the duo, bringing Egan Bernal (INEOS Grenadiers) and Enric Mas (Movistar Team) with him. After the pace eased for a while, Yates put in a few more digs, splitting the GC group and catching the remnants of the breakaway with the exception of Caruso. Only Roglič and Mas were able to follow his last attack before the duo were able to drop Yates with around 4 kilometres (2.5 mi) to go. Roglič and Mas worked together to extend their lead over a chase group consisting of Yates, Bernal, López, and Jack Haig (Team Bahrain Victorious). Towards the top, Bernal was dropped from the chase group. At the line, Roglič took second, gapping Mas by a second and gaining two additional bonus seconds. Yates, Haig, and López finished 39 seconds behind Roglič while Bernal, Giulio Ciccone (Trek–Segafredo), and Gino Mäder (Team Bahrain Victorious) crossed the line more than a minute down. In the GC, Roglič extended his lead to 28 seconds over Mas, the only rider within a minute of the Slovenian's lead. López rounded out the podium at 1' 21" down while Haig moved up to fourth at 1' 42" behind. Bernal rounded out the top five at 1' 52" down with his teammate, Yates, a further 15 seconds in arrears.

Stage 9 Result
Rank	Rider	Team	Time
1	Damiano Caruso (ITA)	Team Bahrain Victorious	5h 03' 14"
2	Primož Roglič (SLO)	Team Jumbo–Visma	+ 1' 05"
3	Enric Mas (ESP)	Movistar Team	+ 1' 06"
4	Jack Haig (AUS)	Team Bahrain Victorious	+ 1' 44"
5	Miguel Ángel López (COL)	Movistar Team	+ 1' 44"
6	Adam Yates (GBR)	INEOS Grenadiers	+ 1' 44"
7	Gino Mäder (SUI)	Team Bahrain Victorious	+ 2' 07"
8	Giulio Ciccone (ITA)	Trek–Segafredo	+ 2' 10"
9	Egan Bernal (COL)	INEOS Grenadiers	+ 2' 10"
10	David de la Cruz (ESP)	UAE Team Emirates	+ 2' 40"

General classification after Stage 9
Rank	Rider	Team	Time
1	Primož Roglič (SLO)	Team Jumbo–Visma	34h 18' 53"
2	Enric Mas (ESP)	Movistar Team	+ 28"
3	Miguel Ángel López (COL)	Movistar Team	+ 1' 21"
4	Jack Haig (AUS)	Team Bahrain Victorious	+ 1' 42"
5	Egan Bernal (COL)	INEOS Grenadiers	+ 1' 52"
6	Adam Yates (GBR)	INEOS Grenadiers	+ 2' 07"
7	Giulio Ciccone (ITA)	Trek–Segafredo	+ 2' 39"
8	Sepp Kuss (USA)	Team Jumbo–Visma	+ 2' 40"
9	Felix Großschartner (AUT)	Bora–Hansgrohe	+ 3' 25"
10	David de la Cruz (ESP)	UAE Team Emirates	+ 3' 55"

== Rest day 1 ==
23 August 2021 – Almería

== Stage 10 ==
24 August 2021 – Roquetas de Mar to Rincón de la Victoria, 189 km (117 mi)

The tenth stage of the race took the riders from Roquetas de Mar to Rincón de la Victoria. Most of the stage featured rolling terrain with several small uncategorised hills along the way. The intermediate sprint took place in Torre del Mar with 40.3 kilometres (25.0 mi) to go. 27.3 kilometres (17.0 mi) from the finish, the riders took on the only categorized climb of the day, the second-category Puerto de Almáchar. The climb was 10.9 kilometres (6.8 mi) in length with an average gradient of 4.9 percent but the final 4.5 kilometres (2.8 mi) featured an average gradient of over 9 percent and some sections over 10 percent. At the summit, bonus seconds were on offer for the first three riders to cross, before a 16.4-kilometre (10.2 mi) technical descent led to the finish in Rincón de la Victoria.

The start of the stage featured another furious fight for the break as several riders attempted to pull away. A trio composed of Florian Sénéchal (Deceuninck–Quick-Step), Jordi Meeus (Bora–Hansgrohe), and Jan Tratnik (Team Bahrain Victorious) briefly got away but they were caught after 40 kilometres (25 mi) of racing. The pace remained high until a group of 31 riders broke away after more than 70 kilometres (43 mi) of racing. The best-placed riders on GC in the break were Odd Christian Eiking (Intermarché–Wanty–Gobert Matériaux) at 9' 10" down at the start of the day, with Guillaume Martin (Cofidis) a further 29 seconds behind. The large group immediately built their advantage as Team Jumbo–Visma began to control the peloton. Shortly after passing through the intermediate sprint, Matteo Trentin (UAE Team Emirates), Alex Aranburu (Astana–Premier Tech), Jesús Herrada (Cofidis), and Floris De Tier (Alpecin–Fenix) attacked from the break. The quartet reached the foot of the Puerto de Almáchar with a lead of almost half a minute.

On the climb itself, De Tier tried to attack off the front but was caught by the chasers along with Aranburu, Trentin, and Herrada. Rui Oliveira (UAE Team Emirates) was the next to make a move before he was followed by Kenny Elissonde (Trek–Segafredo). Both riders were caught by the other chasers, which had splintered on the climb. Towards the top, Michael Storer (Team DSM) attacked off the front. Clément Champoussin (AG2R Citroën Team) tried to follow unsuccessfully, while Storer gradually built his gap to around 40 seconds by the summit. On the descent, Champoussin was caught by Eiking, Mauri Vansevenant (Deceuninck–Quick-Step), and Dylan van Baarle (INEOS Grenadiers). They came to within 20 seconds of catching Storer but the Australian held on to take his second stage win of the race. The first group of chasers finished 22 seconds later.

In the GC group, Team Jumbo–Visma gradually let the break increase their lead to more than 13 minutes, which meant that Eiking was the virtual GC leader for much of the day. On the steepest section of the Puerto de Almáchar, race leader Primož Roglič (Team Jumbo–Visma) accelerated from the group. No one was able to follow him immediately while a group of chasers composed of Jack Haig (Team Bahrain Victorious) and the Movistar Team duo of Enric Mas and Miguel Ángel López formed behind. Roglič's teammate, Sepp Kuss, was also able to follow the chasers before he was eventually dropped. The INEOS Grenadiers duo of Egan Bernal and Adam Yates struggled as they were unable to follow the moves, while Roglič led by around 20 seconds over the top of the climb. On the descent, Roglič's rear wheel slipped during a turn, causing him to crash. Though he was immediately able to get back up, his small advantage had evaporated and he was soon caught by Mas, López, and Haig. Near the finish, Kuss, Aleksandr Vlasov (Astana–Premier Tech), and Felix Großschartner (Bora–Hansgrohe) managed to bridge up to the quartet. They crossed the line at almost 12 minutes behind Storer while Bernal, Yates, and several other contenders finished a further 37 seconds in arrears. As a result of his time gain over Roglič, Eiking took the red jersey by a margin of 58 seconds over Guillaume Martin, who moved up to second, while Roglič led the rest of the GC contenders at 2' 17" down.

Stage 10 Result
Rank	Rider	Team	Time
1	Michael Storer (AUS)	Team DSM	4h 09' 21"
2	Mauri Vansevenant (BEL)	Deceuninck–Quick-Step	+ 22"
3	Clément Champoussin (FRA)	AG2R Citroën Team	+ 22"
4	Dylan van Baarle (NED)	INEOS Grenadiers	+ 22"
5	Odd Christian Eiking (NOR)	Intermarché–Wanty–Gobert Matériaux	+ 22"
6	Jhonatan Narváez (ECU)	INEOS Grenadiers	+ 51"
7	Nick Schultz (AUS)	Team BikeExchange	+ 51"
8	Geoffrey Bouchard (FRA)	AG2R Citroën Team	+ 51"
9	Lilian Calmejane (FRA)	AG2R Citroën Team	+ 51"
10	Kenny Elissonde (FRA)	Trek–Segafredo	+ 51"

General classification after Stage 10
Rank	Rider	Team	Time
1	Odd Christian Eiking (NOR)	Intermarché–Wanty–Gobert Matériaux	38h 37' 46"
2	Guillaume Martin (FRA)	Cofidis	+ 58"
3	Primož Roglič (SLO)	Team Jumbo–Visma	+ 2' 17"
4	Enric Mas (ESP)	Movistar Team	+ 2' 45"
5	Miguel Ángel López (COL)	Movistar Team	+ 3' 38"
6	Jack Haig (AUS)	Team Bahrain Victorious	+ 3' 59"
7	Egan Bernal (COL)	INEOS Grenadiers	+ 4' 46"
8	Sepp Kuss (USA)	Team Jumbo–Visma	+ 4' 57"
9	Adam Yates (GBR)	INEOS Grenadiers	+ 5' 01"
10	Felix Großschartner (AUT)	Bora–Hansgrohe	+ 5' 42"

== Stage 11 ==
25 August 2021 – Antequera to Valdepeñas de Jaén, 133.6 km (83.0 mi)

The eleventh stage featured a hilly stage as the riders headed towards an uphill finish in Valdepeñas de Jaén, which has previously hosted stage finishes in 2010, 2011, and 2013. The first 41 kilometres (25 mi) of the stage featured undulating terrain before the riders tackled short hills and several uncategorized climbs over the next 76 kilometres (47 mi). The intermediate sprint took place in Alcalá la Real with 31.1 kilometres (19.3 mi) left. 16.6 kilometres (10.3 mi) from the finish, the riders took on the second-category Puerto de Locubín, an 8.8-kilometre (5.5 mi) climb with an average gradient of 5 percent, which offered bonus seconds to the first three riders over the summit. A short descent led to the final kilometre where the riders headed uphill to the finish in Valdepeñas de Jaén. The final kilometre had an average gradient of around 9 percent but featured gradients of more than 20 percent.

Before the stage started, Alpecin–Fenix announced that Jasper Philipsen, who had won two sprint stages and was in contention for the points classification, had withdrawn from the race due to a mild fever. Alex Aranburu (Astana–Premier Tech) also withdrew following a crash the previous day. After the flag dropped, it took around 30 kilometres (19 mi) before a group of five broke away from the peloton. The group contained Edward Planckaert (Alpecin–Fenix), Jonathan Lastra (Caja Rural–Seguros RGA), Magnus Cort (EF Education–Nippo), Joan Bou (Euskaltel–Euskadi), and Harm Vanhoucke (Lotto–Soudal). After the break was formed, Burgos BH, having missed the break, attempted to bring the quintet back but they were unable to do so. The break's lead stabilized to only around two minutes as Team Jumbo–Visma and Team BikeExchange kept them on a tight leash. Their advantage hovered between one and two minutes before finally coming down below a minute as the riders neared the Puerto de Locubín.

On the climb, Cort dropped his breakaway companions with Vanhoucke hovering between Cort and the chasing peloton. Vanhoucke was caught with around 12 kilometres (7.5 mi) to go before David de la Cruz (UAE Team Emirates) attacked 2 kilometres (1.2 mi) later. Cort summited with a lead of around 20 seconds; behind de la Cruz was caught at the top of the climb by the peloton as mountains classification leader Damiano Caruso made a surge to add three more points to his lead. Cort maintained his advantage on the descent, eventually reaching the final kilometre with a lead of just under 20 seconds. In the peloton, (Team Jumbo–Visma) led out for Primož Roglič, who soon took to the front with Enric Mas (Movistar Team). The duo pulled away before slowing down with around 500 metres (1,600 ft) to go, riding side-by-side. They passed Cort with 200 metres (660 ft) left, and in the sprint to the line, Roglič pulled away from Mas to take his second stage win of the race. Mas finished in second at three seconds behind while his teammate, Miguel Ángel López, took third at five seconds down. Jack Haig (Team Bahrain Victorious) led in a group at seven seconds down while Egan Bernal (INEOS Grenadiers) and race leader Odd Christian Eiking (Intermarché–Wanty–Gobert Matériaux) finished in a group a further four seconds in arrears.

In the GC, Eiking maintained his 58-second advantage over Guillaume Martin (Cofidis). Roglič extended his advantage over Mas to 35 seconds with López at 1' 32" behind the Slovenian. Haig, Bernal, and Adam Yates also maintained their respective positions, though each with a slightly larger deficit to Roglič.

Stage 11 Result
Rank	Rider	Team	Time
1	Primož Roglič (SLO)	Team Jumbo–Visma	3h 11' 00"
2	Enric Mas (ESP)	Movistar Team	+ 3"
3	Miguel Ángel López (COL)	Movistar Team	+ 5"
4	Jack Haig (AUS)	Team Bahrain Victorious	+ 7"
5	Adam Yates (GBR)	INEOS Grenadiers	+ 7"
6	Romain Bardet (FRA)	Team DSM	+ 7"
7	Felix Großschartner (AUT)	Bora–Hansgrohe	+ 7"
8	Aleksandr Vlasov (RUS)	Astana–Premier Tech	+ 7"
9	Egan Bernal (COL)	INEOS Grenadiers	+ 11"
10	Odd Christian Eiking (NOR)	Intermarché–Wanty–Gobert Matériaux	+ 11"

General classification after Stage 11
Rank	Rider	Team	Time
1	Odd Christian Eiking (NOR)	Intermarché–Wanty–Gobert Matériaux	41h 48' 57"
2	Guillaume Martin (FRA)	Cofidis	+ 58"
3	Primož Roglič (SLO)	Team Jumbo–Visma	+ 1' 56"
4	Enric Mas (ESP)	Movistar Team	+ 2' 31"
5	Miguel Ángel López (COL)	Movistar Team	+ 3' 28"
6	Jack Haig (AUS)	Team Bahrain Victorious	+ 3' 55"
7	Egan Bernal (COL)	INEOS Grenadiers	+ 4' 46"
8	Adam Yates (GBR)	INEOS Grenadiers	+ 4' 57"
9	Sepp Kuss (USA)	Team Jumbo–Visma	+ 5' 03"
10	Felix Großschartner (AUT)	Bora–Hansgrohe	+ 5' 38"
