= Martin Salmon =

German road cyclist

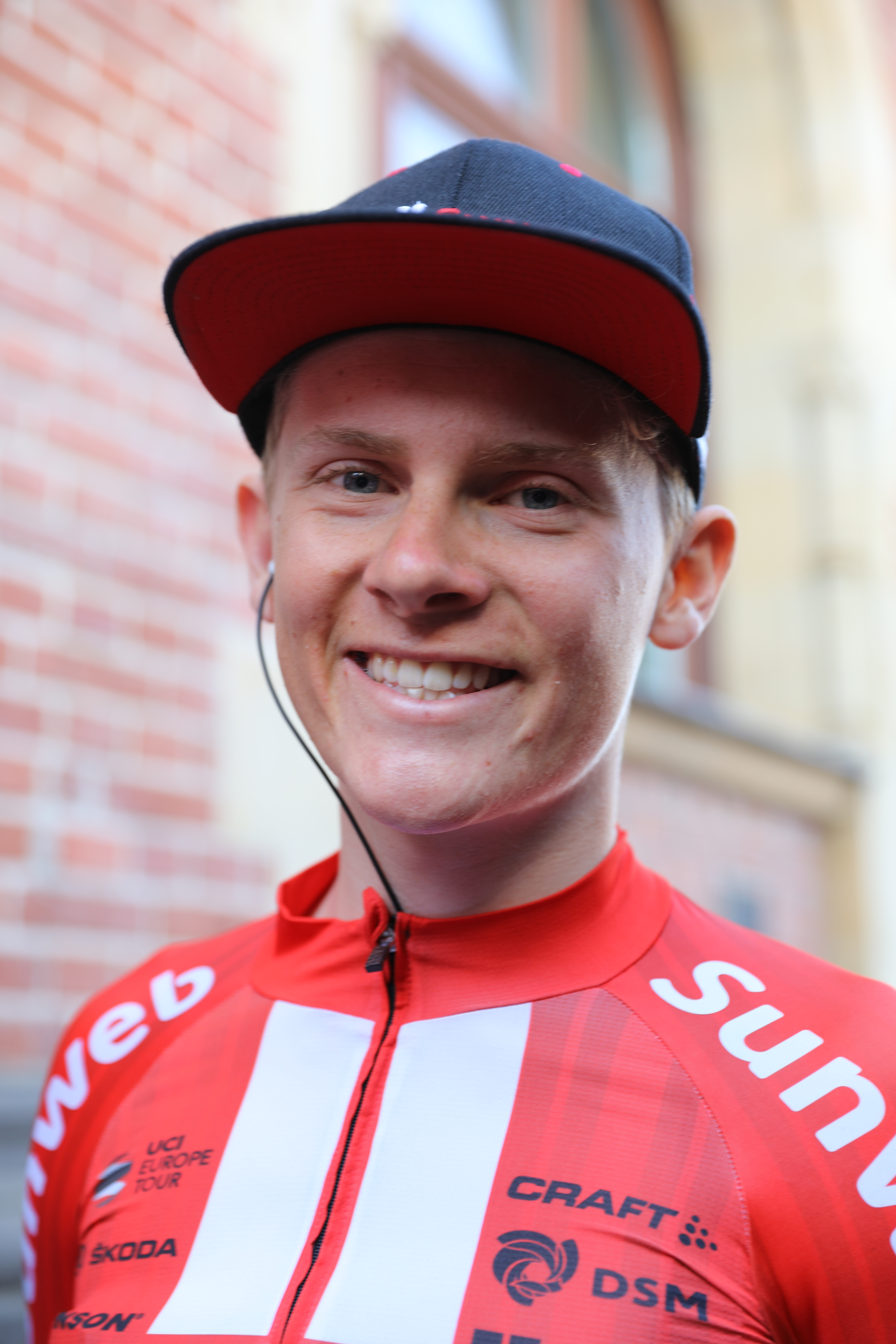
- Salmon at the 2019 Rund um Köln

Personal information
- Full name: Martin Alexander Salmon
- Born: 29 October 1997 (age 28) Germersheim, Germany
- Height: 1.79 m (5 ft 10 in)
- Weight: 59 kg (130 lb)

Cycling career
- Sport: Cycling
- Current team: Retired
- Discipline: Road
- Role: Rider

Amateur teams
- 2016: Chambéry CF
- 2017–2019: Development Team Sunweb

Professional teams
- 2019: Team Sunweb (stagiaire)
- 2020–2021: Team Sunweb

Martin Alexander Salmon (born 29 October 1997 in Germersheim) is a German former cyclist, who last rode for UCI WorldTeam Team Picnic–PostNL. In October 2020, he was named in the startlist for the 2020 Vuelta a España.

== Major results ==
2015
3rd Road race, National Junior Road Championships
5th Road race, UCI Junior Road World Championships
6th Overall GP Général Patton

1st Stage 2

6th Overall Giro della Lunigiana
2019
1st Mountains classification Okolo Slovenska
2020
1st Mountains classification Tour de Limousin

=== Grand Tour general classification results timeline ===
Grand Tour	2020
Giro d'Italia	—
Tour de France	—
Vuelta a España	DNF

Legend
—	Did not compete
DNF	Did not finish
