= Mateusz Grabis =

Polish cyclist (born 1994)

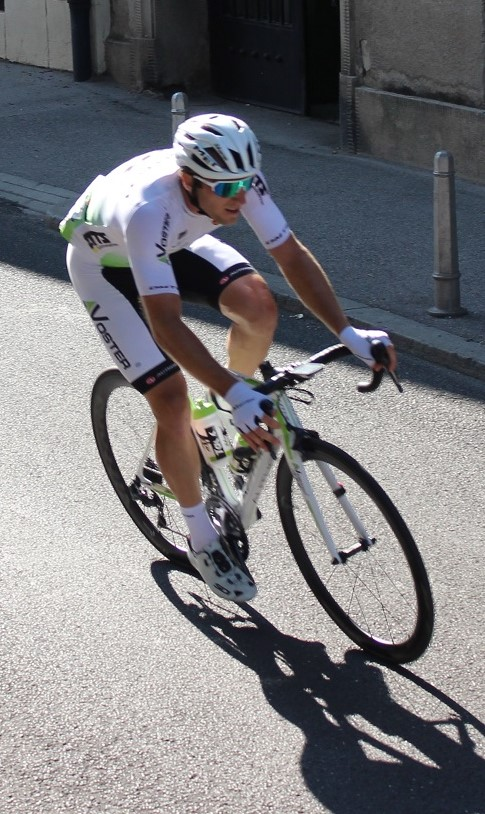
- Grabis at the 2021 CRO Race

Personal information
- Born: 24 August 1994 (age 32) Będzin, Poland
- Height: 1.85 m (6 ft 1 in)
- Weight: 75 kg (165 lb)

Cycling career
- Sport: Cycling
- Current team: Voster Team
- Discipline: Road
- Role: Rider

Amateur teams
- 2014: Weltour Ziemia Brzeska
- 2015–2016: TC Chrobry Saroni Głogów

Professional team
- 2017–: Voster Uniwheels Team

Mateusz Grabis (born 24 August 1994) is a Polish professional racing cyclist, who currently rides for UCI Continental team Voster Team.

== Major results ==
2015
2nd Road race, National Under-23 Road Championships
2016
4th Puchar Uzdrowisk Karpackich
9th Coppa dei Laghi-Trofeo Almar
9th GP Czech Republic, Visegrad 4 Bicycle Race
2017
9th GP Slovakia, Visegrad 4 Bicycle Race
2018
1st Memorial Henryka Łasaka
3rd Overall Tour of Romania
3rd Puchar Uzdrowisk Karpackich
2019
2nd Korona Kocich Gor
8th Overall Tour of Malopolska
2021
2nd Memorial Henryka Łasaka
