= Leon Heinschke =

German cyclist

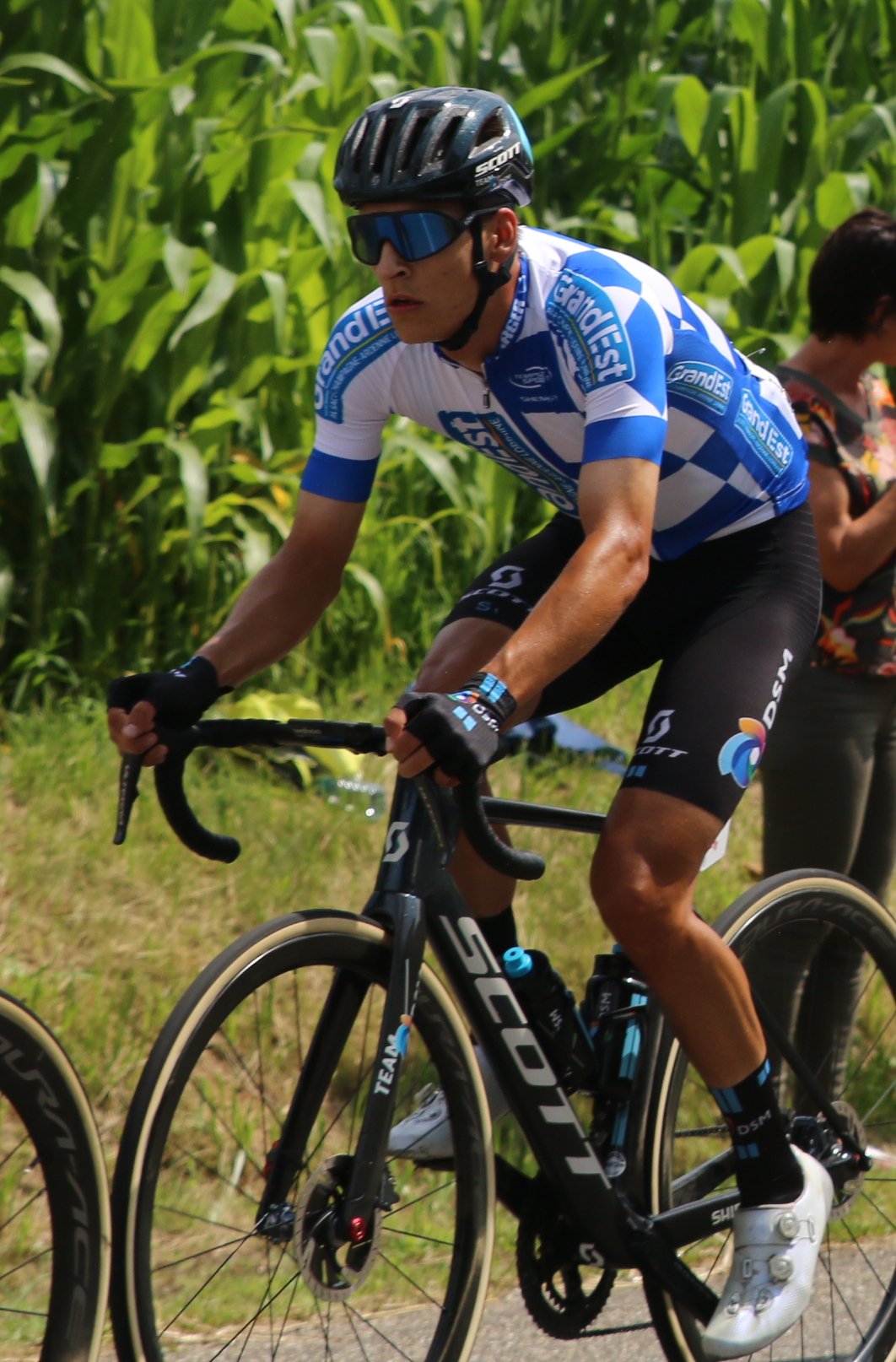
- Heinschke at the 2021 Tour Alsace

Personal information
- Born: 8 November 1999 (age 26) Frankfurt (Oder), Germany
- Height: 1.80 m (5 ft 11 in)
- Weight: 70 kg (154 lb)

Cycling career
- Sport: Cycling
- Discipline: Road
- Role: Rider

Professional teams
- 2018–2021: Development Team DSM
- 2022–2023: Team DSM

Leon Heinschke (born 8 November 1999) is a German cyclist, who most recently rode for UCI WorldTeam Team dsm–firmenich.

== Major results ==
2016
1st Stage 1a (TTT) La Coupe du Président de la Ville de Grudziądz
2017
1st Time trial, National Junior Road Championships
2nd Overall Giro della Lunigiana

1st Points classification

3rd Overall Tour du Pays de Vaud
5th Overall GP Général Patton

1st Mountains classification
1st Stage 2

10th Overall Course de la Paix Juniors
2019
1st Road race, National Under-23 Road Championships
2020
1st Stage 2b (TTT) Ronde de l'Isard
7th Poreč Trophy
2021
2nd Overall Circuit des Ardennes International

1st Points classification
1st Young rider classification

3rd Overall Tour Alsace

1st Young rider classification
