= Niklas Märkl =

German road racing cyclist

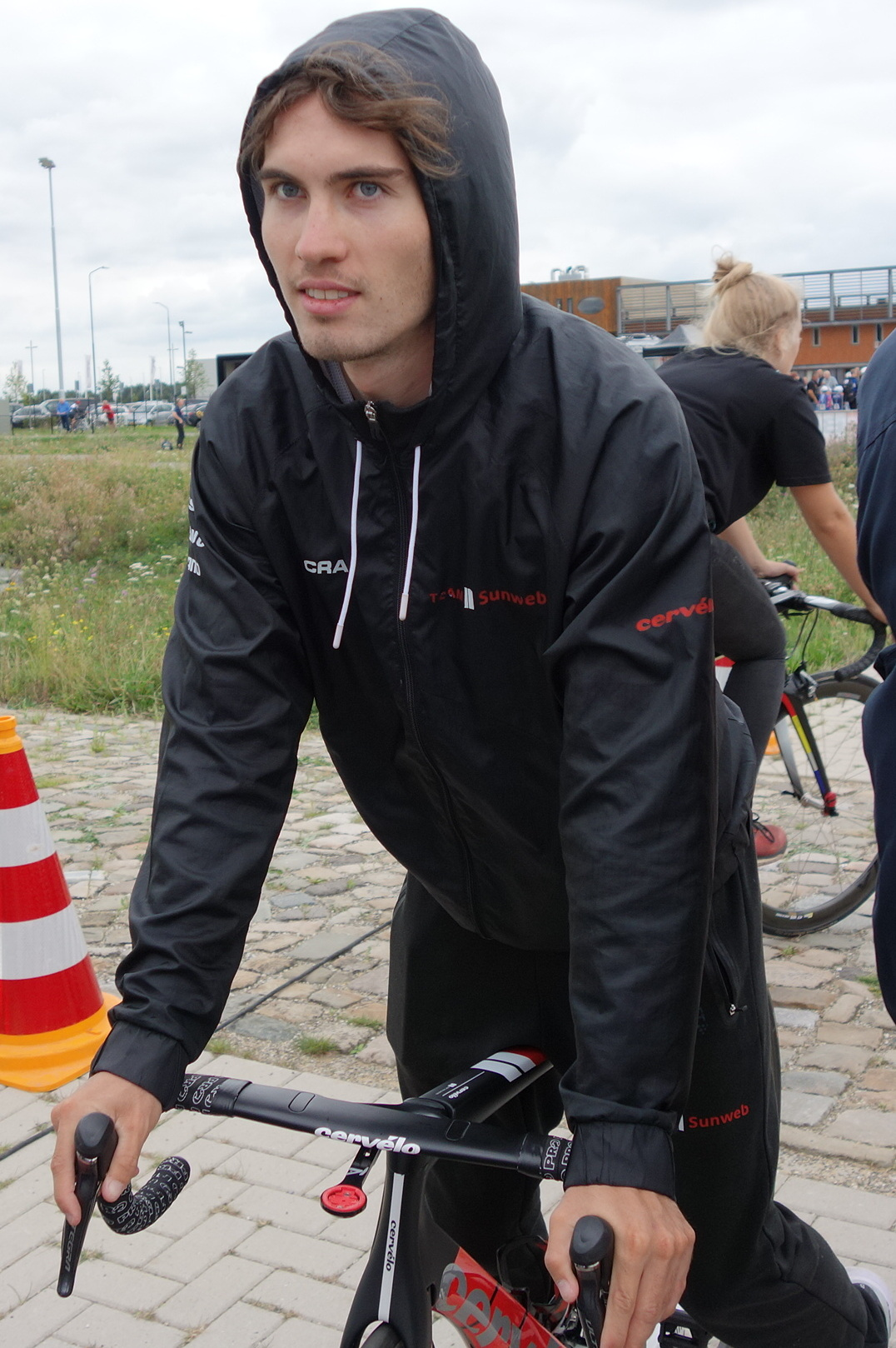
- Märkl in 2019

Personal information
- Born: 3 March 1999 (age 27) Queidersbach, Germany
- Height: 1.85 m (6 ft 1 in)
- Weight: 70 kg (154 lb)

Cycling career
- Sport: Cycling
- Current team: Team Picnic–PostNL
- Discipline: Road
- Role: Rider

Professional teams
- 2018–2020: Development Team Sunweb
- 2021–: Team DSM

Niklas Märkl (born 3 March 1999) is a German cyclist, who currently rides for UCI WorldTeam Team Picnic–PostNL.

== Major results ==
2016
2nd Road race, UCI Junior Road World Championships
2nd Road race, National Junior Road Championships
2017
1st Trofeo Emilio Paganessi
1st Trofeo Comune di Vertova
Course de la Paix Juniors

1st Points classification
1st Stage 4

2nd Overall Trofeo Karlsberg
3rd Road race, UEC European Junior Road Championships
4th Road race, UCI Junior Road World Championships
4th Gent–Wevelgem Juniors
8th Grand Prix Bob Jungels
2019
1st Youngster Coast Challenge
1st Prologue Istrian Spring Trophy
4th Grand Prix Criquielion
6th Umag Trophy
2020
3rd Umag Trophy
10th Poreč Trophy
2021
5th Münsterland Giro
10th Overall Okolo Slovenska
2024
10th Veenendaal–Veenendaal

=== Grand Tour general classification results timeline ===
| Grand Tour | 2023 | 2024 | 2025 |
|---|---|---|---|
| Giro d'Italia | 104 | — | 156 |
| Tour de France | — | — | 112 |
| Vuelta a España | — | — | — |
