= Development Team Picnic–PostNL =

Dutch cycling team

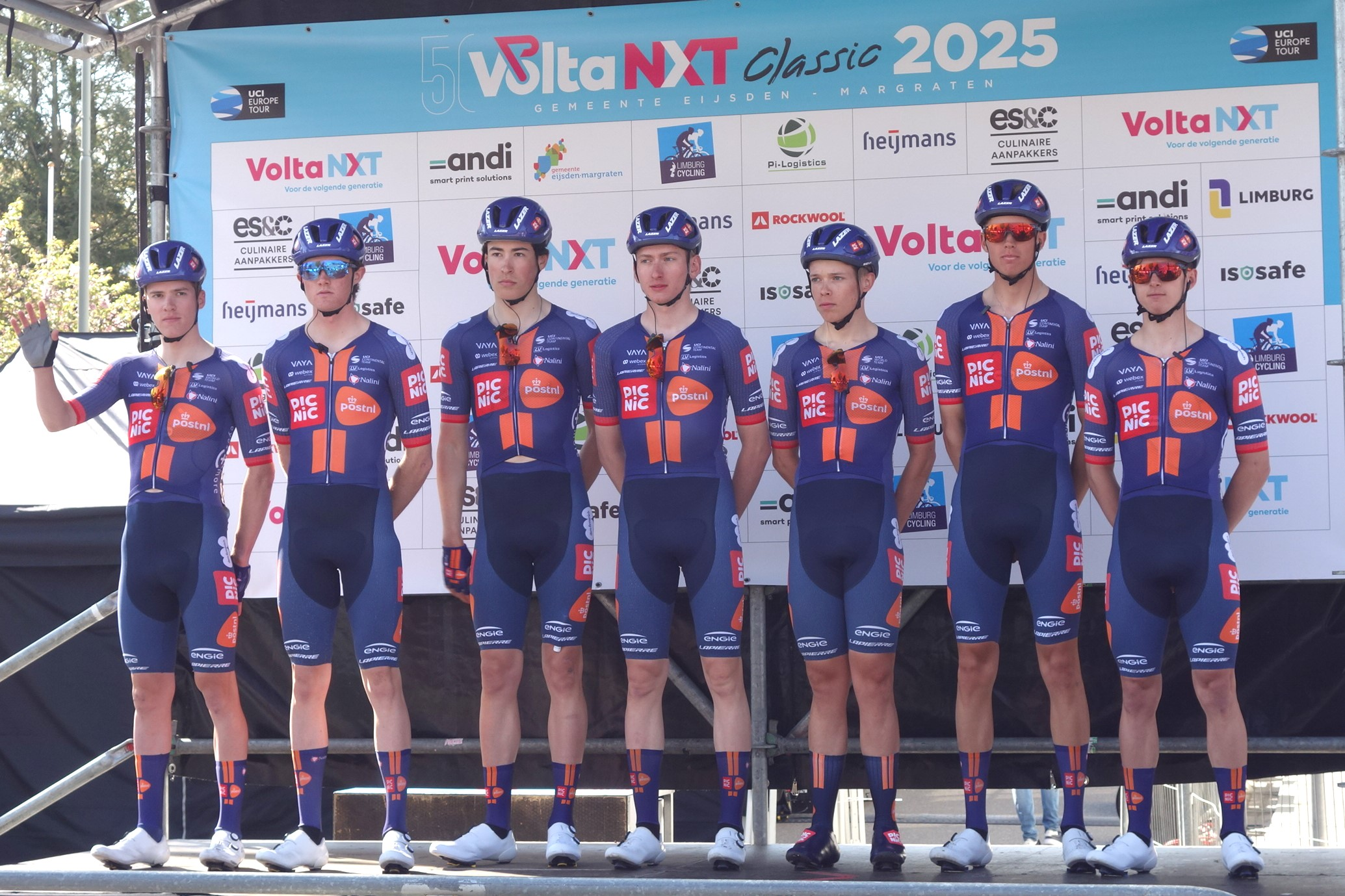

Team information
- UCI code: DPP
- Registered: Germany (2017–2021); Netherlands (2022–)
- Founded: 2017
- Discipline: Road
- Status: UCI Continental

Team name history
- 2017–2020 2021–2023 2023 2024 2025–: Development Team Sunweb (DSU); Development Team DSM (DDS); Development Team DSM–Firmenich (DDS); Development Team DSM–Firmenich PostNL (DDP); Development Team Picnic–PostNL (DPP)

Development Team Picnic–PostNL is a Dutch UCI Continental team founded in 2017. The team acts as the development squad for UCI WorldTeam Team Picnic–PostNL.

== Team roster ==
As of 17 September 2026.

Rider	Date of birth
Jacob Bush (GBR)	2 June 2005 (age 21)
Milan De Ceuster (BEL)	29 December 2005 (age 20)
Lennes Jacobs (BEL)	15 December 2007 (age 18)
Ko Molenaar (NED)	1 September 2006 (age 20)
Finn O'Brien (GBR)	23 November 2007 (age 18)
Matthew Peace (GBR)	11 April 2007 (age 19)
Xander Scheldeman (BEL)	24 May 2006 (age 20)
Pavel Šumpík (CZE)	11 September 2006 (age 20)

Rider	Date of birth
Alexandre Trouvain (FRA)	5 July 2007 (age 19)
Ulrik Tvedt (NOR)	17 May 2003 (age 23)
Thom van der Werff (NED)	14 January 2005 (age 21)
Christiaan van Rees (NED)	28 April 2005 (age 21)
Matteo Vanhuffel (BEL)	27 August 2006 (age 20)
Rick Versloot (NED)	12 January 2007 (age 19)
Mees Vlot (NED)	9 April 2005 (age 21)
Jurgen Zomermaand (NED)	13 February 2006 (age 20)

== Major wins ==
2017
Paris–Roubaix Espoirs, Nils Eekhoff
Germany National Under-23 Road Race, Max Kanter
Stage 6 Olympia's Tour, Jarno Mobach
2018
Prologue Istrian Spring Trophy, Nils Eekhoff
Stage 2 Istrian Spring Trophy, Marc Hirschi
Germany National Under-23 Road Race, Max Kanter
Stage 3 Tour Alsace, Marc Hirschi
Stages 2 & 4 Olympia's Tour, Max Kanter
2019
Overall Istrian Spring Trophy, Felix Gall

Prologue, Niklas Markl
Stage 2, Felix Gall

Youngster Coast Challenge, Niklas Markl
Stage 7 Tour de Bretagne, Nils Eekhoff
Ronde van Overijssel, Nils Eekhoff
Germany National Under-23 Road Race, Leon Heinschke
2020
Stage 2b (TTT) Ronde de l'Isard (Note: The riders in the squad were Leo Hayter, Nils Sinschek, Leon Heinschke, Casper van Uden, Jarno Mobach and Enzo Leijnse.)
2021
Stages 3 & 5 Course Cycliste de Solidarnosc et des Champions Olympiques, Casper van Uden
Stage 2 Giro della Valle d'Aosta, Gianmarco Garofoli
Ronde van de Achterhoek, Casper van Uden
Liège–Bastogne–Liège Espoirs, Leo Hayter
Stage 2 Tour de Bretagne, Leo Hayter
Stage 7 Tour de Bretagne, Tobias Lund Andresen
United Kingdom National Under-23 Time Trial, Leo Hayter
2022
Stages 2 & 4 Tour de Normandie, Casper van Uden
Stages 1 & 3a (ITT) Le Triptyque des Monts et Châteaux, Lorenzo Milesi
Stage 4 Tour de Bretagne, Casper van Uden
Stage 5 Giro della Valle d'Aosta, Oscar Onley
2023
Stage 4 Olympia's Tour, Enzo Leijnse
Netherlands National Under-23 Time Trial, Enzo Leijnse
Stage 5 Tour Alsace, Frank van den Broek
2024
Dorpenomloop Rucphen, Johan Dorussen
2025
Ronde van de Achterhoek, Johan Dorussen
2026
Stage 3 Tour du Rwanda, Jurgen Zomermaand
Stage 2 Circuit des Ardennes, Pavel Šumpík

== National champions ==
2017
German Under-23 Road Race, Max Kanter
2018
German Under-23 Road Race, Max Kanter
2019
German Under-23 Road Race, Leon Heinschke
2021
British Under-23 Time Trial, Leo Hayter
2023
Dutch Under-23 Time Trial, Enzo Leijnse

== See also ==
- Team Picnic–PostNL (men's team)
- Team Picnic–PostNL (women's team)
