= 2021 Team Bahrain Victorious season =

Team Bahrain Victorious
- 2021 season
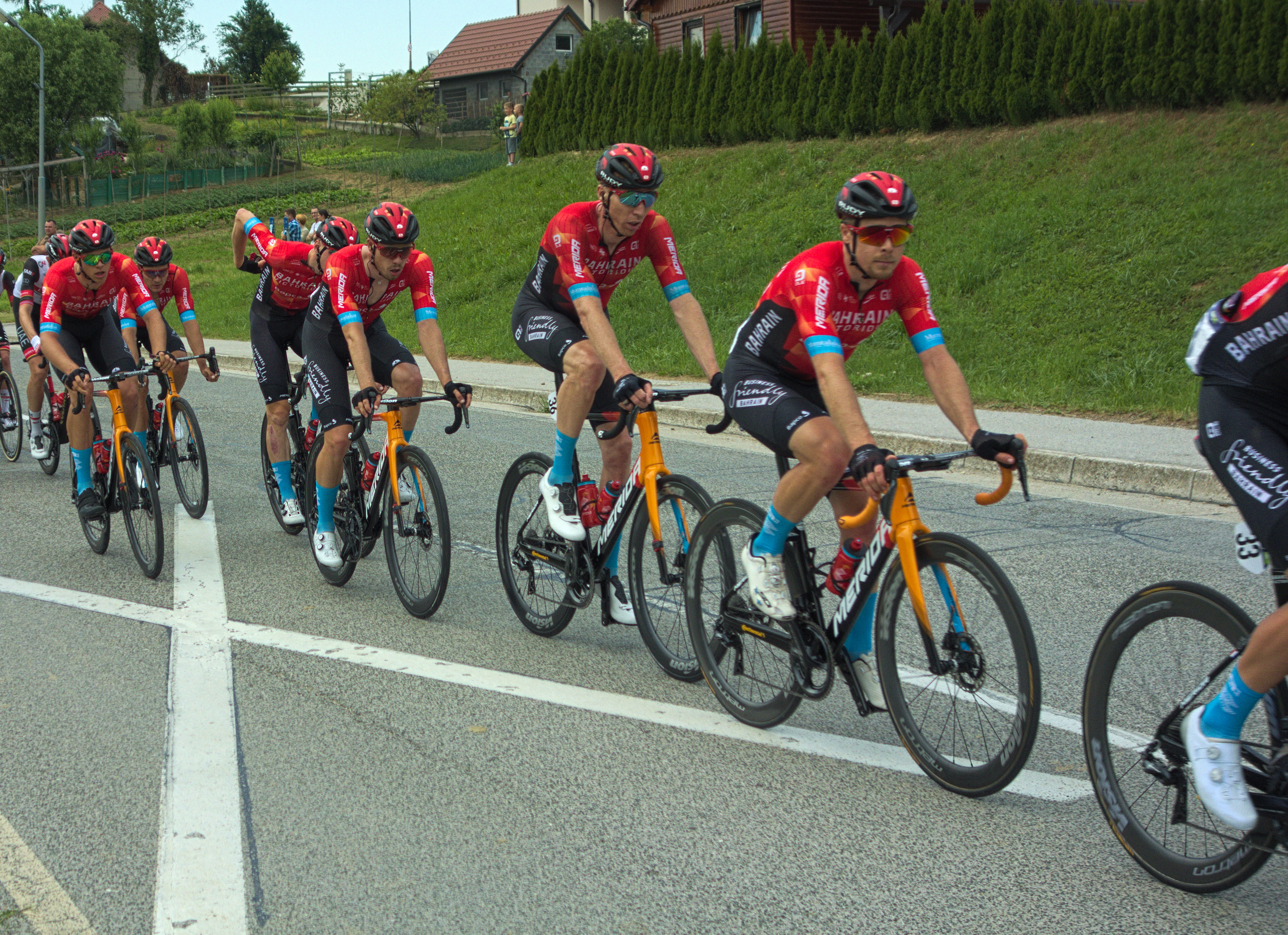
- Team Bahrain Victorious leading the peloton on Stage 1 of the Tour of Slovenia
- UCI code: TBV
- Status: UCI WorldTeam
- World Tour Rank: 5th
- Owner: Nasser bin Hamad Al Khalifa
- Manager: Milan Eržen (SLO)
- Based: Bahrain
- Bicycles: Merida
- Groupset: Shimano

Season victories
- One-day races: 2
- Stage race overall: 3
- Stage race stages: 22
- National Championships: 4
- Most wins: Sonny Colbrelli (ITA) (10)
- Best ranked rider: Sonny Colbrelli (ITA) (6th)
- Jersey

The 2021 season for Team Bahrain Victorious was the fifth season in the team's existence, all of which have been as a UCI WorldTeam. After just one year, British car manufacturer McLaren withdrew from its co-title sponsorship, citing a desire to "focus on motorsport after the uncertainty caused ... by the coronavirus pandemic." The team then took on the name of Victorious Stables, a horse racing stable owned by team owner Nasser bin Hamad Al Khalifa, with the adjective serving as "a constant reminder of [the team's] goal to achieve success at the highest level both on and off the bike."

== Team roster ==
As of 10 June 2021.

Rider	Date of birth
Yukiya Arashiro (JPN)	22 September 1984 (aged 36)
Phil Bauhaus (GER)	8 July 1994 (aged 26)
Pello Bilbao (ESP)	25 February 1990 (aged 30)
Santiago Buitrago (COL)	26 September 1999 (aged 21)
Eros Capecchi (ITA)	13 June 1986 (aged 34)
Damiano Caruso (ITA)	12 October 1987 (aged 33)
Sonny Colbrelli (ITA)	17 May 1990 (aged 30)
Scott Davies (GBR)	5 August 1995 (aged 25)
Feng Chun-kai (TWN)	2 November 1988 (aged 32)
Jack Haig (AUS)	6 September 1993 (aged 27)
Marco Haller (AUT)	1 April 1991 (aged 29)
Heinrich Haussler (AUS)	25 February 1984 (aged 36)
Kevin Inkelaar (NED)	8 July 1997 (aged 23)
Mikel Landa (ESP)	13 December 1989 (aged 31)

Rider	Date of birth
Ahmed Madan (BHR)	25 August 2000 (aged 20)
Gino Mäder (SUI)	4 January 1997 (aged 23)
Jonathan Milan (ITA)	1 October 2000 (aged 20)
Matej Mohorič (SLO)	19 October 1994 (aged 26)
Domen Novak (SLO)	12 July 1995 (aged 25)
Mark Padun (UKR)	6 July 1996 (aged 24)
Hermann Pernsteiner (AUT)	7 August 1990 (aged 30)
Wout Poels (NED)	1 October 1987 (aged 33)
Marcel Sieberg (GER)	30 April 1982 (aged 38)
Dylan Teuns (BEL)	1 March 1992 (aged 28)
Jan Tratnik (SLO)	23 February 1990 (aged 30)
Rafael Valls (ESP)	25 June 1987 (aged 33)
Stephen Williams (GBR)	9 June 1996 (aged 24)
Alfred Wright (GBR)	13 June 1999 (aged 21)

Riders who joined the team for the 2021 season

Rider	2020 team
Jack Haig	Mitchelton–Scott
Ahmed Madan	neo-pro (Bahrain Cycling Academy)
Gino Mäder	NTT Pro Cycling
Jonathan Milan	neo-pro (Cycling Team Friuli ASD)

Riders who left the team during or after the 2020 season

Rider	2021 team
Enrico Battaglin	Bardiani–CSF–Faizanè
Grega Bole	Al-Ahli Shabab
Mark Cavendish	Deceuninck–Quick-Step
Iván García Cortina	Movistar Team
Luka Pibernik	Retired

== Season victories ==
Date	Race	Competition	Rider	Country	Location	Ref.
14 February	Tour de la Provence, Stage 4	UCI Europe Tour; UCI ProSeries	Phil Bauhaus (GER)	France	Salon-de-Provence	
22 April	Tour of the Alps, Stage 4	UCI Europe Tour; UCI ProSeries	Pello Bilbao (ESP)	Italy	Valle del Chiese (Pieve di Bono)	
29 April	Tour de Romandie, Stage 2	UCI World Tour	Sonny Colbrelli (ITA)	Switzerland	Saint-Imier	
2 May	Tour de Romandie, Points classification	UCI World Tour	Sonny Colbrelli (ITA)	Switzerland		
12 May	Tour de Hongrie, Stage 1	UCI Europe Tour	Phil Bauhaus (GER)	Hungary	Kaposvár	
13 May	Giro d'Italia, Stage 6	UCI World Tour	Gino Mäder (SUI)	Italy	Ascoli Piceno (San Giacomo)	
14 May	Tour de Hongrie, Stage 3	UCI Europe Tour	Phil Bauhaus (GER)	Hungary	Tata	
16 May	Tour de Hongrie, Points classification	UCI Europe Tour	Phil Bauhaus (GER)	Hungary		
29 May	Giro d'Italia, Stage 20	UCI World Tour	Damiano Caruso (ITA)	Italy	Valle Spluga (Alpe Motta)	
1 June	Critérium du Dauphiné, Stage 3	UCI World Tour	Sonny Colbrelli (ITA)	France	Saint-Haon-le-Vieux	
5 June	Critérium du Dauphiné, Stage 7	UCI World Tour	Mark Padun (UKR)	France	La Plagne	
6 June	Critérium du Dauphiné, Stage 8	UCI World Tour	Mark Padun (UKR)	France	Les Gets	
6 June	Critérium du Dauphiné, Points classification	UCI World Tour	Sonny Colbrelli (ITA)	France		
6 June	Critérium du Dauphiné, Mountains classification	UCI World Tour	Mark Padun (UKR)	France		
9 June	Tour of Slovenia, Stage 1	UCI Europe Tour; UCI ProSeries	Phil Bauhaus (GER)	Slovenia	Rogaška Slatina	
13 June	Tour of Slovenia, Stage 5	UCI Europe Tour; UCI ProSeries	Phil Bauhaus (GER)	Slovenia	Novo Mesto	
13 June	Tour of Slovenia, Points classification	UCI Europe Tour; UCI ProSeries	Matej Mohorič (SLO)	Slovenia		
13 June	Tour de Suisse, Stage 8	UCI World Tour	Gino Mäder (SUI)	Switzerland	Andermatt	
2 July	Tour de France, Stage 7	UCI World Tour	Matej Mohorič (SLO)	France	Le Creusot	
3 July	Tour de France, Stage 8	UCI World Tour	Dylan Teuns (BEL)	France	Le Grand-Bornand	
16 July	Tour de France, Stage 19	UCI World Tour	Matej Mohorič (SLO)	France	Libourne	
18 July	Settimana Ciclistica Italiana, Mountains classification	UCI Europe Tour	Santiago Buitrago (COL)	Italy		
18 July	Tour de France, Team classification	UCI World Tour	(Note: The riders in the squad were Pello Bilbao, Sonny Colbrelli, Jack Haig, Marco Haller, Matej Mohorič, Wout Poels, Dylan Teuns, and Fred Wright.)	France		
7 August	Vuelta a Burgos, Overall	UCI Europe Tour; UCI ProSeries	Mikel Landa (ESP)	Spain		
7 August	Vuelta a Burgos, Team classification	UCI Europe Tour; UCI ProSeries	(Note: The riders in the squad were Yukiya Arashiro, Santiago Buitrago, Damiano Caruso, Mikel Landa, Gino Mäder, Mark Padun, and Stephen Williams.)	Spain		
9 August	Tour de Pologne, Stage 1	UCI World Tour	Phil Bauhaus (GER)	Poland	Chełm	
22 August	Vuelta a España, Stage 9	UCI World Tour	Damiano Caruso (ITA)	Spain	Alto de Velefique	
29 August	Deutschland Tour, Team classification	UCI Europe Tour; UCI ProSeries	(Note: The riders in the squad were Phil Bauhaus, Marco Haller, Domen Novak, Hermann Pernsteiner, Marcel Sieberg, and Dylan Teuns.)	Germany		
4 September	Benelux Tour, Stage 6	UCI World Tour	Sonny Colbrelli (ITA)	Belgium	Houffalize	
5 September	Benelux Tour, Stage 7	UCI World Tour	Matej Mohorič (SLO)	Belgium	Geraardsbergen	
5 September	Benelux Tour, Overall	UCI World Tour	Sonny Colbrelli (ITA)	Belgium		
5 September	Benelux Tour, Team classification	UCI World Tour	(Note: The riders in the squad were Phil Bauhaus, Sonny Colbrelli, Heinrich Haussler, Jonathan Milan, Matej Mohorič, Marcel Sieberg, and Fred Wright.)	Belgium		
5 September	Vuelta a España, Young rider classification	UCI World Tour	Gino Mäder (SUI)	Spain		
5 September	Vuelta a España, Team classification	UCI World Tour	(Note: The riders in the squad were Yukiya Arashiro, Damiano Caruso, Jack Haig, Mikel Landa, Gino Mäder, Mark Padun, Wout Poels, and Jan Tratnik.)	Spain		
18 September	Memorial Marco Pantani	UCI Europe Tour	Sonny Colbrelli (ITA)	Italy	Cesenatico	
28 September	CRO Race, Stage 1	UCI Europe Tour	Phil Bauhaus (GER)	Croatia	Varaždin	
2 October	CRO Race, Stage 5	UCI Europe Tour	Stephen Williams (GBR)	Croatia	Opatija	
3 October	CRO Race, Overall	UCI Europe Tour	Stephen Williams (GBR)	Croatia		
3 October	CRO Race, Team classification	UCI Europe Tour	(Note: The riders in the squad were Phil Bauhaus, Santiago Buitrago, Mikel Landa, Domen Novak, Mark Padun, Hermann Pernsteiner, and Stephen Williams.)	Croatia		
3 October	Paris–Roubaix	UCI World Tour	Sonny Colbrelli (ITA)	France	Roubaix	

== National, Continental, and World Champions ==
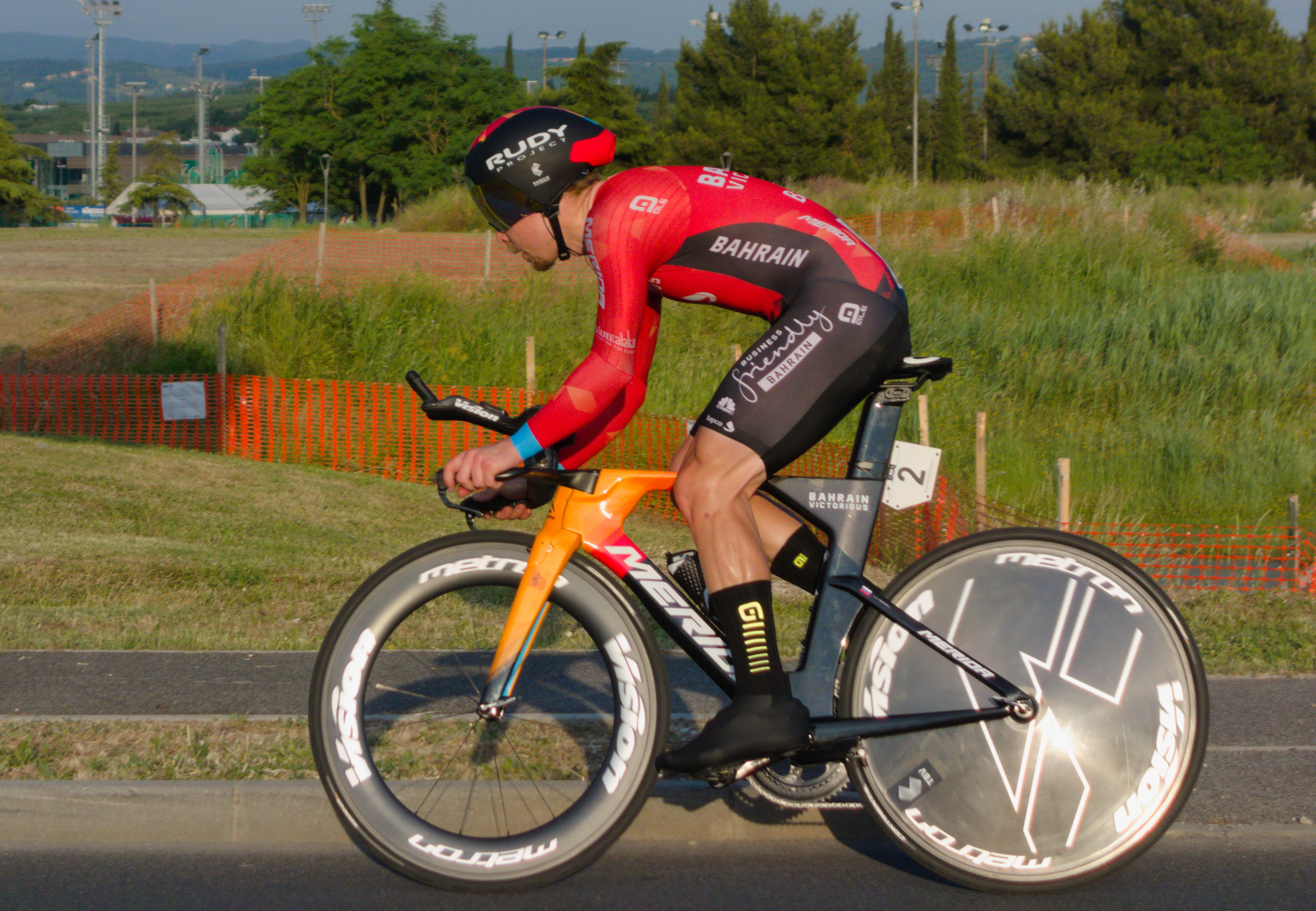
Jan Tratnik on the way to winning the Slovenian National Time Trial Championships, in which he beat defending champion Tadej Pogačar and 2017 winner Jan Polanc (both UAE Team Emirates)

Date	Discipline	Jersey	Rider	Country	Location	Ref.
17 June	Slovenian National Time Trial Championships		Jan Tratnik (SLO)	Slovenia	Koper	
20 June	Slovenian National Road Race Championships		Matej Mohorič (SLO)	Slovenia	Koper	
20 June	Italian National Road Race Championships		Sonny Colbrelli (ITA)	Italy	Imola	
12 September	European Road Race Championships		Sonny Colbrelli (ITA)	Italy	Trento	
1 November	Taiwanese National Road Race Championships		Feng Chun-kai (TWN)	Taiwan	Taitung County	
