= Gino Mäder =

Swiss cyclist (1997–2023)

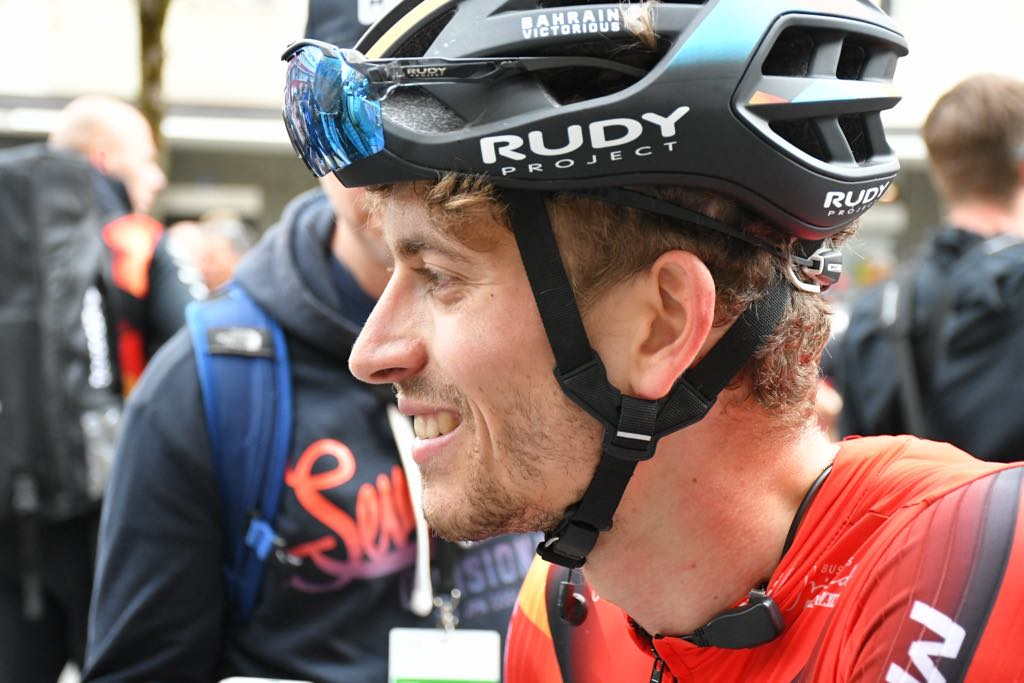
- Mäder in 2023

Personal information
- Born: 4 January 1997 Flawil, Switzerland
- Died: 16 June 2023 (aged 26) Chur, Switzerland
- Height: 181 cm (5 ft 11 in)
- Weight: 61 kg (134 lb)

Cycling career
- Sport: Cycling
- Disciplines: Track; Road
- Role: Rider

Amateur teams
- 2016: VC Wiedlisbach
- 2017: VC Mendrisio–PL Valli
- 2018: IAM–Excelsior

Professional teams
- 2019–2020: Team Dimension Data
- 2021–2023: Team Bahrain Victorious

Major wins
- Grand Tours Giro d'Italia 1 individual stage (2021) Vuelta a España Young rider classification (2021)

Gino Mäder (Swiss Standard German pronunciation: [ˈdʒiːno ˈmɛːdər]; 4 January 1997 – 16 June 2023) was a Swiss road and track cyclist. He last rode for UCI WorldTeam Team Bahrain Victorious. Mäder died as a result of an accident during the 2023 Tour de Suisse.

== Early life and education ==
Gino Mäder was born on 4 January 1997, in Flawil in the Canton of St. Gallen, and raised in Wiedlisbach. He was baptized Gino in honour of Italian cyclist Gino Bartali; both his parents were cyclists as well. He began playing football at the age of five. Later he started as an apprentice at Swiss Olympic. Before turning professional on the road, Mäder was a high level track cyclist, having competed at the 2016 UEC European Track Championships in the team pursuit event. In 2018 he won two stages at the Tour de l'Avenir and one in the Tour Alsace and another in the Ronde de l'Isard in France. He came in fourth in the U-23 race of the 2018 UCI World Championships in Innsbruck, Austria, with his Swiss teammate Marc Hirschi winning the race. According to him, Hirschi's success was the result of a team effort. Several members of the U-23 team did their mandatory military service together. Mäder cycled with some of them since their U-15 days, and with Patrick Müller (who placed 9th) since about the age of 10.

== Professional career ==
Mäder turned fully professional in 2019, with UCI WorldTeam Team Dimension Data. In October 2020, he was named a starter for the 2020 Vuelta a España. He achieved a second place in the penultimate stage of the Vuelta behind David Gaudu and in the final standing he placed 20th. In early 2021, he joined Bahrain Victorious.

On stage 7 of the 2021 Paris–Nice, Mäder was part of the breakaway, and nearly won the stage. However, in the final 50 metres, he was caught and outsprinted by Primož Roglič. Mäder was given the combativity award for the day. For the Giro d'Italia in 2021, he was made an assistant to Mikel Landa who eventually quit early due to injury during stage 5. The next day, Mäder won the stage and dedicated his victory to the injured Mikel Landa. Mäder eventually had to abandon the Giro due to an injury on his left arm.

Later in the year, Mäder rode the 2021 Vuelta a España. After losing three minutes over the first eight stages, he began to perform strongly starting on stage nine, when he finished seventh on the mountain stage to Alto de Velefique. Over the rest of the race, he continued his strong performance while serving as a domestique for Jack Haig. On stage 17, which finished atop the Lagos de Covadonga, Mäder finished with the elite group that finished a minute and a half down on the race leader, Primož Roglič. The result lifted him inside the top ten on GC. The next day, on the race's queen stage to Altu d'El Gamoniteiru, Haig and Mäder finished fifth and seventh, respectively, at almost a minute down, with Mäder moving up to eighth on GC. On the race's penultimate stage, Mäder and Haig, together with Roglič, Enric Mas, and Adam Yates, comprised a five-man group that escaped from the GC group on the third to last climb. The group continued to build their advantage over the other contenders, with the move allowing Mäder to rise inside the top five overall and Haig to move into the third spot on GC. Mäder also took the lead in the young rider classification as he overtook Egan Bernal. He held his position in the final day time trial to finish the Vuelta in fifth and confirming his victory in the young rider classification.

=== Charity ===
During the 2021 Vuelta a España, Mäder raised 10 Euros for every rider he beat in the general classification, with additional Euros for every cyclist he beat at the end of each stage. He eventually raised over 4000€ for the Amsterdam-based NGO Just Diggit which focuses on re-greening deserted areas in Africa. In 2022, he pledged he would continue to raise money for environmental means donating 1 Euro for every rider he beat at each stage throughout the year.

In 2024, the Vélo d'Or awards committee created a new award, the Gino Mäder Prize, to honor rider's social commitment, saying that Mäder's career "was notable both for its sporting achievements, but also his dedication to social and environment causes."

== Accident and death ==
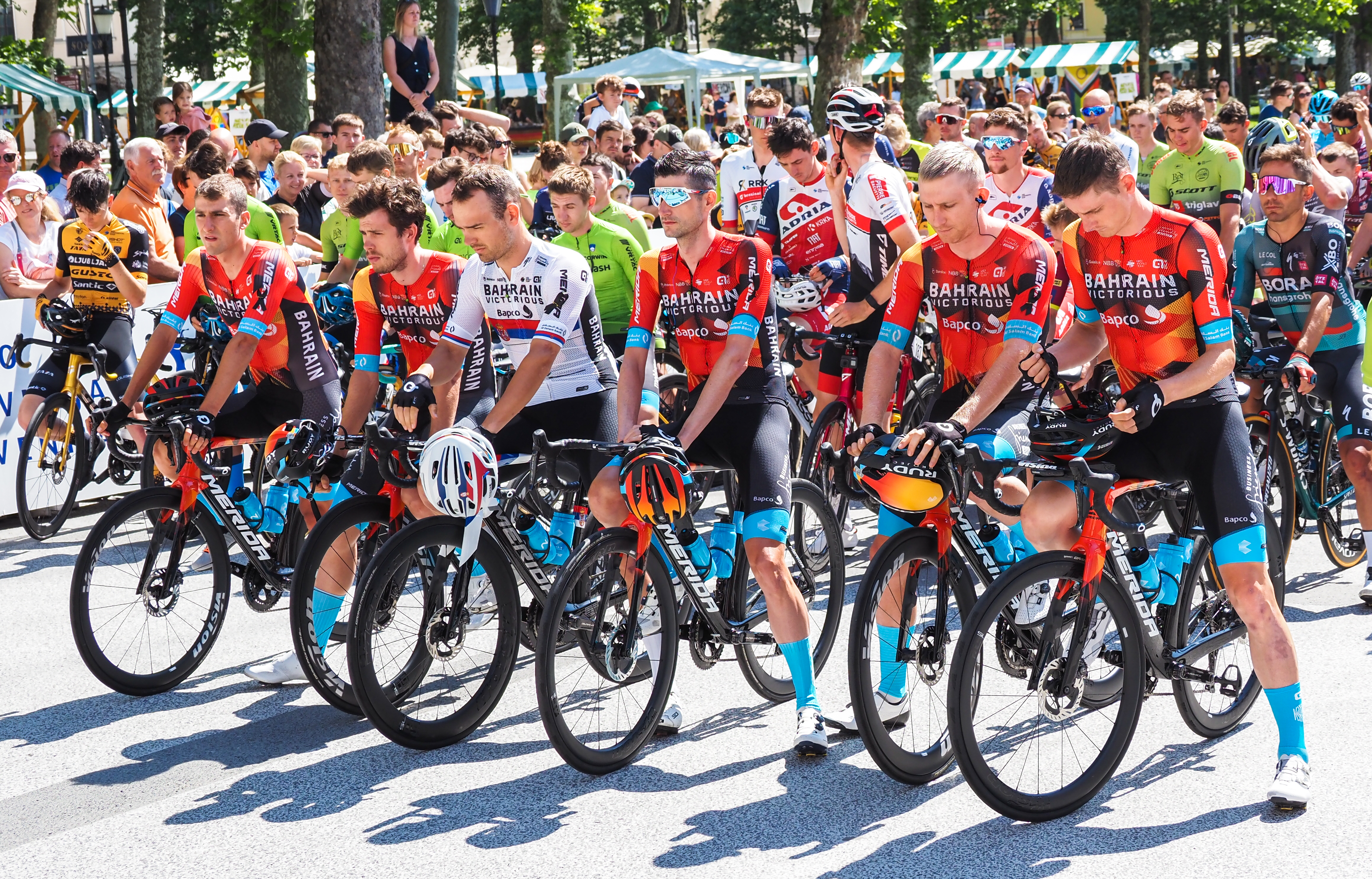
Stage 4 of the 2023 Tour of Slovenia started with a minute of silence for Gino Mäder the day after his death; Team Bahrain Victorious pay their respects from the front of the starting line.

During stage 5 of the Tour de Suisse on 15 June 2023, Mäder fell on a turn when descending from the stage's highest point at Albula Pass towards La Punt. The American cyclist Magnus Sheffield had fallen at almost the exact same spot a few minutes earlier. Mäder was found to be unconscious and submerged in water. After being resuscitated he was airlifted by a Rega helicopter to the Kantonsspital Graubünden in Chur. He died from his injuries the following day, aged 26. Stage 6 of the Tour de Suisse was cancelled, but a 20 km tribute ride to the planned stage finish took place between Türlersee and Oberwil-Lieli.

Bahrain Victorious, along with the Intermarché–Circus–Wanty and Tudor Pro Cycling teams, withdrew from the Tour on the next stage of competitive racing (stage 7 to Weinfelden), as did about 30 other riders. Remco Evenepoel, the winner of stage 7, dedicated his victory to Mäder.

In 2025, a memorial to Mäder on the Albula Pass was unveiled by Tour de Suisse organisers, in a ceremony attended by teams and riders.

== Major results ==
Mäder achieved the following major results:

=== Road ===
2014
4th Road race, UEC European Junior Championships
9th Overall Grand Prix Rüebliland
9th Overall Tour du Pays de Vaud
2015
1st Time trial, National Junior Championships
2nd Overall Tour du Pays de Vaud

1st Prologue & Stage 1

2nd Overall Grand Prix Rüebliland
5th Time trial, UCI World Junior Championships
2017
3rd Piccolo Giro di Lombardia
6th Eschborn–Frankfurt U23
2018 (1 pro win)
Tour Alsace

1st Points classification
1st Stage 4

1st Stage 4 Ronde de l'Isard
2nd Time trial, National Under-23 Championships
2nd Overall Tour of Hainan

1st Stage 6

3rd Overall Tour de l'Avenir

1st Stages 8 & 10

4th Road race, UCI World Under-23 Championships
4th G.P. Palio del Recioto
2021 (2)
Giro d'Italia

1st Stage 6
Held after Stages 6–8

1st Stage 8 Tour de Suisse
5th Time trial, National Championships
5th Overall Vuelta a España

1st Young rider classification

10th Overall Paris–Nice
2022
2nd Overall Tour de Romandie
2023
5th Overall Paris–Nice

==== General classification results timeline ====
Grand Tour general classification results
Grand Tour	2019	2020	2021	2022	2023
Giro d'Italia	—	—	DNF	—	—
Tour de France	—	—	—	—	—
Vuelta a España	—	20	5	20	—
Major stage race general classification results
Race	2019	2020	2021	2022	2023
Paris–Nice	—	—	10	DNF	5
Tirreno–Adriatico	—	—	—	—	—
Volta a Catalunya	DNF	NH	—	—	46
Tour of the Basque Country	—	NH	21	40	—
Tour de Romandie	DNF	NH	—	2	15
Critérium du Dauphiné	—	—	—	—	—
Tour de Suisse	31	NH	27	DNF	DNF

Legend
—	Did not compete
DNF	Did not finish

=== Track ===
2012
3rd Team sprint, National Championships
2014
2nd Omnium, UEC European Junior Championships
2015
National Championships

1st Omnium
2nd Madison (with Silvan Dillier)

2nd Team pursuit, UCI World Junior Championships
2017
3rd Team pursuit, UCI World Cup, Milton
3rd Team pursuit, National Championships
