= Andreas Kron =

Danish bicycle racer

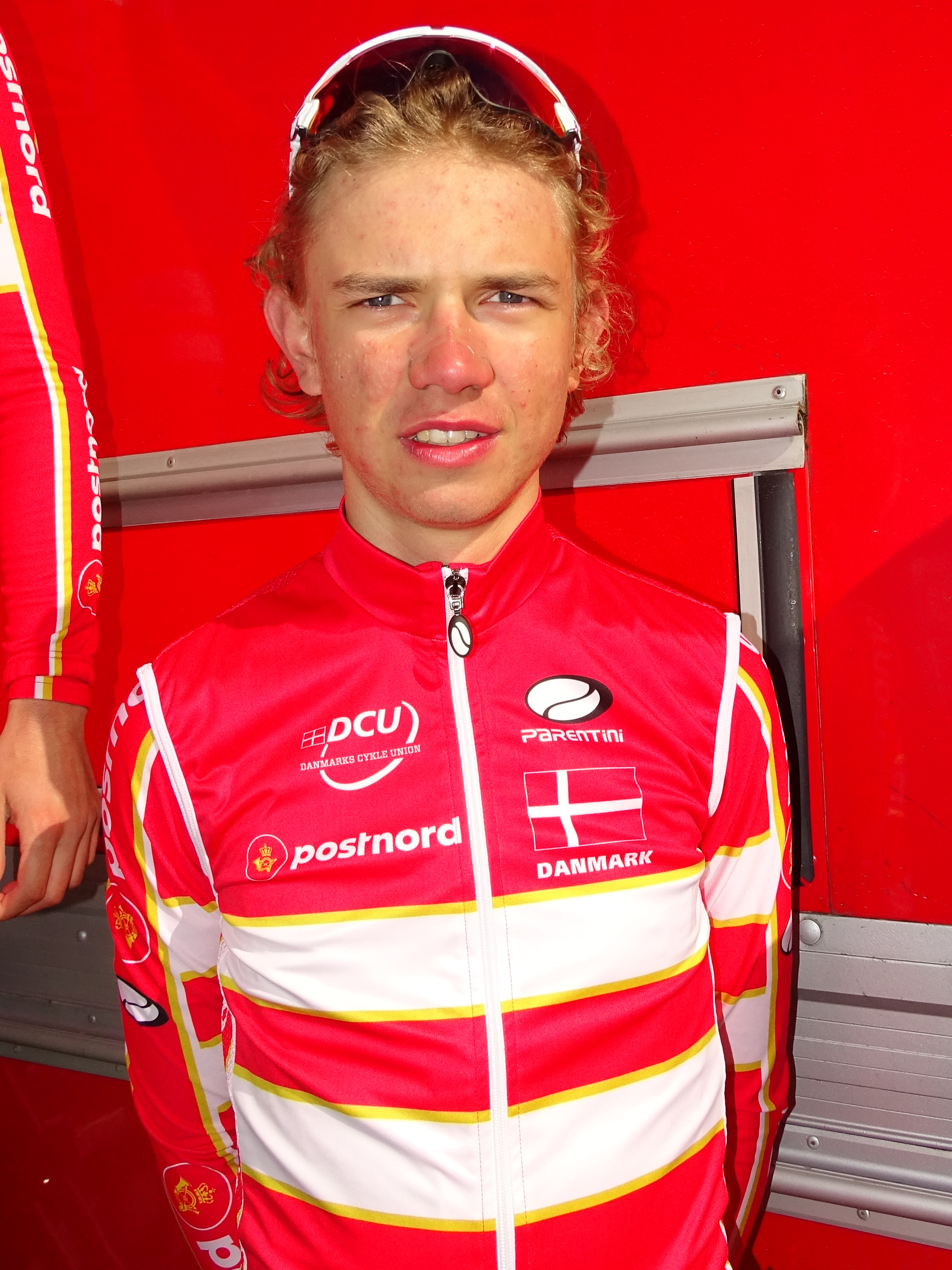
- Kron in 2016.

Personal information
- Full name: Andreas Lorentz Kron
- Born: 1 June 1998 (age 28) Albertslund, Denmark
- Height: 1.77 m (5 ft 10 in)
- Weight: 62 kg (137 lb)

Cycling career
- Sport: Cycling
- Current team: Uno-X Mobility
- Discipline: Road
- Role: Rider
- Rider type: Puncheur

Professional teams
- 2017–2020: Riwal Platform
- 2021–2024: Lotto–Soudal
- 2025–: Uno-X Mobility

Major wins
- Grand Tours Vuelta a España 1 individual stage (2023)

Andreas Lorentz Kron (born 1 June 1998) is a Danish professional racing cyclist, who currently rides for UCI ProTeam Uno-X Mobility.

== Major results ==
2015
7th Overall Keizer der Juniores
2016
1st Overall GP Général Patton

1st Stage 1

1st Overall Keizer der Juniores
9th Overall Grand Prix Rüebliland
2017
4th Eschborn–Frankfurt Under-23
6th Gent–Wevelgem U23
2018
4th Gent–Wevelgem U23
4th Overall Flèche du Sud

1st Stage 3

2019
5th Overall Tour of Belgium
5th Road race, UCI Road World Under-23 Championships
8th Overall Tour Alsace
2020 (1 pro win)
2nd Road race, National Road Championships
5th Overall Tour de Luxembourg

1st Young rider classification
1st Stage 5

8th Overall Tour of Saudi Arabia

1st Young rider classification

9th Trofeo Laigueglia
2021 (2)
1st Stage 1 Volta a Catalunya
1st Stage 6 Tour de Suisse
5th Tre Valli Varesine
Combativity award Stage 19 Vuelta a España
2022
7th Giro della Toscana
8th Overall Tour des Alpes-Maritimes et du Var

1st Young rider classification

8th Coppa Sabatini
9th Clásica Jaén Paraíso Interior
9th Veneto Classic
10th Giro del Veneto
2023 (1)
Vuelta a España

1st Stage 2
Held after Stage 2

3rd Road race, National Road Championships
4th Amstel Gold Race
4th GP Miguel Induráin
5th Veneto Classic
5th Clásica Jaén Paraíso Interior
9th Overall Vuelta a Andalucía
9th Road race, UEC European Road Championships
9th Giro del Veneto
10th Giro di Lombardia
10th Strade Bianche
2026
5th Overall Tour Down Under
9th Strade Bianche
10th La Flèche Wallonne
Combativity award Stage 13 Vuelta a España

=== Grand Tour general classification results timeline ===
Grand Tour	2021	2022	2023	2024	2025
Giro d'Italia	—	—	—	—	—
Tour de France	—	72	—	—	—
Vuelta a España	68	—	67	DNF	—

Legend
—	Did not compete
DNF	Did not finish
