= Aritz Bagües =

Spanish cyclist (born 1989)

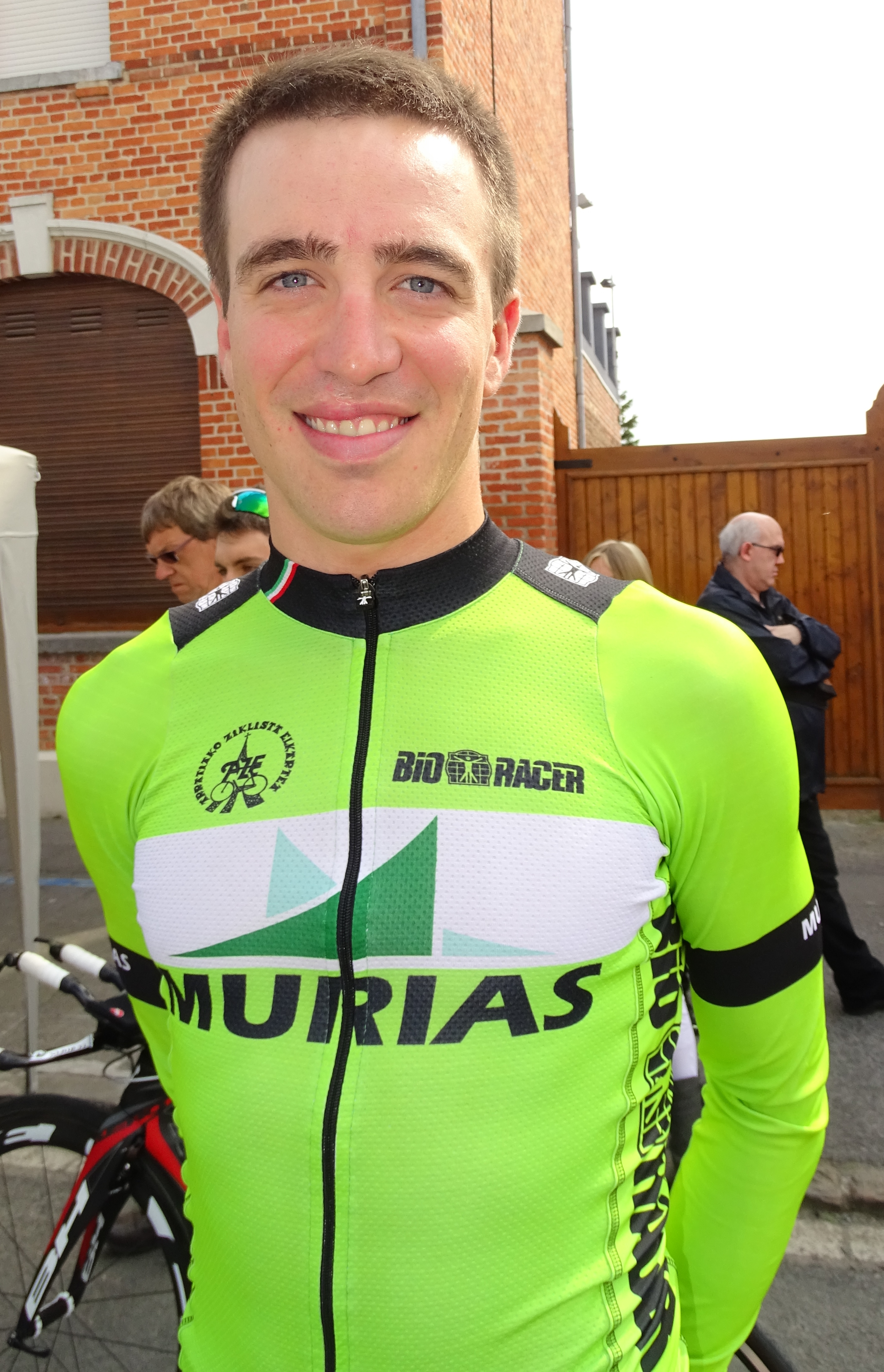
- Bagües in 2014.

Personal information
- Full name: Aritz Bagües Kalparsoro
- Born: 19 August 1989 (age 37) Errenteria, Spain
- Height: 1.77 m (5 ft 10 in)
- Weight: 67 kg (148 lb)

Cycling career
- Sport: Cycling
- Current team: Caja Rural–Seguros RGA
- Discipline: Road
- Role: Rider; Directeur sportif

Amateur teams
- 2008: Bruesa–Policlin
- 2009: Laguntasuna
- 2010: Bidelan–Kirolgi
- 2014: Gipuzkoa–Oreki

Professional teams
- 2011–2013: Orbea
- 2015–2019: Murias Taldea
- 2020–2022: Caja Rural–Seguros RGA

Managerial team
- 2023–: Caja Rural–Seguros RGA

Aritz Bagües Kalparsoro (born 19 August 1989 in Errenteria) is a Spanish former cyclist, who competed as a professional from 2011 to 2022. He competed in the Vuelta a España each year from 2018 to 2021. He now works as a directeur sportif for UCI ProTeam Caja Rural–Seguros RGA.

== Major results ==
2013
5th Overall Tour of China I
5th Overall Boucles de la Mayenne
2014
1st Overall Vuelta Ciclista a León
2016
7th Klasika Primavera
2018
9th Overall Tour of Norway
2021
Combativity award Stage 8 Vuelta a España
2022
2nd Overall Ronde de l'Oise

1st Mountains classification

=== Grand Tour general classification results timeline ===
Grand Tour	2018	2019	2020	2021
Giro d'Italia	—	—	—	—
Tour de France	—	—	—	—
Vuelta a España	78	117	92	87

Legend
—	Did not compete
DNF	Did not finish
