= El Gamoniteiru =

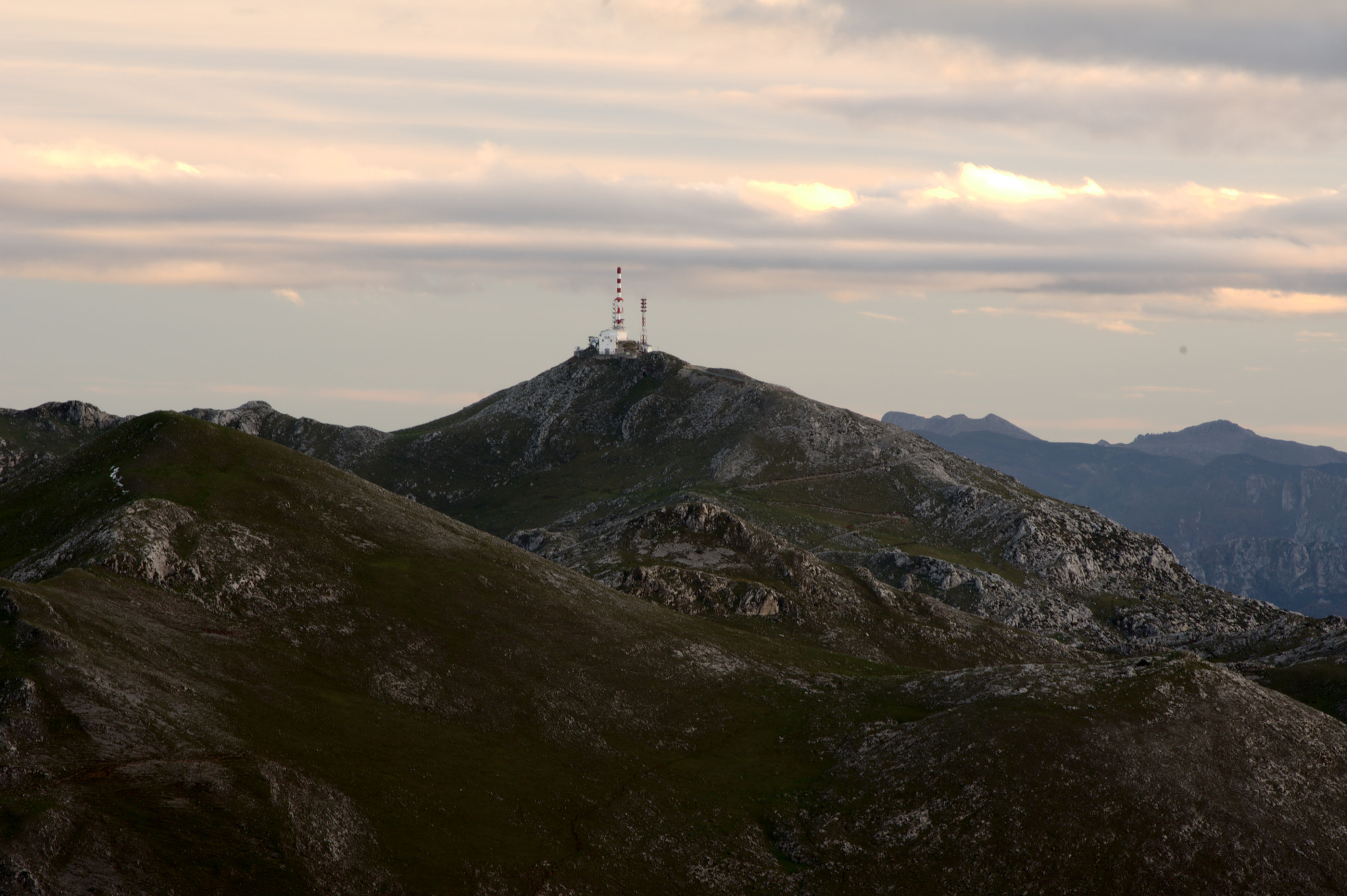
- El Gamoniteiru seen from the La Gamonal peak.
- Location: Asturias
- Gain in altitude: 1,791 m (5,876 ft)
- Length of climb: 15.1 km (9.4 mi)
- Average gradient: 9.69 %

El Gamoniteiru is a steep mountain road in Asturias, near La Vega-Riosa, in northern Spain. It is considered one of the most demanding climbs in professional road bicycle racing. It was climbed for the first time professionally in a UCI World Tour competition in the 2021 Vuelta a España. The road that gives access to it reaches 1786 meters above sea level, and is the mountain pass with the highest altitude in Asturias.

== Stage winners ==
Winners of El Gamoniteiru stage
Year	Rider
2021	Miguel Ángel López (COL)
