= 2021 Tour de Suisse =

Swiss cycling race

2021 UCI World Tour, race 20 of 29

Race details
- Dates: 6–13 June 2021
- Stages: 8
- Distance: 1,056.6 (Note: Stage 8's rerouting increased the race's overall distance from the original distance of 1,015.1 km (630.8 mi).) km (656.5 mi)
- Winning time: 24h 44' 01"

Results
Jersey awarded to the overall winner	Winner	Richard Carapaz (ECU)	(INEOS Grenadiers)
	Second	Rigoberto Urán (COL)	(EF Education–Nippo)
	Third	Jakob Fuglsang (DEN)	(Astana–Premier Tech)
Jersey awarded to the mountains classification winner	Mountains	Michael Woods (CAN)	(Israel Start-Up Nation)
Jersey awarded to the young rider classification winner	Young rider	Eddie Dunbar (IRL)	(INEOS Grenadiers)
Jersey awarded to the sprints classification winner	Sprints	Stefan Bissegger (SUI)	(EF Education–Nippo)
	Team	Team Jumbo–Visma	

The 2021 Tour de Suisse was a road cycling stage race that took place between 6 and 13 June 2021 in Switzerland. It was the 84th edition of the Tour de Suisse and the 20th event of the 2021 UCI World Tour.

== Teams ==
All nineteen UCI WorldTeams are joined by three UCI ProTeams and the Swiss national team to make up the twenty-three teams that are participating in the race. Each team entered a squad of seven riders, for a total of 161 riders who started the race. Before Stage 4, Intermarché–Wanty–Gobert Matériaux pulled out of the race after a staff member tested positive for COVID-19. 124 riders finished the race.

UCI WorldTeams

- AG2R Citroën Team
- Astana–Premier Tech
- Bora–Hansgrohe
- Cofidis
- Deceuninck–Quick-Step
- EF Education–Nippo
- Groupama–FDJ
- INEOS Grenadiers
- Intermarché–Wanty–Gobert Matériaux
- Israel Start-Up Nation
- Lotto–Soudal
- Movistar Team
- Team Bahrain Victorious
- Team BikeExchange
- Team DSM
- Team Jumbo–Visma
- Team Qhubeka Assos
- Trek–Segafredo
- UAE Team Emirates

UCI ProTeams

- Alpecin–Fenix
- Rally Cycling
- Total Direct Énergie

National Teams

- Switzerland

== Route ==
The 2021 route largely replicates that which was initially planned for the 2020 edition, which was cancelled due to the COVID-19 pandemic.

Stage characteristics and winners
Stage	Date	Route	Distance	Type	Winner
1	6 June	Frauenfeld to Frauenfeld	10.9 km (6.8 mi)	Individual time trial	Stefan Küng (SUI)
2	7 June	Neuhausen to Lachen	173 km (107 mi)	Hilly stage	Mathieu van der Poel (NED)
3	8 June	Lachen to Pfaffnau	185 km (115 mi)	Hilly stage	Mathieu van der Poel (NED)
4	9 June	St. Urban to Gstaad	171 km (106 mi)	Medium mountain stage	Stefan Bissegger (SUI)
5	10 June	Gstaad to Leukerbad	172 km (107 mi)	Mountain stage	Richard Carapaz (ECU)
6	11 June	Fiesch to Disentis-Sedrun	162 km (101 mi)	Mountain stage	Andreas Kron (DEN)
7	12 June	Disentis-Sedrun to Andermatt	23.2 km (14.4 mi)	Mountain time trial	Rigoberto Urán (COL)
8	13 June	Andermatt to Andermatt	159.5 km (99.1 mi) (Note: The stage was originally 118 kilometres (73 mi) long, but race organisers rerouted the stage due to weather conditions atop some of the originally included mountains, thereby increasing its distance by 41.5 km (25.8 mi).)	Mountain stage	Gino Mäder (SUI)
Total			1,056.6 km (656.5 mi)		

== Stages ==
=== Stage 1 ===
6 June 2021 — Frauenfeld to Frauenfeld, 10.9 km (6.8 mi) (ITT)

Stage 1 Result
Rank	Rider	Team	Time
1	Stefan Küng (SUI)	Groupama–FDJ	12' 00"
2	Stefan Bissegger (SUI)	EF Education–Nippo	+ 4"
3	Mattia Cattaneo (ITA)	Deceuninck–Quick-Step	+ 12"
4	Tom Scully (NZL)	EF Education–Nippo	+ 15"
5	Julian Alaphilippe (FRA)	Deceuninck–Quick-Step	+ 19"
6	Jonas Rutsch (GER)	EF Education–Nippo	+ 22"
7	Jannik Steimle (GER)	Deceuninck–Quick-Step	+ 22"
8	Florian Vermeersch (BEL)	Lotto–Soudal	+ 22"
9	Søren Kragh Andersen (DEN)	Team DSM	+ 22"
10	Rohan Dennis (AUS)	INEOS Grenadiers	+ 23"

General classification after Stage 1
Rank	Rider	Team	Time
1	Stefan Küng (SUI)	Groupama–FDJ	12' 00"
2	Stefan Bissegger (SUI)	EF Education–Nippo	+ 4"
3	Mattia Cattaneo (ITA)	Deceuninck–Quick-Step	+ 12"
4	Tom Scully (NZL)	EF Education–Nippo	+ 15"
5	Julian Alaphilippe (FRA)	Deceuninck–Quick-Step	+ 19"
6	Jonas Rutsch (GER)	EF Education–Nippo	+ 22"
7	Jannik Steimle (GER)	Deceuninck–Quick-Step	+ 22"
8	Florian Vermeersch (BEL)	Lotto–Soudal	+ 22"
9	Søren Kragh Andersen (DEN)	Team DSM	+ 22"
10	Rohan Dennis (AUS)	INEOS Grenadiers	+ 23"

=== Stage 2 ===
7 June 2021 — Neuhausen to Lachen, 173 km (107 mi)

Stage 2 Result
Rank	Rider	Team	Time
1	Mathieu van der Poel (NED)	Alpecin–Fenix	4h 12' 30"
2	Maximilian Schachmann (GER)	Bora–Hansgrohe	+ 1"
3	Wout Poels (NED)	Team Bahrain Victorious	+ 4"
4	Iván García Cortina (ESP)	Movistar Team	+ 4"
5	Marc Hirschi (SUI)	UAE Team Emirates	+ 4"
6	Richard Carapaz (ECU)	INEOS Grenadiers	+ 4"
7	Michael Woods (CAN)	Israel Start-Up Nation	+ 4"
8	Julian Alaphilippe (FRA)	Deceuninck–Quick-Step	+ 4"
9	Jakob Fuglsang (DEN)	Astana–Premier Tech	+ 4"
10	Andreas Kron (DEN)	Lotto–Soudal	+ 9"

General classification after Stage 2
Rank	Rider	Team	Time
1	Stefan Küng (SUI)	Groupama–FDJ	4h 24' 52"
2	Julian Alaphilippe (FRA)	Deceuninck–Quick-Step	+ 1"
3	Maximilian Schachmann (GER)	Bora–Hansgrohe	+ 2"
4	Mathieu van der Poel (NED)	Alpecin–Fenix	+ 6"
5	Iván García Cortina (ESP)	Movistar Team	+ 12"
6	Mattia Cattaneo (ITA)	Deceuninck–Quick-Step	+ 12"
7	Richard Carapaz (ECU)	INEOS Grenadiers	+ 13"
8	Neilson Powless (USA)	EF Education–Nippo	+ 25"
9	Gino Mäder (SUI)	Team Bahrain Victorious	+ 30"
10	Andreas Kron (DEN)	Lotto–Soudal	+ 33"

=== Stage 3 ===
8 June 2021 — Lachen to Pfaffnau, 185 km (115 mi)

Stage 3 Result
Rank	Rider	Team	Time
1	Mathieu van der Poel (NED)	Alpecin–Fenix	4h 24' 26"
2	Christophe Laporte (FRA)	Cofidis	+ 0"
3	Julian Alaphilippe (FRA)	Deceuninck–Quick-Step	+ 0"
4	Michael Matthews (AUS)	Team BikeExchange	+ 0"
5	Maximilian Schachmann (GER)	Bora–Hansgrohe	+ 0"
6	Alexander Kamp (DEN)	Trek–Segafredo	+ 0"
7	Tiesj Benoot (BEL)	Team DSM	+ 0"
8	Omar Fraile (ESP)	Astana–Premier Tech	+ 0"
9	Anthony Turgis (FRA)	Total Direct Énergie	+ 0"
10	Michael Woods (CAN)	Israel Start-Up Nation	+ 0"

General classification after Stage 3
Rank	Rider	Team	Time
1	Mathieu van der Poel (NED)	Alpecin–Fenix	8h 49' 14"
2	Julian Alaphilippe (FRA)	Deceuninck–Quick-Step	+ 1"
3	Stefan Küng (SUI)	Groupama–FDJ	+ 4"
4	Maximilian Schachmann (GER)	Bora–Hansgrohe	+ 6"
5	Mattia Cattaneo (ITA)	Deceuninck–Quick-Step	+ 13"
6	Iván García Cortina (ESP)	Movistar Team	+ 16"
7	Richard Carapaz (ECU)	INEOS Grenadiers	+ 17"
8	Neilson Powless (USA)	EF Education–Nippo	+ 29"
9	Andreas Kron (DEN)	Lotto–Soudal	+ 37"
10	Rigoberto Urán (COL)	EF Education–Nippo	+ 39"

=== Stage 4 ===
9 June 2021 — St. Urban to Gstaad, 171 km (106 mi)

Before the stage, Intermarché–Wanty–Gobert Matériaux pulled out of the race after a staff member tested positive for COVID-19.

Stage 4 Result
Rank	Rider	Team	Time
1	Stefan Bissegger (SUI)	EF Education–Nippo	3h 46' 21"
2	Benjamin Thomas (FRA)	Groupama–FDJ	+ 0"
3	Joey Rosskopf (USA)	Rally Cycling	+ 0"
4	Joel Suter (SUI)	Switzerland	+ 23"
5	Edward Theuns (BEL)	Trek–Segafredo	+ 5' 16"
6	Juan Sebastián Molano (COL)	UAE Team Emirates	+ 5' 16"
7	Omar Fraile (ESP)	Astana–Premier Tech	+ 5' 16"
8	Mike Teunissen (NED)	Team Jumbo–Visma	+ 5' 16"
9	Fred Wright (GBR)	Team Bahrain Victorious	+ 5' 16"
10	Michael Matthews (AUS)	Team BikeExchange	+ 5' 16"

General classification after Stage 4
Rank	Rider	Team	Time
1	Mathieu van der Poel (NED)	Alpecin–Fenix	12h 40' 51"
2	Julian Alaphilippe (FRA)	Deceuninck–Quick-Step	+ 1"
3	Stefan Küng (SUI)	Groupama–FDJ	+ 4"
4	Maximilian Schachmann (GER)	Bora–Hansgrohe	+ 6"
5	Mattia Cattaneo (ITA)	Deceuninck–Quick-Step	+ 13"
6	Iván García Cortina (ESP)	Movistar Team	+ 16"
7	Richard Carapaz (ECU)	INEOS Grenadiers	+ 17"
8	Neilson Powless (USA)	EF Education–Nippo	+ 29"
9	Andreas Kron (DEN)	Lotto–Soudal	+ 37"
10	Stefan Bissegger (SUI)	EF Education–Nippo	+ 38"

=== Stage 5 ===
10 June 2021 — Gstaad to Leukerbad, 172 km (107 mi), 177 km (110 mi)

After the stage, race commissaires handed Julian Alaphilippe a 20-second penalty and a 200CHF fine for taking an illegal feed inside the last 20 kilometres (12 mi) of the stage.

Stage 5 Result
Rank	Rider	Team	Time
1	Richard Carapaz (ECU)	INEOS Grenadiers	4h 01' 52"
2	Jakob Fuglsang (DEN)	Astana–Premier Tech	+ 0"
3	Michael Woods (CAN)	Israel Start-Up Nation	+ 39"
4	Lucas Hamilton (AUS)	Team BikeExchange	+ 39"
5	Rigoberto Urán (COL)	EF Education–Nippo	+ 39"
6	Maximilian Schachmann (GER)	Bora–Hansgrohe	+ 39"
7	Julian Alaphilippe (FRA)	Deceuninck–Quick-Step	+ 39"
8	Domenico Pozzovivo (ITA)	Team Qhubeka Assos	+ 39"
9	Esteban Chaves (COL)	Team BikeExchange	+ 49"
10	Sam Oomen (NED)	Team Jumbo–Visma	+ 1' 22"

General classification after Stage 5
Rank	Rider	Team	Time
1	Richard Carapaz (ECU)	INEOS Grenadiers	16h 42' 50"
2	Jakob Fuglsang (DEN)	Astana–Premier Tech	+ 26"
3	Maximilian Schachmann (GER)	Bora–Hansgrohe	+ 38"
4	Julian Alaphilippe (FRA)	Deceuninck–Quick-Step	+ 53"
5	Rigoberto Urán (COL)	EF Education–Nippo	+ 1' 11"
6	Lucas Hamilton (AUS)	Team BikeExchange	+ 1' 31"
7	Michael Woods (CAN)	Israel Start-Up Nation	+ 1' 32"
8	Sam Oomen (NED)	Team Jumbo–Visma	+ 2' 19"
9	Esteban Chaves (COL)	Team BikeExchange	+ 2' 22"
10	Domenico Pozzovivo (ITA)	Team Qhubeka Assos	+ 3' 10"

=== Stage 6 ===
11 June 2021 — Fiesch to Disentis-Sedrun, 162 km (101 mi), 120.2 km (74.7 mi)

Originally, Rui Costa narrowly beat Andreas Kron in a two-up sprint. However, after the stage, race commissaires relegated Costa for having deviated from his sprinting line and thus impeding Kron's sprint.

Stage 6 Result
Rank	Rider	Team	Time
1	Andreas Kron (DEN)	Lotto–Soudal	3h 14' 52"
2	Rui Costa (POR)	UAE Team Emirates	+ 0"
3	Hermann Pernsteiner (AUT)	Team Bahrain Victorious	+ 1"
4	Gonzalo Serrano (ESP)	Movistar Team	+ 3"
5	Pierre Latour (FRA)	Total Direct Énergie	+ 3"
6	Hugo Houle (CAN)	Astana–Premier Tech	+ 3"
7	Neilson Powless (USA)	EF Education–Nippo	+ 3"
8	Antwan Tolhoek (NED)	Team Jumbo–Visma	+ 3"
9	Matteo Fabbro (ITA)	Bora–Hansgrohe	+ 50"
10	Andreas Leknessund (NOR)	Team DSM	+ 1' 00"

General classification after Stage 6
Rank	Rider	Team	Time
1	Richard Carapaz (ECU)	INEOS Grenadiers	20h 00' 31"
2	Jakob Fuglsang (DEN)	Astana–Premier Tech	+ 26"
3	Maximilian Schachmann (GER)	Bora–Hansgrohe	+ 38"
4	Julian Alaphilippe (FRA)	Deceuninck–Quick-Step	+ 53"
5	Rigoberto Urán (COL)	EF Education–Nippo	+ 1' 11"
6	Michael Woods (CAN)	Israel Start-Up Nation	+ 1' 32"
7	Sam Oomen (NED)	Team Jumbo–Visma	+ 2' 19"
8	Esteban Chaves (COL)	Team BikeExchange	+ 2' 22"
9	Domenico Pozzovivo (ITA)	Team Qhubeka Assos	+ 3' 10"
10	Rui Costa (POR)	UAE Team Emirates	+ 3' 37"

=== Stage 7 ===
12 June 2021 — Disentis-Sedrun to Andermatt, 23.2 km (14.4 mi) (ITT)

Stage 7 Result
Rank	Rider	Team	Time
1	Rigoberto Urán (COL)	EF Education–Nippo	36' 02"
2	Julian Alaphilippe (FRA)	Deceuninck–Quick-Step	+ 40"
3	Gino Mäder (SUI)	Team Bahrain Victorious	+ 54"
4	Richard Carapaz (ECU)	INEOS Grenadiers	+ 54"
5	Tom Dumoulin (NED)	Team Jumbo–Visma	+ 56"
6	Mattia Cattaneo (ITA)	Deceuninck–Quick-Step	+ 58"
7	Domenico Pozzovivo (ITA)	Team Qhubeka Assos	+ 1' 00"
8	Rui Costa (POR)	UAE Team Emirates	+ 1' 00"
9	Søren Kragh Andersen (DEN)	Team DSM	+ 1' 04"
10	Stefan Küng (SUI)	Groupama–FDJ	+ 1' 05"

General classification after Stage 7
Rank	Rider	Team	Time
1	Richard Carapaz (ECU)	INEOS Grenadiers	20h 37' 27"
2	Rigoberto Urán (COL)	EF Education–Nippo	+ 17"
3	Julian Alaphilippe (FRA)	Deceuninck–Quick-Step	+ 39"
4	Maximilian Schachmann (GER)	Bora–Hansgrohe	+ 1' 07"
5	Jakob Fuglsang (DEN)	Astana–Premier Tech	+ 1' 15"
6	Michael Woods (CAN)	Israel Start-Up Nation	+ 3' 10"
7	Domenico Pozzovivo (ITA)	Team Qhubeka Assos	+ 3' 16"
8	Sam Oomen (NED)	Team Jumbo–Visma	+ 3' 39"
9	Rui Costa (POR)	UAE Team Emirates	+ 3' 43"
10	Esteban Chaves (COL)	Team BikeExchange	+ 4' 29"

=== Stage 8 ===
13 June 2021 — Andermatt to Andermatt, ~~118 km (73 mi)~~ 159.5 km (99.1 mi)

Stage 8 Result
Rank	Rider	Team	Time
1	Gino Mäder (SUI)	Team Bahrain Victorious	4h 06' 25"
2	Michael Woods (CAN)	Israel Start-Up Nation	+ 0"
3	Mattia Cattaneo (ITA)	Deceuninck–Quick-Step	+ 9"
4	Eddie Dunbar (IRL)	INEOS Grenadiers	+ 9"
5	Richard Carapaz (ECU)	INEOS Grenadiers	+ 9"
6	Rui Costa (POR)	UAE Team Emirates	+ 9"
7	Rigoberto Urán (COL)	EF Education–Nippo	+ 9"
8	Domenico Pozzovivo (ITA)	Team Qhubeka Assos	+ 9"
9	Jakob Fuglsang (DEN)	Astana–Premier Tech	+ 9"
10	Maximilian Schachmann (GER)	Bora–Hansgrohe	+ 21"

General classification after Stage 8
Rank	Rider	Team	Time
1	Richard Carapaz (ECU)	INEOS Grenadiers	24h 44' 01"
2	Rigoberto Urán (COL)	EF Education–Nippo	+ 17"
3	Jakob Fuglsang (DEN)	Astana–Premier Tech	+ 1' 15"
4	Maximilian Schachmann (GER)	Bora–Hansgrohe	+ 1' 19"
5	Michael Woods (CAN)	Israel Start-Up Nation	+ 2' 55"
6	Domenico Pozzovivo (ITA)	Team Qhubeka Assos	+ 3' 16"
7	Rui Costa (POR)	UAE Team Emirates	+ 3' 43"
8	Sam Oomen (NED)	Team Jumbo–Visma	+ 4' 16"
9	Mattia Cattaneo (ITA)	Deceuninck–Quick-Step	+ 4' 39"
10	Esteban Chaves (COL)	Team BikeExchange	+ 5' 33"

== Classification leadership table ==
Classification leadership by stage
Stage	Winner	General classification	Sprints classification	Mountains classification	Young rider classification	Team classification	Most active rider award
1	Stefan Küng	Stefan Küng	Stefan Küng	Not awarded	Stefan Bissegger	EF Education–Nippo	Stefan Küng
2	Mathieu van der Poel	Stefan Küng	Stefan Küng	Tom Bohli	Neilson Powless	Deceuninck–Quick-Step	Claudio Imhof
3	Mathieu van der Poel	Mathieu van der Poel	Mathieu van der Poel	Nickolas Zukowsky	Neilson Powless	Deceuninck–Quick-Step	Rémy Rochas
4	Stefan Bissegger	Mathieu van der Poel	Mathieu van der Poel	Nickolas Zukowsky	Neilson Powless	EF Education–Nippo	Benjamin Thomas
5	Richard Carapaz	Richard Carapaz	Mathieu van der Poel	Esteban Chaves	Lucas Hamilton	Deceuninck–Quick-Step	Hermann Pernsteiner
6	Andreas Kron	Richard Carapaz	Stefan Bissegger	Antonio Nibali	Andreas Leknessund	Deceuninck–Quick-Step	David de la Cruz
7	Rigoberto Urán	Richard Carapaz	Stefan Bissegger	Antonio Nibali	Andreas Leknessund	Deceuninck–Quick-Step	Rigoberto Urán
8	Gino Mäder	Richard Carapaz	Stefan Bissegger	Michael Woods	Eddie Dunbar	Team Jumbo–Visma	Gino Mäder
Final		Richard Carapaz	Stefan Bissegger	Michael Woods	Eddie Dunbar	Team Jumbo–Visma	Not awarded

- On stage 2, Mattia Cattaneo, who was third in the points classification, wore the black jersey, because first placed Stefan Küng wore the yellow jersey as the leader of the general classification and second placed Stefan Bissegger wore the white jersey as the leader of the young rider classification.
- On stage 3, Mathieu van der Poel, who was second in the points classification, wore the black jersey, because first placed Stefan Küng wore the yellow jersey as the leader of the general classification.
- On stage 4, Stefan Küng, who was second in the points classification, wore the black jersey, because first placed Mathieu van der Poel wore the yellow jersey as the leader of the general classification. For the same reason, Stefan Bissegger wore the black jersey on stage 5.
- Before stage 6, Mathieu van der Poel, who was leading the points classification, and Lucas Hamilton, who was leading the young rider classification, both abandoned the race due to illness. As a result, on stage 6, Stefan Bissegger, who was second in the points classification, wore the black jersey, while Eddie Dunbar, who was second in the young rider classification, wore the white jersey.

== Final classification standings ==
Legend
Denotes the winner of the general classification	Denotes the winner of the young rider classification
Denotes the winner of the points classification	Denotes the winner of the most active rider award
Denotes the winner of the mountains classification	

=== General classification ===
Final general classification (1–10)
Rank	Rider	Team	Time
1	Richard Carapaz (ECU)	INEOS Grenadiers	24h 44' 01"
2	Rigoberto Urán (COL)	EF Education–Nippo	+ 17"
3	Jakob Fuglsang (DEN)	Astana–Premier Tech	+ 1' 15"
4	Maximilian Schachmann (GER)	Bora–Hansgrohe	+ 1' 19"
5	Michael Woods (CAN)	Israel Start-Up Nation	+ 2' 55"
6	Domenico Pozzovivo (ITA)	Team Qhubeka Assos	+ 3' 16"
7	Rui Costa (POR)	UAE Team Emirates	+ 3' 43"
8	Sam Oomen (NED)	Team Jumbo–Visma	+ 4' 16"
9	Mattia Cattaneo (ITA)	Deceuninck–Quick-Step	+ 4' 39"
10	Esteban Chaves (COL)	Team BikeExchange	+ 5' 33"

=== Points classification ===
Final points classification (1–10)
Rank	Rider	Team	Points
1	Stefan Bissegger (SUI)	EF Education–Nippo	21
2	Mattia Cattaneo (ITA)	Deceuninck–Quick-Step	20
3	Richard Carapaz (ECU)	INEOS Grenadiers	18
4	Gino Mäder (SUI)	Team Bahrain Victorious	18
5	Stefan Küng (SUI)	Groupama–FDJ	16
6	Claudio Imhof (SUI)	Switzerland	16
7	Michael Woods (CAN)	Israel Start-Up Nation	15
8	Rigoberto Urán (COL)	EF Education–Nippo	14
9	Andreas Kron (DEN)	Lotto–Soudal	14
10	Joey Rosskopf (USA)	Rally Cycling	12

=== Mountains classification ===
Final mountains classification (1–10)
Rank	Rider	Team	Points
1	Michael Woods (CAN)	Israel Start-Up Nation	29
2	David de la Cruz (ESP)	UAE Team Emirates	29
3	Sergio Samitier (ESP)	Movistar Team	29
4	Antonio Nibali (ITA)	Trek–Segafredo	28
5	Wout Poels (NED)	Team Bahrain Victorious	24
6	Gino Mäder (SUI)	Team Bahrain Victorious	19
7	Rigoberto Urán (COL)	EF Education–Nippo	16
8	Mattia Cattaneo (ITA)	Deceuninck–Quick-Step	16
9	Gavin Mannion (USA)	Rally Cycling	14
10	Jakob Fuglsang (DEN)	Astana–Premier Tech	14

=== Young rider classification ===
Final young rider classification (1–10)
Rank	Rider	Team	Time
1	Eddie Dunbar (IRL)	INEOS Grenadiers	24h 50' 16"
2	Neilson Powless (USA)	EF Education–Nippo	+ 1' 39"
3	Andreas Kron (DEN)	Lotto–Soudal	+ 7' 26"
4	Andreas Leknessund (NOR)	Team DSM	+ 11' 12"
5	Stefan de Bod (RSA)	Astana–Premier Tech	+ 12' 03"
6	Gino Mäder (SUI)	Team Bahrain Victorious	+ 15' 06"
7	Gijs Leemreize (NED)	Team Jumbo–Visma	+ 15' 20"
8	Marc Hirschi (SUI)	UAE Team Emirates	+ 22' 47"
9	Cristian Camilo Muñoz (COL)	UAE Team Emirates	+ 23' 46"
10	Stephen Williams (GBR)	Team Bahrain Victorious	+ 28' 52"

=== Team classification ===
Final team classification (1–10)
Rank	Team	Time
1	(Netherlands) Team Jumbo–Visma	62h 00' 10"
2	Team Bahrain Victorious	+ 1' 07"
3	(Kazakhstan) Astana–Premier Tech	+ 1' 51"
4	(United Kingdom) INEOS Grenadiers	+ 3' 16"
5	(United States) EF Education–Nippo	+ 11' 31"
6	(Belgium) Deceuninck–Quick-Step	+ 14' 45"
7	(United Arab Emirates) UAE Team Emirates	+ 15' 05"
8	(Germany) Team DSM	+ 18' 03"
9	(France) Total Direct Énergie	+ 18' 05"
10	(Spain) Movistar Team	+ 18' 47"
