= Velefique =

Velefique, Spain
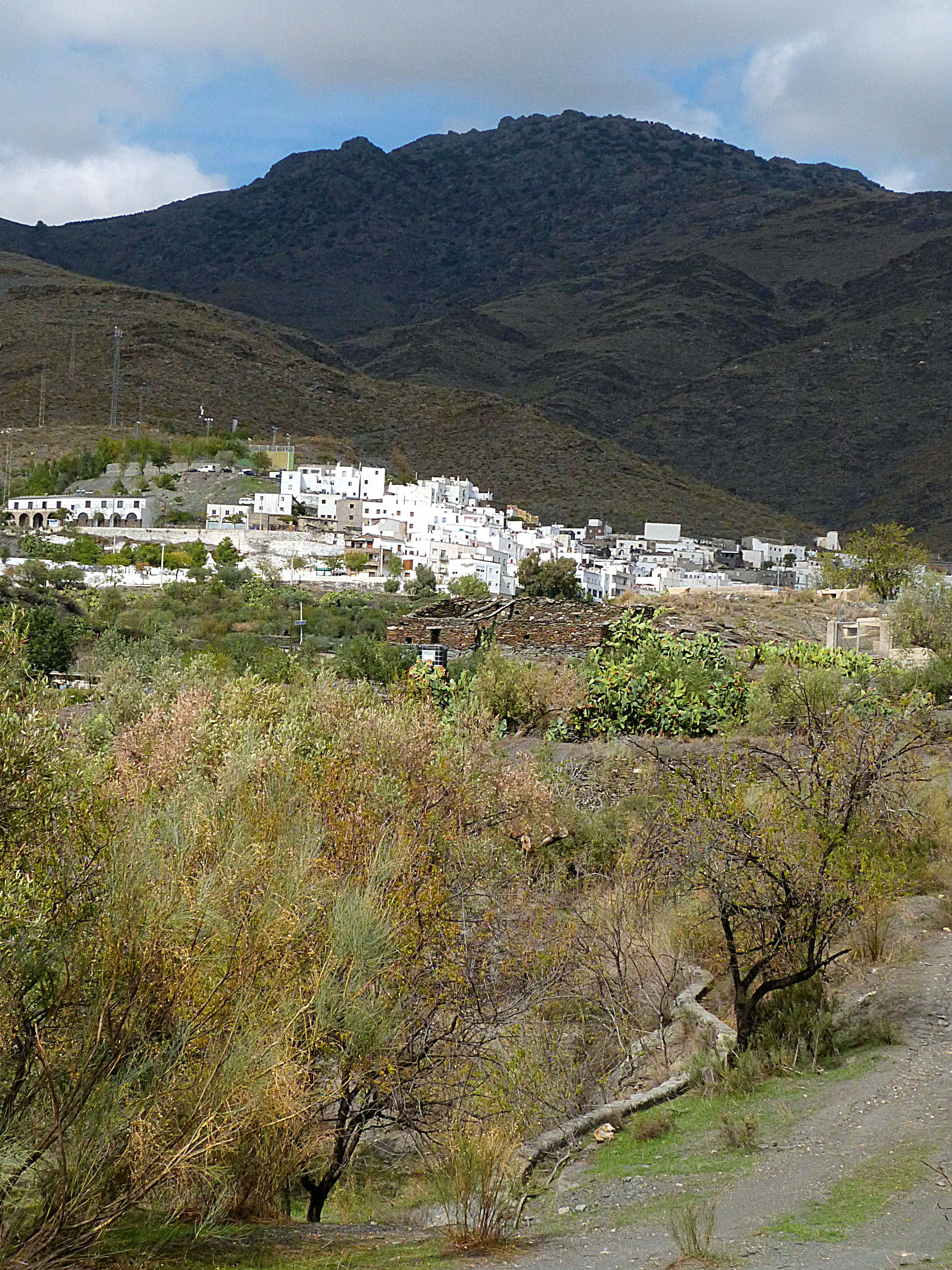
- View of Velefique
- Interactive map of Velefique, Spain
- Coordinates: 37°11′N 2°24′W
- Country: Spain
- Community: Andalusia
- Municipality: Almería

Government
  - Mayor: Rafael García Sola (IU)

Area
  - Total: 65 km^{2} (25 sq mi)
- Elevation: 930 m (3,050 ft)

Population (2025-01-01)
  - Total: 230
  - Density: 3.5/km^{2} (9.2/sq mi)
- Time zone: UTC+1 (CET)
  - Summer (DST): UTC+2 (CEST)

Velefique is a municipality of Almería province, in the autonomous community of Andalusia, Spain.

== Demographics ==
Historical population
Year	Pop.	±%
1999	313	—
2000	314	+0.3%
2001	318	+1.3%
2002	310	−2.5%
2003	284	−8.4%
2004	263	−7.4%
2005	261	−0.8%
2018	253	−3.1%
Source: INE (Spain)

== See also ==
- List of municipalities in Almería
