= List of 2022 UCI WorldTeams and riders =

This page is a list of 2022 UCI WorldTeams. These 18 teams are competing in the 2022 UCI World Tour.

== Teams overview ==
2022 UCI World Teams
Code	Official Team Name	Country	Continent	Groupset	Bike Manufacturer	Road Bike(s)	Time Trial Bike	Wheels
ACT	AG2R Citroën Team	France	Europe	Campagnolo	BMC	Teammachine SLR01; Timemachine Road	Timemachine	Campagnolo
AST	Astana Qazaqstan Team	Kazakhstan	Asia	Shimano	Wilier	Filante SLR; 0 SLR		Corima
BOH	Bora–Hansgrohe	Germany	Europe	Shimano	Specialized			Roval
COF	Cofidis	France	Europe	Campagnolo	De Rosa			Corima
EFE	EF Education–EasyPost	United States	North America	Shimano	Cannondale			Vision
GFC	Groupama–FDJ	France	Europe	Shimano	Lapierre			Shimano
IGD	Ineos Grenadiers	Great Britain	Europe	Shimano	Pinarello			Shimano
IWG	Intermarché–Wanty–Gobert Matériaux	Belgium	Europe	Shimano	Cube			Newmen
IPT	Israel–Premier Tech	Israel	Asia	Shimano	Factor			Black Inc
LTS	Lotto–Soudal	Belgium	Europe	Shimano	Ridley			DT Swiss
MOV	Movistar Team	Spain	Europe	SRAM	Canyon			Zipp
QST	Quick-Step Alpha Vinyl Team	Belgium	Europe	Shimano	Specialized	S-Works Tarmac SL7; S-Works Roubaix	S-Works SHIV TT DISC	Roval
TBV	Team Bahrain Victorious	Bahrain	Asia	Shimano	Merida			Vision
BEX	Team BikeExchange–Jayco	Australia	Oceania	Shimano	Giant			Cadex
DSM	Team DSM	Netherlands	Europe	Shimano	Scott			Shimano
TJV	Team Jumbo–Visma	Netherlands	Europe	Shimano	Cervélo			Shimano
TFS	Trek–Segafredo	United States	North America	SRAM	Trek			Bontrager
UAD	UAE Team Emirates	United Arab Emirates	Asia	Campagnolo	Colnago			Campagnolo

== Riders ==
=== AG2R Citroën Team ===
As of 5 January 2022.

Rider	Date of birth
Clément Berthet (FRA)	2 August 1997 (aged 24)
Geoffrey Bouchard (FRA)	1 April 1992 (aged 29)
Lilian Calmejane (FRA)	6 December 1992 (aged 29)
Clément Champoussin (FRA)	29 May 1998 (aged 23)
Mickaël Cherel (FRA)	17 March 1986 (aged 35)
Benoît Cosnefroy (FRA)	17 October 1995 (aged 26)
Stan Dewulf (BEL)	20 December 1997 (aged 24)
Felix Gall (AUT)	27 February 1998 (aged 23)
Dorian Godon (FRA)	25 May 1996 (aged 25)
Jaakko Hänninen (FIN)	16 April 1997 (aged 24)
Anthony Jullien (FRA)	5 March 1998 (aged 23)
Bob Jungels (LUX)	22 September 1992 (aged 29)
Paul Lapeira (FRA)	25 February 2000 (aged 21)
Lawrence Naesen (BEL)	28 August 1992 (aged 29)
Oliver Naesen (BEL)	16 September 1990 (aged 31)

Rider	Date of birth
Ben O'Connor (AUS)	25 November 1995 (aged 26)
Aurélien Paret-Peintre (FRA)	27 February 1996 (aged 25)
Valentin Paret-Peintre (FRA)	14 January 2001 (aged 20)
Nans Peters (FRA)	12 March 1994 (aged 27)
Nicolas Prodhomme (FRA)	1 February 1997 (aged 24)
Antoine Raugel (FRA)	14 February 1999 (aged 22)
Valentin Retailleau (Note: Retailleau joined the team on 1 August.) (FRA)	18 June 2000 (aged 21)
Marc Sarreau (FRA)	10 June 1993 (aged 28)
Michael Schär (SUI)	29 September 1986 (aged 35)
Damien Touzé (FRA)	7 July 1996 (aged 25)
Greg Van Avermaet (BEL)	17 May 1985 (aged 36)
Gijs Van Hoecke (BEL)	12 November 1991 (aged 30)
Andrea Vendrame (ITA)	20 July 1994 (aged 27)
Clement Venturini (FRA)	16 October 1993 (aged 28)
Larry Warbasse (USA)	28 January 1990 (aged 31)

=== Astana Qazaqstan Team ===
As of 3 January 2022.

Rider	Date of birth
Leonardo Basso (ITA)	25 December 1993 (aged 28)
Samuele Battistella (ITA)	14 November 1998 (aged 23)
Manuele Boaro (ITA)	12 March 1987 (aged 34)
Gleb Brussenskiy (KAZ)	18 April 2000 (aged 21)
Valerio Conti (ITA)	30 March 1993 (aged 28)
Stefan de Bod (RSA)	17 November 1996 (aged 25)
David de la Cruz (ESP)	6 May 1989 (aged 32)
Joe Dombrowski (USA)	12 May 1991 (aged 30)
Yevgeniy Fedorov (KAZ)	16 February 2000 (aged 21)
Fabio Felline (ITA)	29 March 1990 (aged 31)
Michele Gazzoli (Note: Gazzoli was removed by team on 10 August due to his suspension by the UCI.) (ITA)	14 March 1999 (aged 22)
Yevgeniy Gidich (KAZ)	19 May 1996 (aged 25)
Dmitriy Gruzdev (KAZ)	13 March 1986 (aged 35)
Sebastián Henao (Note: Henao left the team on 31 July.) (COL)	5 August 1993 (aged 28)
Miguel Ángel López (COL)	4 April 1994 (aged 27)

Rider	Date of birth
Alexey Lutsenko (KAZ)	7 September 1992 (aged 29)
Davide Martinelli (ITA)	31 May 1993 (aged 28)
Gianni Moscon (ITA)	20 April 1994 (aged 27)
Yuriy Natarov (KAZ)	28 December 1996 (aged 25)
Antonio Nibali (ITA)	23 September 1992 (aged 29)
Vincenzo Nibali (ITA)	14 November 1984 (aged 37)
Nurbergen Nurlykhassym (KAZ)	25 March 2000 (aged 21)
Vadim Pronskiy (KAZ)	4 June 1998 (aged 23)
Alexandr Riabushenko (BLR)	12 October 1995 (aged 26)
Javier Romo (ESP)	6 January 1999 (aged 22)
Christian Scaroni (Note: Scaroni joined from Gazprom–RusVelo on 28 July.) (ITA)	16 October 1997 (aged 24)
Harold Tejada (COL)	27 April 1997 (aged 24)
Simone Velasco (ITA)	2 December 1995 (aged 26)
Artyom Zakharov (KAZ)	27 October 1991 (aged 30)
Andrey Zeits (KAZ)	14 December 1986 (aged 35)

=== Bora–Hansgrohe ===
As of 7 January 2022.

Rider	Date of birth
Giovanni Aleotti (ITA)	25 May 1999 (aged 22)
Shane Archbold (NZL)	2 February 1989 (aged 32)
Cesare Benedetti (POL)	3 August 1987 (aged 34)
Sam Bennett (IRL)	16 October 1990 (aged 31)
Emanuel Buchmann (GER)	18 November 1992 (aged 29)
Matteo Fabbro (ITA)	10 April 1995 (aged 26)
Patrick Gamper (AUT)	18 February 1997 (aged 24)
Felix Großschartner (AUT)	23 December 1993 (aged 28)
Marco Haller (AUT)	1 April 1991 (aged 30)
Sergio Higuita (COL)	1 August 1997 (aged 24)
Jai Hindley (AUS)	5 May 1996 (aged 25)
Lennard Kämna (GER)	9 September 1996 (aged 25)
Wilco Kelderman (NED)	25 March 1991 (aged 30)
Jonas Koch (GER)	25 June 1993 (aged 28)
Patrick Konrad (AUT)	13 October 1991 (aged 30)

Rider	Date of birth
Martin Laas (EST)	15 September 1993 (aged 28)
Luis-Joe Lührs (GER)	20 January 2003 (aged 18)
Jordi Meeus (BEL)	1 July 1998 (aged 23)
Ryan Mullen (IRL)	7 August 1994 (aged 27)
Anton Palzer (GER)	11 March 1993 (aged 28)
Nils Politt (GER)	6 March 1994 (aged 27)
Lukas Pöstlberger (AUT)	10 January 1992 (aged 29)
Max Schachmann (GER)	9 January 1994 (aged 27)
Ide Schelling (NED)	6 February 1998 (aged 23)
Cian Uijtdebroeks (BEL)	28 February 2003 (aged 18)
Danny van Poppel (NED)	26 July 1993 (aged 28)
Aleksandr Vlasov (RUS)	23 April 1996 (aged 25)
Matt Walls (GBR)	20 April 1998 (aged 23)
Frederik Wandahl (DEN)	9 May 2001 (aged 20)
Ben Zwiehoff (GER)	22 February 1994 (aged 27)

=== Cofidis ===
As of 29 January 2022.

Rider	Date of birth
Piet Allegaert (BEL)	20 January 1995 (aged 26)
Sander Armée (BEL)	10 December 1985 (aged 36)
François Bidard (FRA)	12 March 1992 (aged 29)
Tom Bohli (SUI)	17 January 1994 (aged 27)
André Carvalho (POR)	31 October 1997 (aged 24)
Thomas Champion (FRA)	8 September 1999 (aged 22)
Davide Cimolai (ITA)	13 August 1989 (aged 32)
Simone Consonni (ITA)	12 September 1994 (aged 27)
Bryan Coquard (FRA)	25 April 1992 (aged 29)
Alexandre Delettre (FRA)	25 October 1997 (aged 24)
Rubén Fernández (ESP)	1 March 1991 (aged 30)
Eddy Finé (FRA)	20 November 1997 (aged 24)
Simon Geschke (GER)	13 March 1986 (aged 35)
Jesús Herrada (ESP)	26 July 1990 (aged 31)
José Herrada (ESP)	1 October 1985 (aged 36)
Ion Izagirre (ESP)	4 February 1989 (aged 32)

Rider	Date of birth
Wesley Kreder (NED)	4 November 1990 (aged 31)
Victor Lafay (FRA)	17 January 1996 (aged 25)
Guillaume Martin (FRA)	9 June 1993 (aged 28)
Anthony Perez (FRA)	22 April 1991 (aged 30)
Pierre-Luc Périchon (FRA)	4 January 1987 (aged 34)
Alexis Renard (FRA)	1 June 1999 (aged 22)
Rémy Rochas (FRA)	18 May 1996 (aged 25)
Szymon Sajnok (POL)	24 August 1997 (aged 24)
Benjamin Thomas (FRA)	12 September 1995 (aged 26)
Hugo Toumire (FRA)	5 October 2001 (aged 20)
Kenneth Vanbilsen (BEL)	1 June 1990 (aged 31)
Davide Villella (ITA)	27 June 1991 (aged 30)
Jelle Wallays (BEL)	11 May 1989 (aged 32)
Max Walscheid (GER)	13 June 1993 (aged 28)
Axel Zingle (FRA)	18 December 1998 (aged 23)

=== EF Education–EasyPost ===
As of 11 January 2022.

Rider	Date of birth
Daniel Arroyave (COL)	19 June 2000 (aged 21)
Alberto Bettiol (ITA)	29 October 1993 (aged 28)
Stefan Bissegger (SUI)	13 September 1998 (aged 23)
Jonathan Caicedo (ECU)	28 April 1993 (aged 28)
Diego Camargo (COL)	3 May 1998 (aged 23)
Simon Carr (GBR)	29 August 1998 (aged 23)
Hugh Carthy (GBR)	9 July 1994 (aged 27)
Jefferson Alexander Cepeda (Note: Cepeda joined from Drone Hopper–Androni Giocattoli on 1 August.) (ECU)	16 June 1998 (aged 23)
Esteban Chaves (COL)	17 January 1990 (aged 31)
Magnus Cort (DEN)	16 January 1993 (aged 28)
Owain Doull (GBR)	2 May 1993 (aged 28)
Odd Christian Eiking (NOR)	28 December 1994 (aged 27)
Ruben Guerreiro (POR)	6 July 1994 (aged 27)
Ben Healy (IRL)	11 September 2000 (aged 21)
Alex Howes (Note: Howes left the team on 31 July.) (USA)	1 January 1988 (aged 34)
Jens Keukeleire (BEL)	23 November 1988 (aged 33)
Merhawi Kudus (ERI)	23 January 1994 (aged 27)

Rider	Date of birth
Sebastian Langeveld (NED)	17 January 1985 (aged 36)
Lachlan Morton (Note: Morton left the team on 31 July.) (AUS)	2 January 1992 (aged 29)
Hideto Nakane (JPN)	2 May 1990 (aged 31)
Mark Padun (UKR)	6 July 1996 (aged 25)
Andrea Piccolo (Note: Piccolo joined from Drone Hopper–Androni Giocattoli on 1 August.) (ITA)	23 March 2001 (aged 20)
Neilson Powless (USA)	3 September 1996 (aged 25)
Sean Quinn (USA)	10 May 2000 (aged 21)
Jonas Rutsch (GER)	24 January 1998 (aged 23)
Tom Scully (NZL)	14 January 1990 (aged 31)
James Shaw (GBR)	13 June 1996 (aged 25)
Georg Steinhauser (GER)	21 October 2001 (aged 20)
Rigoberto Urán (COL)	26 January 1987 (aged 34)
Michael Valgren (DEN)	7 February 1992 (aged 29)
Julius van den Berg (NED)	23 October 1996 (aged 25)
Marijn van den Berg (NED)	19 July 1999 (aged 22)
Łukasz Wiśniowski (POL)	7 December 1991 (aged 30)

=== Groupama–FDJ ===
As of 23 January 2022.

Rider	Date of birth
Bruno Armirail (FRA)	11 April 1994 (aged 27)
Lewis Askey (GBR)	4 May 2001 (aged 20)
Matteo Badilatti (SUI)	30 July 1992 (aged 29)
Clément Davy (FRA)	17 July 1998 (aged 23)
Arnaud Démare (FRA)	26 August 1991 (aged 30)
Antoine Duchesne (CAN)	12 September 1991 (aged 30)
David Gaudu (FRA)	10 October 1996 (aged 25)
Kévin Geniets (LUX)	9 January 1997 (aged 24)
Jacopo Guarnieri (ITA)	14 August 1987 (aged 34)
Ignatas Konovalovas (LIT)	8 December 1985 (aged 36)
Stefan Küng (SUI)	16 November 1993 (aged 28)
Mathieu Ladagnous (FRA)	12 December 1984 (aged 37)
Olivier Le Gac (FRA)	27 August 1993 (aged 28)
Fabian Lienhard (SUI)	3 September 1993 (aged 28)
Tobias Ludvigsson (SWE)	22 February 1991 (aged 30)

Rider	Date of birth
Valentin Madouas (FRA)	12 July 1996 (aged 25)
Rudy Molard (FRA)	17 September 1989 (aged 32)
Quentin Pacher (FRA)	6 January 1992 (aged 29)
Paul Penhoët (Note: Penhoët joined from Équipe Continentale Groupama–FDJ on 1 August.) (FRA)	28 December 2001 (aged 20)
Thibaut Pinot (FRA)	29 May 1990 (aged 31)
Sébastien Reichenbach (SUI)	28 May 1989 (aged 32)
Anthony Roux (FRA)	18 April 1987 (aged 34)
Miles Scotson (AUS)	18 January 1994 (aged 27)
Ramon Sinkeldam (NED)	9 February 1989 (aged 32)
Jake Stewart (GBR)	2 October 1999 (aged 22)
Michael Storer (AUS)	28 February 1997 (aged 24)
Attila Valter (HUN)	12 June 1998 (aged 23)
Lars van den Berg (NED)	7 July 1998 (aged 23)
Bram Welten (NED)	29 March 1997 (aged 24)

=== Ineos Grenadiers ===
As of 3 January 2022.

Rider	Date of birth
Andrey Amador (CRC)	29 August 1986 (aged 35)
Egan Bernal (COL)	13 January 1997 (aged 24)
Richard Carapaz (ECU)	29 May 1993 (aged 28)
Jonathan Castroviejo (ESP)	27 April 1987 (aged 34)
Laurens De Plus (BEL)	4 September 1995 (aged 26)
Eddie Dunbar (IRL)	1 September 1996 (aged 25)
Omar Fraile (ESP)	17 July 1990 (aged 31)
Filippo Ganna (ITA)	25 July 1996 (aged 25)
Tao Geoghegan Hart (GBR)	30 March 1995 (aged 26)
Ethan Hayter (GBR)	18 September 1998 (aged 23)
Kim Heiduk (GER)	3 March 2000 (aged 21)
Michał Kwiatkowski (POL)	2 June 1990 (aged 31)
Daniel Martínez (COL)	25 April 1996 (aged 25)
Jhonatan Narváez (ECU)	4 March 1997 (aged 24)
Tom Pidcock (GBR)	30 July 1999 (aged 22)
Luke Plapp (AUS)	25 December 2000 (aged 21)

Rider	Date of birth
Richie Porte (AUS)	30 January 1985 (aged 36)
Salvatore Puccio (ITA)	31 August 1989 (aged 32)
Brandon Rivera (COL)	21 March 1996 (aged 25)
Carlos Rodriguez (ESP)	2 February 2001 (aged 20)
Luke Rowe (GBR)	10 March 1990 (aged 31)
Magnus Sheffield (USA)	19 April 2002 (aged 19)
Pavel Sivakov (FRA)	11 July 1997 (aged 24)
Ben Swift (GBR)	5 November 1987 (aged 34)
Geraint Thomas (GBR)	25 May 1986 (aged 35)
Ben Tulett (GBR)	26 August 2001 (aged 20)
Ben Turner (GBR)	28 May 1999 (aged 22)
Dylan van Baarle (NED)	21 May 1992 (aged 29)
Elia Viviani (ITA)	7 February 1989 (aged 32)
Cameron Wurf (AUS)	3 August 1983 (aged 38)
Adam Yates (GBR)	7 August 1992 (aged 29)

== See also ==
- 2022 in men's road cycling
- List of 2022 UCI ProTeams and Continental teams

== Notes ==
Preceded by 2021	List of UCI WorldTeams; 2022	Succeeded by 2023
