= List of 2021 UCI WorldTeams and riders =

This page is a list of 2021 UCI WorldTeams. These 19 teams are competing in the 2021 UCI World Tour.

== Teams overview ==
2021 UCI World Teams
Code	Official Team Name	Country	Continent	Groupset	Bike Manufacturer	Road Bike(s)	Time Trial Bike	Wheels
ACT	AG2R Citroën Team	France	Europe	Campagnolo	BMC	Teammachine SLR01; Timemachine Road	Timemachine	Campagnolo
APT	Astana–Premier Tech	Kazakhstan	Asia	Shimano	Wilier	Filante SLR; 0 SLR	Turbine	Corima
BOH	Bora–Hansgrohe	Germany	Europe	Shimano	Specialized	S-Works Tarmac SL7; S-Works Roubaix	S-Works SHIV TT DISC	Roval
COF	Cofidis	France	Europe	Campagnolo	De Rosa	SK Pininfarina; Merak	TT-03	Fulcrum
DQT	Deceuninck–Quick-Step	Belgium	Europe	Shimano	Specialized	S-Works Tarmac SL7; S-Works Roubaix	S-Works SHIV TT DISC	Roval
EFN	EF Education–Nippo	United States	America	Shimano	Cannondale	System Six; Super Six Evo	Slice	Vision
GFC	Groupama–FDJ	France	Europe	Shimano	Lapierre	Aircode DRS; Xelius SL	Aerostorm	Shimano
IGD	Ineos Grenadiers	Great Britain	Europe	Shimano	Pinarello	Dogma F12; Dogma F	Bolide TT	Shimano
IWG	Intermarché–Wanty–Gobert Matériaux	Belgium	Europe	Shimano	Cube	Litening C:68X	AERIUM TT	Newmen
ISN	Israel Start-Up Nation	Israel	Asia	Shimano	Factor	Ostro VAM; ONE Disc; 02 VAM	SLiCK Disc	Black Inc
LTS	Lotto–Soudal	Belgium	Europe	Campagnolo	Ridley	Noah Fast Disc; Helium SLX Disc	Dean Fast	Campagnolo
MOV	Movistar Team	Spain	Europe	SRAM	Canyon	Ultimate CF SLX Team MOV; Aeroad CF Team MOV	Speedmax CF Team MOV	Zipp
TBV	Team Bahrain Victorious	Bahrain	Asia	Shimano	Merida	Reacto; Scultura	Warp TT	Vision
BEX	Team BikeExchange	Australia	Oceania	Shimano	Bianchi	Specialissima disc Oltre XR4 disc	Aquila	Shimano
DSM	Team DSM	Germany	Europe	Shimano	Scott	Addict RC; Foil	Plasma	Shimano
TJV	Team Jumbo–Visma	Netherlands	Europe	Shimano	Cervélo	S5; R5; Caledonia	P5	Shimano
TQA	Team Qhubeka NextHash	South Africa	Africa	Shimano	BMC	Timemachine Road; Teammachine	Timemachine	Hunt
TFS	Trek–Segafredo	United States	America	Sram	Trek	Madone Disc; Emonda Disc; Domane Disc	Speed Concept	Bontrager
UAD	UAE Team Emirates	United Arab Emirates	Asia	Campagnolo	Colnago	Concept; C64; V3Rs	Kone	Campagnolo

== Riders ==
=== AG2R Citroën Team ===
As of 1 August 2021.

Rider	Date of birth
Clément Berthet (Note: Berthet joined from Delko on 1 August.) (FRA)	2 August 1997 (aged 23)
François Bidard (FRA)	12 March 1992 (aged 28)
Geoffrey Bouchard (FRA)	1 April 1992 (aged 28)
Lilian Calmejane (FRA)	6 December 1992 (aged 28)
Clément Champoussin (FRA)	29 May 1998 (aged 22)
Mikaël Cherel (FRA)	17 March 1986 (aged 34)
Benoît Cosnefroy (FRA)	17 October 1995 (aged 25)
Stan Dewulf (BEL)	20 December 1997 (aged 23)
Julien Duval (FRA)	27 May 1990 (aged 30)
Mathias Frank (SUI)	9 December 1986 (aged 34)
Tony Gallopin (FRA)	24 May 1988 (aged 32)
Ben Gastauer (LUX)	14 November 1987 (aged 33)
Dorian Godon (FRA)	25 May 1996 (aged 24)
Alexis Gougeard (FRA)	5 March 1993 (aged 27)
Jaakko Hänninen (FIN)	16 April 1997 (aged 23)
Anthony Jullien (FRA)	5 March 1998 (aged 22)

Rider	Date of birth
Bob Jungels (LUX)	22 September 1992 (aged 28)
Lawrence Naesen (BEL)	28 August 1992 (aged 28)
Oliver Naesen (BEL)	16 September 1990 (aged 30)
Ben O'Connor (AUS)	25 November 1995 (aged 25)
Aurélien Paret-Peintre (FRA)	27 February 1996 (aged 24)
Nans Peters (FRA)	12 March 1994 (aged 26)
Nicolas Prodhomme (FRA)	1 February 1997 (aged 23)
Marc Sarreau (FRA)	10 June 1993 (aged 27)
Michael Schär (SUI)	29 September 1986 (aged 34)
Damien Touzé (FRA)	7 July 1996 (aged 24)
Greg Van Avermaet (BEL)	17 May 1985 (aged 35)
Gijs Van Hoecke (BEL)	12 November 1991 (aged 29)
Andrea Vendrame (ITA)	20 July 1994 (aged 26)
Clément Venturini (FRA)	16 October 1993 (aged 27)
Larry Warbasse (USA)	28 January 1990 (aged 30)

=== Astana–Premier Tech ===
As of 10 June 2021.

Rider	Date of birth
Alex Aranburu (ESP)	19 September 1995 (aged 25)
Samuele Battistella (ITA)	14 November 1998 (aged 22)
Manuele Boaro (ITA)	12 March 1987 (aged 33)
Gleb Brussenskiy (KAZ)	18 April 2000 (aged 20)
Rodrigo Contreras (COL)	2 June 1994 (aged 26)
Stefan de Bod (RSA)	17 November 1996 (aged 24)
Yevgeniy Fedorov (KAZ)	16 February 2000 (aged 20)
Fabio Felline (ITA)	29 March 1990 (aged 30)
Omar Fraile (ESP)	17 July 1990 (aged 30)
Jakob Fuglsang (DEN)	22 March 1985 (aged 35)
Yevgeniy Gidich (KAZ)	19 May 1996 (aged 24)
Jonas Gregaard (DEN)	30 July 1996 (aged 24)
Dmitriy Gruzdev (KAZ)	13 March 1986 (aged 34)
Hugo Houle (CAN)	27 September 1990 (aged 30)
Ion Izagirre (ESP)	4 February 1989 (aged 31)
Gorka Izagirre (ESP)	7 October 1987 (aged 33)

Rider	Date of birth
Merhawi Kudus (ERI)	23 January 1994 (aged 26)
Alexey Lutsenko (KAZ)	7 September 1992 (aged 28)
Davide Martinelli (ITA)	31 May 1993 (aged 27)
Yuriy Natarov (KAZ)	28 December 1996 (aged 24)
Ben Perry (CAN)	7 March 1994 (aged 26)
Andrea Piccolo (ITA)	23 March 2001 (aged 19)
Vadim Pronskiy (KAZ)	4 June 1998 (aged 22)
Óscar Rodríguez (ESP)	6 May 1995 (aged 25)
Javier Romo (ESP)	6 January 1999 (aged 21)
Luis León Sánchez (ESP)	24 November 1983 (aged 37)
Matteo Sobrero (ITA)	14 May 1997 (aged 23)
Nikita Stalnov (KAZ)	14 September 1991 (aged 29)
Harold Tejada (COL)	27 April 1997 (aged 23)
Aleksandr Vlasov (RUS)	23 April 1996 (aged 24)
Artyom Zakharov (KAZ)	27 October 1991 (aged 29)

=== Bora–Hansgrohe ===
As of 10 June 2021.

Rider	Date of birth
Pascal Ackermann (GER)	17 January 1994 (aged 26)
Giovanni Aleotti (ITA)	25 May 1999 (aged 21)
Erik Baška (SVK)	12 January 1994 (aged 26)
Cesare Benedetti (ITA)	3 August 1987 (aged 33)
Maciej Bodnar (POL)	7 March 1985 (aged 35)
Emanuel Buchmann (GER)	18 November 1992 (aged 28)
Marcus Burghardt (GER)	30 June 1983 (aged 37)
Matteo Fabbro (ITA)	10 April 1995 (aged 25)
Patrick Gamper (AUT)	18 February 1997 (aged 23)
Felix Großschartner (AUT)	23 December 1993 (aged 27)
Lennard Kämna (GER)	9 September 1996 (aged 24)
Wilco Kelderman (NED)	25 March 1991 (aged 29)
Patrick Konrad (AUT)	13 October 1991 (aged 29)
Martin Laas (EST)	15 September 1993 (aged 27)
Jordi Meeus (BEL)	1 July 1998 (aged 22)

Rider	Date of birth
Daniel Oss (ITA)	13 January 1987 (aged 33)
Anton Palzer (Note: Palzer officially joined the team on 1 April, after the conclusion of the ski mountaineering season.) (GER)	11 March 1993 (aged 27)
Nils Politt (GER)	6 March 1994 (aged 26)
Lukas Pöstlberger (AUT)	10 January 1992 (aged 28)
Juraj Sagan (SVK)	23 December 1988 (aged 32)
Peter Sagan (SVK)	26 January 1990 (aged 30)
Maximilian Schachmann (GER)	9 January 1994 (aged 26)
Ide Schelling (NED)	6 February 1998 (aged 22)
Andreas Schillinger (GER)	13 July 1983 (aged 37)
Michael Schwarzmann (GER)	7 January 1991 (aged 29)
Rüdiger Selig (GER)	19 February 1989 (aged 31)
Matthew Walls (GBR)	20 April 1998 (aged 22)
Frederik Wandahl (DEN)	9 May 2001 (aged 19)
Ben Zwiehoff (GER)	22 February 1994 (aged 26)

=== Cofidis ===
As of 10 June 2021.

Rider	Date of birth
Piet Allegaert (BEL)	20 January 1995 (aged 25)
Fernando Barceló (ESP)	6 January 1996 (aged 24)
Natnael Berhane (ERI)	5 January 1991 (aged 29)
Tom Bohli (SUI)	17 January 1994 (aged 26)
André Carvalho (POR)	31 October 1997 (aged 23)
Thomas Champion (FRA)	8 September 1999 (aged 21)
Simone Consonni (ITA)	12 September 1994 (aged 26)
Jempy Drucker (LUX)	3 September 1986 (aged 34)
Nicolas Edet (FRA)	2 November 1987 (aged 33)
Rubén Fernández (ESP)	1 March 1991 (aged 29)
Eddy Finé (FRA)	20 November 1997 (aged 23)
Simon Geschke (GER)	13 March 1986 (aged 34)
Nathan Haas (AUS)	12 May 1989 (aged 31)
Jesús Herrada (ESP)	26 July 1990 (aged 30)

Rider	Date of birth
José Herrada (ESP)	1 October 1985 (aged 35)
Victor Lafay (FRA)	17 January 1996 (aged 24)
Christophe Laporte (FRA)	11 December 1992 (aged 28)
Guillaume Martin (FRA)	9 June 1993 (aged 27)
Emmanuel Morin (FRA)	13 March 1995 (aged 25)
Anthony Perez (FRA)	22 April 1991 (aged 29)
Pierre-Luc Périchon (FRA)	4 January 1987 (aged 33)
Rémy Rochas (FRA)	18 May 1996 (aged 24)
Fabio Sabatini (ITA)	8 February 1985 (aged 35)
Szymon Sajnok (POL)	24 August 1997 (aged 23)
Kenneth Vanbilsen (BEL)	1 June 1990 (aged 30)
Attilio Viviani (ITA)	18 October 1996 (aged 24)
Elia Viviani (ITA)	7 February 1989 (aged 31)
Jelle Wallays (BEL)	11 May 1989 (aged 30)

=== Deceuninck–Quick-Step ===
As of 10 June 2021.

Rider	Date of birth
Julian Alaphilippe (FRA)	11 June 1992 (aged 28)
João Almeida (POR)	5 August 1998 (aged 22)
Shane Archbold (NZL)	2 February 1989 (aged 31)
Kasper Asgreen (DEN)	8 February 1995 (aged 25)
Andrea Bagioli (ITA)	23 March 1999 (aged 21)
Davide Ballerini (ITA)	21 September 1994 (aged 26)
Sam Bennett (IRL)	16 October 1990 (aged 30)
Mattia Cattaneo (ITA)	25 October 1990 (aged 30)
Rémi Cavagna (FRA)	10 August 1995 (aged 25)
Mark Cavendish (GBR)	21 May 1985 (aged 35)
Josef Černý (CZE)	11 May 1993 (aged 27)
Tim Declercq (BEL)	21 March 1989 (aged 31)
Dries Devenyns (BEL)	22 July 1983 (aged 37)
Remco Evenepoel (BEL)	25 January 2000 (aged 20)
Mikkel Frølich Honoré (DEN)	21 January 1997 (aged 23)

Rider	Date of birth
Ian Garrison (USA)	14 April 1998 (aged 22)
Álvaro Hodeg (COL)	16 September 1996 (aged 24)
Fabio Jakobsen (NED)	31 August 1996 (aged 24)
Iljo Keisse (BEL)	21 December 1982 (aged 38)
James Knox (GBR)	4 November 1995 (aged 25)
Yves Lampaert (BEL)	10 April 1991 (aged 29)
Fausto Masnada (ITA)	6 November 1993 (aged 27)
Michael Mørkøv (DEN)	30 April 1985 (aged 35)
Florian Sénéchal (FRA)	10 July 1993 (aged 27)
Pieter Serry (BEL)	21 November 1988 (aged 32)
Stijn Steels (BEL)	21 August 1989 (aged 31)
Jannik Steimle (GER)	4 April 1996 (aged 24)
Zdeněk Štybar (CZE)	11 December 1985 (aged 35)
Bert Van Lerberghe (BEL)	29 September 1992 (aged 28)
Mauri Vansevenant (BEL)	1 June 1999 (aged 21)

=== EF Education–Nippo ===
As of 15 June 2021.

Rider	Date of birth
Daniel Arroyave (COL)	June 19, 2000 (aged 20)
Will Barta (USA)	January 4, 1996 (aged 24)
Fumiyuki Beppu (JPN)	April 10, 1983 (aged 37)
Alberto Bettiol (ITA)	October 29, 1993 (aged 27)
Stefan Bissegger (SUI)	September 13, 1998 (aged 22)
Jonathan Caicedo (ECU)	April 28, 1993 (aged 27)
Diego Camargo (COL)	May 3, 1998 (aged 22)
Simon Carr (GBR)	August 29, 1998 (aged 22)
Hugh Carthy (GBR)	July 9, 1994 (aged 26)
Magnus Cort (DEN)	January 16, 1993 (aged 27)
Lawson Craddock (USA)	February 20, 1992 (aged 28)
Mitchell Docker (AUS)	October 2, 1986 (aged 34)
Julien El Fares (FRA)	June 1, 1985 (aged 35)
Ruben Guerreiro (POR)	July 6, 1994 (aged 26)
Sergio Higuita (COL)	August 1, 1997 (aged 23)

Rider	Date of birth
Moreno Hofland (NED)	August 31, 1991 (aged 29)
Alex Howes (USA)	January 1, 1988 (aged 33)
Jens Keukeleire (BEL)	November 23, 1988 (aged 32)
Sebastian Langeveld (NED)	January 17, 1985 (aged 35)
Lachlan Morton (AUS)	January 2, 1992 (aged 28)
Hideto Nakane (JPN)	May 2, 1990 (aged 30)
Logan Owen (USA)	March 23, 1995 (aged 25)
Neilson Powless (USA)	September 3, 1996 (aged 24)
Jonas Rutsch (GER)	January 24, 1998 (aged 22)
Tom Scully (NZL)	January 14, 1990 (aged 30)
Rigoberto Urán (COL)	January 26, 1987 (aged 33)
Michael Valgren (DEN)	February 7, 1992 (aged 28)
Julius van den Berg (NED)	October 23, 1996 (aged 24)
Tejay van Garderen (Note: Tejay van Garderen retired after the United States National Road Race Championships on 20 June.) (USA)	August 12, 1988 (aged 32)
James Whelan (AUS)	July 11, 1996 (aged 24)

=== Groupama–FDJ ===
As of 10 June 2021.

Rider	Date of birth
Bruno Armirail (FRA)	11 April 1994 (aged 26)
Matteo Badilatti (SUI)	30 July 1992 (aged 28)
William Bonnet (FRA)	25 June 1982 (aged 38)
Alexys Brunel (FRA)	10 October 1998 (aged 22)
Clément Davy (FRA)	17 July 1998 (aged 22)
Mickaël Delage (FRA)	6 August 1985 (aged 35)
Arnaud Démare (FRA)	26 August 1991 (aged 29)
Antoine Duchesne (CAN)	12 September 1991 (aged 29)
David Gaudu (FRA)	10 October 1996 (aged 24)
Kévin Geniets (LUX)	9 January 1997 (aged 23)
Jacopo Guarnieri (ITA)	14 August 1987 (aged 33)
Simon Guglielmi (FRA)	1 July 1997 (aged 23)
Ignatas Konovalovas (LIT)	8 December 1985 (aged 35)
Stefan Küng (SUI)	16 November 1993 (aged 27)
Mathieu Ladagnous (FRA)	12 December 1984 (aged 36)

Rider	Date of birth
Olivier Le Gac (FRA)	27 August 1993 (aged 27)
Fabian Lienhard (SUI)	3 September 1993 (aged 27)
Tobias Ludvigsson (SWE)	22 February 1991 (aged 29)
Valentin Madouas (FRA)	12 July 1996 (aged 24)
Rudy Molard (FRA)	17 September 1989 (aged 31)
Thibaut Pinot (FRA)	29 May 1990 (aged 30)
Sébastien Reichenbach (SUI)	28 May 1989 (aged 31)
Anthony Roux (FRA)	18 April 1987 (aged 33)
Miles Scotson (AUS)	18 January 1994 (aged 26)
Romain Seigle (FRA)	11 October 1994 (aged 26)
Ramon Sinkeldam (NED)	9 February 1989 (aged 31)
Jake Stewart (GBR)	2 October 1999 (aged 21)
Benjamin Thomas (FRA)	12 September 1995 (aged 25)
Attila Valter (HUN)	June 12, 1998 (aged 22)
Lars van den Berg (NED)	July 7, 1998 (aged 22)

=== Ineos Grenadiers ===
As of 10 June 2021.

Rider	Date of birth
Andrey Amador (CRC)	29 August 1986 (aged 34)
Leonardo Basso (ITA)	25 December 1993 (aged 27)
Egan Bernal (COL)	13 January 1997 (aged 23)
Richard Carapaz (ECU)	29 May 1993 (aged 27)
Jonathan Castroviejo (ESP)	27 April 1987 (aged 33)
Laurens De Plus (BEL)	4 September 1995 (aged 25)
Rohan Dennis (AUS)	28 May 1990 (aged 30)
Owain Doull (GBR)	2 May 1993 (aged 27)
Eddie Dunbar (IRL)	1 September 1996 (aged 24)
Filippo Ganna (ITA)	25 July 1996 (aged 24)
Tao Geoghegan Hart (GBR)	30 March 1995 (aged 25)
Michał Gołaś (POL)	29 April 1984 (aged 36)
Ethan Hayter (GBR)	18 September 1998 (aged 22)
Sebastián Henao (COL)	5 August 1993 (aged 27)
Michał Kwiatkowski (POL)	2 June 1990 (aged 30)
Daniel Martínez (COL)	April 25, 1996 (aged 24)

Rider	Date of birth
Gianni Moscon (ITA)	20 April 1994 (aged 26)
Jhonatan Narváez (ECU)	4 March 1997 (aged 23)
Tom Pidcock (GBR)	30 July 1999 (aged 21)
Richie Porte (AUS)	30 January 1985 (aged 35)
Salvatore Puccio (ITA)	31 August 1989 (aged 31)
Brandon Rivera (COL)	21 March 1996 (aged 24)
Carlos Rodriguez (ESP)	2 February 2001 (aged 19)
Luke Rowe (GBR)	10 March 1990 (aged 30)
Pavel Sivakov (RUS)	11 July 1997 (aged 23)
Iván Sosa (COL)	31 October 1997 (aged 23)
Ben Swift (GBR)	5 November 1987 (aged 33)
Geraint Thomas (GBR)	25 May 1986 (aged 34)
Dylan van Baarle (NED)	21 May 1992 (aged 28)
Cameron Wurf (AUS)	3 August 1983 (aged 37)
Adam Yates (GBR)	7 August 1992 (aged 28)

=== Intermarché–Wanty–Gobert Matériaux ===
As of 6 August 2021.

Rider	Date of birth
Jan Bakelants (BEL)	14 February 1986 (aged 34)
Jérémy Bellicaud (FRA)	8 June 1998 (aged 22)
Aimé De Gendt (BEL)	17 June 1994 (aged 26)
Jasper De Plus (BEL)	11 June 1997 (aged 23)
Ludwig De Winter (BEL)	31 December 1992 (aged 28)
Théo Delacroix (FRA)	21 February 1999 (aged 21)
Tom Devriendt (BEL)	29 October 1991 (aged 29)
Odd Christian Eiking (NOR)	28 December 1994 (aged 26)
Alex Evans (AUS)	28 January 1997 (aged 23)
Biniam Girmay (Note: Girmay joined the team on 6 August, after having previously raced for Delko earlier in the year.) (ERI)	2 April 2000 (aged 20)
Quinten Hermans (BEL)	29 July 1995 (aged 25)
Jan Hirt (CZE)	21 January 1991 (aged 29)
Jonas Koch (GER)	25 June 1993 (aged 27)
Wesley Kreder (NED)	4 November 1990 (aged 30)
Maurits Lammertink (NED)	31 August 1990 (aged 30)

Rider	Date of birth
Louis Meintjes (RSA)	21 February 1992 (aged 28)
Riccardo Minali (ITA)	19 April 1995 (aged 25)
Andrea Pasqualon (ITA)	2 January 1988 (aged 32)
Simone Petilli (ITA)	4 May 1993 (aged 27)
Baptiste Planckaert (BEL)	28 September 1988 (aged 32)
Lorenzo Rota (ITA)	23 May 1995 (aged 25)
Rein Taaramäe (EST)	24 April 1987 (aged 33)
Taco van der Hoorn (NED)	4 December 1993 (aged 26)
Corné van Kessel (NED)	7 August 1991 (aged 29)
Kevin Van Melsen (BEL)	1 April 1987 (aged 33)
Boy van Poppel (NED)	18 January 1988 (aged 32)
Danny van Poppel (NED)	26 July 1993 (aged 27)
Pieter Vanspeybrouck (BEL)	10 February 1987 (aged 33)
Loïc Vliegen (BEL)	20 December 1993 (aged 27)
Georg Zimmermann (GER)	11 October 1997 (aged 23)

=== Israel Start-Up Nation ===
As of 10 June 2021.

Rider	Date of birth
Rudy Barbier (FRA)	18 December 1992 (aged 28)
Sebastian Berwick (AUS)	15 December 1999 (aged 21)
Patrick Bevin (NZL)	15 February 1991 (aged 29)
Jenthe Biermans (BEL)	30 October 1995 (aged 25)
Guillaume Boivin (CAN)	25 May 1989 (aged 31)
Matthias Brändle (AUT)	7 December 1989 (aged 31)
Alexander Cataford (CAN)	1 September 1993 (aged 27)
Davide Cimolai (ITA)	13 August 1989 (aged 31)
Alessandro De Marchi (ITA)	19 May 1986 (aged 34)
Alex Dowsett (GBR)	3 October 1988 (aged 32)
Itamar Einhorn (ISR)	20 September 1997 (aged 23)
Chris Froome (GBR)	20 May 1985 (aged 35)
Omer Goldstein (ISR)	13 August 1996 (aged 24)
André Greipel (GER)	16 July 1982 (aged 38)
Carl Fredrik Hagen (NOR)	26 September 1991 (aged 29)
Ben Hermans (BEL)	8 June 1986 (aged 34)

Rider	Date of birth
Hugo Hofstetter (FRA)	13 February 1994 (aged 26)
Reto Hollenstein (SUI)	22 August 1985 (aged 35)
Daryl Impey (RSA)	6 December 1984 (aged 36)
Taj Jones (Note: Jones spent the first half of the year with the team's development squad, Israel Cycling Academy, before joining the senior team on 1 July.) (AUS)	26 July 2000 (aged 20)
Dan Martin (IRL)	20 August 1986 (aged 34)
Krists Neilands (LAT)	18 August 1994 (aged 26)
Guy Niv (ISR)	8 March 1994 (aged 26)
James Piccoli (CAN)	5 September 1991 (aged 29)
Alexis Renard (FRA)	1 June 1999 (aged 21)
Guy Sagiv (ISR)	5 December 1994 (aged 26)
Norman Vahtra (EST)	23 November 1996 (aged 24)
Tom Van Asbroeck (BEL)	19 April 1990 (aged 30)
Sep Vanmarcke (BEL)	28 July 1988 (aged 32)
Michael Woods (CAN)	12 October 1986 (aged 34)
Mads Würtz Schmidt (DEN)	31 March 1994 (aged 26)
Rick Zabel (GER)	7 December 1993 (aged 27)

=== Lotto–Soudal ===
As of 10 June 2021.

Rider	Date of birth
Filippo Conca (ITA)	22 September 1998 (aged 22)
Steff Cras (BEL)	13 February 1996 (aged 24)
Jasper De Buyst (BEL)	24 November 1993 (aged 27)
Thomas De Gendt (BEL)	6 November 1986 (aged 34)
John Degenkolb (GER)	7 January 1989 (aged 31)
Caleb Ewan (AUS)	11 July 1994 (aged 26)
Frederik Frison (BEL)	28 July 1992 (aged 28)
Philippe Gilbert (BEL)	5 July 1982 (aged 38)
Kobe Goossens (BEL)	29 April 1996 (aged 24)
Sébastien Grignard (BEL)	29 April 1999 (aged 21)
Matthew Holmes (GBR)	8 December 1993 (aged 27)
Roger Kluge (GER)	5 February 1986 (aged 34)
Andreas Kron (DEN)	1 June 1998 (aged 22)
Kamil Małecki (POL)	2 January 1996 (aged 24)

Rider	Date of birth
Tomasz Marczyński (POL)	6 March 1984 (aged 36)
Sylvain Moniquet (BEL)	14 January 1998 (aged 22)
Stefano Oldani (ITA)	10 January 1998 (aged 22)
Harry Sweeny (AUS)	9 July 1998 (aged 22)
Gerben Thijssen (BEL)	21 June 1998 (aged 22)
Tosh Van der Sande (BEL)	28 November 1990 (aged 30)
Maxim Van Gils (BEL)	25 November 1999 (aged 21)
Brent Van Moer (BEL)	12 January 1998 (aged 22)
Harm Vanhoucke (BEL)	17 June 1997 (aged 23)
Florian Vermeersch (BEL)	12 April 1999 (aged 21)
Viktor Verschaeve (BEL)	3 August 1998 (aged 22)
Xandres Vervloesem (BEL)	13 May 2000 (aged 20)
Tim Wellens (BEL)	10 May 1991 (aged 29)

=== Movistar Team ===
As of 10 June 2021.

Rider	Date of birth
Juan Diego Alba (COL)	11 September 1997 (aged 23)
Jorge Arcas (ESP)	8 July 1992 (aged 28)
Héctor Carretero (ESP)	28 May 1995 (aged 25)
Dario Cataldo (ITA)	17 March 1985 (aged 35)
Gabriel Cullaigh (GBR)	8 April 1996 (aged 24)
Iñigo Elosegui (ESP)	6 March 1998 (aged 22)
Imanol Erviti (ESP)	15 November 1983 (aged 37)
Iván García (ESP)	20 November 1995 (aged 25)
Abner González (PUR)	9 October 2000 (aged 20)
Juri Hollmann (GER)	30 August 1999 (aged 21)
Johan Jacobs (SUI)	1 March 1997 (aged 23)
Matteo Jorgenson (USA)	1 July 1999 (aged 21)
Miguel Ángel López (COL)	4 February 1994 (aged 26)
Enric Mas (ESP)	7 January 1995 (aged 25)
Lluís Mas (ESP)	15 October 1989 (aged 31)

Rider	Date of birth
Sebastián Mora (ESP)	19 February 1988 (aged 32)
Gregor Mühlberger (AUT)	4 April 1994 (aged 26)
Mathias Norsgaard (DEN)	5 May 1997 (aged 23)
Nelson Oliveira (POR)	6 March 1989 (aged 31)
Antonio Pedrero (ESP)	23 October 1991 (aged 29)
José Joaquín Rojas (ESP)	8 June 1985 (aged 35)
Einer Rubio (COL)	22 February 1998 (aged 22)
Sergio Samitier (ESP)	31 August 1995 (aged 25)
Gonzalo Serrano (ESP)	17 August 1994 (aged 26)
Marc Soler (ESP)	22 November 1993 (aged 27)
Albert Torres (ESP)	26 April 1990 (aged 30)
Alejandro Valverde (ESP)	25 April 1980 (aged 40)
Carlos Verona (ESP)	4 November 1992 (aged 28)
Davide Villella (ITA)	27 June 1991 (aged 29)

=== Team Bahrain Victorious ===
As of 10 June 2021.

Rider	Date of birth
Yukiya Arashiro (JPN)	22 September 1984 (aged 36)
Phil Bauhaus (GER)	8 July 1994 (aged 26)
Pello Bilbao (ESP)	25 February 1990 (aged 30)
Santiago Buitrago (COL)	26 September 1999 (aged 21)
Eros Capecchi (ITA)	13 June 1986 (aged 34)
Damiano Caruso (ITA)	12 October 1987 (aged 33)
Sonny Colbrelli (ITA)	17 May 1990 (aged 30)
Feng Chun-kai (TWN)	2 November 1988 (aged 32)
Scott Davies (GBR)	5 August 1995 (aged 25)
Jack Haig (AUS)	6 September 1993 (aged 27)
Marco Haller (AUT)	1 April 1991 (aged 29)
Heinrich Haussler (AUS)	25 February 1984 (aged 36)
Kevin Inkelaar (NED)	8 July 1997 (aged 23)
Mikel Landa (ESP)	13 December 1989 (aged 31)

Rider	Date of birth
Ahmed Madan (BHR)	25 August 2000 (aged 20)
Gino Mäder (SUI)	4 January 1997 (aged 23)
Jonathan Milan (ITA)	1 October 2000 (aged 20)
Matej Mohorič (SLO)	19 October 1994 (aged 26)
Domen Novak (SLO)	12 July 1995 (aged 25)
Mark Padun (UKR)	6 July 1996 (aged 24)
Hermann Pernsteiner (AUT)	7 August 1990 (aged 30)
Wout Poels (NED)	1 October 1987 (aged 33)
Marcel Sieberg (GER)	30 April 1982 (aged 38)
Dylan Teuns (BEL)	1 March 1992 (aged 28)
Jan Tratnik (SLO)	23 February 1990 (aged 30)
Rafael Valls (ESP)	25 June 1987 (aged 33)
Stephen Williams (GBR)	9 June 1996 (aged 24)
Alfred Wright (GBR)	13 June 1999 (aged 21)

=== Team BikeExchange ===
As of 10 June 2021.

Rider	Date of birth
Jack Bauer (NZL)	7 April 1985 (aged 35)
Sam Bewley (NZL)	22 July 1987 (aged 33)
Brent Bookwalter (USA)	16 February 1984 (aged 36)
Kevin Colleoni (ITA)	11 November 1999 (aged 21)
Esteban Chaves (COL)	17 January 1990 (aged 30)
Luke Durbridge (AUS)	9 April 1991 (aged 29)
Alex Edmondson (AUS)	22 December 1993 (aged 27)
Tsgabu Grmay (ETH)	25 August 1991 (aged 29)
Kaden Groves (AUS)	23 December 1998 (aged 22)
Lucas Hamilton (AUS)	12 February 1996 (aged 24)
Michael Hepburn (AUS)	17 August 1991 (aged 29)
Damien Howson (AUS)	13 August 1992 (aged 28)
Amund Grøndahl Jansen (NOR)	11 February 1994 (aged 26)
Christopher Juul-Jensen (DEN)	6 July 1989 (aged 31)

Rider	Date of birth
Tanel Kangert (EST)	11 March 1987 (aged 33)
Alexander Konychev (ITA)	25 July 1998 (aged 22)
Michael Matthews (AUS)	26 September 1990 (aged 30)
Cameron Meyer (AUS)	11 January 1988 (aged 32)
Luka Mezgec (SLO)	27 June 1988 (aged 32)
Mikel Nieve (ESP)	26 May 1984 (aged 36)
Barnabás Peák (HUN)	29 November 1998 (aged 22)
Nick Schultz (AUS)	13 September 1994 (aged 26)
Callum Scotson (AUS)	10 August 1996 (aged 24)
Dion Smith (NZL)	3 March 1993 (aged 27)
Robert Stannard (AUS)	16 September 1998 (aged 22)
Simon Yates (GBR)	7 August 1992 (aged 28)
Andrey Zeits (KAZ)	14 December 1986 (aged 34)

=== Team DSM ===
As of 10 June 2021.

Rider	Date of birth
Thymen Arensman (GER)	4 December 1999 (aged 21)
Nikias Arndt (GER)	18 November 1991 (aged 29)
Romain Bardet (FRA)	9 November 1990 (aged 30)
Tiesj Benoot (BEL)	11 March 1994 (aged 26)
Cees Bol (NED)	27 July 1995 (aged 25)
Marco Brenner (GER)	27 August 2002 (aged 18)
Romain Combaud (FRA)	1 April 1991 (aged 29)
Alberto Dainese (ITA)	25 March 1998 (aged 22)
Nico Denz (GER)	15 February 1994 (aged 26)
Mark Donovan (GBR)	3 April 1999 (aged 21)
Nils Eekhoff (NED)	23 January 1998 (aged 22)
Felix Gall (AUT)	27 February 1998 (aged 22)
Chad Haga (USA)	26 August 1988 (aged 32)
Chris Hamilton (AUS)	18 May 1995 (aged 25)
Jai Hindley (AUS)	5 May 1996 (aged 24)
Marc Hirschi (Note: Hirschi's contract, which originally was set to expire at the end of the 2021 season, was terminated with immediate effect on 5 January. He subsequently joined UAE Team Emirates.) (SUI)	24 August 1998 (aged 22)

Rider	Date of birth
Max Kanter (GER)	22 October 1997 (aged 23)
Asbjørn Kragh Andersen (DEN)	9 April 1992 (aged 28)
Søren Kragh Andersen (DEN)	10 August 1994 (aged 26)
Andreas Leknessund (NOR)	21 May 1999 (aged 21)
Niklas Märkl (GER)	3 March 1999 (aged 21)
Joris Nieuwenhuis (NED)	11 February 1996 (aged 24)
Casper Pedersen (DEN)	15 March 1996 (aged 24)
Nicolas Roche (IRL)	3 July 1984 (aged 36)
Martin Salmon (GER)	29 October 1997 (aged 23)
Michael Storer (AUS)	28 February 1997 (aged 23)
Florian Stork (GER)	27 April 1997 (aged 23)
Jasha Sütterlin (GER)	4 November 1992 (aged 28)
Martijn Tusveld (NED)	9 September 1993 (aged 27)
Ilan Van Wilder (BEL)	14 May 2000 (aged 20)
Kevin Vermaerke (USA)	16 October 2000 (aged 20)

=== Team Jumbo–Visma ===
As of 10 June 2021.

Rider	Date of birth
Edoardo Affini (ITA)	24 June 1996 (aged 24)
George Bennett (NZL)	7 April 1990 (aged 30)
Koen Bouwman (NED)	2 December 1993 (aged 27)
David Dekker (NED)	2 February 1998 (aged 22)
Tom Dumoulin (Note: On 23 January, Dumoulin decided to take an indefinite break from cycling and left the team's training camp. On 6 June, he made his return to racing at the Tour de Suisse.) (NED)	11 November 1990 (aged 30)
Pascal Eenkhoorn (NED)	8 February 1997 (aged 23)
Tobias Foss (NOR)	25 May 1997 (aged 23)
Robert Gesink (NED)	31 May 1986 (aged 34)
Dylan Groenewegen (NED)	21 June 1993 (aged 27)
Chris Harper (AUS)	23 November 1994 (aged 26)
Lennard Hofstede (NED)	29 December 1994 (aged 26)
Olav Kooij (NED)	17 October 2001 (aged 19)
Steven Kruijswijk (NED)	7 June 1987 (aged 33)
Sepp Kuss (USA)	13 September 1994 (aged 26)

Rider	Date of birth
Gijs Leemreize (NED)	23 October 1999 (aged 21)
Paul Martens (Note: Martens retired on 30 June.) (GER)	26 October 1983 (aged 37)
Tony Martin (GER)	23 April 1985 (aged 35)
Sam Oomen (NED)	15 August 1995 (aged 25)
Christoph Pfingsten (GER)	20 November 1987 (aged 33)
Primož Roglič (SLO)	29 October 1989 (aged 31)
Timo Roosen (NED)	11 January 1993 (aged 27)
Mike Teunissen (NED)	25 August 1992 (aged 28)
Antwan Tolhoek (NED)	29 April 1994 (aged 26)
Wout van Aert (BEL)	15 September 1994 (aged 26)
Jos van Emden (NED)	27 June 1985 (aged 35)
Nathan Van Hooydonck (BEL)	October 12, 1995 (aged 25)
Jonas Vingegaard (DEN)	10 December 1996 (aged 24)
Maarten Wynants (Note: Wynants originally wished to retire after Paris–Roubaix, which was originally scheduled for 11 April. However, when the race was postponed to 3 October, Wynants decided to retire after the Tour of Flanders on 4 April, at which point he transitioned into a sports director role for the team.) (BEL)	13 May 1982 (aged 38)

=== Team Qhubeka NextHash ===
As of 10 June 2021.

Rider	Date of birth
Sander Armée (BEL)	10 December 1985 (aged 35)
Fabio Aru (ITA)	3 July 1990 (aged 30)
Carlos Barbero (ESP)	29 April 1991 (aged 29)
Sean Bennett (USA)	March 31, 1996 (aged 24)
Connor Brown (NZL)	6 August 1998 (aged 22)
Victor Campenaerts (BEL)	28 October 1991 (aged 29)
Dimitri Claeys (BEL)	18 June 1987 (aged 33)
Simon Clarke (AUS)	18 July 1986 (aged 34)
Nicholas Dlamini (RSA)	12 August 1995 (aged 25)
Kilian Frankiny (SUI)	26 January 1994 (aged 26)
Michael Gogl (AUT)	4 November 1993 (aged 27)
Lasse Norman Hansen (DEN)	11 February 1992 (aged 28)
Sergio Henao (COL)	10 December 1987 (aged 33)
Reinardt Janse van Rensburg (RSA)	3 February 1989 (aged 31)

Rider	Date of birth
Bert-Jan Lindeman (NED)	16 June 1989 (aged 31)
Giacomo Nizzolo (ITA)	30 January 1989 (aged 31)
Matteo Pelucchi (ITA)	21 January 1989 (aged 31)
Robert Power (AUS)	11 May 1995 (aged 25)
Domenico Pozzovivo (ITA)	30 November 1982 (aged 38)
Mauro Schmid (SUI)	4 December 1999 (aged 21)
Andreas Stokbro (DEN)	8 April 1997 (aged 23)
Dylan Sunderland (AUS)	26 February 1996 (aged 24)
Harry Tanfield (GBR)	17 November 1994 (aged 26)
Karel Vacek (CZE)	9 September 2000 (aged 20)
Emil Vinjebo (DEN)	24 March 1994 (aged 26)
Max Walscheid (GER)	13 June 1993 (aged 27)
Łukasz Wiśniowski (POL)	7 December 1991 (aged 29)

=== Trek–Segafredo ===
As of 10 June 2021.

Rider	Date of birth
Julien Bernard (FRA)	17 March 1992 (aged 28)
Gianluca Brambilla (ITA)	22 August 1987 (aged 33)
Giulio Ciccone (ITA)	20 December 1994 (aged 26)
Nicola Conci (ITA)	5 January 1997 (aged 23)
Koen de Kort (NED)	8 September 1982 (aged 38)
Niklas Eg (DEN)	6 January 1995 (aged 25)
Jakob Egholm (DEN)	27 April 1998 (aged 22)
Kenny Elissonde (FRA)	21 July 1991 (aged 29)
Amanuel Ghebreigzabhier (ERI)	17 August 1994 (aged 26)
Alexander Kamp (DEN)	14 December 1993 (aged 27)
Alex Kirsch (LUX)	12 June 1992 (aged 28)
Emīls Liepiņš (LAT)	29 October 1992 (aged 28)
Juan Pedro López (ESP)	31 July 1997 (aged 23)
Bauke Mollema (NED)	26 November 1986 (aged 34)
Jacopo Mosca (ITA)	29 August 1993 (aged 27)

Rider	Date of birth
Matteo Moschetti (ITA)	14 August 1996 (aged 24)
Ryan Mullen (IRE)	7 August 1994 (aged 26)
Antonio Nibali (ITA)	23 September 1992 (aged 28)
Vincenzo Nibali (ITA)	14 November 1984 (aged 36)
Mads Pedersen (DEN)	18 December 1995 (aged 25)
Charlie Quarterman (GBR)	6 September 1998 (aged 22)
Kiel Reijnen (USA)	1 June 1986 (aged 34)
Michel Ries (LUX)	11 March 1998 (aged 22)
Quinn Simmons (USA)	8 May 2001 (aged 19)
Mattias Skjelmose Jensen (DEN)	26 September 2000 (aged 20)
Toms Skujiņš (LAT)	15 June 1991 (aged 29)
Jasper Stuyven (BEL)	17 April 1992 (aged 28)
Edward Theuns (BEL)	30 April 1991 (aged 29)
Antonio Tiberi (ITA)	24 June 2001 (aged 19)

=== UAE Team Emirates ===
As of 10 June 2021.

Rider	Date of birth
Andrés Ardila (COL)	2 June 1999 (aged 21)
Juan Ayuso (Note: Ayuso spent the first half of the year with Team Colpack–Ballan before joining the team on 1 July.) (ESP)	16 September 2002 (aged 18)
Mikkel Bjerg (DEN)	3 November 1998 (aged 22)
Sven Erik Bystrøm (NOR)	21 January 1992 (aged 28)
Valerio Conti (ITA)	30 March 1993 (aged 27)
Alessandro Covi (ITA)	28 September 1998 (aged 22)
Rui Costa (POR)	5 October 1986 (aged 34)
David de la Cruz (ESP)	6 May 1989 (aged 31)
Joe Dombrowski (USA)	12 May 1991 (aged 29)
Finn Fisher-Black (Note: Fisher-Black joined from the Jumbo–Visma Development Team on 21 July 2021.) (NZL)	21 December 2001 (aged 19)
Davide Formolo (ITA)	25 September 1992 (aged 28)
Fernando Gaviria (COL)	19 August 1994 (aged 26)
Ryan Gibbons (RSA)	13 August 1994 (aged 26)
Marc Hirschi (SUI)	24 August 1998 (aged 22)
Alexander Kristoff (NOR)	5 July 1987 (aged 33)
Vegard Stake Laengen (NOR)	7 February 1989 (aged 31)

Rider	Date of birth
Rafał Majka (POL)	12 September 1989 (aged 31)
Marco Marcato (ITA)	11 February 1984 (aged 36)
Brandon McNulty (USA)	2 April 1998 (aged 22)
Yousif Mirza (UAE)	8 October 1988 (aged 32)
Juan Sebastián Molano (COL)	4 November 1994 (aged 26)
Cristian Camilo Muñoz (COL)	20 March 1996 (aged 24)
Ivo Oliveira (POR)	5 September 1996 (aged 24)
Rui Oliveira (POR)	5 September 1996 (aged 24)
Tadej Pogačar (SLO)	21 September 1998 (aged 22)
Jan Polanc (SLO)	6 May 1992 (aged 28)
Alexandr Riabushenko (BLR)	12 October 1995 (aged 25)
Maximiliano Richeze (ARG)	7 March 1983 (aged 37)
Matteo Trentin (ITA)	2 August 1989 (aged 31)
Oliviero Troia (ITA)	1 September 1994 (aged 26)
Diego Ulissi (ITA)	15 July 1989 (aged 31)

== See also ==
- 2021 in men's road cycling
- List of 2021 UCI ProTeams and Continental teams
- List of 2021 UCI Women's Teams and riders

Preceded by 2020	List of UCI WorldTeams; 2021	Succeeded by 2022
