= 2022 AG2R Citroën Team season =

Cycling team season

AG2R Citroën Team
- 2022 season
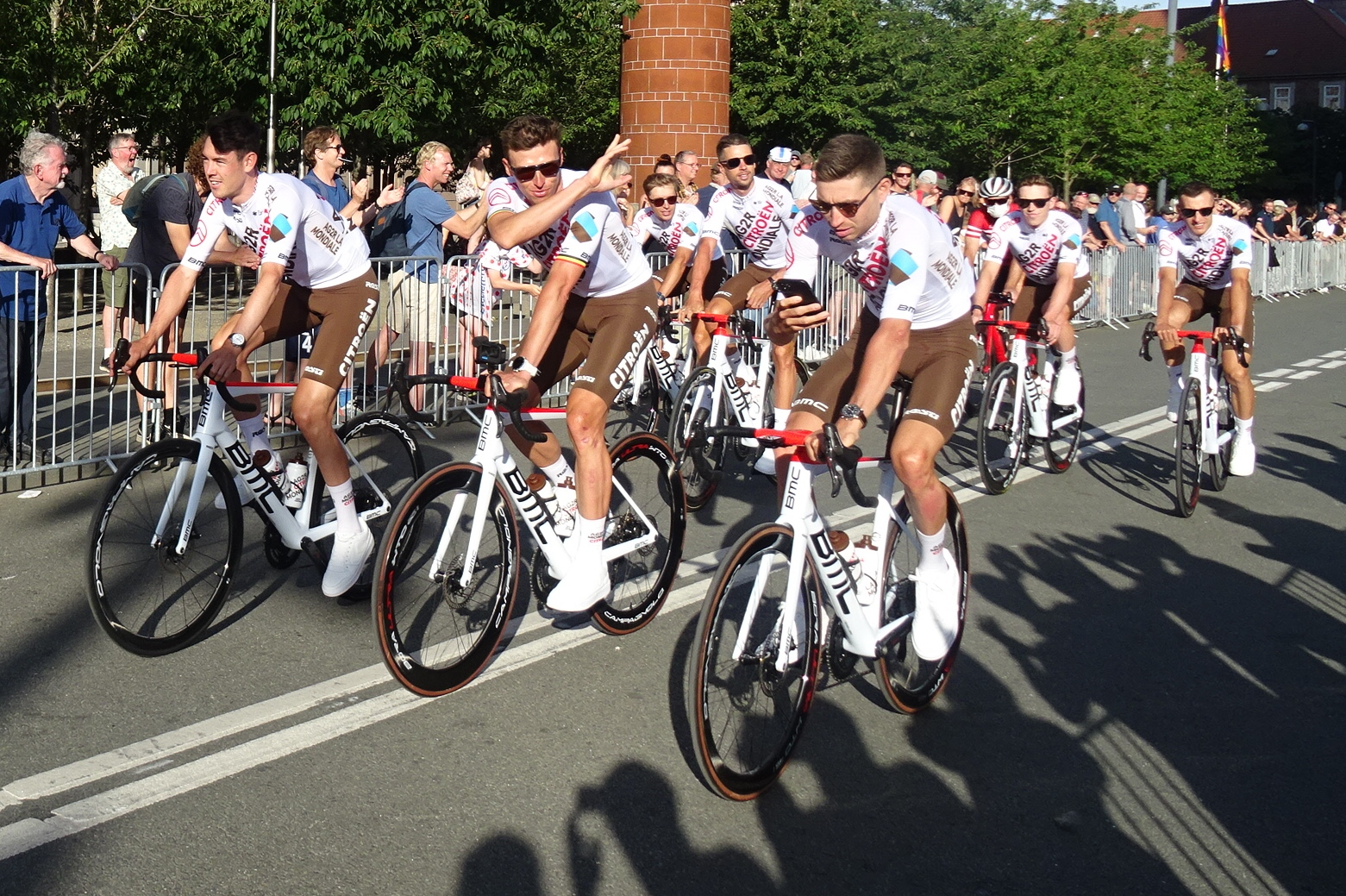
- AG2R Citroën at Tour de France team presentation
- UCI code: ACT
- Status: UCI WorldTeam
- Manager: Vincent Lavenu (FRA)
- Main sponsor(s): AG2R La Mondiale; Citroën
- Based: France
- Bicycles: BMC
- Groupset: Campagnolo

Season victories
- One-day races: 2
- Stage race stages: 2
- Jersey

The 2022 season for the AG2R Citroën Team is the 31st season in the team's existence and the 17th consecutive season as a UCI WorldTeam. French automobile manufacturer Citroën continues as a title sponsor for the second consecutive season alongside longtime title sponsor and French insurance firm AG2R La Mondiale. They use BMC bicycles, Campagnolo drivetrain, Campagnolo wheels and Rosti clothing.

== Team roster ==
As of 5 January 2022.

Rider	Date of birth
Clément Berthet (FRA)	2 August 1997 (aged 24)
Geoffrey Bouchard (FRA)	1 April 1992 (aged 29)
Lilian Calmejane (FRA)	6 December 1992 (aged 29)
Clément Champoussin (FRA)	29 May 1998 (aged 23)
Mikaël Cherel (FRA)	17 March 1986 (aged 35)
Benoît Cosnefroy (FRA)	17 October 1995 (aged 26)
Stan Dewulf (BEL)	20 December 1997 (aged 24)
Felix Gall (AUT)	27 February 1998 (aged 23)
Dorian Godon (FRA)	25 May 1996 (aged 25)
Jaakko Hänninen (FIN)	16 April 1997 (aged 24)
Anthony Jullien (FRA)	5 March 1998 (aged 23)
Bob Jungels (LUX)	22 September 1992 (aged 29)
Paul Lapeira (FRA)	25 February 2000 (aged 21)
Lawrence Naesen (BEL)	28 August 1992 (aged 29)
Oliver Naesen (BEL)	16 September 1990 (aged 31)

Rider	Date of birth
Ben O'Connor (AUS)	25 November 1995 (aged 26)
Aurélien Paret-Peintre (FRA)	27 February 1996 (aged 25)
Valentin Paret-Peintre (FRA)	14 January 2001 (aged 20)
Nans Peters (FRA)	12 March 1994 (aged 27)
Nicolas Prodhomme (FRA)	1 February 1997 (aged 24)
Antoine Raugel (FRA)	14 February 1999 (aged 22)
Marc Sarreau (FRA)	10 June 1993 (aged 28)
Michael Schär (SUI)	29 September 1986 (aged 35)
Damien Touzé (FRA)	7 July 1996 (aged 25)
Greg Van Avermaet (BEL)	17 May 1985 (aged 36)
Gijs Van Hoecke (BEL)	12 November 1991 (aged 30)
Andrea Vendrame (ITA)	20 July 1994 (aged 27)
Clément Venturini (FRA)	16 October 1993 (aged 28)
Larry Warbasse (USA)	28 January 1990 (aged 31)

Riders who joined the team for the 2022 season

Rider	2021 team
Felix Gall	Team DSM
Paul Lapeira	neo-pro (AG2R Citroën Team U23 Team)
Valentin Paret-Peintre	neo-pro (AG2R Citroën Team U23 Team)
Antoine Raugel	neo-pro (Équipe Continentale Groupama–FDJ)

Riders who left the team during or after the 2021 season

Rider	2022 team
François Bidard	Cofidis
Julien Duval	Retired
Mathias Frank	Retired
Tony Gallopin	Trek–Segafredo
Ben Gastauer	Retired
Alexis Gougeard	B&B Hotels–KTM

== Season victories ==
Date	Race	Competition	Rider	Country	Location	Ref.
20 March	Cholet-Pays de la Loire	UCI Europe Tour	Marc Sarreau (FRA)	France	Cholet	
23 March	Volta a Catalunya, Stage 3	UCI World Tour	Ben O'Connor (AUS)	Spain	La Molina	
16 April	Tour du Jura	UCI Europe Tour	Ben O'Connor (AUS)	France	Nozeroy	
18 April	Tour of the Alps, Stage 1	UCI ProSeries	Geoffrey Bouchard (FRA)	Italy	Primiero San Martino di Castrozza	

== National, Continental, and World Champions ==
Date	Discipline	Jersey	Rider	Country	Location	Ref.
