= 2021 EF Education–Nippo season =

EF Education–Nippo
- 2021 season
- UCI code: EFN
- Status: UCI WorldTeam
- World Tour Rank: 16th
- Manager: Jonathan Vaughters (USA)
- Main sponsor(s): EF Education First; Nippo Corporation
- Based: Boulder, Colorado, United States
- Bicycles: Cannondale
- Groupset: Shimano

Season victories
- One-day races: 3
- Stage race stages: 12
- National Championships: 1
- Most wins: Magnus Cort (DEN) (6)
- Best ranked rider: Neilson Powless (USA) (52nd)
- Jersey

The 2021 season for the EF Education–Nippo team was its thirteen season as a UCI WorldTeam and its nineteenth overall. For this season, Japanese construction company Nippo Corporation, which had sponsored French UCI ProTeam Nippo–Delko–One Provence last season, joined the team as a co-title sponsor, as did several of the French team's riders.

== Team roster ==
As of June 15, 2021.

Rider	Date of birth
Daniel Arroyave (COL)	June 19, 2000 (aged 20)
Will Barta (USA)	January 4, 1996 (aged 24)
Fumiyuki Beppu (JPN)	April 10, 1983 (aged 37)
Alberto Bettiol (ITA)	October 29, 1993 (aged 27)
Stefan Bissegger (SUI)	September 13, 1998 (aged 22)
Jonathan Caicedo (ECU)	April 28, 1993 (aged 27)
Diego Camargo (COL)	May 3, 1998 (aged 22)
Simon Carr (GBR)	August 29, 1998 (aged 22)
Hugh Carthy (GBR)	July 9, 1994 (aged 26)
Magnus Cort (DEN)	January 16, 1993 (aged 27)
Lawson Craddock (USA)	February 20, 1992 (aged 28)
Mitchell Docker (AUS)	October 2, 1986 (aged 34)
Julien El Fares (FRA)	June 1, 1985 (aged 35)
Ruben Guerreiro (POR)	July 6, 1994 (aged 26)
Sergio Higuita (COL)	August 1, 1997 (aged 23)

Rider	Date of birth
Moreno Hofland (NED)	August 31, 1991 (aged 29)
Alex Howes (USA)	January 1, 1988 (aged 33)
Jens Keukeleire (BEL)	November 23, 1988 (aged 32)
Sebastian Langeveld (NED)	January 17, 1985 (aged 35)
Lachlan Morton (AUS)	January 2, 1992 (aged 28)
Hideto Nakane (JPN)	May 2, 1990 (aged 30)
Logan Owen (USA)	March 23, 1995 (aged 25)
Neilson Powless (USA)	September 3, 1996 (aged 24)
Jonas Rutsch (GER)	January 24, 1998 (aged 22)
Tom Scully (NZL)	January 14, 1990 (aged 30)
Rigoberto Urán (COL)	January 26, 1987 (aged 33)
Michael Valgren (DEN)	February 7, 1992 (aged 28)
Julius van den Berg (NED)	October 23, 1996 (aged 24)
Tejay van Garderen (Note: Tejay van Garderen retired after the United States National Road Race Championships on June 20.) (USA)	August 12, 1988 (aged 32)
James Whelan (AUS)	July 11, 1996 (aged 24)

Riders who joined the team for the 2021 season

Rider	2020 team
Daniel Arroyave	neo-pro (UAE Team Colombia)
Will Barta	CCC Team
Fumiyuki Beppu	Nippo–Delko–One Provence
Diego Camargo	neo-pro (Colombia Tierra de Atletas–GW Bicicletas)
Simon Carr	Nippo–Delko–One Provence
Julien El Fares	Nippo–Delko–One Provence
Hideto Nakane	Nippo–Delko–One Provence
Michael Valgren	NTT Pro Cycling

Riders who left the team during or after the 2020 season

Rider	2021 team
Sean Bennett	Team Qhubeka Assos
Simon Clarke	Team Qhubeka Assos
Kristoffer Halvorsen	Uno-X Pro Cycling Team
Tanel Kangert	Team BikeExchange
Daniel Martínez	INEOS Grenadiers
Sep Vanmarcke	Israel Start-Up Nation
Luis Villalobos	Suspended
Michael Woods	Israel Start-Up Nation

== Season victories ==
Date	Race	Competition	Rider	Country	Location	Ref.
March 9	Paris–Nice, Stage 3 (ITT)	UCI World Tour	Stefan Bissegger (SUI)	France	Gien	
March 14	Paris–Nice, Stage 8	UCI World Tour	Magnus Cort (DEN)	France	Levens	
May 27	Giro d'Italia, Stage 18	UCI World Tour	Alberto Bettiol (ITA)	Italy	Stradella	
June 9	Tour de Suisse, Stage 4	UCI World Tour	Stefan Bissegger (SUI)	Switzerland	Gstaad	
June 12	Tour de Suisse, Stage 7 (ITT)	UCI World Tour	Rigoberto Urán (COL)	Switzerland	Andermatt	
June 13	Tour de Suisse, Points classification	UCI World Tour	Stefan Bissegger (SUI)	Switzerland		
June 13	Route d'Occitanie, Stage 4	UCI Europe Tour	Magnus Cort (DEN)	France	Duilhac-sous-Peyrepertuse	
June 13	Route d'Occitanie, Young rider classification	UCI Europe Tour	Simon Carr (GBR)	France		
July 31	Clásica de San Sebastián	UCI World Tour	Neilson Powless (USA)	Spain	San Sebastián	
August 7	Vuelta a Burgos, Stage 5	UCI Europe Tour; UCI ProSeries	Hugh Carthy (GBR)	Spain	Lagunas de Neila	
August 15	Tour de Pologne, Stage 7	UCI World Tour	Julius van den Berg (NED)	Poland	Kraków	
August 19	Vuelta a España, Stage 6	UCI World Tour	Magnus Cort (DEN)	Spain	Alto de Cullera	
August 26	Vuelta a España, Stage 12	UCI World Tour	Magnus Cort (DEN)	Spain	Córdoba	
August 31	Benelux Tour, Stage 2 (ITT)	UCI World Tour	Stefan Bissegger (SUI)	Netherlands	Lelystad	
September 3	Vuelta a España, Stage 19	UCI World Tour	Magnus Cort (DEN)	Spain	Monforte de Lemos	
September 5	Vuelta a España, Super-combativity award	UCI World Tour	Magnus Cort (DEN)	Spain		
September 15	Giro della Toscana	UCI Europe Tour	Michael Valgren (DEN)	Italy	Pontedera	
September 16	Coppa Sabatini	UCI Europe Tour; UCI ProSeries	Michael Valgren (DEN)	Italy	Peccioli	

== National, Continental, and World Champions ==
Date	Discipline	Jersey	Rider	Country	Location	Ref.
June 17	United States National Time Trial Championships		Lawson Craddock (USA)	United States	Knoxville	
