= Antoine Raugel =

French bicycle racer

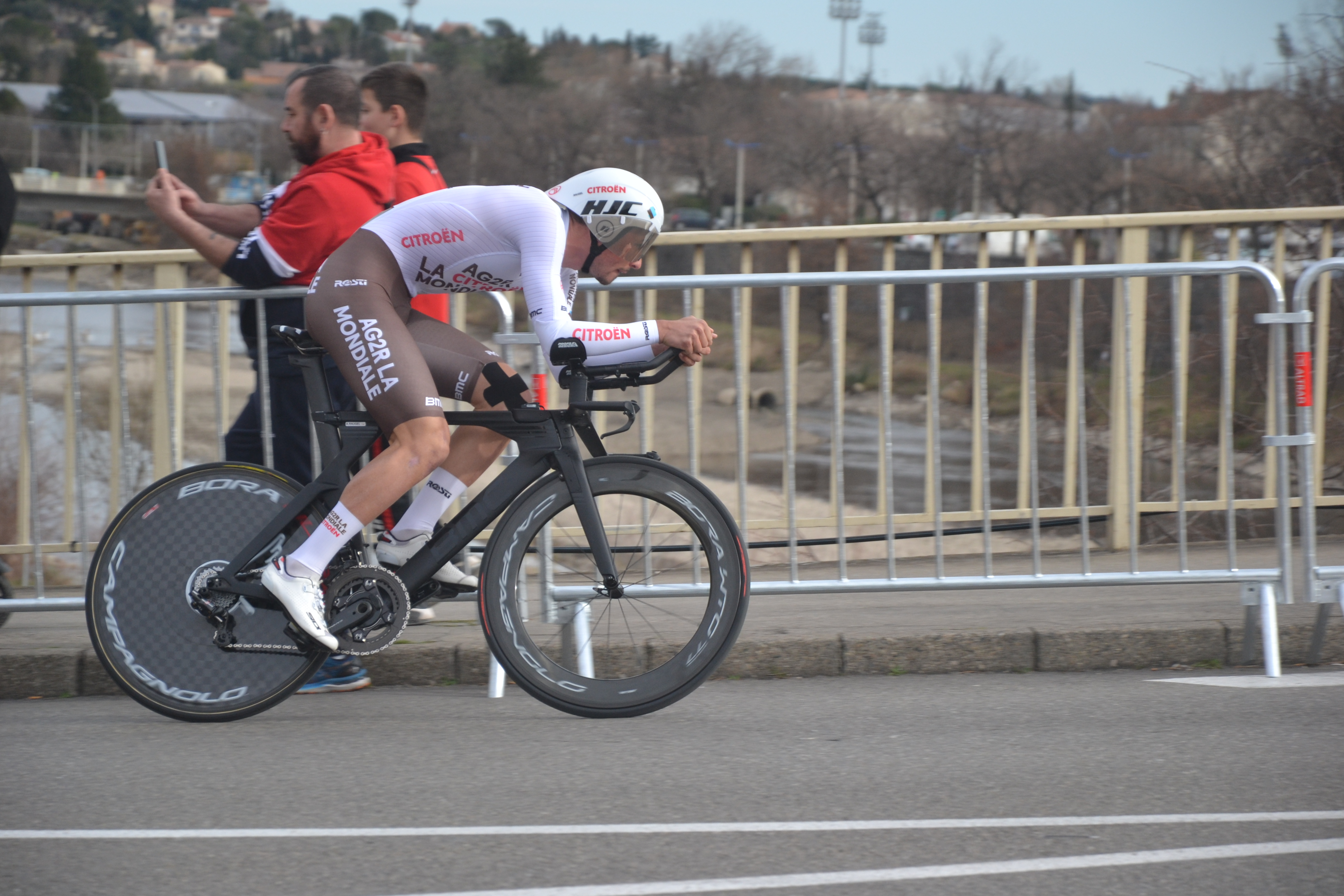

Personal information
- Born: 14 February 1999 (age 27) Strasbourg, France
- Height: 1.85 m (6 ft 1 in)
- Weight: 70 kg (154 lb)

Cycling career
- Sport: Cycling
- Current team: VC Villefranche Beaujolais
- Discipline: Road
- Role: Rider

Amateur teams
- 2007–2017: VC Eckwersheim
- 2018–2020: Chambéry CF
- 2024–: VC Villefranche Beaujolais

Professional teams
- 2020: AG2R La Mondiale (stagiaire)
- 2021: Équipe Continentale Groupama–FDJ
- 2022–2023: AG2R Citroën Team

Antoine Raugel (born 14 February 1999) is a French cyclist, who currently rides for French amateur team VC Villefranche Beaujolais. He previously spent two seasons with UCI WorldTeam Decathlon CMA CGM Team.

== Major results ==
2017
National Junior Road Championships

1st Road race
2nd Time trial

1st Points classification, SPIE Internationale Juniorendriedaagse
2nd Chrono des Nations Juniors
4th Overall Sint-Martinusprijs Kontich
10th La Classique des Alpes Juniors
10th Grand Prix Bob Jungels
2018
10th Paris–Roubaix Espoirs
10th Trofeo Edil C
2019
9th Trofeo Città di San Vendemiano
2021
3rd Paris–Troyes
5th Giro del Belvedere

=== Grand Tour general classification results timeline ===
Grand Tour	2022
Giro d'Italia	—
Tour de France	—
Vuelta a España	115

Legend
—	Did not compete
DNF	Did not finish
