= André Carvalho (cyclist) =

Portuguese cyclist

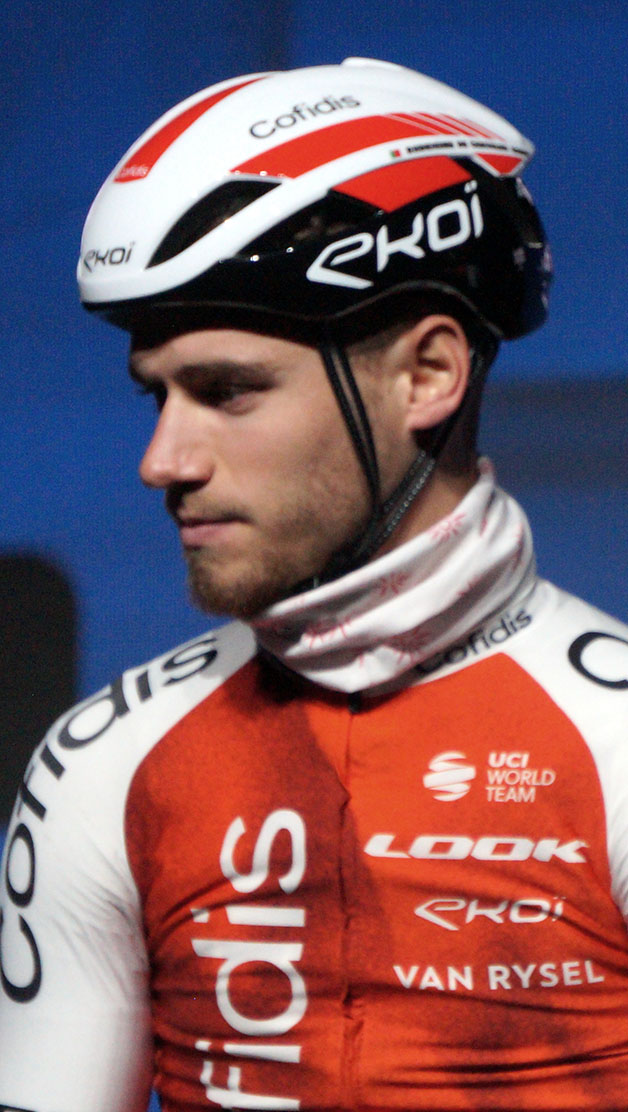
- Carvalho in 2023

Personal information
- Born: 31 October 1997 (age 28) Vila Nova de Famalicão, Portugal
- Height: 1.81 m (5 ft 11 in)
- Weight: 66.5 kg (147 lb)

Cycling career
- Sport: Cycling
- Current team: Anicolor / Campicarn
- Discipline: Road
- Role: Rider

Professional teams
- 2018: Liberty Seguros–Carglass
- 2019–2020: Hagens Berman Axeon
- 2021–2023: Cofidis
- 2024–: Sabgal–Anicolor

André Carvalho (born 31 October 1997) is a Portuguese professional racing cyclist, who currently rides for UCI Continental Anicolor / Campicarn.

== Major results ==
2014
1st Road race, National Junior Road Championships
2015
1st Road race, National Junior Road Championships
2017
National Under–23 Road Championships

2nd Road race
8th Time trial

2018
3rd Road race, National Under–23 Road Championships
2019
4th Road race, National Under–23 Road Championships
5th Liège–Bastogne–Liège U23
5th Paris–Roubaix Espoirs
9th Grote Prijs Jef Scherens
2020
10th Grand Prix d'Isbergues

=== Grand Tour general classification results timeline ===
Grand Tour	2023
Giro d'Italia	—
Tour de France	—
Vuelta a España	134

Legend
—	Did not compete
DNF	Did not finish
