= Jonas Rutsch =

German cyclist (born 1998)

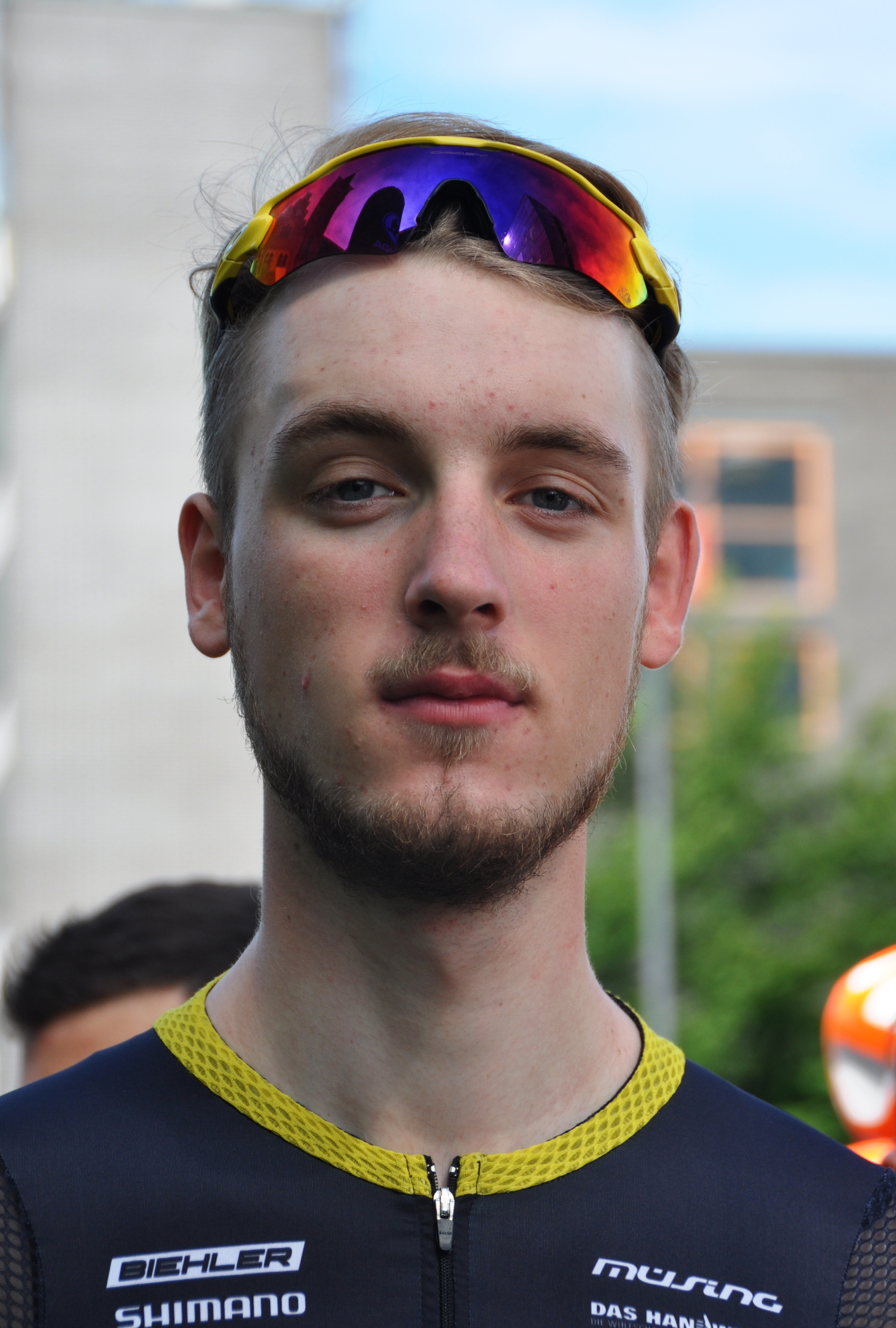
- Rutsch in 2017

Personal information
- Born: 24 January 1998 (age 28) Erbach im Odenwald, Hesse, Germany
- Height: 1.97 m (6 ft 6 in)
- Weight: 82 kg (181 lb)

Cycling career
- Sport: Cycling
- Current team: Lotto–Intermarché
- Discipline: Road
- Role: Rider
- Rider type: Classics specialist

Professional teams
- 2017–2019: Team Lotto–Kern Haus
- 2020–2024: EF Pro Cycling
- 2025: Intermarché–Wanty
- 2026–: Lotto–Intermarché

Jonas Rutsch (born 24 January 1998) is a German professional road racing cyclist, who currently rides for UCI WorldTeam Lotto–Intermarché.

== Career ==
He rode for Team Lotto–Kern Haus in the men's team time trial event at the 2018 UCI Road World Championships. Two years later, he stepped up to join EF Pro Cycling. Considered a strong classics rider, he won the Kattekoers, the under-23 version of Gent–Wevelgem in 2019 and finished 11th at the 2021 Paris–Roubaix.

== Major results ==
2018
2nd Road race, National Under-23 Road Championships
2nd Eschborn–Frankfurt Under–23
10th Overall Boucles de la Mayenne
2019
1st Kattekoers
6th Overall International Tour of Rhodes

1st Young rider classification

6th Overall Tour Alsace
8th Overall Tour de Luxembourg
8th Rund um Köln
2022
National Road Championships

4th Time trial
5th Road race

2023
5th Road race, National Road Championships
2024
9th Cadel Evans Great Ocean Road Race
2025
6th Paris–Roubaix
2026
3rd Philadelphia Cycling Classic

=== Grand Tour general classification results timeline ===
Grand Tour	2021	2022	2023	2024	2025	2026
Giro d'Italia	—	—	—	—	—	106
Tour de France	55	94	—	—	128	—
Vuelta a España	—	—	—	—	—	—

Legend
—	Did not compete
DNF	Did not finish
