= Daniel Arroyave =

Colombian cyclist (born 2000)

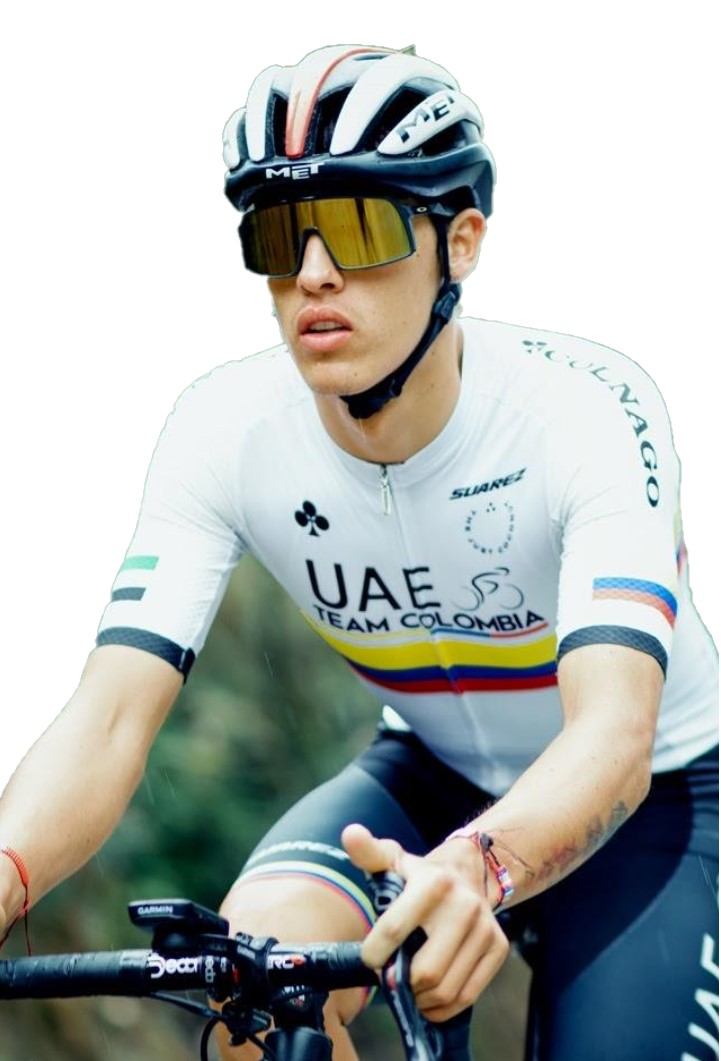

Personal information
- Full name: Daniel Arroyave
- Born: 19 June 2000 (age 26) Yarumal, Colombia
- Height: 1.78 m (5 ft 10 in)
- Weight: 52 kg (115 lb)

Cycling career
- Sport: Cycling
- Current team: GW Erco SportFitness
- Discipline: Road
- Role: Rider

Amateur teams
- 2020: UAE Team Colombia
- 2023: Orgullo Paisa

Professional teams
- 2019: Orgullo Paisa
- 2019: Team Novak
- 2021–2022: EF Education–Nippo
- 2024–: GW Erco Shimano

Daniel Arroyave Cañas (born 19 June 2000 in Yarumal) is a Colombian professional road racing cyclist, who currently rides for UCI Continental team GW Erco SportFitness.

== Major results ==
2018
1st Overall Vuelta a Colombia Juniors

1st Stage 4

2020
1st Road race, National Under–23 Road Championships
1st Stage 2 Clásica Rionegro
