= Anthony Jullien =

French bicycle racer

Personal information
- Born: 5 March 1998 (age 28) Givors, France
- Height: 1.78 m (5 ft 10 in)
- Weight: 72 kg (159 lb)

Cycling career
- Sport: Cycling
- Current team: Retired
- Discipline: Road
- Role: Rider

Amateur teams
- 2016: UCA Pélussin
- 2017–2020: Chambéry CF

Professional teams
- 2019: AG2R La Mondiale (stagiaire)
- 2020: AG2R La Mondiale (stagiaire)
- 2021–2022: AG2R Citroën Team

Anthony Jullien (born 5 March 1998) is a French former cyclist, who competed as a professional for UCI WorldTeam AG2R Citroën Team for the 2021 and 2022 seasons.

== Major results ==
2018
5th Paris–Tours Espoirs
2019
2nd Road race, National Under-23 Road Championships
2nd Trofeo Gianfranco Bianchin
4th Ruota d'Oro
5th Grand Prix des Marbriers
9th Paris–Tours Espoirs
2020
5th Paris–Tours Espoirs
